= 1979–80 Major Indoor Soccer League season =

Major Indoor Soccer League
- Season: 1979–80
- Champions: New York Arrows (2nd title)
- Matches: 160
- Goals: 1,897 (11.86 per match)
- Top goalscorer: (Socialist Federal Republic of Yugoslavia) Steve Zungul (90 goals)
- Average attendance: 6,009

The 1979–80 Major Indoor Soccer League season was the second in league history and would end with the New York Arrows repeating as MISL champions.

== Recap ==
Expansion would increase league membership to 10 teams. There would be a split into two divisions (the Atlantic and Central). The new teams were placed in Buffalo, Hartford, Wichita, Detroit and St. Louis. All but Hartford had a measure of success, as three of the new clubs would make the playoffs and St. Louis averaged over 14,000 fans despite finishing tied for the MISL's worst record.

To accommodate the expanded league, the playoff format was tweaked to include the top three teams in each division. The first round would be a single game between the second and third-place finishers, while the semifinals were a two-game series between the first-place finisher and the first round winner. If the teams were tied at one win apiece, there would be a 15-minute minigame to decide the winner. If the teams remained tied, there would be a MISL-style penalty shootout to break the tie. The winner of the Atlantic Division final would host the championship game.

The Pittsburgh Spirit would recover from a 5–10 start and a coaching change to finish second in the Atlantic, thanks to a league-record 13-game winning streak. They would be joined in the playoffs by the Buffalo Stallions, who snuck into the postseason thanks to the Philadelphia Fever's loss in the season finale. The Stallions qualified due to their 3–1 head-to-head record against the Fever.

In the end, the New York Arrows repeated as champions, thanks to the goalscoring exploits of Steve Zungul. Zungul scored a combined 100 goals (90 in the regular season, 10 in the playoffs) to lead the Arrows, winning both the regular season and playoff MVP awards in the process.

After the season, the Spirit suspended operations for one year. Pittsburgh would return for the 1981–82 season, however.

== Teams ==
Team	City/Area	Arena
Buffalo Stallions	Buffalo, New York	Buffalo Memorial Auditorium
Cleveland Force	Cleveland, Ohio	Richfield Coliseum
Detroit Lightning	Detroit, Michigan	Cobo Arena
Hartford Hellions	Hartford, Connecticut	New Haven Coliseum; Hartford Civic Center
Houston Summit	Houston, Texas	The Summit
New York Arrows	Uniondale, New York	Nassau Veterans Memorial Coliseum
Philadelphia Fever	Philadelphia	The Spectrum
Pittsburgh Spirit	Pittsburgh, Pennsylvania	Civic Arena (Pittsburgh)
St. Louis Steamers	St. Louis, Missouri	St. Louis Arena
Wichita Wings	Wichita, Kansas	Kansas Coliseum

== Map of clubs ==
Atlantic Division Central Division

== Regular season ==
=== Schedule ===
The 1979–80 regular season schedule ran from November 24, 1979, to March 9, 1980. The 32 games per team was an increase of eight over the 1978–79 schedule of 24 games.

=== Final standings ===
Playoff teams in bold.

Atlantic Division	W	L	Pct.	GB	GF	GA	Home	Road
**New York Arrows**	27	5	.844	--	296	175	16–0	11–5
**Pittsburgh Spirit**	18	14	.563	9	188	191	11–5	7–9
**Buffalo Stallions**	17	15	.531	10	172	197	10–6	7–9
Philadelphia Fever	17	15	.531	10	201	197	9–7	8–8
Hartford Hellions	6	26	.188	21	151	240	4–12	2–14

Central Division	W	L	Pct.	GB	GF	GA	Home	Road
**Houston Summit**	20	12	.625	--	181	160	14–2	6–10
**Wichita Wings**	16	16	.500	4	187	173	10–6	6–10
**Detroit Lightning**	15	17	.469	5	192	201	8–8	7–9
St. Louis Steamers	12	20	.375	8	177	184	8–8	4–12
Cleveland Force	12	20	.375	8	152	179	8–8	4–12

=== Team attendance ===
Club	Games	Total	Average
St. Louis Steamers	16	224,959	14,060
Buffalo Stallions	16	136,892	8,556
New York Arrows	16	125,008	7,813
Philadelphia Fever	16	105,881	6,618
Hartford Hellions	16	86,203	5,388
Pittsburgh Spirit	16	81,781	5,111
Wichita Wings	16	61,618	3,851
Detroit Lightning	16	56,325	3,520
Cleveland Force	16	49,320	3,280
Houston Summit	16	33,496	2,094
**OVERALL**	**160**	**961,443**	**6,009**

=== Regular season statistics ===
==== Scoring leaders ====
GP = Games Played, G = Goals, A = Assists, Pts = Points

Player	Team	GP	G	A	Pts
(Socialist Federal Republic of Yugoslavia) Steve Zungul	New York Arrows	32	90	46	136
(United States) Fred Grgurev	Philadelphia Fever	31	64	40	104
(Finland) Kai Haaskivi	Houston Summit	27	51	36	87
(Canada) Branko Segota	New York Arrows	31	55	31	86
(Canada) Pat Ercoli	Detroit Lightning	32	44	24	68
(Socialist Federal Republic of Yugoslavia) Iubo Petrovic	Buffalo Stallions	31	46	21	67
(Scotland) Graham Fyfe	Pittsburgh Spirit	31	37	28	65
(United States) Juli Veee	New York Arrows	26	29	35	64
(Socialist Federal Republic of Yugoslavia) Damir Sutevski	New York Arrows	30	32	26	58
(Scotland) Jim Ryan	Wichita Wings	29	26	29	55

==== Goalkeeping leaders ====
Note: GP = Games played; Min – Minutes played; GA = Goals against; GAA = Goals against average; W = Wins; L = Losses

Player	Team	GP	Min	GA	GAA	W	L
(United States) Sepp Gantenhammer	Houston Summit	14	801	59	4.42	8	5
(United States) Alan Mayer	Pittsburgh Spirit	17	952	77	4.85	13	4
(United States) Cliff Brown	Cleveland Force	28	1130	95	5.04	8	10
(United States) Keith Van Eron	Wichita Wings	20	1050	89	5.09	10	8
(United States) Paul Turin	St. Louis Steamers	18	932	80	5.15	6	10
(United States) Shep Messing	New York Arrows	32	1754	151	5.17	15	5
(England) Mick Poole	Pittsburgh Spirit	20	1124	99	5.29	12	7
(United States) Eric Delabar	St. Louis Steamers	12	498	44	5.301	5	5
(United States) Mike Ivanow	Wichita Wings	14	792	70	5.303	6	6
(United States) Bob Rigby	Philadelphia Fever	12	684	65	5.70	8	4

== All-Star Game ==
The first MISL All-Star game was played at the Checkerdome in St. Louis, Missouri on February 27, 1980. Players were divided up by division. Rosters spots were determined by peer voting, with additional spots decided by the two coaches. A crowd of 16,892 watched the Central Division squad upset the Atlantic, 9–4. On the strength of three goals and one assist, Pat Ercoli of Detroit was named the game's MVP, with Mick Poole of Houston finishing second, and St. Louis' Steve Pecher third.

=== Central Division roster ===
Coach: (United States) Pat McBride, St. Louis

First Team	Position	Second Team	Coach's Additions
(England) Mick Poole, Houston	G	(Canada) Chris Turner, Detroit	–
(Scotland) Ian Anderson, Houston	D	* (England) Stewart Jump, Houston	(Canada) Carl Rose, St. Louis
(United States) Steve Pecher, St. Louis	D	(England) George Ley, Wichita	# (United States) Tony Bellinger, St. Louis
(Finland) Kai Haaskivi, Houston	F	(Canada) Pat Ercoli, Detroit	(Spain) Manny Cuenca, St. Louis
(Denmark) Flemming Lund, Detroit	F	(United States) John Stremlau, Houston	(United States) Johnny Moore, Detroit
(Scotland) Jim Ryan, Wichita	F	(England) Norman Piper, Wichita	* (Bermuda) Clyde Best, Cleveland # (United States) Poli Garcia

*injured, did not play • #replaced injured player

=== Atlantic Division roster ===
Coach: Don Popovic, New York

First Team	Position	Second Team	Coach's Additions
(United States) Jim May, Buffalo	G	(United States) Shep Messing, New York	–
(United States) David D'Errico, New York	D	(Hungary) László Harsányi, New York	(United States) Bobby Smith, Philadelphia
(United States) Doc Lawson, Philadelphia	D	(England) Clive Charles, Pittsburgh	(United States) Paul Toomey, Hartford
(Socialist Federal Republic of Yugoslavia) Steve Zungul, New York	F	(United States) Juli Veee, New York	(England) Steve Buttle, Pittsburgh
(Canada) Branko Šegota, New York	F	(Socialist Federal Republic of Yugoslavia) Steve Karasi, Buffalo	(Socialist Federal Republic of Yugoslavia) Damir Šutevski, New York
(United States) Fred Grgurev, Philadelphia	F	* (Socialist Federal Republic of Yugoslavia) Slobodan Jankovic, Buffalo	# (Socialist Federal Republic of Yugoslavia) Iubo Petrović, Buffalo

*injured, did not play • #replaced injured player

=== Match report ===
February 27, 1980 All-Star Game	Central Division All-Stars	9–4	Atlantic Division All-Stars	St. Louis, Missouri
7:30 PM (CST)	Ercoli (8:29); Ercoli (18:41); Ercoli (20:38); Piper (21:26); Cuenca (21:58); Pecher (47:47); Ryan (53:46); Haaskivi (56:31); Garcia (58:25)	Report	Lawson (24:31); Grgurev (25:02); Zungul (29:14); Veee (39:49)	Stadium: Checkerdome; Attendance: 16,892; Referee: Dr. Joe Machnik

Three Stars of the Match: 1. (Canada) Pat Ercoli, Detroit; 2. (England) Mick Poole, Houston; 3. (United States) Steve Pecher, St. Louis

== Playoffs ==
=== Bracket ===
Division Semifinals; Single match
A2	Pittsburgh Spirit	5
A3	Buffalo Stallions	3
C2	Wichita Wings	6
C3	Detroit Lightning	5

Single match Best-of-three
A1	New York Arrows	2
A2	Pittsburgh Spirit	0
C1	Houston Summit	2
C2	Wichita Wings	0

Championship Game; Single match
A1	New York Arrows	6
C2	Houston Summit	5

=== Division Semifinals ===
March 11	Wichita Wings	6–5	Detroit Lightning	Kansas Coliseum • 6,245

March 13	Pittsburgh Spirit	5–3	Buffalo Stallions	Civic Arena • 5,079

=== Division Finals ===
Higher seed		Lower seed	Game 1	Game 2	Mini-game
New York Arrows	–	Pittsburgh Spirit	6–3	11–3	x	March 16 • Civic Arena • 6,300; March 21 • Nassau Coliseum • 8,802
Houston Summit	–	Wichita Wings	5–4 (OT)	4–3	x	March 18 • Kansas Coliseum • 9,300; March 20 • The Summit • 2,641

=== Championship Game ===
March 23, 1980
7:35 PM (EST)
MISL Finals

New York Arrows	7–4	Houston Summit
Zungul (8:29); Šutevski (10:11); Cila (22:14); Zungul; Šegota; Zungul (56:09); Vee (57:27)	Report A Report B Report C	Anderson (7:39); Jump; Morielli; Russell (54:08)

Nassau Veterans Memorial Coliseum, Uniondale, New York
Attendance: 8,469
- Playoff MVP: Steve Zungul, New York Arrows (3 games, 10 goals)

=== Playoff statistics ===
==== Playoff scoring ====
GP = Games Played, G = Goals, A = Assists, Pts = Points

Player	Team	GP	G	A	Pts
(Socialist Federal Republic of Yugoslavia) Steve Zungul	New York Arrows	3	10	4	14
(United States) Juli Veee	New York Arrows	3	5	3	8
(England) Steve Buttle	Pittsburgh Spirit	3	6	2	8
(Argentina) Omar Gomez	Wichita Wings	3	4	2	6
(Finland) Kai Haaskivi	Houston Summit	3	4	1	5

==== Playoff goalkeeping ====
Note: GP = Games played; Min – Minutes played; GA = Goals against; GAA = Goals against average; W = Wins; L = Losses

Player	Team	GP	Min	GA	GAA	W	L
(England) Tony Betts	Buffalo Stallions	1	4	0	0.00	0	0
(United States) Shep Messing	New York Arrows	3	180	10	3.33	3	0
(Canada) Chris Turner	Detroit Lightning	1	48	3	3.75	0	0
(England) Mick Poole	Houston Summit	3	185	14	4.54	2	1
(United States) Keith Van Eron	Wichita Wings	3	185	14	4.54	1	2

== League awards ==
- Most Valuable Player: (Socialist Federal Republic of Yugoslavia) Steve Zungul, New York
- Scoring Champion: (Socialist Federal Republic of Yugoslavia) Steve Zungul, New York
- Pass Master: (Socialist Federal Republic of Yugoslavia) Steve Zungul, New York
- Rookie of the Year: (Canada) Jim Sinclair, Buffalo
- Goalkeeper of the Year: (United States) Sepp Gantenhammer, Houston
- Coach of the Year: (United States) Len Bilous, Pittsburgh and Pat McBride, St. Louis
- Championship Series Most Valuable Player: (Socialist Federal Republic of Yugoslavia) Steve Zungul, New York

=== All-MISL Teams ===
First Team	Position	Second Team
(United States) Shep Messing, New York	G	(United States) Alan Mayer, Pittsburgh
(Finland) Kai Haaskivi, Houston	D	(United States) Fred Grgurev, Philadelphia
(Canada) Branko Segota, New York	D	(England) Steve Buttle, Pittsburgh (United States) Juli Veee, New York
(Socialist Federal Republic of Yugoslavia) Steve Zungul, New York	M	(United States) Dave D'Errico, New York
(Scotland) Ian Anderson, Houston	F	(England) Clive Charles, Pittsburgh
(Denmark) Flemming Lund, Detroit	F	(United States) Steve Pecher, St. Louis

Honorable Mention	Position	
(England) Mick Poole, Houston	G	(Netherlands) Keith Van Eron, Wichita
		(United States) Jim May, Buffalo
(United States) Doc Lawson, Philadelphia	D	(United States) Jim Pollihan, Houston
(Argentina) Luis Alberto, New York	M	(England) Norman Piper, Wichita
		(Argentina) Ernie Buriano, Buffalo
(Canada) Pat Ercoli, Detroit	F	(Scotland) Jim Ryan, Wichita
