= 1980–81 Major Indoor Soccer League season =

Major Indoor Soccer League
- Season: 1980–81
- Champions: New York Arrows (3rd title)
- Matches: 240
- Goals: 2,524 (10.52 per match)
- Top goalscorer: (Socialist Federal Republic of Yugoslavia) Steve Zungul (108 goals)
- Average attendance: 6,839

The 1980–81 Major Indoor Soccer League season was the third in league history and would end with the New York Arrows repeating once again as MISL champions.

== Recap ==
There were plenty of changes as the league began its third year. The Houston Summit would move to Baltimore and the Detroit Lightning moved to San Francisco. Three new clubs were added – the Chicago Horizons, the Denver Avalanche and the Phoenix Inferno.

With 12 teams, the league moved to three divisions. To accommodate the three-division setup, the playoff format was tweaked once again. The top two teams in each division would qualify, along with the next best two teams for eight qualifiers in total. While the first round was a best of three series, Commissioner Earl Foreman announced in early November 1980 that there would be single-game semifinals and a final set to be played in St. Louis on the weekend of March 27, 1981.

As it turned out, St. Louis pulled off a worst-to-first turnaround in their division with the second-best record in the MISL and made the championship game. In their semifinal against Wichita, the Steamers rallied from a 6-1 third quarter deficit to tie the game and win in a shootout. Over 33,000 fans attended both nights at the St. Louis Arena.

New York's Steve Zungul won regular season MVP honors for the third time, and added the playoff MVP. Zungul scored four goals and an assist in both the semifinal win over Baltimore and the championship game. Zungul scored the game-winning goal with less than 30 seconds left against St. Louis, the last of his combined 123 goals (108 regular season and 15 playoff goals, respectively). The 108 goals would remain an MISL record through the end of the league in 1992.

After the season, Chicago folded. The league wanted to return to the market, but Chicago Sting owner Lee Stern paid to keep the Chicago market for himself and the Sting.

== Teams ==
Team	City/Area	Arena
Baltimore Blast	Baltimore, Maryland	Baltimore Arena
Buffalo Stallions	Buffalo, New York	Buffalo Memorial Auditorium
Chicago Horizons	Rosemont, Illinois	Rosemont Horizon
Cleveland Force	Cleveland, Ohio	Richfield Coliseum
Denver Avalanche	Denver, Colorado	McNichols Sports Arena
Hartford Hellions	Hartford, Connecticut	New Haven Coliseum; Hartford Civic Center
New York Arrows	Uniondale, New York	Nassau Veterans Memorial Coliseum
Philadelphia Fever	Philadelphia	The Spectrum
Phoenix Inferno	Phoenix, Arizona	Arizona Veterans Memorial Coliseum
San Francisco Fog	Daly City, California	Cow Palace
St. Louis Steamers	St. Louis, Missouri	St. Louis Arena
Wichita Wings	Wichita, Kansas	Kansas Coliseum

== Map of clubs ==
Atlantic Division Central Division Western Division

== Regular Season Schedule ==
The 1980–81 regular season schedule ran from November 7, 1980, to March 8, 1981. The 40 games per team was an increase of eight over the 1979–80 schedule of 32 games.

1980-81 Major Indoor Soccer League Regular Season Schedule

Day of Week	Date	Away team	Away Score	Home team	Home Score	OT
Friday	11/7/1980	Cleveland Force	6	Buffalo Stallions	10	
Saturday	11/8/1980	San Francisco Fog	2	Philadelphia Fever	8	
Saturday	11/8/1980	Cleveland Force	5	Hartford Hellions	4	
Sunday	11/9/1980	San Francisco Fog	8	Buffalo Stallions	7	
Friday	11/14/1980	Denver Avalanche	4	Buffalo Stallions	10	
Friday	11/14/1980	Baltimore Blast	3	Hartford Hellions	4	
Saturday	11/15/1980	Denver Avalanche	3	Cleveland Force	7	
Sunday	11/16/1980	Philadelphia Fever	6	Hartford Hellions	7	OT
Sunday	11/16/1980	Wichita Wings	2	New York Arrows	7	
Tuesday	11/18/1980	New York Arrows	10	Philadelphia Fever	3	
Wednesday	11/19/1980	Buffalo Stallions	4	Hartford Hellions	5	
Wednesday	11/19/1980	San Francisco Fog	3	Denver Avalanche	4	
Thursday	11/20/1980	Baltimore Blast	3	St. Louis Steamers	6	
Friday	11/21/1980	New York Arrows	8	Chicago Horizons	7	OT
Friday	11/21/1980	San Francisco Fog	6	Phoenix Inferno	5	OT
Saturday	11/22/1980	Chicago Horizons	4	Wichita Wings	5	
Saturday	11/22/1980	St. Louis Steamers	7	Denver Avalanche	5	
Saturday	11/22/1980	Phoenix Inferno	3	San Francisco Fog	5	
Sunday	11/23/1980	Hartford Hellions	1	New York Arrows	2	
Wednesday	11/26/1980	Baltimore Blast	5	New York Arrows	3	
Wednesday	11/26/1980	San Francisco Fog	1	Chicago Horizons	9	
Friday	11/28/1980	St. Louis Steamers	4	Philadelphia Fever	2	
Friday	11/28/1980	San Francisco Fog	5	Buffalo Stallions	11	
Friday	11/28/1980	Baltimore Blast	3	Chicago Horizons	5	
Friday	11/28/1980	Denver Avalanche	5	Wichita Wings	10	
Saturday	11/29/1980	Philadelphia Fever	7	Baltimore Blast	10	
Saturday	11/29/1980	New York Arrows	6	Cleveland Force	4	
Saturday	11/29/1980	Wichita Wings	4	Phoenix Inferno	5	
Sunday	11/30/1980	Buffalo Stallions	7	New York Arrows	10	
Sunday	11/30/1980	Denver Avalanche	4	Chicago Horizons	10	
Sunday	11/30/1980	Cleveland Force	7	St. Louis Steamers	8	
Monday	12/1/1980	Buffalo Stallions	4	Philadelphia Fever	7	
Tuesday	12/2/1980	New York Arrows	4	Wichita Wings	5	
Wednesday	12/3/1980	Buffalo Stallions	4	Baltimore Blast	5	OT
Wednesday	12/3/1980	St. Louis Steamers	2	Chicago Horizons	7	
Wednesday	12/3/1980	Hartford Hellions	3	Denver Avalanche	4	OT
Wednesday	12/3/1980	Cleveland Force	6	Phoenix Inferno	3	
Wednesday	12/3/1980	New York Arrows	10	San Francisco Fog	4	
Thursday	12/4/1980	Chicago Horizons	6	Phoenix Inferno	4	
Friday	12/5/1980	Philadelphia Fever	3	Wichita Wings	4	
Friday	12/5/1980	St. Louis Steamers	5	Buffalo Stallions	4	
Friday	12/5/1980	Denver Avalanche	4	San Francisco Fog	6	
Saturday	12/6/1980	Philadelphia Fever	5	Denver Avalanche	3	
Saturday	12/6/1980	Cleveland Force	5	Baltimore Blast	6	
Saturday	12/6/1980	St. Louis Steamers	3	Hartford Hellions	2	
Saturday	12/6/1980	New York Arrows	9	Phoenix Inferno	5	
Sunday	12/7/1980	Buffalo Stallions	2	Cleveland Force	6	
Sunday	12/7/1980	Hartford Hellions	4	Chicago Horizons	2	
Sunday	12/7/1980	San Francisco Fog	4	Wichita Wings	8	
Tuesday	12/9/1980	San Francisco Fog	4	Baltimore Blast	3	OT
Wednesday	12/10/1980	Wichita Wings	7	Chicago Horizons	6	
Wednesday	12/10/1980	San Francisco Fog	5	Phoenix Inferno	11	
Thursday	12/11/1980	New York Arrows	5	Hartford Hellions	3	
Thursday	12/11/1980	Cleveland Force	6	Wichita Wings	5	OT
Friday	12/12/1980	Philadelphia Fever	7	Cleveland Force	6	
Friday	12/12/1980	Phoenix Inferno	5	Buffalo Stallions	13	
Friday	12/12/1980	Denver Avalanche	3	St. Louis Steamers	6	
Saturday	12/13/1980	Baltimore Blast	3	Philadelphia Fever	4	
Saturday	12/13/1980	Wichita Wings	6	Hartford Hellions	2	
Saturday	12/13/1980	New York Arrows	8	Denver Avalanche	4	
Sunday	12/14/1980	Buffalo Stallions	6	Chicago Horizons	7	OT
Sunday	12/14/1980	Hartford Hellions	4	Cleveland Force	5	OT
Sunday	12/14/1980	Phoenix Inferno	4	Baltimore Blast	6	
Sunday	12/14/1980	New York Arrows	9	St. Louis Steamers	5	
Tuesday	12/16/1980	Wichita Wings	0	Philadelphia Fever	3	
Wednesday	12/17/1980	Philadelphia Fever	5	Chicago Horizons	4	OT
Wednesday	12/17/1980	Buffalo Stallions	1	St. Louis Steamers	4	
Wednesday	12/17/1980	New York Arrows	11	San Francisco Fog	6	
Thursday	12/18/1980	Wichita Wings	4	Baltimore Blast	8	
Friday	12/19/1980	Wichita Wings	4	Buffalo Stallions	9	
Friday	12/19/1980	New York Arrows	5	Hartford Hellions	3	
Friday	12/19/1980	Chicago Horizons	6	Cleveland Force	9	
Friday	12/19/1980	San Francisco Fog	2	Denver Avalanche	5	
Saturday	12/20/1980	Philadelphia Fever	3	Phoenix Inferno	6	
Saturday	12/20/1980	St. Louis Steamers	11	San Francisco Fog	3	
Sunday	12/21/1980	Denver Avalanche	3	Cleveland Force	6	
Sunday	12/21/1980	Hartford Hellions	7	Baltimore Blast	5	
Sunday	12/21/1980	Chicago Horizons	5	New York Arrows	6	
Sunday	12/21/1980	Phoenix Inferno	4	St. Louis Steamers	7	
Monday	12/22/1980	Philadelphia Fever	4	Hartford Hellions	3	
Tuesday	12/23/1980	Phoenix Inferno	3	Denver Avalanche	5	
Tuesday	12/23/1980	Cleveland Force	4	San Francisco Fog	3	
Friday	12/26/1980	St. Louis Steamers	6	Chicago Horizons	5	OT
Friday	12/26/1980	Phoenix Inferno	6	Wichita Wings	8	
Friday	12/26/1980	Hartford Hellions	2	San Francisco Fog	3	
Saturday	12/27/1980	New York Arrows	6	Buffalo Stallions	5	OT
Saturday	12/27/1980	Cleveland Force	3	St. Louis Steamers	4	
Sunday	12/28/1980	Baltimore Blast	3	Cleveland Force	10	
Sunday	12/28/1980	San Francisco Fog	0	Wichita Wings	8	
Sunday	12/28/1980	Chicago Horizons	3	Denver Avalanche	5	
Sunday	12/28/1980	Hartford Hellions	8	Phoenix Inferno	13	
Monday	12/29/1980	San Francisco Fog	4	St. Louis Steamers	8	
Tuesday	12/30/1980	Philadelphia Fever	4	Chicago Horizons	9	
Friday	1/2/1981	Philadelphia Fever	6	St. Louis Steamers	5	
Friday	1/2/1981	Chicago Horizons	7	Buffalo Stallions	10	
Friday	1/2/1981	Denver Avalanche	3	New York Arrows	8	
Friday	1/2/1981	Cleveland Force	0	Wichita Wings	10	
Friday	1/2/1981	Baltimore Blast	5	Phoenix Inferno	2	
Saturday	1/3/1981	Denver Avalanche	2	Hartford Hellions	5	
Saturday	1/3/1981	Baltimore Blast	9	San Francisco Fog	6	
Sunday	1/4/1981	Philadelphia Fever	3	New York Arrows	4	
Sunday	1/4/1981	Chicago Horizons	3	Cleveland Force	4	
Sunday	1/4/1981	Wichita Wings	2	St. Louis Steamers	11	
Tuesday	1/6/1981	Baltimore Blast	10	Philadelphia Fever	4	
Tuesday	1/6/1981	Buffalo Stallions	4	Chicago Horizons	2	
Thursday	1/8/1981	Phoenix Inferno	5	Denver Avalanche	7	
Friday	1/9/1981	St. Louis Steamers	1	Buffalo Stallions	7	
Friday	1/9/1981	San Francisco Fog	5	Cleveland Force	6	
Friday	1/9/1981	Phoenix Inferno	1	New York Arrows	10	
Friday	1/9/1981	Baltimore Blast	3	Wichita Wings	10	
Saturday	1/10/1981	Chicago Horizons	11	Philadelphia Fever	4	
Saturday	1/10/1981	Hartford Hellions	3	St. Louis Steamers	7	
Saturday	1/10/1981	Baltimore Blast	2	Denver Avalanche	5	
Sunday	1/11/1981	Buffalo Stallions	5	Cleveland Force	6	
Sunday	1/11/1981	San Francisco Fog	2	New York Arrows	5	
Monday	1/12/1981	Buffalo Stallions	2	Wichita Wings	6	
Tuesday	1/13/1981	Chicago Horizons	7	St. Louis Steamers	6	OT
Wednesday	1/14/1981	Hartford Hellions	6	Philadelphia Fever	7	
Wednesday	1/14/1981	Phoenix Inferno	3	Chicago Horizons	7	
Wednesday	1/14/1981	New York Arrows	4	Denver Avalanche	3	
Thursday	1/15/1981	Wichita Wings	3	Phoenix Inferno	4	
Friday	1/16/1981	Philadelphia Fever	6	Denver Avalanche	4	
Friday	1/16/1981	Buffalo Stallions	5	St. Louis Steamers	6	OT
Friday	1/16/1981	Baltimore Blast	2	Hartford Hellions	4	
Friday	1/16/1981	Cleveland Force	7	New York Arrows	10	
Saturday	1/17/1981	Denver Avalanche	2	Phoenix Inferno	6	
Sunday	1/18/1981	Philadelphia Fever	4	Hartford Hellions	3	
Sunday	1/18/1981	Chicago Horizons	6	Buffalo Stallions	8	
Sunday	1/18/1981	Baltimore Blast	5	New York Arrows	12	
Sunday	1/18/1981	Wichita Wings	5	St. Louis Steamers	8	
Tuesday	1/20/1981	Cleveland Force	5	Philadelphia Fever	9	
Tuesday	1/20/1981	Wichita Wings	6	Denver Avalanche	7	
Wednesday	1/21/1981	St. Louis Steamers	3	Cleveland Force	1	
Wednesday	1/21/1981	Denver Avalanche	1	Wichita Wings	2	
Thursday	1/22/1981	New York Arrows	4	Baltimore Blast	3	
Thursday	1/22/1981	Phoenix Inferno	3	Hartford Hellions	7	
Friday	1/23/1981	Philadelphia Fever	8	New York Arrows	10	
Friday	1/23/1981	Cleveland Force	5	Buffalo Stallions	3	
Friday	1/23/1981	Chicago Horizons	5	St. Louis Steamers	6	
Friday	1/23/1981	Wichita Wings	5	San Francisco Fog	2	
Saturday	1/24/1981	Buffalo Stallions	5	Philadelphia Fever	0	
Saturday	1/24/1981	Chicago Horizons	4	Baltimore Blast	7	
Saturday	1/24/1981	Hartford Hellions	4	Cleveland Force	5	OT
Saturday	1/24/1981	St. Louis Steamers	7	Phoenix Inferno	9	
Monday	1/26/1981	Buffalo Stallions	6	Denver Avalanche	7	SO
Tuesday	1/27/1981	Philadelphia Fever	3	Wichita Wings	8	
Tuesday	1/27/1981	Buffalo Stallions	4	San Francisco Fog	5	OT
Tuesday	1/27/1981	St. Louis Steamers	4	Hartford Hellions	6	
Wednesday	1/28/1981	Wichita Wings	5	Cleveland Force	6	OT
Thursday	1/29/1981	Hartford Hellions	2	Baltimore Blast	5	
Thursday	1/29/1981	Denver Avalanche	7	San Francisco Fog	4	
Friday	1/30/1981	Philadelphia Fever	8	Buffalo Stallions	12	
Friday	1/30/1981	Hartford Hellions	8	New York Arrows	9	OT
Friday	1/30/1981	Phoenix Inferno	7	Cleveland Force	4	
Friday	1/30/1981	St. Louis Steamers	8	Wichita Wings	6	
Saturday	1/31/1981	Phoenix Inferno	5	Baltimore Blast	6	
Saturday	1/31/1981	Cleveland Force	1	Chicago Horizons	5	
Saturday	1/31/1981	San Francisco Fog	5	Denver Avalanche	3	
Sunday	2/1/1981	Philadelphia Fever	5	Baltimore Blast	6	SO
Sunday	2/1/1981	Wichita Wings	4	Buffalo Stallions	5	
Sunday	2/1/1981	Chicago Horizons	1	Hartford Hellions	3	
Sunday	2/1/1981	St. Louis Steamers	4	New York Arrows	3	OT
Monday	2/2/1981	Phoenix Inferno	4	Denver Avalanche	11	
Tuesday	2/3/1981	Baltimore Blast	3	Philadelphia Fever	4	
Tuesday	2/3/1981	Phoenix Inferno	1	Wichita Wings	8	
Thursday	2/5/1981	Buffalo Stallions	1	Chicago Horizons	6	
Thursday	2/5/1981	San Francisco Fog	2	Hartford Hellions	3	
Thursday	2/5/1981	Wichita Wings	4	Denver Avalanche	5	
Thursday	2/5/1981	Cleveland Force	8	Phoenix Inferno	5	
Friday	2/6/1981	Philadelphia Fever	7	New York Arrows	11	
Friday	2/6/1981	San Francisco Fog	3	St. Louis Steamers	10	
Friday	2/6/1981	Hartford Hellions	4	Wichita Wings	8	
Saturday	2/7/1981	St. Louis Steamers	4	Buffalo Stallions	8	
Saturday	2/7/1981	Denver Avalanche	2	Phoenix Inferno	6	
Sunday	2/8/1981	Chicago Horizons	6	Buffalo Stallions	4	
Sunday	2/8/1981	Hartford Hellions	2	New York Arrows	9	
Sunday	2/8/1981	Baltimore Blast	5	Cleveland Force	4	OT
Monday	2/9/1981	Baltimore Blast	6	San Francisco Fog	3	
Wednesday	2/11/1981	West All-Stars	8	East All-Stars	5	
Thursday	2/12/1981	St. Louis Steamers	6	Baltimore Blast	3	
Thursday	2/12/1981	Hartford Hellions	3	Phoenix Inferno	4	OT
Friday	2/13/1981	Buffalo Stallions	7	Cleveland Force	3	
Friday	2/13/1981	Baltimore Blast	4	New York Arrows	2	
Friday	2/13/1981	St. Louis Steamers	4	Chicago Horizons	7	
Friday	2/13/1981	Hartford Hellions	4	San Francisco Fog	6	
Saturday	2/14/1981	Denver Avalanche	1	Philadelphia Fever	7	
Saturday	2/14/1981	Wichita Wings	4	Phoenix Inferno	5	OT
Sunday	2/15/1981	Buffalo Stallions	2	Baltimore Blast	3	
Sunday	2/15/1981	St. Louis Steamers	1	New York Arrows	6	
Sunday	2/15/1981	San Francisco Fog	4	Chicago Horizons	5	
Monday	2/16/1981	Phoenix Inferno	6	Philadelphia Fever	5	
Tuesday	2/17/1981	New York Arrows	4	Baltimore Blast	3	
Tuesday	2/17/1981	Cleveland Force	3	Chicago Horizons	5	
Wednesday	2/18/1981	Buffalo Stallions	14	Phoenix Inferno	4	
Wednesday	2/18/1981	St. Louis Steamers	5	Cleveland Force	6	
Wednesday	2/18/1981	Wichita Wings	5	Denver Avalanche	4	
Wednesday	2/18/1981	Chicago Horizons	7	San Francisco Fog	6	
Thursday	2/19/1981	New York Arrows	7	Philadelphia Fever	4	
Thursday	2/19/1981	Baltimore Blast	4	Hartford Hellions	3	
Friday	2/20/1981	Chicago Horizons	2	Cleveland Force	4	
Friday	2/20/1981	Denver Avalanche	3	St. Louis Steamers	6	
Friday	2/20/1981	San Francisco Fog	4	Wichita Wings	8	
Saturday	2/21/1981	Chicago Horizons	4	Hartford Hellions	3	
Saturday	2/21/1981	Denver Avalanche	6	Baltimore Blast	5	
Saturday	2/21/1981	San Francisco Fog	4	Phoenix Inferno	10	
Sunday	2/22/1981	Baltimore Blast	3	Buffalo Stallions	5	
Sunday	2/22/1981	St. Louis Steamers	3	Cleveland Force	13	
Sunday	2/22/1981	Wichita Wings	7	New York Arrows	10	
Sunday	2/22/1981	Hartford Hellions	5	Philadelphia Fever	7	
Tuesday	2/24/1981	Denver Avalanche	2	Hartford Hellions	5	
Tuesday	2/24/1981	New York Arrows	6	Baltimore Blast	3	
Tuesday	2/24/1981	Wichita Wings	5	San Francisco Fog	6	OT
Wednesday	2/25/1981	Phoenix Inferno	5	Chicago Horizons	3	
Thursday	2/26/1981	Hartford Hellions	2	Baltimore Blast	3	
Thursday	2/26/1981	Cleveland Force	5	Denver Avalanche	4	
Friday	2/27/1981	Philadelphia Fever	12	San Francisco Fog	11	
Friday	2/27/1981	Buffalo Stallions	7	St. Louis Steamers	4	
Friday	2/27/1981	Cleveland Force	3	Chicago Horizons	4	
Friday	2/27/1981	Phoenix Inferno	3	Wichita Wings	8	
Sunday	3/1/1981	New York Arrows	9	Philadelphia Fever	5	
Sunday	3/1/1981	Cleveland Force	4	Buffalo Stallions	7	
Sunday	3/1/1981	Chicago Horizons	4	St. Louis Steamers	3	
Sunday	3/1/1981	Phoenix Inferno	5	San Francisco Fog	2	
Monday	3/2/1981	Chicago Horizons	3	Denver Avalanche	4	
Tuesday	3/3/1981	Phoenix Inferno	7	Philadelphia Fever	6	
Tuesday	3/3/1981	Denver Avalanche	2	Wichita Wings	6	
Wednesday	3/4/1981	Wichita Wings	7	San Francisco Fog	3	
Thursday	3/5/1981	Philadelphia Fever	3	Baltimore Blast	4	
Thursday	3/5/1981	Buffalo Stallions	6	Phoenix Inferno	7	OT
Thursday	3/5/1981	New York Arrows	11	Hartford Hellions	4	
Friday	3/6/1981	Cleveland Force	4	St. Louis Steamers	10	
Friday	3/6/1981	Denver Avalanche	9	San Francisco Fog	7	
Saturday	3/7/1981	Hartford Hellions	10	Philadelphia Fever	3	
Saturday	3/7/1981	New York Arrows	4	Buffalo Stallions	8	
Saturday	3/7/1981	Baltimore Blast	2	Wichita Wings	6	
Saturday	3/7/1981	Denver Avalanche	10	Phoenix Inferno	7	
Sunday	3/8/1981	Cleveland Force	7	Philadelphia Fever	11	
Sunday	3/8/1981	Hartford Hellions	4	Buffalo Stallions	5	
Sunday	3/8/1981	Chicago Horizons	7	New York Arrows	8	OT
Sunday	3/8/1981	Phoenix Inferno	9	San Francisco Fog	11	
Sunday	3/8/1981	St. Louis Steamers	4	Baltimore Blast	5	
Thursday	3/12/1981	Cleveland Force	5	Baltimore Blast	6	OT
Thursday	3/12/1981	Wichita Wings	3	Chicago Horizons	4	
Friday	3/13/1981	Buffalo Stallions	4	St. Louis Steamers	6	
Saturday	3/14/1981	Baltimore Blast	1	Cleveland Force	7	
Sunday	3/15/1981	Cleveland Force	5	Baltimore Blast	6	
Wednesday	3/18/1981	Chicago Horizons	4	Wichita Wings	6	
Thursday	3/19/1981	New York Arrows	6	Phoenix Inferno	10	
Saturday	3/21/1981	St. Louis Steamers	6	Buffalo Stallions	5	
Saturday	3/21/1981	Phoenix Inferno	6	New York Arrows	10	
Monday	3/23/1981	Chicago Horizons	6	Wichita Wings	8	
Tuesday	3/24/1981	Phoenix Inferno	5	New York Arrows	6	
Friday	3/27/1981	Baltimore Blast	1	New York Arrows	10	
Friday	3/27/1981	Wichita Wings	7	St. Louis Steamers	7	SO (3-1 STL)
Sunday	3/29/1981	New York Arrows	6	St. Louis Steamers	5	

== Final standings ==
Playoff teams in bold.

Atlantic Division	W	L	Pct.	GB	GF	GA	Home	Road
**New York Arrows**	35	5	.875	--	285	176	17-3	18-2
**Baltimore Blast**	21	19	.525	14	182	190	13-7	8-12
Philadelphia Fever	18	22	.450	17	212	245	10-10	8-12
Hartford Hellions	13	27	.188	22	165	192	10-10	3-17

Central Division	W	L	Pct.	GB	GF	GA	Home	Road
**St. Louis Steamers**	25	15	.625	--	222	196	15-5	10-10
**Cleveland Force**	21	19	.525	4	209	214	14-6	7-13
**Chicago Horizons**	20	20	.500	5	216	187	13-7	7-13
**Buffalo Stallions**	20	20	.500	5	246	210	15-5	5-15

Western Division	W	L	Pct.	GB	GF	GA	Home	Road
**Wichita Wings**	23	17	.575	--	228	181	18-2	5-15
**Phoenix Inferno**	17	23	.425	6	210	254	12-8	5-15
Denver Avalanche	16	24	.400	7	174	217	12-8	4-16
San Francisco Fog	11	29	.275	12	175	271	7-13	4-16

== Playoffs ==
Quarterfinals
1	New York Arrows	2
8	Phoenix Inferno	1
4	Baltimore Blast	2
5	Cleveland Force	1
2	St. Louis Steamers	2
7	Buffalo Stallions	0
3	Wichita Wings	2
6	Chicago Horizons	1

Semifinals
1	New York Arrows	10
4	Baltimore Blast	1
2	St. Louis Steamers	7 (3)
3	Wichita Wings	7 (1)

Championship Game
1	New York Arrows	6
2	St. Louis Steamers	5

=== Quarterfinals ===
New York vs. Phoenix
Date	Away	Home	Attendance
March 19	New York 6	**Phoenix 10**	8,719
March 21	Phoenix 6	**New York 10**	12,488
March 24	Phoenix 5	**New York 6**	6,315
**New York wins series 2-1**

Baltimore vs. Cleveland
Date	Away	Home	Attendance
March 12	Cleveland 5	**Baltimore 6**	7,461
	Dan Counce scored at 14:06 of overtime
March 14	Baltimore 1	**Cleveland 7**	10,639
March 15	Cleveland 5	**Baltimore 6**	7,692
**Baltimore wins series 2-1**

St. Louis vs. Buffalo
Date	Away	Home	Attendance
March 13	Buffalo 4	**St. Louis 6**	11,667
March 21	**St. Louis 6**	Buffalo 5	16,329
**St. Louis wins series 2-0**

Wichita vs. Chicago
Date	Away	Home	Attendance
March 12	Wichita 3	**Chicago 4**	4,313
March 18	Chicago 4	**Wichita 6**	7,309
March 23	Chicago 6	**Wichita 8**	7,753
**Wichita wins series 2-1**

=== Semifinals ===
New York vs. Baltimore: Date / Away / Home / Attendance; March 27 / Baltimore 1 / **New York 10** / 16,236	St. Louis vs. Wichita: Date / Away / Home / Attendance; March 27 / Wichita 7 / **St. Louis 7** / 16,236; St. Louis wins shootout 3-1

=== Championship Game ===
St. Louis vs. New York
Date	Away	Home	Attendance
March 29	**New York 6**	St. Louis 5	17,206

== Regular Season Player Statistics ==
=== Scoring leaders ===
GP = Games Played, G = Goals, A = Assists, Pts = Points

Player	Team	GP	G	A	Pts
(Socialist Federal Republic of Yugoslavia) Steve Zungul	New York Arrows	40	108	44	152
(Canada) Branko Segota	New York Arrows	35	38	45	83
(Socialist Federal Republic of Yugoslavia) Charlie Cordas	Buffalo Stallions	36	40	41	81
(Scotland) Vic Davidson	Phoenix Inferno	30	50	29	79
(Socialist Federal Republic of Yugoslavia) Iubo Petrovic	Buffalo Stallions	39	44	33	77
(United States) Joey Fink	Philadelphia Fever	39	51	18	69
(United States) Fred Grgurev	Philadelphia Fever	37	44	25	69
(Denmark) Jorgen Kristensen	Wichita Wings	38	14	52	66
(United States) Don Ebert	St. Louis Steamers	40	46	19	65
(United States) Dave MacWilliams	Philadelphia Fever	37	37	28	65

=== Leading Goalkeepers ===
Note: GP = Games played; Min = Minutes played; GA = Goals against; GAA = Goals against average; W = Wins; L = Losses

Player	Team	GP	Min	GA	GAA	W	L
(Italy) Enzo DiPede	Chicago Horizons	16	931	63	4.06	9	6
(Wales) Mike Dowler	Wichita Wings	28	1616	111	4.12	16	12
(United States) Sepp Gantenhammer	Baltimore Blast	33	1862	130	4.19	17	14
(Hungary) Zoltán Tóth	New York Arrows	22	1005	73	4.36	14	2
(United States) Shep Messing	New York Arrows	27	1411	103	4.38	21	3
(England) Aly Anderson	Denver Avalanche	10	506	38	4.51	4	4
(Poland) Richard But	Hartford Hellions	39	2262	175	4.64	12	25
(Socialist Federal Republic of Yugoslavia) Slobo Ilijevski	St. Louis Steamers	33	1878	146	4.66	21	11
(United States) Pascal Antoine	Denver Avalanche	13	698	56	4.81	7	5
(United States) Scott Manning	Buffalo Stallions	29	1380	112	4.87	13	12

== Playoff Player Statistics ==
=== Scoring leaders ===
GP = Games Played, G = Goals, A = Assists, Pts = Points

Player	Team	GP	G	A	Pts
(Socialist Federal Republic of Yugoslavia) Steve Zungul	New York Arrows	3	15	4	19
(Canada) Branko Segota	New York Arrows	3	9	6	15
(England) Andy Chapman	Wichita Wings	4	11	0	11
(Scotland) Tony Glavin	St. Louis Steamers	4	8	2	10
(United States) George Nanchoff	Phoenix Inferno	3	6	4	10

=== Leading Goalkeepers ===
Note: GP = Games played; Min = Minutes played; GA = Goals against; GAA = Goals against average; W = Wins; L = Losses

Player	Team	GP	Min	GA	GAA	W	L
(United States) Cliff Brown	Cleveland Force	3	188	12	3.83	1	2
(Wales) Mike Dowler	Wichita Wings	4	225	19	5.07	2	1
(United States) Scott Manning	Buffalo Stallions	2	94	8	5.09	0	1
(Socialist Federal Republic of Yugoslavia) Slobo Ilijevski	St. Louis Steamers	4	255	22	5.18	3	1
(Hungary) Zoltán Tóth	New York Arrows	2	69	6	5.22	1	0

== All-MISL Teams ==
First Team	Position	Second Team
(United States) Shep Messing, New York	G	(Poland) Richard But, Hartford
(United States) Dave D'Errico, New York	D	(United States) Doc Lawson, Philadelphia
Steve Pecher, St. Louis	D	Jim Pollihan, Baltimore
(Scotland) Ian Anderson, Cleveland		
(Scotland) Tony Glavin, St. Louis	M	(Scotland) Vic Davidson, Phoenix
(Socialist Federal Republic of Yugoslavia) Steve Zungul, New York	F	(England) Paul Kitson, Chicago
(Canada) Branko Segota, New York	F	(Socialist Federal Republic of Yugoslavia) Charlie Cordas, Buffalo

Honorable Mention	Position	
(United States) Sepp Gantenhammer, Baltimore	G	(Socialist Federal Republic of Yugoslavia) Slobo Ilijevski, St. Louis
(United States) Ty Keough, St. Louis	D	(United States) Tony Bellinger, St. Louis
(Northern Ireland) Adrian Brooks, Denver	M	(United States) Johnny Moore, San Francisco
(United States) Joey Fink, Philadelphia	F	(Denmark) Jorgen Kristensen, Wichita

== League awards ==
- Most Valuable Player: (Socialist Federal Republic of Yugoslavia) Steve Zungul, New York
- Scoring Champion: (Socialist Federal Republic of Yugoslavia) Steve Zungul, New York
- Pass Master: (Denmark) Jorgen Kristiansen, Wichita
- Rookie of the Year: (United States) Don Ebert, St. Louis
- Goalkeeper of the Year: Enzo DiPede, Chicago
- Coach of the Year: (Canada) Don Popovic, New York
- Championship Series Most Valuable Player: (Socialist Federal Republic of Yugoslavia) Steve Zungul, New York
