= Damir Šutevski =

Yugoslav footballer (1954–2020)

Personal information
- Date of birth: 28 September 1954
- Place of birth: Zagreb, PR Croatia, FPR Yugoslavia
- Date of death: 29 October 2020 (aged 66)
- Place of death: Zagreb, Croatia
- Position: Defender

Youth career
- Dinamo Zagreb

Senior career*
Years	Team	Apps	(Gls)
1974	Toronto Croatia		
1975–1978	Toronto Metros-Croatia	81	(3)
1978–1981	New York Arrows (indoor)	82	(66)
1979–1980	Rochester Lancers	54	(1)
1981	Montreal Manic	26	(0)
1981–1982	Montreal Manic (indoor)	17	(10)
1982–1983	Phoenix Inferno (indoor)	45	(27)
1983–1984	Phoenix Pride (indoor)	43	(26)
1984–1985	Las Vegas Americans (indoor)	21	(5)
- * Club domestic league appearances and goals

Damir Šutevski (28 September 1954 – 29 October 2020) was an association football player from Yugoslavia who played for Canadian and American clubs.

== Career ==
Šutevski came from Zagreb, at the time in Yugoslavia, and originally played in the National Soccer League with Toronto Croatia in 1974. He played in the NASL between 1975 and 1982 for the Toronto Metros-Croatia, Rochester Lancers and Montreal Manic. In 1978, he signed with the New York Arrows of the Major Indoor Soccer League, and played three seasons with them. In 1982, he moved to the Phoenix Inferno for two seasons. He then spent the 1984–1985 season with the Phoenix Pride before finishing his career with one season with the Las Vegas Americans during 1984 and 1985.
