= 1988–89 Major Indoor Soccer League season =

Major Indoor Soccer League
- Season: 1988–89
- Champions: San Diego Sockers (5th title)
- Matches: 168
- Goals: 1,452 (8.64 per match)
- Top goalscorer: (United States) Preki (51 goals)
- Average attendance: 7,805

The 1988–89 Major Indoor Soccer League season was the eleventh in league history and would end with the San Diego Sockers repeating as MISL champions. It was the Sockers' seventh indoor title in eight NASL and MISL seasons. The Sockers would win seventh games in both the semifinals and championship series.

== Recap ==
The league very nearly did not make it to the fall of 1988 as both labor negotiations and rising costs threatened to fold the league. The St. Louis Steamers, Minnesota Strikers, Cleveland Force and Chicago Sting dropped out over the course of the summer. Plans for a 60-game schedule were scrapped, and a new labor agreement was signed on July 16.

The remaining seven teams would play a 48-game schedule that would see the top five teams qualify for the playoffs. The fourth and fifth-place teams would play each other, while the first-place team would play the winner in the league semifinals. The second and third-place teams played in the other semifinal, and the semifinal winners would play in the league championship series.

After the season, the Los Angeles Lazers folded and new franchises were placed in St. Louis and Cleveland for the 1989–90 season.

== Teams ==
Team	City/Area	Arena
Baltimore Blast	Baltimore, Maryland	Baltimore Arena
Dallas Sidekicks	Dallas, Texas	Reunion Arena
Kansas City Comets	Kansas City, Missouri	Kemper Arena
Los Angeles Lazers	Inglewood, California	The Forum
San Diego Sockers	San Diego, California	San Diego Sports Arena
Tacoma Stars	Tacoma, Washington	Tacoma Dome
Wichita Wings	Wichita, Kansas	Kansas Coliseum

== Map of clubs ==
Major Indoor Soccer League clubs

== Regular season schedule ==
The 1988–89 regular season schedule ran from November 4, 1988, to April 18, 1989. At 48 games, it was a decrease of eight games per team compared to the previous season.

== Final standings ==
Team	Pld	HW	HL	AW	AL	GF	GA	GD	GB	PCT	Qualification
Baltimore Blast	48	16	8	13	11	215	208	+7	—	.604	Playoffs
San Diego Sockers	48	17	7	10	14	220	168	+52	2	.563	Playoffs
Dallas Sidekicks	48	15	9	9	15	185	206	−21	5	.500	Playoffs
Tacoma Stars	48	14	10	9	15	208	207	+1	6	.479	Playoffs
Wichita Wings	48	15	9	8	16	212	208	+4	6	.479	Playoffs
Kansas City Comets	48	12	12	9	15	218	222	−4	8	.438	
Los Angeles Lazers	48	14	10	7	17	194	233	−39	8	.438	

== Playoffs ==
Wildcard Series
4	Tacoma Stars	1
5	Wichita Wings	3

Semifinals
1	Baltimore Blast	4
5	Wichita Wings	2
2	San Diego Sockers	4
3	Dallas Sidekicks	3

Championship Series
1	Baltimore Blast	3
2	San Diego Sockers	4

=== Wildcard Series ===
Tacoma vs. Wichita
Date	Away	Home	Attendance
April 28	Wichita 4	Tacoma 1	4,193
April 29	Wichita 4	Tacoma 1	4,338
May 6	Tacoma 5	Wichita 4	9,320
May 8	Tacoma 2	Wichita 6	6,200
Wichita wins series 3-1

=== Semifinals ===
Baltimore vs. Wichita
Date	Away	Home	Attendance
May 13	Wichita 4	Baltimore 5	7,105
	David Byrne scored at 5:20 of overtime
May 16	Wichita 4	Baltimore 6	5,450
May 18	Baltimore 6	Wichita 4	6,027
May 19	Baltimore 3	Wichita 6	6,102
May 22	Baltimore 5	Wichita 7	6,187
May 24	Wichita 1	Baltimore 11	6,194
Baltimore wins series 4-2

San Diego vs. Dallas
Date	Away	Home	Attendance
May 3	Dallas 4	San Diego 7	6,483
May 6	Dallas 5	San Diego 4	9,289
May 12	San Diego 5	Dallas 4	6,285
	Steve Zungul scored at 11:12 of overtime
May 13	San Diego 3	Dallas 7	7,015
May 16	San Diego 1	Dallas 4	5,407
May 18	Dallas 2	San Diego 8	7,664
May 20	Dallas 0	San Diego 1	11,604
San Diego wins series 4-3

=== Championship Series ===
Baltimore vs. San Diego
Date	Away	Home	Attendance
May 29	San Diego 3	Baltimore 4	6,539
	Billy Ronson scored at 7:02 of overtime
May 30	San Diego 5	Baltimore 4	6,280
	Steve Zungul scored at 2:46 of overtime
June 2	Baltimore 2	San Diego 5	11,484
June 4	Baltimore 3	San Diego 4	11,147
June 6	Baltimore 6	San Diego 3	12,884
June 8	San Diego 0	Baltimore 7	6,990
June 10	San Diego 6	Baltimore 5	11,220
San Diego wins series 4-3

== Regular season player statistics ==
=== Scoring leaders ===
GP = Games Played, G = Goals, A = Assists, Pts = Points

Player	Team	GP	G	A	Pts
Preki	Tacoma Stars	48	51	53	104
Chico Borja	Wichita Wings	45	34	53	87
Dale Mitchell	Kansas City Comets	47	46	36	82
Erik Rasmussen	Wichita Wings	48	42	36	78
Hector Marinaro	Los Angeles Lazers	44	47	28	75
Gary Heale	Los Angeles Lazers	48	37	29	66
Tatu	Dallas Sidekicks	43	35	29	64
Branko Segota	San Diego Sockers	31	29	34	63
Peter Ward	Tacoma Stars	47	41	19	60
Carl Valentine	Baltimore Blast	46	31	26	57

=== Leading goalkeepers ===
Note: GP = Games played; Min – Minutes played; GA = Goals against; GAA = Goals against average; W = Wins; L = Losses

Player	Team	GP	Min	GA	GAA	W	L
Victor Nogueira	San Diego Sockers	33	1996	95	2.86	19	13
P.J. Johns	Tacoma Stars	31	1946	114	3.51	18	13
Scott Manning	Baltimore Blast	29	1596	102	3.83	17	9
Joe Papaleo	Dallas Sidekicks	24	1463	94	3.86	13	11
Cris Vaccaro	Wichita Wings	40	2298	154	4.02	22	14
Krys Sobieski	Dallas Sidekicks	23	1415	98	4.16	11	12
Slobo Ilijevski	Baltimore Blast	23	1232	89	4.34	12	9
Kris Peat	Los Angeles Lazers	24	1273	94	4.43	14	8
Mike Dowler	Tacoma Stars	17	1068	82	4.60	5	12

== Playoff Player Statistics ==
=== Scoring leaders ===
GP = Games Played, G = Goals, A = Assists, Pts = Points

Player	Team	GP	G	A	Pts
Billy Ronson	Baltimore Blast	13	17	8	25
Domenic Mobilo	Baltimore Blast	13	16	6	22
Branko Segota	San Diego Sockers	12	12	10	22
Chico Borja	Wichita Wings	10	10	9	19
David Byrne	Baltimore Blast	13	10	7	17

=== Leading goalkeepers ===
Note: GP = Games played; Min – Minutes played; GA = Goals against; GAA = Goals against average; W = Wins; L = Losses

Player	Team	GP	Min	GA	GAA	W	L
Joe Papaleo	Dallas Sidekicks	4	237	9	2.28	3	1
Victor Nogueira	San Diego Sockers	14	829	52	3.76	8	6
P.J. Johns	Tacoma Stars	3	171	11	3.86	1	2
Scott Manning	Baltimore Blast	13	740	48	3.89	7	5
Cris Vaccaro	Wichita Wings	10	569	44	4.64	5	5

== All-MISL Teams ==
First Team	Position	Second Team
Victor Nogueira, San Diego	G	Scott Manning, Baltimore
Kevin Crow, San Diego	D	Tim Wittman, Baltimore
Bruce Savage, Baltimore	D	Chico Moreira, Wichita
Chico Borja, Wichita	M	Branko Segota, San Diego
Preki, Tacoma	F	Hector Marinaro, Los Angeles
Dale Mitchell, Kansas City	F	Erik Rasmussen, Wichita

Honorable Mention	Position
P.J. Johns, Tacoma	G
Fernando Clavijo, Los Angeles	D
Mike Powers, Dallas	D
Kai Haaskivi, Baltimore	M
Tatu, Dallas	F
Carl Valentine, Baltimore	F

== League awards ==
Most Valuable Player: Preki, Tacoma

Scoring Champion: Preki, Tacoma

Pass Master: Preki, Tacoma/Chico Borja, Wichita

Defender of the Year: Kevin Crow, San Diego

Rookie of the Year: Rusty Troy, Baltimore

Newcomer of the Year: Domenic Mobilio, Baltimore

Goalkeeper of the Year: Victor Nogueira, San Diego

Coach of the Year: Kenny Cooper, Baltimore

Championship Series Most Valuable Player: Victor Nogueira, San Diego

Championship Series Unsung Hero: Paul Daugherty, San Diego

== Team Attendance Totals ==
Club	Games	Total	Average
Kansas City Comets	24	221,465	9,228
Wichita Wings	24	207,465	8,644
Dallas Sidekicks	24	205,607	8,567
San Diego Sockers	24	201,186	8,383
Baltimore Blast	24	196,068	8,170
Tacoma Stars	24	162,751	6,781
Los Angeles Lazers	24	116,774	4,866
OVERALL	168	1,311,316	7,805
