= Slaviša Žungul =

Yugoslavian footballer

Personal information
- Date of birth: 28 July 1954 (age 72)
- Place of birth: Požarevac, PR Serbia, FPR Yugoslavia
- Height: 5 ft 11 in (1.80 m)
- Position: Forward

Senior career*
Years	Team	Apps	(Gls)
1972–1978	Hajduk Split	178	(82)
1978–1983	New York Arrows (indoor)	145	(372)
1983–1984	Golden Bay Earthquakes (NASL)	46	(36)
1983–1984	Golden Bay Earthquakes	51	(39)
1984–1986	San Diego Sockers (indoor)	94	(123)
1986–1988	Tacoma Stars (indoor)	103	(89)
1988–1990	San Diego Sockers (indoor)	53	(21)
Total		670	(762)

International career
1974–1978	Yugoslavia	14	(0)
- * Club domestic league appearances and goals

Slaviša Žungul (born 28 July 1954), also known as Steve Zungul, is a Yugoslav American former soccer player who played as a striker.

Žungul began his career with Hajduk in his native Yugoslavia before controversially moving to the United States where he became a dominant indoor soccer striker. His indoor career began with the New York Arrows of Major Indoor Soccer League and ended with the San Diego Sockers. His amazing scoring ability earned him the nickname "Lord of All Indoors". He also spent two seasons playing outdoor soccer with the Golden Bay Earthquakes of the North American Soccer League. In 1984, he was the NASL MVP. He also earned fourteen caps with the Yugoslavia national football team between 1974 and 1978.

== Early life ==
Žungul was born Slaviša Ivanović in Požarevac. His biological father died when he was still an infant. His mother Danica quickly remarried and moved to Kaštel Lukšić near Split, PR Croatia where baby Slaviša was given his stepfather's last name.

== Club career ==
=== Hajduk Split ===
When he was sixteen, Žungul began his football career in Split, playing for Hajduk starting in 1972 and continuing until 1978. He led the team in scoring every season and finished his time at Hajduk with 176 goals. During his six years with the team, he led them to three Yugoslav First League titles, in 1974 and 1975 as well as four Yugoslav Cup trophies.

At Hajduk he quickly established himself as the focal point of head coach Tomislav Ivić's setup as well as becoming a fan favourite for his off-the-cuff ways and jet-set lifestyle. He was often seen in bars around the city while dating models, pinups, singers, and pageant contestants. His scoring prowess at Hajduk drew comparisons to Gerd Müller in the Yugoslav press.

By the time he turned 24, Žungul's prominence was such that he began receiving lucrative offers from NASL clubs in the United States. However, Yugoslav sporting regulations at the time stipulated that players could not transfer abroad until completing their mandatory Yugoslav People's Army (JNA) stint and turning 28 years of age. In certain cases exemptions were granted so that a player's transfer would be allowed in the calendar year during which he'll be turning 28 or even a year early, but the completion of the army stint was absolutely mandatory. While twenty-four-year-old Žungul was years away from even considering a move abroad, he was on increasingly bad terms with Hajduk management—led by club president Tito Kirigin—over unpaid wages. The star player became concerned the club would arrange for him to be sent off to his army service to further delay the payments they owed him.

On 3 December 1978, Žungul played in Hajduk's last league match before the 1978-79 mid-season winter break—a 5–0 home thrashing of FK Sarajevo at the Stari plac Stadium—scoring twice thus increasing his half-season scoring tally to 12 goals. He then asked the club management to allow him to travel to New York City for a few weeks in order to accompany his singer girlfriend Moni Kovačič (famous for appearing in Start, the Yugoslav counterpart to Playboy) while further disclosing to them that while in the U.S. he would also be taking part in a few exhibition indoor soccer matches in order to stay in competitive shape for the season restart. Not suspecting anything amiss, Hajduk granted permission.

In actuality, through countryman Dragan Popović, Žungul (represented by sports agent Ante "Bekin" Kuzmić) had already agreed a contract with the newly established, Popović-coached New York Arrows of the also recently launched Major Indoor Soccer League (MISL). Žungul's idea was to defect from Yugoslavia and play a few years of indoor soccer in the MISL, then switch over to "real soccer" in the NASL once the dust settled.

Within weeks, in late December 1978, his defection and deception became known back home, creating one of the biggest scandals in Yugoslav sporting history. Hajduk management subsequently orchestrated a smear campaign against Žungul in Yugoslav media, branding him a traitor, a deserter, and a drunk. They also asked the Yugoslav FA (FSJ) to enlist its FIFA connections and request a ban on Žungul taking part in any FIFA-affiliated competitions. FSJ did so and FIFA granted the ban, effectively blackballing him from the NASL. This left the MISL, which was not affiliated with FIFA, as his only option.

=== Indoor soccer: New York Arrows ===
Making his debut in the Arrows' opening game of the season in Nassau Coliseum, he immediately established his scoring credentials, recording four goals. He finished the campaign close second to Fred Grgurev in the 1978–79 season scoring race as the Arrows won the title. In his second season, Zungul led the MISL in goals scored in 1979–80, guiding his team to the second straight league title and winning the league MVP honours.

In the 1980–81 season, Zungul achieved a record of scoring 108 goals in 40 games in comparison to the second leading scorer Vic Davidson of the Phoenix Inferno having previously scored 50 goals. Zungul was well on his way to earning his eventual moniker of "The Lord of All Indoors", first given to him by Sports Illustrated writer JD Reed. The Arrows won the title again (their third straight), while Zungul won MVP for the second consecutive season.

Zungul picked up another 103 goals the next season, 1981–82, leading the team to a fourth consecutive league title while co-sharing the league MVP honour with Polish forward Stan Terlecki. All the while, Zungul pursued every legal avenue available to achieve his ultimate goal of playing outdoor soccer. He took his case to the Supreme Court of the United States and finally managed to procure a licence to play on the big pitch.

For the 1982–83 season, he began the campaign with the Arrows. However, the Arrows were already in decline, and his scoring rate a of dip when compared to previous seasons. Now 28-years-of-age, in January 1983, he asked for an increase of his $150,000 annual paycheck, an amount he knew that the financially strapped management could not afford. The Arrows responded by trading him to the Golden Bay Earthquakes of the North American Soccer League (NASL), who were playing the 1982–83 MISL season as a guest team, for Gary Etherington and Gordon Hill. While billed as a move to "Americanize" the Arrows, it was largely a cost saving device. While Zungul still led the league in scoring, he bagged only 75 goals.

Now the FIFA ban became the issue once again, and FSJ chimed in, asking for the ban to be upheld. It wasn't, due to the Earthquakes refusing to honour it by referencing the US Supreme Court decision, meaning the player would get his chance in the outdoor game again following a four-year absence.

=== Return to outdoor: Golden Bay Earthquakes ===
Zungul went on to become a first team NASL All Star in both 1983 and 1984.

In 1984, he capped his outdoor career by being named the NASL MVP. That year, Zungul registered 20 goals and 10 assists in 24 games, but could not keep the Earthquakes out of the bottom of the Western Conference.

Meanwhile, without Zungul's scoring touch the Arrows collapsed and folded at the end of the 1983–84 season.

=== Back to indoor: San Diego Sockers and Tacoma Stars ===
When the NASL itself collapsed at the end of the 1984 season, Zungul moved to the San Diego Sockers (MISL). He led the league again in scoring in 1985 and 1986. On 5 February 1986, the Sockers sold Zungul to the Tacoma Stars where he played from 1986 to 1988. In 1988, he returned to the Sockers where he ended his career in 1990. It was not until 1987 that his run as top scorer finally came to a close, as another indoor luminary, the Dallas Sidekicks' Tatu, took Zungul's place at the top of the scoring charts. Zungul was also named the league's MVP from 1979 to 1982, and then again in 1985 and 1986. At one time, he was the all-time goal scoring leader in indoor soccer with 715 goals. That currently ranks fourth behind Hector Marinaro, Zoran Karić, and Tatu.

== International career ==
Žungul made his debut for Yugoslavia in a September 1974 friendly match against Italy, coming on as a 46th-minute substitute for Danilo Popivoda, and earned a total of 14 caps, scoring no goals. He played in Euro 1976 but never played in the World Cup because he did not serve the mandatory stint in the Yugoslav People's Army (JNA). His final international was an October 1978 European Championship qualification match away against Romania.

== Post-playing ==
Simultaneous to playing soccer in America, Žungul invested his earnings in various business ventures including real-estate. He has at one time owned properties in Wellington, Florida.

Žungul reportedly resides in San Pasqual Valley near Escondido, California with his wife Lorenza and their two children Sashka and Marco.

In 2023, he was inducted into the National Soccer Hall of Fame.
