= Zoltán Tóth (footballer, born 1955) =

Hungarian footballer and coach

Zoltan Toth
Personal information
- Date of birth: 29 December 1955 (age 70)
- Place of birth: Budapest, Hungary
- Height: 6 ft 3 in (1.91 m)
- Position: Goalkeeper

Senior career*
Years	Team	Apps	(Gls)
1975–1979	Újpest FC		
1980–1984	New York Arrows (indoor)	82	(?)
1984	San Diego Sockers	10	(0)
1984–1990	San Diego Sockers (indoor)	152	(?)
1990–1992	St. Louis Storm (indoor)	36	(?)

International career
1979	Hungary	1	(0)
- * Club domestic league appearances and goals

Zoltán Tóth (born 29 December 1955 in Budapest) is a Hungarian former footballer who played as a goalkeeper and currently works as a coach. He played for Újpest FC in Budapest from 1975 to 1979 and once played for the Hungary national team in 1979.

== Life in Hungary ==
Tóth was born in Hungary to György Tóth, who played fifteen times with the Hungary national football team between 1939 and 1948. Tóth's talent was apparent early and he eventually also saw time with the Hungary himself. On a tour with the team in Cadiz, Spain in 1979, Tóth defected and moved to the United States. He also played on the Hungarian Olympic team.

== Professional ==
In addition to his national team time, Tóth spent four seasons with Hungarian First Division club Újpest FC. As one of the top Hungarian clubs, Újpest regularly played in the UEFA Cup and European Cup. They twice won the Hungarian national championship during Tóth's time, 1977–78 and 1978–79. In 1979, Tóth signed with the New York Arrows of Major Indoor Soccer League (MISL) for the 1980–81 season and got his start when Arrows' goalkeeper Shep Messing was injured. He was the 1982-1983 MISL Goalkeeper of the Year. Won 14 lost 2 in 1980–81 and won 15 lost 2 in 1981–82 season. Best winning percentage of all time. In 1984, he transferred to the San Diego Sockers of the North American Soccer League. He kept 7 clean sheets out of 10 games. The Sockers then moved to the MISL. Toth remained with the Sockers through the 1989–90 season. He was selected as the MISL Goalkeeper of the Decade for the 1980s. He holds the league record for wins and goals against average. He then played for the St. Louis Storm from 1990 to 1992.

== Coaching career ==
- 1980–1982 – Geza Henni Goalkeeper School Rhode Island University Goalkeeper coach Professional goalkeeper instructions
- 1984–1990 – San Diego Sockers Youth Soccer Programs San Diego, CA.
- 1990–1992 – American All-Stars Co., San Diego, CA. Youth Sports Athletic Director Responsible for team clinics, goalkeeper training
- 1992–1993 – Full-time professional coach. San Diego, California San Dieguito Surf U-16 boys' and U-9 girls' head coach Coached teams with success, winning Presidio Cup and North Huntington Beach tournament.
- 1993–1996 – coach of the Encinitas Express U-11 boys' teams
- 1997–2000 – coach of the Fallbrook Fury Soccer Club U-14 boys. Advise for Fallbrook's AAA U-10 boys' team.
- 2000 – SWSC Bu/19 team
- 2002–2007 – Goalkeeper coach Vista Soccer Club
- 2002–2007 – Goalkeeper coach TVSA Temecula Murrieta Soccer Club
- 2005–2007 – Goalkeeper coach Fallbrook Fury

== Awards and honors ==
In March 2013, Tóth was one of six men named to the 2013 class of the Indoor Soccer Hall of Fame. The other inductees are Gordon Jago, Preki, Kai Haaskivi, Brian Quinn, and Mike Stankovic.

== Personal ==
His son, Christopher, is the current goalkeeper for the Tacoma Stars and played for the United States national beach soccer team at the 2013 FIFA Beach Soccer World Cup in Tahiti and at the 2019 FIFA Beach Soccer World Cup in Paraguay. Toth, has three MASL Goalkeeper of the Year Awards. His father, György Tóth, represented Hungary in the 1930s and 1940s and coached Mali in the 1970s.
