= Eric Delabar =

American soccer player and coach

Personal information
- Date of birth: November 28, 1956 (age 69)
- Place of birth: St. Louis, Missouri, U.S.
- Position: Goalkeeper

Youth career
- 1976–1979: Quincy University

Senior career*
Years	Team	Apps	(Gls)
1979–1984	St. Louis Steamers (indoor)	17	(0)

Managerial career
- 1999–2017: Maryville University (women)
- 2002–2007: Maryville University (men)
- * Club domestic league appearances and goals

Eric Delabar is an American retired soccer goalkeeper who played professionally in the Major Indoor Soccer League. He is the head coach of the Maryville University women's soccer team.

== Player ==
=== Youth ===
Delabar grew up playing for St. Louis Kutis and graduated from De Smet Jesuit High School. He attended Quincy University, playing on the men's soccer team from 1976 to 1979. In 1977, 1977 and 1979, Quincy won the NAIA national men's soccer championship. Delabar was a 1978 NAIA First Team All American. He graduated with a bachelor's degree in history. In 1989, Quincy inducted Delabar into the school's Hall of Fame. In 2008, he was inducted into the NAIA Hall of Fame.

=== Professional ===
From 1979 to 1984, Delabar played for the St. Louis Steamers of the Major Indoor Soccer League.

== Coach ==
In 1989, Delabar became the head coach of the Fort Zumwalt North High School boys' soccer team, a position he held until 1998. He also served as an assistant coach at Washington University in St. Louis and Saint Louis University. In 1999, Maryville University hired Delabar as the women's soccer coach. In 2002, he also took on the role of men's team head coach. He compiled a 33-73-6 record with the men's team over six seasons.

He currently works at Fort Zumwalt School District's South Middle School as a Physical Education teacher.

In 2011, the St. Louis Soccer Hall of Fame inducted Delabar.
