= Tony Glavin =

Scottish footballer

Personal information
- Date of birth: 29 April 1958 (age 68)
- Place of birth: Glasgow, Scotland
- Position: Midfielder

Youth career
- 1975–1976: Queen's Park

Senior career*
Years	Team	Apps	(Gls)
1976–1978	Queen's Park	64	(7)
1978–1980	Philadelphia Fury	66	(13)
1979	Hamilton Academical	14	(5)
1980–1987	St. Louis Steamers (indoor)	153	(157)
1987–1991	Kansas City Comets (indoor)	29	(4)
Total		326	(186)

Managerial career
- 1983–1987: St. Louis Steamers (assistant)
- 1987–1988: Kansas City Comets
- 1990: Dayton Dynamo
- 1991–2000: St. Louis Kutis
- 2006–: St. Louis Lions
- 2015–2017: St. Louis Ambush
- * Club domestic league appearances and goals

Tony Glavin (born 29 April 1958) is a Scottish former professional footballer who played as a midfielder in both Scotland and the United States, making over 300 career appearances. His elder brother Ronnie was also a footballer.

== Playing career ==
Born in Glasgow, Glavin spent time in the Scottish Football League with both Queen's Park and Hamilton Academical, before playing in the United States (in both the North American Soccer League and the Major Indoor Soccer League) for the Philadelphia Fury, the St. Louis Steamers, and the Kansas City Comets.

== Coaching career ==
On 9 February 1987, the St. Louis Steamers fired head coach Pat McBride and replaced him with Glavin. Glavin then worked as an Assistant for the Kansas City Comets, playing a handful of games for them. In August 1990, he was hired to coach the Dayton Dynamo of the American Indoor Soccer Association. In 1994, he founded the "Tony Glavin Soccer Club" in Cottleville, Missouri. In December 2005, the United Soccer Leagues awarded a franchise to Glavin and his partners, which became the St. Louis Lions, to which Glavin was also named as Head Coach of the team, known as the St. Louis Lions. In December 2015 he was announced as the new head coach of the St. Louis Ambush. On July 18, 2017, Tony Glavin was removed from the head coaching position of the Ambush, though he remains a part-owner of the team.
