= Fred Grgurev =

Personal information
- Full name: Ferdo Grgurev
- Date of birth: September 14, 1951 (age 75)
- Place of birth: Zadar, PR Croatia, FPR Yugoslavia
- Position: Striker

Senior career*
Years	Team	Apps	(Gls)
1976–1977	New York Apollo		
1978	New York Cosmos	13	(0)
1978–1979	Philadelphia Fever (indoor)	24	(46)
1979–1980	Rochester Lancers	39	(6)
1979–1980	Philadelphia Fever (indoor)	31	(64)
1980–1981	New York Arrows (indoor)	37	(44)
1981–1982	New Jersey Rockets (indoor)	40	(27)
1982–1984	New York Arrows (indoor)	78	(64)
1983–1984	Memphis Americans (indoor)	20	(14)
1984–1985	Las Vegas Americans (indoor)	47	(48)
1985–1986	Pittsburgh Spirit (indoor)	37	(15)
1987	New York Express (indoor)	13	(9)

International career
1973–1976	United States	14	(1)
- * Club domestic league appearances and goals

Ferdo "Fred" Grgurev (born September 14, 1951) is a retired soccer player who played as a forward in the North American Soccer League and Major Indoor Soccer League. Born in Yugoslavia, he earned 14 caps and scored one goal for the United States national team. He is a current owner of the famed New York City steakhouse, Delmonico's.

== Professional ==
In 1976 and 1977, Grgurev played for the New York Apollo in the American Soccer League. In 1978, he joined the New York Cosmos of the North American Soccer League. In the fall of 1978, he began his indoor career with the Philadelphia Fever of the Major Indoor Soccer League. He led the league in scoring and was a First Team All Star. He was back in the NASL in 1979, this time with the Rochester Lancers. He went on to play for the Fever again during the 1979–80 indoor season and the Lancers during the 1980 outdoor season. In the fall of 1980, Grgurev joined the New York Arrows, winning the 1981 MISL title with them. He moved to the New Jersey Rockets during the offseason, but on October 2, 1982, rejoined the Arrows on a two-year contract. He began the 1983–84 season in New York before being sold to the Memphis Americans in February 1984. At the end of the season, the Americans moved to Las Vegas, Nevada to become the Las Vegas Americans. Grgurev continued playing for the Americans in their new home during the 1984–85 season. When the Americans folded in the summer of 1985, Grgurev became a free agent and signed with the Pittsburgh Spirit in September 1985. The Spirit folded at the end of the season and Grgurev did not play again until he signed with the New York Express on January 2, 1987. However, the Express also folded soon after and Grgurev retired. Grgurev was the original MISL's ninth all-time point scorer with 544. He was the league's seventh all-time goal scorer with 331. As a member of the Fever, Grgurev was Scoring Champion as well as Pass Master (ie. assists leader) in the league's inaugural season, 1978–79. It would be however his only scoring title as all-time leaguer scoring Slaviša Žungul won six of the next seven seasons'.

== National team ==
Grgurev earned fourteen caps with the United States men's national soccer team between 1973 and 1976. He scored against Canada in a friendly played in Windsor on May 8, 1973, which the Americans won 2–0.

== Awards ==
- MISL Top Goalscorer 1978-79 (46)
- MISL Scoring Champion 1978-79 (74)
- MISL Pass Master (most assists) 1978–79
- MISL All-Star Team 1978-79
