= Terry Brown (soccer) =

American soccer player (born 1964)

Personal information
- Date of birth: March 15, 1964 (age 62)
- Place of birth: St. Louis, Missouri, U.S.
- Height: 5 ft 9 in (1.75 m)
- Positions: Forward; midfielder

College career
Years	Team	Apps	(Gls)
1983–1984	Florissant Valley Archers		
1986	UMSL Tritons		

Senior career*
Years	Team	Apps	(Gls)
1986	St. Louis Kutis		
1989–1992	St. Louis Storm (indoor)	132	(36)
1992–1994	St. Louis Ambush (indoor)	60	(31)
1995–1996	Cincinnati Silverbacks (indoor)	31	(12)
Total		223	(79)
- * Club domestic league appearances and goals

Terry Brown (born March 15, 1964) is an American retired soccer player who played professionally in the Major Indoor Soccer League and National Professional Soccer League. He was the 1990 MISL Rookie of the Year and was a member of the St. Louis Kutis team which won the 1986 National Challenge Cup.

== Biography ==
Brown graduated from Cleveland High School in South St. Louis. He attended St. Louis Community College-Florissant Valley for two seasons before transferring to St. Louis University. Although he saw time in several pre-season games, he decided to drop out of college for a year due to the birth of a son. During this time, Brown played for the St. Louis Kutis team which won the 1986 National Challenge Cup. In 1986, he entered the University of Missouri–St. Louis where he played a single season on the men's soccer team. In 1987, the Cleveland Force selected Brown in the first round (eighth overall) of the Major Indoor Soccer League College Draft. When the Force offered him a developmental contract, Brown declined and worked for a year in an art gallery in Los Angeles. In the late summer of 1989, the St. Louis Storm invited Brown to its pre-season mini-camp. In October 1989, the Storm signed him to a contract. He became a regular starter after injuries depleted the roster. In the end, he was named the 1990 MISL Rookie of the Year. When the Storm folded in 1992, the National Professional Soccer League awarded a franchise to the St. Louis Ambush. Brown signed with the Ambush in the late summer of 1992. In February 1996, he joined the Cincinnati Silverbacks.
