= Carl Rose (soccer) =

Canadian soccer player

Personal information
- Date of birth: 25 November 1952 (age 73)
- Place of birth: London, England
- Height: 5 ft 9 in (1.75 m)

Senior career*
| Years | Team | Apps | (Gls) |
- Toronto Emerald
| 1978–79 | New York Arrows (indoor) | 22 | (4) |
| 1979–86 | St. Louis Steamers (indoor) | 275 | (48) |

International career
| 1976 | Canada Olympics | 1 | (0) |
- * Club domestic league appearances and goals

Carl Rose (born 25 November 1952) is a Canadian former soccer player who competed at the 1976 Summer Olympics. He also was a member of the Canadian squad at the 1975 Pan American Games.
