= Slobo Ilijevski =

Yugoslav and Macedonian footballer (1949–2008)

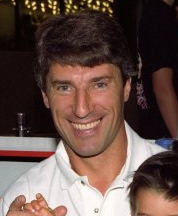

Personal information
- Full name: Slobodan Ilijevski; Слободан Илијевски
- Date of birth: October 24, 1949
- Place of birth: Skopje, FPR Yugoslavia
- Date of death: July 14, 2008 (aged 58)
- Place of death: Bellingham, Washington, United States
- Height: 6 ft 0 in (1.83 m)
- Position: Goalkeeper

Senior career*
Years	Team	Apps	(Gls)
1978–1979	Detroit Express	3	(0)
1980	Atlanta Chiefs	3	(0)
1980–1988	St. Louis Steamers (indoor)	309	(0)
1988–1989	Baltimore Blast (indoor)	23	(0)
1989–1992	St. Louis Storm (indoor)	59	(0)
1992–1993	St. Louis Ambush (indoor)	12	
- St. Louis Kutis
- * Club domestic league appearances and goals

Slobodan "Slobo" Ilijevski (Macedonian: Слободан Илијевски Слобо; October 24, 1949 in Skopje, Yugoslavia – July 14, 2008 in Bellingham, Washington) was a Yugoslav and Macedonian football (soccer) goalkeeper who played in the North American Soccer League and Major Indoor Soccer League.

== Club career ==
In 1977, Ilijevski moved to the United States and settled with extended family (Duško Krstovski/Detroit Vardar SC) in Detroit, Michigan. In 1978, he signed with the Detroit Express of the North American Soccer League. After two seasons with the Express, Ilijevski moved to the Atlanta Chiefs for one season before moving to the indoor game with the St. Louis Steamers of the Major Indoor Soccer League in the fall of 1980. He would spend the rest of his professional career playing indoor soccer. He played seven seasons with the Steamers and was named the 1982 and 1984 MISL Goalkeeper of the Year. The Steamers folded after the 1987–1988 season and Ilijevski moved to the Baltimore Blast for one season before returning to St. Louis to sign with the St. Louis Storm in August 1989. In 1992, he moved to the St. Louis Ambush of the National Professional Soccer League. After his retirement from professional soccer, Ilijevski continued to play amateur soccer with St. Louis Kutis S.C.

== Personal life ==
In December 1990, Ilijevski became an American citizen.

=== Death ===
On July 13, 2008, Ilijevski ruptured his aorta while playing goalkeeper for St. Louis Kutis in a game in Seattle, Washington. He died after thirteen hours of surgery. On March 12, 2014, it was announced that he would be a 2014 inductee into the Indoor Soccer Hall of Fame.
