= Pat Ercoli =

Canadian soccer player

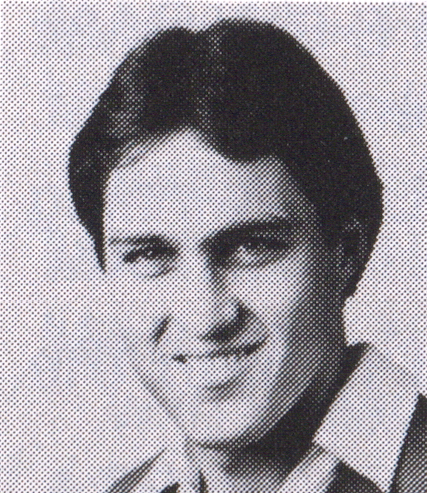
- Ercoli circa 1984

Personal information
- Date of birth: 30 November 1957 (age 68)
- Place of birth: Toronto, Ontario, Canada
- Position: Striker

Senior career*
Years	Team	Apps	(Gls)
1976	Toronto Metros-Croatia	0	(0)
1976	Toronto Italia		
1977	Montreal Castors		
1978–1980	Rochester Lancers	83	(16)
1978–1979	New York Arrows (indoor)	21	(18)
1979–1980	Detroit Lightning (indoor)	32	(44)
1981	Jacksonville Tea Men	20	(1)
1981	Toronto Italia		
1981–1982	Buffalo Stallions (indoor)	38	(32)
1982–1985	Baltimore Blast (indoor)	170	(112)
1985–1986	Cleveland Force (indoor)	29	(6)

International career
1980	Canada	1	(0)

Managerial career
- 1996–2004: Rochester Rhinos
- 2013: Rochester Rhinos
- * Club domestic league appearances and goals

Pat Ercoli (born 30 November 1957) is a Canadian former professional soccer player who works as President of the Rochester New York FC.

== Career ==
Ercoli played club football for the Rochester Lancers and the Jacksonville Tea Men in the North American Soccer League. In 1976, he played in the National Soccer League with Toronto Italia, and the following season with Montreal Castors. In August 1981, he returned to play with former team Toronto Italia. He played for the Cleveland Force of the Major Indoor Soccer League from 1985 to 1986.

== International career ==
Ercoli earned one cap for the national team in 1980.

== Coaching career ==
After retiring as a player, Ercoli coached the Rochester Rhinos from 1996 to 2004. On 29 October 2009 he returned to Rochester Rhinos and was appointed as the general manager. In 2011, he took on the additional title of president. Following a 1-6-1 start to the Rhinos' 2013 season, on 19 May Ercoli was named head coach, replacing Jesse Myers.
