= György Tóth =

Hungarian footballer

Personal information
- Date of birth: 24 April 1915
- Place of birth: Szeged, Hungary
- Date of death: 27 September 1994 (aged 79)
- Place of death: Budapest, Hungary
- Height: 1.75 m (5 ft 9 in)
- Position: Goalkeeper

Senior career*
Years	Team	Apps	(Gls)
1933–1937	Salgótarjáni SE		
1937–1942	Szeged FC		
1942–1945	Gamma FC		
1945–1948	Újpest FC		
1948–1949	MTK		

International career
1939–1948	Hungary	15	(0)

Managerial career
- –1970: Mali
- * Club domestic league appearances and goals

György Tóth (24 April 1915 – 27 September 1994) was a former Hungarian footballer who played for Salgótarjáni SE, Szeged FC, Gamma FC, Újpest FC and MTK as a goalkeeper.

He coached the Mali national football team.

== Personal life ==
He's father of former goalkeeper Zoltán Tóth and grandfather of the United States men's national beach soccer team goalkeeper Chris Toth.
