= David McWilliams =

David McWilliams may refer to:

- David McWilliams (American football) (born 1942), American football coach at the University of Texas and Texas Tech
- David McWilliams (economist) (born 1966), Irish broadcaster and commentator
- David McWilliams (musician) (1945–2002), best known for his song "Days of Pearly Spencer"
- Dave MacWilliams (born 1957), soccer coach
