= László Harsányi =

Hungarian footballer (born 1951)

Personal information
- Full name: László Harsányi
- Date of birth: August 10, 1951 (age 75)
- Place of birth: Újpest, Budapest, Hungary
- Height: 1.91 m (6 ft 3 in)
- Position: Centre-back

Youth career
- 1964–1967: Vasas Izzó
- 1968–1971: Újpesti Dózsa

Senior career*
Years	Team	Apps	(Gls)
1971–1975	Újpesti Dózsa	100	(4)
1976–1978	Westfalia Herne	35	(2)
1978–1979	San Diego Sockers	56	(2)
1978	→ New York Cosmos (loan)	0	(0)
1980	Rochester Lancers	29	(9)
1981–1982	Cercle Brugge	14	(0)

International career
1968–1969	Hungary U19		(0)
1973–1974	Hungary U23	3	(0)
Medal record
Men's football
Representing Hungary
UEFA Under-23 Championship
Gold medal – first place	1974	Team
- * Club domestic league appearances and goals

László Harsányi (born August 10, 1951) is a retired Hungarian footballer. He played as a centre-back for various clubs in different national leagues throughout the 1970s. He is most known for his careers with Újpesti Dózsa in his native Hungary and the San Diego Sockers in the United States. He also represented Hungary internationally on three occasions during the 1974 UEFA European Under-23 Championship.

== Club career ==
Growing up in Újpest, alongside his father, he was a fan of Újpesti Dózsa as well as several players of the 1950s and 1960s including János Göröcs and Ferenc Bene. He began his football career in the youth sector of Vasas Izzó as he became a recognized player by the age of 13 before switching to play for Újpesti Dózsa in 1968 and would win with them the national youth championship later that year. He made his debut in the top flight of Hungarian footballer in the second half of the 1971–72 Nemzeti Bajnokság I. By 1975, he had won four consecutive championship titles and the 1974–75 Magyar Kupa with the Újpest team, playing alongside other club icons such as László Fazekas, Ede Dunai and Ferenc Bene. In October 1975, Újpesti Dózsa played their away match against FC Zürich in the 1975–76 European Cup. Taking advantage of this opportunity, he and his teammate and friend József Horváth sought political asylum in Switzerland. The club would later make the second round of the tournament although were later defeated by Benfica.

After his one-year ban, he was signed by Westfalia Herne within the 2. Bundesliga as he played for the club for two seasons. Despite receiving offers to play in Switzerland, he travelled abroad to play in the United States between 1978 and 1981. He played for the San Diego Sockers in 1978–79, on loan to the Cosmos in 1978 and for the Rochester Lancers in 1980. He was signed for a tour with the Cosmos, where his teammates included Carlos Alberto Torres, Franz Beckenbauer, and Giorgio Chinaglia with Beckenbauer himself bidding farewell to Harsányi when his tenure with the club expired. In the meantime, he also played for the New York Arrows in 1979–80 and the Baltimore Blast in the 1980–81 season. He ended his active football career with the Belgian team Cercle Brugge in 1981–82.

== International career ==
Harsányi was a member of Hungary U-19 in 1968–69 before later making an appearance for the then a member of the youth national team nine times between 1972 and 1974. He appeared for the national team three times in 1973–74 as he played in the 1974 UEFA European Under-23 Championship as he was a part of the winning squad for the tournament including the final.

== Personal life ==
He lived in Zurich for thirty years where he worked as a taxi driver. He would also meet his current wife there as the two would regularly visit his native Hungary. In 2016, he and his wife moved back home permanently and live in Siófok, often fishing by Lake Balaton.
