= Paul Toomey =

American soccer player

Personal information
- Date of birth: June 28, 1955 (age 71)
- Place of birth: New London, Connecticut, United States
- Height: 6 ft 0 in (1.83 m)
- Position: Defender

College career
Years	Team	Apps	(Gls)
1975–1978	Penn Quakers		

Senior career*
Years	Team	Apps	(Gls)
1979	Portland Timbers	8	(0)
1979–1981	Hartford Hellions (indoor)	57	(7)
1980	→ San Jose Earthquakes (loan)	17	(0)
1981	New England Sharks		
1981–1984	Pittsburgh Spirit (indoor)	117	(10)
- * Club domestic league appearances and goals

Paul Toomey is a retired American soccer defender who played professionally in the North American Soccer League, American Soccer League and the Major Indoor Soccer League.

Toomey graduated from Coventry High School. He attended the University of Pennsylvania where he was a 1976 Honorable Mention (third team) and 1977 Second Team All-American soccer player. In 1978, the Portland Timbers selected Toomey in the first round of the North American Soccer League draft. He played eight games for the Timbers in 1979. In the fall of 1979, he signed with the Hartford Hellions of the Major Indoor Soccer League. He would play two indoor winter seasons with the Hellions. In 1980, the Hellions loaned Toomey to the San Jose Earthquakes for the 1980 NASL season. In 1981, he played for the New England Sharks of the American Soccer League. In the fall of 1981, he joined the Pittsburgh Spirit of MISL. In the summer of 1983, he had knee surgery. Complications from the surgery limited him to twelve games with the Spirit during the 1983–1984 season and his eventual retirement.
