= David D'Errico =

American soccer player (born 1952)

David D’Errico
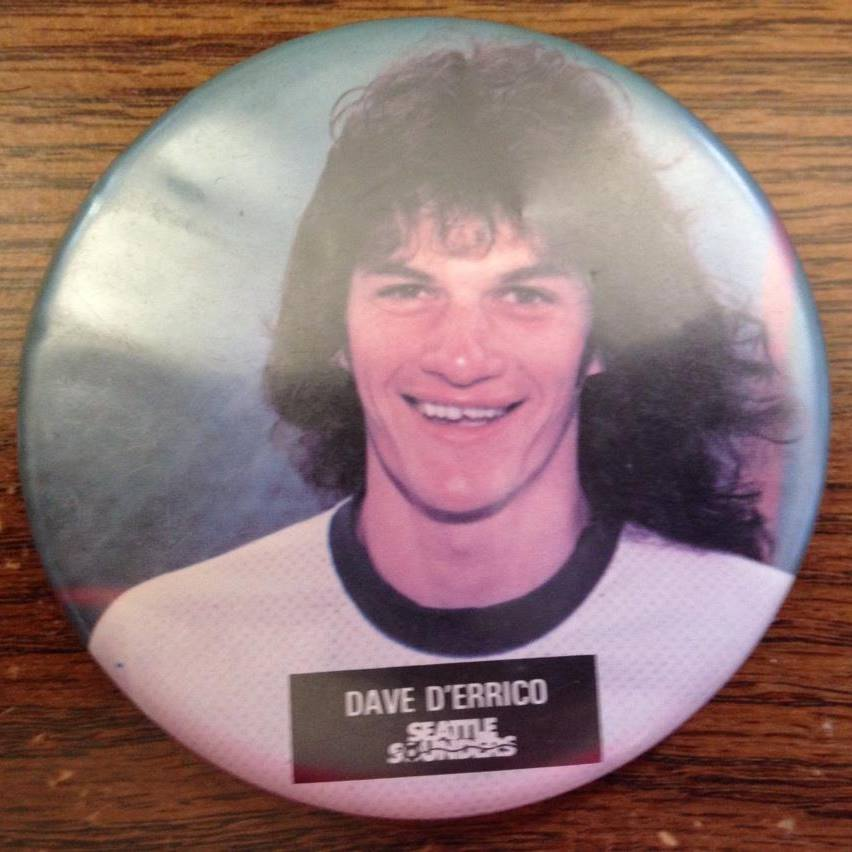
- A photo of D'Errico on a Seattle Sounders pin

Personal information
- Date of birth: June 3, 1952 (age 74)
- Place of birth: Newark, New Jersey, United States
- Height: 5 ft 10 in (1.78 m)
- Position: Defender

Youth career
- 1972–1973: Hartwick College

Senior career*
Years	Team	Apps	(Gls)
1974–1976	Seattle Sounders	37	(1)
1974	→ Dundalk (loan)	4	(0)
1977	Minnesota Kicks	22	(0)
1978	New England Tea Men	24	(0)
1978–1979	Cincinnati Kids (indoor)	20	(4)
1979	Rochester Lancers	23	(1)
1979–1982	New York Arrows (indoor)	92	(5)
1980	San Diego Sockers (indoor)	17	(0)
1984	Charlotte Gold		

International career
1974–1977	United States	21	(0)

Managerial career
- 1984: Charlotte Gold
- * Club domestic league appearances and goals

David D'Errico (born June 3, 1952) is an American soccer player who played as a defender. He spent eight years in the North American Soccer League (NASL), five in Major Indoor Soccer League (MISL) and one in the United Soccer League (USL). He won three MISL championships with the NY Arrows and earned 21 caps with the United States national team between 1974 and 1977, also captaining the team.

== Youth and college ==
Born in Newark, New Jersey, D'Errico grew up playing soccer in nearby Harrison with his three older brothers (Michael, Anthony and Thomas). Throughout his youth, he played for the local Kearny Scots. David was voted the MVP of the State of New Jersey and graduated from New Jersey's Harrison High School in 1969. In 1999, he was named by The Star-Ledger as one of the top ten New Jersey high school soccer players of the 1940s–1960s.

In 1970–72, David was an All-American at Mitchell College and earned an AA. In 1972, he entered Hartwick College where he played on the men's soccer team for the 1972 and 1973 seasons. He was a First-Team All-American in 1973, the year that Hartwick went to the NCAA tournament quarterfinals before losing to Brown University in double overtime. David D'Errico graduated from Hartwick in 1974 with a bachelor's degree in history having played twenty-seven games, scored six goals and assisted on six others.

== NASL ==
In 1974, the expansion team Seattle Sounders selected David D'Errico as their first overall pick in the NASL College Draft, making him "The Original Seattle Sounder." He was loaned to the League of Ireland First Division club, Dundalk in the 1974–1975 NASL offseason. After spending three seasons in Seattle, David broke his fibula in 2 places and tore ligaments during practice. David fully recovered.

David played with Sounder's greats, Geoff Hurst, Harry Redknapp, and under assistant coach Jimmy Gabriel.

At the time, D'Errico and Mike England were competing for the starting position. After a contract dispute, David asked to be traded to the Minnesota Kicks. He spent only a single season in Minnesota before moving to the New England Tea Men for the 1978 season. In 1978, he was named as an NASL Honorable Mention All-Star.

== MISL and NASL ==
At the end of the 1978 season, David began alternating between the outdoor NASL and the indoor Major Indoor Soccer League (MISL). In 1978, he joined the Cincinnati Kids for its one season in the newly established MISL. The Kids played the first MISL game, against the New York Arrows. That year the Kids made the playoffs only to lose to the Arrows in the semifinals.

In 1979, David played for the Rochester Lancers of the NASL. Once again he played only a single season with the Lancers, but his time with the team was significant in that the Lancers also entered the MISL as the New York Arrows. D'Errico was a second-team All-Star for the 1979–1980 MISL season and a first-team All-Star for the 1980–1981 MISL season.

The NY Arrows won 4 MISL Championships. David, his NY Arrows teammates, some of the best indoor players of all time, Steve Zungal,(The Lord of All Indoors), Branko, (The Laser), Segota, Shep Messing, Zoltán Tóth, Luis Alberto, Fred Grgurev, Doc Lawson, won 3 of 4 of the first Major Indoor Soccer League Championships.

David was the 1st player to score a short-handed goal with 2 men down in a MISL NY Arrows game and was the first player to have his number retired by the 4 Time MISL Champions.

David played one more season in the NASL, this time with the San Diego Sockers in 1980. The Sockers were a team, much like the Lancers/Arrows, a solid outdoors team, but came to dominate the indoor league.

== USL ==
David was a player-coach for the Charlotte Gold in 1984. The Gold were a team in the United Soccer League, which only lasted for the 1984 and part of the 1985 season. Under David's leadership, the team achieved an 11–13 record. Unfortunately, the Gold folded at the end of the season.

== National team ==
The National Team went on tour to play South American teams, Universitaria of Ecuador, Millonarios of Colombia, and Alianza of Peru.

In 1978, in the return leg, The National Team was coached by the American and Philadelphia native Walt Chyzowych at The Festival of the Americas, a round-robin tournament was held at Downing Stadium at Randall's Island, New York, pitting the US National Team against Universitaria of Ecuador, Millonarios of Colombia, and Alianza of Peru.

The Americans included David D'Errico, Bobby Smith, Al Trost, Arnie Mausser, Boris Bandov, Greg Villa, Gary Etherington, Tony Donlic and Ricky Davis.

The US team shut out Universitaria 3–0 and Millonarios 3–0, and beat Alianza 2–1 to win the tournament. The US outscored their opponents 8–1. Although their skills were rudimentary, the Americans showed a promising practicality, particularly among the aggressive forwards, traditionally a weak spot, given the NASL's lack of opportunity for US strikers. Americans were generally relegated to defense and goalkeeping.

The US then went on to play five games in Central America, losing two to Guatemala, being shut out by Mexico 3–0 and splitting a pair with El Salvador.

The US team finished with a three-game series against China, David D'Errico, Captained The USMNT against China, a tie, 1–1 in Washington, winning 2–1 in San Francisco and 1–0 in Atlanta.

David D'Errico also made his debut for the U.S. national team in 1974, playing the team's only two games of that year, both losses to Mexico. In 1975, he played two of the team's five games, one as a sub. However, in 1976, he became an integral member of the team and its eventual Captain as it began qualifications for the 1978 FIFA World Cup. He continued to play through the end of 1977 and experienced the disappointment of failing to qualify for the World Cup finals in 1978 in Argentina.

David has a graduate degree from Seattle Pacific University in sports psychology and sociology.

In 1995, Hartwick College inducted David D'Errico into its Athletic Hall of Fame.

== Personal life ==
David D'Errico has two sons, Aaron and Adam D’Errico.

== Movies ==
David D'Errico starred as himself in the 2021 NASL professional soccer documentary, Big-Time Soccer: The Remarkable Rise & Fall of the NASL.
