= Sepp Gantenhammer =

American soccer player

Personal information
- Date of birth: April 15, 1956 (age 70)
- Place of birth: Queens, New York, United States
- Position: Goalkeeper

Youth career
- 1975–1977: Long Island University

Senior career*
| Years | Team | Apps | (Gls) |
| 1978 | Washington Diplomats (indoor) | 1 | (0) |
| 1978–1979 | Pittsburgh Spirit (indoor) | 7 | (0) |
| 1979 | New Jersey Americans | | |
| 1979–1980 | Houston Summit (indoor) | 14 | (0) |
| 1980–1982 | Baltimore Blast (indoor) | 53 | (0) |
| 1983–1984 | Memphis Americans (indoor) | 1 | (0) |
| 1984–1985 | Columbus Capitals (indoor) | 10 | (0) |
- * Club domestic league appearances and goals

Joseph "Sepp" Gantenhammer is a retired American soccer goalkeeper who played professionally in the Major Indoor Soccer League and the American Indoor Soccer Association.

While still regularly known as "Joe" at the time, Gantenhammer played collegiately at Long Island University. He was taken early in the second round of the North American Soccer League draft with the 33rd overall pick by the Washington Diplomats. He played part of one indoor match for the Dips on February 12, 1978, making 13 saves in a 12–4 loss to Dallas. Gantenhammer did not make the Washington roster for the outdoor season, and instead settled in with the Pittsburgh Spirit of the Major Indoor Soccer League. In 1979, he moved to the Houston Summit. He was named the 1980 MISL Goalkeeper of the Year. In 1980, he moved to the Baltimore Blast for two seasons before spending the 1983–1984 season with the Memphis Americans. He played the 1984–1985 season with the Columbus Capitals in the American Indoor Soccer Association. After retiring from playing professionally, Gantenhammer played for the Pan American Airlines Soccer Club. He currently plays for the Las Vegas United Stars.

== Yearly Awards ==
- MISL Goalkeeper of the Year: 1979–1980
