= Shep Messing =

American soccer player and broadcaster (born 1949)

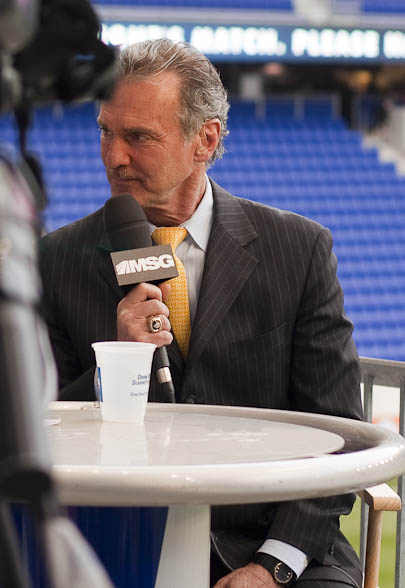
- Messing during an MSG broadcast of a New York Red Bulls game.

Personal information
- Full name: Shep Norman Messing
- Date of birth: October 9, 1949 (age 77)
- Place of birth: Bronx, New York, United States
- Height: 6 ft 0 in (1.83 m)
- Position: Goalkeeper

College career
Years	Team	Apps	(Gls)
1968–1969	NYU Violets		
1970–1971	Harvard Crimson		

Senior career*
Years	Team	Apps	(Gls)
1973–1974	New York Cosmos	9	(0)
1975–1976	Boston Minutemen	27	(0)
1976–1977	New York Cosmos	30	(0)
1978	Oakland Stompers	25	(0)
1979	Rochester Lancers	29	(0)
1978–1984	New York Arrows (indoor)	163	(0)
1984	New York Cosmos (indoor)	3	(0)
1984–1985	Pittsburgh Spirit (indoor)	3	(0)
1986–1987	New York Express (indoor)	13	(0)

International career
1971–1972	United States	1	(0)

Managerial career
- 1978: Oakland Stompers
- 1983: New York Arrows (interim)
- * Club domestic league appearances and goals

Shep Norman Messing (born October 9, 1949) is an American retired soccer goalkeeper and current broadcaster who works as a studio analyst for the MLS Season Pass team. In 2021, he took the position of chairman of the Major Arena Soccer League.

He played seven seasons in the North American Soccer League and six in the Major Indoor Soccer League. He was also a member of the United States national team at the 1971 Pan American Games and 1972 Summer Olympics. He previously worked for MSG Network in its coverage of the New York Red Bulls.

== Early life ==
Messing was born in The Bronx, New York City, grew up in Roslyn, New York, and is Jewish. His mother, the daughter of a Russian furniture maker and his Latvian wife, taught physical education at Nassau Community College, his father was a lawyer who worked in Manhattan, and his paternal grandfather was from Riga, Latvia.

Messing, along with his brother Roy, attended high school at The Wheatley School in Old Westbury, New York.

== Playing career ==
=== High school and college ===
Messing attended Wheatley High School, where he started playing soccer. He graduated from Harvard University in 1972 after playing on the school's men's soccer team. He was a two-time second team All-American.

=== National and Olympic teams ===
He joined the U.S. national team that played in the 1971 Pan American Games in Cali, Colombia.

He went on to play with the U.S. team at 1972 Summer Olympics in Munich. The U.S. went 0-2-1 in group play and failed to qualify for the second round. Messing manned the net in the U.S.'s third game of the games, a 7–0 loss to West Germany. The Munich massacre took place 30 yd (27 m) from his room. Messing was protected along with 12 other Jewish members of the US Olympic delegation. He said: "It really forged a greater Jewish identity for myself at that moment than I ever had before... That was a turning point in my life as an athlete – and as a Jew. Words really can't describe it.... two German soldiers there with machine guys, saying come with them.... We have to get the athletes to safety. Then I realized that they were rounding up the Jewish athletes."

After the Olympics, Messing received offers from teams in Mexico and Germany, but was invited to play for the New York Cosmos of the North American Soccer League (NASL), where his teammates would eventually include Pelé, Franz Beckenbauer and Giorgio Chinaglia.

=== NASL ===
He made his debut with the Cosmos in a May 20, 1974 exhibition game with Irish club Finn Harps.

Messing attracted attention by posing in the nude for a photo spread in the December 1974 issue of Viva magazine, for which he was paid $5,000 ($33,000 in current dollar terms). He joked that these photos gave the New York Cosmos more "exposure" than they'd ever received from the media up to that time. The Cosmos management was not pleased, and cut Messing from the team on the grounds that he had violated a morals clause in his contract.

He moved to the Boston Minutemen for a season and a half and led the league in goalkeeping with a 1.24 GAA. Halfway through the 1976 season, Boston owner John Sterge began selling his players when he began to fear he would go bankrupt. The Minutemen sold Messing to the Cosmos who needed him after starter Bob Rigby was injured. Messing then played the 1977 season with the Cosmos before moving to the Oakland Stompers. When he signed with the Stompers for $100,000 ($494,000 in current dollar terms) per year, he became the highest-paid American in the NASL. The Stompers lasted only a single season, following which Messing moved to the Rochester Lancers.

=== MISL ===
When the Major Indoor Soccer League began its first season in 1978–1979, the New York Arrows were essentially the Rochester Lancers in different uniforms. As such, Messing became the starting Arrows goalkeeper through the team's six years of existence. Messing became the league's dominant keeper, being named to the MISL All Star team in 1979, 1980 and 1981. He was the championship MVP in 1979.

When the Arrows fired coach Don Popovic in February 1983, the team named Messing, who was sidelined with an injury, as the interim coach. After his retirement, Messing was briefly part-owner of the ill-fated New York Express, which played the first half of the 1986-1987 MISL season before folding.

== Awards and honors ==
=== Club ===
New York Cosmos

- Soccer Bowl (1): 1977

New York Arrows

- Major Indoor Soccer League Championship (4): 1978–79, 1979–80, 1980–81, 1981–82

=== Individual ===
- Major Indoor Soccer League Championship MVP (1): 1978–79
- First Team All MISL (2): 1978–79, 1979–80
- New York Sports Hall of Fame
- National Jewish Sports Hall of Fame
- Nassau County Sports Hall of Fame

== Legal issues ==
In October 1990, Messing was indicted alongside two others on 38 charges including wire fraud, using interstate facilities to transport stolen money, and using interstate facilities to commit commercial bribery. The charges related to a phony investment scheme that scammed $500,000 from a number of professional athletes. The other two charged were sports agent Harvey LaKind and broker Bruce Black, the latter Messing worked with at brokerage firm Woodmere Securities.

Between 1987–1989, the trio convinced athletes (including basketballer players Darryl Dawkins, Kim Hughes and Al Skinner) to give money to LaKind for safe investments. Instead, the money was transferred out into their own accounts for personal use. Messing later claimed in a 2013 interview that Black was the ringleader and disappeared with the money – however, prosecutor Andrew Maloney alleged that LaKind used a portion of his share to buy a new Mercedes-Benz and to pay for his daughter's wedding.

Five years later in 1995, Messing pled guilty to Federal Wire Fraud and received five years probation, a $2,000 fine, and was barred from working in the securities industry. The ordeal caused him to file for Chapter 11 bankruptcy the same year, confirmed in 1998. It also led to his return to the football from the brokerage world, creating a player agency and returning to sports broadcasting.

== Broadcaster ==
Messing has been a soccer broadcaster for sixteen years. He began as an analyst for the Major Indoor Soccer League games on ESPN. He broadcast the 1986 FIFA World Cup from Mexico, the 2002 FIFA World Cup from South Korea/Japan and the 2006 FIFA World Cup in Germany for ESPN. He has also been the main analyst for the MetroStars and the re-branded New York Red Bulls of Major League Soccer, working both on radio and television since 2001. He served as a color commentator for ESPN Radio covering the 2014 FIFA World Cup.

Despite his role as a broadcaster/analyst for MLS and other soccer matches, he was the player agent for U.S. under-20 and former D.C. United midfielder Danny Szetela through Global Sports Group. This has led some, including Washington Post soccer reporter Steven Goff, to question his objectivity in his work as an analyst.

He is a member of the New York Sports Hall of Fame and the National Jewish Sports Hall of Fame and the author of a book on soccer, while appearing in several films on the sport.

In 2006, he was inducted into the Nassau County Sports Hall of Fame. Messing has been the color analyst for Madison Square Garden for twelve years broadcasting the New York Red Bulls games in Major League Soccer. He has also been the color analyst for the 2002, 2006 and 2010 FIFA World Cups for ESPN.

Messing served as an analyst for NBC Sports coverage of soccer at the 2008 and 2012 Summer Olympics.

In 2023, Messing was named a studio analyst for the MLS Season Pass coverage team as all MLS coverage moved to a streaming service.

== Autobiography ==
Messing wrote an autobiography entitled The Education of an American Soccer Player which was published in hardcover in 1978 by Dodd, Mead and in paperback in 1979 by Bantam Books.

== Other media appearances ==
Messing appeared nude as a centerfold in a 1974 issue of Viva magazine..

== See also ==
- List of select Jewish football (association; soccer) players
