= Steve Pecher =

American soccer player-coach

Personal information
- Date of birth: February 13, 1956 (age 70)
- Place of birth: St. Louis, Missouri, United States
- Height: 6 ft 0 in (1.83 m)
- Position: Defender

Youth career
- 1975–1976: Florissant Valley Community College

Senior career*
Years	Team	Apps	(Gls)
1976–1980	Dallas Tornado	139	(7)
1979–1984	St. Louis Steamers (indoor)	152	(39)
1984–1985	Kansas City Comets (indoor)	54	(6)
1985–1987	St. Louis Steamers (indoor)	58	(14)
1987–1988	Los Angeles Lazers (indoor)	45	(3)

International career
1976–1980	United States	17	(0)
- * Club domestic league appearances and goals

Steve Pecher (born St. Louis, Missouri) is an American former soccer defender who is currently the President of St Louis Scott Gallagher.

== Youth and college ==
Pecher began playing soccer with the youth club, Florissant Cougars, then with his high school team at Normandy High School in St. Louis. He was part of the team which took the Missouri state championship in 1974, his senior year. He was also All State both his junior and senior years. The next year attended Florissant Valley Community College where he played on the national junior college championship team in 1975. He was a junior college All American both years at Florissant.

== Professional ==
In 1976, the Dallas Tornado of the North American Soccer League (NASL) signed Pecher. That season he was named the 1976 NASL Rookie of the Year. He remained with the club through the 1980 season. By 1980, Pecher had begun a transition to indoor soccer when he joined the St. Louis Steamers of Major Indoor Soccer League (MISL) for the 1979–1980 season. He was a 1980 MISL All Star with the Steamers. He remained with the Steamers through the 1983–1984 season. Pecher became a free agent in August 1984 and on September 11, 1984, he signed with the Kansas City Comets. He began the 1985–1986 season in Kansas City, but the Comets traded him to the Steamers for Stuart Lee in December 1985. He would remain with the Steamers until they traded him and Don Ebert on February 20, 1987, to the Los Angeles Lazers in exchange for Poli Garcia and Jim Kavanaugh. He retired at the end of the 1987–1988 season.

== National team ==
Pecher earned 17 caps with the U.S. national team from 1976 to 1980. He made his first appearance with the national team in a September 24, 1976, 1–1 tie with Canada in Vancouver where he received a red card. He received another red card in 0–3 loss to Canada in Port-au-Prince on December 22, 1976. He played his last game with the U.S. national team in a November 9, 1980 1–5 loss to Mexico in Mexico City and was U.S. captain from 1978 to 1980.

== Post-playing career ==
After retiring from playing, Pecher joined Marriott, where he became the director of retail sales. In September 2002, he was hired as the director of the former Busch Soccer Club then St. Louis Soccer Club and now the St. Louis Scott Gallagher. He had spent time with the team as a coach and continues to coach the younger girls teams.
