= Phoenix Inferno =

Former American indoor soccer team

The Phoenix Inferno was an American indoor soccer team in Phoenix, Arizona, that played in the Major Indoor Soccer League from 1980 to 1983. In 1983 new ownership renamed the team the Phoenix Pride. The Pride folded at the end of the 1983–1984 season. Both teams played their home games at the Arizona Veterans Memorial Coliseum.

The Phoenix Inferno, owned by Richard Ragone and later Irv Berger, entered the Major Indoor Soccer League in 1980. The Phoenix Inferno bumper stickers read "Our Balls Are Off The Wall." Original owner Ragone was killed in a December 1981 car crash. In January 1983, Berger filed for bankruptcy. The league approved the sale of the team to Bruce Merrill, chairman of American Cable Television, for $175,000.

== Year-by-year ==
Year	Record	Regular season	Playoffs	Avg. attendance
1980–1981	17–23	2nd Western Division	First Round	7,180
1981–1982	17–27	5th Western Division	Did not qualify	7,118
1982–1983	24–24	5th Western Division	Did not qualify	6,302
1983-1984	18-30	6th Western Division	Did not qualify	5,923

== Phoenix Pride ==
When Bruce Merrill purchased the Phoenix Inferno, he brought in Ted Podleski as general manager. A devout Christian, Podleski objected to the use of the word Inferno and Merrill renamed the team the Pride. On March 3, 1984, Podleski fired the head coach and installed himself as head coach despite never playing or coaching soccer before. The team finished the season at 18–30 and failed to qualify for the playoffs. Merrill put the team up for sale in June 1984. When he received no offers, he folded the team in July.
