= Philadelphia Fever (MISL) =

US indoor soccer team

Philadelphia Fever logo

The Philadelphia Fever was an indoor soccer team, based in Philadelphia, that played in the original Major Indoor Soccer League from 1978 to 1982. The team's home arena was the Spectrum.

== History ==
After being granted a one-year hiatus following the 1981-82 season, the team ultimately folded. While it is often reported that the Los Angeles Lazers were the relocated Fever, the one-year hiatus was actually granted at the same time as the Lazers were awarded an expansion franchise, during the MISL's August 1982 league meetings.

During the four seasons that the Fever played in Philadelphia, the average attendance was 5,777 per game.

== Yearly Awards ==
- 1978–1979 Season
- Fred Grgurev – MISL Top Goalscorer, MISL Scoring Champion, MISL Pass Master (most assists) & All-Star Team selection.

== Year-by-year ==
Year	Record	Regular season	Playoffs
1978–1979	11–13	4th Place	Championship Series
1979–1980	17–15	T3rd Central Division	did not qualify
1980–1981	18–22	3rd Atlantic Division	did not qualify
1981–1982	11–33	7th Eastern Division	did not qualify
