= St. Louis Storm =

Defunct soccer team in St. Louis, Missouri, U.S.

- Founded: July 13, 1989
- Dissolved: 1992
- Stadium: St. Louis Arena
- Capacity: 17,188
- Owner(s): Professional Sports Investments, Inc.
- CEO/President: Milan Mandaric
- League: Major Indoor Soccer League

The St. Louis Storm was a soccer team based out of St. Louis that played in the Major Indoor Soccer League (MISL). They played from 1989 to 1992. Their home arena was the St. Louis Arena. The mascot for the St. Louis Storm was named "Colt Flash" (1990).

== History ==
On July 13, 1989, Milan Mandaric announced the formation of the St. Louis Storm at the Missouri Athletic Club. Mandaric, a Yugoslav-born technology businessman and mechanical engineer, had previously owned the San Jose Earthquakes of the North American Soccer League from 1974 to 1978. The club began play with the 1989–90 MISL season. Don Popovic, a Yugoslav native who had spent three seasons with the St. Louis Stars during his playing career, was hired as the head coach.

Both the MISL and the Storm folded after the 1991–92 season.

== Notable players ==
A notable Storm player was Preki, the Yugoslav born winger who stayed with the club until its demise in 1992, when he signed for Everton in the new English FA Premier League. He later played for Portsmouth before returning to the US to play in the newly formed Major League Soccer in 1996, the same year that he was first selected for the United States national soccer team.

Other notable players include:

- David Brcic

== Coaches ==
- (Socialist Federal Republic of Yugoslavia) Don Popovic (1989–92)
- (United States) (Uruguay) Fernando Clavijo (1992)

== Yearly awards ==
- All-Star team selection: Fernando Clavijo (1989–90) (1990–91)
- Rookie of the Year: Terry Brown (1989–90)
- Newcomer of the Year: Claudio De Oliviera (1989–90)
- MVP: Fernando Clavijo (1989–90) (1990–91)
