= New York Arrows =

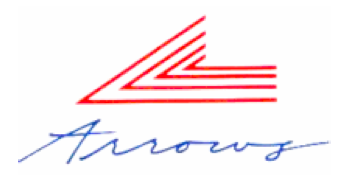
- Full name: New York Arrows
- Founded: 1978
- Dissolved: 1984
- Ground: Nassau Coliseum, Uniondale, New York
- Capacity: 16,234
- League: Major Indoor Soccer League

The New York Arrows were an indoor soccer team that played in the original Major Indoor Soccer League (MISL) from 1978 to 1984. They were the MISL's first dynasty, winning the first four championships.

== History ==
=== Preparing for the first season ===
In 1978, the New York Arrows began their first season as an indoor soccer team in the newly-established Major Indoor Soccer League (MISL). They were owned by Bernie Rodin, and John Luciani who also owned the Rochester Lancers of the North American Soccer League. While preparing for the MISL's inaugural season, the Arrows' imported nearly the entire roster of the Lancers, which played a spring-to-fall schedule.

However, the Arrows did make one significant, and crucial, addition: they signed Slaviša "Steve" Zungul, a virtually unknown Yugoslavian player. Zungul was a seasoned outdoor player from HNK Hajduk Split who had gained permission of the Yugoslavia Football Federation to play outside of his native country for a few months. In truth, he planned to defect to the West and play in the MISL for a few years before jumping to the North American Soccer League once things settled down. When it became apparent he had no intention of returning to Hajduk, the Yugoslavia Football Federation obtained a ruling from FIFA forbidding any FIFA-sanctioned outdoor team from signing him. This ruled out nearly every outdoor club in the world, and forced Zungul to stay with the non-FIFA MISL.

On December 22, 1978, the New York Arrows kicked off the first season of MISL, playing in the league's first game, at home versus the Cincinnati Kids.

=== Champions ===
The decision to import the Lancers paid off, as the Arrows finished second out of six teams. Only the Houston Summit had a better record, but it was the Arrows who took the title, defeating the Philadelphia Fever.

The Arrows dominated the league for the next three years, winning three consecutive division titles, then defending the league crown three consecutive times against the Houston Summit (1979–80) and the St. Louis Steamers (1980–81 and 1981–82).

=== Dominating players ===
While the Arrows were the class of the MISL in its early years, several Arrows players gained repeated individual recognition. In his four seasons with the Arrows, Steve Zungul, "The Lord of All Indoors", regularly scored nearly five goals per game and in one instance, scored seven in a game versus the Chicago Horizons in 1981. His scoring exploits led to his selection as League MVP four times running. He was also the four time league scoring leader and a two time assists leader. While Zungul was far and away the best player in the league, he was not the only Arrows great. Shep Messing was the first championship series MVP and a perennial all star. His replacement, Zoltan Toth, was the 1982–1983 Goalkeeper of the Year. Juli Veee was an outstanding midfielder while Branko Šegota was a perennial All Star. However, these are merely a handful of great Arrows players.

=== Decline and bankruptcy ===
Though a powerhouse on the field, the Arrows were mediocre at best at the box office. Despite four consecutive championships from 1978 to 1982 and a combined regular season record of 114-26 (.814), New York averaged only 7,049 fans for their 70 home games during their dynasty era, less than half-filling the Nassau Coliseum. Shortly after the team won its fourth and final MISL title in 1982, the team was sold. In January 1983, the team traded Steve Zungul to the San Jose Earthquakes for Gary Etherington and Gordon Hill. While billed as a move to "Americanize" the Arrows, it was largely a cost-saving device (especially since Hill was British). In the 1982-83 campaign, the Arrows could only manage a 24-24 mark, fourth place, and their first ever playoff loss, a first-round playoff exit at the hands of the Baltimore Blast. Zungul would go on to become the NASL League MVP in 1984; without him, the Arrows slipped even further in 1983-84, to 20-28, barely grabbing the last playoff spot in the East. They were eliminated in the first round by Baltimore again, with the final game (a 14-5 loss on May 9, 1984, in front of just 1,779 on Long Island) proving to be the Arrows' last contest ever. The Arrows' lease on the Coliseum expired on July 4, and a group of players looked into buying the club from owner David Schoenstadt. Instead, Schoenstadt (who also owned the MISL's Kansas City Comets) declared the Arrows bankrupt on July 19.

=== Legacy ===
After the folding of the Arrows, the MISL tried again in the New York market by luring the famed New York Cosmos to the league in 1984. However, the Cosmos dropped out of the MISL after playing only 33 games of their planned 48-game schedule, finishing with a league-worst 11-22 record. (With the NASL folding, the Cosmos tried to play an independent outdoor schedule in 1985, but finally folded for good after three lightly-attended matches at Giants Stadium.) Undaunted, the indoor circuit tried again with the New York Express in 1986, but this proved to be an even bigger disaster: the club folded in February 1987 after losing 23 of their 26 games. The MISL never succeeded in gaining a foothold in the sports-heavy New York market.

== Arena ==
Their home arena was Nassau Coliseum in Uniondale, New York.

== Management ==
- Owner – John Luciani (1978–1982)
- Owner – David Schoenstadt (1982–1984)
- General Manager – Tod Leiweke

== Coaches ==
- Dragan Popović 1978–1983
- Shep Messing 1983
- Joe Machnik

== Year-by-year ==
Year	Record	Regular season	Playoffs	Avg. attendance
1978–1979	16–8	2nd	Champions	5,446
1979–1980	27–5	1st Atlantic Division	Champions	7,813
1980–1981	35–5	1st Atlantic Division	Champions	8,083
1981–1982	36–8	1st Eastern Division	Champions	6,429
1982–1983	24–24	4th Eastern Division	1st Round	5,623
1983–1984	20–28	4th Eastern Division	1st Round	5,478

== Honors ==
MISL Championship

- 1979, 1980, 1981, 1982

League MVP

- 1978–1979 Slaviša Žungul
- 1979–1980 Slaviša Žungul
- 1980–1981 Slaviša Žungul
- 1981–1982 Slaviša Žungul

Championship MVP

- 1978–1979 Shep Messing
- 1979–1980 Slaviša Žungul
- 1980–1981 Slaviša Žungul
- 1981–1982 Slaviša Žungul

Scoring Champion

- 1979–1980 Slaviša Žungul
- 1980–1981 Slaviša Žungul
- 1981–1982 Slaviša Žungul
- 1982–1983 Slaviša Žungul

Pass Master (Assists Leader)

- 1979–1980 Slaviša Žungul
- 1981–1982 Slaviša Žungul

Defender of the Year

- 1981–1982 Veljko Tukša

Goalkeeper of the Year

- 1982–1983 Zoltan Toth

Coach of the Year

- 1980–1981 Dragan Popović

First Team All MISL

- 1978–1979: Shep Messing, Slaviša Žungul
- 1979–1980: Shep Messing, Branko Šegota, Slaviša Žungul
- 1980–1981: Shep Messing, David D'Errico, Branko Šegota, Slaviša Žungul
- 1981–1982: Veljko Tukša, Slaviša Žungul
- 1982–1983: Veljko Tukša

== Significant players ==
- (Uruguay) (United States) Fernando Clavijo
- (United States) David D'Errico
- (Croatia) (United States) Fred Grgurev
- (United States) Shep Messing
- (Liberia) (United States) Doc Lawson
- (Canada) (Socialist Federal Republic of Yugoslavia) Branko Šegota
- (Hungary) Zoltan Toth
- (Hungary) (United States) Juli Veee
- (Croatia) (Socialist Federal Republic of Yugoslavia) Slaviša Žungul
