= St. Louis Steamers (1979–1988) =

St.Louis Steamers
- Logo of the original St. Louis Steamers
- Founded: 1979
- Dissolved: 1988
- Ground: St. Louis Arena; St. Louis, Missouri
- Capacity: 18,000
- League: Major Indoor Soccer League

The original St. Louis Steamers played in the Major Indoor Soccer League from 1979 through 1988. Their home fixtures were held at the St. Louis Arena. The Steamers were popular for several years, with average attendance exceeding 12,000 for each season from 1980–81 through 1984–85, and outdrawing the NHL's St. Louis Blues for four consecutive seasons from 1980–81 through 1983–84.

== Ownership ==
- Marvin Mann (1979–1980)
- Stan Musial & Partnership (1980–83)
- Thomas M. Bowers & Partnership (1983–87)
- Bing Devine (1987–88)

== History ==
The Major Indoor Soccer League awarded St. Louis a franchise on July 31, 1979. The home opener on December 14, 1979, drew over 18,000 fans to the Arena. Part of the Steamers' attraction was that their roster was drawn in large part from local talent.

The Steamers' popularity peaked during the 1981–82 season, when the team averaged 17,107 fans per game, including 19,298 fans in the Steamers' match at the Arena against the Denver Avalanche. In 1981–82, the Steamers won their second straight division title and reached the MISL Championship finals, where they lost to New York in a five-game series.

The Steamers played their final match on April 15, 1988, in front of 4,839 fans. Following the 1987–88 season, the club folded, and the MISL terminated the Steamers' franchise.

== Year-by-year ==
League champions	Runners-Up	Division champions*	Playoff berth

Year	League	Reg. season	G.F.	G.A.	Percent	Finish	Playoffs	Attendance
1979–80	MISL I	12–20	177	184	.375		Did not qualify	14,060
1980–81	MISL I	25–15	122	196	.625	Central Division champions	Lost in MISL Finals to New York	15,219
1981–82	MISL I	28–16	128	182	.636	Central Division champions	Lost in MISL Finals to New York	17,107
1982–83	MISL I	26–22	234	234	.542		Lost in 1st round to Wichita	14,693
1983–84	MISL I	26–22	220	202	.542	Western Division champions	Lost in MISL Finals to Baltimore	13,992
1984–85	MISL I	24–24	211	207	.500		Lost in the Wild Card to Kansas City	12,711
1985–86	MISL I	23–25	223	233	.479		Lost in 1st round to San Diego	10,189
1986–87	MISL I	19–33	122	196	.365		Did not qualify	7,038
1987–88	MISL I	18–38	195	224	.321		Did not qualify	6,440

== Retired numbers ==
- #30 Slobo Ilijevski
- #7 Daryl Doran

== Coaches ==
- (United States) Pat McBride (1979–81) (1985–87)
- (United States) Al Trost (1981–83)
- (Northern Ireland) Dave Clements (1983–85)
- (Scotland) Tony Glavin (1987–88)

== Yearly Awards ==
MISL Rookie of the Year

- 1980–81 – Don Ebert

MISL Goalkeeper of the Year

- 1981–1982 – Slobo Ilijevski
- 1983–1984 – Slobo Ilijevski

MISL All-Star Team Selection

- 1980–1981 – Steve Pecher
- 1980–1981 – Tony Glavin
- 1981–1982 – Slobo Ilijevski
- 1983–1984 – Slobo Ilijevski
- 1983–1984 – Sam Bick

MISL Coach of the Year

- 1979–80 – Pat McBride (Jointly held)

== See also ==
- Soccer in St. Louis
- St. Louis Stars
- St. Louis Storm (1989–92)
- St. Louis Ambush (1992–2000)
- AC St. Louis (2010)
- Record attendances in United States club soccer
