= Major Indoor Soccer League (1978–1992) =

Indoor soccer league in the United States

- Sport: Indoor soccer
- Founded: 1977
- First season: 1978–79
- Folded: 1992; 34 years ago
- No. of teams: high of 14
- Country: United States
- Last champion: San Diego Sockers
- Most titles: San Diego Sockers (8 titles)

The Major Indoor Soccer League (MISL), known in its final two seasons as the Major Soccer League, was an indoor soccer league in the United States that played matches from fall 1978 to spring 1992.

== History ==
The MISL was founded by businessmen Ed Tepper and Earl Foreman in October 1977.

The league fielded six teams for its inaugural 1978–79 season. Before folding after 14 seasons of competition, at the conclusion of the 1991–92 season, a total of 24 franchises – under 31 team names (seven teams changed city/name) – had played in the MISL.

Over its life, MISL teams were based in 27 different cities – with two different teams, at different times, playing in Cleveland, Ohio; East Rutherford, New Jersey; St. Louis, Missouri; and Uniondale, New York.

The Houston Summit (1978–80)/Baltimore Blast (1980–92) franchise was the only one to compete for the entire 14 seasons of the MISL's existence. The next longest-lived franchise, and the longest in a single city, was the Wichita Wings team, which played for 13 seasons and missed only the inaugural 1978–79 season. The third longest-lived franchise was the Detroit Lightning (1979–80)/San Francisco Fog (1980–81)/Kansas City Comets (1981–91) franchise, which played for 12 seasons, missing only the first and last seasons.

The San Diego Sockers was the most successful franchise, winning eight of the MISL's 14 overall championships during the team's nine seasons in the league. The New York Arrows won the MISL's first four championships, then folded after the league's sixth season.

The most successful player in the MISL is arguably Steve Zungul, a Yugoslav American striker who was MISL Most Valuable Player six times, was the Scoring Champion six times, the Pass Master (most assists) four times, played on eight championship-winning teams (and one runner-up), and won Championship Series Most Valuable Player four times. Zungul is the MISL's all-time leader in goals (652, nearly 200 ahead of the second highest scorer), assists (471, nearly 100 ahead of second) and points (1,123, nearly 300 ahead of second).

Despite ongoing financial hardships, the MISL had some success. The league averaged a respectable 7,644 fans per game over its 14 regular seasons, and averaged 9,049 fans per game over its 14 playoff runs.

The league changed its name to the Major Soccer League (MSL) in 1990, and then folded in 1992. Four of the league's seven franchises continued to operate: the Cleveland Crunch and Wichita Wings joined the National Professional Soccer League while the Dallas Sidekicks and San Diego Sockers helped found the Continental Indoor Soccer League.

=== Arena football inspiration ===
The concept was initially so popular that in 1981, it helped pave the way for the creation of another indoor sports league, the Arena Football League, and subsequently the entire sport of indoor "gridiron" football. During the MISL All-Star Game at Madison Square Garden, National Football League promotions director Jim Foster sketched a design of what a football field would look like on the back of a 9x12 manila envelope. That inspiration gave birth to the concept now known as arena football (also indoor football) and the AFL was born six years later. Foster credits the MISL for the inspiration.

== Teams ==
Team	City/Area	Arena	Seasons
Baltimore Blast; Houston Summit, 1978–80	Baltimore, Maryland; Houston, Texas	Baltimore Arena; The Summit	1978–92
Buffalo Stallions	Buffalo, New York	Buffalo Memorial Auditorium	1979–84
Chicago Horizons	Rosemont, Illinois	Rosemont Horizon	1980–81
Chicago Sting	Chicago	Chicago Stadium; Rosemont Horizon	1982–83*, 1984–88
Cincinnati Kids	Cincinnati	Riverfront Coliseum	1978–79
Cleveland Crunch	Cleveland, Ohio	Richfield Coliseum	1989–92
Cleveland Force	Cleveland, Ohio	Richfield Coliseum	1978–88
Dallas Sidekicks	Dallas, Texas	Reunion Arena	1984–92
Denver Avalanche	Denver, Colorado	McNichols Sports Arena	1980–82
Golden Bay Earthquakes	Oakland, California	Oakland–Alameda County Coliseum Arena	1982–83*
Kansas City Comets; San Francisco Fog, 1980–81; Detroit Lightning, 1979–80	Kansas City, Missouri; Daly City, California; Detroit, Michigan	Kemper Arena; Cow Palace; Cobo Arena	1979–91
Las Vegas Americans; Memphis Americans, 1981–84; Hartford Hellions, 1979–81	Paradise, Nevada; Memphis, Tennessee; Hartford, Connecticut	Thomas & Mack Center; Mid-South Coliseum; New Haven Coliseum, Hartford Civic Center	1979–85
Los Angeles Lazers	Inglewood, California	The Forum	1982–89
Minnesota Strikers	Bloomington, Minnesota	Met Center	1984–88
New Jersey Rockets	East Rutherford, New Jersey	Brendan Byrne Arena	1981–82
New York Arrows	Uniondale, New York	Nassau Veterans Memorial Coliseum	1978–84
New York Express	Uniondale, New York	Nassau Veterans Memorial Coliseum	1986–87
New York Cosmos	East Rutherford, New Jersey	Brendan Byrne Arena	1984–85
Philadelphia Fever	Philadelphia, Pennsylvania	The Spectrum	1978–82
Phoenix Inferno/Pride	Phoenix, Arizona	Arizona Veterans Memorial Coliseum	1980–84
Pittsburgh Spirit	Pittsburgh, Pennsylvania	Civic Arena	1978–80, 1981–86
San Diego Sockers	San Diego, California	San Diego Sports Arena	1982–83*, 1984–92
St. Louis Steamers	St. Louis, Missouri	St. Louis Arena	1979–88
St. Louis Storm	St. Louis, Missouri	St. Louis Arena	1989–92
Tacoma Stars	Tacoma, Washington	Tacoma Dome	1983–92
Wichita Wings	Wichita, Kansas	Kansas Coliseum	1979–92

*Three North American Soccer League (NASL) teams temporarily joined the MISL for the 1982–83 season, as the NASL did not play indoors for that season. As the NASL was folding in 1985, four of its former teams (Chicago, Minnesota, New York and San Diego) joined the MISL in late 1984.

The "Denver Avalanche" had declared bankruptcy and ceased operations after the 1981–82 season, but the franchise still existed and was purchased out of bankruptcy and moved to Tacoma after a dormant season. The MISL, however, considered the Stars a new franchise and, thus, team records did not transfer to Tacoma.

In June 1987, the MISL granted a conditional franchise to NBA Denver Nuggets owner Sidney Shlenker, to commence play in the 1988–89 season. When the tentative "Denver Desperados" attracted deposits on 400 season tickets, rather than the required 5,000 within four months, the franchise was revoked in November 1987.

== Attendance ==
Year	Average	Playoffs
1978–79	4,453	4,766
1979–80	6,102	6,691
1980–81	6,839	10,740
1981–82	8,735	8,848
1982–83	7,895	11,536
1983–84	8,868	10,252
1984–85	8,696	8,511
1985–86	8,680	11,983
1986–87	8,714	12,514
1987–88	8,439	7,771
1988–89	7,765	7,557
1989–90	7,765	6,584
1990–91	6,566	7,264
1991–92	7,844	6,825
Overall	7,644	9,049

== MISL and MSL Championship Series ==
=== By year ===
Season	Champions	Series	Runners-up	MVP	Winning coach
1978–79	New York Arrows	2–0	Philadelphia Fever	Shep Messing	Don Popović
1979–80*	New York Arrows	7–4*	Houston Summit	Steve Žungul	Don Popović
1980–81*	New York Arrows	6–5*	St. Louis Steamers	Steve Žungul	Don Popović
1981–82	New York Arrows	3–2	St. Louis Steamers	Steve Žungul	Don Popović
1982–83	San Diego Sockers	3–2	Baltimore Blast	Juli Veee	Ron Newman
1983–84	Baltimore Blast	4–1	St. Louis Steamers	Scott Manning	Ken Cooper
1984–85	San Diego Sockers	4–1	Baltimore Blast	Steve Žungul	Ron Newman
1985–86	San Diego Sockers	4–3	Minnesota Strikers	Brian Quinn	Ron Newman
1986–87	Dallas Sidekicks	4–3	Tacoma Stars	Tatu	Gordon Jago
1987–88	San Diego Sockers	4–0	Cleveland Force	Hugo Pérez	Ron Newman
1988–89	San Diego Sockers	4–3	Baltimore Blast	Victor Nogueira	Ron Newman
1989–90	San Diego Sockers	4–2	Baltimore Blast	Brian Quinn	Ron Newman
1990–91	San Diego Sockers	4–2	Cleveland Crunch	Ben Collins	Ron Newman
1991–92	San Diego Sockers	4–2	Dallas Sidekicks	Thompson Usiyan	Ron Newman

*Single-game championship, game score rather than series results.

=== By club ===
Club	Winner	Runner-up	Seasons Won	Seasons Runner-Up
San Diego Sockers	8	0	1982–83, 1984–85, 1985–86, 1987–88, 1988–89, 1989–90, 1990–91, 1991–92	–
New York Arrows	4	0	1978–79, 1979–80, 1980–81, 1981–82	–
Baltimore Blast	1	5	1983–84	1979–80 (as Houston Summit), 1982–83, 1984–85, 1988–89, 1989–90
Dallas Sidekicks	1	1	1986–87	1991–92
St. Louis Steamers	0	3	–	1980–81, 1981–82, 1983–84
Philadelphia Fever	0	1	–	1978–79
Minnesota Strikers	0	1	–	1985–86
Tacoma Stars	0	1	–	1986–87
Cleveland Force	0	1	–	1987–88
Cleveland Crunch	0	1	–	1990–91

== Commissioners ==
- Earl Foreman (1978—1985)
- Francis L. Dale (1985—1986)
- Bill Kentling (1986—1989)
- Earl Foreman (1989—1992)

== All-time statistics leaders ==
=== Points ===
1. 1,123 – (Socialist Federal Republic of Yugoslavia) (United States) Steve Žungul (New York Arrows, Golden Bay Earthquakes, San Diego Sockers, Tacoma Stars)
2. 841 – (Canada) (Croatia) Branko Šegota (New York Arrows, San Diego Sockers, St.Louis Storm)
3. 690 – (Brazil) Tatu (Dallas Sidekicks)
4. 686 – (Canada) Dale Mitchell (Tacoma Stars, Kansas City Comets, Baltimore Blast)
5. 683 – (Finland) Kai Haaskivi (Houston Summit, Cleveland Force, Baltimore Blast, Cleveland Crunch)
6. 682 – (Netherlands) Jan Goossens (Golden Bay Earthquakes, Minnesota Strikers, Kansas City Comets, Dallas Sidekicks)
7. 664 – (United States) (Socialist Federal Republic of Yugoslavia) Preki (Tacoma Stars, St. Louis Storm)
8. 612 – (Ecuador) Chico Borja (Las Vegas Americans, Wichita Wings, Los Angeles Lazers)
9. 544 – (United States) (Croatia) Fred Grgurev (Philadelphia Fever, New York Arrows, New Jersey Rockets, Memphis/Las Vegas Americans, Pittsburgh Spirit, New York Express)
10. 542 – (Socialist Federal Republic of Yugoslavia) (United States) Stan Stamenković (Memphis Americans, Baltimore Blast)

=== Goals ===
1. 652 – (Socialist Federal Republic of Yugoslavia) Steve Zungul (New York Arrows, Golden Bay Earthquakes, San Diego Sockers, Tacoma Stars)
2. 463 – (Croatia) Branko Šegota (New York Arrows, San Diego Sockers, St. Louis Storm)
3. 406 – (Brazil) Tatu (Dallas Sidekicks)
4. 406 – (Canada) Dale Mitchell (Tacoma Stars, Kansas City Comets, Baltimore Blast)
5. 344 – (Netherlands) Jan Goossens (Golden Bay Earthquakes, Minnesota Strikers, Kansas City Comets, Dallas Sidekicks)
6. 332 – (Socialist Federal Republic of Yugoslavia) Preki (Tacoma Stars, St. Louis Storm)
7. 331 – (Croatia) Fred Grgurev (Philadelphia Fever, New York Arrows, New Jersey Rockets, Memphis/Las Vegas Americans, Pittsburgh Spirit, New York Express)
8. 307 – (England) Andy Chapman (Wichita Wings, Cleveland Force, Baltimore Blast)
9. 297 – (Guernsey) Craig Allen (New Jersey Rockets, Cleveland Force)
10. 297 – (Finland) Kai Haaskivi (Houston Summit, Cleveland Force, Baltimore Blast, Cleveland Crunch)

=== Assists ===
1. 471 – (Socialist Federal Republic of Yugoslavia) Steve Zungul (New York Arrows, Golden Bay Earthquakes, San Diego Sockers, Tacoma Stars)
2. 386 – (Finland) Kai Haaskivi (Houston Summit, Cleveland Force, Baltimore Blast, Cleveland Crunch)
3. 378 – (Socialist Federal Republic of Yugoslavia) Branko Šegota (New York Arrows, San Diego Sockers, St. Louis Storm)
4. 338 – (Ecuador) Chico Borja (New York Cosmos, Las Vegas Americans, Wichita Wings, Los Angeles Lazers)
5. 338 – (Netherlands) Jan Goossens (Golden Bay Earthquakes, Minnesota Strikers, Kansas City Comets, Dallas Sidekicks)
6. 332 – (Socialist Federal Republic of Yugoslavia) Preki (Tacoma Stars, St. Louis Storm)
7. 311 – (Socialist Federal Republic of Yugoslavia) Stan Stamenkovic (Memphis Americans, Baltimore Blast)
8. 284 – (Brazil) Tatu (Dallas Sidekicks)
9. 280 – (Canada) Dale Mitchell (Tacoma Stars, Kansas City Comets, Baltimore Blast)
10. 271 – (Denmark) Jørgen Kristensen (Wichita Wings, Kansas City Comets)

=== Goals against average ===
(9,500 minutes minimum)

1. 4.03 – (Hungary) Zoltán Tóth (New York Arrows, San Diego Sockers, St. Louis Storm)
2. 4.09 – (Canada) Tino Lettieri (Minnesota Strikers)
3. 4.14 – (Poland) Krys Sobieski (Pittsburgh Spirit, Cleveland Force, Dallas Sidekicks)
4. 4.18 – (Mozambique) Victor Nogueira (Chicago Sting, Cleveland Force, San Diego Sockers)
5. 4.21 – (United States) David Brcic (New York Cosmos, Wichita Wings, Pittsburgh Spirit, Los Angeles Lazers, Kansas City Comets, St. Louis Storm)
6. 4.26 – (Socialist Federal Republic of Yugoslavia) Slobo Ilijevski (St. Louis Steamers, Baltimore Blast, St. Louis Storm)
7. 4.32 – (United States) P. J. Johns (Cleveland Force, Tacoma Stars, Cleveland Crunch)
8. 4.35 – (United States) Jim Gorsek (San Diego Sockers, Los Angeles Lazers, Kansas City Comets, St. Louis Storm)
9. 4.3972 – (United States) Joe Papaleo (Pittsburgh Spirit, Tacoma Stars, Dallas Sidekicks)
10. 4.3979 – (United States) Keith Van Eron (Cincinnati Kids, Wichita Wings, Philadelphia Fever, Baltimore Blast, Las Vegas Americans)

== Awards ==
=== Most Valuable Player ===
Year	Winner
1978–79	Steve Zungul, New York
1979–80	Steve Zungul, New York
1980–81	Steve Zungul, New York
1981–82	Steve Zungul, New York and Stan Terlecki, Pittsburgh
1982–83	Alan Mayer, San Diego
1983–84	Stan Stamenkovic, Baltimore
1984–85	Steve Zungul, San Diego
1985–86	Steve Zungul, San Diego
1986–87	Tatu, Dallas
1987–88	Erik Rasmussen, Wichita
1988–89	Preki, Tacoma
1989–90	Tatu, Dallas
1990–91	Victor Nogueira, San Diego
1991–92	Victor Nogueira, San Diego

=== Scoring Champion ===
Year	Winner
1978–79	Fred Grgurev, Philadelphia
1979–80	Steve Zungul, New York
1980–81	Steve Zungul, New York
1981–82	Steve Zungul, New York
1982–83	Steve Zungul, New York/Golden Bay
1983–84	Stan Stamenkovic, Baltimore
1984–85	Steve Zungul, San Diego
1985–86	Steve Zungul, San Diego/Tacoma
1986–87	Tatu, Dallas
1987–88	Erik Rasmussen, Wichita
1988–89	Preki, Tacoma
1989–90	Tatu, Dallas
1990–91	Tatu, Dallas
1991–92	Zoran Karic, Cleveland

=== MISL Pass Master ===
The Pass Master award was given out to the player with the most assists during the regular season.

Year	Winner
1978–79	Fred Grgurev, Philadelphia
1979–80	Steve Zungul, New York
1980–81	Jorgen Kristiansen, Wichita
1981–82	Steve Zungul, New York
1982–83	Stan Stamenkovic, Memphis
1983–84	Stan Stamenkovic, Baltimore
1984–85	Steve Zungul, San Diego
1985–86	Steve Zungul, San Diego/Tacoma
1986–87	Kai Haaskivi, Cleveland
1987–88	Preki, Tacoma
1988–89	Preki, Tacoma and Chico Borja, Wichita
1989–90	Jan Goossens, Kansas City
1990–91	Tatu, Dallas
1991–92	Zoran Karic, Cleveland

=== Defender of the Year ===
Year	Winner
1981–82	Val Tuksa, New York
1982–83	Bernie James, Cleveland
1983–84	Kim Roentved, Wichita
1984–85	Kevin Crow, San Diego
1985–86	Kim Roentved, Wichita
1986–87	Bruce Savage, Baltimore
1987–88	Kevin Crow, San Diego
1988–89	Kevin Crow, San Diego
1989–90	Wes McLeod, Dallas
1990–91	Kevin Crow, San Diego
1991–92	Kevin Crow, San Diego

=== Goalkeeper of the Year ===
Year	Winner
1978–79	Paul Hammond, Houston
1979–80	Sepp Gantenhammer, Houston
1980–81	Enzo Di Pede, Chicago
1981–82	Slobo Ilijevski, St. Louis
1982–83	Zoltán Tóth, New York
1983–84	Slobo Ilijevski, St. Louis
1984–85	Scott Manning, Baltimore
1985–86	Keith Van Eron, Baltimore
1986–87	Tino Lettieri, Minnesota
1987–88	Zoltán Tóth, San Diego
1988–89	Victor Nogueira, San Diego
1989–90	Joe Papaleo, Dallas
1990–91	Victor Nogueira, San Diego
1991–92	Victor Nogueira, San Diego

=== Rookie of the Year ===
Year	Winner
1979–80	Jim Sinclair, Buffalo
1980–81	Don Ebert, St. Louis
1981–82	Germain Iglesias, Buffalo
1982–83	Kirk Shermer, Los Angeles
1983–84	Kevin Maher, Pittsburgh
1984–85	Ali Kazemaini, Cleveland
1985–86	Dave Boncek, Kansas City
1986–87	John Stollmeyer, Cleveland
1987–88	David Doyle, Kansas City
1988–89	Rusty Troy, Baltimore
1989–90	Terry Brown, St. Louis
1990–91	David Banks, San Diego
1991–92	Tommy Tanner, Cleveland

=== Newcomer of the Year ===
This award was given to 'the most outstanding player in his first year of competition in the Major Indoor Soccer League' in order to differentiate it from the Rookie of the Year award.

Year	Winner
1986–87	Steve Kinsey, Minnesota
1987–88	Nenad "Ziggy" Zigante, Wichita
1988–89	Domenic Mobilio, Baltimore
1989–90	Claudio DeOliviera, St. Louis
1990–91	Paul Peschisolido, Kansas City

=== Coach of the Year ===
Year	Winner
1978–79	Timo Liekoski, Houston
1979–80	Len Bilous, Pittsburgh and Pat McBride, St. Louis
1980–81	Don Popovic, New York
1981–82	Dave Clements, Denver
1982–83	Pat McBride, Kansas City
1983–84	Kenny Cooper, Baltimore
1984–85	Peter Wall, Los Angeles
1985–86	Gordon Jago, Dallas
1986–87	Dave Clements, Kansas City
1987–88	Ron Newman, San Diego
1988–89	Kenny Cooper, Baltimore
1989–90	Billy Phillips, Dallas
1990–91	Trevor Dawkins, Cleveland
1991–92	Gordon Jago, Dallas

=== Championship Series Most Valuable Player ===
Year	Winner
1978–79	Shep Messing, New York
1979–80	Steve Zungul, New York
1980–81	Steve Zungul, New York
1981–82	Steve Zungul, New York
1982–83	Juli Veee, San Diego
1983–84	Scott Manning, Baltimore
1984–85	Steve Zungul, San Diego
1985–86	Brian Quinn, San Diego
1986–87	Tatu, Dallas
1987–88	Hugo Perez, San Diego
1988–89	Victor Nogueira, San Diego
1989–90	Brian Quinn, San Diego
1990–91	Ben Collins, San Diego
1991–92	Thompson Usiyan, San Diego

=== Championship Series Unsung Hero ===
This award was given to the player 'in the Championship Series whose impact to his team's success was measured by hustle, determination and leadership.'

Year	Winner
1987–88	George Fernandez, San Diego
1988–89	Paul Dougherty, San Diego
1989–90	Paul Wright, San Diego
1990–91	Glenn Carbonara, San Diego
1991–92	Kevin Crow, San Diego

== Prominent players ==
- (United States) Ralph Black
- (United States) (Ecuador) Chico Borja
- (England) Andy Chapman
- (United States) (England) Paul Child
- (United States) (Uruguay) Fernando Clavijo
- (United States) Dan Counce
- (United States) Kevin Crow
- (Trinidad and Tobago) Steve David
- (United States) Rick Davis
- (Canada) Enzo Di Pede
- (United States) Daryl Doran
- (United States) Don Ebert
- (Canada) Pat Ercoli
- (Iran) (Armenia) Andranik Eskandarian
- (United States) Joey Fink
- (Netherlands) Jan Goossens
- (Germany) Karl-Heinz Granitza
- (Canada) (Scotland) Gerry Gray
- (United States) (Croatia) Fred Grgurev
- (Finland) Kai Haaskivi
- (Socialist Federal Republic of Yugoslavia) (United States) Slobo Ilijevski
- (England) Tommy Jenkins
- (United States) (Romania) Erhardt Kapp
- (Serbia) Zoran Karić
- (New Zealand) Michael King
- (Denmark) Jorgen Kristensen
- (United States) Mickey Kydes
- (United States) (Liberia) Doc Lawson
- (Canada) (Italy) Tino Lettieri
- (United States) (Croatia) Mark Liveric
- (United States) Dave MacWilliams
- (United States) Scott Manning
- (Argentina) Pato Margetic
- (Canada) Hector Marinaro
- (United States) Alan Mayer
- (Canada) Wes McLeod
- (Canada) Dale Mitchell
- (United States) (North Macedonia) George Nanchoff
- (Mozambique) Victor Nogueira
- (United States) Steve Pecher
- (United States) (El Salvador) Hugo Perez
- (Serbia) Ljupko Petrović
- (United States) (Serbia) Preki
- (Denmark) Erik Rasmussen
- (Denmark) Kim Roentved
- (Canada) Carl Rose
- (United States) Bruce Savage
- (Canada) (Croatia) Branko Šegota
- (Socialist Federal Republic of Yugoslavia) (Serbia) Stan Stamenkovic
- (United States) John Stremlau
- (Canada) Mike Sweeney
- (Brazil) Tatu
- (Poland) Stan Terlecki
- (Cameroon) Jean-Pierre Tokoto
- (Hungary) Zoltán Tóth
- (Nigeria) Thompson Usiyan
- (Canada) (England) Carl Valentine
- (United States) (Hungary) Juli Veee
- (England) Peter Ward
- (Germany) Jean Willrich
- (Socialist Federal Republic of Yugoslavia) (Croatia) Steve Zungul

== Television and radio coverage ==
The MISL made inroads on national television in 1982–83. While the spring would see the end of the league's two-year deal with the USA Network, CBS would broadcast a playoff game live from Cleveland on May 7 that drew an estimated four million viewers. One game during the 1983–84 season was televised on CBS (Game 3 of the championship series on June 2) as well.

1984–85 would be the final year the MISL would have games aired on network television, CBS broadcast Game 4 of the championship series live on May 25.
