= Major Indoor Soccer League (1978–1992) on television =

The Major Indoor Soccer League, known in its final two seasons as the Major Soccer League, was an indoor soccer league in the United States that played matches from fall 1978 to spring 1992.

== National coverage ==
=== Hughes Television Network (1979) ===
For the MISL's first season, a mini‐playoff package of the indoor championships was broadcast on the Hughes Television Network, which was an ad hoc syndicated network. In the New York area, WOR 9 broadcast two weekend games. The finals — a two‐of‐three‐game series which was scheduled to begin either on a Thursday or Friday — would be seen in New York the following week.

=== USA Network (1981–1983) ===
Beginning in the 1981–82 season, the USA Network broadcast a Friday night Game of the Week. USA employed Al Trautwig and Kyle Rote Jr. as their primary broadcasting crew.

Despite the exposure during its two-year deal with USA, MISL officials were continuously inquiring about how much they were paying them. USA told the MISL's television committee that they weren't getting any big ratings and couldn't pay them. The USA Network during its infancy only had about 1.3 million subscribers. An even smaller percentage of those subscribers watched sports programming, much less indoor soccer.

=== CBS (1983–1985) ===
On May 7, 1983, the MISL made its network television debut on CBS, who carried the playoff game between the Baltimore Blast and Cleveland Force in Cleveland. CBS used this particular game as counter-programming against the Kentucky Derby on ABC. Ultimately however, CBS only got a 2.4 rating and 6 share. John Tesh and Al Trautwig called the very first broadcast for CBS.

The following year on June 2, CBS broadcast Baltimore-St. Louis Steamers championship series game from St. Louis. This time, the ratings sunk to a 1.5 rating and 6 share.

On May 25, 1985, CBS showed Game 4 of the championship series between the San Diego Sockers and the Baltimore Blast. This would be the final year that the MISL would have its games aired on network television. For this final game, CBS used Gary Bender and Kyle Rote Jr. on commentary.

=== ESPN (1985–1987) ===
The MISL landed a steady national TV contract for the first time since 1983 when they were on USA, as ESPN would televise 15 regular-season games on Sunday afternoons, the All-Star Game and assorted playoff games. beginning in the 1985–86 season. The MISL received no broadcast revenues from ESPN. In other words, the agreement with ESPN to have the league pay the cable network to televise its games. Bill Kentling, director and general manager of the Wichita Wings, was vehemently against the ESPN deal, thinking that was ridiculous to go against the National Football League without having any time to set up sponsorship. Commissioner Frank Dale however, disagreed with Kentling's assessment saying: "If I held out waiting for money for the rights for something that has traditionally not done well in the ratings, we'd still be off the air." Ultimately, the MISL got only three sponsors for the weekly telecasts on ESPN.

For the 1986–87 season, ESPN actually paid the MISL a fee instead of the league paying the network, as it had done the previous season. This time, ESPN broadcast 18 games, including the All-Star Game from Los Angeles, as well as four playoff games. The San Diego Sockers were scheduled to be on four delayed telecasts during the regular season.

On commentary, ESPN employed JP Dellacamera, Bob Kurtz, Bob Ley, and Bob Carpenter on play-by-play with Ty Keough, Seamus Malin, and Shep Messing as analysts.

=== FNN/Score (1987–1989) ===
The MISL marked the 1987–88 season by signing a two-year TV agreement with FNN/Score. This package included a Friday game of the week, as well as the All-Star Game, the entire championship series and a weekly highlight show. In San Diego (home of the Sockers), the games were not seen locally because FNN went off the air in San Diego before the games began. JP Dellacamera and Ty Keough were the primary broadcast team for FNN/Score.

=== ESPN (1989–1990) ===
The MISL returned to ESPN in time for the 1989–90 season, when they reached agreement with ESPN for a nine game TV schedule. ESPN also televised MISL playoff games on May 2, 17, 24, 27 and June 9. The last game was expected to be broadcast live, with the others tape-delayed, but shown the same day.

=== SportsChannel America (1990–1992) ===
As previously mentioned, the Major Indoor Soccer League was known in its final two seasons as the Major Soccer League. At this time, commissioner Earl Foreman hoped to escalate the MSL's nine-game tape-delay ESPN contract into a live contract come the 1990–91 season. But a deal never came off, and Foreman had to settle for a 15-game live contract with SportsChannel America. The first year of what would be a two-year deal included 10 regular-season Sunday afternoon games billed and marketed as a "game of the week," the All-Star Game from Kansas City's Kemper Arena and four playoff games. The only game that was not broadcast live was a March 10, 1991 game between the Baltimore Blast and San Diego Sockers in San Diego. The game was played Saturday night and then shown on tape delay the next day at 4:05 p.m., Baltimore time.

SportsChannel's coverage began February 3, 1991 with the Wichita Wings playing at the Kansas City Comets. The rest of the regular-season schedule included: February 10—Cleveland at Tacoma; February 17—Wichita at Dallas; February 24—Kansas City at Cleveland; March 3 -- Tacoma at St. Louis; March 10—Baltimore at San Diego; March 17—Cleveland at Dallas; March 24—Wichita at Cleveland; March 31 -- St. Louis at San Diego; April 7 -- St. Louis at Wichita. John Griffin, MSL director of communications who put the TV schedule together, said Baltimore's inability to start its Sunday home games at 4:05 p.m. prevented the Blast from being televised more often on SportsChannel.

In the middle of what would be MSL's final season, 1991–92, commissioner Earl Foreman held preliminary talks with SportsChannel concerning added MSL coverage should the National Hockey League's strike continue. At the time, SportsChannel also held the American broadcasting rights to the NHL. Ultimately however, the NHL strike only lasted for ten days. Come playoff time, SportsChannel televised six playoff games. Earl Foreman said that owners decided to use all six telecasts on the championship series.

JP Dellacamera and Ty Keough served as the primary broadcast crew for SportsChannel.

== Broadcasters ==
=== Local broadcasters ===
Team	Television station	Television announcers
Baltimore Blast	WMAR; WJZ-TV WBFF-TV; Home Team Sports; Super TV	Al Trautwig, Lou Tilley, and Nick Zlatar Mike Fornes and Jim Pollihan
Buffalo Stallions	WUTV	Wayne Fuller, Fred Hartrick, and Nancy Drew
Chicago Sting	SportsVision; WPWR-TV	Chet Coppock, Mark Simanton, Howard Balson, and Dave Huson
Cincinnati Kids	WLWT	Tom Kelly and Bob Trumpy
Cleveland Crunch	SportsChannel Ohio	Steve French and Ty Keough
Cleveland Force	WOIO; WUAB	Denny Schreiner, Bill McDermott, Nev Chandler, and Jack Corrigan
Dallas Sidekicks	HSE; KTXA	Norm Hitzges, Mike Renshaw, and Timm Matthews
Denver Avalanche	KWGN-TV	Jim Conrad, Kyle Rote Jr., and Michael Ditchfield
Golden Bay Earthquakes	KICU-TV	Jon Miller and John Shrader
Kansas City Comets	KCTV; American Cablevision	Don Fortune, Jack Harry, Kevin Wall, Clive Griffiths, and Chuck Heinz
Los Angeles Lazers	KCAL-TV; Prime Ticket	Chick Hearn, Bob Miller, Joel Meyers, and Bill MacDonald
Memphis Americans	WHBQ-TV	Chris O'Donoghue
New York Arrows	WPIX; WOR-TV; MSG; SportsChannel New York	Terry Leiweke, Kyle Rote Jr., Spencer Ross, Roy Messing, Steve Albert, Nick Zlatar, and Bob Goldsholl
New York Cosmos	SportsChannel New York	Al Trautwig, Bob Ley, and Seamus Malin
New York Express	SportsChannel New York	Steve Grad, JP Dellacamera, and Seamus Malin
Philadelphia Fever	WPHL-TV; PRISM	Harry Kalas, Rudy Getzinger, Andy Musser, and Walter Chyzowych
Pittsburgh Spirit	KDKA-TV; CAC	John Sanders, JP Dellacamera, Terry Leiweke, and Chris Wright
San Diego Sockers	KUSI-TV; KSWB-TV; San Diego Cable Sports Network; Prime Ticket	Randy Hahn, Alan Mayer, Richard Saxton, Bill MacDonald, Don Ebert, and Dick Calvert
St. Louis Steamers	KDNL-TV; Sports Time	Bob Carpenter, JP Dellacamera, Bob Kehoe, Bob Brunette, John Sloan, Joel Meyers, and Bill McDermott
St. Louis Storm	KPLR-TV	Rich Gould and Ty Keough
Tacoma Stars	KSTW; Prime Sports Northwest	Bob Robertson, Jimmy McAlister, and Scott Coleman
Wichita Wings	KSN; KAKE-TV	Mike Kennedy, Steve Shaad, Dave Phillips, and Roy Turner

==== Notes ====
- In their inaugural season, the Los Angeles Lazers games were broadcast on Cable Radio Network. Beginning in the second season, Bill MacDonald asked Jerry Buss and Ron Weinstein for permission to broadcast the Lazers home games on KBOB radio in Pasadena. MacDonald's family agreed to purchase the air time, and MacDonald's long running career was launched. During the 1983–84 season, the Lazers made the first entree into the television arena by broadcasting a few games on the Lakers and Kings KCAL 9 television network. Chick Hearn, the Lakers broadcaster, and Bob Miller, the Kings broadcaster, shared the play-by-play responsibilities. During the 1984–85 season, the Lazers began to broadcast their games on Prime Ticket, which was the regional sports network created by Dr. Jerry Buss for Southern California. This first Lazers broadcast was only the second event to have ever been aired on the Prime Ticket Network. Joel Meyers, a new and upcoming telecaster, joined MacDonald to become the team that announced every play from then on for the Lazers.
- The Wichita Wings would appear nationally on the USA Network, ESPN, and CBS. Their first local television contract was with KSN-TV (NBC) and announcer Dave Armstrong in 1981–82. KSN would continue to broadcast the Wings through the 1985–86 season. Other announcers included Craig Bolerjack, Mike Kennedy, and Steve Dennis. Former Wing Joe Howarth and Director of Media Relations Steve Shaad, respectively, would serve as the color commentator for several of those seasons. The 1986–87 season saw KAKE-TV (ABC) take over the broadcast. Mark Allan would be their announcer through the 1988–89 season. The Wings would have no television contract thereafter. KFH Radio (1330 AM) would broadcast the Wings from 1981 through 1986, with first Bruce Haertl and then Jim Hawley announcing. Steve Shaad, Blake Schreck, and Klaus Kollmai served as color commentators on the KFH broadcasts. In 1986, KRZ (1240 AM) took over the radio broadcasting, with Dave Phillips as announcer. As KNSS, they would continue to broadcast the Wings through the 1989–90 season. Phillips would be the voice of the Wings with KZSN (1480 AM) through the 1993 season. Steve Dennis took over KZSN's announcing duties in 1994 and continued through the transition to KFH in 1995–96. Former Wings goalkeeper Kris Peat served as announcer in 1996–97. In 1997, Rob Barzegar and KQAM (1480 AM) became the Wings radio broadcaster.

=== National broadcasters ===
The MISL made inroads on national television in 1982–83. While the spring would see the end of the league's two-year deal with the USA Network, CBS would broadcast a playoff game live from Cleveland on May 7 that drew an estimated four million viewers. One game during the 1983–84 season was televised on CBS (Game 3 of the championship series on June 2) as well.

1984–85 would be the final year the MISL would have games aired on network television, CBS broadcast Game 4 of the championship series live on May 25.

For the 1985–86 season, there was a steady national TV contract for the first time since 1983, as ESPN would televise 15 regular-season games and assorted playoff games.

Television network	Television announcers
CBS	Gary Bender, Kyle Rote Jr., Dick Stockton, John Tesh, and Al Trautwig
ESPN	JP Dellacamera, Ty Keough, Bob Kurtz, Bob Ley, Seamus Malin, Shep Messing, and Bob Carpenter
Hughes	Jim Karvellas and Kyle Rote Jr.
Score	JP Dellacamera and Ty Keough
SportsChannel America	JP Dellacamera and Ty Keough
USA	Al Trautwig, Jim Karvellas, and Kyle Rote Jr.
