= 1981–82 Major Indoor Soccer League season =

Major Indoor Soccer League
- Season: 1981–82
- Champions: New York Arrows (4th title)
- Matches: 286
- Goals: 2,921 (10.21 per match)
- Top goalscorer: (Socialist Federal Republic of Yugoslavia) Steve Zungul (103 goals)
- Average attendance: 8,735

The 1981–82 Major Indoor Soccer League season was the fourth in league history and would end with the New York Arrows repeating once again as MISL champions.

== Recap ==
It was a year of expansion, as the New Jersey Rockets were added and the schedule was lengthened by almost two months. The 44-game regular-season schedule was an increase of four games, and the playoff schedule was expanded to two best-of-three rounds and one best-of-five championship series. This was done to, as a league spokesman put it, force players to decide on either the indoor or outdoor game

With the Hartford Hellions moving to Memphis and the San Francisco Fog moving to Kansas City, the league went back to a two-division setup. The top four finishers in each division would advance to the MISL playoffs. The Pittsburgh Spirit returned, and had the second-best record in the league.

While the Arrows had the best record in the league and Steve Zungul won the scoring title again, New York was pushed hard in the playoffs. In their first round matchup with the Buffalo Stallions, the Stallions won the first game of the series in New York and held a 4-2 lead with 1:20 remaining in Game 2. Zungul and Omar Gomez scored 36 seconds apart to tie the match, and Dragan Simic scored in overtime to even the series. New York won Game 3 to advance.

New York and St. Louis would eventually meet in a five-game championship series that would see every game decided by two goals or less, including two in overtime.

After the season, the Philadelphia Fever would fold and the New Jersey Rockets and Denver Avalanche suspended operations.

== Teams ==
Team	City/Area	Arena
Baltimore Blast	Baltimore	Baltimore Arena
Buffalo Stallions	Buffalo, New York	Buffalo Memorial Auditorium
Cleveland Force	Cleveland	Richfield Coliseum
Denver Avalanche	Denver	McNichols Sports Arena
Kansas City Comets	Kansas City, Missouri	Kemper Arena
Memphis Americans	Memphis, Tennessee	Mid-South Coliseum
New York Arrows	Uniondale, New York	Nassau Veterans Memorial Coliseum
New Jersey Rockets	East Rutherford, New Jersey	Brendan Byrne Arena
Philadelphia Fever	Philadelphia	The Spectrum
Phoenix Inferno	Phoenix, Arizona	Arizona Veterans Memorial Coliseum
Pittsburgh Spirit	Pittsburgh	Civic Arena (Pittsburgh)
St. Louis Steamers	St. Louis	St. Louis Arena
Wichita Wings	Wichita, Kansas	Kansas Coliseum

== Map of clubs ==
Eastern Division Western Division

== Regular season schedule ==
The 1981–82 regular season schedule ran from November 13, 1981, to April 25, 1982. The 44 games per team was an increase of four over the 1980–81 schedule of 40 games.

== Final standings ==
Playoff teams in bold.

Eastern Division	W	L	Pct.	GB	GF	GA	Home	Road
**New York Arrows**	36	8	.818	--	302	199	18-4	18-4
**Pittsburgh Spirit**	31	13	.705	5	254	208	17-5	14-8
**Baltimore Blast**	27	17	.525	9	223	207	15-7	12-10
**Buffalo Stallions**	24	20	.500	12	276	244	13-9	11-11
New Jersey Rockets	17	27	.386	19	195	230	9-13	8-14
Cleveland Force	15	29	.341	21	205	250	7-15	8-14
Philadelphia Fever	11	33	.250	25	175	250	7-15	4-18

Western Division	W	L	Pct.	GB	GF	GA	Home	Road
**St. Louis Steamers**	28	16	.636	--	228	182	15-7	13-9
**Wichita Wings**	27	17	.614	1	235	200	15-7	12-10
**Memphis Americans**	20	24	.455	8	250	271	14-8	6-16
**Denver Avalanche**	19	25	.432	9	182	203	16-6	3-19
Phoenix Inferno	17	27	.386	11	222	254	11-11	6-16
Kansas City Comets	14	30	.318	14	174	223	10-12	4-18

== Playoffs ==
Division Semifinals
E1	New York Arrows	2
E4	Buffalo Stallions	1
E2	Pittsburgh Spirit	1
E3	Baltimore Blast	2
W1	St. Louis Steamers	2
W4	Denver Avalanche	0
W2	Wichita Wings	2
W3	Memphis Americans	1

Division Finals
E1	New York Arrows	2
E3	Baltimore Blast	1
W1	St. Louis Steamers	2
W3	Wichita Wings	1

Championship Series
E1	New York Arrows	3
W1	St. Louis Steamers	2

=== Quarterfinals ===
New York vs. Buffalo
Date	Away	Home	Attendance
April 30	**Buffalo 9**	New York 7	4,223
May 2	**New York 5**	Buffalo 4	9,640
	Dragan Simic scored at 6:05 of overtime
May 5	Buffalo 6	**New York 10**	3,345
**New York wins series 2-1**

Pittsburgh vs. Baltimore
Date	Away	Home	Attendance
April 30	Baltimore 1	**Pittsburgh 3**	6,594
May 1	Pittsburgh 5	**Baltimore 6**	8,513
	Miguel Filardo scored at 5:12 of overtime
May 5	**Baltimore 6**	Pittsburgh 2	5,985
**Baltimore wins series 2-1**

St. Louis vs. Denver
Date	Away	Home	Attendance
April 28	Denver 2	**St. Louis 4**	11,641
April 30	**St. Louis 7**	Denver 6	7,306
**St. Louis wins series 2-0**

Wichita vs. Memphis
Date	Away	Home	Attendance
April 29	**Memphis 5**	Wichita 3	6,613
May 1	**Wichita 6**	Memphis 3	5,682
May 2	Memphis 3	**Wichita 12**	7,573
**Wichita wins series 2-1**

=== Semifinals ===
New York vs. Baltimore
Date	Away	Home	Attendance
May 7	Baltimore 5	**New York 6**	10,244
	Paul Kitson scored at 10:19 of overtime
May 8	**New York 6**	Baltimore 2	9,643
**New York wins series 2-0**

St. Louis vs. Wichita
Date	Away	Home	Attendance
May 7	Wichita 5	**St. Louis 10**	12,436
May 9	St. Louis 6	**Wichita 7**	9,643
	Andy Chapman scored at :39 of overtime
May 12	Wichita 1	**St. Louis 4**	11,498
	St. Louis wins series 2-1

=== Championship Series ===
New York vs. St. Louis
Date	Away	Home	Attendance
May 14	**St. Louis 3**	New York 2	7,921
	Tony Glavin scored at 5:55 of overtime
May 16	St. Louis 3	**New York 5**	7,431
May 21	**New York 9**	St. Louis 8	18,160
	Steve Zungul scored at 4:13 of overtime
May 23	New York 4	**St. Louis 6**	18,116
May 26	St. Louis 6	**New York 8**	11,023
**New York wins series 3-2**

== Regular season player statistics ==
=== Scoring leaders ===
GP = Games Played, G = Goals, A = Assists, Pts = Points

Player	Team	GP	G	A	Pts
(Socialist Federal Republic of Yugoslavia) Steve Zungul	New York Arrows	40	103	60	163
(Poland) Stan Terlecki	Pittsburgh Spirit	43	74	43	117
(Socialist Federal Republic of Yugoslavia) Stan Stamenkovic	Memphis Americans	36	46	47	83
(Trinidad and Tobago) Steve David	Phoenix Inferno	44	58	23	81
(United States) Paul Child	Pittsburgh Spirit	44	52	29	81
(Argentina) Omar Gomez	New York Arrows	40	40	36	76
(United States) Keith Furphy	Cleveland Force	44	50	25	75
(United States) Joey Fink	Baltimore Blast	43	51	22	73
(Peru) Germain Iglesias	Buffalo Stallions	44	46	25	71
(United States) Don Ebert	St. Louis Steamers	44	52	19	71

=== Leading goalkeepers ===
Note: GP = Games played; Min = Minutes played; GA = Goals against; GAA = Goals against average; W = Wins; L = Losses

Player	Team	GP	Min	GA	GAA	W	L
(Socialist Federal Republic of Yugoslavia) Slobo Ilijevski	St. Louis Steamers	36	2103	135	3.85	24	11
(United States) Keith Van Eron	Baltimore Blast	32	1664	110	3.97	18	12
(United States) Pascal Antoine	Denver Avalanche	18	881	60	4.09	6	7
(Poland) Krys Sobieski	Pittsburgh Spirit	29	1498	105	4.20	19	7
(Canada) Victor Petroni	Kansas City Comets	18	898	63	4.21	7	8
(Hungary) Zoltán Tóth	New York Arrows	17	1022	74	4.34	15	2
(United States) Van Taylor	Phoenix Inferno	29	1217	89	4.39	10	8
(Wales) Mike Dowler	Wichita Wings	37	2149	162	4.52	22	14
(United States) Shep Messing	New York Arrows	27	1652	125	4.54	21	6
(United States) Alan Mayer	New Jersey Rockets	27	1527	116	4.56	8	16

== Playoff player statistics ==
=== Scoring leaders ===
GP = Games Played, G = Goals, A = Assists, Pts = Points

Player	Team	GP	G	A	Pts
(Socialist Federal Republic of Yugoslavia) Steve Zungul	New York Arrows	10	24	8	32
(Argentina) Omar Gomez	New York Arrows	10	11	11	22
(United States) Greg Villa	St. Louis Steamers	10	7	9	16
(Scotland) Tony Glavin	St. Louis Steamers	8	9	4	13
(Canada) Carl Rose	St. Louis Steamers	10	8	4	12

=== Leading goalkeepers ===
Note: GP = Games played; Min = Minutes played; GA = Goals against; GAA = Goals against average; W = Wins; L = Losses

Player	Team	GP	Min	GA	GAA	W	L
(Poland) Krys Sobieski	Pittsburgh Spirit	2	120	5	2.50	1	1
(Hungary) Zoltán Tóth	New York Arrows	5	306	21	4.12	4	1
(United States) Keith Van Eron	Baltimore Blast	5	298	21	4.22	2	3
(Socialist Federal Republic of Yugoslavia) Slobo Ilijevski	St. Louis Steamers	10	611	49	4.81	6	4
(United States) Cliff Brown	Wichita Wings	6	359	30	5.02	3	3

== All-MISL teams ==
First Team	Position	Second Team
(Socialist Federal Republic of Yugoslavia) Slobo Ilijevski, St. Louis	G	(Wales) Mike Dowler, Wichita
(Socialist Federal Republic of Yugoslavia) Val Tuksa, New York	D	(Scotland) Ian Anderson, Cleveland
(Poland) Helmut Dudek, Memphis	D	(England) Kevin Kewley, Wichita
(Socialist Federal Republic of Yugoslavia) Steve Zungul, New York	M	(Trinidad and Tobago) Steve David, Phoenix
(Poland) Stan Terlecki, Pittsburgh	F	(United States) Joey Fink, Baltimore
(Socialist Federal Republic of Yugoslavia) Stan Stamenkovic, Memphis	F	(Scotland) Tony Glavin, St. Louis

Honorable Mention	Position	
(United States) Shep Messing, New York	G	(Poland) Krys Sobieski, Pittsburgh
(Brazil) Renato Cila, New York	D	(United States) John O'Hara, Pittsburgh
(Canada) Dave McKenzie, Pittsburgh	D	(Canada) Carl Rose, St. Louis
(Denmark) Kim Roentved, Wichita		
(United States) Paul Child, Pittsburgh	F	(Denmark) Jorgen Kristensen, Wichita
(England) Keith Furphy, Cleveland	F	(United States) Don Ebert, St. Louis

== League awards ==
- Most Valuable Player: (Socialist Federal Republic of Yugoslavia) Steve Zungul, New York/Stan Terlecki, Pittsburgh
- Scoring Champion: (Socialist Federal Republic of Yugoslavia) Steve Zungul, New York
- Pass Master: (Socialist Federal Republic of Yugoslavia) Steve Zungul, New York
- Rookie of the Year: (Peru) Germain Iglesias, Buffalo
- Defender of the Year: (Socialist Federal Republic of Yugoslavia) Val Tuksa, New York
- Goalkeeper of the Year: (Socialist Federal Republic of Yugoslavia) Slobo Ilijevski, St. Louis
- Coach of the Year: (Northern Ireland) Dave Clements, Denver
- Championship Series Most Valuable Player: (Socialist Federal Republic of Yugoslavia) Steve Zungul, New York
