= 1982–83 Major Indoor Soccer League season =

Major Indoor Soccer League
- Season: 1982–83
- Champions: San Diego Sockers
- Matches: 316
- Goals: 3,498 (11.07 per match)
- Top goalscorer: (Socialist Federal Republic of Yugoslavia) Steve Zungul (75 goals)
- Average attendance: 7,895

The 1982–83 Major Indoor Soccer League season was the fifth in league history and would end with the San Diego Sockers winning their first MISL title. It would be the Sockers' second straight indoor championship, as the club had won the North American Soccer League's indoor league the previous spring.

== Recap ==
The league would enter into an agreement with the NASL in the summer of 1982 to begin plans for an eventual merger. Initial plans to have all 14 NASL teams play in the winter would not come to pass, as most teams preferred to concentrate on the outdoor season. However, the Chicago Sting and Golden Bay Earthquakes would join the Sockers for the MISL season.

The Earthquakes would perform worst of the three NASL teams, but picked up Steve Zungul from the New York Arrows when New York's new management decided to try to 'Americanize' the team in an attempt to boost ticket sales. The Arrows, only two games out of first place when the trade was made on January 19, finished at .500 and were eliminated in the first round of the playoffs. Despite the Quakes' struggles, Zungul would win the MISL scoring title again.

The expansion Los Angeles Lazers, owned by the Los Angeles Lakers' Jerry Buss, set a record for the lowest winning percentage in league history. After the season, Chicago, San Diego and Golden Bay withdrew and returned to the NASL as the league made plans for an indoor return the following winter. Despite losing the NASL teams, the league continued to expand as teams were announced for Tacoma in 1983-84 and Dallas for 1984–85.

The MISL continued to make inroads on national television. While the spring would see the end of the league's two-year deal with the USA Network, CBS would broadcast a playoff game live from Cleveland on May 7 that drew an estimated four million viewers.

== Teams ==
Team	City/Area	Arena
Baltimore Blast	Baltimore, Maryland	Baltimore Arena
Buffalo Stallions	Buffalo, New York	Buffalo Memorial Auditorium
Chicago Sting	Chicago	Chicago Stadium
Cleveland Force	Cleveland, Ohio	Richfield Coliseum
Golden Bay Earthquakes	Oakland, California	Oakland–Alameda County Coliseum Arena
Kansas City Comets	Kansas City, Missouri	Kemper Arena
Los Angeles Lazers	Inglewood, California	The Forum
Memphis Americans	Memphis, Tennessee	Mid-South Coliseum
New York Arrows	Uniondale, New York	Nassau Veterans Memorial Coliseum
Phoenix Inferno	Phoenix, Arizona	Arizona Veterans Memorial Coliseum
Pittsburgh Spirit	Pittsburgh, Pennsylvania	Civic Arena (Pittsburgh)
San Diego Sockers	San Diego, California	San Diego Sports Arena
St. Louis Steamers	St. Louis, Missouri	St. Louis Arena
Wichita Wings	Wichita, Kansas	Kansas Coliseum

== Map of clubs ==
Eastern Division Western Division

== Regular season schedule ==
The 1982–83 regular season schedule ran from November 5, 1982, to April 17, 1983. The 48 games per team was an increase of four over the 1981–82 schedule of 44 games.

== Final standings ==
Playoff teams in bold.

Eastern Division	W	L	Pct.	GB	GF	GA	Home	Road
**Baltimore Blast**	30	18	.625	--	249	224	19-5	11-13
**Cleveland Force**	29	19	.604	1	285	267	16-8	13-11
**Chicago Sting**	28	20	.583	2	285	239	17-7	11-13
**New York Arrows**	24	24	.500	6	225	219	15-9	9-15
Pittsburgh Spirit	24	24	.500	6	250	247	15-9	9-15
Buffalo Stallions	22	26	.458	8	270	274	13-11	9-15
Memphis Americans	19	29	.396	11	239	274	15-9	4-20

Western Division	W	L	Pct.	GB	GF	GA	Home	Road
**San Diego Sockers**	32	16	.667	--	289	230	19-5	13-11
**Wichita Wings**	27	21	.563	5	273	249	17-7	10-14
**Kansas City Comets**	26	22	.542	6	219	210	17-7	9-15
**St. Louis Steamers**	26	22	.542	6	234	234	15-9	11-13
Phoenix Inferno	24	24	.500	8	249	255	17-7	7-17
Golden Bay Earthquakes	17	31	.354	15	240	290	8-16	9-15
Los Angeles Lazers	8	40	.167	24	191	286	6-18	2-22

== Playoffs ==
Division Semifinals
E1	Baltimore Blast	2
E4	New York Arrows	1
E2	Cleveland Force	2
E3	Chicago Sting	1
W1	San Diego Sockers	2
W4	Kansas City Comets	0
W2	Wichita Wings	2
W3	St. Louis Steamers	1

Division Finals
E1	Baltimore Blast	3
E2	Cleveland Force	2
W1	San Diego Sockers	3
W2	Wichita Wings	0

Championship Series
E1	Baltimore Blast	2
W1	San Diego Sockers	3

=== Quarterfinals ===
Baltimore vs. New York
Date	Away	Home	Attendance
April 19	New York 4	**Baltimore 11**	10,511
April 22	Baltimore 6	**New York 7**	7,157
April 23	New York 3	**Baltimore 8**	11,223
**Baltimore wins series 2-1**

Cleveland vs. Chicago
Date	Away	Home	Attendance
April 19	**Chicago 9**	Cleveland 5	8,519
April 21	**Cleveland 5**	Chicago 4	9,643
April 23	Chicago 5	**Cleveland 7**	19,106
**Cleveland wins series 2-1**

San Diego vs. Kansas City
Date	Away	Home	Attendance
April 20	Kansas City 2	**San Diego 6**	9,120
April 23	**San Diego 9**	Kansas City 4	15,957
**San Diego wins series 2-0**

Wichita vs. St. Louis
Date	Away	Home	Attendance
April 19	St. Louis 5	**Wichita 6**	8,355
	Andy Chapman scored at 13:01 of overtime
April 23	Wichita 2	**St. Louis 8**	13,881
April 25	St. Louis 7	**Wichita 9**	9,875
**Wichita wins series 2-1**

=== Semifinals ===
Baltimore vs. Cleveland
Date	Away	Home	Attendance
April 26	**Cleveland 7**	Baltimore 6	9,787
April 29	Cleveland 5	**Baltimore 10**	11,223
May 5	**Baltimore 7**	Cleveland 3	16,136
May 7	Baltimore 3	**Cleveland 6**	12,178
May 10	Cleveland 6	**Baltimore 8**	11,311
**Baltimore wins series 3-2**

San Diego vs. Wichita
Date	Away	Home	Attendance
April 28	Wichita 5	**San Diego 8**	11,340
April 30	Wichita 2	**San Diego 5**	11,520
May 6	**San Diego 4**	Wichita 3	9,725
**San Diego wins series 3-0**

=== Championship Series ===
San Diego vs. Baltimore
Date	Away	Home	Attendance
May 13	Baltimore 0	**San Diego 6**	12,549
May 15	Baltimore 0	**San Diego 7**	12,185
May 17	San Diego 3	**Baltimore 4**	11,223
May 19	San Diego 6	**Baltimore 7**	11,431
	Joe Fink scored at 1:03 of overtime
May 23	Baltimore 1	**San Diego 3**	12,948
**San Diego wins series 3-2**

== Regular season player statistics ==
=== Scoring leaders ===
GP = Games Played, G = Goals, A = Assists, Pts = Points

Player	Team	GP	G	A	Pts
(Socialist Federal Republic of Yugoslavia) Steve Zungul	New York/Golden Bay	43	75	47	122
(Socialist Federal Republic of Yugoslavia) Stan Stamenkovic	Memphis Americans	41	55	65	120
(United States) Juli Veee	San Diego Sockers	37	57	53	110
(Poland) Stan Terlecki	Pittsburgh Spirit	45	65	40	105
(Argentina) Omar Gomez	Wichita Wings	44	37	49	86
(Guernsey) Craig Allen	Cleveland Force	45	53	31	84
(England) Keith Furphy	Cleveland Force	48	56	28	84
(Finland) Kai Haaskivi	Cleveland Force	46	38	46	84
(Trinidad and Tobago) Steve David	Phoenix Inferno	47	61	20	81
(Argentina) Ruben Astigarraga	Phoenix Inferno	43	34	46	80

=== Leading goalkeepers ===
Note: GP = Games played; Min = Minutes played; GA = Goals against; GAA = Goals against average; W = Wins; L = Losses

Player	Team	GP	Min	GA	GAA	W	L
(Hungary) Zoltán Tóth	New York Arrows	27	1555	104	4.01	12	14
(Socialist Federal Republic of Yugoslavia) Slobo Ilijevski	St. Louis Steamers	44	2548	175	4.12	23	19
(United States) Keith Van Eron	Baltimore Blast	38	1969	138	4.20	23	9
(United States) Alan Mayer	San Diego Sockers	43	2407	172	4.29	30	10
(Canada) Victor Petroni	Kansas City Comets	26	1498	112	4.49	14	10
(United States) Victor Nogueira	Chicago Sting	28	1441	110	4.58	14	12
(Italy) Enzo DiPede	Kansas City Comets	24	1362	109	4.80	12	12
(Wales) Mike Dowler	Wichita Wings	42	2502	203	4.87	25	17
(Socialist Federal Republic of Yugoslavia) Blagoje Tamindzic	Phoenix Inferno	39	2252	183	4.88	19	18
(Poland) Krys Sobieski	Pittsburgh Spirit	41	2273	185	4.88	19	20

== Playoff Player Statistics ==
=== Scoring leaders ===
GP = Games Played, G = Goals, A = Assists, Pts = Points

Player	Team	GP	G	A	Pts
(United States) Juli Veee	San Diego Sockers	10	13	19	32
(United States) Dave MacWilliams	Baltimore Blast	13	12	11	23
(Germany) Heinz Wirtz	Baltimore Blast	13	10	11	21
(United States) Joey Fink	Baltimore Blast	13	12	8	20
(Poland) Kaz Deyna	San Diego Sockers	9	14	4	18

=== Leading goalkeepers ===
Note: GP = Games played; Min = Minutes played; GA = Goals against; GAA = Goals against average; W = Wins; L = Losses

Player	Team	GP	Min	GA	GAA	W	L
(United States) Alan Mayer	San Diego Sockers	10	587	28	2.86	8	2
(United States) Keith Van Eron	Baltimore Blast	10	556	49	5.29	4	6
(Wales) Mike Dowler	Wichita Wings	6	357	33	5.55	2	4
(Puerto Rico) Cris Vaccaro	Cleveland Force	7	321	36	6.73	2	3

== All-MISL Teams ==
First Team	Position	Second Team
(United States) Alan Mayer, San Diego	G	(United States) Keith Van Eron, Baltimore
(Socialist Federal Republic of Yugoslavia) Val Tuksa, New York	D	(United States) Greg Makowski, Kansas City
(Germany) Heinz Wirtz, Baltimore	D	(Denmark) Kim Roentved, Wichita
(United States) Juli Veee, San Diego	M	(Denmark) Jorgen Kristensen, Wichita
(Socialist Federal Republic of Yugoslavia) Steve Zungul, New York/Golden Bay	F	(Poland) Stan Terlecki, Pittsburgh
(Socialist Federal Republic of Yugoslavia) Stan Stamenkovic, Memphis	F	(Finland) Kai Haaskivi, Cleveland

Honorable Mention	Position
(Socialist Federal Republic of Yugoslavia) Slobo Ilijevski, St. Louis	G
(Brazil) Renato Cila, New York	D
(Poland) Helmut Dudek, Memphis	D
(Argentina) Pato Margetic, Chicago	F
(Poland) Kaz Deyna, San Diego	F

== League awards ==
Most Valuable Player: Alan Mayer, San Diego

Scoring Champion: (Socialist Federal Republic of Yugoslavia) Steve Zungul, New York/Golden Bay

Pass Master: (Socialist Federal Republic of Yugoslavia) Stan Stamenkovic, Baltimore

Defender of the Year: (United States) Bernie James, Cleveland

Rookie of the Year: (United States) Kirk Shermer, Los Angeles

Goalkeeper of the Year: (Hungary) Zoltán Tóth, New York

Coach of the Year: (United States) Pat McBride, Kansas City

Championship Series Most Valuable Player: (United States) Juli Veee, San Diego
