= 1983–84 Major Indoor Soccer League season =

Major Indoor Soccer League
- Season: 1983–84
- Champions: Baltimore Blast
- Matches: 288
- Goals: 2,827 (9.82 per match)
- Top goalscorer: (United States) Mark Liveric (58 goals)
- Average attendance: 8,707

The 1983–84 Major Indoor Soccer League season was the sixth in league history and ended with the Baltimore Blast winning their first MISL championship. The Blast would beat the St. Louis Steamers in the championship series, the third time in five seasons the Steamers would lose in the MISL championship round. This would be the first time the MISL finals would be a best-of-seven series, part of the league's expanded playoff format.

== Recap ==
With the North American Soccer League restarting their indoor league in the fall of 1983, the defending champion San Diego Sockers, Chicago Sting and Golden Bay Earthquakes would not rejoin the MISL for the upcoming season. To replace the teams, the Tacoma Stars (actually the reactivated Denver Avalanche) began play this season.

While there were some franchises who would begin a run of respectability at the box office, the Cleveland Force chief among them, others would see the end of their run. The New York Arrows, Buffalo Stallions and Phoenix Pride would all go out of business at the end of the season. Despite winning the first four MISL titles, the Arrows never gained a foothold in the New York market. Changing the name of the Phoenix franchise (GM Ted Podleski hated the Inferno name, and wanted a name more in tune with his Christian beliefs) would not bring about an improved record and new owner Bruce Merrill was ready to fold after losing $2 million in less than a year. The Stallions, in particular, would be caught trying to move out of their Buffalo Memorial Auditorium offices without paying back rent, similar to what had happened with the NFL's Baltimore Colts a few months earlier.

Not all news was bad. The Force and Blast routinely drew strong crowds, and the new franchise in Tacoma nearly made the playoffs. The MISL drew 2.5 million to their games, and another 300,000 attended the playoff games. One game was televised on CBS (Game 3 of the championship series on June 2), as well.

After the season, the Memphis Americans would move to Las Vegas.

== Teams ==
Team	City/Area	Arena
Baltimore Blast	Baltimore, Maryland	Baltimore Arena
Buffalo Stallions	Buffalo, New York	Buffalo Memorial Auditorium
Cleveland Force	Cleveland, Ohio	Richfield Coliseum
Kansas City Comets	Kansas City, Missouri	Kemper Arena
Los Angeles Lazers	Inglewood, California	The Forum
Memphis Americans	Memphis, Tennessee	Mid-South Coliseum
New York Arrows	Uniondale, New York	Nassau Veterans Memorial Coliseum
Phoenix Pride	Phoenix, Arizona	Arizona Veterans Memorial Coliseum
Pittsburgh Spirit	Pittsburgh, Pennsylvania	Civic Arena (Pittsburgh)
St. Louis Steamers	St. Louis, Missouri	St. Louis Arena
Tacoma Stars	Tacoma, Washington	Tacoma Dome
Wichita Wings	Wichita, Kansas	Kansas Coliseum

== Map of clubs ==
Eastern Division Western Division

== Regular season schedule ==
The 1983–84 regular season schedule ran from November 4, 1983, to April 21, 1984. It would be the first time in MISL history that the length of the schedule stayed the same as the previous year. In this case, each team continued to play 48 games apiece.

== Final standings ==
Playoff teams in bold.

Eastern Division	W	L	Pct.	GB	GF	GA	Home	Road
**Baltimore Blast**	34	14	.708	--	280	203	20-4	14-10
**Pittsburgh Spirit**	32	16	.667	2	245	204	19-5	13-11
**Cleveland Force**	31	17	.646	3	269	229	18-6	13-11
**New York Arrows**	20	28	.417	14	232	280	12-12	8-16
Memphis Americans	18	30	.375	16	216	284	14-10	4-20
Buffalo Stallions	15	33	.313	19	226	279	12-12	3-21

Western Division	W	L	Pct.	GB	GF	GA	Home	Road
**St. Louis Steamers**	26	22	.542	--	220	202	16-8	10-14
**Wichita Wings**	25	23	.521	1	237	228	17-7	8-16
**Los Angeles Lazers**	24	24	.500	2	223	239	13-11	11-13
**Kansas City Comets**	23	25	.479	3	232	246	15-9	8-16
Tacoma Stars	22	26	.458	4	226	232	14-10	8-16
Phoenix Pride	18	30	.375	8	221	249	12-12	6-18

== Playoffs ==
Division Semifinals
E1	Baltimore Blast	3
E4	New York Arrows	1
E2	Pittsburgh Spirit	1
E3	Cleveland Force	3
W1	St. Louis Steamers	3
W4	Kansas City Comets	2
W2	Wichita Wings	3
W3	Los Angeles Lazers	1

Division Finals
E1	Baltimore Blast	3
E3	Cleveland Force	0
W1	St. Louis Steamers	3
W2	Wichita Wings	0

Championship Series
E1	Baltimore Blast	4
W1	St. Louis Steamers	1

=== Quarterfinals ===
Baltimore vs. New York
Date	Away	Home	Attendance
April 27	New York 5	**Baltimore 11**	11,220
April 29	**New York 9**	Baltimore 8	10,606
	Mark Liveric scored at :17 of overtime
May 4	**Baltimore 4**	New York 3	2,353
May 9	**Baltimore 14**	New York 5	1,779
**Baltimore wins series 3-1**

Pittsburgh vs. Cleveland
Date	Away	Home	Attendance
April 26	**Cleveland 6**	Pittsburgh 4	7,002
April 27	Cleveland 1	**Pittsburgh 4**	11,739
May 1	Pittsburgh 5	**Cleveland 6**	10,383
	Alex Tarnoczi scored at 11:46 of overtime
May 4	Pittsburgh 3	**Cleveland 5**	18,630
**Cleveland wins series 3-1**

St. Louis vs. Kansas City
Date	Away	Home	Attendance
April 24	Kansas City 4	**St. Louis 6**	7,445
April 27	Kansas City 6	**St. Louis 7**	12,235
May 5	St. Louis 1	**Kansas City 2**	15,007
May 9	St. Louis 3	**Kansas City 5**	13,127
May 13	Kansas City 5	**St. Louis 6**	13,273
**St. Louis wins series 3-2**

Wichita vs. Los Angeles
Date	Away	Home	Attendance
April 24	Los Angeles 7	**Wichita 10**	8,782
May 1	**Los Angeles 6**	Wichita 4	9,586
May 4	**Wichita 5**	Los Angeles 4	4,522
May 7	**Wichita 6**	Los Angeles 5	3,392
**Wichita wins series 3-1**

=== Semifinals ===
Baltimore vs. Cleveland
Date	Away	Home	Attendance
May 12	Cleveland 4	**Baltimore 5**	11,034
May 16	Cleveland 5	**Baltimore 6**	9,110
May 17	**Baltimore 7**	Cleveland 2	10,591
**Baltimore wins series 3-0**

St. Louis vs. Wichita
Date	Away	Home	Attendance
May 16	Wichita 3	**St. Louis 4**	8,695
May 19	Wichita 6	**St. Louis 7**	13,112
May 22	**St. Louis 5**	Wichita 4	9,681
	Tony Bellinger scored at 1:55 of overtime
**St. Louis wins series 3-0**

=== Championship Series ===
Baltimore vs. St. Louis
Date	Away	Home	Attendance
May 27	**St. Louis 7**	Baltimore 3	11,546
May 31	St. Louis 3	**Baltimore 5**	10,778
June 2	**Baltimore 5**	St. Louis 2	14,114
June 6	**Baltimore 5**	St. Louis 4	15,302
	Stan Stamenkovic scored at 1:59 of overtime
June 8	St. Louis 3	**Baltimore 10**	12,007
**Baltimore wins series 4-1**

== Regular Season Player Statistics ==
=== Scoring leaders ===
GP = Games Played, G = Goals, A = Assists, Pts = Points

Player	Team	GP	G	A	Pts
(Socialist Federal Republic of Yugoslavia) Stan Stamenkovic	Baltimore Blast	46	34	69	97
(Finland) Kai Haaskivi	Cleveland Force	47	37	51	88
(Guernsey) Craig Allen	Cleveland Force	44	49	37	86
(United States) Mark Liveric	New York Arrows	48	58	26	84
(United States) Fred Grgurev	New York/Memphis	50	42	34	76
(England) Andy Chapman	Wichita Wings	46	53	21	74
(United States) Poli Garcia	Los Angeles Lazers	48	39	33	72
(England) Keith Furphy	Cleveland Force	48	39	31	70
(England) Gordon Hill	Kansas City Comets	41	46	24	70
(United States) Louis Nanchoff	Cleveland Force	42	36	33	69

=== Leading goalkeepers ===
Note: GP = Games played; Min = Minutes played; GA = Goals against; GAA = Goals against average; W = Wins; L = Losses

Player	Team	GP	Min	GA	GAA	W	L
(Socialist Federal Republic of Yugoslavia) Slobo Ilijevski	St. Louis Steamers	40	2336	143	3.67	22	15
(United States) Scott Manning	Baltimore Blast	28	1552	104	4.02	18	8
(United States) Joe Papaleo	Pittsburgh Spirit	25	1455	100	4.12	16	8
(England) Mike Mahoney	Los Angeles Lazers	42	2390	172	4.32	19	18
(Wales) Mike Dowler	Wichita Wings	46	2724	196	4.32	25	21
(Poland) Krys Sobieski	Cleveland Force	32	1716	125	4.37	19	7
(Canada) John Baretta	Tacoma Stars	30	1741	130	4.48	11	14
(Socialist Federal Republic of Yugoslavia) Blagoje Tamindzic	Phoenix Pride	30	1486	116	4.68	9	14
(Italy) Enzo DiPede	Kansas City Comets	39	2180	174	4.79	18	18
(Poland) Wieslaw Surlit	Buffalo Stallions	35	1736	155	5.36	10	20

== Playoff Player Statistics ==
=== Scoring leaders ===
GP = Games Played, G = Goals, A = Assists, Pts = Points

Player	Team	GP	G	A	Pts
(Socialist Federal Republic of Yugoslavia) Stan Stamenkovic	Baltimore Blast	12	13	20	33
(United States) Dave MacWilliams	Baltimore Blast	12	12	14	26
(United States) Njego Pesa	St. Louis Steamers	13	15	9	24
(Canada) Pat Ercoli	Baltimore Blast	10	16	2	18
(United States) Don Ebert	St. Louis Steamers	12	9	7	16

=== Leading goalkeepers ===
Note: GP = Games played; Min = Minutes played; GA = Goals against; GAA = Goals against average; W = Wins; L = Losses

Player	Team	GP	Min	GA	GAA	W	L
(United States) Scott Manning	Baltimore Blast	9	500	31	3.72	8	0
(Puerto Rico) Cris Vaccaro	Cleveland Force	6	325	22	4.06	3	3
(Italy) Enzo DiPede	Kansas City Comets	5	286	22	4.62	2	2
(Socialist Federal Republic of Yugoslavia) Slobo Ilijevski	St. Louis Steamers	10	596	48	4.83	6	4
(Wales) Mike Dowler	Wichita Wings	7	398	34	5.13	3	3

== All-MISL Teams ==
First Team	Position	Second Team
(Socialist Federal Republic of Yugoslavia) Slobo Ilijevski, St. Louis	G	(Wales) Mike Dowler, Wichita
(United States) Sam Bick, St. Louis	D	(United States) Tony Bellinger, St. Louis
(Denmark) Kim Roentved, Wichita	D	(United States) Greg Makowski, Kansas City
(Finland) Kai Haaskivi, Cleveland	M	(Guernsey) Craig Allen, Cleveland
(United States) Art Hughes, Memphis	M	(United States) Greg Makowski, Kansas City
(Socialist Federal Republic of Yugoslavia) Stan Stamenkovic, Baltimore	F	(England) Gordon Hill, Kansas City
(England) Andy Chapman, Wichita	F	(United States) Mark Liveric, New York

Honorable Mention	Position
(United States) Scott Manning, Baltimore	G
(Poland) Helmut Dudek, Memphis	D
(England) Ray Evans, Tacoma	D
(Brazil) Batata, Los Angeles	F
(United States) Poli Garcia, Los Angeles	F

== League awards ==
Most Valuable Player: (Socialist Federal Republic of Yugoslavia) Stan Stamenkovic, Baltimore

Scoring Champion: (Socialist Federal Republic of Yugoslavia) Stan Stamenkovic, Baltimore

Pass Master: (Socialist Federal Republic of Yugoslavia) Stan Stamenkovic, Baltimore

Defender of the Year: (Denmark) Kim Roentved, Wichita

Rookie of the Year: (Republic of Ireland) Kevin Maher, Pittsburgh

Goalkeeper of the Year: (Socialist Federal Republic of Yugoslavia) Slobo Ilijevski, St. Louis

Coach of the Year: (England) Kenny Cooper Sr., Baltimore

Championship Series Most Valuable Player: (United States) Scott Manning, Baltimore

== Team Attendance Totals ==
Club	Games	Total	Average
Kansas City Comets	24	378,864	15,786
St. Louis Steamers	24	335,805	13,992
Cleveland Force	24	328,619	13,692
Baltimore Blast	24	268,534	11,189
Wichita Wings	24	216,824	9,034
Pittsburgh Spirit	24	198,668	8,278
Memphis Americans	24	157,361	6,557
Phoenix Pride	24	142,157	5,923
New York Arrows	24	131,472	5,478
Tacoma Stars	24	127,728	5,322
Buffalo Stallions	24	116,020	4,834
Los Angeles Lazers	24	105,720	4,405
**OVERALL**	**288**	**2,507,722**	**8,707**
