= 1987–88 Major Indoor Soccer League season =

Major Indoor Soccer League
- Season: 1987–88
- Champions: San Diego Sockers (4th title)
- Matches: 308
- Goals: 2,745 (8.91 per match)
- Top goalscorer: (Canada) Hector Marinaro (58 goals)
- Average attendance: 8,439

The 1987–88 Major Indoor Soccer League season was the tenth in league history and ended with the San Diego Sockers winning their sixth indoor title in seven years over the Cleveland Force.

== Teams ==
Team	City/Area	Arena
Baltimore Blast	Baltimore, Maryland	Baltimore Arena
Chicago Sting	Chicago, Illinois	Rosemont Horizon
Cleveland Force	Cleveland, Ohio	Richfield Coliseum
Dallas Sidekicks	Dallas, Texas	Reunion Arena
Kansas City Comets	Kansas City, Missouri	Kemper Arena
Los Angeles Lazers	Inglewood, California	The Forum
Minnesota Strikers	Bloomington, Minnesota	Met Center
San Diego Sockers	San Diego, California	San Diego Sports Arena
St. Louis Steamers	St. Louis, Missouri	St. Louis Arena
Tacoma Stars	Tacoma, Washington	Tacoma Dome
Wichita Wings	Wichita, Kansas	Kansas Coliseum

== Map of clubs ==
Eastern Division Western Division

== Regular season schedule ==
The 1987-88 regular season schedule ran from November 4, 1987, to April 17, 1988. The schedule was lengthened to 56 games per team, the longest to date in MISL history.

== Final standings ==
Playoff teams in bold.

Eastern Division	W	L	Pct.	GB	GF	GA	Home	Road
**Minnesota Strikers**	31	25	.554	-	274	252	22-6	9-19
**Cleveland Force**	30	26	.536	1	242	219	20-8	10-18
**Dallas Sidekicks**	28	28	.500	3	200	204	22-6	6-22
**Baltimore Blast**	25	31	.446	6	235	249	18-10	7-21
Chicago Sting	24	32	.429	7	227	247	15-13	9-19

Western Division	W	L	Pct.	GB	GF	GA	Home	Road
**San Diego Sockers**	42	14	.750	-	277	189	23-5	19-9
**Los Angeles Lazers**	31	25	.554	11	291	266	17-11	14-14
**Kansas City Comets**	29	27	.518	13	294	290	19-9	10-18
**Tacoma Stars**	27	29	.482	15	259	285	21-7	6-22
Wichita Wings	23	33	.411	19	232	261	18-10	5-23
St. Louis Steamers	18	38	.321	24	214	280	12-16	6-22

== Playoffs ==
Division Semifinals
E1	Minnesota Strikers	3
E4	Baltimore Blast	1
E2	Cleveland Force	3
E3	Dallas Sidekicks	1
W1	San Diego Sockers	3
W4	Tacoma Stars	1
W2	Los Angeles Lazers	0
W3	Kansas City Comets	3

Division Finals
E1	Minnesota Strikers	1
E2	Cleveland Force	4
W1	San Diego Sockers	4
W3	Kansas City Comets	3

Championship Series
E2	Cleveland Force	0
W1	San Diego Sockers	4

- QUARTER-FINALS:
  - Minnesota defeated Baltimore, 5–3, 4–2, 1–5, 9-4
  - Cleveland defeated Dallas, 3–2, 3–6, 5-4 (2OT), 5-2
  - Kansas City defeated Los Angeles, 9–6, 4–2, 7-5
  - San Diego defeated Tacoma, 6–2, 3-4 (OT), 7–2, 7-6
- SEMI-FINALS:
  - Cleveland defeated Minnesota, 7–3, 0–7, 5–4, 5–2, 7-2
  - San Diego defeated Kansas City, 4–5, 5–4, 6-7(OT), 3–7, 7–1, 6–1, 8-5
- CHAMPIONSHIP:
  - San Diego defeated Cleveland, 6-5(OT), 6–1, 3–2, 7-4

=== Scoring leaders ===
GP = Games Played, G = Goals, A = Assists, Pts = Points

Player	Team	GP	G	A	Pts
(Denmark) Erik Rasmussen	Wichita Wings	51	55	57	112
(United States) Preki	Tacoma Stars	56	53	58	111
(Netherlands) Jan Goossens	Kansas City Comets	53	45	56	101
(United States) Chico Borja	Los Angeles Lazers	54	47	51	98
(Canada) Dale Mitchell	Kansas City Comets	51	48	47	95
(Canada) Branko Segota	San Diego Sockers	45	56	33	89
(Nigeria) Thompson Usiyan	Los Angeles Lazers	51	52	36	88
(England) Peter Ward	Tacoma Stars	52	47	41	88
(Socialist Federal Republic of Yugoslavia) Steve Zungul	Tacoma Stars	52	47	41	88
(Canada) Hector Marinaro	Minnesota Strikers	56	58	23	81

== All-MISL Teams ==
First Team	Position	Second Team
(Hungary) Zoltan Toth, San Diego	G	(Poland) Krys Sobieski, Dallas
(United States) Kevin Crow, San Diego	D	(United States) Bruce Savage, Baltimore
(United States) Fernando Clavijo, San Diego	D	(England) Chris Whyte, Los Angeles
(Canada) Branko Segota, San Diego	M	(United States) Chico Borja, Los Angeles
(United States) Preki, Tacoma	F	(Canada) Hector Marinaro, Minnesota
(Denmark) Erik Rasmussen, Wichita	F	(Netherlands) Jan Goossens, Kansas City

== League awards ==
Most Valuable Player: (Denmark) Erik Rasmussen, Wichita

Scoring Champion: (Denmark) Erik Rasmussen, Wichita

Pass Master: (United States) Preki, Tacoma

Defender of the Year: (United States) Kevin Crow, San Diego

Rookie of the Year: (Republic of Ireland) David Doyle, Kansas City

Newcomer of the Year: (Socialist Federal Republic of Yugoslavia) Nanad Zigante, Wichita

Goalkeeper of the Year: (Hungary) Zoltan Toth, San Diego

Coach of the Year: (England) Ron Newman, San Diego

Championship Series Most Valuable Player: (United States) Hugo Perez, San Diego

Championship Series Unsung Hero: (United States) George Fernandez, San Diego
