= 1985–86 Major Indoor Soccer League season =

Major Indoor Soccer League
- Season: 1985–86
- Champions: San Diego Sockers (3rd title)
- Matches: 288
- Goals: 2,743 (9.52 per match)
- Top goalscorer: (Denmark) Erik Rasmussen (67 goals)
- Average attendance: 8,717

The 1985–86 Major Indoor Soccer League season was the eighth in league history and ended with the San Diego Sockers winning their third MISL title in four seasons over the Minnesota Strikers. It was the Sockers' fifth straight indoor title, as they had also won the North American Soccer League's indoor league in 1982 and 1984.

== Recap ==
For the most part, the league format remained unchanged. A 48-game season would be followed with an eight-team playoff, similar to the playoff system used from 1982 to 1984. There would be one major change in gameplay, however. The shootout, part of the MISL since its inception, was dropped in favor of multiple overtime periods to decide games, if necessary. There was a steady national TV contract for the first time since 1983, as ESPN would televise 15 regular-season games and assorted playoff games.

The East and West division races were a study in contrasts. San Diego ran away with the West again, despite selling reigning league MVP Steve Zungul to the Tacoma Stars for $200,000 halfway through the regular season. Tacoma would go 11-8 with Zungul, who won the league scoring title for the sixth time in the MISL's eight years. However, the Stars lost in four games to the Sockers in the league semifinals.

In the East, the six-team division was separated by only four games. The playoff positions were only confirmed when the Baltimore Blast defeated the Pittsburgh Spirit in the season finale. The Dallas Sidekicks switched divisions and promptly won 13 more games than the previous year, making the playoffs for the first time and earning Gordon Jago Coach of the Year honors.

For the second straight year, the Strikers and Sockers went to a deciding game in their playoff matchup. San Diego became the first team to rally from a two-game deficit to win a MISL playoff series, as the Strikers' 3-1 lead in the championship series disappeared under three straight Socker wins. In the first seventh game in MISL history, the Sockers held off a late Minnesota charge to win 5-3. San Diego's Brian Quinn scored two goals and an assist on his way to playoff MVP honors.

After the season, the Spirit folded, and the league made plans to return to New York with an expansion franchise.

== Teams ==
Team	City/Area	Arena
Baltimore Blast	Baltimore, Maryland	Baltimore Arena
Chicago Sting	Chicago	Chicago Stadium
Cleveland Force	Cleveland, Ohio	Richfield Coliseum
Dallas Sidekicks	Dallas, Texas	Reunion Arena
Kansas City Comets	Kansas City, Missouri	Kemper Arena
Los Angeles Lazers	Inglewood, California	The Forum
Minnesota Strikers	Bloomington, Minnesota	Met Center
Pittsburgh Spirit	Pittsburgh, Pennsylvania	Civic Arena (Pittsburgh)
San Diego Sockers	San Diego, California	San Diego Sports Arena
St. Louis Steamers	St. Louis, Missouri	St. Louis Arena
Tacoma Stars	Tacoma, Washington	Tacoma Dome
Wichita Wings	Wichita, Kansas	Kansas Coliseum

== Map of clubs ==
Eastern Division Western Division

== Regular season schedule ==
The 1985–86 regular season schedule ran from October 25, 1985, to April 6, 1986. Despite the loss of two teams from the 1984-85 lineup, the schedule remained at 48 games.

== Final standings ==
Playoff teams in bold.

Eastern Division	W	L	Pct.	GB	GF	GA	Home	Road
**Cleveland Force**	27	21	.563	--	252	212	15-9	12-12
**Minnesota Strikers**	26	22	.542	1	232	242	16-8	10-14
**Dallas Sidekicks**	25	23	.521	2	220	231	16-8	9-15
**Baltimore Blast**	24	24	.500	3	211	201	17-7	7-17
Chicago Sting	23	25	.479	4	196	196	14-10	9-15
Pittsburgh Spirit	23	25	.479	4	221	237	18-6	5-19

Western Division	W	L	Pct.	GB	GF	GA	Home	Road
**San Diego Sockers**	36	12	.750	--	308	195	21-3	15-9
**Wichita Wings**	27	21	.563	9	258	226	15-9	12-12
**Tacoma Stars**	23	25	.479	13	208	232	15-9	8-16
**St. Louis Steamers**	23	25	.479	13	223	233	16-8	7-17
Kansas City Comets	18	30	.375	18	217	268	12-12	6-18
Los Angeles Lazers	13	35	.271	23	197	270	9-15	4-20

== Playoffs ==
Division Semifinals
E1	Cleveland Force	3
E4	Baltimore Blast	2
E2	Minnesota Strikers	3
E3	Dallas Sidekicks	1
W1	San Diego Sockers	3
W4	St. Louis Steamers	1
W2	Wichita Wings	1
W3	Tacoma Stars	3

Division Finals
E1	Cleveland Force	1
E2	Minnesota Strikers	3
W1	San Diego Sockers	3
W3	Tacoma Stars	1

Championship Series
E2	Minnesota Strikers	3
W1	San Diego Sockers	4

=== Quarterfinals ===
Cleveland vs. Baltimore
Date	Away	Home	Attendance
April 8	Baltimore 2	**Cleveland 7**	8,666
April 13	**Baltimore 8**	Cleveland 3	19,468
April 15	Cleveland 6	**Baltimore 8**	7,631
April 18	**Cleveland 4**	Baltimore 3	12,232
	Kai Haaskivi scored at 3:21 of overtime
April 20	Baltimore 1	**Cleveland 5**	16,626
**Cleveland wins series 3-2**

Minnesota vs. Dallas
Date	Away	Home	Attendance
April 12	Dallas 3	**Minnesota 5**	7,101
April 13	Dallas 2	**Minnesota 7**	5,151
April 16	Minnesota 3	**Dallas 4**	10,218
April 19	**Minnesota 7**	Dallas 4	13,908
**Minnesota wins series 3-1**

San Diego vs. St. Louis
Date	Away	Home	Attendance
April 10	St. Louis 6	**San Diego 7**	7,506
	Gary Collier scored at 11:31 of overtime
April 12	St. Louis 3	**San Diego 5**	10,123
April 16	San Diego 7	**St. Louis 8**	7,506
April 19	**San Diego 10**	St. Louis 4	9,464
**San Diego wins series 3-1**

Wichita vs. Tacoma
Date	Away	Home	Attendance
April 9	Tacoma 5	**Wichita 6**	7,382
April 12	**Tacoma 5**	Wichita 4	9,561
April 16	Wichita 4	**Tacoma 5**	14,162
	Fran O'Brien scored at 8:02 of overtime
April 18	Wichita 1	**Tacoma 3**	17,094
**Tacoma wins series 3-1**

=== Semifinals ===
Cleveland vs. Minnesota
Date	Away	Home	Attendance
April 25	Minnesota 2	**Cleveland 5**	18,797
April 27	**Minnesota 6**	Cleveland 2	16,877
May 2	Cleveland 5	**Minnesota 6**	10,254
	Thompson Usiyan scored at 2:08 of overtime
May 4	Cleveland 3	**Minnesota 7**	10,351
**Minnesota wins series 3-1**

San Diego vs. Tacoma
Date	Away	Home	Attendance
April 23	Tacoma 4	**San Diego 10**	8,308
April 29	Tacoma 2	**San Diego 7**	9,432
May 1	San Diego 3	**Tacoma 4**	15,290
May 7	**San Diego 8**	Tacoma 5	19,476
**San Diego wins series 3-1**

=== Championship Series ===
San Diego vs. Minnesota
Date	Away	Home	Attendance
May 9	Minnesota 2	**San Diego 7**	10,370
May 11	**Minnesota 6**	San Diego 1	9,172
May 16	San Diego 2	**Minnesota 7**	15,756
May 18	San Diego 3	**Minnesota 4**	15,849
May 21	Minnesota 4	**San Diego 7**	10,613
May 23	**San Diego 6**	Minnesota 3	15,944
May 26	Minnesota 3	**San Diego 5**	10,613
**San Diego wins series 4-3**

== Regular season player statistics ==
=== Scoring leaders ===
GP = Games Played, G = Goals, A = Assists, Pts = Points

Player	Team	GP	G	A	Pts
Steve Zungul	San Diego/Tacoma	46	55	60	115
Erik Rasmussen	Wichita Wings	47	67	41	108
Branko Segota	San Diego Sockers	45	60	46	106
Tatu	Dallas Sidekicks	44	49	32	81
Craig Allen	Cleveland Force	43	50	31	81
Stan Stamenkovic	Baltimore Blast	45	37	44	81
Karl-Heinz Granitza	Chicago Sting	43	28	47	75
Chico Borja	Wichita Wings	37	33	41	74
Preki	Tacoma Stars	48	41	30	71
Hugo Perez	San Diego Sockers	41	41	25	66

=== Leading goalkeepers ===
Note: GP = Games played; Min – Minutes played; GA = Goals against; GAA = Goals against average; W = Wins; L = Losses

Player	Team	GP	Min	GA	GAA	W	L
Keith Van Eron	Baltimore Blast	27	1491	91	3.66	14	10
Jim Gorsek	San Diego Sockers	24	1323	82	3.72	19	2
David Brcic	Pittsburgh Spirit	43	2659	167	3.77	21	22
Mike Dowler	Tacoma Stars	23	1327	92	4.16	9	12
Zoltán Tóth	San Diego Sockers	28	1562	109	4.19	17	9
Cris Vaccaro	Cleveland Force	36	2012	143	4.26	19	14
Victor Nogueira	Chicago Sting	37	1905	137	4.31	17	14
Tino Lettieri	Minnesota Strikers	41	2386	175	4.40	24	15
Krys Sobieski	Dallas Sidekicks	40	2469	182	4.42	24	16
Slobo Illjevski	St. Louis Steamers	39	2178	163	4.49	19	17

== Playoff player statistics ==
=== Scoring leaders ===
GP = Games Played, G = Goals, A = Assists, Pts = Points

Player	Team	GP	G	A	Pts
Branko Segota	San Diego Sockers	13	13	19	32
Brian Quinn	San Diego Sockers	13	13	10	23
Jan Goossens	Minnesota Strikers	15	12	9	21
Jean Willrich	San Diego Sockers	15	9	10	19
Thompson Usiyan	Minnesota Strikers	15	11	8	19
Juli Veee	San Diego Sockers	15	8	11	19

=== Leading goalkeepers ===
Note: GP = Games played; Min – Minutes played; GA = Goals against; GAA = Goals against average; W = Wins; L = Losses

Player	Team	GP	Min	GA	GAA	W	L
P.J. Johns	Cleveland Force	5	277	14	3.03	3	1
Tino Lettieri	Minnesota Strikers	15	866	51	3.52	9	6
Zoltán Tóth	San Diego Sockers	7	414	27	3.09	5	2
Scott Manning	Baltimore Blast	3	175	13	4.45	3	1
Seamus McDonough	Wichita Wings	2	128	10	4.65	1	1

== All-MISL teams ==
First Team	Position	Second Team
David Brcic, Pittsburgh	G	Jim Gorsek, San Diego
Kim Roentved, Wichita	D	Bruce Savage, Baltimore
Fernando Clavijo, San Diego	D	Bernie James, Cleveland
Branko Segota, San Diego	M	Chico Borja, Wichita
Steve Zungul, San Diego/Tacoma	F	Tatu, Dallas
Erik Rasmussen, Wichita	F	Craig Allen, Cleveland

Honorable Mention	Position
Krys Sobieski, Dallas	G
Kevin Crow, San Diego	D
Victor Moreland, Dallas	D
Brian Quinn, San Diego	F
Stan Stamenkovic, Baltimore	F

== League awards ==
- Most Valuable Player: Steve Zungul, San Diego/Tacoma
- Scoring Champion: Steve Zungul, San Diego/Tacoma
- Pass Master: Steve Zungul, San Diego/Tacoma
- Defender of the Year: Kim Roentved, Wichita
- Rookie of the Year: Dave Boncek, Kansas City Comets
- Goalkeeper of the Year: Keith Van Eron, Baltimore
- Coach of the Year: Gordon Jago, Dallas
- Championship Series Most Valuable Player: Brian Quinn, San Diego

== Team attendance totals ==
Club	Games	Total	Average
Cleveland Force	24	307,040	12,793
Kansas City Comets	24	298,269	12,428
Baltimore Blast	24	246,046	10,252
St. Louis Steamers	24	244,543	10,189
San Diego Sockers	24	229,935	9,581
Wichita Wings	24	202,725	8,447
Pittsburgh Spirit	24	186,597	7,775
Tacoma Stars	24	182,696	7,612
Chicago Sting	24	176,287	7,345
Dallas Sidekicks	24	165,694	6,904
Minnesota Strikers	24	156,071	6,503
Los Angeles Lazers	24	114,480	4,770
**OVERALL**	**288**	**2,510,383**	**8,717**
