= Joe Howarth =

Joe Howarth may refer to:

- Joe Howarth (footballer) (born 1954), English soccer defender
- Joe Howarth (politician) (born 1955), American politician in the New Jersey General Assembly
