= Alfredo Anhielo =

Argentine footballer

Personal information
- Date of birth: 30 August 1951 (age 75)
- Height: 6 ft 2 in (1.88 m)
- Position: Goalkeeper

Senior career*
| Years | Team | Apps | (Gls) |
| 1969–1970 | Defensores de Belgrano | | |
| 1971 | Colegiales | 7 | (1) |
| 1973 | Defensores de Belgrano | | |
| 1974–1975 | San Lorenzo | 45 | (0) |
| 1976–1978 | Banfield | 94 | (0) |
| 1978–1979 | Tampico Madero | | |
| 1979–1980 | Atlético Potosino | | |
| 1980–1981 | Los Angeles Aztecs | 38 | (0) |
| 1980–1981 | Los Angeles Aztecs (indoor) | 16 | (0) |
| 1982–1984 | Defensores de Belgrano | | |
| 1982–1983 | → Phoenix Inferno (loan) | 3 | (0) |
| 1985–1986 | Quilmes | 52 | (0) |
- * Club domestic league appearances and goals

Alfredo Anhielo (born 30 August 1951) is a former Argentine soccer player who played in the NASL.

== Career statistics ==
=== Club ===
| Club | Season | League | | | Cup | | Other | | Total | |
| Club | Season | Division | Apps | Goals | Apps | Goals | Apps | Goals | Apps | Goals |
|---|---|---|---|---|---|---|---|---|---|---|
| Los Angeles Aztecs | 1980 | NASL | 31 | 0 | 0 | 0 | 0 | 0 | 31 | 0 |
| Los Angeles Aztecs | 1981 | NASL | 7 | 0 | 0 | 0 | 0 | 0 | 7 | 0 |
| Los Angeles Aztecs | Total | | 38 | 0 | 0 | 0 | 0 | 0 | 38 | 0 |
| Los Angeles Aztecs (indoor) | 1980–81 | NASL Indoor | 16 | 0 | 0 | 0 | 0 | 0 | 16 | 0 |
| Phoenix Inferno (loan) | 1982–83 | MISL | 3 | 0 | 0 | 0 | 0 | 0 | 3 | 0 |
| Career total | | | 57 | 0 | 0 | 0 | 0 | 0 | 57 | 0 |
