= Houston Force =

American soccer club

The Houston Force were an American soccer club. In 1994, the club was originally called the Puerto Rico Islanders, but were forced to move by FIFA before playing any games. They instead played in Houston, Texas, where the Force only played one game before folding.

The team had only three players with any significant professional experience, David Vaudreuil, Chris Charles and Eloy Salgado. Vaudreuil and Charles had both played with the Tampa Bay Rowdies in 1993 and Salgado had played in MISL. The team hired experienced manager Hernan "Chico" Borja as head coach.

The Force played the Los Angeles Salsa on July 14, 1994, in Houston's Joe Kelly Butler Stadium. The Salsa handled the Force easily, winning 3-0, in front of an official attendance of 1,400 fans (estimated to be lower). Seven days later, the APSL executive board revoked the team's league membership based on financial issues.

== Year-by-year ==
Year	Division	League	Reg. season	Playoffs	Open Cup
1994	2	APSL	0–1 (Did not finish)	Did not qualify	Did not qualify

== Managers ==
- 1994: Chico Borja

== See also ==
- Houston Dynamo FC
