= Mike Reynolds (soccer) =

Canadian soccer player

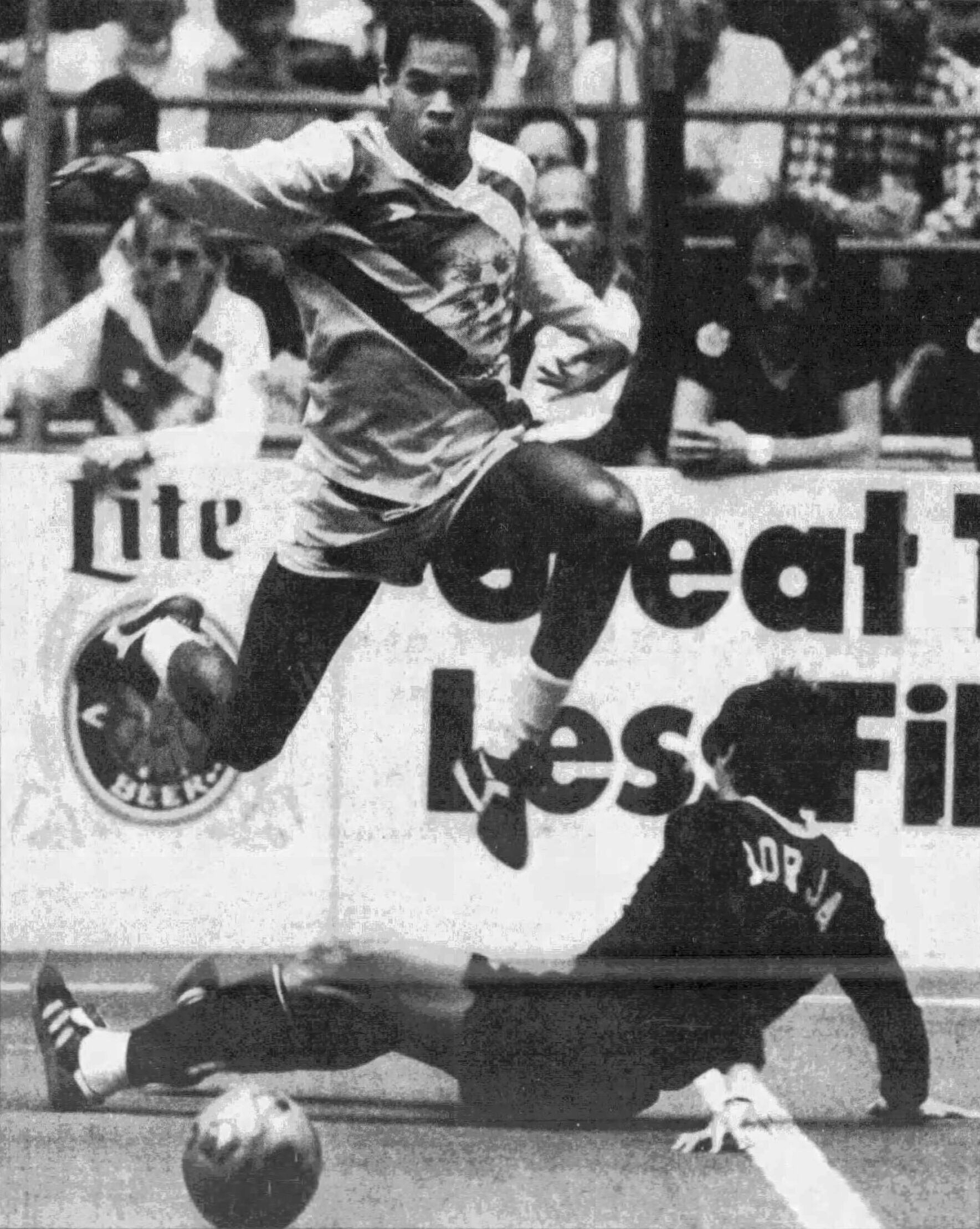
- Reynolds with the Baltimore Blast in 1988

Personal information
- Date of birth: September 22, 1963
- Place of birth: Toronto, Ontario, Canada
- Date of death: July 1, 1991 (aged 27)
- Place of death: Baltimore, Maryland, U.S.
- Height: 5 ft 11 in (1.80 m)
- Position: Defender

College career
Years	Team	Apps	(Gls)
1982–1985	George Mason Patriots	83	(28)

Senior career*
Years	Team	Apps	(Gls)
1986–1991	Baltimore Blast (indoor)	182	(32)
1988–1990	Washington Stars		
- * Club domestic league appearances and goals

Michael Reynolds was a Canadian soccer player. After graduating from George Mason University, he was drafted by the Baltimore Blast of the Major Indoor Soccer League. He played with the Blast for four seasons and scored 32 goals. At age 27, he suffered an unexpected stroke and died after a brief hospitalization.

== Early life ==
Reynolds was born on September 22, 1963, in Toronto, after his parents had moved from Jamaica to Canada. He grew up in Mississauga, a suburb of Toronto.

Reynolds was recruited to play college soccer at George Mason University in 1982. Over his four years with the George Mason Patriots, he started in all 83 games. He notched 28 goals and a school-record 18 assists. He earned All-American awards in his junior and senior years. Following Reynolds's death, Patriots coach Gordon Bradley described Reynolds as "probably the best soccer player to ever come out of George Mason".

== Career ==
Reynolds was selected in second round of the 1986 Major Indoor Soccer League draft. In his rookie season with the Baltimore Blast, he scored three goals and six assists across 35 appearances. At the conclusion of the 1986–87 season, he was named the Blast's rookie of the year.

He scored eight goals in the 1987–88 season. He missed the 1988–89 season due to issues with hypertension, during which time he completed his bachelor's degree in journalism at George Mason.

Reynolds played for the Washington Stars of the American Soccer League for its entire three-season existence from 1988 to 1990. There, he was reunited with Patriots coach Gordon Bradley, who also served as the Stars' general manager.

He returned to the Blast for the 1989–90 season and scored eight goals. His teammates named him for that season's "Unsung Hero" award. He scored 13 goals in the 1990–91 season.

== Death ==
On Saturday, June 29, 1991, Reynolds was one of several Blast players participating in a soccer clinic for inmates at the Jessup Pre-Release Unit in Jessup, Maryland. It was reportedly 99 °F (37 °C), and during a water break, Reynolds collapsed suddenly after getting up. He was packed in ice and rushed to St. Agnes Hospital. It was determined that he'd had a stroke, and he became paralyzed on his left side. Doctors ran a CAT scan, spinal tap, and other tests. He was alert and cognizant on Sunday morning, but his state worsened as the day progressed, and swelling in his brain caused him to enter a coma that night. He died at 3:30pm on Monday, July 1. He was buried in Mississauga the following weekend.

Per his family's wishes, no autopsy was performed, so the precise cause of his stroke is unknown. His known hypertension was named by medical experts as a likely factor, although team physician Dr. Larry Gallagher believed that the condition did not contribute as Reynolds was medicated and monitored for his blood pressure.

In October 1991, the Blast retired Reynolds's no. 3 jersey, and renamed their annual Unsung Hero award to the Mike Reynolds Trophy.

== Personal life ==
Reynolds had two younger brothers, Orville and Adrian, and one older sister, Sandra. Orville played for the George Washington Colonials men's soccer team from 1984 to 1987, and Adrian was a senior defender at George Mason in 1990.

At the time of his death, he had just received a green card and had planned to marry a German woman named Claudia Franke in October 1991.
