= George Ley =

English footballer (1946–2026)

Personal information
- Full name: Oliver Albert George Ley
- Date of birth: 7 April 1946
- Place of birth: Exminster, England
- Date of death: 22 April 2026 (aged 80)
- Place of death: Tiverton, Devon, England
- Positions: Forward; defender

Senior career*
Years	Team	Apps	(Gls)
1963–1967	Exeter City		
1967–1973	Portsmouth	184	(10)
1973–	Brighton & Hove Albion		
–1976	Gillingham		
1974–1979	Dallas Tornado	124	(8)
1979–1982	Wichita Wings (indoor)	106	(21)
1983	Oklahoma City Slickers		

Managerial career
- Austin Sockadillos
- * Club domestic league appearances and goals

Oliver Albert George Ley (7 April 1946 – 22 April 2026) was an English footballer who played professionally in both England and the United States.

== Career ==
Ley played for Exeter City, Portsmouth, Brighton & Hove Albion and Gillingham between 1963 and 1976. Following his English career, Ley moved to the Dallas Tornado of the North American Soccer League. He was twice named to the NASL All Star second team as a defender. He then moved to the Major Indoor Soccer League and played for the Wichita Wings. In April 1983, the Oklahoma City Slickers of the second division American Soccer League hired Ley as a player-assistant coach.

Following his playing career, Ley turned to coaching. He served as the Luton Town head youth coach under manager Jimmy Ryan. He returned to the United States as the head coach of the USISL Austin Sockadillos. Later, he served as Director of Coaching for the River City Rangers from 1996 to 2003 in Austin, TX. He also served as Director of Coaching for the Crossfire Soccer Club in Round Rock, TX in 2009 and 2010.

== Death ==
Ley died on 22 April 2026, aged 80.
