= Jim McDonagh =

Footballer (born 1952)

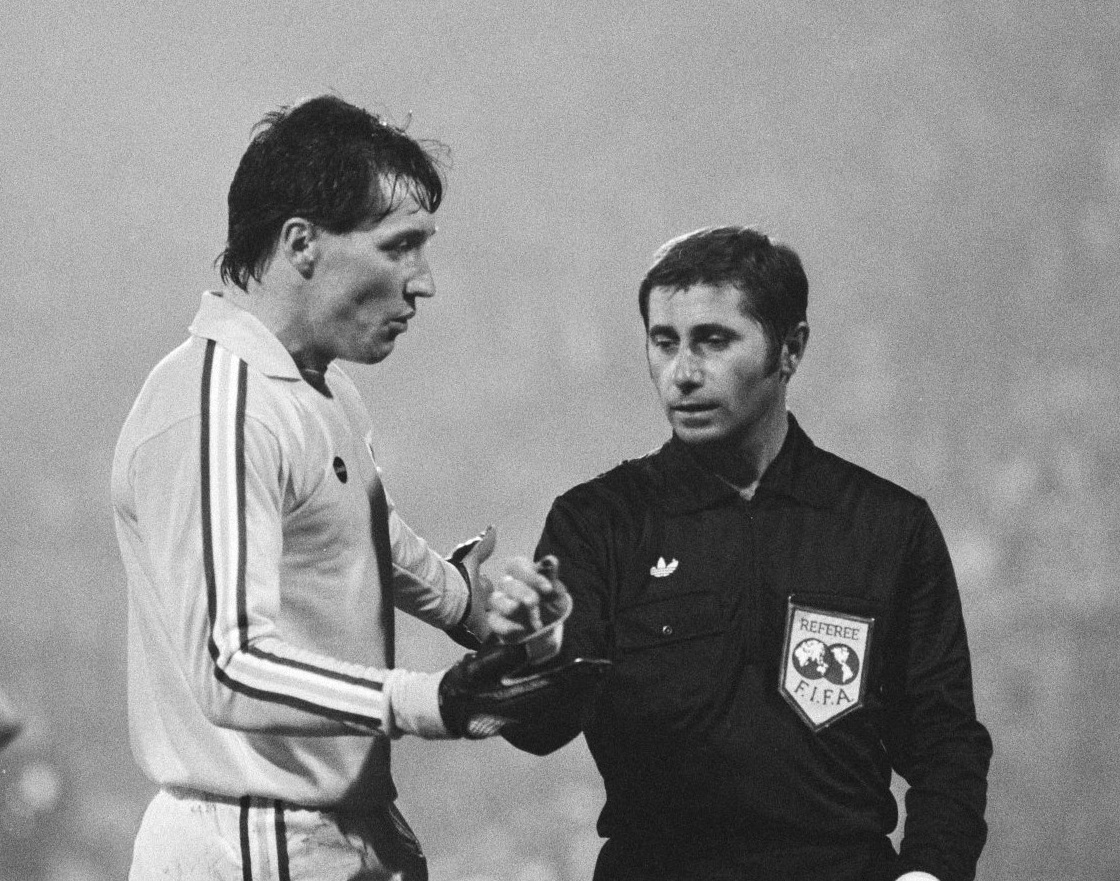
- Jim McDonagh with Vojtech Christov in 1981

Personal information
- Full name: Seamus Martin McDonagh
- Date of birth: 6 October 1952 (age 74)
- Place of birth: Rotherham, England
- Position: Goalkeeper

Team information
- Current team: Mansfield Town (head goalkeeping coach)

Senior career*
Years	Team	Apps	(Gls)
1970–1976	Rotherham United	121	(0)
1973	→ Manchester United (loan)	0	(0)
1976–1980	Bolton Wanderers	161	(0)
1980–1981	Everton	40	(0)
1981–1983	Bolton Wanderers	81	(1)
1983–1985	Notts County	35	(0)
1984	→ Birmingham City (loan)	1	(0)
1985	→ Gillingham (loan)	10	(0)
1985	→ Sunderland (loan)	7	(0)
1985–1987	Wichita Wings (indoor)		
1987	Scarborough	9	(0)
1987–1988	→ Huddersfield Town (loan)	6	(0)
1988–1989	Charlton Athletic	0	(0)
1988–1989	Galway United	20	(0)
1989–1990	Spalding United		
1990	Grantham Town	1	(0)
1990–1991	Telford United	6	(0)
1991–1993	Grantham Town		
1993–1994	Arnold Town	9	(0)
Total		507	(1)

International career
1971	England Youth	1	(0)
1981–1985	Republic of Ireland	25	(0)

Managerial career
- 1988–1989: Galway United
- * Club domestic league appearances and goals

Seamus Martin McDonagh (born 6 October 1952), known as Jim McDonagh, is a former professional footballer who played as a goalkeeper. He made more than 400 appearances in the English leagues. He played for his native England at youth level before winning 25 caps for Ireland. He then became a goalkeeping coach, working with numerous clubs in the English game until joining Martin O'Neill's coaching team at Sunderland in 2011. In November 2013 he was appointed to the same role with the Republic of Ireland national team by O'Neill, and in 2019 he followed O'Neill to Nottingham Forest as head goalkeeping coach.

== Playing career ==
McDonagh started his career at his hometown club Rotherham United, and spent a month on loan at Manchester United in 1973, before joining Bolton Wanderers, initially on loan, taking over from the recently departed Barry Siddall. An ever-present during the Second Division Championship-winning side of 1977–78, he set a club record of conceding only 33 goals in a 42-match season. For the following two seasons in the top flight he was also an ever-present and did well enough for Everton to sign him for £250,000 when Bolton were relegated in 1979–80. Within a year Neville Southall had come through the ranks at Everton and McDonagh found himself back at Bolton. Another relegation followed in 1982–83, even with McDonagh managing to score a goal, and he moved on to Notts County for two seasons before wandering around a further six English clubs as well as teams in the USA. It was while he was at Bolton that he received the first of 25 caps for Ireland. He qualified to play for Ireland through his father Michael who came from Midfield, County Mayo.

== Coaching career ==
He was appointed player/manager of Galway United in 1988 when they were in the relegation zone. Despite helping save the club from relegation his contract was unilaterally terminated by United in May 1989.

McDonagh went on to have coaching positions at clubs including Coventry City, Mansfield Town, Nottingham Forest, Millwall, Rotherham United, Leicester City, Aston Villa, Plymouth Argyle and Hull City. He was appointed Sunderland's first-team goalkeeping coach by Martin O'Neill on 6 December 2011. O'Neill then appointed him to the same role with the Republic of Ireland national team in November 2013. On 21 November 2018, O'Neill and his backroom staff parted company with the FAI, and in January 2019, McDonagh followed O'Neill to Nottingham Forest as head goalkeeping coach.

== See also ==
- List of Republic of Ireland international footballers born outside the Republic of Ireland
