= Indio Gómez =

Argentine footballer (1955–2021)

Personal information
- Full name: Omar Hugo Gómez
- Date of birth: 3 October 1955
- Place of birth: Quilmes, Buenos Aires, Argentina
- Date of death: 4 May 2021 (aged 65)
- Place of death: Florencio Varela, Buenos Aires, Argentina
- Position: Midfielder

Senior career*
Years	Team	Apps	(Gls)
1974–1978	Quilmes Atlético Club		
1979	Newell's Old Boys		
1979–1980	Wichita Wings (indoor)	19	(28)
1979–1981	Dallas Tornado	42	(12)
1980–1981	Dallas Tornado (indoor)	5	(10)
1981–1982	New York Arrows (indoor)	40	(40)
1982–1986	Wichita Wings (indoor)	110	(72)
1986	Defensa y Justicia		
1987–1990	Quilmes Atlético Club		
1990–1991	Wichita Wings (indoor)	43	(21)

Managerial career
- 2000: Club Cerro Porteño PF
- * Club domestic league appearances and goals

Omar Hugo Gómez (3 October 1955 – 4 May 2021) nicknamed Indio (Indian) was an Argentine footballer, best known for his time as player for Quilmes Atlético Club (1974–1978) where he distinguished himself for his classic gambetas (Dribbling).

== Career ==
Gómez was champion of the 1978 Argentine Primera División tournament with Quilmes. During his career at the club, he ascended twice, one in 1975 to the Primera División and one to the Primera Nacional in 1986–1987. As manager, he worked with Club Cerro Porteño Presidente Franco in 2000 in Paraguay. He also played in Paraguay as well as other Argentine clubs, such as Newell's Old Boys and Defensa y Justicia. Gómez also took part in indoor football in the United States, playing in Kansas, Dallas and New York.

== Death ==
Gómez died from COVID-19 in Florencio Varela, Buenos Aires, on 4 May 2021, at the age of 65.
