= Chico Borja =

American soccer player-coach (1959–2021)

Personal information
- Full name: Hernán Borja
- Date of birth: August 24, 1959
- Place of birth: Quito, Ecuador
- Date of death: January 28, 2021 (aged 61)
- Height: 5 ft 11 in (1.80 m)
- Positions: Midfielder; forward

College career
Years	Team	Apps	(Gls)
1977–1980	NJIT Highlanders		

Senior career*
Years	Team	Apps	(Gls)
1981–1982	New York Cosmos	48	(12)
1981–1984	New York Cosmos (Indoor)	44	(36)
1983	Team America	17	(3)
1984	New York Cosmos	18	(5)
1984–1985	Las Vegas Americans (indoor)	28	(24)
1985–1987	Wichita Wings (indoor)	83	(84)
1987–1988	Los Angeles Lazers (indoor)	51	(48)
1988–1992	Wichita Wings (indoor)	119	(90)
1989–1990	→ Albany Capitals (loan)		

International career
1982–1988	United States	11	(3)
1992–1995	United States futsal		(9)

Managerial career
- 1994: Houston Hotshots (indoor)
- 1995: Houston Force
- ?–1998: Rockhurst Hawks
- * Club domestic league appearances and goals

Hernán "Chico" Borja (August 24, 1959 – January 25, 2021) was a soccer player and coach. He spent time in the several U.S.-based leagues including the North American Soccer League, Major Indoor Soccer League and the American Soccer League. Born in Ecuador, he earned eleven caps with the U.S. national team.

== Youth ==
Borja was born in Quito, Ecuador on August 24, 1959. His family immigrated to the United States when he was 14 years old and resided in Belleville, New Jersey, where he played prep soccer at Belleville High School.

He attended New Jersey Institute of Technology (NJIT), where Borja played on the men's soccer team. At that time, NJIT played in the NCAA Division III. In 1980, his senior year, Borja was selected as a Division I First Team All American, the first NJIT men's soccer player to be named an All American. He finished his career with multiple entries in the NCAA record books for both single game and season scoring. In 1989, New Jersey Institute of Technology inducted Borja, a 1981 graduate, into its Hall of Fame.

== NASL ==
Borja began his professional career as a midfield winger with the New York Cosmos of the North American Soccer League in 1981. In his first two years with the team, he played in two NASL championship games, losing the first and winning the second in 1982.

In 1983, the U.S. Soccer Federation, in coordination with the NASL, entered the U.S. national team, known as Team America, into the NASL as a league franchise. The team drew on U.S. citizens playing in the NASL, Major Indoor Soccer League and American Soccer League. Borja left the Cosmos and signed with Team America. When Team America finished the 1983 season with a 10–20 record, the worst in the NASL, USSF withdrew the team from the league. Borja returned to the Cosmos for the 1984 season. Although the Cosmos failed dismally, not making the playoffs, Borja's play earned him a place on the NASL North American all-star team that year. He finished his NASL career with 83 games, 20 goals and 24 assists. One of his scoring highlights came in a 1984 Cosmos 3–2 victory over Argentinos Juniors.

== MISL ==
After the Cosmos folded, Borja joined the Las Vegas Americans of Major Indoor Soccer League (MISL). He played a single season with the team before it was expelled from the league on July 17, 1985.

From Las Vegas, Borja, moved to the Wichita Wings for two seasons, 1986–1987 and 1987–1988 before his transfer to the Los Angeles Lazers. He was with L.A. for a single season, then returned to Wichita, with whom he remained until his retirement in 1992. He was named the MISL Pass Master (season assist leader) for the 1988–1989 season. In 1989 and 1990, Borja played on loan during the summer with the Albany Capitals of the American Soccer League.

Borja retired from the MISL eighth on the career points list (612 points) and fourth on the career assists list (338 assists). Throughout his indoor career, he was a constant scoring threat. However, he was also noted for his lack of reluctance to get physical which led to numerous penalties.

== National and Olympic teams ==
Borja began playing for the United States men's national soccer team in 1982. He finished his playing career with eleven caps and three goals. His first game was the lone U.S. game of 1982, a 2–1 win over Trinidad and Tobago on March 21, 1982. In 1983, the U.S. played only one game, a 2–0 win over Haiti on April 8. Borja scored the second U.S. goal of the match. In 1985, he played two World Cup qualification matches, scoring a goal in a 2–1 victory over Trinidad and Tobago. He finished his national team career in a scoreless World Cup qualification game with Jamaica on July 24, 1988, when he came on for Bruce Murray in the 61st minute.

In 1984, Borja was called up for the U.S. Olympic soccer team which competed at the 1984 Summer Olympics. Borja played all three games as the U.S. ran to a 1-1-1 record in group play, failing to qualify for the second round. While the U.S. fielded its full international team at the Olympics, these games do not count as national team games as FIFA did not recognize them as full internationals. Borja was also on the U.S. team at the 1987 Pan American Games.

While Borja retired from professional soccer in 1992, that year he played for the United States men's national futsal team which won the silver medal at the World Championship. Borja was selected to the tournament first team. He continued to play on the U.S. Futsal team until 1995, scoring a total of 9 goals, placing him in the top ten list of U.S. futsal players.

== Coaching ==
After retiring from playing, Borja joined the coaching ranks. He began with the Houston Hotshots of the Continental Indoor Soccer League in 1994 and the Houston Force for their one competitive game in 1995. The Force folded after that single game. He also coached high school girls' soccer in Houston. He was on the National Soccer Coaches Association of America (NSCAA) National Staff and coached the Renegade Elite in Florida. Prior to 2012, he coached boys' soccer and girls' and boys' golf at Coral Glades High School in Coral Springs, Florida. He was also an Assistant Principal at South Plantation High School in Plantation, Florida.
