= Renato Cila =

Brazilian footballer

Personal information
- Date of birth: November 23, 1951 (age 74)
- Place of birth: São Paulo, Brazil
- Height: 5 ft 7 in (1.70 m)
- Position: Defender

Senior career*
Years	Team	Apps	(Gls)
1977–1978	Montreal Castors		
1978–1982	New York Arrows (indoor)	118	(24)
1979–1980	Rochester Lancers	32	(0)
1980	New England Tea Men	4	(0)
1982–1983	Baltimore Blast (indoor)	16	(3)
1983–1984	New York Arrows (indoor)	45	(2)
Total		215	(29)
- * Club domestic league appearances and goals

Renato Cila is a retired Brazilian professional soccer defender who played in both the North American Soccer League and Major Indoor Soccer League.

Cila signed with Corinthians when he was 17. He also played for Atletico Madrid, and Espinho before moving to Toronto and Montreal Castors to play in the National Soccer League. In 1978, Cila signed with the New York Arrows of the Major Indoor Soccer League. At the time, most of the Arrows also played for the Rochester Lancers of the North American Soccer League and Cila joined the Lancers for the 1979 outdoor season. On July 15, 1980, the New England Tea Men purchased Cila's contract from the Lancers then released him at the end of the season. In April 1981, Cila was given a league record fine of $5,000 and a thirteen-game suspension for striking an official during an Arrows playoff game. In 1982, the Baltimore Blast signed Cila, but he was back with the Arrows for the 1983-1984 season.

His son is former Major League Soccer player Jordan Cila.
