= Kevin Kewley =

English football player and coach (born 1955)

Personal information
- Date of birth: 2 March 1955 (age 71)
- Place of birth: Liverpool, England
- Height: 5 ft 10 in (1.78 m)
- Position: Midfielder

Youth career
- 1970–1976: Liverpool

Senior career*
Years	Team	Apps	(Gls)
1976–1978	Liverpool	1	(0)
1976	→ Dallas Tornado (loan)	24	(6)
1977	→ Dallas Tornado (loan)	26	(7)
1978–1979	Dallas Tornado	45	(3)
1979–1989	Wichita Wings	360	(113)
Total		456	(129)

Managerial career
- 1991–2001: Wichita Wings
- Pratt Community College
- Barton Community College
- * Club domestic league appearances and goals

Kevin Kewley (born 2 March 1955) is an English former professional football player and coach.

Active in England and the United States, he played as a midfielder and made over 450 career appearances, scoring over 120 goals. After retiring as a player, he was active as a coach at both college and professional levels.

== Playing career ==
Born in Liverpool, Kewley signed for Liverpool in 1970, turning professional in March 1972. He made one first-team appearance for Liverpool, appearing as a substitute in January 1978. He spent loan spells in the United States with the Dallas Tornado in the 1976 and 1977 seasons, later signing permanently with them. He later played for the Wichita Wings.

== Coaching career ==
After coaching the Wichita Wings, Kewley later also coached Pratt Community College and Barton Community College. He was the 2015 KJCCC's Coach of the Year.
