= Zoltán Tóth =

Zoltán Tóth may refer to:

- Zoltán Tóth (figure skater) (born 1979), Hungarian figure skater at two Winter Olympics
- Zoltán Tóth (footballer, born 1955)
- Zoltán Tóth (footballer, born 1983)
