= Dave Phillips (soccer) =

Dave Phillips (born April 2, 1961 Kansas City, Mo) was the general manager of the Wichita Wings indoor soccer team from 1996 to 1998. Phillips started his career in broadcasting as an overnight radio host on WREN in Topeka, KS, in 1981. He then moved to host the morning radio show with Jess Huxman in 1982. In 1985, Phillips moved to Wichita, KS to host the morning show on KNSS radio.

The team's 4-5 record in the post season makes Phillips the GM with the highest playoff winning percentage in the teams 22-year history. Phillips and coach Kim Roentved were fired following the 1998 season, which saw the team advance to the conference finals for the first time in 18 years. The team would not win another playoff series and folded three years later.

Phillips returned to his public relations and advertising roots in working at Sasnak Management in 2002. In 2020 he was inducted into the Wichita Sports Hall of Fame.
