= Cris Vaccaro =

American soccer player and coach

Personal information
- Date of birth: October 3, 1958 (age 68)
- Place of birth: Camden, New Jersey, United States
- Position: Goalkeeper

College career
Years	Team	Apps	(Gls)
- MCCC Vikings
- Baltimore Bees

Senior career*
Years	Team	Apps	(Gls)
1980	Seattle Sounders	0	(0)
1980–1981	Baltimore Blast (indoor)	7	(0)
1981–1982	New Jersey Rockets (indoor)	19	(0)
1982–1987	Cleveland Force (indoor)	149	(2)
1987–1988	Chicago Sting (indoor)	49	(0)
1988–1989	Wichita Wings (indoor)	40	(0)
1989–1991	Tacoma Stars (indoor)	118	(0)
1991	Penn-Jersey Spirit	11	(0)
1991–1992	Baltimore Blast (indoor)	36	(1)
1992–1997	Baltimore Blast (indoor)	132	(0)

International career
1988–1995	Puerto Rico		

Managerial career
- 1994–1997: Baltimore Spirit (assistant)
- 1995–2000: Puerto Rico
- 1999–2000: Gloucester College
- 2000–2016: Stockton Osprey (assistant)
- 2019: Philadelphia Fury
- * Club domestic league appearances and goals

Cris Vaccaro (born October 3, 1958) is an American retired soccer goalkeeper who played professionally in the Major Indoor Soccer League, American Professional Soccer League and National Professional Soccer League, as well as internationally for the Puerto Rico national team. He was the head coach and technical director of National Independent Soccer Association club Philadelphia Fury.

== Player ==
=== Youth ===
Vaccaro's father was born in Argentina and his mother in Puerto Rico. He was born and grew up in New Jersey where he graduated from Camden Catholic High School in 1976. He then attended Mercer County Community College from 1976 to 1978 and the University of Baltimore from 1978 to 1980.

=== Professional ===
In 1980, the Seattle Sounders of the North American Soccer League signed Vaccaro, but he saw no first team games. In 1981, he signed with the Baltimore Blast of the Major Indoor Soccer League and played seven games. The Blast released him at the end of the season. In October 1981, he had a trial with the Philadelphia Fever, but was not offered a contract. He then attended a trial with the New Jersey Rockets, but again failed to gain a contract. However, the team told him that they would call him if any of the Rocket's goalkeepers were hurt. Two weeks later, Alan Mayer was injured and Vaccaro signed with the Rockets. At the end of the season, the Rockets traded Vaccaro to the Cleveland Force where he spent the next five seasons. On June 5, 1987, the Force sent Vaccaro to the Chicago Sting in exchange for Victor Nogueira. He was the Sting's starting goalkeeper for most of the season, but Vaccaro became a free agent and signed with the Wichita Wings during the summer of 1988. In September 1989, Vaccaro signed with the Tacoma Stars. The Wings filed a grievance, but the Stars won the appeal and kept Vaccaro's contract. He spent two seasons in Tacoma, but was released in July 1990 as part of cost reduction effort. Vaccaro rejoined the Stars in October and played the 1990–1991 season with them. In 1991, he returned to outdoor soccer with the Penn-Jersey Spirit of the American Professional Soccer League. In the fall of 1991, he signed as a free agent with the Baltimore Blast. In December 1991, he scored his league record seventh career goal. However, both the Blast and MISL collapsed in 1992. Vaccaro then joined the Baltimore Spirit of the National Professional Soccer League. He played five seasons with the Spirit before retiring in 1997.

=== National team ===
Vaccaro's mother and father retired to Puerto Rico. When Vaccaro visited them in 1987, he discovered the island had a national team. After meeting with the team's head coach, Vaccaro was offered a position on the team.

== Coach ==
In 1994, Vaccaro became an assistant coach with the Baltimore Spirit. From 1995 to 2000, he coached the Puerto Rico national football team. He was the head coach of Gloucester College in 1999 and 2000. In 2000, Stockton University hired Vaccaro as an assistant coach with the women's soccer team and goalkeeper coach for both the men's and women's soccer teams. In the years of 2012 and 2013, he coaches teams in Vineland, New Jersey. Currently he coaches two teams, with his U-17 boys team named national champs in Colorado in 2013. In 2019, he became head coach and technical director of Philadelphia Fury in the National Independent Soccer Association.
