= Keith Van Eron =

American soccer goalkeeper (born 1955)

Personal information
- Date of birth: November 17, 1955 (age 70)
- Place of birth: Brooklyn, New York, United States
- Height: 6 ft 1 in (1.85 m)
- Position: Goalkeeper

College career
Years	Team	Apps	(Gls)
–1976	Hartwick Hawks		

Senior career*
Years	Team	Apps	(Gls)
1977–1978	New York Apollo		
1978	Houston Hurricane	19	(0)
1978–1979	Cincinnati Kids (indoor)	23	(0)
1979–1980	Philadelphia Fury	22	(0)
1979–1981	Wichita Wings (indoor)	28	(0)
1981	Philadelphia Fever (indoor)	14	(0)
1981–1984	Baltimore Blast (indoor)	96	(0)
1984–1985	Las Vegas Americans (indoor)	18	(0)
1985–1988	Baltimore Blast (indoor)	69	(0)
- * Club domestic league appearances and goals

Keith Van Eron is a retired American soccer goalkeeper who played one season in the American Soccer League and three in the North American Soccer League. He also played the first eleven seasons of Major Indoor Soccer League, winning the 1984 championship with the Baltimore Blast. He was the 1986 MISL Goalkeeper of the Year.

== Player ==
Van Eron attended Hartwick College where he played soccer under Timo Liekoski. He had originally intended to play basketball at Hartwick, but joined the soccer team. He was a 1976 Honorable Mention (third team) All American. In 1977, Van Eron turned professional with the New York Apollo in the American Soccer League. He immediately proved his worth by being named a first team all star. The Apollos sold his contract to the Houston Hurricane, coached by Liekoski, of the North American Soccer League, two games into the 1978 season. He played nineteen games for an 8–11 record before the Hurricane acquired Paul Hammond from the Tampa Bay Rowdies. The team then benched Van Eron and went 1–8 under Hammond. That fall, he signed with the Cincinnati Kids of the newly established Major Indoor Soccer League. Although he played one last outdoor season, in the fall of 1980, he moved indoors permanently when he signed with the Wichita Wings. In January 1981, the Wings traded him to the Philadelphia Fever. He moved to the Baltimore Blast in the fall of 1981 and would remain with the team until 1988, except for one season with the Las Vegas Americans. In February 2008, he was inducted into the Baltimore Blast Hall of Fame.

== Personal ==
Van Eron currently owns a company which specializes in holding soccer camps for youth players.

The US release of Microprose Soccer (1988), probably the most popular soccer game for the Commodore 64 computer, was called Keith Van Eron's Pro Soccer. The decision came from MicroProse's co-founder Bill Stealey, who later purchased Baltimore Blast in 1992.

== Yearly Awards ==
- ASL First Team All Star: 1977
- MISL Goalkeeper of the Year: 1986
