= Jørgen Kristensen =

Danish footballer (born 1946)

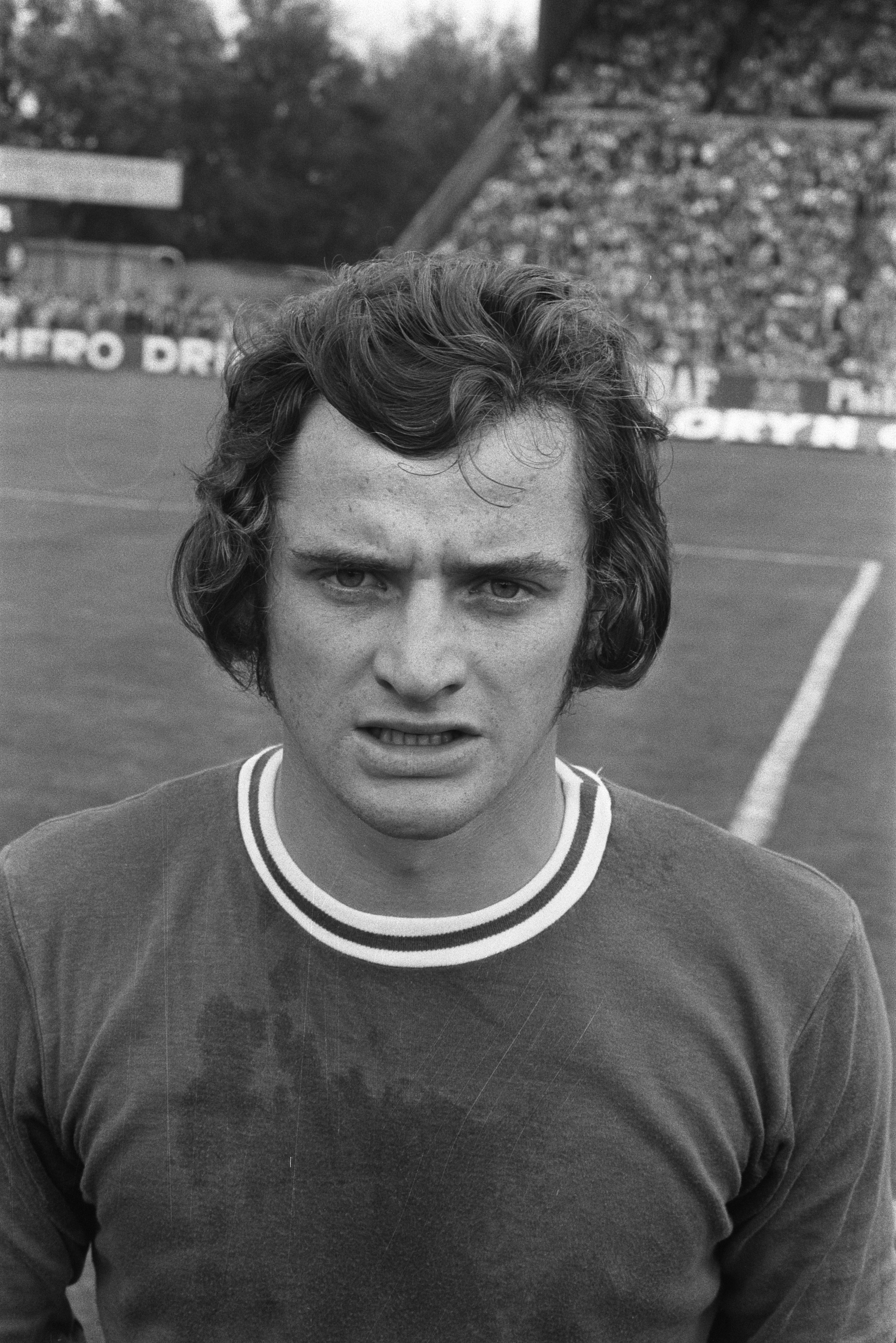
- Kristensen in 1971

Personal information
- Full name: Jørgen Kristensen
- Date of birth: 12 December 1946 (age 79)
- Place of birth: Hedehusene, Denmark
- Position: Winger

Youth career
- Hedehusene

Senior career*
Years	Team	Apps	(Gls)
1967–1968	Køge Boldklub	10	
1968	Detroit Cougars	27	(9)
1968–1972	Sparta	113	(12)
1972–1976	Feyenoord	134	(43)
1976–1978	Hertha BSC	45	(8)
1978	Næstved IF		
1978–1980	Chicago Sting	64	(12)
1980	Tulsa Roughnecks	11	(1)
1981	Calgary Boomers	28	(3)
1981–1986	Wichita Wings (indoor)	224	(74)
1986–1987	Kansas City Comets (indoor)	17	(5)

International career
1971–1978	Denmark	19	(3)
- * Club domestic league appearances and goals

Jørgen Kristensen (born 12 December 1946), nicknamed Troldmanden (the Wizard), is a Danish former football player who played professionally for a number of foreign clubs and won the 1974 UEFA Cup with Dutch club Feyenoord Rotterdam. He played as an attacking midfielder or winger, and was one of the most technical ballplayers in Danish football. He played 19 matches and scored three goals for the Denmark national football team.

== Biography ==
Born in Hedehusene, he started playing football with a local team. He moved to Køge Boldklub at the age of 20, where he played for a year, before moving abroad to play for American team Detroit Cougars. He joined Dutch club Sparta Rotterdam, for whom he made his debut for the Denmark national team in June 1971. He moved to Sparta's inner-city rivals Feyenoord Rotterdam, and was eventually dropped from the Danish national team in November 1972. He was a part of the Feyenoord team which won the 1974 UEFA Cup, but despite playing for a successful team, he was not recalled for the Danish national team. Partly because the national team had prolific attacking players like Henning Jensen, Ulrik le Fevre, Per Røntved and not least Allan Simonsen. And partly because Kristensen had trouble in getting the time off to travel home to Denmark to play for the national team.

He moved back to Denmark to play for Køge again, and was recalled for the Danish national team in August 1976. He moved abroad once more, to play for German team Hertha BSC in September 1976. With Hertha, he finished in third place of the 1976 German Bundesliga championship and reached the 1977 German Cup final. In 1978, he returned to Denmark, to play for Næstved IF. At the end of his Danish career, he moved to the United States to play indoor soccer, playing for Wichita Wings and the Kansas City Comets.
