= Erik Rasmussen (footballer) =

Danish footballer and manager (born 1960)

Personal information
- Full name: Erik Sandvad Rasmussen
- Date of birth: 24 December 1960 (age 65)
- Place of birth: Brøndby, Denmark
- Height: 5 ft 11 in (1.80 m)
- Position: Midfielder

Youth career
- Køge

Senior career*
Years	Team	Apps	(Gls)
1977–1979	Køge		
1980–1982	Herfølge		
1982–1984	Køge		
1984–1989	Wichita Wings (indoor)	217	(246)
1988–1989	Frem	36	(9)
1990–1991	Brøndby	73	(8)
1992	Helsingør	14	(10)
1992–1997	Køge	331	(113)
1998–1999	Wichita Wings (indoor)	56	(112)
1998–1999	Baltimore Blast (indoor)	37	(18)
1999–2000	Skælskør		

International career
1990–1991	Denmark	2	(0)

Managerial career
- 1992–1997: Køge
- 1999–2000: Skælskør
- 2000–2003: Næstved
- 2004–2008: Midtjylland
- 2009–2010: AGF
- 2012: Greve Fodbold
- 2017–2018: Vendsyssel FF
- * Club domestic league appearances and goals

Erik Sandvad Rasmussen (born 24 December 1960), nicknamed "The Wizard" and "TryllErik", is a Danish former footballer and manager. He played two games for the Denmark national football team. In March 2014 it was announced that he would be a 2014 inductee into the Indoor Soccer Hall of Fame.

== Player ==
During his active career, he was a forward for Danish clubs Køge, Herfølge, Frem and Brøndby. In 1984, Rasmussen moved to the United States and signed with the Wichita Wings of the Major Indoor Soccer League. He played five seasons for the Wings. In 1988, he was the league's points leader and was named the MISL MVP. In September 1989, but returned to Denmark and signed with Brøndby in order to make himself available to play for the national team. In January 1998, he returned to the Wichita Wings who were now playing in the National Professional Soccer League. He played for the Wings through the 1998–1999 season. In June 1999, he then moved to the Baltimore Blast.

== Coach ==
After retiring, he managed a number of Danish lower league clubs. In January 2004, he replaced Troels Bech as manager of Midtjylland in the top-flight Danish Superliga. In Midtjylland he led the team to a silver medal in the 2006–07 Danish Superliga. On 6 March 2008, he published he would leave Midtjylland at the end of the season for personal reasons. He took some time off going back to USA and with no active participation in football, except from being a pundit on Danish TV on some occasions. On 1 January 2009 he started as head coach for AGF. After a good start of the 2009/2010-season, AGF had a terrible spring that ended up in relegation to the Danish 1st Division. Four days after the season had ended Rasmussen was sacked.

In October 2012 he replaced Benny Nielsen as manager of Greve Fodbold on a contract running until the end of 2012.

In February 2017 he became new manager of Vendsyssel FF following a takeover of the club. He led the club to 2nd place in his first season, but failed to get the club promoted via play-off. He resigned on 8 May 2018.
