= Veljko Tukša =

Retired Yugoslavian association football player

Personal information
- Date of birth: 21 November 1950 (age 75)
- Place of birth: Zagreb, PR Croatia, FPR Yugoslavia
- Positions: Defender; midfielder

Senior career*
Years	Team	Apps	(Gls)
?–1974	NK Zagreb		
1974–1978	Dinamo Zagreb	44	(5)
1977	Toronto Metros-Croatia	15	(4)
1978–1984	New York Arrows (indoor)	183	(58)
1979	Olimpija Ljubljana	7	(0)
1979–1980	Rochester Lancers	40	(3)
1984–1985	Las Vegas Americans (indoor)	35	(7)
1985–1986	Pittsburgh Spirit (indoor)	24	(1)
1986–1988	Tacoma Stars (indoor)	70	(7)
- * Club domestic league appearances and goals

Veljko Tukša (known in the United States as Val Tuksa; born 21 November 1950) is a retired Yugoslavian association football player who played professionally in the North American Soccer League and Major Indoor Soccer League. He was the 1982 MISL Defender of the Year.

== Career ==
In 1979, Tuksa played for Toronto Metros-Croatia of the North American Soccer League. In 1980 and 1981, he played for the Rochester Lancers in the NASL. In 1978, he signed with the New York Arrows of the Major Indoor Soccer League where he would play every winter indoor season until 1984. He was the 1982 MISL Defender of the Year. In 1984, he moved to the Las Vegas Americans. When the Americans folded at the end of the season, the head coach Don Popovic moved to the Pittsburgh Spirit where he signed Tuksa. The Spirit folded at the end of the 1985-1986 season. In November 1986, the Tacoma Stars signed Tuksa. On 5 December 1987, the Stars released Tuksa. The team signed him at a reduced salary in January 1988, but he saw time in only eighteen games before being released.

== Yearly awards ==
- MISL Defender of the Year 1981-82
- MISL All-Star Team 1981-82, 1982–83
