= Joe Howarth (footballer) =

English footballer

Personal information
- Date of birth: 19 December 1954 (age 71)
- Place of birth: London, England
- Position: Defender

Youth career
- 1970–1973: SUNY Oneonta

Senior career*
Years	Team	Apps	(Gls)
1974–1976	New Jersey Brewers		
1976–1979	California Sunshine		
1979–1982	Wichita Wings (indoor)		
1980	Cleveland Cobras	79	(5)
- * Club domestic league appearances and goals

Joe Howarth (born 19 December 1954) is an English retired soccer defender who played professionally in the American Soccer League and Major Indoor Soccer League.

Howarth attended SUNY Oneonta where he was the first four-year captain of the soccer team. He was a 1971 and 1973 Honorable Mention All American and four-time All NY State. He was later inducted into the school's Athletic Hall of Fame. After graduating with a bachelor's degree in psychology in 1974, he was drafted by the Philadelphia Atoms of the North American Soccer League and the New Jersey Brewers of the American Soccer League. He played three years for the New Jersey Brewers. In 1976, he signed for the California Sunshine of the ASL and played for three years during the summer seasons. In 1979, he signed with the Wichita Wings of the Major Indoor Soccer League and remained with them until 1982. He played for the Cleveland Cobras of the ASL in 1980. During his professional career, he served as the Community Relations Director and Camp Director for each of the teams for which he played. He was the vice president of Marketing and Operations and TV and radio color commentator for the Wings. In 1990, he became the Wings' assistant General Manager.
