= Mike Dowler =

Welsh footballer

Personal information
- Full name: Michael Dowler
- Date of birth: 12 October 1957 (age 69)
- Place of birth: Caldicot, Monmouthshire, Wales
- Height: 5 ft 8 in (1.73 m)
- Position: Goalkeeper

Senior career*
Years	Team	Apps	(Gls)
1975–1979	Newport County	19	(0)
1980–1985	Wichita Wings (indoor)	194	(0)
1985–1989	Tacoma Stars (indoor)	91	(0)
1989–1991	Kansas City Comets (indoor)	28	(0)
1991–1992	Tacoma Stars (indoor)	39	(0)
1993	Denver Thunder (indoor)	9	(0)
1993–1996	Sacramento Knights (indoor)	67	(0)
Total		447	(0)
- * Club domestic league appearances and goals

Mike Dowler (born 12 October 1957) is a Welsh retired professional football goalkeeper. He spent most of his career in the U.S. indoor leagues where he was named the 1995 Continental Indoor Soccer League Goalkeeper of the Year.

== Biography ==
The son of a Welsh train engineer, Dowler began his career with Newport County in 1975. In the fall of 1980, Dowler moved to the United States and signed with the Wichita Wings of the Major Indoor Soccer League. He was a 1983-1984 second team All Star with the Wichita Wings. On September 26, 1985, he signed as a free agent with the Tacoma Stars. On February 1, 1986, he had reconstructive knee surgery which put him out until May 1987. He then injured his hand early in the 1988-1989 season, losing most of the season. On August 1, 1989, he signed with the Kansas City Comets. The Comets folded at the end of the season and the Stars picked him up for the 1991-1992 season. The Stars folded at the end of the season and Dowler found himself without a team until October. That month, the Dayton Dynamo lost their goalies during the pre-season. They then signed Dowler to a short-term contract. While he remained with the Dynamo as an "on call" backup goalkeeper, he never played a regular season game. In January 1993, he signed with the Denver Thunder of the National Professional Soccer League. He finished the season with the Thunder, then worked for a financial services company in Federal Way, Washington until signed by the Sacramento Knights of the Continental Indoor Soccer League on a two-game contract in August 1994. He won both games and was signed by the team for the remainder of the season. He then spent the next two seasons with the Knights before breaking his left arm with a month left in the 1995 season. He returned for the 1996 season, but suffered from several injuries including a sprained ankle at the start of the season and another broken left arm during the season. As a result of these injuries, Dowler retired at the end of the season. He currently employed as a lecturer.
