= Srboljub Stamenković =

Serbian footballer (1956–1996)

Stan Stamenkovic
Personal information
- Full name: Srboljub Stamenković
- Date of birth: 31 January 1956
- Place of birth: Titovo Užice, FPR Yugoslavia
- Date of death: 28 January 1996 (aged 39)
- Place of death: Užice, FR Yugoslavia
- Position: Forward

Senior career*
Years	Team	Apps	(Gls)
1973–1975	Sloboda Titovo Užice	62	(17)
1975–1981	Red Star Belgrade	44	(13)
1981–1983	Memphis Americans (indoor)	77	(101)
1983–1988	Baltimore Blast (indoor)	179	(130)
1994	San Jose Grizzlies (indoor)	8	(0)
Total		370	(261)
- * Club domestic league appearances and goals

Srboljub Stamenković (Serbian Cyrillic: Србољуб Стаменковић; 31 January 1956 – 28 January 1996) was a Yugoslav footballer. The most notable part of his career was spent in the United States playing indoor soccer for the Major Indoor Soccer League in Memphis and Baltimore. He was known professionally in the United States as Stan Stamenkovic.

== Career ==
Born in the town of Užice (then called Titovo Užice) in Serbia, he started playing for Sloboda Titovo Užice before signing with Red Star Belgrade in 1975 and stayed until 1981, when he was transferred to the Memphis Americans of the Major Indoor Soccer League. He played there for two seasons before going to the Baltimore Blast and stayed there until 1988, after helping the team win an MISL championship in 1984. He returned to Yugoslavia afterward to start his own business, a pizza parlor. He tried a comeback with the CISL's San Jose Grizzlies in 1994 but nagging injuries, which had prompted his earlier retirement, stopped this after 8 matches.

Stamenković scored 231 career goals and tallied 311 assists for a total of 542 career points. He is sometimes referred to as the greatest player in MISL history. In 1984, he led the league with 34 goals. His unique dribbling was perfect for the indoor game. At times he made the ball look like it was on a string. He could also find a streaking player, and thread the needle behind his back, as if he had eyes in the back of his head.

== Personal life ==
With his wife Vera, he had two children: a daughter named Jovana and a son named Nebojša who is a soccer coach.

== Death ==
Stamenković died after injuring his head in a fall on a sidewalk in Užice, just three days before his fortieth birthday.

== Awards ==
- MISL All-Star Team: 1982, 1983, 1984
- MISL Pass-Master (most assists): 1983, 1984
- MISL Top Points Scorer: 1984
- MISL MVP: 1984
