= Baltimore Blast (1980–1992) =

- Full name: Baltimore Blast
- Founded: 1980
- Dissolved: 1992
- Ground: Baltimore Arena; Baltimore, Maryland
- Capacity: 11,271
- Manager: Kenny Cooper
- League: Major Indoor Soccer League
colours

The Baltimore Blast were a longtime member of the Major Indoor Soccer League. From 1978 to 1980, the team played as the Houston Summit, but moved prior to the 1980–81 season. The team won the league's championship in the 1983–84 season. The team folded when the MISL ceased operation in the summer of 1992.

== History ==
The aggressive promotion of the team by radio partner WFBR (then 1300 AM) was instrumental in the Blast's popularity. Art Sinclair and Charley Eckman handled the play-by-play. WFBR would broadcast nearly all of the Blast's matches until the last few seasons, when they switched to WCBM. They would appear on television with WMAR, WJZ-TV, Home Team Sports and WBFF respectively.

The team was owned by Bernie Rodin, who also owned the Rochester Lancers and the New York Arrows. Mike Zolotorow was the long-time Equipment Manager for 20 years.

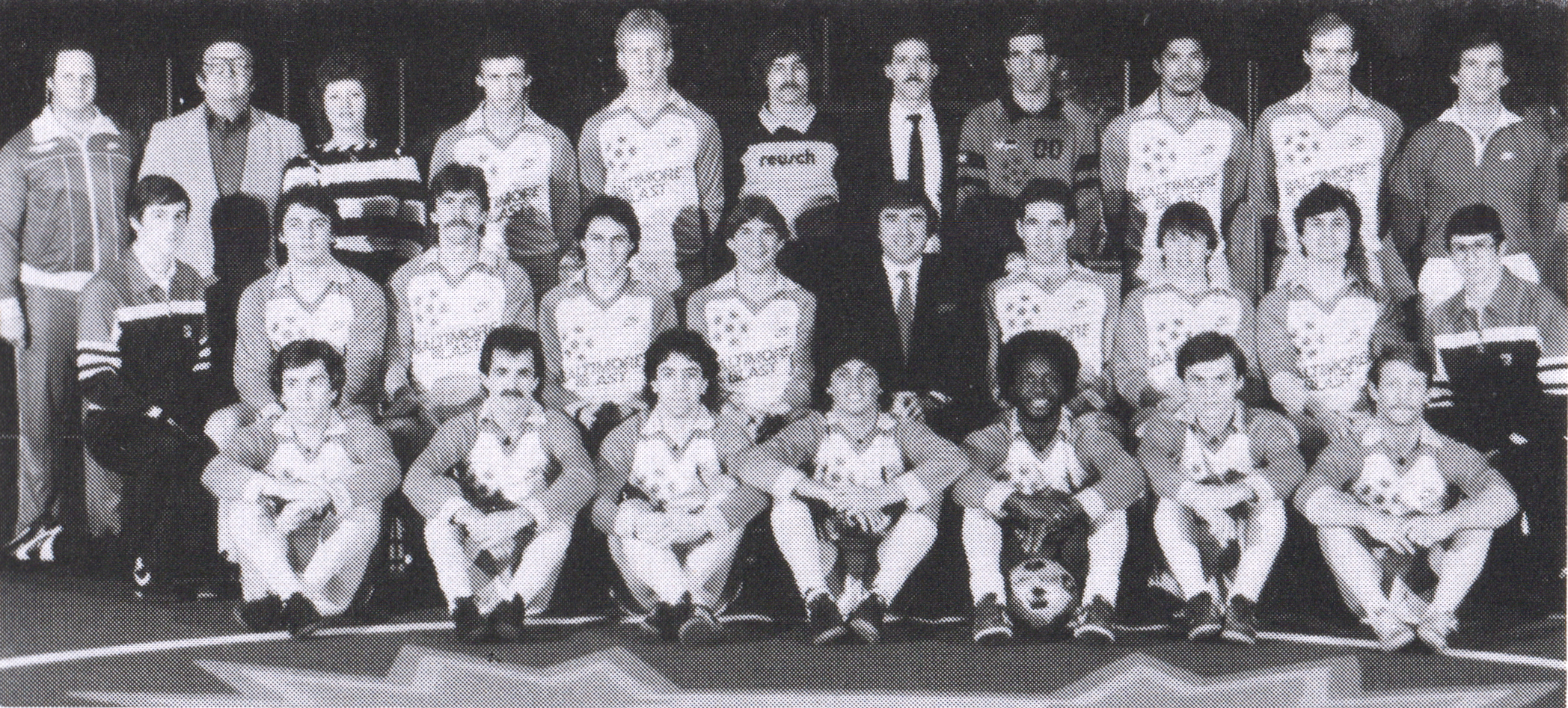
The 1983–84 championship team

In the 1983–84 playoffs, Baltimore advanced to the championship series by defeating the New York Arrows 3–1 in the quarterfinal best-of-five series, then beating the Cleveland Force 3–0 in the semifinal series. In the best-of-seven championship series, Baltimore defeated the St. Louis Steamers 4–1 to claim the 1984 MISL championship.

In 1991, the Blast contested the Trans-Atlantic challenge, a one-off indoor soccer game at the Sheffield Arena in Sheffield, England. They beat English First Division team Sheffield Wednesday to win the trophy. Wednesday had American international John Harkes in their ranks. The game was the one and only occasion that Eric Cantona played for Sheffield Wednesday during his infamous trial.

== Year-by-year ==
| Year | League | Reg. season | Playoffs | Attendance average |
|---|---|---|---|---|
| 1980–81 | MISL | 2nd, Atlantic | Semifinals | 6,540 |
| 1981–82 | MISL | 3rd, Eastern | Semifinals | 9,557 |
| 1982–83 | MISL | 1st, Eastern | Finals | 10,729 |
| 1983–84 | MISL | 1st, Eastern | Champions | 11,189 |
| 1984–85 | MISL | 1st, Eastern | Finals | 11,051 |
| 1985–86 | MISL | 4th, Eastern | Quarterfinals | 10,189 |
| 1986–87 | MISL | 2nd, Eastern | Division Semifinals | 9,936 |
| 1987–88 | MISL | 4th, Eastern | Division Semifinals | 8,221 |
| 1988–89 | MISL | 1st | Finals | 8,170 |
| 1989–90 | MISL | 1st, Eastern | Finals | 8,530 |
| 1990–91 | MSL | 3rd, Eastern | out of playoffs | 7,432 |
| 1991–92 | MSL | 4th | Semifinals | 8,206 |

== Personnel ==
=== Head coach ===
- (England) Kenny Cooper 1980–1992

=== Players ===
- (Scotland) Robert Prentice 1981–1983

== Retired numbers ==
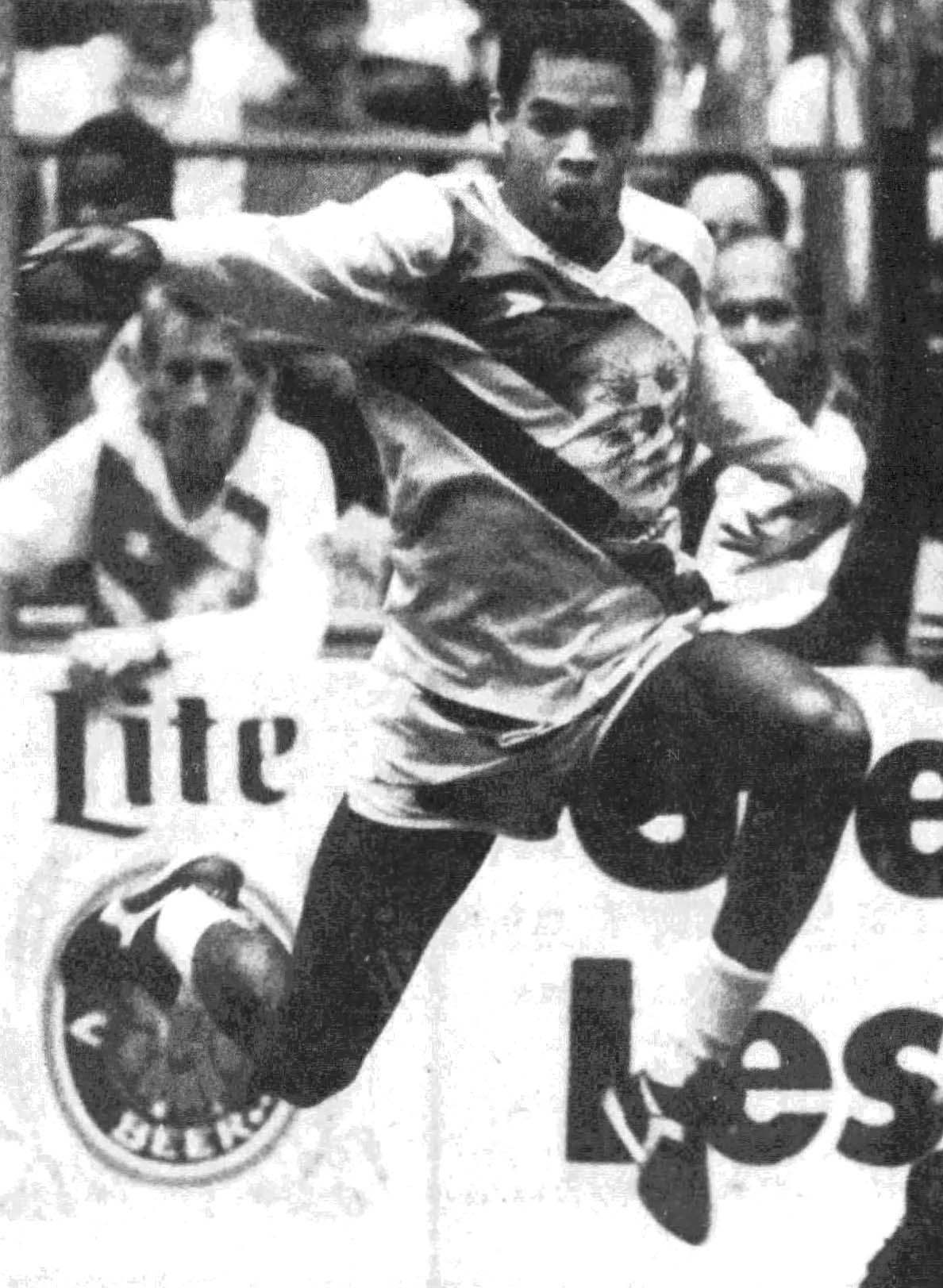
Mike Reynold's #3 was retired by the team

- 3 – (Canada) Mike Reynolds, 1986–91 (posthumous)

== Arenas ==
- Baltimore Arena (1980–1992)
