= Wichita Wings =

- Founded: 1979
- Dissolved: 2001
- Ground: Kansas Coliseum
- Capacity: 9,681

The Wichita Wings were a professional indoor soccer franchise based in Wichita, Kansas. The Wings were admitted to the Major Indoor Soccer League as an expansion team on August 21, 1979. They played in the Kansas Coliseum, a venue that featured a 200-by-85-foot (61 m × 26 m) field and seating for 9,681 fans.

When the MISL (which had since been renamed the Major Soccer League) folded in 1992, the Wings moved to the National Professional Soccer League. At the time the Wings folded, after the 2000–01 season, they were the oldest professional soccer franchise in the United States. Despite having some of the best records in US indoor soccer, the Wings never won a league championship or reached the league finals.

The team hosted the NPSL All-Star Game in 1996 and 1999.

A new team named after the Wichita Wings began play in the 2011–12 season and shut down after the 2012–13 season. They were in turn replaced by a new team called the Wichita B-52s who played in the Major Arena Soccer League.

Another version of the Wichita Wings was founded in 2019 and play in the Major Arena Soccer League 2.

== History ==
=== Founding ===
In 1978, Tom Marshall, a local youth soccer promoter with the American Youth Soccer Organization (AYSO), convinced the North American Soccer League's (NASL) Dallas Tornado to come to Wichita to play an exhibition game, with proceeds to benefit the local AYSO organization. On December 1, the Tornado squared off against the Houston Hurricane at the Kansas Coliseum. It was Roy Turner's last professional game. Over the next year, Marshall and other soccer enthusiasts, including Jackie Knapp, worked to find investors and bring a professional soccer team to Wichita. Bob Becker, the owner of Great Plains Corporation, an oil marketing operation, agreed to fund the new team. The newly christened Wichita Wings joined the Major Indoor Soccer League (MISL) in 1979, the league's second year of operation.

=== 1979–80: Inaugural season ===
Becker hired Roy Turner as head coach and brought in Ward Lawrence to help oversee operations. Tom Marshall became the Wings' general manager. On November 23, 1979, with only a week to go before the opening game, Marshall ceased to be a part of the Wings organization. The Wings and Marshall disagreed on the details of the separation, but it was to be permanent. Lawrence took over as general manager and Becker brought in Ray Denton to help run day-to-day operations. Mike Ivanow was to be the first signing, but the paperwork sent to his home misspelled his name. The delay resulted in Norman Piper becoming the first Wichita Wing. Piper was joined by the former Dallas Tornado and Liverpool player Kevin Kewley, who became the team's captain. Former Manchester United forward Jimmy Ryan and Argentinian player Omar Gomez anchored the team's offense. Roy Turner brought on George Ley as a player-coach. Later in the season, the team added former Manchester United winger Willie Anderson and forward Andy Chapman. Chapman had signed with Arsenal at age 16 and would become a fan favorite in Wichita, becoming the fifth leading scorer in Wings history. Ivanow was joined in goal by Keith Van Eron. Though Ivanow had US Olympic experience, Van Eron would end up playing more time in goal.

The Wings ended the season at 16–16, barely making the quarterfinals of the playoffs. The Detroit Lightning faced the Wings in that one-game playoff. A victory propelled the Wings into the semifinals, where they lost the first two games of a three-game series against the Houston Summit. In addition to the Wings' playoff loss, the city of Wichita was faced with the potential loss of the franchise. Owner Bob Becker announced that he would no longer be involved with the team and was attempting to sell the team. Fans and civic leaders began a campaign to sell season tickets for the next year, with hopes that this would help convince a new owner that the people of Wichita wanted to keep the Wings. On April 16, 1980, it was announced that Pizza Hut co-founder Frank Carney and a group of investors would buy the team. The Wings would return for a second season.

=== 1980–1986: Carney–Kentling era ===
Bob Becker's departure as owner brought wholesale change to the organization. Ward Lawrence, Ray Denton, and Jackie Knapp all departed. Frank Carney brought Bill Kentling with him from Pizza Hut to take over the role of general manager. Kentling had previously served as director of corporate communications at Pizza Hut and, prior to that, the vice president of the National Baseball Congress. Kentling brought in Steve Shaad as director of media relations, Dave Bennett as director of sales and marketing, and Virginia Creamer as director of operations to help run the team. Future KWCH sports director Bruce Haertl became the radio voice of the Wings on KFH radio.

On the field, the Wings looked to athletes from Denmark to help improve the team. Bundesliga veteran Jørgen Kristensen and a young Kim Røntved made a huge impact on the team. Kristensen would become the MISL Passmaster while Røntved was twice named MISL Defender of the Year and would become the Wings' all-time leader in goals scored. Mike Dowler from Wales secured the goalkeeper position after a battle with Keith Van Eron. Dowler would earn an MISL record four shutouts in his career with the Wings. The team's popularity increased in the 1980–81 season in part due to a controversy involving the San Francisco Fog's forward Mike Mancini. On December 28, 1980, in a Wings blowout win, Mancini punched Kristensen hard enough to drop him to the ground. The incident was televised, leading to a great deal of media coverage. Bill Kentling credited this incident with helping to improve attendance. That season was the beginning of the Wings' epic rivalry with the St. Louis Steamers. The Wings met St. Louis in the semifinals of the 1981 playoffs. In the third and decisive game, the Steamers came from behind to beat the Wings in a shootout. The game was marred by an ugly foul against Mike Dowler, sending him to the bench for the remainder of the game. Many considered it the greatest game in MISL history.

The 1981–82 season saw the Wings bring in two Englishmen that had a lasting impact on the team. Sheffield United alum Terry Nicholl became known as "The General" during his time in Wichita from his ability to coach on the field. Jeff Bourne was a potent scorer who had played in the English first division with Derby County. The Danish connection continued to bear fruit as the Wings added midfielder Frank Rasmussen to the squad. That year's Wings squad was very successful, finishing with a 27–17 record. Though the Wings defeated the Memphis Americans in the playoff quarterfinals, they once again fell to the Steamers in the semis. Off the field, a new force provided a strong backbone to the Wings' efforts: the Orange Army, a group of dedicated fans, followed the Wings wherever they went and met the Wings at the airport upon the team's return from every road trip.

Omar Gomez returned to the Wings for the 1982–83 season, after spending time playing for the New York Arrows. He would end the year second on the team in both goals and assists. Kim Røntved's older brother, Per Rontved, the former Danish national team captain, joined the Wings as well. Andy Chapman led the team in scoring with 48 goals. At 27–21 by season's end, the Wings finished second in their division, just ahead of the Steamers. They faced St. Louis again in the playoffs, this time in the quarterfinals. In game three, at the Kansas Coliseum, the Wings triumphed in a game with a variety of unusual events: Kim Røntved scored on a header from beyond 100 feet (30 m); Per Rontved made a 125-foot (38 m) shorthanded shot; and Steamer defender Steve Pecher scuffled with a Wings fan while in the penalty box, resulting in his ejection from the game.

St. Louis got revenge at the end of the 1983–84 season, sweeping the Wings in the semifinals. That year's squad featured a new arrival from Scotland: Ian Anderson. He led the team in blocks. Andy Chapman finished second in scoring in the MISL, with 53 goals. Kim Røntved was named the league's Defender of the Year. The team's finances were bolstered by excellent attendance, at 9,391 per game. The 1984–85 season was a disappointing one for the team. The Wings ended with a losing record of 21–26 and lost in the wild-card round of the playoffs. However, they added two players that would have a long-term impact. Terry Rowe was a talented defender from London, England. Danish sensation Erik Rasmussen earned his nickname, "The Wizard", from his dynamic abilities on the ball. He would become a record-setting player during his career with the Wings. In 1988, he earned the team's only MISL MVP award.

The 1985–86 season brought a change in goal. The departure of Mike Dowler to the Tacoma Stars resulted in a pair of new goalkeepers joining the Wings. Jan Olesen from Denmark and Seamus McDonagh from Ireland split goalkeeping duties. Olesen scored a goal in a game against the St. Louis Steamers: he dribbled the ball from his own goal to the other end of the field, kicking the ball between Slobo Ilijevski's legs. Englishman Barry Wallace, Scotsman Dave Hoggan, and Californian Mike Fox joined the team that season, as did former Las Vegas Americans player Chico Borja, nicknamed "The American Dream", who became a Wings player thanks to the dissolution of the Vegas franchise. Borja, playing the midfield position, would become the all-time Wings assist leader by the end of his career. Despite a 27–21 season, the Wings lost in the first round of the playoffs to the Tacoma Stars.

=== 1986–1992: Change is afoot ===
Big changes came to the front office and coaching staff in 1986. Francis Dale stepped down as commissioner of the MISL and the Wings' own Bill Kentling took his place. When Kentling went to the new league headquarters in New York City, it was decided that Roy Turner was the logical choice to replace him. Turner stepped down as head coach and was named president of the Wings. Frank Carney also decided to step down as managing general partner and was replaced by Bill Oliver Jr. Scottish player Charlie Cooke, the "Bonnie Prince", was brought in to replace Turner as coach. Cooke instituted an up-tempo style that emphasized defensive pressure. It was not always popular with the older veterans. In 1986–87, the Wings added the young forward Mark Kerlin from Arizona and the Welsh player Mickey Thomas, who had previously played for Chelsea and Manchester United. A rookie from California named Dale Ervine would have the biggest long-term impact. At the end of his eight years in Wichita, "The Bruin" would be second on the all-time goals scored list. The Wings lost in the division semifinals to Tacoma in 1987 after finishing the season with a 27–25 record.

In 1987–88, the Wings brought in Nenad "Ziggy" Zigante to replace Seamus McDonagh in goal. Former US Olympian Jean Willrich and longtime indoor pro Mike Stankovic also joined the squad in Charlie Cooke's second year. But it was a season that Cooke himself would not finish. On January 30, 1988, Cooke and assistant coach Norman Piper were fired after starting the year 11–16. Former Wing Terry Nicholl took over as head coach, with Kevin Kewley adding "assistant coach" to his duties on the field. Though the Wings had their worst ever season, finishing 23–33, two Wings ended up leading the MISL. Erik Rasmussen became the scoring champion and league MVP, while Zigante was named the league's Newcomer of the Year.

The MISL lasted until the end of the 1991–92 season, but Terry Nicholl's tenure as coach lasted only until February 1991. After a poor start to the season, he was replaced by original Wings coach Roy Turner. The Wings failed to achieve a winning record during those final years of the MISL. However, the team added several players that had positive, multi-year impacts on the team, including defender Tommy Soehn, midfielder Perry Van der Beck, former Derby County and Northern Ireland national team player Victor Moreland, Yugoslav midfielder Goran Hunjak, goalkeeper Kris Peat, and Baltimore Blast striker David Byrne.

=== 1992–2001: NPSL years ===
In 1992, after several years of struggling to keep franchises, the MISL folded. The Wings, under a new ownership group led by local businessman Mike Relihan, joined the National Professional Soccer League (NPSL). The player salaries were smaller and it lacked some of the large cities that the MISL was proud to include, but it provided the Wings a league in which to play. In 1996, Roy Turner left the team. Though the Wings had some success on the field during the NPSL years, their home attendance never equaled that of the 1980s. In 1998, Randy and Shirley Johnson took over as owners of the Wings. At the time the team folded in 2001, it was the longest-running soccer franchise in the United States.

== Ownership ==
	Title	Tenure
Bob Becker	Owner	1979–1980
Frank Carney	Managing general partner	1980–1986
Bill Oliver	Managing general partner	1986–1992
Mike Relihan	Managing partner	1993–1998
Randy and Shirley Johnson	Owners	1998–2001

== Management ==
	Title	Tenure	Ref
Tom Marshall	General manager	1979	
Ward Lawrence	General manager	1979–1980	
Bill Kentling	General manager	1980–1986	
Steve Shaad	General manager	1986–1987	
Roy Turner	President	1986–1996	
Hugh Nicks	General manager	1991–1992	
Dave Phillips	General manager	1996–1998	
Mike Ferguson	General manager	1998–2000	

== Coaching staff ==
Head coach	Tenure	Assistant coaches
Roy Turner	1979–1986	George Ley from 1979 to 1982 and Norman Piper from 1982 to 1986
Charlie Cooke	1986–1988 (27 games into 1987–88 season)	Norman Piper
Terry Nicholl	1988–1991 (33 games into 1990–91 season)	Kevin Kewley
Roy Turner	1991–1994	Kim Røntved
Kim Røntved	1994–1998	Kevin Kewley
Kevin Kewley	1998–2001	Sammy Lane

== Statistics ==
=== Wings league leaders ===
Wings MISL or NPSL yearly award winners
1980–81	Jørgen Kristensen	MISL Pass Master (most assists)
1983–84	Kim Røntved	Defender of the Year
1984–85	Kim Røntved	Defender of the Year
1987–88	Erik Rasmussen	Most Valuable Player
1987–88	Erik Rasmussen	Scoring Champion
1987–88	Nenad Zigante	Newcomer of the Year
1988–89	Hernan "Chico" Borja	MISL Pass Master (most assists)
1996–97	Jason Dunn	NPSL Rookie of the Year
1999–2000	James Dunn	NPSL Defender of the Year
2000–01	James Dunn	NPSL Defender of the Year

Wings MISL all-time regular-season career leaders
Category	Player	Rank	Record
Points	Hernan "Chico" Borja	#8	612
Goals	Andy Chapman	#8	307
Assists	Hernan "Chico" Borja	#4 (tied)	338
Assists	Jørgen Kristensen	#10	271
Games played	Kim Røntved	#1	494
Games played	Andy Chapman	#5	444
Goalkeeper games played	Mike Dowler	#2	387
Goalkeeper games played	Cris Vaccaro	#3	374
Goalkeeper games played	Scott Manning	#3	353
Goalkeeper games played	Keith Van Eron	#8	249
Goalkeeper wins	Mike Dowler	#1	197
Goalkeeper wins	Cris Vaccaro	#2	196
Goalkeeper wins	Scott Manning	#4	171
Goalkeeper wins	Keith Van Eron	#8	139
Goals against average (min. 9,500 minutes played)	David Brcic	#5	4.21
Goals against average (min. 9,500 minutes played)	Keith Van Eron	#10	4.3979

=== Wings all-time leaders ===
Wings all-time career goals
Rank	Player	Record
#1	Erik Rasmussen	358
#2	Kim Røntved	309
#3	Dale Ervine	305
#4	Chico Borja	266
#5	Andy Chapman	221

Wings all-time career assists
Rank	Player	Record
#1	Chico Borja	345
#2	Kim Røntved	344
#3	Jorgen Kristensen	261
#4	Erik Rasmussen	256
#5	Dale Ervine	162

Wings all-time career blocked shots
Rank	Player	Record
#1	Kim Røntved	678
#2	Terry Rowe	411
#3	Tommy Soehn	353
#4	Kevin Kewley	275
#5	Victor Moreland	220

Wings all-time goalkeeper saves
Rank	Player	Saves
#1	Mike Dowler	2,973
#2	Kris Peat	2,914
#3	Chris Damico	1,361
#4	Seamus McDonagh	998
#5	Ziggy Zigante	501

Wings all-time goalkeeper winning percentage
Rank	Player	%
#1	Cris Vaccaro	61.1%
#2	Mike Dowler	56.3%
#3	Seamus McDonagh	54.7%
#4	Chris Damico	53.6%
#5	Kris Peat	52.3%

Wings all-time season leaders
Category	Player	Record	Season
Goals Scored	Erik Rasmussen	75	1998-99
Assists	Erik Rasmussen	57	1987-88
Blocked Shots	Chico Moreira	92	1990-91
Game-Winning Goals (tie)	Erik Rasmussen	9	1985-86
Game-Winning Goals (tie)	Chico Borja	9	1986-87
Power Play Goals	Erik Rasmussen	16	1985-86/1987-88
Goalkeeper Saves	Mike Dowler	695	1981-82
Goalkeeper Winning Percentage	Kris Peat	73.3%	1992-93

=== Wings team record and attendance: 1979-2001 ===
Year	Division	Record	Playoffs	Average home attendance
Major Indoor Soccer League (MISL)
1979–80	Central	16–16	Semifinals: Houston defeated Wichita in 2 games 5–4(OT), 4–3	3,851
1980–81	Western	23–17	Semifinals: St. Louis defeated Wichita 8–7(SO)	5,825
1981–82	Western	27–17	Semifinals: St. Louis defeated Wichita in 3 games 10–5, 6–7(OT), 4–1	7,301
1982–83	Western	27–21	Semifinals: San Diego defeated Wichita in 3 games 8–5, 5–2, 4–3	8,341
1983–84	Western	25–23	Semifinals: St. Louis defeated Wichita in 3 games 4–3, 7–6, 5–4(OT)	9,034
1984–85	Western	21–26	Wildcard: Minnesota defeated Wichita in 3 games 2–1, 3–8, 3–2(OT)	8,710
1985–86	Western	27–21	Quarterfinals: Tacoma defeated Wichita in 4 games 5–6, 5–4, 5–4(OT), 3–2	8,447
1986–87	Western	27–25	Division Semifinals: Tacoma defeated Wichita in 5 games 9–7, 9–1, 3–10, 2–6, 4–2	8,069
1987–88	Western	23–33	did not qualify	9,003
1988–89	N/A	23–25	Semifinals: Baltimore defeated Wichita in 6 games 5–4(OT), 6–4, 6–4, 3–6, 5–7, 11–1	8,635
1989–90	Eastern	26–26	Division Semifinals: Kansas City defeated Wichita in 4 games 5–4, 4–3, 3–4, 5–4	7,445
1990–91	Eastern	21–31	Division Semifinals: Kansas City defeated Wichita in 2 games 6–0, 9–8	6,309
1991–92	N/A	18–22	did not qualify	8,206
National Professional Soccer League (NPSL)
1992–93	National	27–13	Quarterfinals: St. Louis defeated Wichita in 2 games 17–15(OT), 18–16(OT)	5,516
1993–94	National	22–18	First Round: Detroit defeated Wichita in 2 games 15–14, 19–16	6,672
1994–95	National	17–23	did not qualify	5,817
1995–96	National	20–20	Division Semifinals: Kansas City defeated Wichita in 2 games 10–9, 11–9	5,075
1996–97	Midwest	24–16	Conference Quarterfinals: Kansas City defeated Wichita in 3 games 13–11, 13–14, 22–5	5,210
1997–98	Midwest	22–18	Conference Finals: St. Louis defeated Wichita in 4 games 17–9, 10–8, 21–14, 19–11	5,426
1998–99	Midwest	18–22	Conference Quarterfinals: Kansas City defeated Wichita in 3 games 18–10, 14–16(2 OT), 21–10	3,602
1999–2000	Midwest	21–23	Conference Semifinals: Milwaukee defeated Wichita in 2 games 21–8, 9–6	3,573
2000–01	National	18–21	Conference Semifonals: Toronto defeated Wichita in 3 games	3,633
Wichita Wings folded after the 2001 season and the NPSL reformed as the Major Indoor Soccer League (II)

== Television and radio ==
The Wings appeared nationally on USA, ESPN, and CBS. Their first local television contract was with KSN-TV (NBC) and announcer Dave Armstrong in 1981–82. KSN continued to broadcast the Wings through the 1985–86 season. Other announcers included Craig Bolerjack, Mike Kennedy, and Steve Dennis. Former Wing Joe Howarth and director of media relations Steve Shaad, respectively, served as the color commentator for several of those seasons. KAKE-TV (ABC) took over the broadcast for the 1986–87 season. Mark Allan was their announcer through the 1988–89 season. The Wings had no television contract thereafter.

KFH Radio (1330 AM) broadcast the Wings from 1981 through 1986, with first Bruce Haertl and then Jim Hawley announcing. Steve Shaad, Blake Schreck, and Klaus Kollmai served as color commentators on the KFH broadcasts. In 1986, KRZ (1240 AM) took over the radio broadcasting, with Dave Phillips as announcer. As KNSS, they continued to broadcast the Wings through the 1989–90 season. Phillips was the voice of the Wings with KZSN (1480 AM) through the 1993 season. Steve Dennis took over KZSN's announcing duties in 1994 and continued through the transition to KFH in 1995–96. Former Wings goalkeeper Kris Peat served as announcer in 1996–97. In 1997, Rob Barzegar and KQAM (1480 AM) became the Wings radio broadcaster.

== Arenas ==
The Kansas Coliseum (Britt Brown Arena)

During home games in the mid- to late 1980s, the Wings used the "Gonna Fly Now" theme from the movie [Rocky] to celebrate Wings goals. For some time this music was also used for player introductions.
