= 1986–87 Dallas Sidekicks season =

Dallas Sidekicks
1986-87 season
- Owner: Sidekicks I, Ltd.
- Head Coach: (England) Gordon Jago
- Stadium: Reunion Arena
- MISL: 3rd (Eastern Division)
- MISL Playoffs: Won MISL Championship (vs. Tacoma Stars, 4-3)
- Average home league attendance: 8,637

The 1986–87 Dallas Sidekicks season was the third season of the Dallas Sidekicks indoor soccer club. The team was purchased in the off-season by a group of 37 limited partners under the banner Sidekicks I, Ltd. The team was purchased from Don Carter in order to prevent filing for bankruptcy. This season saw the team win the MISL Championship for the first time in franchise history.

== Roster ==
Note: Flags indicate national team as defined under FIFA eligibility rules; some limited exceptions apply. Players may hold more than one non-FIFA nationality.

No.	Pos.	Nation	Player
0	GK	USA	Billy Phillips
1	GK	USA	Mark White
2	DF	ENG	David Stride
3	DF	IRL	Victor Moreland
4	DF	CAN	Mike Uremovich
5	DF	USA	Mike Powers
6	MF	USA	Ed Radwanski
8	MF	ENG	Wes McLeod
9	FW	BRA	Tatu
10	FW	USA	Kevin Smith
11	MF	POR	Pedro DeBrito

No.	Pos.	Nation	Player
12	DF	TRI	Hayden Knight
14	FW	USA	Perry Van der Beck
15	FW	BRA	Marcio Leite
15	MF	HUN	Alex Tarnoczi
18	MF	CAN	Mark Karpun
19	MF	USA	Mickey Kydes
20	DF	USA	John Hedlund
20	FW	ENG	Howard Gayle
21	FW	COL	Willie Molano
22	FW	USA	Doc Lawson
31	GK	POL	Krys Sobieski

== Schedule and results ==
=== Preseason ===
Preseason (4–1)
#	Date	Away	Score	Home	Arena	Record	Attendance
1	October 18	Dallas Sidekicks	9-6	Memphis Storm	N/A Memphis, Tennessee	1-0	N/A
2	October 19	Memphis Storm	2-8	Dallas Sidekicks	N/A Memphis, Tennessee	2-0	N/A
3	October 24	Dallas Sidekicks	3-7	Wichita Wings	Kansas Coliseum	2-1	6,183
4	October 30	Wichita Wings	2-5	Dallas Sidekicks	Inwood Sports Center	3-1	300
5	November 7	Dallas Sidekicks	5-2	Kansas City Comets	Kemper Arena	4-1	N/A

=== Regular season ===
1986–87 regular season (28–24)

November (3-3)
#	Date	Away	Score	Home	Arena	Record	Attendance
1	November 13	Chicago Sting	3-6	Dallas Sidekicks	Reunion Arena	1-0	9,822
2	November 16	St. Louis Steamers	3-5	Dallas Sidekicks	Reunion Arena	2-0	7,309
3	November 21	Dallas Sidekicks	3-4	Cleveland Force	Richfield Coliseum	2-1	16,197
4	November 22	Tacoma Stars	5-3	Dallas Sidekicks	Reunion Arena	2-2	10,640
5	November 29	Dallas Sidekicks	3-2	Minnesota Strikers	Reunion Arena	3-2	6,298
6	November 30	Baltimore Blast	2-0	Dallas Sidekicks	Reunion Arena	3-3	5,141

December (5–3)
#	Date	Away	Score	Home	Arena	Record	Attendance
7	December 6	New York Express	2-6	Dallas Sidekicks	Reunion Arena	4-3	8,770
8	December 12	Los Angeles Lazers	4-6	Dallas Sidekicks	Reunion Arena	5-3	6,323
9	December 14	Tacoma Stars	1-4	Dallas Sidekicks	Reunion Arena	6-3	4,372
10	December 20	Dallas Sidekicks	2-4	San Diego Sockers	San Diego Sports Arena	6-4	8,655
11	December 21	Dallas Sidekicks	4-6	Los Angeles Lazers	The Forum	6-5	5,048
12	December 23	Cleveland Force	5-3	Dallas Sidekicks	Reunion Arena	6-6	6,053
13	December 26	Minnesota Strikers	2-6	Dallas Sidekicks	Reunion Arena	7-6	8,017
14	December 27	Dallas Sidekicks	9-4	Wichita Wings	Kansas Coliseum	8-6	8,408

January (9–2)
#	Date	Away	Score	Home	Arena	Record	Attendance
15	January 2	Dallas Sidekicks	8-4	New York Express	Nassau Coliseum	9-6	4,109
16	January 3	Chicago Sting	4-5	Dallas Sidekicks	Reunion Arena	10-6	8,316
17	January 7	Dallas Sidekicks	4-3	Kansas City Comets	Kemper Arena	11-6	10,471
18	January 10	New York Express	2-7	Dallas Sidekicks	Reunion Arena	12-6	10,558
19	January 14	Dallas Sidekicks	5-4	New York Express	Nassau Coliseum	13-6	2,776
20	January 16	Dallas Sidekicks	3-5	Cleveland Force	Richfield Coliseum	13-7	12,585
21	January 17	Wichita Wings	7-8 (OT)	Dallas Sidekicks	Reunion Arena	14-7	10,353
22	January 23	Los Angeles Lazers	0-2	Dallas Sidekicks	Reunion Arena	15-7	10,553
23	January 24	Dallas Sidekicks	2-6	Chicago Sting	Rosemont Horizon	15-8	8,006
24	January 28	Dallas Sidekicks	4-3 (2OT)	Minnesota Strikers	Met Center	16-8	4,847
25	January 31	Dallas Sidekicks	4-3	Tacoma Stars	Tacoma Dome	17-8	13,763

February (3–5)
#	Date	Away	Score	Home	Arena	Record	Attendance
26	February 3	San Diego Sockers	5-3	Dallas Sidekicks	Reunion Arena	17-9	5,525
27	February 7	Dallas Sidekicks	6-7 (OT)	Baltimore Blast	Baltimore Arena	17-10	10,014
28	February 13	Cleveland Force	6-4	Dallas Sidekicks	Reunion Arena	17-11	8,722
29	February 15	Kansas City Comets	1-6	Dallas Sidekicks	Reunion Arena	18-11	6,006
30	February 20	Dallas Sidekicks	3-2 (OT)	St. Louis Steamers	St. Louis Arena	19-11	7,983
31	February 22	Baltimore Blast	4-3 (OT)	Dallas Sidekicks	Reunion Arena	19-12	12,886
32	February 27	Dallas Sidekicks	5-6 (2OT)	Kansas City Comets	Kemper Arena	19-13	12,012
33	February 28	Minnesota Strikers	2-3	Dallas Sidekicks	Reunion Arena	20-13	14,854

March (4–5)
#	Date	Away	Score	Home	Arena	Record	Attendance
34	March 6	Dallas Sidekicks	4-5	Baltimore Blast	Baltimore Arena	20-14	11,323
35	March 8	Dallas Sidekicks	7-5	Chicago Sting	Rosemont Horizon	21-14	7,175
36	March 10	Wichita Wings	3-2	Dallas Sidekicks	Reunion Arena	21-15	7,806
37	March 13	Dallas Sidekicks	6-3	Wichita Wings	Kansas Coliseum	22-15	7,561
38	March 15	Chicago Sting	3-4	Dallas Sidekicks	Reunion Arena	23-15	10,036
39	March 20	Chicago Sting	7-2	Dallas Sidekicks	Reunion Arena	23-16	11,456
40	March 22	San Diego Sockers	2-4	Dallas Sidekicks	Reunion Arena	24-16	9,489
41	March 24	Dallas Sidekicks	0-8	Minnesota Strikers	Met Center	24-17	7,219
42	March 28	Dallas Sidekicks	3-6	Chicago Sting	Rosemont Horizon	24-18	7,219

April (4–5)
#	Date	Away	Score	Home	Arena	Record	Attendance
43	April 2	Cleveland Force	3-4 (OT)	Dallas Sidekicks	Reunion Arena	25-18	6,533
44	April 4	Dallas Sidekicks	6-3	Wichita Wings	Kansas Coliseum	26-18	9,432
45	April 10	Dallas Sidekicks	1-3	Tacoma Stars	Tacoma Dome	26-19	7,743
46	April 11	Dallas Sidekicks	4-3	San Diego Sockers	San Diego Sports Arena	27-19	9,946
47	April 14	St. Louis Steamers	4-1	Dallas Sidekicks	Reunion Arena	27-20	7,017
48	April 17	Baltimore Blast	4-2	Dallas Sidekicks	Reunion Arena	27-21	11,877
49	April 19	Dallas Sidekicks	3-5	Minnesota Strikers	Reunion Arena	27-22	6,139
50	April 26	Dallas Sidekicks	7-3	Baltimore Blast	Baltimore Arena	28-22	11,366
51	April 29	Dallas Sidekicks	2-4	Cleveland Force	Richfield Coliseum	28-23	10,213

May (0–1)
#	Date	Away	Score	Home	Arena	Record	Attendance
52	May 2	Dallas Sidekicks	2-3	Los Angeles Lazers	The Forum	28-24	6,991

Legend: Win Loss

=== Postseason ===
Eastern Division Semifinals (3–2)
#	Date	Away	Score	Home	Arena	Series	Attendance
1	May 7	Dallas Sidekicks	2-3	Baltimore Blast	Baltimore Arena	0-1	6,224
2	May 9	Dallas Sidekicks	7-6	Baltimore Blast	Baltimore Arena	1-1	7,306
3	May 15	Baltimore Blast	3-2 (OT)	Dallas Sidekicks	Reunion Arena	1-2	9,189
4	May 17	Baltimore Blast	3-4 (OT)	Dallas Sidekicks	Reunion Arena	2-2	5,149
5	May 21	Dallas Sidekicks	7-4	Baltimore Blast	Baltimore Arena	3-2	7,918

Eastern Division Finals (4–1)
#	Date	Away	Score	Home	Arena	Series	Attendance
51	May 23	Dallas Sidekicks	3-5	Cleveland Force	Richfield Coliseum	0-1	12,034
51	May 24	Dallas Sidekicks	9-6	Cleveland Force	Richfield Coliseum	1-1	13,051
51	May 27	Cleveland Force	2-5	Dallas Sidekicks	Reunion Arena	2-1	9,107
51	May 29	Cleveland Force	4-9	Dallas Sidekicks	Reunion Arena	3-1	16,824
51	May 31	Dallas Sidekicks	4-3	Cleveland Force	Richfield Coliseum	4-1	8,859

MISL Finals (4–3)
#	Date	Away	Score	Home	Arena	Series	Attendance
1	June 9	Dallas Sidekicks	4-10	Tacoma Stars	Tacoma Dome	0-1	11,496
2	June 11	Dallas Sidekicks	5-7	Tacoma Stars	Tacoma Dome	0-2	14,643
3	June 13	Tacoma Stars	3-5	Dallas Sidekicks	Reunion Arena	1-2	16,824
4	June 14	Tacoma Stars	5-6	Dallas Sidekicks	Reunion Arena	2-2	13,597
5	June 16	Dallas Sidekicks	3-5	Tacoma Stars	Tacoma Dome	2-3	20,284
6	June 18	Tacoma Stars	4-5 (2OT)	Dallas Sidekicks	Reunion Arena	3-3	16,824
7	June 20	Dallas Sidekicks	4-3 (OT)	Tacoma Stars	Tacoma Dome	4-3	21,728

== Final standings ==
Eastern Division
		GP	W	L	Pct	GB	GF	GA
1	y-Cleveland Force	52	34	18	.654	--	252	218
2	x-Baltimore Blast	52	33	19	.635	1	239	201
3	x-Dallas Sidekicks	52	28	24	.538	6	209	197
4	x-Minnesota Strikers	52	26	26	.500	8	205	198
5	Chicago Sting	52	23	29	.442	11	263	265
6	New York Express*	26	3	23	.115	--	97	159

y – division champions, x – clinched playoff berth, * - The New York Express folded midseason.
