= 1988–89 Dallas Sidekicks season =

Dallas Sidekicks
1988–89 season
- Owner: Sidekicks I, Ltd.
- Head Coach: (England) Gordon Jago (United States) Billy Phillips (after March 2)
- Stadium: Reunion Arena
- MISL: 3rd
- MISL Playoffs: Lost MISL Semifinals (vs. San Diego Sockers, 3-4)
- Average home league attendance: 8,567

The 1988–89 Dallas Sidekicks season was the fifth season of the Dallas Sidekicks indoor soccer club. The season saw the team make the playoffs for the fourth consecutive year. The team hosted the 1989 Major Indoor Soccer League All-Star Game at Reunion Arena, losing to the MISL All–Stars, 8-1. The team also hosted an international exhibition against the Russian team Lokomotiv Moscow. The Sidekicks won 6-2 and the attendance of 12,111 was the second highest that year for the team. Long–time head coach Gordon Jago was promoted to General Manager on March 2. Assistant coach Billy Phillips was promoted into Jago’s position.

== Roster ==
Note: Flags indicate national team as defined under FIFA eligibility rules; some limited exceptions apply. Players may hold more than one non-FIFA nationality.

No.	Pos.	Nation	Player
1	GK	USA	Hank Henry
2	MF	ENG	Terry Woodberry
3	DF	USA	Troy Snyder
4	FW	COL	Jorge Acosta
5	DF	USA	Mike Powers
7	MF	ITA	Gino DiFlorio
8	MF	ENG	Wes McLeod
9	FW	BRA	Tatu
10	FW	USA	Kevin Smith
11	FW	ENG	Godfrey Ingram
11	FW	NED	Marcel Loosveld

No.	Pos.	Nation	Player
13	MF	ENG	Michael King
14	MF	TRI	Richard Chinapoo
15	FW	BRA	Marco Leite
16	FW	USA	Eloy Salgado
18	MF	CAN	Mark Karpun
20	MF	BRA	Bruno Feretti
21	FW	COL	Willie Molano
22	FW	USA	Doc Lawson
25	MF	BRA	Beto
31	GK	POL	Krys Sobieski
32	GK	USA	Joe Papaleo

== Schedule and results ==
=== Preseason ===
Preseason (2-3)
#	Date	Away	Score	Home	Arena	Record	Attendance
1	October 8	Dallas Sidekicks	15-1	Houston Express	Houston Indoor Soccer Center	1-0	N/A
2	October 14	Dallas Sidekicks	3-4 (OT)	Baltimore Blast	N/A (Richfield, Ohio)	1-1	N/A
3	October 16	Dallas Sidekicks	3-0	SMU Mustangs	Ownby Stadium	2-1	4,135
4	October 22	Wichita Wings	8-5	Dallas Sidekicks	N/A Nashville, Texas	2-2	N/A
5	October 29	Dallas Sidekicks	2-3	Wichita Wings	Kansas Coliseum	2-3	N/A

=== Regular season ===
1988–89 Regular Season (24-24)

November (5-3)
#	Date	Away	Score	Home	Arena	Record	Attendance
1	November 4	Dallas Sidekicks	6-5 (3OT)	Tacoma Stars	Tacoma Dome	1-0	12,218
2	November 6	Baltimore Blast	6-3	Dallas Sidekicks	Reunion Arena	1-1	15,077
3	November 12	Dallas Sidekicks	2-5	Wichita Wings	Kansas Coliseum	1-2	9,520
4	November 13	Tacoma Stars	3-6	Dallas Sidekicks	Reunion Arena	2-2	7,117
5	November 18	Wichita Wings	5-8	Dallas Sidekicks	Reunion Arena	3-2	9,110
6	November 19	San Diego Sockers	2-1	Dallas Sidekicks	Reunion Arena	3-3	10,885
7	November 25	Dallas Sidekicks	8-6	Los Angeles Lazers	The Forum	4-3	5,182
8	November 27	Los Angeles Lazers	4-7	Dallas Sidekicks	Reunion Arena	5-3	7,101

December (5-3)
#	Date	Away	Score	Home	Arena	Record	Attendance
9	December 2	Dallas Sidekicks	4-3	Kansas City Comets	Kemper Arena	6-3	7,275
10	December 4	Baltimore Blast	3-2 (2OT)	Dallas Sidekicks	Reunion Arena	6-4	8,577
11	December 9	Kansas City Comets	2-6	Dallas Sidekicks	Reunion Arena	7-4	7,096
12	December 16	Tacoma Stars	5-6 (3OT)	Dallas Sidekicks	Reunion Arena	8-4	7,877
13	December 17	Dallas Sidekicks	3-7	Tacoma Stars	Tacoma Dome	8-5	5,796
14	December 27	Dallas Sidekicks	2-6	Wichita Wings	Kansas Coliseum	8-6	9,688
15	December 28	Los Angeles Lazers	4-5 (OT)	Dallas Sidekicks	Reunion Arena	9-6	9,199
16	December 30	Dallas Sidekicks	6-5	Baltimore Blast	Baltimore Arena	10-6	10,118

January (3-4)
#	Date	Away	Score	Home	Arena	Record	Attendance
17	January 6	Tacoma Stars	4-6	Dallas Sidekicks	Reunion Arena	11-6	9,559
18	January 7	Kansas City Comets	4-7	Dallas Sidekicks	Reunion Arena	12-6	12,197
19	January 13	San Diego Sockers	7-1	Dallas Sidekicks	Reunion Arena	12-7	10,006
20	January 15	Dallas Sidekicks	2-7	Kansas City Comets	Kemper Arena	12-8	8,530
21	January 21	Los Angeles Lazers	4-3 (OT)	Dallas Sidekicks	Reunion Arena	12-9	12,106
22	January 24	Wichita Wings	4-3	Dallas Sidekicks	Reunion Arena	12-10	6,024
23	January 28	San Diego Sockers	3-4 (OT)	Dallas Sidekicks	Reunion Arena	13-10	10,991

February (3-6)
#	Date	Away	Score	Home	Arena	Record	Attendance
24	February 3	Dallas Sidekicks	4-6	Baltimore Blast	Baltimore Arena	13-11	10,057
25	February 4	Wichita Wings	3-5	Dallas Sidekicks	Reunion Arena	14-11	9,118
26	February 7	Dallas Sidekicks	1-3	Wichita Wings	Kansas Coliseum	14-12	7,306
27	February 8	Dallas Sidekicks	0-4	San Diego Sockers	San Diego Sports Arena	14-13	6,486
28	February 15	Dallas Sidekicks	1-4	Baltimore Blast	Baltimore Arena	14-14	6,418
29	February 17	Baltimore Blast	3-2	Dallas Sidekicks	Reunion Arena	14-15	10,830
30	February 19	Dallas Sidekicks	4-3 (2OT)	Kansas City Comets	Kemper Arena	15-15	11,696
31	February 24	Dallas Sidekicks	2-8	San Diego Sockers	San Diego Sports Arena	15-16	8,845
32	February 25	Dallas Sidekicks	4-2	Los Angeles Lazers	The Forum	16-16	6,135

March (5-4)
#	Date	Away	Score	Home	Arena	Record	Attendance
33	March 4	Dallas Sidekicks	4-2	Los Angeles Lazers	The Forum	17-16	4,341
34	March 7	Wichita Wings	6-8	Dallas Sidekicks	Reunion Arena	18-16	5,377
35	March 15	Kansas City Comets	6-3	Dallas Sidekicks	Reunion Arena	18-17	5,719
36	March 17	Dallas Sidekicks	2-7	Wichita Wings	Kansas Coliseum	18-18	8,452
37	March 19	Dallas Sidekicks	3-4	San Diego Sockers	San Diego Sports Arena	18-19	6,830
38	March 23	San Diego Sockers	3-5	Dallas Sidekicks	Reunion Arena	19-19	6,868
39	March 25	Los Angeles Lazers	1-7	Dallas Sidekicks	Reunion Arena	20-19	7,064
40	March 29	Dallas Sidekicks	4-8	Tacoma Stars	Tacoma Dome	20-20	4,314
41	March 31	Dallas Sidekicks	4-3	Los Angeles Lazers	The Forum	21-20	5,533

April (3-4)
#	Date	Away	Score	Home	Arena	Record	Attendance
42	April 1	Dallas Sidekicks	3-4	San Diego Sockers	San Diego Sports Arena	21-21	9,136
43	April 6	Tacoma Stars	1-0	Dallas Sidekicks	Reunion Arena	21-22	3,227
44	April 8	Dallas Sidekicks	6-2	Baltimore Blast	Baltimore Arena	22-22	9,677
45	April 9	Kansas City Comets	1-2	Dallas Sidekicks	Reunion Arena	23-22	5,776
46	April 14	Baltimore Blast	3-4 (OT)	Dallas Sidekicks	Reunion Arena	24-22	8,646
47	April 15	Dallas Sidekicks	2-5	Tacoma Stars	Tacoma Dome	24-23	9,295
48	April 18	Dallas Sidekicks	3-8	Kansas City Comets	Kemper Arena	24-24	7,216

Legend: Win Loss

=== Postseason ===
MISL Semifinals (3-4)
#	Date	Away	Score	Home	Arena	Series	Attendance
1	May 3	Dallas Sidekicks	4-7	San Diego Sockers	San Diego Sports Arena	0-1	12,218
2	May 6	Dallas Sidekicks	5-4	San Diego Sockers	San Diego Sports Arena	1-1	9,289
3	May 12	San Diego Sockers	5-4 (OT)	Dallas Sidekicks	Reunion Arena	1-2	6,285
4	May 13	San Diego Sockers	3-7	Dallas Sidekicks	Reunion Arena	2-2	7,015
5	May 16	San Diego Sockers	1-4	Dallas Sidekicks	Reunion Arena	3-2	5,407
6	May 18	Dallas Sidekicks	2-7	San Diego Sockers	San Diego Sports Arena	3-3	7,664
7	May 20	Dallas Sidekicks	0-1	San Diego Sockers	San Diego Sports Arena	3-4	11,604

== Final standings ==
MISL
		GP	W	L	Pct	GB	GF	GA
1	x-Baltimore Blast	48	29	19	.604	--	215	208
2	x-San Diego Sockers	48	27	21	.563	2	218	168
3	x-Dallas Sidekicks	48	24	24	.500	5	185	206
4	x-Tacoma Stars	48	23	25	.479	6	208	207
5	x-Wichita Wings	48	23	25	.479	6	213	208
6	Kansas City Comets	48	21	27	.438	8	218	222
7	Los Angeles Lazers	48	21	27	.438	8	194	233

x – clinched playoff berth
