= 1989–90 Dallas Sidekicks season =

Dallas Sidekicks
1989–90 season
- Owner: Sidekicks I, Ltd.
- Head Coach: (United States) Billy Phillips
- Stadium: Reunion Arena
- MISL: 1st (Western Division)
- MISL Playoffs: Lost Western Division Finals (vs. San Diego Sockers, 2–4)
- Average home league attendance: 9,004

The 1989–90 Dallas Sidekicks season was the sixth season of the Dallas Sidekicks indoor soccer club. The season saw the team win their first division title in franchise history and make the playoffs for the fifth consecutive year. Not only was the team the best in the Western Division, it was the only team above .500. However, they were shockingly upset in the Division Finals by the eventual champion San Diego Sockers, the second consecutive year they eliminated the Sidekicks. On January 25, the team hosted the “Australian Select,” Australia’s best players in indoor soccer. The Sidekicks defeated them 7–3. The team’s 31 regular season wins were the most in a single season in franchise history.

== Roster ==
Note: Flags indicate national team as defined under FIFA eligibility rules; some limited exceptions apply. Players may hold more than one non-FIFA nationality.

No.	Pos.	Nation	Player
1	GK	USA	Hank Henry
2	MF	ENG	Terry Woodberry
3	DF	USA	Troy Snyder
5	DF	USA	Mike Powers
6	MF	YUG	Dali
7	FW	CAN	Roderick Scott
8	MF	ENG	Wes McLeod
9	FW	BRA	Tatu
10	FW	USA	Kevin Smith

No.	Pos.	Nation	Player
11	FW	ENG	Steve Kinsey
16	FW	USA	Eloy Salgado
18	MF	CAN	Mark Karpun
20	MF	BRA	Bruno Feretti
21	FW	COL	Willie Molano
22	FW	USA	Doc Lawson
24	GK	USA	Joe Papaleo
25	MF	BRA	Beto
31	GK	POL	Krys Sobieski

== Schedule and results ==
=== Preseason ===
Preseason (2–1–1)
#	Date	Away	Score	Home	Arena	Record	Attendance
1	September 24	Dallas Sidekicks	2–2	SMU Mustangs	Ownby Stadium	0–0–1	N/A
2	N/A	Dallas Sidekicks	–	Richardson Rockets	N/A	1–0–1	N/A
3	October 13	Dallas Sidekicks	–	Houston Express	N/A Houston, Texas	2–0–1	N/A
4	October 21	Dallas Sidekicks	4–6	Wichita Wings	Kansas Coliseum	2–1–1	N/A

=== Regular season ===
1986–87 Regular Season (31–21)

October (1–0)
#	Date	Away	Score	Home	Arena	Record	Attendance
1	October 28	San Diego Sockers	3–9	Dallas Sidekicks	Reunion Arena	1–0	10,782

November (5–3)
#	Date	Away	Score	Home	Arena	Record	Attendance
2	November 4	St. Louis Storm	4–5 (OT)	Dallas Sidekicks	Reunion Arena	2–0	9,419
3	November 11	Kansas City Comets	4–5 (OT)	Dallas Sidekicks	Reunion Arena	3–0	9,889
4	November 12	Dallas Sidekicks	2–6	San Diego Sockers	San Diego Sports Arena	3–1	6,772
5	November 17	Dallas Sidekicks	3–0	Wichita Wings	Kansas Coliseum	4–1	7,025
6	November 19	St. Louis Storm	4–3 (2OT)	Dallas Sidekicks	Reunion Arena	4–2	7,094
7	November 21	Dallas Sidekicks	7–3	Baltimore Blast	Baltimore Arena	5–2	5,560
8	November 24	Dallas Sidekicks	8–3	Cleveland Crunch	Richfield Coliseum	5–3	6,723
9	November 26	Baltimore Blast	2–3	Dallas Sidekicks	Reunion Arena	6–3	6,672

December (4–5)
#	Date	Away	Score	Home	Arena	Record	Attendance
10	December 1	Dallas Sidekicks	3–4	Wichita Wings	Kansas Coliseum	6–4	7,059
11	December 2	Kansas City Comets	4–6	Dallas Sidekicks	Reunion Arena	7–4	9,911
12	December 8	Dallas Sidekicks	1–3	Kansas City Comets	Kemper Arena	7–5	11,539
13	December 9	San Diego Sockers	1–4	Dallas Sidekicks	Reunion Arena	8–5	8,640
14	December 16	Tacoma Stars	4–5 (OT)	Dallas Sidekicks	Reunion Arena	9–5	8,296
15	December 22	Dallas Sidekicks	5–3	Cleveland Crunch	Richfield Coliseum	10–5	4,971
16	December 23	Dallas Sidekicks	3–4	St. Louis Storm	St. Louis Arena	10–6	5,421
17	December 28	Baltimore Blast	5–1	Dallas Sidekicks	Reunion Arena	10–7	9,035
18	December 30	Dallas Sidekicks	3–4 (OT)	Tacoma Stars	Tacoma Dome	10–8	5,761

January (6–2)
#	Date	Away	Score	Home	Arena	Record	Attendance
19	January 5	Dallas Sidekicks	2–1	St. Louis Storm	St. Louis Arena	11–8	9,052
20	January 6	Tacoma Stars	2–5	Dallas Sidekicks	Reunion Arena	12–8	10,006
21	January 12	Kansas City Comets	4–5 (OT)	Dallas Sidekicks	Reunion Arena	13–8	8,214
22	January 14	Dallas Sidekicks	8–2	Kansas City Comets	Kemper Arena	14–8	8,204
23	January 17	Dallas Sidekicks	4–5	Cleveland Crunch	Richfield Coliseum	14–9	3,406
24	January 19	Dallas Sidekicks	6–7	Baltimore Blast	Baltimore Arena	14–10	9,087
25	January 21	San Diego Sockers	2–4	Dallas Sidekicks	Reunion Arena	15–10	8,495
26	January 27	Wichita Wings	3–4 (OT)	Dallas Sidekicks	Reunion Arena	16–10	14,861

February (5–4)
#	Date	Away	Score	Home	Arena	Record	Attendance
27	February 4	Cleveland Crunch	4–5 (OT)	Dallas Sidekicks	Reunion Arena	17–10	5,003
28	February 2	Dallas Sidekicks	4–5 (OT)	Wichita Wings	Kansas Coliseum	17–11	8,047
29	February 1	Dallas Sidekicks	2–6	San Diego Sockers	San Diego Sports Arena	17–12	7,487
30	February 9	Baltimore Blast	4–3	Dallas Sidekicks	Reunion Arena	17–13	8,877
31	February 11	Dallas Sidekicks	2–1 (OT)	Tacoma Stars	Tacoma Dome	18–13	5,237
32	February 16	Tacoma Stars	5–7	Dallas Sidekicks	Reunion Arena	19–13	8,687
33	February 18	Cleveland Crunch	0–8	Dallas Sidekicks	Reunion Arena	20–13	8,618
34	February 24	Dallas Sidekicks	4–3	Cleveland Crunch	Richfield Coliseum	21–13	4,401
35	February 28	San Diego Sockers	9–5	Dallas Sidekicks	Reunion Arena	21–14	5,787

March (6–4)
#	Date	Away	Score	Home	Arena	Record	Attendance
36	March 3	Wichita Wings	6–7 (OT)	Dallas Sidekicks	Reunion Arena	22–14	10,445
37	March 4	Baltimore Blast	5–4 (2OT)	Dallas Sidekicks	Reunion Arena	22–15	9,444
38	March 9	Dallas Sidekicks	8–4	St. Louis Storm	St. Louis Arena	23–15	8,001
39	March 14	Dallas Sidekicks	4–3	Baltimore Blast	Baltimore Arena	24–15	5,868
40	March 16	Dallas Sidekicks	4–3 (OT)	Tacoma Stars	Tacoma Dome	25–15	5,066
41	March 18	Wichita Wings	3–2	Dallas Sidekicks	Reunion Arena	25–16	8,328
42	March 25	Dallas Sidekicks	3–4	Kansas City Comets	Kemper Arena	25–17	10,688
43	March 27	Dallas Sidekicks	3–1	Wichita Wings	Kansas Coliseum	26–17	6,283
44	March 29	Tacoma Stars	4–6	Dallas Sidekicks	Reunion Arena	27–17	6,557
45	March 30	Dallas Sidekicks	2–3	San Diego Sockers	San Diego Sports Arena	27–18	8,195

April (4–3)
#	Date	Away	Score	Home	Arena	Record	Attendance
46	April 6	Kansas City Comets	2–4	Dallas Sidekicks	Reunion Arena	28–18	10,603
47	April 8	St. Louis Storm	2–4	Dallas Sidekicks	Reunion Arena	29–18	10,033
48	April 13	Dallas Sidekicks	3–4	San Diego Sockers	San Diego Sports Arena	29–19	9,008
49	April 14	Dallas Sidekicks	5–4 (OT)	Tacoma Stars	Tacoma Dome	30–19	7,129
50	April 18	Cleveland Crunch	3–2	Dallas Sidekicks	Reunion Arena	30–20	6,629
51	April 19	Dallas Sidekicks	1–6	St. Louis Storm	St. Louis Arena	30–21	4,547
52	April 21	St. Louis Storm	3–6	Dallas Sidekicks	Reunion Arena	31–21	13,740

Legend: Win Loss

=== Postseason ===
Western Division Finals (2–4)
#	Date	Away	Score	Home	Arena	Series	Attendance
1	May 11	San Diego Sockers	4–2	Dallas Sidekicks	Reunion Arena	0–1	8,061
2	May 12	San Diego Sockers	1–6	Dallas Sidekicks	Reunion Arena	1–1	10,105
3	May 18	Dallas Sidekicks	4–1	San Diego Sockers	San Diego Sports Arena	2–1	9,009
4	May 20	Dallas Sidekicks	2–4	San Diego Sockers	San Diego Sports Arena	2–2	6,422
5	May 22	Dallas Sidekicks	0–4	San Diego Sockers	San Diego Sports Arena	2–3	7,678
6	May 24	San Diego Sockers	3–1	Dallas Sidekicks	Reunion Arena	2–4	7,664

== Final standings ==
Western Division
		GP	W	L	Pct	GB	GF	GA
1	y-Dallas Sidekicks	52	31	21	.596	–	217	190
2	x-San Diego Sockers	52	25	27	.481	6	217	204
3	St. Louis Storm	52	24	28	.462	7	202	205
4	Tacoma Stars	52	20	32	.385	11	191	217

y – division champions, x – clinched playoff berth
