= 1987–88 Dallas Sidekicks season =

Dallas Sidekicks
1987–88 season
- Owner: Sidekicks I, Ltd.
- Head Coach: (England) Gordon Jago
- Stadium: Reunion Arena
- MISL: 3rd (Eastern Division)
- MISL Playoffs: Lost Eastern Division Semifinals (vs. Cleveland Force, 1-3)
- Average home league attendance: 9,878

The 1987–88 Dallas Sidekicks season was the fourth season of the Dallas Sidekicks indoor soccer club. The team entered the season as defending MISL champions. They made it back to the playoffs for the third consecutive year, but were unsuccessful in the defense of their title, losing in the first round. The team's average attendance for the season was 9,878, which is the franchise record to this day.

== Roster ==
Note: Flags indicate national team as defined under FIFA eligibility rules; some limited exceptions apply. Players may hold more than one non-FIFA nationality.

No.	Pos.	Nation	Player
1	GK	USA	Joe Papaleo
2	DF	ENG	David Stride
3	DF	IRL	Victor Moreland
5	DF	USA	Mike Powers
6	MF	USA	Ed Radwanski
7	MF	CAN	Scott Bell
8	MF	ENG	Wes McLeod
9	FW	BRA	Tatu
10	FW	USA	Kevin Smith
11	FW	ENG	Godfrey Ingram
11	FW	USA	Pedro DeBrito

No.	Pos.	Nation	Player
14	FW	ENG	Stuart Lee
15	MF	USA	Mark Lugris
16	DF	CHI	Jorge Espinoza
17	MF	USA	Mike Jeffries
18	MF	CAN	Mark Karpun
19	MF	USA	Mickey Kydes
20	MF	BRA	Bruno Feretti
21	FW	COL	Willie Molano
22	FW	USA	Doc Lawson
25	MF	BRA	Beto
31	GK	POL	Krys Sobieski

== Schedule and results ==
=== Preseason ===
Preseason (3-4)
#	Date	Away	Score	Home	Arena	Record	Attendance
1	October 10	Dallas Sidekicks	3-4	Kansas City Comets	Omaha Civic Center	0-1	4,011
2	October 16	Dallas Sidekicks	4-1	Wichita Wings	Kansas Coliseum	1-1	5,603
3	October 18	Kansas City Comets	7-4	Dallas Sidekicks	Cajundome	1-2	N/A
4	October 23	Dallas Sidekicks	4-2	Baltimore Blast	Richmond Coliseum	2-2	5,603
5	October 24	Dallas Sidekicks	5-9	Baltimore Blast	The Scope	2-3	3,645
6	October 27	Dallas Sidekicks	6-8	Cleveland Force	N/A (Richfield, Ohio)	2-4	12,619
7	October 31	Wichita Wings	2-5	Dallas Sidekicks	HemisFair Arena	3-4	2,146

=== Regular season ===
1987–88 Regular Season (28-28)

November (4-5)
#	Date	Away	Score	Home	Arena	Record	Attendance
1	November 4	Dallas Sidekicks	4-3	Tacoma Stars	Tacoma Dome	1-0	13,452
2	November 7	Chicago Sting	2-5	Dallas Sidekicks	Reunion Arena	2-0	16,115
3	November 12	Wichita Wings	1-3	Dallas Sidekicks	Reunion Arena	3-0	5,767
4	November 13	Dallas Sidekicks	4-7	St. Louis Steamers	St. Louis Arena	3-1	12,102
5	November 17	Dallas Sidekicks	3-6	Baltimore Blast	Baltimore Arena	3-2	7,135
6	November 18	Dallas Sidekicks	1-3	Cleveland Force	Richfield Coliseum	3-3	6,604
7	November 20	San Diego Sockers	4-3 (OT)	Dallas Sidekicks	Reunion Arena	3-4	12,368
8	November 25	Dallas Sidekicks	4-3 (OT)	Kansas City Comets	Kemper Arena	4-4	10,048
9	November 28	Baltimore Blast	2-1	Dallas Sidekicks	Reunion Arena	4-5	12,107

December (4-5)
#	Date	Away	Score	Home	Arena	Record	Attendance
10	December 2	Los Angeles Lazers	4-6	Dallas Sidekicks	Reunion Arena	5-5	6,107
11	December 4	Dallas Sidekicks	3-4 (OT)	Chicago Sting	Rosemont Horizon	5-6	9,176
12	December 6	Kansas City Comets	7-6 (3OT)	Dallas Sidekicks	Reunion Arena	5-7	7,517
13	December 12	San Diego Sockers	0-3	Dallas Sidekicks	Reunion Arena	6-7	9,277
14	December 18	Dallas Sidekicks	5-7	Wichita Wings	Kansas Coliseum	6-8	7,826
15	December 19	Wichita Wings	0-2	Dallas Sidekicks	Reunion Arena	7-8	8,770
16	December 26	Dallas Sidekicks	1-5	San Diego Sockers	San Diego Sports Arena	7-9	8,905
17	December 27	Dallas Sidekicks	4-3 (OT)	Los Angeles Lazers	The Forum	8-9	7,044
18	December 30	Cleveland Force	5-2	Dallas Sidekicks	Reunion Arena	8-10	9,170

January (5-6)
#	Date	Away	Score	Home	Arena	Record	Attendance
19	January 2	Baltimore Blast	1-2	Dallas Sidekicks	Reunion Arena	9-10	11,507
20	January 5	Dallas Sidekicks	6-7 (OT)	Minnesota Strikers	Met Center	9-11	2,984
21	January 8	St. Louis Steamers	4-6	Dallas Sidekicks	Reunion Arena	10-11	9,277
22	January 15	Dallas Sidekicks	1-3	Chicago Sting	Rosemont Horizon	10-12	4,235
23	January 17	Cleveland Force	3-2	Dallas Sidekicks	Reunion Arena	10-13	9,407
24	January 21	Baltimore Blast	4-5 (OT)	Dallas Sidekicks	Reunion Arena	11-13	7,239
25	January 22	Dallas Sidekicks	1-2	Cleveland Force	Richfield Coliseum	11-14	15,106
26	January 24	Minnesota Strikers	3-6	Dallas Sidekicks	Reunion Arena	12-14	10,107
27	January 26	Dallas Sidekicks	2-7	Minnesota Strikers	Met Center	12-15	3,032
28	January 29	Dallas Sidekicks	3-4	Tacoma Stars	Tacoma Dome	12-16	10,172
29	January 30	Dallas Sidekicks	4-2	Chicago Sting	Rosemont Horizon	13-16	8,857

February (6-4)
#	Date	Away	Score	Home	Arena	Record	Attendance
30	February 5	Dallas Sidekicks	4-5	Baltimore Blast	Baltimore Arena	13-17	8,821
31	February 7	Chicago Sting	2-4	Dallas Sidekicks	Reunion Arena	14-17	10,105
32	February 10	Minnesota Strikers	2-3	Dallas Sidekicks	Reunion Arena	15-17	7,117
33	February 12	Dallas Sidekicks	2-5	Wichita Wings	Kansas Coliseum	15-18	9,674
34	February 14	St. Louis Steamers	2-7	Dallas Sidekicks	Reunion Arena	16-18	11,720
35	February 19	Dallas Sidekicks	7-8 (3OT)	Minnesota Strikers	Met Center	16-19	4,886
36	February 20	Cleveland Force	1-3	Dallas Sidekicks	Reunion Arena	17-19	11,817
37	February 23	Baltimore Blast	1-4	Dallas Sidekicks	Reunion Arena	18-19	6,057
38	February 26	Chicago Sting	4-5 (OT)	Dallas Sidekicks	Reunion Arena	19-19	12,378
39	February 27	Dallas Sidekicks	3-4	Baltimore Blast	Baltimore Arena	19-20	10,284

March (7-3)
#	Date	Away	Score	Home	Arena	Record	Attendance
40	March 1	Tacoma Stars	1-6	Dallas Sidekicks	Reunion Arena	20-20	6,877
41	March 5	Los Angeles Lazers	2-4	Dallas Sidekicks	Reunion Arena	21-20	11,877
42	March 9	Minnesota Strikers	4-5	Dallas Sidekicks	Reunion Arena	22-20	7,197
43	March 12	Dallas Sidekicks	1-2	San Diego Sockers	San Diego Sports Arena	22-21	9,693
44	March 13	Dallas Sidekicks	2-7	Los Angeles Lazers	The Forum	22-22	5,111
45	March 19	Kansas City Comets	3-4 (OT)	Dallas Sidekicks	Reunion Arena	23-22	13,030
46	March 20	Tacoma Stars	3-4	Dallas Sidekicks	Reunion Arena	24-22	10,131
47	March 23	Cleveland Force	5-2	Dallas Sidekicks	Reunion Arena	24-23	7,576
48	March 27	Dallas Sidekicks	5-3	St. Louis Steamers	St. Louis Arena	25-23	3,857
49	March 30	Dallas Sidekicks	5-4	Cleveland Force	Richfield Coliseum	26-23	13,053

April (2-5)
#	Date	Away	Score	Home	Arena	Record	Attendance
50	April 2	Dallas Sidekicks	3-8	Chicago Sting	Rosemont Horizon	26-24	3,287
51	April 5	Dallas Sidekicks	2-5	Minnesota Strikers	Met Center	26-25	4,879
52	April 7	Chicago Sting	3-4 (OT)	Dallas Sidekicks	Reunion Arena	27-25	10,771
53	April 8	Dallas Sidekicks	2-3	Kansas City Comets	Kemper Arena	27-26	14,415
54	April 10	Minnesota Strikers	2-4	Dallas Sidekicks	Reunion Arena	28-26	15,198
55	April 15	Dallas Sidekicks	2-6	Baltimore Blast	Baltimore Arena	28-27	9,060
56	April 16	Dallas Sidekicks	3-5	Cleveland Force	Richfield Coliseum	28-28	18,364

Legend: Win Loss

=== Postseason ===
Eastern Division Semifinals (1-3)
#	Date	Away	Score	Home	Arena	Series	Attendance
1	April 22	Dallas Sidekicks	2-3	Cleveland Force	Richfield Coliseum	0-1	5,651
2	April 24	Dallas Sidekicks	6-3	Cleveland Force	Richfield Coliseum	1-1	5,690
3	April 29	Cleveland Force	5-4 (2OT)	Dallas Sidekicks	Reunion Arena	1-2	10,517
4	May 1	Cleveland Force	5-2	Dallas Sidekicks	Reunion Arena	1-3	8,600

== Final standings ==
Eastern Division
		GP	W	L	Pct	GB	GF	GA
1	y-Minnesota Strikers	56	31	25	.554	--	274	252
2	x-Cleveland Force	56	30	26	.536	1	242	219
3	x-Dallas Sidekicks	56	28	28	.500	3	200	204
4	x-Baltimore Blast	56	25	31	.446	6	235	249
5	Chicago Sting	56	24	32	.429	7	227	247

y – division champions, x – clinched playoff berth
