= 1985–86 Dallas Sidekicks season =

Dallas Sidekicks
1985–86 season
- Owner: Don Carter
- Head Coach: Gordon Jago
- Stadium: Reunion Arena
- MISL: 3rd (Eastern Division)
- MISL Playoffs: Lost Eastern Division Semifinals
- Average home league attendance: 6,654

The 1985–86 Dallas Sidekicks season was the second season of the Dallas Sidekicks indoor soccer club. It saw the team move to the Eastern Division and make the playoffs for the first time in franchise in history.

== Roster ==
Note: Flags indicate national team as defined under FIFA eligibility rules; some limited exceptions apply. Players may hold more than one non-FIFA nationality.

No.	Pos.	Nation	Player
0	GK	USA	Billy Phillips
1	GK	NED	Jan van Beveren
2	DF	ENG	David Stride
3	DF	IRL	Victor Moreland
4	DF	CAN	Mike Uremovich
5	DF	IRL	Martin Donnelly
6	MF	USA	Ed Radwanski
7	FW	USA	Perry Van der Beck
8	MF	ENG	Wes McLeod
9	FW	BRA	Tatu
10	FW	USA	Kevin Smith
11	MF	POR	Pedro DeBrito
12	MF	IRL	Billy Caskey

No.	Pos.	Nation	Player
13	MF	YUG	Louis Nanchoff
14	FW	USA	Jeff Rogers
15	FW	USA	Jim Gabarra
15	FW	ARG	Oscar Fabbiani
16	FW	CHI	Diego Castro
17	DF	USA	Mark Evans
18	MF	CAN	Mark Karpun
19	MF	SWE	Rickard Strombeck
20	FW	ENG	Steve Gardner
20	FW	SCO	Charlie Cooke
22	FW	USA	Doc Lawson
31	GK	POL	Krys Sobieski

== Schedule and results ==
=== Pre-season ===
Preseason (4–1)
#	Date	Away	Score	Home	Arena	Record	Attendance
1	October 8	Dallas Sidekicks	7-3	Wichita Wings	Tulsa Convention Center	1-0	617
2	October 12	Wichita Wings	3-6	Dallas Sidekicks	Bayfront Center	2-0	N/A
3	October 16	Dallas Sidekicks	9-3	Phoenix Select	N/A (Phoenix, Arizona)	3-0	N/A
4	October 18	Dallas Sidekicks	3-4	Baltimore Blast	Kansas Coliseum	3-1	4,500
5	October 19	Dallas Sidekicks	8-1	Los Angeles Lazers	Kansas Coliseum	4-1	4,600

=== Regular season ===
1985–86 Regular Season (25–23)

October (1–0)
#	Date	Away	Score	Home	Arena	Record	Attendance
1	October 25	Los Angeles Lazers	5-7	Dallas Sidekicks	Reunion Arena	1-0	6,299

November (2–6)
#	Date	Away	Score	Home	Arena	Record	Attendance
2	November 2	Dallas Sidekicks	3-4	Tacoma Stars	Tacoma Dome	1-1	4,126
3	November 7	Wichita Wings	7-6	Dallas Sidekicks	Reunion Arena	1-2	4,126
4	November 13	Baltimore Blast	7-3	Dallas Sidekicks	Reunion Arena	1-3	4,196
5	November 16	Tacoma Stars	2-5	Dallas Sidekicks	Reunion Arena	2-3	8,330
6	November 22	San Diego Sockers	5-3	Dallas Sidekicks	Reunion Arena	2-4	6,882
7	November 23	Dallas Sidekicks	4-5	Pittsburgh Spirit	Civic Arena	2-5	9,224
8	November 26	Dallas Sidekicks	5-7	Minnesota Strikers	Met Center	2-6	3,771
9	November 30	Dallas Sidekicks	8-6	Wichita Wings	Kansas Coliseum	3-6	4,119

December (6–4)
#	Date	Away	Score	Home	Arena	Record	Attendance
10	December 3	Chicago Sting	3-4 (OT)	Dallas Sidekicks	Reunion Arena	4-6	4,242
11	December 6	Dallas Sidekicks	4-2	Cleveland Force	Richfield Coliseum	5-6	10,191
12	December 8	Dallas Sidekicks	5-4	Baltimore Blast	Baltimore Arena	6-6	8,579
13	December 13	Baltimore Blast	9-5	Dallas Sidekicks	Reunion Arena	6-7	7,364
14	December 14	Dallas Sidekicks	5-7	St. Louis Steamers	St. Louis Arena	6-8	8,187
15	December 18	Pittsburgh Spirit	4-5 (OT)	Dallas Sidekicks	Reunion Arena	7-8	4,009
16	December 20	Dallas Sidekicks	6-4	Los Angeles Lazers	The Forum	8-8	4,235
17	December 21	Dallas Sidekicks	3-7	San Diego Sockers	San Diego Sports Arena	8-9	7,479
18	December 27	Dallas Sidekicks	3-6	Chicago Sting	Chicago Stadium	8-10	7,201
19	December 28	Minnesota Strikers	2-4	Dallas Sidekicks	Reunion Arena	9-10	6,370

January (6–5)
#	Date	Away	Score	Home	Arena	Record	Attendance
20	January 3	Kansas City Comets	2-1	Dallas Sidekicks	Reunion Arena	9-11	7,112
21	January 4	Dallas Sidekicks	4-8	Baltimore Blast	Baltimore Arena	9-12	11,746
22	January 8	Cleveland Force	5-2	Dallas Sidekicks	Reunion Arena	9-13	3,710
23	January 10	Dallas Sidekicks	5-4 (2OT)	Cleveland Force	Richfield Coliseum	10-13	10,738
24	January 12	Dallas Sidekicks	8-1	Minnesota Strikers	Met Center	11-13	6,715
25	January 18	Pittsburgh Spirit	4-5 (2OT)	Dallas Sidekicks	Reunion Arena	12-13	11,136
26	January 21	Wichita Wings	2-3	Dallas Sidekicks	Kansas Coliseum	13-13	4,311
27	January 24	Dallas Sidekicks	4-6	St. Louis Steamers	St. Louis Arena	13-14	11,227
28	January 25	Chicago Sting	4-7	Dallas Sidekicks	Reunion Arena	14-14	11,612
29	January 30	Minnesota Strikers	8-11	Dallas Sidekicks	Reunion Arena	15-14	4,091
30	January 31	Dallas Sidekicks	1-4	Pittsburgh Spirit	Civic Arena	15-15	6,753

February (3-3)
#	Date	Away	Score	Home	Arena	Record	Attendance
31	February 7	Dallas Sidekicks	4-5 (OT)	Tacoma Stars	Tacoma Dome	15-16	9,152
32	February 9	Dallas Sidekicks	5-4	Kansas City Comets	Kemper Arena	16-16	11,844
33	February 11	Kansas City Comets	4-5	Dallas Sidekicks	Reunion Arena	17-16	4,417
34	February 14	Cleveland Force	6-3	Dallas Sidekicks	Reunion Arena	17-17	6,474
35	February 22	Los Angeles Lazers	7-8 (OT)	Dallas Sidekicks	Reunion Arena	18-17	10,832
36	February 25	Minnesota Strikers	7-4	Dallas Sidekicks	Reunion Arena	18-18	5,316

March (7–3)
#	Date	Away	Score	Home	Arena	Record	Attendance
37	March 1	Dallas Sidekicks	6-4	Chicago Sting	Chicago Stadium	19-18	10,125
38	March 2	Dallas Sidekicks	2-5	Pittsburgh Spirit	Civic Arena	19-19	10,972
39	March 5	Chicago Sting	7-3	Dallas Sidekicks	Reunion Arena	20-19	4,828
40	March 8	Dallas Sidekicks	2-5	Baltimore Blast	Baltimore Arena	20-20	12,407
41	March 13	St. Louis Steamers	1-7	Dallas Sidekicks	Reunion Arena	21-20	5,289
42	March 16	Cleveland Force	4-6	Dallas Sidekicks	Reunion Arena	22-20	9,261
43	March 19	Baltimore Blast	3-4	Dallas Sidekicks	Reunion Arena	23-20	7,379
44	March 23	Pittsburgh Spirit	1-4	Dallas Sidekicks	Reunion Arena	24-20	11,836
45	March 27	Dallas Sidekicks	6-5 (OT)	Chicago Sting	Chicago Stadium	25-20	6,919
46	March 29	Dallas Sidekicks	3-9	Cleveland Force	Richfield Coliseum	25-21	18,135

April (0–2)
#	Date	Away	Score	Home	Arena	Record	Attendance
47	April 2	Dallas Sidekicks	2-6	Minnesota Strikers	Met Center	25-22	5,895
48	April 5	Dallas Sidekicks	3-8	San Diego Sockers	San Diego Sports Arena	25-23	10,382

Legend: Win Loss

=== Postseason ===
Eastern Division Semifinals (1–3)
#	Date	Away	Score	Home	Arena	Series	Attendance
1	April 12	Dallas Sidekicks	3-5	Minnesota Strikers	Met Center	0-1	7,101
2	April 13	Dallas Sidekicks	2-7	Minnesota Strikers	Met Center	0-2	5,151
3	April 16	Minnesota Strikers	1-4	Dallas Sidekicks	Reunion Arena	1-2	10,218
4	April 19	Minnesota Strikers	7-4	Dallas Sidekicks	Reunion Arena	1-3	13,908

== Final standings ==
Eastern Division
		GP	W	L	Pct	GB	GF	GA
1	y-Cleveland Force	48	27	21	.563	--	252	212
2	x-Minnesota Strikers	48	26	22	.542	1	232	242
3	x-Dallas Sidekicks	48	25	23	.521	2	220	231
4	x-Baltimore Blast	48	24	24	.500	3	211	201
5	Chicago Sting	48	23	25	.479	4	196	196
6	Pittsburgh Spirit	48	23	25	.479	4	221	237

y – division champions, x – clinched playoff berth
