= 1984–85 Dallas Sidekicks season =

Dallas Sidekicks
1984-85 season
- Owner: (United States) Don Carter
- Head coach: (England) Gordon Jago
- Stadium: Reunion Arena
- MISL: 7th (Western Division)
- MISL Playoffs: Did not qualify
- Average home league attendance: 4,969

The 1984–85 Dallas Sidekicks season was the inaugural season of the Dallas Sidekicks professional indoor soccer club.

== Roster ==
Note: Flags indicate national team as defined under FIFA eligibility rules; some limited exceptions apply. Players may hold more than one non-FIFA nationality.

No.	Pos.	Nation	Player
0	GK	USA	Billy Phillips
1	GK	NED	Jan van Beveren
2	DF	USA	Neil Cohen
3	DF	USA	Joe Ulrich
4	DF	CAN	Mike Uremovich
5	DF	ENG	Mark Nickeas
6	MF	SWE	Mikael Ronnberg
7	FW	USA	Herve Guilliod
8	MF	ENG	Kevin Smith
9	FW	BRA	Tatu
10	FW	USA	Mark Kerlin
11	MF	IRL	Fran O'Brien

No.	Pos.	Nation	Player
12	DF	USA	Mike Twellman
13	MF	CAN	Wes McLeod
14	FW	USA	Ian Martin
15	DF	ENG	Manny Andruszewski
16	MF	USA	Ron Dufrene
17	DF	USA	Mark Evans
18	MF	CAN	Mark Karpun
19	MF	SWE	Rickard Strombeck
20	FW	ENG	Steve Gardner
20	FW	ARG	Miguel Batalla
21	MF	USA	Perry Van der Beck
30	GK	USA	Peter Simonini

== Schedule and results ==
=== Preseason ===
Preseason (1-3)
#	Date	Away	Score	Home	Arena	Record	Attendance
1	October 19	Dallas Sidekicks	7-3	Tacoma Stars	Kansas Coliseum	1-0	N/A
2	October 20	Dallas Sidekicks	4-6	Los Angeles Lazers	Kansas Coliseum	1-1	N/A
3	October 27	Wichita Wings	6-3	Dallas Sidekicks	Will Rogers Center	1-2	2,772
4	October 29	Wichita Wings	5-4 (OT)	Dallas Sidekicks	Reunion Arena	1-3	2,994

=== Regular season ===
1984–85 Regular Season (12-36)

November (0-8)
#	Date	Away	Score	Home	Arena	Record	Attendance
1	November 2	Las Vegas Americans	7-3	Dallas Sidekicks	Reunion Arena	0-1	5,034
2	November 7	San Diego Sockers	8-4	Dallas Sidekicks	Reunion Arena	0-2	3,239
3	November 9	Cleveland Force	10-4	Dallas Sidekicks	Reunion Arena	0-3	3,903
4	November 12	Dallas Sidekicks	3-7	Los Angeles Lazers	The Forum	0-4	4,332
5	November 16	Dallas Sidekicks	2-5	Minnesota Strikers	Met Center	0-5	4,721
6	November 23	Baltimore Blast	7-2	Dallas Sidekicks	Reunion Arena	0-6	5,762
7	November 24	Dallas Sidekicks	3-6	Baltimore Blast	Baltimore Arena	0-7	11,047
8	November 28	Dallas Sidekicks	3-5	Pittsburgh Spirit	Civic Arena	0-8	5,122

December (5-5)
#	Date	Away	Score	Home	Arena	Record	Attendance
9	December 1	St. Louis Steamers	7-4	Dallas Sidekicks	Reunion Arena	0-9	5,163
10	December 4	Tacoma Stars	3-0	Dallas Sidekicks	Reunion Arena	0-10	1,284
11	December 8	New York Cosmos	2–9	Dallas Sidekicks	Reunion Arena	1-10	4,305
12	December 11	Kansas City Comets	5-3	Dallas Sidekicks	Reunion Arena	1-11	3,112
13	December 14	Dallas Sidekicks	5-4	Minnesota Strikers	Met Center	2-11	4,663
14	December 15	Wichita Wings	5-6 (OT)	Dallas Sidekicks	Reunion Arena	3-11	4,058
15	December 19	Dallas Sidekicks	6-11	San Diego Sockers	San Diego Sports Arena	3-12	7,043
16	December 22	Dallas Sidekicks	3-7	Tacoma Stars	Tacoma Dome	3-13	6,033
17	December 28	Pittsburgh Spirit	1-6	Dallas Sidekicks	Reunion Arena	4-13	5,227
18	December 30	Dallas Sidekicks	7-6 (OT)	St. Louis Steamers	St. Louis Arena	5-13	15,094

January (3-6)
#	Date	Away	Score	Home	Arena	Record	Attendance
19	January 4	Las Vegas Americans	8-2	Dallas Sidekicks	Reunion Arena	5-14	4,552
20	January 9	Dallas Sidekicks	4-3	Kansas City Comets	Kemper Arena	6-14	10,462
21	January 12	Los Angeles Lazers	7-2	Dallas Sidekicks	Reunion Arena	6-15	6,801
22	January 16	Dallas Sidekicks	4-6	Cleveland Force	Richfield Coliseum	6-16	6,524
23	January 17	Dallas Sidekicks	4-6	New York Cosmos	Brendan Byrne Arena	6-17	1,224
24	January 19	Tacoma Stars	4-8	Dallas Sidekicks	Reunion Arena	7-17	6,524
25	January 22	New York Cosmos	4-5 (OT)	Dallas Sidekicks	Reunion Arena	8-17	3,610
26	January 26	Dallas Sidekicks	3-8	Baltimore Blast	Baltimore Arena	8-18	12,523
27	January 29	Dallas Sidekicks	4-5 (OT)	Wichita Wings	Kansas Coliseum	8-19	8,225

February (3-5)
#	Date	Away	Score	Home	Arena	Record	Attendance
28	February 5	Chicago Sting	4-6	Dallas Sidekicks	Reunion Arena	9-19	3,506
29	February 8	Cleveland Force	5-4 (OT)	Dallas Sidekicks	Reunion Arena	9-20	7,014
30	February 10	Dallas Sidekicks	7-6	Chicago Sting	Chicago Stadium	10-20	8,407
31	February 12	Dallas Sidekicks	6-7	Tacoma Stars	Tacoma Dome	10-21	6,043
32	February 14	Dallas Sidekicks	4-6	Las Vegas Americans	Thomas & Mack Center	10-22	4,721
33	February 17	Baltimore Blast	8-4	Dallas Sidekicks	Reunion Arena	10-23	7,372
34	February 20	Dallas Sidekicks	2-8	Kansas City Comets	Kansas Coliseum	10-24	10,643
35	February 27	Chicago Sting	4-5	Dallas Sidekicks	Reunion Arena	11-24	4,031

March (1-8)
#	Date	Away	Score	Home	Arena	Record	Attendance
36	March 5	Dallas Sidekicks	5-8	San Diego Sockers	San Diego Sports Arena	11-25	7,049
37	March 6	Los Angeles Lazers	3-4	Dallas Sidekicks	Reunion Arena	12-25	3,052
38	March 12	Wichita Wings	2-1	Dallas Sidekicks	Reunion Arena	12-26	3,806
39	March 14	Minnesota Strikers	5-4	Dallas Sidekicks	Reunion Arena	12-27	4,529
40	March 15	Dallas Sidekicks	3-6	St. Louis Steamers	St. Louis Arena	12-28	11,774
41	March 17	San Diego Sockers	7-3	Dallas Sidekicks	Reunion Arena	12-29	8,029
42	March 21	Dallas Sidekicks	4-8	Las Vegas Americans	Thomas & Mack Center	12-30	8,712
43	March 22	Dallas Sidekicks	4-7	Los Angeles Lazers	The Forum	12-31	5,469
44	March 27	Dallas Sidekicks	1-5	Cleveland Force	Richfield Coliseum	12-32	10,221

April (0-4)
#	Date	Away	Score	Home	Arena	Record	Attendance
45	April 4	Kansas City Comets	6-4	Dallas Sidekicks	Reunion Arena	12-33	10,611
46	April 5	Dallas Sidekicks	4-6	Wichita Wings	Kansas Coliseum	12-34	9,579
47	April 9	Dallas Sidekicks	5-11	Minnesota Strikers	Met Center	12-35	3,979
48	April 13	Dallas Sidekicks	5-7	Pittsburgh Spirit	Civic Arena	12-36	5,761

Legend: Win Loss

== Final standings ==
Western Division
		GP	W	L	Pct	GB	GF	GA
1	y-San Diego Sockers	48	37	11	.771	--	302	201
2	x-Las Vegas Americans	48	30	18	.625	7	269	214
3	x-Los Angeles Lazers	48	24	24	.500	13	232	230
4	x-Kansas City Comets	48	22	26	.458	15	216	221
5	x-Wichita Wings	48	21	26	.438	16	202	233
6	Tacoma Stars	48	17	31	.354	20	207	263
7	Dallas Sidekicks	48	12	36	.250	25	194	286

y – division champions, x – clinched playoff berth
