= 1989–90 Major Indoor Soccer League season =

Major Indoor Soccer League
- Season: 1989–90
- Champions: San Diego Sockers (6th title)
- Matches: 208
- Goals: 1,677 (8.06 per match)
- Top goalscorer: (Brazil) Tatu (64 goals)
- Average attendance: 7,765

The 1989–90 Major Indoor Soccer League season was the 12th in league history.

== Map of clubs ==
Eastern Division Western Division

== Final standings ==
Eastern Division
| Team | Pld | HW | HL | AW | AL | GF | GA | GD | GB | PCT | Qualification |
|---|---|---|---|---|---|---|---|---|---|---|---|
| Baltimore Blast | 52 | 19 | 7 | 13 | 13 | 231 | 191 | +40 | — | .615 | Playoffs |
| Kansas City Comets | 52 | 23 | 3 | 7 | 19 | 208 | 205 | +3 | 2 | .577 | Playoffs |
| Wichita Wings | 52 | 18 | 8 | 8 | 18 | 210 | 229 | −19 | 6 | .500 | Playoffs |
| Cleveland Crunch | 52 | 13 | 13 | 7 | 19 | 201 | 237 | −36 | 12 | .385 | |

Western Division
| Team | Pld | HW | HL | AW | AL | GF | GA | GD | GB | PCT | Qualification |
|---|---|---|---|---|---|---|---|---|---|---|---|
| Dallas Sidekicks | 52 | 19 | 7 | 12 | 14 | 217 | 190 | +27 | — | .596 | Playoffs |
| San Diego Sockers | 52 | 19 | 7 | 6 | 20 | 217 | 204 | +13 | 6 | .481 | Playoffs |
| St. Louis Storm | 52 | 15 | 11 | 9 | 17 | 202 | 205 | −3 | 7 | .462 | Playoffs |
| Tacoma Stars | 52 | 14 | 12 | 6 | 20 | 191 | 217 | −26 | 11 | .385 | |

| Div. Semi-finals: | Kansas City defeated Wichita 5–4, 4–3, 3–4, 5–4 |
| Div. Semi-finals: | San Diego defeated St. Louis 3–2, 3-4 (OT), 4–1, 5–4 |
| Div. Finals: | San Diego defeated Dallas 4–2, 1–6, 1–4, 4–2, 4–0,3-1 |
| Div. Finals: | Baltimore defeated Kansas City 6–4, 4–2, 2-1(OT), 2-3(OT), 2-3(OT), 7–2 |
| Championship: | San Diego def. Baltimore 4–7, 4–3, 5–2, 4–1, 2–3,6-4 |

=== Scoring leaders ===
GP = Games Played, G = Goals, A = Assists, Pts = Points

| Player | Team | GP | G | A | Pts |
|---|---|---|---|---|---|
| (Brazil) Tatu | Dallas Sidekicks | 52 | 64 | 49 | 113 |
| (Netherlands) Jan Goossens | Kansas City Comets | 51 | 41 | 55 | 96 |
| (United States) Preki | Tacoma Stars | 44 | 33 | 39 | 72 |
| (England) Michael King | Cleveland Crunch | 52 | 45 | 26 | 71 |
| (Canada) Dale Mitchell | Kansas City Comets | 48 | 47 | 23 | 70 |
| (United States) Dale Ervine | Wichita Wings | 47 | 48 | 20 | 68 |
| (Canada) Hector Marinaro | Cleveland Crunch | 45 | 40 | 23 | 63 |
| (Canada) Branko Segota | San Diego Sockers | 44 | 27 | 34 | 61 |
| (Canada) Domenic Mobilio | Baltimore Blast | 48 | 41 | 20 | 61 |
| (United States) Chico Borja | Wichita Wings | 43 | 24 | 35 | 59 |

== All-MISL Teams ==
| First Team | Position | Second Team |
|---|---|---|
| (United States) Scott Manning, Baltimore | G | (United States) Joe Papaleo, Dallas |
| (Canada) Wes McLeod, Dallas | D | (United States) Kevin Crow, San Diego |
| (United States) Bruce Savage, Baltimore | D | (United States) Mike Powers , Dallas |
| (United States) Preki, Tacoma | M | (United States) Tim Wittman, Baltimore |
| (Brazil) Tatu, Dallas | F | (England) Michael King, Cleveland |
| (Netherlands) Jan Goossens, Kansas City | F | (Canada) Dale Mitchell, Kansas City |

== League awards ==
Most Valuable Player: (Brazil) Tatu, Dallas

Scoring Champion: (Brazil) Tatu, Dallas

Pass Master: (Netherlands) Jan Goossens, Kansas City

Defender of the Year: (Canada) Wes McLeod, Dallas

Rookie of the Year: (England) Terry Brown, St Louis

Newcomer of the Year: (Brazil) Claudio De Olivieria, St Louis

Goalkeeper of the Year: (United States) Joe Papaleo, Dallas

Coach of the Year: (United States) Billy Phillips, Dallas

Championship Series Most Valuable Player: (United States) Brian Quinn, San Diego

Championship Series Unsung Hero: (United States) Paul Wright, San Diego
