= 1986–87 Major Indoor Soccer League season =

Major Indoor Soccer League
- Season: 1986–87
- Champions: Dallas Sidekicks
- Matches: 299
- Goals: 2,645 (8.85 per match)
- Top goalscorer: (Brazil) Tatu (73 goals)
- Average attendance: 8,714

The 1986–87 Major Indoor Soccer League season was the ninth in league history and ended with the Dallas Sidekicks winning their first MISL title over the Tacoma Stars.

== Recap ==
It was a topsy-turvy season. Attempts to stabilize the league's presence in New York by moving the league office and putting the league's newest franchise there were unsuccessful. The New York Express barely made it to the All-Star break. A stock sale had been a massive failure and results were equally bad on the field. With the club's record at 3-23, management announced on February 16 that they would be unable to finish the season.

As for matters on the field, league officials made plans to expand the schedule further despite losing the Pittsburgh Spirit the previous spring. Not only would each team play 52 games, the playoffs would be expanded to include two best-of seven rounds. With all but one of the six preceding series going to a deciding game, Game 7 of the championship series would be played on June 20, the latest date in MISL history and six days after the conclusion of the NBA Finals. Games 3 and 6 at Dallas' Reunion Arena were sellouts, and the Tacoma Dome attracted crowds of 20,284 and 21,728 for Games 5 and 7, the two largest crowds in MISL playoff history.

The San Diego Sockers' dominance ended this season, as long-term injuries to last year's playoff MVP Brian Quinn and other Sockers had the team uncharacteristically struggling. They would finish eight games behind the Stars, who were led by Steve Zungul and owned the MISL's best regular-season record. Despite Quinn's return for the playoffs, Tacoma defeated San Diego in Game 7 of their division final matchup. It was the first indoor playoff series loss ever for the Sockers, ending a run of 15 straight series wins dating back to the 1981–82 NASL Indoor season.

In the end, the Sidekicks epitomized the MISL season. The club folded in June 1986, yet a last-ditch effort by fans brought the club back to life within three weeks. Tatu led the league in goals and points, and earned both the regular-season and playoff MVP awards. Dallas rallied from a 2-1 series deficit to beat the Baltimore Blast in the first round, and won Games 6 and 7 of the championship series in overtime. Mark Karpun scored both overtime goals, and his Game 6 double overtime winner ended the longest game in MISL playoff history.

Six days after the Sidekicks' victory, the MISL granted a conditional franchise to NBA Denver Nuggets owner Sidney Shlenker for the 1988-89 season. When the planned "Denver Desperados" franchise had only 400 season tickets instead of the required 5,000 four months after the announcement, the franchise was revoked on November 5.

== Teams ==
Team	City/Area	Arena
Baltimore Blast	Baltimore	Baltimore Arena
Chicago Sting	Rosemont, Illinois	Rosemont Horizon
Cleveland Force	Cleveland	Richfield Coliseum
Dallas Sidekicks	Dallas	Reunion Arena
Kansas City Comets	Kansas City, Missouri	Kemper Arena
Los Angeles Lazers	Inglewood, California	The Forum
Minnesota Strikers	Bloomington, Minnesota	Met Center
New York Express	Uniondale, New York	Nassau Veterans Memorial Coliseum
San Diego Sockers	San Diego	San Diego Sports Arena
St. Louis Steamers	St. Louis, Missouri	St. Louis Arena
Tacoma Stars	Tacoma, Washington	Tacoma Dome
Wichita Wings	Wichita, Kansas	Kansas Coliseum

== Map of clubs ==
Eastern Division Western Division

== Regular season schedule ==
The 1986–87 regular season schedule ran from November 13, 1986, to May 3, 1987. The schedule was lengthened to 52 games per team, the longest to date in MISL history.

== Final standings ==
Playoff teams in bold.

Eastern Division	W	L	Pct.	GB	GF	GA	Home	Road
**Cleveland Force**	34	18	.654	--	252	218	20-6	14-12
**Baltimore Blast**	33	19	.635	1	239	201	20-6	13-13
**Dallas Sidekicks**	28	24	.538	6	209	197	15-11	13-13
**Minnesota Strikers**	26	26	.500	8	205	198	14-12	12-14
Chicago Sting	23	29	.442	11	263	265	15-11	8-18
New York Express	3	23	.115	18	97	159	2-11	1-12

Western Division	W	L	Pct.	GB	GF	GA	Home	Road
**Tacoma Stars**	35	17	.673	--	249	211	17-9	18-8
**Kansas City Comets**	28	24	.538	7	271	253	18-8	10-16
**San Diego Sockers**	27	25	.519	8	214	200	16-10	11-15
**Wichita Wings**	27	25	.519	8	268	265	18-8	9-17
St. Louis Steamers	19	33	.365	16	195	224	13-13	6-20
Los Angeles Lazers	16	36	.308	19	183	254	12-14	4-22

== Playoffs ==
Division Semifinals
E1	Cleveland Force	3
E4	Minnesota Strikers	2
E2	Baltimore Blast	2
E3	Dallas Sidekicks	3
W1	Tacoma Stars	3
W4	Wichita Wings	2
W2	Kansas City Comets	2
W3	San Diego Sockers	3

Division Finals
E1	Cleveland Force	1
E3	Dallas Sidekicks	4
W1	Tacoma Stars	4
W3	San Diego Sockers	3

Championship Series
E3	Dallas Sidekicks	4
W1	Tacoma Stars	3

=== Division Semifinals ===
Cleveland vs. Minnesota
Date	Away	Home	Attendance
May 9	**Minnesota 5**	Cleveland 4	11,461
	Hector Marinaro scored at 2:07 of overtime
May 10	Minnesota 6	**Cleveland 7**	7,165
May 13	**Cleveland 6**	Minnesota 5	5,766
	Michael King scored at 12:55 of overtime
May 16	Cleveland 4	**Minnesota 5**	6,888
May 19	Minnesota 3	**Cleveland 7**	11,808
**Cleveland wins series 3-2**

Baltimore vs. Dallas
Date	Away	Home	Attendance
May 7	Dallas 2	**Baltimore 3**	6,224
May 9	**Dallas 7**	Baltimore 6	7,306
May 15	**Baltimore 3**	Dallas 2	9,182
	Andy Chapman scored at 1:54 of overtime
May 17	Baltimore 3	**Dallas 4**	5,149
	Tatu scored at 4:53 of overtime
May 19	**Dallas 7**	Baltimore 4	7,918
**Dallas wins series 3-2**

Tacoma vs. Wichita
Date	Away	Home	Attendance
May 6	Wichita 7	**Tacoma 9**	9,385
May 8	Wichita 1	**Tacoma 9**	11,842
May 10	Tacoma 3	**Wichita 10**	6,846
May 13	Tacoma 2	**Wichita 6**	9,023
May 14	Wichita 2	**Tacoma 4**	7,254
**Tacoma wins series 3-2**

Kansas City vs. San Diego
Date	Away	Home	Attendance
May 7	**San Diego 5**	Kansas City 4	8,141
	Waad Hirmez scored at 5:58 of overtime
May 10	San Diego 1	**Kansas City 5**	8,127
May 12	**Kansas City 9**	San Diego 7	7,685
May 17	Kansas City 2	**San Diego 5**	7,946
May 20	**San Diego 9**	Kansas City 5	11,136
**San Diego wins series 3-2**

=== Division Finals ===
Cleveland vs. Dallas
Date	Away	Home	Attendance
May 23	Dallas 3	**Cleveland 5**	12,034
May 24	**Dallas 9**	Cleveland 6	13,051
May 27	Cleveland 2	**Dallas 5**	9,107
May 29	Cleveland 4	**Dallas 9**	16,824
May 31	**Dallas 4**	Cleveland 3	8,859
**Dallas wins series 4-1**

Tacoma vs. San Diego
Date	Away	Home	Attendance
May 22	**San Diego 6**	Tacoma 5	11,884
May 24	San Diego 2	**Tacoma 7**	9,055
May 27	**Tacoma 3**	San Diego 2	9,704
May 30	Tacoma 2	**San Diego 6**	11,436
May 31	**San Diego 6**	Tacoma 5	12,934
June 2	**Tacoma 4**	San Diego 3	12,884
June 4	San Diego 5	**Tacoma 8**	16,054
**Tacoma wins series 4-3**

=== Championship Series ===
Tacoma vs. Dallas
Date	Away	Home	Attendance
June 9	Dallas 4	**Tacoma 10**	11,496
June 11	Dallas 4	**Tacoma 7**	14,643
June 13	Tacoma 3	**Dallas 5**	16,824
June 14	Tacoma 3	**Dallas 6**	13,597
June 16	Dallas 3	**Tacoma 5**	20,284
June 18	Tacoma 4	**Dallas 5**	16,824
	Mark Karpun scored at 20:30 of overtime
June 20	**Dallas 4**	Tacoma 3	21,728
	Mark Karpun scored at 9:23 of overtime
**Dallas wins series 4-3**

== Regular season player statistics ==
=== Scoring leaders ===
GP = Games Played, G = Goals, A = Assists, Pts = Points

Player	Team	GP	G	A	Pts
Tatu	Dallas Sidekicks	51	73	38	111
Jan Goossens	Minnesota Strikers	45	51	44	95
Kai Haaskivi	Cleveland Force	49	34	55	89
Steve Zungul	Tacoma Stars	51	42	47	89
Preki	Tacoma Stars	51	41	47	88
Chico Borja	Wichita Wings	46	51	36	87
Batata	Chicago Sting	52	37	48	85
Godfrey Ingram	Tacoma Stars	51	52	29	81
Dale Mitchell	Kansas City Comets	48	51	24	75
Branko Segota	San Diego Sockers	38	34	41	75

=== Leading Goalkeepers ===
Note: GP = Games played; Min – Minutes played; GA = Goals against; GAA = Goals against average; W = Wins; L = Losses

Player	Team	GP	Min	GA	GAA	W	L
Tino Lettieri	Minnesota Strikers	35	2058	116	3.38	15	19
Krys Sobieski	Dallas Sidekicks	43	2525	145	3.45	24	19
Scott Manning	Baltimore Blast	24	1314	76	3.47	14	9
Zoltán Tóth	San Diego Sockers	33	1875	110	3.52	17	13
Jim Gorsek	San Diego Sockers	25	1265	82	3.89	10	12
Keith Van Eron	Baltimore Blast	26	1390	91	3.93	15	6
Joe Papaleo	Tacoma Stars	31	1808	120	3.98	22	9
Slobo Illjevski	St. Louis Steamers	46	2631	176	4.01	16	28
Cris Vaccaro	Cleveland Force	36	2012	116	4.02	20	9
P.J. Johns	Cleveland Force	24	1406	95	4.05	14	8

== Playoff Player Statistics ==
=== Scoring leaders ===
GP = Games Played, G = Goals, A = Assists, Pts = Points

Player	Team	GP	G	A	Pts
Tatu	Dallas Sidekicks	17	22	16	38
Steve Zungul	Tacoma Stars	19	21	17	38
Preki	Tacoma Stars	17	19	18	37
Branko Segota	San Diego Sockers	10	19	12	31
Gary Heale	Tacoma Stars	19	17	7	24

=== Leading Goalkeepers ===
Note: GP = Games played; Min – Minutes played; GA = Goals against; GAA = Goals against average; W = Wins; L = Losses

Player	Team	GP	Min	GA	GAA	W	L
Joe Papaleo	Tacoma Stars	9	535	32	3.59	5	4
Scott Manning	Baltimore Blast	4	187	12	3.84	1	2
Krys Sobieski	Dallas Sidekicks	16	989	70	4.25	11	5
Zoltán Tóth	San Diego Sockers	11	544	39	4.30	5	5
Tino Lettieri	Minnesota Strikers	5	302	23	4.56	2	3

== All-MISL Teams ==
First Team	Position	Second Team
Krys Sobieski, Dallas	G	Tino Lettieri, Minnesota
Bruce Savage, Baltimore	D	Bernie James, Cleveland
Fernando Clavijo, San Diego	D	Kevin Crow, San Diego
Kai Haaskivi, Cleveland	M	Branko Segota, San Diego
Tatu, Dallas	F	Jan Goossens, Kansas City
Steve Zungul, Tacoma	F	Preki, Tacoma

Honorable Mention	Position
David Brcic, Los Angeles	G
Neil Megson, Tacoma	D
Victor Moreland, Dallas	D
Chico Borja, Wichita	M
Godfrey Ingram, Tacoma	F
Batata, Chicago	F

== League awards ==
- Most Valuable Player: Tatu, Dallas
- Scoring Champion: Tatu, Dallas
- Pass Master: Kai Haaskivi, Cleveland
- Defender of the Year: Bruce Savage, Baltimore
- Rookie of the Year: John Stollmeyer, Cleveland
- Newcomer of the Year: Steve Kinsey, Minnesota
- Goalkeeper of the Year: Tino Lettieri, Minnesota
- Coach of the Year: Dave Clements, Kansas City
- Championship Series Most Valuable Player: Tatu, Dallas

== Team attendance totals ==
Club	Games	Total	Average
Cleveland Force	26	366,887	14,111
Kansas City Comets	26	323,622	12,447
Tacoma Stars	26	269,974	10,384
Baltimore Blast	26	258,333	9,936
San Diego Sockers	26	253,444	9,748
Dallas Sidekicks	26	224,536	8,636
Wichita Wings	26	209,800	8,069
St. Louis Steamers	26	182,984	7,038
Minnesota Strikers	26	181,441	6,977
Chicago Sting	26	152,861	5,879
New York Express	13	67,752	5,212
Los Angeles Lazers	26	113,831	4,376
**OVERALL**	**299**	**2,605,465**	**8,714**
