= Luis Alberto (footballer, born 1943) =

Argentine footballer (born 1943)

Personal information
- Date of birth: October 6, 1943 (age 83)
- Place of birth: Santiago del Estero, Argentina
- Positions: Midfielder; striker

Senior career*
Years	Team	Apps	(Gls)
1978–1982	New York Arrows (indoor)	98	(60)
1979	→ Rochester Lancers (loan)	22	(1)
1982–1983	Cleveland Force (indoor)	47	(20)
1983–1984	Pittsburgh Spirit (indoor)	30	(6)
1985	New York Cosmos (indoor)	13	(4)
1985	Wichita Wings (indoor)	13	(3)
1986–1987	New York Express (indoor)	10	(2)
- * Club domestic league appearances and goals

Luis Alberto (born October 6, 1943) is an Argentinian former football player.

In 1978, Alberto signed with the New York Arrows of the Major Indoor Soccer League. He won three MISL championships with the Arrows. In 1979, he played on loan to the Rochester Lancers of the North American Soccer League. On February 10, 1982, the Arrows sold Alberto's contract to the Cleveland Force. On May 19, 1983, the force traded him to the Pittsburgh Spirit in exchange for Krys Sobieski. On January 4, 1985, he signed with the New York Cosmos, now playing in the MISL. The Cosmos withdrew from the league in February 1985 and released Alberto. In March, he signed with the Wichita Wings and finished the season there. In 1986, Alberto returned to New York to join the expansion New York Express which collapsed two-thirds of the way through the season.
