= Alex Tarnoczi =

Hungarian footballer

Alex Tarnóczi
Personal information
- Full name: Sándor Alexsandor Tarnóczi
- Date of birth: 29 July 1959 (age 67)
- Place of birth: Budapest, Hungary
- Height: 5 ft 10 in (1.78 m)
- Positions: Midfielder; forward

Senior career*
Years	Team	Apps	(Gls)
1978–1979	Csepel	7	(3)
1980	Csepel	13	(5)
1980–1981	Hartford Hellions (indoor)	31	(24)
1981	New York Arrows (indoor)	8	(1)
1981–1983	Buffalo Stallions (indoor)	66	(39)
1983–1984	Memphis Americans (indoor)	23	(9)
1984–1986	Cleveland Force (indoor)	83	(24)
1986	New York Express (indoor)	9	(3)
1987	Dallas Sidekicks (indoor)	7	(0)
1988–1989	Canton Invaders (indoor)		
1989–1990	Dayton Dynamo (indoor)		
1990–1991	Chicago Power (indoor)	30	(13)
1992–1993	Canton Invaders (indoor)	22	(11)
- * Club domestic league appearances and goals

Sándor "Alex" Tarnóczi is a retired Hungarian football (soccer) player who spent eleven seasons in the Major Indoor Soccer League and American Indoor Soccer Association.

Tarnoczi, a native of communist Hungary, fled his country along with Julie Hegyi for the United States in November 1980. At the time, both were playing for Csepel SC on a tour of Yugoslavia. The two men walked away from their team and took a flight to Rome where they contacted agents of the Hartford Hellions of the Major Indoor Soccer League. The Hellions then signed them both and cleared their way for immigration into the United States. Tarnoczi spent one season with Hartford. He moved to the New York Arrows for the 1981–1982 season. On 24 December 1981, the Buffalo Stallions purchased Tarnoczi's contract from the Arrows. He began the 1982–1983 season in Buffalo before moving to the Cleveland Force during the season. On 12 December 1986, the Force traded Tarnoczi to the New York Express for a first-round draft pick in the 1987 draft. The Express withdrew from the league and folded at the All Star break. On 13 March 1987, the Dallas Sidekicks signed Tarnoczi on a ten-day contract. Six days later, they placed him on a contract until the end of the season. Tarnoczi then joined the Canton Invaders of the American Indoor Soccer Association. He was captain of the Invaders during their 1988-1989 championship season. In the fall of 1989, Tarnoczi joined the Dayton Dynamo. In January 1990, he moved to the Chicago Power. He began the 1990–1991 season with Chicago. He played the 1992–1993 season with the Invaders.
