= Shermer =

Shermer may refer to:

- Shermer High School, a fictional high school used in John Hughes' movies and set in the fictional town of Shermer, Illinois
- Michael Shermer, American writer
- Kirk Shermer, American soccer goalkeeper
