= Mark White (soccer, born 1961) =

American soccer player

Personal information
- Date of birth: December 5, 1961 (age 64)
- Place of birth: New Orleans, Louisiana, United States
- Height: 6 ft 4 in (1.93 m)
- Position: Goalkeeper

Senior career*
Years	Team	Apps	(Gls)
1980–1981	Baltimore Blast (indoor)	1	(0)
1981–1982	Philadelphia Fever (indoor)	14	(0)
–1985	Ope IF		
1986–1987	Hammarby	13	(0)
1986–1987	→ Dallas Sidekicks (loan)	6	(0)
1990–1991	Fort Worth Kickers		

International career
1981	U.S. U-20		
- * Club domestic league appearances and goals

Mark White is a retired American soccer goalkeeper who played professionally in the Allsvenskan, Major Indoor Soccer League and Southwest Independent Soccer League.

In 1980, White signed with the expansion Baltimore Blast of the Major Indoor Soccer League. He moved to the Philadelphia Fever in 1981. That year, he was a member of the United States men's national under-20 soccer team at the 1981 FIFA World Youth Championship. He was an unused substitute in all three American games. In 1986, White joined Hammarby IF of the Swedish Allsvenskan. He started thirteen games, then was sent on loan to the Dallas Sidekicks. Hammarby released him at the end of the season and White remained in the Dallas area. In 1990 and 1991, he played for the Fort Worth Kickers of the Southwest Independent Soccer League.
