= 1989 Major Indoor Soccer League All-Star Game =

1989 MISL All-Star Game
MISL All-Stars	Dallas Sidekicks
(United States)	(Texas)
8	1
- Date: February 22, 1989
- Venue: Reunion Arena, Dallas, Texas
- Most Valuable Player: Preki (Tacoma Stars)
- Referee: Esse Baharmast
- Attendance: 10,435

The 1989 Major Indoor Soccer League All-Star Game was the 10th playing of the league's mid-season game featuring the all-stars of the original Major Indoor Soccer League (MISL). The game was held on February 22, 1989, at Reunion Arena in Dallas, Texas, the home of the Dallas Sidekicks. Dallas had been chosen by the league to host the game in February 1987, beating out competing bids by Baltimore and San Diego.

Because the MISL had contracted to just seven teams, the format of the game was changed from division versus division to the league's all-stars versus the hometown Dallas Sidekicks. To avoid a conflict of interest, the Sidekicks players were not allowed to participate in the selection of that season's all-star team. The game resulted in the MISL All-Stars defeating the Sidekicks 8–1.

The Dallas Sidekicks were coached by Gordon Jago. The game was officiated by senior referee Esse Baharmast, referee Kelly Mock, and assistant referee Manuel Ortiz, Sr. The game's most valuable player was Preki of the Tacoma Stars. The official attendance for the game was announced as 10,435.

== Score by periods ==
Score by Periods:	1	2	3	4	Final
MISL-All Star	3	1	0	4	8
Dallas Sidekicks	0	1	0	0	1
