= Troy Snyder =

American soccer player (born 1965)

Personal information
- Date of birth: November 24, 1965 (age 60)
- Place of birth: Reading, Pennsylvania, U.S.
- Height: 5 ft 11 in (1.80 m)
- Positions: Defender; midfielder; forward

College career
Years	Team	Apps	(Gls)
1984–1986	Penn State Nittany Lions		

Senior career*
Years	Team	Apps	(Gls)
1987	San Diego Nomads		
1987–1988	Minnesota Strikers (indoor)	40	(5)
1988–1992	Dallas Sidekicks (indoor)	210	(46)
1989	Maryland Bays		
1993–1997	Washington Warthogs (indoor)	98	(14)
1997–1998	Baltimore Bays (indoor)		
1998–1999	Baltimore Blast (indoor)	28	(4)

International career
- U.S. U-20
1985–1991	United States	5	(0)
1987–1996	U.S. Futsal	9	(1)

Managerial career
- 1998–2000: Goucher Gophers
- * Club domestic league appearances and goals

Troy Snyder (born November 24, 1965) is a former U.S. soccer player who is second on the high school career scoring list with 208 goals and 117 assists. He spent most of his career playing indoor soccer, but also won an outdoor title in 1987 with the San Diego Nomads. Snyder earned five caps with the U.S. national team between 1985 and 1991 as well as another nine with the U.S. National Futsal Team. In 1983, he was a member of the U.S. team at the U-20 World Championship.

Snyder is currently the president and part-owner of Reading United AC in USL League Two.

== Player ==
=== Youth ===
Snyder attended Fleetwood Area High School in Fleetwood, Pennsylvania, where he played as a forward on his school's soccer team. During his high school soccer career, which ran from 1980 to 1983, he scored 208 goals and assisted on 117 others. At the time, the 208 goals was a record, which has since been broken.. Following graduation from high school, Snyder attended Pennsylvania State University where he played for legendary coach Walter Bahr from 1984 to 1986.

=== Professional ===
In 1987, Snyder turned professional as a midfielder with the San Diego Nomads of the Western Soccer Alliance (WSA). That season, the Nomads took the WSA title with a 3–1 win over the San Jose Earthquakes. That winter, he signed with the Minnesota Strikers of the Major Indoor Soccer League (MISL). The Strikers folded at the end of the 1987–1988 season. Now out of a team, Snyder signed with the Dallas Sidekicks as a free agent. He would go on to play four seasons and 210 games in Dallas. In addition to playing for Dallas, Snyder spent the 1989 outdoor season with the Maryland Bays of the American Soccer League.

In 1992, Snyder left the Sidekicks and moved east to the Washington Warthogs of the Continental Indoor Soccer League (CISL). He was recognized as the CISL Defender of the Year for the 1996–1997 season. However, the Warthogs and the league folded at the end of that season and Snyder moved to the Baltimore Bays of the USISL. He spent the 1997–1998 indoor USISL season with the Bays, winning the league championship before the team folded. He then moved to the Baltimore Blast of the National Professional Soccer League (NPSL).

=== National team ===
In 1983, Snyder was selected for the United States U-20 men's national soccer team which competed at the U-20 World Championship. The U.S. went 1-0-2 and failed to make the second round. On June 15, 1985, the summer before his junior year of college, Snyder earned his first cap in a 5–0 loss to England. He was not called into the national team again until May 5, 1991, when he came on as a substitute for Janusz Michallik in a 1–0 win over Uruguay. He played three more times that year, all as a substitute. His last game with the national team came in a 2–0 win over Romania in Brașov. In addition to his five caps with the outdoor national team, Snyder earned another nine caps, and scored one goal, with the United States national futsal team from 1987 to 1996.
