= David Stride =

English footballer (1958–2016)

Personal information
- Date of birth: 14 March 1958
- Place of birth: Lymington, England
- Date of death: 10 July 2016 (aged 58)
- Position: Defender

Youth career
- Chelsea

Senior career*
Years	Team	Apps	(Gls)
1978–1980	Chelsea	35	(0)
1978	→ Memphis Rogues (loan)	24	(1)
1979–1980	Memphis Rogues (indoor)	12	(6)
1980	Memphis Rogues	21	(1)
1980–1981	Calgary Boomers (indoor)	17	(1)
1981	Minnesota Kicks	29	(5)
1981–1982	Cleveland Force (indoor)	14	(0)
1982	Jacksonville Tea Men	22	(1)
1982–1984	Millwall	55	(3)
1984–1985	Leyton Orient	29	(0)
1985–1988	Dallas Sidekicks (indoor)	117	(13)
- Wellworthy Athletic
- AFC Lymington

Managerial career
- Lymington Town
- 2015: Bashley
- * Club domestic league appearances and goals

David Stride (14 March 1958 – 10 July 2016) was an English professional footballer who played as a defender in both England and the United States.

== Playing career ==
Stride began his career with Chelsea in 1978. That year, he went on loan with the Memphis Rogues of the North American Soccer League. In 1980, Chelsea sold Stride's contract to the Rogues. In 1981, Memphis sent him to the Minnesota Kicks. In the fall of 1981, he signed with the Cleveland Force of the Major Indoor Soccer League. In 1982, he moved to the Jacksonville Tea Men. Following the 1982 NASL season, Stride returned to England to play for Millwall and Leyton Orient. In 1985, he returned to the United States to play for the Dallas Sidekicks of Major Indoor Soccer League.

== Managerial career ==
In the 2000s, Stride co-managed Lymington Town alongside John Pyatt when the club competed in the Hampshire League. In 2015, Stride was sacked by Bashley after just 40 days in the job for "a run of poor pre-season results and lack of player signings" after overseeing just two friendly losses in his time at the club. Stride described the debacle as "absolute codswallop".

== Death ==
Stride died of a heart attack on 10 July 2016.

== Honours ==
Millwall

- Football League Group Cup: 1982–83
