= Mark Evans (soccer) =

American soccer player (born 1962)

Personal information
- Date of birth: April 10, 1962 (age 64)
- Place of birth: Anglesey, North Wales
- Height: 6 ft 0 in (1.83 m)
- Position: Defender

College career
Years	Team	Apps	(Gls)
1982–1983	El Camino Warriors		

Senior career*
Years	Team	Apps	(Gls)
1984–1986	Dallas Sidekicks (indoor)	65	(4)
1986–1987	Milwaukee Wave (indoor)	19	(5)
1987–1988	Wichita Wings (indoor)	85	(9)
1989–1990	Los Angeles Heat		
1989–1990	Milwaukee Wave (indoor)	16	(4)
1993	Los Angeles United (indoor)	20	(3)
- * Club domestic league appearances and goals

Mark Evans is an American retired soccer defender who spent most of his career in the American indoor leagues.

Evans attended El Camino College where he was a 1982 National Junior College All American. Between late 1982-84 Evans was a regular on the Olympic Development Team. Evans traveled and played with the team inside and outside the United States. Other countries included: Honduras, China, Sweden, Finland & Malaysia. Unfortunately for Evans he did not get to the 84 games in Los Angeles. He was one of 8 amateur at that time to be cut and replaced by professional players.

On October 2, 1984, Evans signed as a free agent with the expansion Dallas Sidekicks of the Major Indoor Soccer League. He spent two seasons with Dallas then moved to the Milwaukee Wave of the American Indoor Soccer Association for the beginning of the 1986–1987 season. In January 1987, the Wichita Wings purchased Evans contract from the Wave. In 1988, Evans moved back to Los Angeles. In 1989, he played for the Los Angeles Heat in the Western Soccer League. On October 30, 1989, Evans rejoined the Milwaukee Wave for about half of the AISA season. In 1990, he again spent the summer with the Heat, now playing in the American Professional Soccer League. In July 1990, he was injured and lost for the rest of the season. Evans retired from professional soccer, but returned in 1993 for a single season with the Los Angeles United of the Continental Indoor Soccer League.
