= Joe Papaleo =

American soccer player and coach

Personal information
- Date of birth: October 7, 1961 (age 65)
- Place of birth: New York, United States
- Height: 5 ft 11 in (1.80 m)
- Position: Goalkeeper

Youth career
- 1980–1982: Syracuse Orange

Senior career*
Years	Team	Apps	(Gls)
1982–1986	Pittsburgh Spirit (indoor)	62	(0)
1986–1987	Tacoma Stars (indoor)	31	(0)
1987–1994	Dallas Sidekicks (indoor)	178	(0)
1995	Pittsburgh Stingers (indoor)	18	(0)
Total		289	(0)

Managerial career
- 2012: Syracuse Silver Knights (Assistant)
- * Club domestic league appearances and goals

Joe Papaleo (born October 7, 1961) is a retired American soccer goalkeeper who played professionally in the Major Indoor Soccer League and the Continental Indoor Soccer League. He was the 1990 MISL Goalkeeper of the Year and the 1993 CISL Goalkeeper of the Year. He currently coaches the Christian Brothers Academy boys' soccer team and is the former coach of the Syracuse Silver Knights Academy team. In 2012, he became the Goalkeeper coach for the MISL team the Syracuse Silver Knights.

== Youth ==
In 1979, Papaleo graduated from Christian Brothers Academy where he was a three-time All-Central New York and one-time All State soccer player. He was inducted into the CBA Hall of Fame in 2001. Papaleo attended Syracuse University, playing on the men's soccer team from 1980 to 1982. He was a 1982 Third Team NSCAA All American and the Soccer America Goalkeeper of the Year. Papaleo set school records for career 44 and season wins with 44 and career shutouts with 36.

== Professional ==
In 1982, the New York Cosmos selected Papaleo in the first round (first overall) of the North American Soccer League (1968-1984) draft. However, the Pittsburgh Spirit of the Major Indoor Soccer League also drafted him in the first round (first overall) of the MISL Draft. When the Cosmos informed Papaleo that he would be confined to the Cosmos reserve and indoor teams for at least three years, he chose to sign with Pittsburgh. He played for the Spirit until 1986 when he moved to the Tacoma Stars. After one season in Tacoma, the Stars released Papaleo in a salary reduction effort. On July 30, 1987, he signed as a free agent with the Dallas Sidekicks. He was the 1990 MISL Goalkeeper of the Year. The MISL collapsed at the end of the 1991–1992 season and the Sidekicks moved to the Continental Indoor Soccer League. Papaleo was the 1993 CISL Goalkeeper of the Year. Papaleo wore number 91. In 1989, he met Nick Veason an eleven-year-old soccer player dying of AIDS. He then changed his jersey number to 61. This was in honor of Veason's birthday of June 1. Papaleo visited Veason every day during his last five weeks alive. He died on October 28, 1990. Papaleo, Billy Phillips and Sidekicks' equipment manager Chris Agnes were pallbearers at his funeral. In 1995, the Sidekicks traded Papaleo to the Pittsburgh Stingers, but he retired soon after.

== Coach ==
Following his retirement in 1995, Papaleo returned to Syracuse to become the head coach of the Christian Brothers Academy boys' soccer team. Over the years, his teams have won two New York State High School championships and he was the 2001 New York State Private School Coach of the Year.

In 2005, Papaleo was inducted into the Greater Syracuse Sports Hall of Fame.

Since 2010 to date, Papaleo has been the head coach for player skills development training for the Fayetteville-Manlius Soccer Club Travel Program.

In 2012, Papaleo became the assistant coach for the Syracuse Silver Knights.

In 2014's summer Papaleo coached Syracuse Developmental Academy boys u16 and u17 teams.
