= Willie Molano =

Colombian footballer (born 1961)

Personal information
- Full name: William Molano
- Date of birth: March 21, 1961 (age 65)
- Place of birth: Bogotá, Colombia
- Height: 5 ft 7 in (1.70 m)
- Positions: Forward; midfielder

College career
Years	Team	Apps	(Gls)
1980–1981	Foothill Owls		

Senior career*
Years	Team	Apps	(Gls)
1982–1987	Los Angeles Lazers (indoor)	143	(73)
1987–1990	Dallas Sidekick (indoor)	109	(63)
1990–1991	Tacoma Stars (indoor)	50	(9)
1992	Milwaukee Wave (indoor)	7	(4)
1992	Dallas Rockets		
1993–1994	Texas Lightning (indoor)	9	(17)
1994	Houston Hotshots (indoor)	17	(10)
- * Club domestic league appearances and goals

Willie Molano is a retired Colombian association football player who played professionally in the Major Indoor Soccer League and National Professional Soccer League.

Molano attended Foothill College where he was a 1981 First Team NJCAA All American. In 1982, the Los Angeles Lazers selected Molano in the second round of the Major Indoor Soccer League draft. In 1983, the San Diego Sockers selected Molano in the North American Soccer League draft, but Molano did not play for them. On March 4, 1987, the Lazers traded Molano to the Dallas Sidekick just before the playoffs in exchange for Marcio Leite. In 1990, he moved to the Tacoma Stars. In February 1992, Molano played for the Milwaukee Wave of the National Professional Soccer League. During the summer of 1992, Molano played for the Dallas Rockets of the USISL. Molano then moved to the Texas Lightning for the 1993–94 USISL indoor season. In 1994, he finished his career with the Houston Hotshots of the Continental Indoor Soccer League.

In 1996, Molano founded the DFW Tejanos Soccer Club In 2014, DFW Tejanos Soccer Club merged with the Dallas Texans Soccer Club.
