= Hank Henry (soccer) =

American soccer player

Personal information
- Date of birth: December 19, 1964 (age 61)
- Place of birth: Dallas, Texas, U.S.
- Height: 5 ft 11 in (1.80 m)
- Positions: Goalkeeper; midfielder

Youth career
- 1984–1987: SMU Mustangs

Senior career*
Years	Team	Apps	(Gls)
1988–1989	Dallas Sidekicks (indoor)	4	(0)
1989–1990	Atlanta Attack (indoor)		
1990–1991	Baltimore Blast (indoor)	19	(0)
1991–1992	Dallas Sidekicks (indoor)	17	(0)
1994–1997	Dallas Sidekicks (indoor)	36	(0)
- * Club domestic league appearances and goals

Hank Henry is an American retired soccer player who played professionally in the Major Indoor Soccer League and Continental Indoor Soccer League.

Henry attended Southern Methodist University, playing on the men's soccer team from 1984 to 1987. He graduated with a bachelor's degree in public relations. In 1988, Henry attended an open tryout with the Dallas Sidekicks and was signed to the team's developmental squad. Over two years, he played four regular season games. The Sidekicks released him in December 1989. On December 22, 1989, Henry with the Atlanta Attack of the American Indoor Soccer Association for the remainder of the season. In November 1990, the Baltimore Blast brought him in for a one-day trial. That led the team to signing him as a backup for the 1990–1991 season. The Blast released Henry in September 1991 and he returned to the Dallas Sidekicks for the 1991–1992 season. During the 1991–1992 season, Henry played nine games in goal and another eight as a midfielder. The Sidekicks again released him, but in 1994 Henry rejoined Dallas, which was no playing in the Continental Indoor Soccer League. In 1995, he had his best season, winning all ten games he played in goal. He works at Riverbend Sandler Pools. Hip replacement in 2015
