= Kirk Shermer =

American soccer player

Personal information
- Date of birth: October 13, 1960 (age 66)
- Place of birth: Fresno, California, United States
- Position: Goalkeeper

College career
Years	Team	Apps	(Gls)
1978–1981	Fresno State Bulldogs		

Senior career*
Years	Team	Apps	(Gls)
1982–1984	Los Angeles Lazers (indoor)	44	(0)
- * Club domestic league appearances and goals

Kirk Shermer is a retired American soccer goalkeeper who was the 1983 Major Indoor Soccer League Rookie of the Year.

Shermer attended Fresno State University where he played on the men's soccer from 1978 to 1981. He was a 1981 Second Team All American. On December 14, 1981, the Tampa Bay Rowdies selected Shermer in the fourth round of the North American Soccer League college draft. He did not sign with the Rowdies. In 1982, the Los Angeles Lazers selected Shermer in the Major Indoor Soccer League draft. He rapidly asserted himself as a top goalkeeper and was named the 1983 MISL Rookie of the Year. He began the 1983–1984 season, played eleven games, then retired.
