= Steve Gardner (footballer, born 1958) =

English footballer

Personal information
- Full name: Stephen David Gardner
- Date of birth: 7 October 1958 (age 68)
- Place of birth: Hemsworth, England
- Height: 5 ft 11 in (1.80 m)
- Positions: Midfielder; striker

Youth career
- –1975: Ipswich Town

Senior career*
Years	Team	Apps	(Gls)
1975–1977	Ipswich Town	0	(0)
1977–1981	Oldham Athletic	53	(2)
1981–1982	Karlskrona		
1983–1984	IFK Göteborg	27	(7)
1984	Dallas Sidekicks	16	(3)
1985–1988	GAIS	83	(24)
- * Club domestic league appearances and goals

Stephen David Gardner (born 7 October 1958) is an English former professional footballer who played as a midfielder and striker. He played for Ipswich Town and Oldham Athletic in England, Karlskrona, IFK Göteborg and GAIS in Sweden, as well as the Dallas Sidekicks in America.
