= Mark Karpun =

Canadian soccer player

Personal information
- Full name: Mark Edward Karpun
- Date of birth: 12 June 1963 (age 63)
- Place of birth: Vancouver, British Columbia, Canada
- Height: 6 ft 1 in (1.85 m)
- Position: Forward

Youth career
- 1976: B.C. Travellers
- 1980–81: McNair High School
- 1980–82: Richmond Olympic

Senior career*
Years	Team	Apps	(Gls)
1981	Calgary Boomers (reserve team)		
1982–1983	Rowdies II (reserve team)	12	(16)
1983–1984	Tampa Bay Rowdies (indoor)	34	(23)
1983–1984	Tampa Bay Rowdies	27	(6)
1984–1990	Dallas Sidekicks (indoor)	249	(146)
1989–1992	Vancouver 86ers	65	(9)
1990–1992	Tacoma Stars (indoor)	76	(48)

International career
1983–1986	Canada	2	(0)
- * Club domestic league appearances and goals

Mark Edward Karpun (born June 12, 1963) is a Canadian retired soccer player that played in the North American Soccer League, the Major Indoor Soccer League the Canadian Soccer League and for the Canadian Men's National Team. He is also noted for having twice scored the golden goal of sudden-death overtime to win an indoor championship final.

== Early life ==
Mark Karpun was born in Vancouver, British Columbia. He played for B.C. Travellers at age 13, and later for McNair High School in Richmond, B.C.

== North American Soccer League ==
Karpun was chosen straight out of McNair by the Calgary Boomers with the 17th pick of the first round of the 1981 NASL draft. He joined the Boomers in June after graduating high school and played on an amateur contract through the remainder of the 1981 season. While in Calgary he played exclusively on the reserve team, never appearing in an NASL match before the team folded at the end of the season.

Karpun was signed to the Tampa Bay Rowdies developmental squad, Rowdies II, in May 1982. With the Rowdies II he scored 16 goals in 12 matches. Following Gordon Jago’s resignation in July 1982, Karpun’s old coach in Calgary, Al Miller, was named the Rowdies’ new head coach. In late 1982 Karpun, and other Tampa Bay reservists received their first international experience when they trained for two months in Brazil with the world renowned club, São Paulo FC. Karpun's first chance to crack the Rowdies regular line up came during the 1983 indoor season. As unheralded young players go, Karpun did well, scoring 11 goals in 11 matches. This included his double overtime, game-winner in the Indoor Grand Prix finals versus the Montreal Manic.

His strong indoor play, coupled with rapidly shrinking NASL budgets, earned him a call up onto the Rowdies first-team roster midway through the 1983 outdoor season. Barely 20 years old at the time, he scored 5 times in 13 appearances. He continued to play for the Rowdies through the 1983–84 indoor and 1984 outdoor campaigns.

== Major Indoor Soccer League ==
With the collapse of the NASL immanent, Karpun signed with the expansion Dallas Sidekicks of the MISL in October 1984 prior to the 1984–85 season. This reunited him with several people from his time in Tampa Bay including Tatu, Wes McLeod, Perry Van der Beck and head coach, Gordon Jago, the man who had originally signed him to the Rowdies II squad. Karpun was a regular in the Sidekicks lineup in all but one of his six seasons in Dallas, when a knee injury early in the 1985–86 season limited him to 16 of 48 games that year.

In the 1987 MISL Finals against the heavily favored Tacoma Stars, he again proved to have the magic touch. In Game 6 he scored another double overtime, golden goal, this time to force a winner-take-all seventh game. Two nights later in Game 7 he redirected in the game-winner at 9:23 of overtime to give the Sidekicks their first ever indoor crown. In Dallas Sidekicks history, Karpun ranks fifth in goals (146), seventh in assists (76), and eighth in games played (249).

In September 1990 he signed with the Tacoma Stars to be closer to his family in Vancouver. Over two seasons with Tacoma he played in 76 games.

== Canadian Soccer League ==
Beginning in 1989 Karpun spent several summers playing outdoors with his hometown Vancouver 86ers in the Canadian Soccer League. During that time Vancouver won the regular season every year, the CSL Championship three times, and the 1990 North American club title as well. They were also CSL runners up in 1992. He retired from the sport in 1993.

== National team ==
Karpun wore the Canadian men's national team uniform several times between 1983 and 1986, but figured in only two matches, both as a substitute. He first played in the return leg of a 1983 Olympic qualifier versus Mexico on November 23 at Royal Athletic Park in Victoria, British Columbia. Karpun came on as a substitute in the 60th minute. He was part of the roster for the President's Cup in June 1985 but did not appear in either of Canada's two matches. He made his only other national team appearance as a substitute in a 3–0 international friendly loss to Mexico on April 27, 1986 at Estadio Azul, Mexico City.

== Personal life ==
He and his wife Daniela and have three children. Karpun is now employed as a captain in the Richmond Fire Department in the Metro Vancouver city of Richmond, British Columbia

== Honours ==
- North American Soccer League champion: 1983 (indoor)
- Major Indoor Soccer League champion: 1986–87
- Canadian Soccer League champion: 1989, 1990, 1991
- Canadian Soccer League regular season champion: 1989, 1990, 1991, 1992
- North American Club Championship: 1990
