= Krys Sobieski =

Polish footballer (1950–2025)

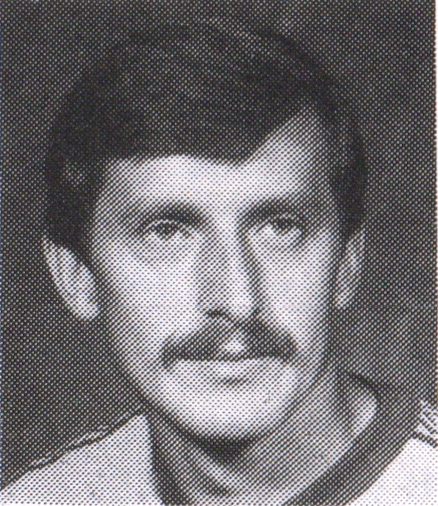
- Sobieski circa 1984

Personal information
- Full name: Krzysztof Zdzisław Sobieski
- Date of birth: 25 July 1950
- Place of birth: Wiskitki, Poland
- Date of death: 4 November 2025 (aged 75)
- Place of death: Dallas, Texas, U.S.
- Height: 1.79 m (5 ft 10 in)
- Position: Goalkeeper

Youth career
- 1964–1969: Pogoń Wiskitki

Senior career*
Years	Team	Apps	(Gls)
1969–1976	Ursus Warsaw		
1976–1981	Legia Warsaw	99	(0)
1981–1983	Pittsburgh Spirit (indoor)	70	(0)
1982–1985	Cleveland Force (indoor)	49	(0)
1985–1991	Dallas Sidekicks (indoor)	179	(0)

International career
1977	Poland	2	(0)

Managerial career
- 1989–1990: Dallas Sidekicks (assistant)
- 1992: Poland futsal
- 2000–2005: Dallas Burn (assistant)
- * Club domestic league appearances and goals

Krzysztof Zdzisław Sobieski (25 July 1950 – 4 November 2025) was a Polish professional footballer who played as a goalkeeper. He played professionally in Poland and the United States, including ten seasons in the Major Indoor Soccer League. He spent five seasons as the goalkeeper coach with the Dallas Burn of Major League Soccer.

== Club career ==
In 1964, Sobieski began his career with Pogoń Wiskitki. In 1969, he turned professional with lower division club Ursus Warsaw. In 1976, he moved to Legia Warsaw, winning the 1980 and 1981 Polish Cups. In the fall of 1981, Sobieski moved to the United States where he signed with the Pittsburgh Spirit of the Major Indoor Soccer League. On 19 May 1983, the Spirit traded Sobieski to the Cleveland Force in exchange for Luis Alberto. On 14 July 1985, the Force released Sobieski. On 20 August 1985, he signed as a free agent with the Dallas Sidekicks. In 1987, the Sidekicks won the league championship. Sobieski retired on 3 April 1991, having played six seasons with Dallas.

== International career ==
In June 1977, Sobieski earned two caps with the Poland national team in a South American tour. The first came in a match against Chile and the second in a match with Brazil.

== Coaching career ==
On 17 October 1989, Sobieski was named assistant coach of the Sidekicks, a position he held until 28 January 1990. In April 1992, he was named the head coach of the Poland national futsal team. He coached the team at the 1992 FIFA Futsal World Championship. Between 2000 and 2005, he served as an assistant coach with the Dallas Burn of Major League Soccer.

== Personal life and death ==
He was born 25 July 1950 in Wiskitki, Mazovia. He was diagnosed with Hodgkin's disease in 2010. He died in Dallas, Texas on 4 November 2025, at the age of 75.

== Honours ==
Legia Warsaw

- Polish Cup: 1979–80, 1980–81

Dallas Sidekicks

- Major Indoor Soccer League: 1986–87

Individual

- Major Indoor Soccer League Team of the Season: 1986–87
