= Doc Lawson =

Soccer player (born 1958)

Personal information
- Full name: Adolphus Lawson
- Date of birth: February 11, 1958 (age 68)
- Place of birth: Liberia
- Height: 6 ft 0 in (1.83 m)
- Position: Defender

Youth career
- 1976–1978: Southern Connecticut State University

Senior career*
Years	Team	Apps	(Gls)
1978–1979	Cincinnati Kids (indoor)	17	(9)
1979	San Jose Earthquakes	11	(1)
1979–1982	Philadelphia Fever (indoor)	93	(21)
1979–1980	San Diego Sockers	30	(1)
1982–1984	New York Arrows (indoor)	78	(8)
1984	New York Cosmos	1	(0)
1984–1985	New York Cosmos (indoor)	11	(5)
1985–1991	Dallas Sidekicks (indoor)	279	(74)
1992	Dallas Rockets		

International career
1979	United States	3	(0)
1989	U.S. Futsal	8	(1)
- * Club domestic league appearances and goals

Aldophus "Doc" Lawson (born February 11, 1958) is a former soccer player who played as a defender. He is best known for his long indoor career. Lawson played the third most games in the history of the original MISL. He also spent four seasons in the North American Soccer League. Known for his tenacious defending, Doc earned the nickname, The Indoor Warrior. Born in Liberia, Lawson earned three caps with the United States national team in 1979, was a member of the 1980 U.S. Olympic soccer team, and was with the U.S. Futsal team when it took third place in the 1989 FIFA Futsal World Championship.

== Youth career ==
While born in Liberia, Lawson moved with his family to the United States as a child. His family settled in Queens, New York where he began playing soccer at the age of fourteen. He attended Jamaica High School, earning the PSAL Iron Horse/Pegasus award for soccer for the 1975–76 season. Following graduation from high school in 1976, Lawson attended Southern Connecticut State University, playing on the men's soccer team from 1976 to 1978. He was the first Fighting Owl to receive All American recognition when he was named a third team All American in both 1977 and 1978. In 1978, he left college to turn professional.

== Professional career ==
Lawson signed with the Cincinnati Kids of Major Indoor Soccer League (MISL) in 1978 as both the team and league prepared for their first season. On December 22, 1978, Lawson played in the first game in MISL history as the Kids lost to the New York Arrows at Nassau Coliseum. The Kids folded at the end of the season, and Lawson moved to the Philadelphia Fever. In 1982, Lawson signed with the New York Arrows. The Arrows had dominated the league since its inception, but were now on a downward slide. Lawson played two seasons with them before they folded in 1984. He then moved to the New York Cosmos where he played the final NASL season. When the NASL folded in 1984, the Cosmos jumped to MISL for the 1984–85 season. However, they folded during the season. Lawson signed as a free agent with the Dallas Sidekicks on October 1, 1985. Lawson became one of only five players to have his jersey number retired by Dallas, having played for the Sidekicks for six seasons. He was an integral part of the 1986-87 MISL championship team. When he retired in 1991, he was the last active original member of MISL.

In addition to his long indoor career, Lawson also spent several seasons in the North American Soccer League. Following his first MISL season, Lawson moved west to sign with the San Jose Earthquakes for the 1979 NASL season. He was then traded to the San Diego Sockers and played the 1980 NASL outdoor season with them. He did not play outdoors again until 1984 when he signed with the New York Cosmos for the last year of the NASL.

He retired after the 1990–91 season and went into private business in Dallas. In 1992, he briefly played for the Dallas Rockets in the USISL.

== International career ==
Lawson earned three caps with the U.S. national team in October 1979. His first came in a 3–1 win over Bermuda on October 7. His second was a 3–0 loss France three days later and his last game was a 2–0 loss to Hungary on October 26.

Lawson was selected for the U.S. Olympic team as it began qualification for the 1980 Summer Olympics to be held in Moscow. Qualifications continued into 1980 and the U.S. ultimately qualified for the games, its first since the 1972 Summer Olympics. However, President Jimmy Carter declared that the United States would boycott the games after the Soviet Union invaded Afghanistan.

In 1989, Lawson played eight games, scoring one goal, with the United States national futsal team which competed in the first FIFA Futsal World Championship. The U.S. took third place.

== Post-playing career ==
Since retiring in 1991, Lawson has held several positions in the Texas soccer community. Lawson has also traveled back to his home country, Liberia, numerous times since his retirement, running camps to teach local children the game of soccer. In 2014, Lawson had to cut short a visit to Liberia due to the Ebola outbreak.
