= Mike Powers (soccer) =

American soccer player

Personal information
- Full name: Michael G. Powers
- Date of birth: December 22, 1957 (age 68)
- Place of birth: St. Louis, Missouri, U.S.
- Height: 5 ft 10 in (1.78 m)
- Positions: Midfielder; defender

College career
Years	Team	Apps	(Gls)
1976–1980	Rockhurst Hawks		

Senior career*
Years	Team	Apps	(Gls)
1980–1983	Wichita Wings (indoor)	37	(5)
1981–1983	Detroit Express		
1984–1985	Dallas Americans		
1986–2002	Dallas Sidekicks (indoor)	459	(61)

Managerial career
- 2002–2004: Dallas Sidekicks (assistant)
- 2012–2014: Dallas Sidekicks (assistant)
- * Club domestic league appearances and goals

Mike Powers is an American retired soccer midfielder who played sixteen years with the Dallas Sidekicks. He also played in the second American Soccer League and the United Soccer League.

== Player ==
=== Youth ===
Powers attended Rockhurst University, playing for the men/s soccer team from 1975 to 1980. He is a member of the school's Athletic Hall of Fame.

=== Professional ===
In 1979, the Wichita Wings selected Powers in the Territorial Round (10th overall) of the Major Indoor Soccer League Draft. He played from 1980 to 1983 with the Wings. In addition to playing indoors with the Wings, Powers also played three seasons, from 1981 to 1983 with the Detroit Express of the American Soccer League. The Express won the 1982 ASL championship.

Both the Express and the ASL collapsed at the end of the 1983 season and Powers moved to the Dallas Americans of the United Soccer League for two seasons. The Americans and the USL collapsed in 1985. In 1986, Powers attended an open trial with the Dallas Sidekicks. He performed well. Powers signed with the Dallas Sidekicks as a free Agent on October 30, 1986. In 1994, the Las Vegas Dustdevils picked Powers in the CISL Expansion Draft, but Powers refused to join the team. Therefore, in July 1994, the Dustdevils traded his rights back to the Sidekicks in exchange for Gary Young.

Powers remained with the Sidekicks until his retirement in February 2002. During his sixteen years in Dallas, the team moved from the original MISL to the Continental Indoor Soccer League (1993–1997) to the World Indoor Soccer League (1998–2001) to the second Major Indoor Soccer League (2002–2004).

== Coach ==
After his retirement, Powers spent two years as an assistant coach with the Sidekicks. In 2012, he returned to the relaunched Sidekicks as an assistant coach.

== Awards and honors ==
Powers was named to the Major Indoor Soccer League All-Star team in both 1989 and 1991. In October 2002, the Dallas Sidekicks retired his #5 jersey number. In October 2013, Powers was inducted into the St. Louis Soccer Hall of Fame.
