= Billy Phillips (soccer) =

American soccer player and coach

Personal information
- Full name: William L. Phillips
- Date of birth: August 9, 1956 (age 70)
- Place of birth: Long Island, New York, United States
- Height: 6 ft 1 in (1.85 m)
- Position: Goalkeeper

Youth career
- Nassau County Community College
- 1975–1978: Adelphi University

Senior career*
Years	Team	Apps	(Gls)
1980–1981	Dallas Tornado	14	(0)
1980–1981	Dallas Tornado (indoor)	17	(0)
1981–1982	Wichita Wings (indoor)	7	(0)
1982	San Jose Earthquakes	3	(0)
1982–1983	Golden Bay Earthquakes (indoor)	8	(0)
1983	Dallas Americans	10	(0)
1983–1984	St. Louis Steamers (indoor)	8	(0)
1984–1987	Dallas Sidekicks (indoor)	26	(0)

Managerial career
- 1987–89: Dallas Sidekicks (assistant)
- 1989–1991: Dallas Sidekicks
- 1992–96: Dallas Sidekicks (assistant)
- * Club domestic league appearances and goals

Billy Phillips (born August 9, 1956, in Long Island, New York) is a former U.S. soccer goalkeeper who played three seasons in the North American Soccer League, six in the Major Indoor Soccer League and later coached the Dallas Sidekicks for two seasons.

== College ==
Phillips was the youngest of five children.. He attended Nassau County Community College where he was named a soccer All-American. He then transferred to Adelphi University where he was a two-sport athlete, both running track and playing soccer. He earned a bachelor's degree in Physical Education in 1978. He still holds the school track record in the 1500 meter (3:46.1), the mile (4:02) and the two-mile relay. He earned All-American honors in 1978 when he finished third in the NCAA Championships for the 1500 meters. He also played goalkeeper for the soccer team and was ranked in the top five for career shutouts and goals against average. Phillips was inducted into Adelphi University Athletics Hall of Fame for soccer and track on April 19, 2007.

== Professional soccer ==
After college, Phillips went on to play professional soccer as goalkeeper. He played for the Dallas Tornado from 1980 to 1981, the Wichita Wings, San Jose Earthquakes, and St. Louis Steamers. In April 1983, Phillips joined the Dallas Americans of the American Soccer League. On November 23, 1984, Phillips signed as a free agent to the Dallas Sidekicks for a 10-day contract. He later signed a full time contract with them on December 3, 1984. By doing this, he became the only player to wear the uniform of every professional soccer team that had represented Dallas up to 1984.

For the Dallas Sidekicks, Phillips earned their first regular season win as goalkeeper on December 8, 1984, against the New York Cosmos. He was also the first MISL player of the week from the Dallas Sidekicks (December 17, 1984). While his #0 Dallas Sidekicks jersey has not been officially retired, no other goalkeeper in Sidekicks history wore that number.

Throughout his three seasons as goalkeeper with the Dallas Sidekicks, he played 26 games and clocked 1,495:28 regular season minutes and 75:40 playoff minutes in 2 games. The Dallas Sidekicks won the 1986-1987 MISL Championship.

While a player, Phillips also joined the front office staff in 1986 as Director of Community Relations and Soccer Camps. Since then, he has gone on to coach and manage numerous soccer camps. Some soccer camps to note are the Dallas Sidekicks day camps, the Dallas Sidekicks 4 v 4's which he started, and Tatu's All Star Soccer residential camp, which just finished its 16th year in 2007.

== Coaching ==
After retiring from goalkeeping in 1987, he was named Assistant Coach of the Dallas Sidekicks on July 6, 1987. He was then promoted to Head Coach on March 2, 1989, and remained in that position until January 21, 1991. Phillips was named MISL Coach of the Year for 1989–1990. He then returned as the Assistant Coach of the Sidekicks until he was promoted to a front office position in 1996. During his time as assistant coach, the Sidekicks went on to win their second title in 1993 when they were in the CISL.

Pillips currently resides in Plano, Texas. He was involved with the Dallas Sidekicks in the front office until they folded in 2004. He now works full time in a Senior Director of Corporate Sponsorships position for the Dallas Mavericks basketball team.

In his spare time, he has coached many youth select soccer teams including the Women's 87' Sting Soccer team. They had four Regional runs and six National runs.

== Personal ==
Phillips will be married to his wife, Kelly Phillips, for 25 years in September 2007. They have two daughters. Paige Phillips, who graduated from The University of Kansas (KU) where she was a member of the Division I rowing team for four years. She is currently a Highland Park High School Crew (Rowing) coach in Dallas. Carley Phillips who currently is a Junior at Southern Methodist University (SMU) where she plays for the Division I soccer team and was recently named captain. She is majoring in Psychology and Early Education.
