= Los Angeles Lazers =

- Full name: Los Angeles Lazers
- Founded: 1982
- Dissolved: 1989
- Ground: The Forum, Inglewood, California
- Capacity: 15,893
- Owner: Jerry Buss
- League: Major Indoor Soccer League

The Los Angeles Lazers were an indoor soccer team that played in the Major Indoor Soccer League (MISL) from 1982 to 1989.

== History ==
Jerry Buss, the owner of California Sports, the parent company of the Los Angeles Lakers, Kings and Strings of TeamTennis and The Forum, the home arena of all three teams, was always looking for innovative ways to add additional creative programming to the Forum. He called upon his oldest son Johnny Buss and long-time California Sports executive Ron Weinstein to bring indoor soccer to Los Angeles. In 1981, Buss was awarded an expansion franchise at the same August league meeting where the MISL granted a one-year leave of absence to the Philadelphia Fever. Buss and Weinstein named the team the Los Angeles Lazers, and the team began play in the fall of 1982. The team's name stemmed from the up-and-coming laser light show industry, which management believed would depict a perfect synergy of the lightning fast pace of indoor soccer. It became a pre-game ritual for every Lazers game to have a laser show displayed on the walls of the Forum, which even intrigued Neil Diamond enough to visit the Lazer offices in order to investigate and ultimately incorporate this new laser technology into his own onstage live performances. Following in the footsteps of the "Showtime" Los Angeles Lakers, the Lazers drew many celebrities to their games including Cher, James Caan, Ricky Schroder and Diamond. The "Laker Girls" performed double duty from 1982 to 1989, performing as the "Lazer Girls" at all home games. This opportunity played an integral part in the career of Paula Abdul, who was the lead dancer and choreographer of the team.

Johnny Buss was president of the Lazers from 1982 to 1985 when he went on to pursue other endeavors. His younger brother, Jim Buss, took over as president for the 1985–86 season. In 1986, Jerry Buss attended his first MISL Board of Governors meeting. He strongly suggested to the board that they begin to reduce player salaries and gradually move the league into the summer months. Dr. Buss continued to play for three more seasons, and, after recognizing the MISL was not moving in the proper direction in the summer of 1989, he shared with Lazers executive vice president Ron Weinstein that he was closing the doors on the Lazers. He told Weinstein that if he ever wanted to start a professional indoor soccer league that played in the summer months with a fiscally responsible budget, then he would mentor him while tying the new league into the NBA and NHL. Thus, the seed was planted in Weinstein for the founding of the Continental Indoor Soccer League (CISL).

== Arena ==
The Lazers played their home games in The Forum in Inglewood, California.

== Coaches ==
- (England) Peter Wall 1982–1987
- (United States) Keith Tozer 1987–1989

== Year-by-year ==
Year	Record	Regular season	Playoffs	Avg. attendance
1982–1983	8–40	7th Western Division	Did not qualify	3,963
1983–1984	24–24	3rd Western Division	First Round	4,405
1984–1985	24–24	3rd Western Division	Quarterfinals	5,062
1985–1986	13–35	6th Western Division	Did not qualify	4,770
1986–1987	16–36	6th Western Division	Did not qualify	4,647
1987–1988	31–25	2nd Western Division	1st Round	5,879
1988–1989	21–27	6th	Did not qualify	4,866

== Honors ==
Coach of the Year

- 1984–1985 Peter Wall

Rookie of the Year

- 1982–83 Kirk Shermer

== Television and radio coverage ==
In their inaugural season, the Lazers games were broadcast on Cable Radio Network. Beginning in the second season, Bill MacDonald asked Buss and Weinstein for permission to broadcast the Lazers home games on KBOB radio in Pasadena. MacDonald's family agreed to purchase the air time, and MacDonald's long running career was launched. During the 1983–84 season, the Lazers made the first entree into the television arena by broadcasting a few games on the Lakers and Kings KCAL 9 television network. Chick Hearn, the Lakers broadcaster, and Bob Miller, the Kings broadcaster, shared the play-by-play responsibilities. During the 1984–85 season, the Lazers began to broadcast their games on Prime Ticket, which was the regional sports network created by Dr. Jerry Buss for Southern California. This first Lazers broadcast was only the second event to have ever been aired on the Prime Ticket Network. Joel Meyers, a new and upcoming telecaster, joined MacDonald to become the dynamic team that announced every play from then on for the Lazers.
