= Wes McLeod =

Canadian soccer player

Personal information
- Full name: Wesley McLeod
- Date of birth: October 24, 1957 (age 69)
- Place of birth: Vancouver, British Columbia, Canada
- Height: 5 ft 9 in (1.75 m)
- Positions: Forward; midfielder

Youth career
- 1975–1976: Coquitlam Blue Mountain

Senior career*
Years	Team	Apps	(Gls)
1976–1977	Vancouver Columbus FC (Italia)		
1977–1984	Tampa Bay Rowdies	188	(34)
1979–1984	Tampa Bay Rowdies (indoor)		
1984–1985	New York Cosmos (indoor)	27	(11)
1985–1992	Dallas Sidekicks (indoor)	321	(74)

International career
1976–1985	Canada	18	(1)
- * Club domestic league appearances and goals

Wes McLeod (born October 24, 1957) is a retired Canadian soccer player who earned eighteen caps with the Canadian national soccer team.

== Club career ==
Born in Vancouver, British Columbia, Canada, McLeod spent his youth career with Coquitlam Blue Mountain. In 1976, he moved to Vancouver Columbus FC (Italia). In 1977 McLeod signed with Tampa Bay Rowdies of the North American Soccer League. Over eight seasons with the Rowdies, he was selected to the NASL's North American All-Star team in 1977, 1978, 1979, 1980, 1981 and 1982, a record six times. In August 1984, he signed with the New York Cosmos of the Major Indoor Soccer League. In February 1985, the Cosmos withdrew from the league and, McLeod signed with the Dallas Sidekicks on February 25, 1985. In seven seasons, he was a three-time All-Star and the 1989-90 Defender of the Year. He retired in May 1992. In September 2003 his number eight shirt was retired by the Sidekicks.

== National team ==
McLeod made his Olympic team debut at 17 in 1975 against Poland in Toronto. A year later he was a member of the Olympic team at the Olympic Games in Montreal and had a memorable game against the Soviet Union in the Olympic Stadium. He was a member of Canada's national team in World Cup qualifying in 1976 and in 1980 and 1981. McLeod won 18 full international caps, scoring one goal.

=== International goals ===
Scores and results list Canada's goal tally first.

#	Date	Venue	Opponent	Score	Result	Competition
1	21 November 1981	Estadio Tiburcio Carías Andino, Tegucigalpa, Honduras	Cuba	1–1	2–2	1982 FIFA World Cup qualification

== Post-retirement ==
In the fall of 1992, McLeod was hired to coach the Clearwater High School boys' soccer team.

In April 2005 McLeod was inducted into the Canadian Soccer Hall of Fame at the same time as his uncle Norm McLeod. McLeod's #8 jersey was retired by the Sidekicks on January 24, 2004.
