= Tacoma Stars (1983–1992) =

Indoor soccer team from Washington, US

Tacoma Stars
Operated	1983–1992
Arena	Tacoma Dome
Based in	Tacoma, Washington
Colors	Blue, yellow & orange
League	Major Indoor Soccer League
Coach

The Tacoma Stars were an American professional indoor soccer team that played in the Major Indoor Soccer League from 1983 to 1992. They played at the Tacoma Dome in Tacoma, Washington.

The team was established in 1983 from the defunct Denver Avalanche. The Stars hold the record for the largest crowd to witness an indoor soccer game—21,728 people—from game 7 of the 1987 MISL Championship, which they lost to the Dallas Sidekicks in overtime. Tacoma was the only team in MISL history to defeat the perennial champion San Diego Sockers in a MISL playoff series.

A new team named after the MISL Stars began play in the Professional Arena Soccer League in 2003. The team eventually dropped down to the minor league Premier Arena Soccer League and later Western Indoor Soccer League before moving to the Major Arena Soccer League in 2015.

== Year-by-year record ==
Year	GP	W	L	GF	GA	PCT	Finish	Playoffs	Avg. attendance
1983–84	48	22	26	226	232	.458	5th West	Out of playoffs	5,322
1984–85	48	17	31	207	263	.354	6th West	Out of playoffs	7,222
1985–86	48	23	25	208	232	.479	3rd West	Lost semifinal	7,612
1986–87	52	35	17	249	211	.673	1st West	Lost championship	10,384
1987–88	56	27	29	259	285	.482	4th West	Lost division semifinal	10,505
1988–89	48	23	25	208	207	.479	4th MISL	Lost wild card	6,781
1989–90	52	20	32	191	217	.385	4th West	Out of playoffs	6,146
1990–91	52	25	27	254	259	.481	3rd West	Lost division semifinal	5,482
1991–92	40	18	22	228	242	.450	6th MISL	Out of playoffs	4,821
