= Cleveland Force (1978–1988) =

American indoor soccer team

The original Cleveland Force was one of six charter franchises in the original Major Indoor Soccer League (MISL). The team played from 1978 to 1988 at the Richfield Coliseum, the home of the Cleveland Cavaliers, and regularly drew crowds in excess of 12,000 in the mid-1980s.

Akron businessman Eric J. Henderson, who had been involved in ownership of the Cleveland Cobras of the American Soccer League in 1977, was the Force's first owner. He sold controlling interest to Cleveland multi-millionaire Bert Wolstein in 1979. Under Wolstein and his son Scott's direction, the club became a rarity in America — a professional soccer team that turned a profit.

The team's nickname was a reference to the Force, a mystical power used by the Jedi Knights in the then recently released film Star Wars. The team theatrics originally included Darth Vader and Star Wars music until the team faced litigation and had to change the "mascot". Scott Wolstein worked out an agreement with George Lucas and a year later, the mascot and music returned.

Despite its popularity and success, Wolstein folded the team on July 22, 1988, after repeated frustrations in trying to get concessions from the MISL Players Association (MISLPA).

== History ==
The Force started off the '78–'79 season by splitting their first two games. That turned out to be the high point of the season. The team lost 13 of its last 14 games to finish in sixth place, one game behind the Pittsburgh Spirit. Only Brian Budd and Roy Sinclair managed to break double digits in goals, netting 24 and 10 respectively.

The MISL expanded to 10 teams and a 32-game schedule in '79–'80. The Force was placed in the Central Division with Houston, which finished the previous year with the best record, and expansion teams in Detroit, St. Louis and Wichita. Cleveland's roster was almost entirely new with only four players from the previous season returning. The result was pretty much the same as the Force tied for last place in the division with the St. Louis Steamers

Cleveland made it to the playoffs for the first time the following season with a 21–19 record, then fell back again in 1981–82. Wolstein then hired Timo Liekoski as coach. Liekoski brought in several players from the North American Soccer League, and the Force had its first truly successful season. Still, Wolstein was not happy with attendance until a flash crowd of 19,106 jammed the Richfield Coliseum for a playoff game against the Chicago Sting. The team was an overnight success. That success continued through the remainder of the team's existence, as it qualified for the playoffs each year and averaged at least 11,000 fans per game each year until the team folded in 1988.

Big crowds were commonplace for the next few years as the Force displayed a fan-pleasing high-powered offense. Despite success on the field and at the turnstiles, Wolstein grew increasingly displeased with other MISL owners failing to put as much time, effort and money into their franchises as he did. With other clubs folding and Cleveland's attendance starting to tumble, he gave up the quest in the summer of 1988. It was one month after the club reached the championship round for the first time, being swept in four games by the San Diego Sockers.

== Year-by-year ==
Year	League	Reg. season	Playoffs	Attendance average
1978/79	MISL	6th, 5–19	out of playoffs	3,116
1979/80	MISL	5th, Central, 12–20	out of playoffs	3,080
1980/81	MISL	2nd, Central, 21–19	1st Round	4,884
1981/82	MISL	6th, Eastern, 15–29	out of playoffs	5,001
1982/83	MISL	2nd, Eastern, 29–19	Semifinals	6,609
1983/84	MISL	3rd, Eastern, 31–17	Semifinals	13,692
1984/85	MISL	3rd, Eastern, 27–21	Semifinals	12,929
1985/86	MISL	1st, Eastern, 27–21	Semifinals	12,793
1986/87	MISL	1st, Eastern, 34–18	Semifinals	14,111
1987/88	MISL	2nd, Eastern, 30–26	Lost Finals	11,279

== Honors ==
Pass Master

- 1986–1987 Kai Haaskivi

Defender of the Year

- 1982–1983 Bernie James

Rookie of the Year

- 1984–1985 Ali Kazemaini
- 1986–1987 John Stollmeyer

First Team All-MISL

- 1980–81 Ian Anderson, D
- 1983–84 Kai Haaskivi, M
- 1986–87 Kai Haaskivi, M

Second Team All-MISL

- 1978–79 Alan Hamlyn, D
- 1982–83 Kai Haaskivi, F
- 1983–84 Craig Allen, F
- 1985–86 Craig Allen, F
- 1986–87 Bernie James, D

Honorable Mention All-MISL

- 1981–82 Keith Furphy, F
- 1982–83 Bernie James, D
- 1984–85 Benny Dargle, D
- 1987–88 Kai Haaskivi, M

== Head coaches ==
- (England) Gordon Fearnley (1978–79) 2–4 (.333)
- (England) Peter Terry (1979) 3–15 (.167)
- (Scotland) Eddie McCreadie (1979–82) 48–68 (.414); Playoffs: 1–2 (.333)
- (Finland) Timo Liekoski (1982–88) 178–122 (.593); Playoffs: 27–29 (.482)
