= Dallas Sidekicks (1984–2004) =

- Full name: Dallas Sidekicks
- Nickname: Kicks
- Founded: January 9, 1984
- Dissolved: September 13, 2004; 21 years ago
- Ground: Reunion Arena
- Capacity: 16,626
- League: MISL I CISL; WISL; MISL II
Home colors

The Dallas Sidekicks were one of the longest operating professional soccer teams, either indoor or outdoor, in the United States, based in Dallas, Texas, and operating from 1984 until suspending operations following the 2003–04 season. The team was founded as a member of the original Major Indoor Soccer League. Over the years, the team played in four other leagues (CISL, WISL, PSA, and the second incarnation of the MISL). The team's most famous player was Tatu, who was known for throwing his shirt into the stands after every goal. The team hosted the 1989 MISL All-Star Game. The team was one of the most successful franchises in indoor soccer history, making the playoffs in 16 of their 19 seasons of play. In the playoffs, the team made it to the championship game/series eight times, winning four titles.

An expansion team named after this team began play in the Professional Arena Soccer League on November 3, 2012. Home games for the new Dallas Sidekicks are played at the Allen Event Center in Allen, Texas.

== Key moments ==
The first goal (and first powerplay goal) in team history was scored by forward Herve Guilliod on November 2, 1984, in a game against the Las Vegas Americans. Goals #100, #2,000, and #3,000 were all scored by all-time team scoring leader Tatu.

Around noon on Feb. 13, 1989 The Dallas Sidekicks filed for Chapter 11 bankruptcy protection, one hour before the Mavericks were scheduled to file suit seeking to force the Sidekicks to repay a $519,000 debt. Team president David Shuttee said the debt was from 1986, when a group of Dallas businessmen purchased the Sidekicks from Mavericks owner Donald Carter.

== Rivalry ==
During the MISL I days, the Sidekicks main rivals were the San Diego Sockers, Tacoma Stars, and Minnesota Strikers. During the 1990s, a rivalry developed between the Sidekicks and Monterrey La Raza.

== Head coaches ==
In March 2013, Gordon Jago was named to the 2013 class of the Indoor Soccer Hall of Fame.

Year	Coach	Record	Notable wins
1984–1989 & 1991–1997	Gordon Jago	231–203	2 Championship victories (1986–87 in the MISL and 1993 in the CISL)
1989–1991	Billy Phillips	53–49	1 Western Division Title (1989–90 in the MISL )
1998–2004	Tatu	84–68	2 Championship victories (1998 and 2001 in the WISL)

=== Retired uniform numbers ===
- #5 Mike Powers 1987–2001
- #8 Wes McLeod 1986–1992
- #9 Tatu 1984–2003
- #10 Kevin Smith 1984–92, 1995–98
- #11 David Doyle 1991–2004
- #22 Doc Lawson 1985–91
- #23 Nick Stavrou 1991-04
- #31 Krys Sobieski 1985–91
- Gordon Jago Head Coach/General Manager 1984–98

=== Former players ===
- #00 Shawn Ray 1994–95, 1996–98
- #4 Rusty Troy 1995–2004
- #5 Mike Powers 1987–2001
- #8 Wes McLeod 1986–1992
- #9 Tatu 1984–2003
- #10 Kevin Smith 1984–92, 1995–98
- #11 David Doyle 1991–2004
- #18 Nick Efthimiou 1993–1999
- #22 Doc Lawson 1985–91
- #31 Krys Sobieski 1985–91
- #17 Scott Lawler 1993

== Arenas ==
- Reunion Arena, 1984–2004
- American Airlines Center, 2001 (one game)
- Inwood Soccer Center, 1986–2004 (practice facility & exhibition games)

== Year-by-year ==
League champions	Runners-Up	Division/League Champions*	Playoff berth

Year	League	Reg. season	GF	GA	Pct	Finish	Playoffs	Owner(s)	Attendance Average	Slogan
1984–85	MISL	12–36	194	286	.250	7th West	did not qualify	Donald Carter	4,969	Fast, Fun and Furious!
1985–86	MISL	25–23	220	231	.521	3rd East	Lost Eastern Division Semifinals vs. Minnesota Strikers, 1–3	Donald Carter	6,654	It'll knock yer socks off!
1986–87**	MISL	28–24	209	197	.538	3rd East	Won Eastern Division Semifinals vs. Baltimore Blast, 3–2; Won Eastern Division Finals vs. Cleveland Force, 4–1; Won MISL Finals vs. Tacoma Stars, 4–3	Stan Finney, Jan Rogers, Joe Shea	8,637	The wild side of soccer!
1987–88	MISL	28–28	200	204	.500	3rd East	Lost Eastern Division Semifinals vs. Cleveland Force, 1–3	Stan Finney, Jan Rogers, Joe Shea	9,878	Never Say Die
1988–89	MISL	24–24	185	206	.500	3rd MISL	Lost Semifinals vs. San Diego Sockers, 3–4	Stan Finney, Jan Rogers, Joe Shea	8,567	Get your kicks
1989–90	MISL	31–21	217	190	.596	1st West	Lost Western Division Finals vs. San Diego Sockers, 2–4	David Paschal	9,004	N/A
1990–91	MSL	20–32	257	294	.385	4th West	did not qualify	Phill Cobb	6,920	N/A
1991–92	MSL	22–18	231	229	.550	2nd MISL	Won Semifinals vs. Cleveland Crunch, 4–2; Lost MISL Finals vs. San Diego Sockers, 2–4	Donald Carter	7,003	N/A
1993	CISL	23–5	230	150	.821	1st CISL	Won Semifinal Game vs. Monterrey La Raza, 11–6; Won CISL Finals vs. San Diego Sockers, 2–1	Donald Carter	5,800	N/A
1994	CISL	24–4	255	160	.857	1st East	Won Quarterfinals vs. Pittsburgh Stingers, 2–0; Won Semifinals vs. Washington Warthogs, 2–0; Lost CISL Finals vs. Las Vegas Dustdevils, 1–2	Donald Carter	7,310	N/A
1995	CISL	18–10	215	165	.643	2nd East	Won Quarterfinals vs. Mexico Toros, 2–0; Lost Semifinals vs. Monterrey La Raza, 0–2	Donald Carter	9,380	N/A
1996	CISL	16–12	186	167	.571	3rd East	Won Quarterfinals vs. Anaheim Splash, 2–0; Lost Semifinals vs. Monterrey La Raza, 0–2	Sonny Willams, Donald Carter	9,202	Hot Soccer Cool Seat
1997	CISL	13–15	165	160	.464	4th East	Lost Quarterfinals vs. Monterrey La Raza, 1–2	Sonny Willams, Donald Carter	9,212	Major League Fun
1998	PSA	8–2	N/A	N/A	.800	1st WISL	Won PSA Championship Game vs. Sacramento Knights, 6–2	Sonny Willams, Donald Carter	9,167	NSN Never Say Never™
1999	WISL	15–7	127	88	.773	2nd WISL	Won Semifinal Game vs. Monterrey La Raza, 4–3; Lost WISL Championship Game vs. Sacramento Knights, 6–7	Sonny Willams, Donald Carter	8,860	N/A
2000	WISL	17–7	153	107	.708	2nd WISL	Won Semifinal Game vs. Utah Freezz, 7–4; Lost WISL Championship Game vs. Monterrey La Raza, 5–6	Sonny Willams, Donald Carter	7,482	N/A
2001	WISL	14–10	109	108	.583	2nd WISL	Won Semifinals vs Sacramento Knights, 2–0; Won WISL Finals vs. San Diego Sockers, 2–1	Sonny Willams, Donald Carter	8,640	Not Your Ordinary Soccer
2002–03	MISL	9–27	342	427	.250	4th West	did not qualify	Sonny Willams	7,851	Fast and Furious
2003–04	MISL	21–15	213	167	.583	1st West	Won Quarterfinal Game vs. Cleveland Force, 7–4; Lost Semifinal Game vs. Baltimore Blast, 1–6	Sonny Willams	5,756	N/A

- *There were 7 seasons where the league the Sidekicks were competing in did not feature divisions, so there was a regular season league champion before the playoffs began.
- **This 1986–87 Sidekicks team was inducted into the Pizza Hut Park Texans Credit Union Walk of Fame. Known forever in Dallas as the "Never Say Die" season, the Dallas Sidekicks defeated a heavily favored Tacoma Stars squad to win the 1987 MISL Championship. Down three games to two in a best-of-seven series, the Sidekicks won the final two games 5–4 and 4–3 respectively, both in overtime and both in front of sold-out arenas in Tacoma and Dallas.

== Honors ==
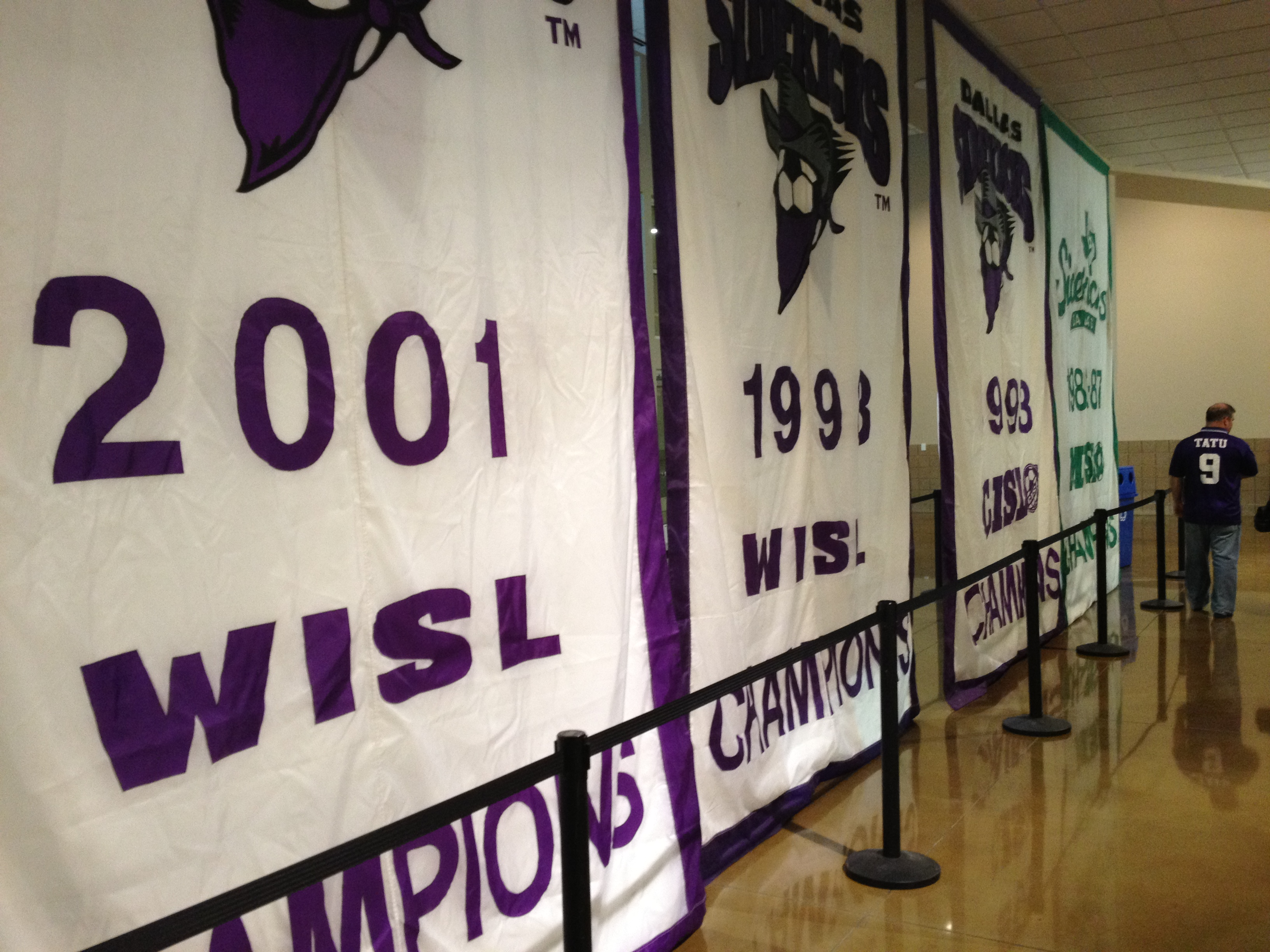
Championship banners on display at the Allen Event Center on November 30, 2012.

Championships (4)

- 1986–87 MISL
- 1993 CISL
- 1998 PSA
- 2001 WISL

Division Titles (5)

- 1989–90 MISL Western Division
- 1993 CISL Regular Season
- 1994 CISL Eastern Division
- 1998 PSA Regular Season
- 2003–04 MISL II Western Division
