= 1983–84 NASL indoor season =

Indoor soccer league season

North American Soccer League 1983–84 indoor season
- Season: 1983–84
- Teams: 19
- Champions: San Diego Sockers (2nd Title)
- Premiers: San Diego Sockers
- Matches: 112
- Goals: 1,377 (12.29 per match)
- Top goalscorer: (Socialist Federal Republic of Yugoslavia) Steve Zungul (63 goals)

The 1983–84 North American Soccer League indoor season was the fourth and last in league history. The San Diego Sockers defeated the New York Cosmos for their third straight indoor title, having won the NASL Indoor title in 1981–82 and the MISL title in 1982–83.

== Season recap ==
The NASL was struggling for life at this point, and finding teams to play the indoor season would be difficult. While San Diego, the Chicago Sting and the Golden Bay Earthquakes were committed to the league, filling out the ranks would be problematic. With the league making plain their desire to have both an indoor and outdoor element going forward, the Fort Lauderdale Strikers decided to move to Minnesota for the 1984 NASL season due to a lack of suitable arenas in the local area.

The Tampa Bay Rowdies were unsure whether or not they would be able to play, as the previous owners had committed to play in the indoor season and then sold the team. This left the new owners in the lurch. The lack of a suitable arena was also an issue, eventually forcing Rowdies' home games to be split among three sites. The Tulsa Roughnecks were only in the league thanks to a fundraiser that put $65,000 in the team's coffers, even though the team had won the outdoor Soccer Bowl just weeks earlier.

Despite the uncertainty, this would be the largest NASL indoor season ever as a 32-game regular season, a best-of-three semifinal round and a best-of-five championship series were on the schedule. Also, the first (and only) All-Star Game in NASL history took place on February 8 at Chicago Stadium. The hometown Chicago Sting took on an All-Star team of the six other squads. Despite four goals from Chicago's Karl-Heinz Granitza, the All-Stars won 9–8.

Not surprisingly, the teams with steady management performed best through the season. The Sockers averaged over 11,000 for their home games and finished first, overcoming a slow 8-8 start. The hot streak continued in the playoffs as the team won all five of their postseason games en route to the NASL title.

The NASL confirmed plans for 40-game indoor seasons in 1985 and 1986 near the end of the season, but folded for good in March 1985. By then, San Diego, Minnesota, New York and Chicago had joined the MISL. While the Sockers, Strikers and Sting experienced success in the MISL, the Cosmos would start the season but drop out on February 22, 1985.

== Teams ==
| Team | City/Area | Arena |
|---|---|---|
| Chicago Sting | Chicago | Chicago Stadium |
| Golden Bay Earthquakes | Oakland, California; Daly City, California | Oakland–Alameda County Coliseum Arena; Cow Palace |
| New York Cosmos | East Rutherford, New Jersey; New York, New York | Brendan Byrne Arena (8 games); Madison Square Garden (8 games) |
| San Diego Sockers | San Diego | San Diego Sports Arena |
| Tampa Bay Rowdies | Tampa, Florida; St. Petersburg, Florida; Lakeland, Florida | Tampa Fairgrounds Arena (8 games); Bayfront Center (5 games); Lakeland Civic Center (3 games) |
| Tulsa Roughnecks | Tulsa, Oklahoma | Tulsa Fairgrounds Pavilion |
| Vancouver Whitecaps | Vancouver | Pacific Coliseum |

== Map of clubs ==
1983-84 NASL indoor season clubs

== Regular season ==
The 1983–84 regular season schedule ran from November 11, 1983, to March 25, 1984. The 32 games per team was almost double the length of previous NASL Indoor seasons.

W = Wins, L = Losses, GB = Games Behind 1st Place, Pct. = Winning Percentage, GF = Goals For, GA = Goals Against

| Final Standings | W | L | Pct. | GB | GF | GA | Home | Road |
|---|---|---|---|---|---|---|---|---|
| San Diego Sockers | 21 | 11 | .656 | – | 196 | 148 | 14–2 | 7–9 |
| New York Cosmos | 20 | 12 | .625 | 1 | 219 | 198 | 13–3 | 7–9 |
| Chicago Sting | 20 | 12 | .625 | 1 | 183 | 148 | 12–4 | 8–8 |
| Golden Bay Earthquakes | 19 | 13 | .594 | 2 | 206 | 190 | 12–4 | 7–9 |
| Vancouver Whitecaps | 12 | 20 | .375 | 9 | 187 | 209 | 6–10 | 6–10 |
| Tulsa Roughnecks | 11 | 21 | .344 | 10 | 166 | 216 | 7–9 | 4–12 |
| Tampa Bay Rowdies | 9 | 23 | .281 | 12 | 177 | 225 | 5–11 | 4–12 |

== Regular season statistics ==
=== Scoring leaders ===
GP = Games Played, G = Goals, A = Assists, Pts = Points

| Player | Team | GP | G | A | Pts |
|---|---|---|---|---|---|
| (Socialist Federal Republic of Yugoslavia) Steve Zungul | Golden Bay Earthquakes | 32 | 63 | 56 | 119 |
| (Germany) Karl-Heinz Granitza | Chicago Sting | 32 | 59 | 33 | 92 |
| (United States) Juli Veee | San Diego Sockers | 28 | 45 | 29 | 74 |
| (Canada) Carl Valentine | Vancouver Whitecaps | 32 | 44 | 26 | 70 |
| (United States) Chico Borja | New York Cosmos | 31 | 29 | 37 | 66 |
| (England) Godfrey Ingram | Golden Bay Earthquakes | 32 | 38 | 25 | 63 |
| (Brazil) Tatu | Tampa Bay Rowdies | 30 | 49 | 11 | 60 |
| (Poland) Stan Terlecki | New York Cosmos | 23 | 34 | 23 | 57 |
| (England) Peter Ward | Vancouver Whitecaps | 28 | 42 | 12 | 54 |
| (Poland) Kaz Deyna | San Diego Sockers | 27 | 28 | 24 | 52 |

=== Leading goalkeepers ===
Note: GP = Games played; Min – Minutes played; GA = Goals against; GAA = Goals against average; W = Wins; L = Losses

| Player | Team | GP | Min | GA | GAA | W | L |
|---|---|---|---|---|---|---|---|
| (United States) Jim Gorsek | San Diego Sockers | 18 | 1074 | 73 | 4.08 | 14 | 4 |
| (United States) Victor Nogueira | Chicago Sting | 32 | 1873 | 136 | 4.36 | 20 | 10 |
| (United States) Bob Rigby | Golden Bay Earthquakes | 31 | 1890 | 184 | 5.84 | 18 | 13 |
| (United States) David Brcic | New York Cosmos | 26 | 1570 | 155 | 5.92 | 18 | 8 |
| (Germany) Jürgen Stars | Tampa Bay Rowdies | 26 | 1506 | 171 | 6.81 | 8 | 18 |
| (United States) Winston DuBose | Tulsa Roughnecks | 22 | 1416 | 161 | 6.82 | 7 | 15 |

== 1984 NASL All-Star Game ==
On February 8, the city of Chicago hosted what turned out to be the only All-Star game in NASL history. The Chicago Sting battled a team of All-Stars from the other six teams for the benefit of Chicago Tribune Charities. The starters were voted on by the players, while San Diego coach Ron Newman selected the reserves. The All-Stars outdueled the Sting 9–8 before 14,328 fans at Chicago Stadium, despite an MVP performance by Chicago's Karl-Heinz Granitza. Granitza scored four goals on the night.

| All-Star Game starters | Position | All-Star Game reserves |
|---|---|---|
| * (United States) Alan Mayer, San Diego | G | (United States) David Brcic, New York • (Canada) Tino Lettieri Vancouver |
| (England) Barry Wallace, Tulsa | D | (United States) Angelo DiBernardo, New York • (Haiti) Frantz Mathieu, Tampa Bay |
| (United States) Fernando Clavijo, Golden Bay | D | (South Africa) Mike Connell, Tampa Bay • (Germany) Gert Wieczorkowski, San Diego |
| (Socialist Federal Republic of Yugoslavia) Steve Zungul, Golden Bay | F | (Canada) Carl Valentine, Vancouver • (Poland) ^Stan Terlecki, New York |
| (Poland) Kaz Deyna, San Diego | F | (Germany) Jean Willrich, San Diego • (Brazil) Zequinha, Tulsa |
| (United States) Juli Veee, San Diego | F | (Canada) Peter Ward, Vancouver |

*Alan Mayer of San Diego was originally selected as a starter but due to a broken finger was unable to play. Tino Lettieri of Vancouver was named as his replacement.^Stan Terlecki of New York was originally selected as a reserve but due to injury was unable to play. Zequinha of Tulsa was named as his replacement.

=== Match report ===
| February 8, 1984 All-Star Game | Chicago Sting | 8–9 | NASL All-Stars | Chicago, Illinois |
| 8:00 PM (CST) | Margetic (00:48); Granitza (3:23); Weiner (7:00); Granitza (23:27); Granitza (27:32); Granitza (29:19); Margetic (45:32); Margetic (56:33) | Report | Zungul (00:48); Zequinha (3:23); Ward (7:00); Ward (23:27); Valentine (27:32); Zungul (29:19); Veee (37:50); Deyna (54:08); Wieczorkowski (57:16) | Stadium: Chicago Stadium; Attendance: 14,328; Referee: Feliks Fuksman & Julio Salas |

== NASL All-Stars ==
During the finals the NASL announced the traditional All-NASL team of All-Stars, as voted on by the players at the end of the regular season.

| First Team | Position | Second Team |
|---|---|---|
| (United States) Victor Nogueira, Chicago | G | (United States) David Brcic, New York |
| (United States) Fernando Clavijo, Golden Bay | D | (United States) Dan Canter, New York |
| (Germany) Gert Wieczorkowski, San Diego | D | (Northern Ireland) Martin Donnelly, San Diego |
| (Poland) Kaz Deyna, San Diego | M | (United States) Juli Veee, San Diego |
| (Socialist Federal Republic of Yugoslavia) Steve Zungul, Golden Bay | F | (Canada) Carl Valentine, Vancouver |
| (Germany) Karl-Heinz Granitza, Chicago | F | (Argentina) Pato Margetic, Chicago • (Poland) Stan Terlecki, New York |

== Playoffs ==
=== Bracket ===
Semifinals; Best-of-3
1 | San Diego Sockers | 5 | 7 | –
4 | Golden Bay Earthquakes | 2 | 2 | –
2 | New York Cosmos | 4 | 3 | 8
3 | Chicago Sting | 3 | 7 | 7

Championship series Best-of-5
1 | San Diego Sockers | 5 | 10 | 7
2 | New York Cosmos | 2 | 4 | 3

=== Semifinals ===
Best of three series

| Higher seed | | Lower seed | Game 1 | Game 2 | Game 3 | Attendance |
| San Diego Sockers | – | Golden Bay Earthquakes | 5–2 | 7–2 | x | March 29 • San Diego Sports Arena • 10,870; April 1 • Oakland Coliseum Arena • 4,413 |
| New York Cosmos | – | Chicago Sting | 4–3 | 3–7 | 8–7 | March 28 • Brendan Byrne Arena • 2,842; March 30 • Chicago Stadium • 15,462; April 1 • Brendan Byrne Arena • 5,420 |

=== Championship Series ===
Best of five series

| Higher seed | | Lower seed | Game 1 | Game 2 | Game 3 | Game 4 | Game 5 | Attendance |
| San Diego Sockers | – | New York Cosmos | 5–2 | 10–4 | 7–3 | x | x | April 5 • San Diego Sports Arena • 12,006; April 8 • San Diego Sports Arena • 12,696; April 11 • Brendan Byrne Arena • 4,717 |

==== Championship match reports ====
| April 5, 1984 Game 1 | San Diego Sockers | 5–2 | New York Cosmos | San Diego, California |
| 8:00 P.M. (PST) | Willrich (12:17); Donnelly (17:12); Willrich (25:17); Deyna 26' (Veee); Deyna (44:17) | Report A Report B | Borja (4:06); Parkinson 56' | Stadium: San Diego Sports Arena; Attendance: 12,006 |

| April 8, 1984 Game 2 | San Diego Sockers | 10–4 | New York Cosmos | San Diego, California |
| 6:30 P.M. (PST) | Deyna (6:52); Pérez (14:01); Coker (19:02); O'Kane (20:29); Quinn (21:36); Willrich (3rd Qtr); Coker (3rd Qtr); Pérez (4th Qtr); Pérez (4th Qtr); Skouras (4th Qtr) | Report A Report B | Moyers (11:46); Moyers (4th Qtr); De Matthaeis (4th Qtr); De Matthaeis (4th Qtr) | Stadium: San Diego Sports Arena; Attendance: 12,696 |

| April 11, 1984 Game 3 | New York Cosmos | 3–7 | San Diego Sockers | East Rutherford, New Jersey |
| 8:00 P.M. (EST) | DiBernardo (3:15); Parkinson (6:47); Borja (29:29) | Report A Report B | Namdar (17:37); Willrich (20:16); Crow (21:25); Crow (33:23); Deyna (43:04); Veee (44:32); Pérez (52:37) | Stadium: Brendan Byrne Arena; Attendance: 4,717; Referee: Gordon Arrowsmith (Canada) and Peter Johnson |

1983–84 NASL Indoor Champions: San Diego Sockers

== Post-season awards ==
- Most Valuable Player: (Socialist Federal Republic of Yugoslavia) Steve Zungul, Golden Bay
- Coach of the Year: (Italy) Eddie Firmani, New York
- Finals MVP: (Germany) Jean Willrich, San Diego

== Team attendance totals ==
| Club | Games | Total | Average |
|---|---|---|---|
| Chicago Sting | 16 | 189,228 | 11,827 |
| San Diego Sockers | 16 | 182,633 | 11,415 |
| New York Cosmos | 16 | 78,391 | 4,899 |
| Golden Bay Earthquakes | 16 | 72,190 | 4,512 |
| Tulsa Roughnecks | 16 | 59,304 | 3,707 |
| Vancouver Whitecaps | 16 | 46,336 | 2,896 |
| Tampa Bay Rowdies | 16 | 43,065 | 2,692 |
| OVERALL | 112 | 671,147 | 5,992 |
