= Namdar =

Namdar (Persian: نامدار) may refer to:

== People ==
- Namdar (surname)
- Namdar, Kermanshah
- Namdar, Lorestan
- Namdar-e Bala

== Companies ==
- Namdar Realty Group, a shopping mall investment company in the United States
