= Udaybhansinhji Natwarsinhji Jethwa =

Last Maharajkumar of Porbandar (1910–1977)

Udaybhansinhji Natwarsinhji

Titular Maharaja of Porbandar
- Born: 5 October 1910
- Died: 20 July 1977 (aged 66)
- Father: Natwarsinhji Bhavsinhji (adoptive)

Patvi Namdar Maharajkumar Shri Udaybhansinhji Natwarsinhji Jethwa Sahib (5 October 1910 in Shrinagar, Gujarat – 1977 in Rajkot), was the last Maharajkumar or Yuvraj of Jethwa dynasty of Princely State of Porbandar. He was associated with cooperative movement in post-independent India and was recipient of Padma Shri. The original Padma Shri Award of Maharajkumar Udaybhansinhji is Preserved by K.S. Satyarajsinhji Digvijaysinhji Jethwa of Shrinagar

== Contributions ==
In post-independent India, he played a pioneering role in the cooperative movement, agriculture, trade and industry. He was the Founder Chairman of IFFCO, President of the NCUI, and former President of the Land Development Bank. Through these roles, he made significant contributions to the cooperative movement and the economic development of Gujarat.

== Awards ==
For his outstanding contribution, the Government of India honoured him with the Padma Shri in 1971 in the field of Trade & Industry. The original Padma Shri is preserved by K. S. Satyarajsinhji Digvijaysinhji Jethwa, a great-grandson of Maharajkumar Udaybhansinhji’s brother, Darbar Sahib Jaswantsinhji Keshrisinhji Jethwa of Shrinagar.

== Legacy ==
Copies of his commemorative frame are preserved in Porbandar at Huzoor Palace, Darjya Mahel (RGT College), Chhaya Darbar Gadh, Jethwa Hostel and Bileshwar Mahadev Mandir.

In honour of Maharajkumar Udaybhansinhji:

- The IFFCO Township at Kalol, Gandhidham, Kutch is named Udaynagar.
- A statue of Maharajkumar Udaybhansinhji is installed in Udaynagar.
- Another statue of him is placed at the Head Office of the Kheti Bank in Ahmedabad.
- The Udaybhansinhji Regional Institute of Cooperative Management (URICM) is also named after him.

He is remembered for his leadership in strengthening cooperative institutions and for being a bridge between the royal legacy of Porbandar and modern India.

== Birth ==
He was born at Shrinagar, a town within the erstwhile Porbandar State of Gujarat on 5 October 1910 to Rana Shri Shivsinhji Motiji Sahib Jethwa, a cousin of Maharaja Rana Sahib Natwarsinhji Bhavsinhji Jethwa, the ruling scion of Princely State of Porbanadar.

== Education ==
After having done his primary education in Shrinagar & Porbandar he studied at Girassia College at Wadhwan. Afterwards, he earned B.A. degree from Bombay University and lastly studied Government Agriculture College at Poona and in 1932 passed out with Bachelor of Agriculture (B.Ag.) Degree.

== Adoption and marriage ==
As, Rana Sahib Natwarsinhji Bhavsinhji had no male issue, he adopted Udaysinhji, as a son and heir-apparent to the throne of Porbandar on 12 June 1941. In the same year, on 3 July 1941; Udaysinhji was married to Maharajkumari Shri Prem Kunverba Sahiba, daughter of H.H. Thakore Sahib Shri Digvijaysinhji Daulatsinhji Sahib of Limbdi. The couple did not have any issues from marriage.

== Career ==
He started his career as Preventive Officer at Bombay Port Trust and Customs Department. Later he was acclaimed as a leader of cooperative movement in India He was the founder and first Chairman of Indian Farmers Fertilizers Cooperative Organization (IFFCO), which has emerged as the world's largest fertilizers company. He served as Chairman of Indian Farmers Fertiliser Cooperative Limited (IFFCO) from years 1968–1973.

== Memorials ==
The National Council of Cooperative Training (NCCT) started Udaybhansinhji Regional Institute of Co-operative Management (URICM), named after Udaybhansinhji Natwarsinhji Jethwa in 1956 at Bhavnagar, now shifted to Gandhinagar, Gujarat.

== Death ==
He died in 1977, in Rajkot, without issue. When he died, the Rana Sahib Natwarsinhji Bhavsinhji, the last Maharaja of Porbandar, was still alive; he died in 1979 but he did not decide upon the next heir to the throne before his death. This has left the headship of Jethwa dynasty of Porbandar uncertain, even after more than three decades.
