= Natwarsinhji Bhavsinhji =

Last Maharaja of Porbandar from 1908–1948

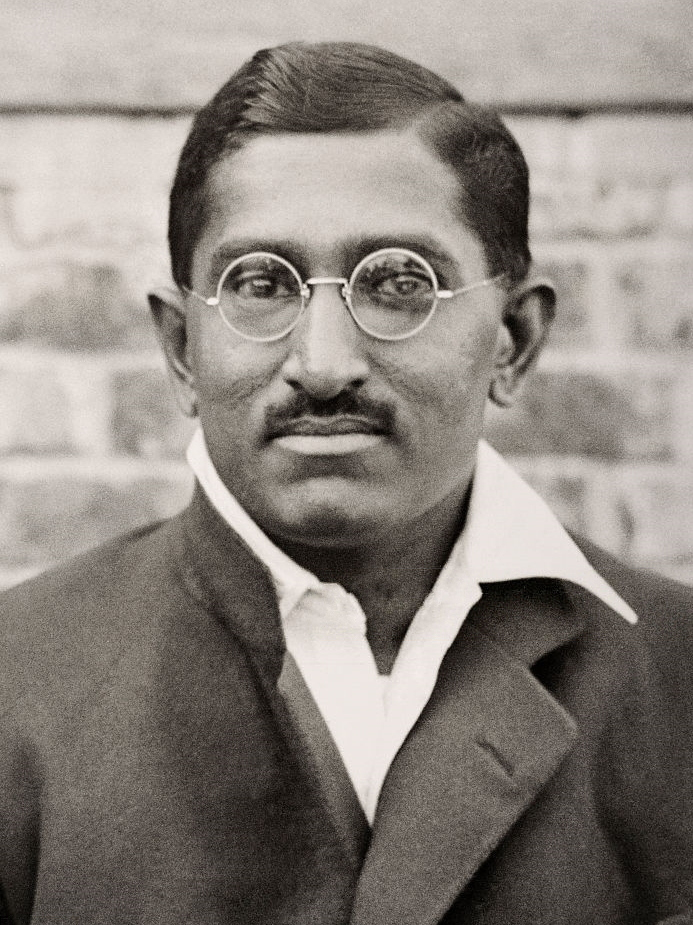
- Natwarsinhji Bhavsinhji in 1932

Maharaja Rana of Porbandar
- Reign: 10 December 1908 – 15 February 1948
- Predecessor: Bhavsinhji Madhavsinhji
- Successor: Monarchy Abolished
- Born: 30 June 1901; Porbandar, Porbandar State, British India
- Died: 4 October 1979 (aged 78); Porbandar, Gujarat, India
- Issue: Udaybhansinhji Natwarsinhji Jethwa (adoptive)
- Cricket career

Cricket information
- Batting: Right-handed

Career statistics
Competition	First-class
Matches	6
Runs scored	42
Batting average	6.00
100s/50s	0/0
Top score	22
Catches/stumpings	6/0
- Source: ESPNcricinfo, 26 March 2019

Lieutenant-Colonel Maharaja Rana Shri Sir Natwarsinhji Bhavsinhji Sahib Bahadur, KCSI (30 June 1901 – 4 October 1979) was the last Maharaja of Porbandar belonging to Jethwa dynasty, who ascended the throne of princely state of Porbandar on 10 December 1908 and ruled until his state was merged into India on 15 February 1948.

== Biography ==
He was the only son of Maharaja Rana Shri Bhavsinhji Madhavsinhji Sahib Bahadur, Rana Sahib of Porbandar, by his third wife, Maharani Bama Sahib Ramba Kunverba Sahiba of Bhavnagar State.

He was educated at the Rajkumar College at Rajkot and stood first in the diploma examination for all the Princes' colleges in India. He succeeded his father on his death on 10 December 1908 and ascended the throne on 26 January 1920 after he came of age.

He married twice, but had no children. He first married Rupaliba Sahiba (1898–1943) of Limbdi State in 1920 and, after her death, Anant Kunverba alias Annette de Silva (1911–1989) in 1954.

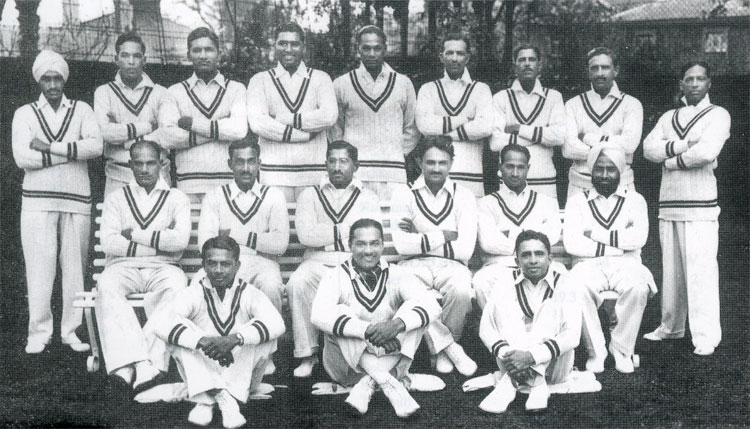
The 1932 Indian Test Cricket team that toured England. Maharaja of Porbandar, Maharaja Rana Shri Sir Natwarsinhji Bhavsinhji (Captain), seated 3rd from right with K. S. Limbdi (Vice-captain) sitting on his right and C. K. Nayudu sitting on his left.

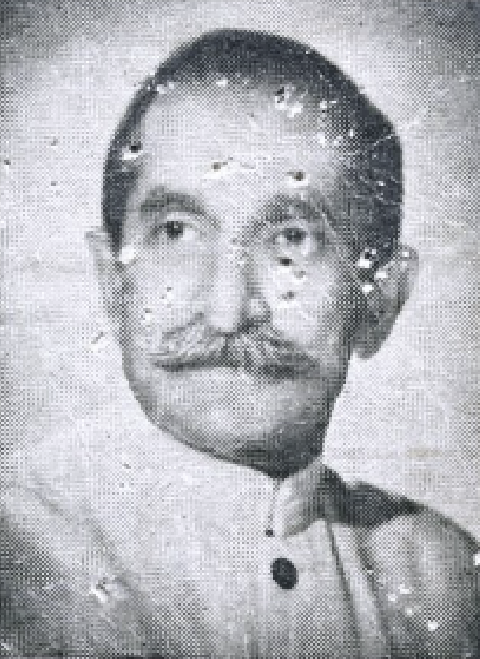
Rana Natwarsinhji in his later years.

He captained India in his first Indian cricket team in England in 1932. He played in only four of the 26 first-class matches. In the era when only Royals used to hold position of Captains, in a rare gesture of sportsmanship, he stood down from the captaincy in favour of the more talented C.K. Nayudu for the Test against England. K. S. Ghanshyamsinhji, the elder brother of Rupaliba Sahiba, served as his vice captain.

Natwarsinhji was an avid painter, author and musician; his literary works include "From the Flow of Life" (1967), "India's Problems: Reflections of an Ex-Ruler" (1970) and "International Solidarity" (1975). He was the joint composer with AW Hansen, of Great Britain of the "Oriental Moon Waltz" in 1930.

He gave land to Nanji Kalidas Mehta, to start Maharana Mills manufacturing textiles. After independence of India, he merged his state into the United State of Kathiawar on 15 February 1948. He also took active interest along with Nanji Kalidas Mehta to see that Kirti Mandir is being built in Porbandar, as a memorial to Mahatma Gandhi.

Maharaja Sir Natwarsinhji Jethwa of Porbandar died in 1979 after a 71-year reign, aged 78. Although he had adopted a son, Rajkumar Udaibhansinhji Jethwa, in 1941, he died in 1977 with no issue; therefore, the headship of the dynasty is still uncertain after decades.

== Titles ==
- 1901–1908: Patvi Namdar Maharajkumar Shri Natwarsinhji Bhavsinhji Sahib
- 1908–1918: His Highness Maharaja Rana Shri Natwarsinhji Bhavsinhji Sahib Bahadur, Rana Sahib of Porbandar
- 1918–1929: His Highness Maharaja Rana Shri Natwarsinhji Bhavsinhji Sahib Bahadur, Maharaja Rana Sahib of Porbandar
- 1929–1941: His Highness Maharaja Rana Shri Sir Natwarsinhji Bhavsinhji Sahib Bahadur, Maharaja Rana Sahib of Porbandar, KCSI
- 1941–1945: Captain His Highness Maharaja Rana Shri Sir Natwarsinhji Bhavsinhji Sahib Bahadur, Maharaja Rana Sahib of Porbandar, KCSI
- 1945–1946: Major His Highness Maharaja Rana Shri Sir Natwarsinhji Bhavsinhji Sahib Bahadur, Maharaja Rana Sahib of Porbandar, KCSI
- 1946–1971: Lieutenant-Colonel His Highness Maharaja Rana Shri Sir Natwarsinhji Bhavsinhji Sahib Bahadur, Maharaja Rana Sahib of Porbandar, KCSI

== Honours ==
- Delhi Durbar Gold Medal – 1911
- Knight Commander of the Order of the Star of India (KCSI) – 1929
- King George V Silver Jubilee Medal – 1935
- King George VI Coronation Medal – 1937
- Indian Independence Medal – 1947

Natwarsinhji Bhavsinhji Jethwa Dynasty Born: 30 June 1901 Died: 4 October 1979
Regnal titles
Preceded by Bhavsinhji Madhavsinhji (as Maharaja of Porbandar)	Maharaja of Porbandar; 1908–1948	Succeeded by Monarchy abolished (Merge within the Dominion of India)
Titles in pretence
Preceded by None	— TITULAR — Maharaja of Porbandar; 1948–71; Reason for succession failure: Royal titles & privy purse abolished by Government of India	Succeeded by None
