= John Napier (footballer) =

Northern Irish footballer and manager

Personal information
- Full name: Robert John Napier
- Date of birth: 23 September 1946 (age 80)
- Place of birth: Lurgan, Northern Ireland
- Height: 6 ft 2 in (1.88 m)
- Position: Centre half

Senior career*
Years	Team	Apps	(Gls)
1963–1967	Bolton Wanderers	69	(2)
1967–1972	Brighton & Hove Albion	218	(5)
1972–1975	Bradford City	106	(3)
1975	→ Baltimore Comets (loan)	22	(1)
1975–1976	Mossley	24	(1)
1976	→ San Diego Jaws (loan)	22	(1)
1976–1978	Bradford City	1	(0)
Total		462	(13)

International career
	Northern Ireland U23	2	(0)
1966	Northern Ireland	1	(0)

Managerial career
- 1978: Bradford City
- * Club domestic league appearances and goals

Robert John Napier (born 23 September 1946) is a Northern Irish former football centre half and manager, who currently teaches soccer in San Diego, California.

== Biography ==
Napier was born in Lurgan. With a career as both player and coach, Napier has also been a player agent and a television and radio sports analyst.

== Career ==
=== Club playing career ===
Napier began his career in September 1963 playing for the Bolton Wanderers, where he played until 1967, when he was transferred to Brighton & Hove Albion for £25,000. He played until 1972 playing more than 200 games including two seasons as ever-present. In 1972, he was transferred to Bradford City for a record-equalling £10,000. He spent six seasons at Valley Parade interspersed with spells in America at Baltimore Comets and the same team after they became San Diego Jaws, and also at Mossley. In all he played more than 100 games at City, and served as manager, and assistant coach.

=== Club management career ===
Napier served as manager at City from February 1978 to October 1978. He was unpopular as manager of Bradford City, as the team was relegated to the now defunct Division Four. Napier returned to the United States in 1979 to take a coaching position at Pepperdine University and continues to coach soccer.

=== International career ===
Napier was a Northern Ireland schoolboy international, won 11 youth caps, two under-23 caps. He won his only full international cap against West Germany in May 1966.

== Honours ==
- Most Valuable Player, Bolton Wanderers: 1966
- Most Valuable Player, Brighton: 1969
- Football League Division Three Runner-Up, Brighton: 1971
- Most Valuable Player, Bradford City: 1973

== Managerial statistics ==
Team	Nat	Year	Record				
Team	Nat	Year	G	W	D	L	Win %
Bradford City	(England)	1978	34	11	5	18	32.35
Career Total			34	11	5	18	32.35
