= Brian Joy =

English footballer

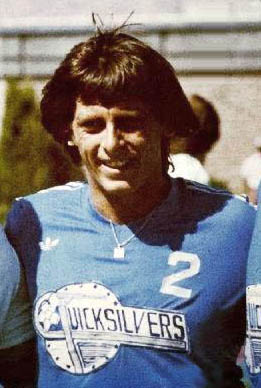
- Joy while playing for Las Vegas Quicksilver in 1977

Personal information
- Full name: Brian William Joy
- Date of birth: 26 February 1951 (age 75)
- Place of birth: Salford, Lancashire, England
- Position: Right back

Senior career*
Years	Team	Apps	(Gls)
1968–1969	Blackburn Rovers	0	(0)
1969–1970	Torquay United	27	(0)
1970–1972	Tranmere Rovers	21	(1)
1972–1973	Doncaster Rovers	34	(1)
1973–1976	Exeter City	90	(2)
1976	San Diego Jaws	24	(3)
1976–1977	York City	18	(0)
1977	Las Vegas Quicksilvers	30	(2)
1977–1978	Macclesfield Town	6	(0)
1978	San Diego Sockers	5	(0)
1980	Cleveland Cobras	16	
1980–1981	San Francisco Fog	32	(11)
- * Club domestic league appearances and goals

Brian William Joy (born 26 February 1951 in Salford, Lancashire) is an English former professional football right-back.

== Career ==
Joy began his career as an apprentice with Coventry City. He was taken on after a six-week trial at the same time they famously rejected Kevin Keegan. He played in the 1967–68 FA Youth Cup Final against Burnley, in which Coventry lost 3–2 on aggregate in the two home and away ties. He turned professional in August 1968 joining Blackburn Rovers. He failed to break into the first team at Ewood Park and left to join Torquay United in August 1969, making his league debut early the following season in a 5–1 win against Tranmere Rovers. He played 26 times for Allan Brown's side before moving to Tranmere Rovers in June 1970. He played the first 21 games of the following season, but then suffered a bad leg injury in a car accident, losing part of his right knee cap. This injury kept him out of football for 18 months before Maurice Setters, an old friend from his Coventry days and the then manager of Doncaster Rovers, gave him the chance to join the club in July 1972. He joined Rovers as a right-back, but in his one season with them, he played in eight different positions, playing 34 games before joining Exeter City in July 1973. After 90 games for the Grecians, scoring twice, he moved to the NASL to spend the 1976 season with the San Diego Jaws. In September 1976 he returned to the UK, joining York City, playing 18 times before spending the 1977 NASL season with the Las Vegas Quicksilvers. On his return to the UK, he joined Macclesfield Town, then spent one final season in the NASL with the renamed San Diego Sockers in 1978. He then suffered another injury setback after five games of the 1978 season with San Diego, hurting his right knee again. That injury resulted in the remaining part of the right knee cap being removed by top San Diego surgeon Ed Kruesser.

He then returned to playing in 1980, captaining the Cleveland Cobras of the American Soccer League (ASL) and then joining the San Francisco Fog of the Major Indoor Soccer League (MISL) for the 1980–81 indoor season. He scored 9 goals and added 15 assists before retiring from professional football at the end of that season.

== Personal life ==
Joy married Sylvia Ewing on 25 February 1973. They have three children, one of whom is former footballer and sportscaster Ian Joy.
