= Ghanshyamsinhji Daulatsinhji Jhala =

Indian cricketer and nobleman

Ghanshyamsinhji
Personal information
- Full name: Ghanshyamsinhji Daulatsinhji
- Born: 23 October 1902; Limbdi Palace, Limbdi State, British India
- Died: 10 November 1964 (aged 62); Bhavnagar, Gujarat, India
- Batting: Right-handed
- Relatives: Maharajah of Porbandar (brother-in-law)

Career statistics
Competition	FC
Matches	19
Runs scored	505
Batting average	17.41
100s/50s	0/1
Top score	57
Catches/stumpings	11/-
- Source: CricketArchive, 20 March 2014

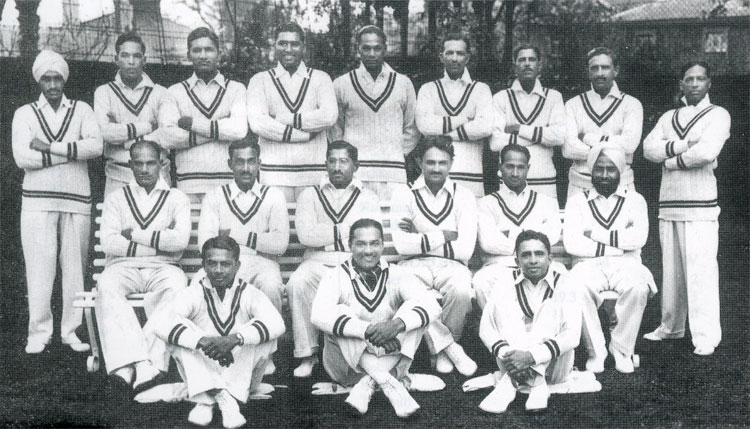
The 1932 Indian Test Cricket team that toured England. Maharaja of Porbandar, H.H. Natwarsinhji Bhavsinhji (captain), seated 3rd from right with Shri K. S. Limbdi (Vice-captain) sitting on his right and C. K. Nayudu sitting on his left.

Kumar Shri Ghanshyamsinhji Daulatsinhji Jhala of Limbdi (23 October 1902 – 10 November 1964), often known as K. S. Limbdi during his cricket career, was an Indian nobleman and first-class cricketer. He was a cousin of England Test batsman Kumar Shri Duleepsinhji and brother-in-law of Natwarsinhji Bhavsinhji, the Jethwa ruler of the Princely State of Porbandar.

Ghanshyamsinhji learnt his cricket at The Leys in Cambridge. He played a few games in India but missed history when he failed to make the playing eleven during India's Test debut. A back injury contributed to his absence. He led Western India to a Ranji Trophy victory, at the age of 40. He lived in Gujarat and played his cricket for Western India. Due to his royal connections he was vice-captain of India's tour of England in 1932, but in 11 matches he made only 154 runs at an average of 9.62.

His highest score was 57, in 1931–32, playing for his own team, KS Ghanshyamsinhji of Limbdi's XII, against Maharaj Kumar of Vizianagram's XI, in a trial match for the 1932 tour.

He was second child of the ruler of the Princely State of Limbdi, Col. HH Thakur Sahib Shri Sir Daulatsinhji Jashwantsinhji (1907-1940). Being a prince, he was also known by K.S. Limbdi (Kumar Shri Limbdi).
