= Scurti =

Scurti or Scurto is an Italian surname. It comes from the word "corto", meaning "short". Notable people with the surname include:

== Scurti ==
- Annalisa Scurti (born 1969), Italian long-distance runner
- John Scurti, American actor
- Paul Scurti (born 1951), American soccer player

== Scurto ==
- Giuseppe Scurto (born 1984), Italian footballer
