= Martin Donnelly (footballer, born 1951) =

Northern Irish former football defender

Personal information
- Date of birth: 4 January 1951 (age 75)
- Place of birth: Belfast, Northern Ireland
- Position: Defender

Senior career*
Years	Team	Apps	(Gls)
1969–1973	Distillery		
1973–1974	Kidderminster Harriers	?	(4)
1974–1979	Drogheda United	128	(24)
1979–1983	San Diego Sockers	116	(2)
1979–1980	→ Glenavon (loan)		
1981–1982	San Diego Sockers (indoor)	16	(5)
1982–1983	San Diego Sockers (MISL)	40	(9)
1983–1984	San Diego Sockers (indoor)	19	(4)
1984–1985	Las Vegas Americans (indoor)	34	(0)
1985–1986	Dallas Sidekicks (indoor)	16	(0)
1986–1987	Glenavon		
Total		132	(2)
- * Club domestic league appearances and goals

Martin Donnelly (born 4 January 1951) is a Northern Irish former football defender who played professionally in the North American Soccer League and Major Indoor Soccer League.

== Career ==
Donnelly played in the North American Soccer League for the San Diego Sockers between 1979 and 1983, making 116 outdoor appearances. During his time with the Sockers, he also played three indoor seasons, two in the NASL and one, the 1982–83 season, in the Major Indoor Soccer League. The Sockers won the MISL title that season. In May 1984, the Sockers sold both Donnelly and Alan Mayer to the Las Vegas Americans for a combined $150,000. When the Americans folded at the end of the season, Donnelly returned to San Diego where he worked briefly as a truck driver. In December 1985, he signed as a free agent for the Dallas Sidekicks.
