= Nandar =

Nandar (Persian: ناندر) may refer to:

- Nandar-e Bala

It may also refer to:

- Nandar (activist), a feminist activist in Myanmar
