= Juli Veee =

Former soccer player (born 1950)

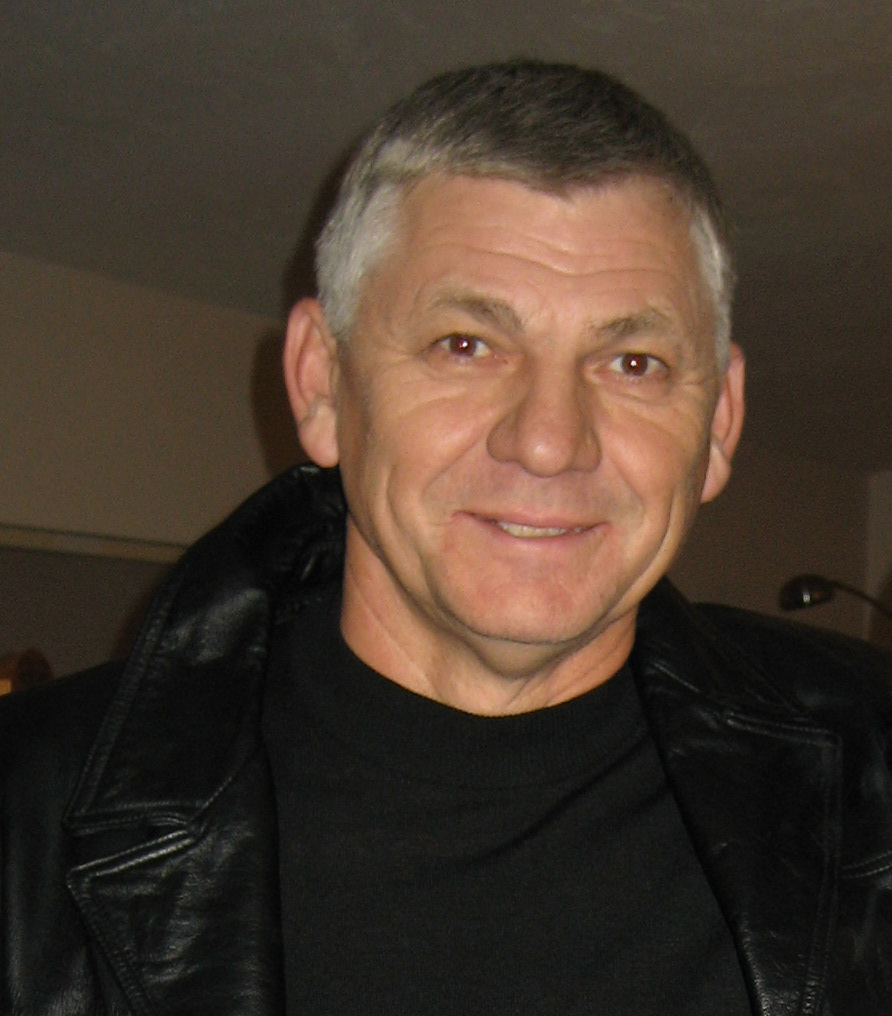
- Veee in 2005

Personal information
- Full name: Gyula Visnyei
- Date of birth: February 22, 1950 (age 76)
- Place of birth: Budapest, Hungary
- Height: 6 ft 1 in (1.85 m)
- Position: Forward

Youth career
- –1969: Vasas

Senior career*
Years	Team	Apps	(Gls)
1975	Los Angeles Aztecs	20	(6)
1976	San Jose Earthquakes (NASL indoor)	4	(8)
1976	San Jose Earthquakes	13	(0)
1976–1977	Lierse	28	(8)
1977–1978	Standard Liège	19	(5)
1978–1982	San Diego Sockers	164	(33)
1979–1980	New York Arrows (MISL)	26	(29)
1981–1982	San Diego Sockers (NASL indoor)	18	(51)
1982–1983	San Diego Sockers (MISL)	37	(57)
1983–1984	San Diego Sockers (NASL indoor)	28	(45)
1984–1985	Las Vegas Americans (MISL)	39	(50)
1985–1988	San Diego Sockers (MISL)	115	(101)

International career
- Hungary U-21
1976–1982	United States	4	(2)

Managerial career
- 2005–: La Costa Canyon High School
- * Club domestic league appearances and goals

Juli Veee (born Gyula Visnyei; February 22, 1950) is a former professional soccer player who played as a forward. Announced as "Double-deuce, triple-E, the one and only Juli Veee", Veee experienced his greatest success as an indoor player with the San Diego Sockers. Born in Hungary, he earned four caps, scoring two goals, with the United States national team.

== Early life ==
Veee grew up impoverished in Budapest, Hungary. The communist government controlled nearly every aspect of a Hungarian's life and when Veee turned fifteen he was given a choice, pursue a career in table tennis or soccer. He chose soccer. Chafing under the restrictions of his homeland under a totalitarian regime, Veee defected when he was eighteen years old while on a tour of Western Europe with the Hungarian U-21 national team. He began his professional career in France before moving to the United States.

== Club career ==
=== NASL ===
In 1975, Veee moved to the U.S. where he signed with the Los Angeles Aztecs of the North American Soccer League. That season, he played in nineteen games, scoring six goals. He was traded to the San Jose Earthquakes for the 1976 season.

At the completion of the 1976 NASL season, Veee moved to Belgium where he signed with First Division club Lierse. He spent one season with Lierse before moving to Standard Liège for the 1977–78 season. Veee returned to the NASL to play for the San Diego Sockers from 1978 to 1982. Veee was a fan favorite for the Sockers.

=== NASL indoor ===
Veee played for San Jose during the 1976 indoor tournament and led the competition with eight goals. A few years later the NASL started an indoor league, in which the Sockers participated in 1980–81, 1981–82, 1983–84. San Diego won the championship in the 1981–82 and 1983–84 seasons. Juli Veee was their star. He went on to play with the Sockers in the MISL. Overall, the Sockers won 10 indoor soccer championships (two in the NASL, and eight more in the MISL). Veee finished his career with the Sockers with 254 goals and 214 assists.

Veee was described in a 1984 Sports Illustrated article as a player "who would find it tough to hold a place on a European third-division side, [and who] recognizes that the simplistic indoor version suits his talents better than the grown-ups' game." In the same article Veee was quoted as stating, "tell the rest of the world to go on playing in the mud and rain...we'll get rich while staying clean. The future of American soccer is indoors."

=== MISL ===
Veee began his career in the Major Indoor Soccer League (MISL) with the New York Arrows. His greatest achievement in soccer probably came as he led the San Diego Sockers to five championships. He was MVP three times. He was the 1982–83 championship series MVP. At the end of the 1984 season, the Sockers traded Veee to the Las Vegas Americans for whom he played a single season. In 1985, he returned to the Sockers and finished his career with them in 1988.

== International career ==
Veee earned four caps with the United States national team after he became a U.S. citizen. His first game with the national team came in an October 15, 1976 loss to Mexico. He scored his first national team goal five days later in a victory over Canada. He played one more game in 1976, then did not earn another cap until his last one. That came in the only game the U.S. played in 1982, a 2–1 victory over Trinidad on March 21, 1982. Veee also scored his second national team goal in that game.

Veee was also a member of the United States team which qualified for the 1980 Summer Olympics. While Veee scored a goal in the U.S. tie with Suriname which led to the U.S. qualifying for the games, President Carter canceled the U.S. participation in those games as punishment for the Soviet invasion of Afghanistan. Because FIFA does not recognize Olympic and Olympic qualifying matches as full internationals, these games are not included in Veee's national team statistics.

== Post-playing career ==
After retiring in 1988, he became an artist and book collector, although these did not provide enough income at the time for him to make a living. A local youth coach who knew Veee asked him to help out with the coach's team. In need of income, he agreed and quickly discovered that he loved second career as a coach. His coaching jobs began with club teams, including three years with the SDSC Surf club and two years with the Pegasus club.

Veee would eventually become Director of Coaching for the Encinitas Soccer League. In 2005, became the head coach of the La Costa Canyon High School girls' soccer team. He decided to become a high school coach due to dissatisfaction with regression his club players experienced during the high school season. Veee concluded that the low quality of high school soccer hurt his club and decided the best way to raise that quality was through his personal attention.

In 1994, he was commissioned to be the artist for the 1994 World Cup hosted by multiple cities across the United States. An exhibition including Veee's work titled "Soccerfest, A Magical World" was held at the Los Angeles Convention Center July 8–17, 1994.

As an artist, Veee has produced hundreds of works, including a commissioned portrait of former California Governor and San Diego Mayor Pete Wilson.

In 1997, the San Diego Breitbard Hall of Fame inducted Veee, the first soccer player so honored. He was also selected as an inaugural member of the Indoor Soccer Hall of Fame in 2011.
