= Peter Silvester (footballer) =

English footballer

Personal information
- Full name: Peter Dennis Silvester
- Date of birth: 19 December 1948 (age 77)
- Place of birth: Wokingham, England
- Height: 5 ft 11 in (1.80 m)
- Position: Forward

Senior career*
Years	Team	Apps	(Gls)
1965–1969	Reading	79	(26)
1969–1973	Norwich City	100	(37)
1973	→ Colchester United (loan)	4	(0)
1973–1977	Southend United	81	(32)
1974	→ Baltimore Comets (loan)	18	(14)
1974–1975	→ Reading (loan)	2	(0)
1975	→ Baltimore Comets (loan)	19	(5)
1976	→ San Diego Jaws (loan)	14	(4)
1976	→ Vancouver Whitecaps (loan)	4	(1)
1976–1977	→ Blackburn Rovers (loan)	5	(1)
1977	Washington Diplomats	12	(3)
1977–1978	Cambridge United	4	(1)
1978–19??	Maidstone United		
- * Club domestic league appearances and goals

Peter Dennis Silvester (born 19 February 1948) is an English former football forward.

Silvester, a striker, began his professional career with Reading, with whom he played from 1965 to 1970, scoring 26 goals. He then joined Norwich City, with whom he won the Second Division championship in 1972 and scored 37 goals in 100 appearances. He went on to play for Colchester United, Southend United, Reading on loan, Blackburn Rovers and Cambridge United before playing in the United States for Baltimore Comets, Vancouver Whitecaps, San Diego Jaws and Washington Diplomats.
