= Jean Willrich =

German-American soccer player

Personal information
- Date of birth: April 27, 1953 (age 73)
- Place of birth: Koblenz, West Germany
- Position: Forward

Senior career*
Years	Team	Apps	(Gls)
1976–1977	PSV Eindhoven	3	(0)
1977–1978	MVV Maastricht		
1978–1984	San Diego Sockers	172	(31)
1978	→ Holstein Kiel (loan)		
1979–1980	→ UNAM Pumas (loan)		
1980–1988	San Diego Sockers (indoor)	204	(115)
1990–1992	Wichita Wings (indoor)	85	(25)

Managerial career
- Rancho Bernado High School
- * Club domestic league appearances and goals

Jean Wilhelm Willrich (born April 27, 1953) is a German-American soccer player who played as a forward. He played in his native Germany, then two seasons in the Netherlands, eight in the North American Soccer League and twelve in the Major Indoor Soccer League.

== Playing career ==
=== Europe ===
Willrich, born in Koblenz, Germany, to a German mother and a French father, began playing club soccer at TuS Neuendorf and later joined Andernach before heading to Sportfreunde Eisbachtal. In 1976, he was signed by Dutch First Division club PSV Eindhoven. During the 1976–77 season, he saw action in only four games and was loaned to MVV Maastricht for the 1977–1978 season.

=== San Diego Sockers ===
In 1978, Willrich moved to the United States and signed with the San Diego Sockers of the North American Soccer League (NASL). The Sockers had played the 1977 NASL season as the Las Vegas Quicksilvers before moving to San Diego and changing its name to the Sockers. In September 1978, he was loaned by German 2. Bundesliga side Holstein Kiel. In 1979 and 1980, the Sockers negotiated a deal with the Mexican Primera Division club UNAM Pumas to exchange players during the offseason. The Mexican league played in the fall, winter and early spring while the NASL played in the spring and summer. As part of this exchange, Willrich spent time with UNAM in 1979 and 1980.

During its years playing outdoor soccer in the NASL, the Sockers were a decent, but not dominant team. The NASL introduced an indoor soccer season in 1979–80, however, San Diego did not participate. The following indoor season 1980–81, was the Sockers' first. That year they failed to qualify for the playoffs but the next year (1981–82, they swept to the championship. The NASL decided against an indoor season in 1982–1983 so, at the completion of the NASL outdoor season in 1982, the Sockers jumped to Major Indoor Soccer League (MISL) where it again won the 1982–83 MISL championship. The next year (1983–84), the NASL ran its last indoor season and the Sockers took that title as well. Willrich was named MVP of the 1984 Indoor Championship Series having scored 7 goals in the three-game sweep of New York. At the end of the 1984 outdoor season, the NASL collapsed and the Sockers moved permanently to MISL.

Willrich remained with the Sockers through all this, growing into a powerful and reliable forward. In his first season with the team, he scored nine goals in thirty games. While that was a decent number, he blossomed when playing indoors. During the Sockers run to the 1980–1981 NASL indoor title, Willrich was second in team scoring with sixteen goals. He continued to enjoy a scoring touch as he helped the Sockers to 6 consecutive indoor titles through the 1987–88 season. The San Diego Sockers inducted Willrich into their Hall of Fame.

=== Wichita Wings ===
Willrich played with the Wichita Wings from 1990 to 1992.

=== U.S. Olympic team ===
Willrich married a U.S. citizen in February 1981 and was granted permanent residence in the United States in August 1981. Willrich gained his U.S. citizenship shortly before the 1984 Olympic Games, he benefited from an expedited processing of his naturalization application. U.S. Olympic Soccer Team head coach Alkis Panagoulias had supported Willrich's naturalization process, stating in a letter that if Willrich could play for the U.S. Olympic Team that could "dramatically change the chances of the United States winning a medal in the Los Angeles games of 1984". After having become a U.S. citizen, Willrich was selected for the U.S. Olympic soccer team which competed at the 1984 Summer Olympics in Los Angeles. In the first game, against Costa Rica, Willrich both scored and assisted on a goal in the U.S. victory. Despite this achievement, he was never called up to the full U.S. national team.

== Coaching career ==
After retiring from playing professionally, Willrich started coaching in 1989. He coached the Rancho Bernardo High School soccer team and organized youth soccer camps and clinics in the San Diego area for many years. From 1997 to 2000, he was a coach with the U.S. Soccer Olympic Development Program (ODP). He also coached at Scripps Ranch Soccer Club.
