= Paul Scurti =

American soccer player (born 1951)

Personal information
- Full name: Paolo Scurti
- Date of birth: October 2, 1951 (age 75)
- Place of birth: Spoltore, Italy
- Position: Midfielder

Senior career*
Years	Team	Apps	(Gls)
1972–1973	Baltimore Bays		
1974–1975	Baltimore Comets	28	(0)
1975	Baltimore Comets (indoor)	2	(2)
1976	San Diego Jaws	15	(1)
1978	California Surf	2	(0)

International career
1975	United States	1	(0)
- * Club domestic league appearances and goals

Paolo "Paul" Scurti was a soccer player who played as a midfielder who spent five seasons in the North American Soccer League. Born in Italy, earned one cap for the United States national team.

== Professional ==
Scurti moved to the United States with his family when he was eleven. In 1972, he signed with the Baltimore Bays of the American Soccer League. In 1974, he moved to the Baltimore Comets of the North American Soccer League. He played the 1974 and 1975 NASL seasons in Baltimore, and moved along with the team when it became the San Diego Jaws for the 1976 season. He played the 1978 season with the California Surf but played only two games with them.

== National team ==
Scurti earned his one cap with the national team in a 7–0 loss to Poland on March 26, 1975. He started the game, but was taken off for Pat McBride in the 62nd minute. He also played an unofficial game, a 10–0 loss to Italy on April 2, 1975. In that game, he came off at halftime for Alex Skotarek.
