= Udaybhansinhji Regional Institute of Co-operative Management =

Udaybhansinhji Regional Institute of Cooperative Management (URICM) is one of the five Regional Institutes of Co-operative Management in the country. It is situated at Sector-30 Gandhinagar in Gujarat.

== History ==
It was established in 1956 and is named after Udaybhansinhji, a leader of cooperative movement and the founder Chairman of Indian Farmers Fertiliser Cooperative (IFFCO). Institute was founded in 1956 at Bhavnagar and later shifted to its present location in Gandhinagar.

== Current Status & Courses ==
It is administered by the National Council for Cooperative training, training wing of National Co-operative Union of India (NCUI), New Delhi. The institute trains cadres to serve as professional managers to hold key position in ever growing numbers of cooperatives in India.

It provides following courses:-

- Diploma in Sales & Marketing Management
- Post Graduate Diploma In Management ( Agri. Business)

The course is 2 Year Post Graduate Diploma In Management (Agri. Business).

- Barefoot Technician

The Course is 3 months for barefoot

- Higher Diploma in Cooperative Management

The course is 6 months Higher Diploma in Cooperative Management.
