= Las Vegas Quicksilvers =

Defunct American soccer club

- Full name: Las Vegas Quicksilvers
- Nickname: Silvers
- Founded: 1976
- Dissolved: 1978; 48 years ago (moved)
- Stadium: Las Vegas Stadium
- Capacity: 36,800
- League: NASL
- 1977: 5th in conference
Home colors	Away colors

The Las Vegas Quicksilvers were an American soccer team that competed in the North American Soccer League (NASL) during the 1977 season. The team was based in Las Vegas, Nevada, and played their home games at Las Vegas Stadium. After the 1977 season, the team relocated to San Diego and became the San Diego Sockers.

Eusébio, considered by many to be one of the greatest players of all time, played seventeen matches and scored two goals for the Quicksilvers.

== History ==
=== Origins ===
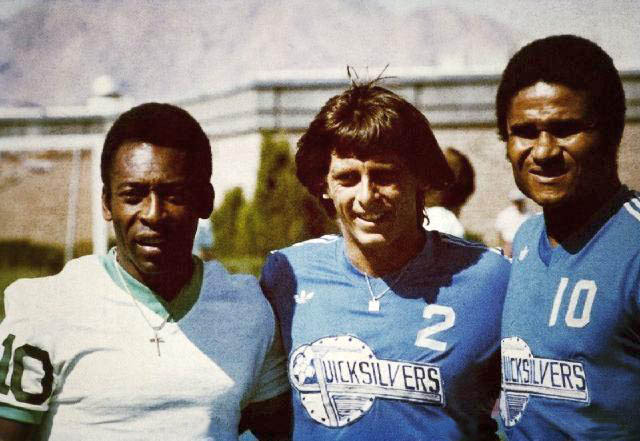
Eusébio (right) during his time with the Quicksilvers, here with Pelé (left) and teammate Brian Joy (center)

The team that would become the Quicksilvers was founded in January 1974 as the Baltimore Comets when the North American Soccer League added six expansion teams following the 1973 season. After two seasons in Baltimore, the team was sold and moved to San Diego, becoming the San Diego Jaws. After finishing last in the Southern Division for the 1976 North American Soccer League season, the team announced it would move to Las Vegas.

=== 1977 NASL season and demise ===
The Quicksilvers opened the season on April 9, 1977, at home with a 1–0 win against the New York Cosmos with 11,896 fans in attendance at Las Vegas Stadium. The game was the tenth meeting in history between Eusébio and Pelé, considered by many to be the two finest players of the era. After starting the season with nine wins and three loses, the team lost seven of their next eight games; head coach Derek Trevis was fired and replaced by Jim Fryatt. The team finished the season in last place of the Pacific Conference Southern Division with eleven wins and fifteen losses and averaging 7,092 fans a game.

The Quicksilvers were broadcast on local radio by KORK, now KRLV (AM). While there was a local television program on KSHO (now KTNV) there's no evidence that station, or any other, televised the Quicksilvers' matches.

In late October 1977, it was reported the Milwaukee Brewers considered purchasing the team. However, less than a week later the Clark County District Attorney filed a civil suit against the team for deceptive trade and false advertising. The Las Vegas Convention and Visitors Authority also threatened the team with legal action over $32,000 in unpaid rent for the Las Vegas Stadium. In December, the team was sold and moved to San Diego becoming the San Diego Sockers.

== Year-by-year ==
Year	League	W	L	Pts	Reg. season	Playoffs
1977	NASL	11	15	103	5th, Pacific Conference, Southern Division	did not qualify

== Coaches ==
- (England) Derek Trevis
- (England) Jim Fryatt

== Honors ==
NASL All-Stars

- 1977: Wolfgang Sühnholz (1st team); Humberto Coelho, Alan Mayer (2nd team)

Indoor Soccer Hall of Fame members

- 2019: Alan Mayer
