= Daulatsinhji =

Thakore of Limbdi from 1907 to 1940

- Maharana

Thakore of Limbdi
- Reign: 15 April 1907 – 30 September 1940
- Predecessor: Jaswantsinhji
- Successor: Digvijaysinhji
- Born: Dadbha Muluji; 11 July 1868
- Died: 30 September 1940 (aged 72)
- Spouse: Baluba (m. 1883)
- Issue Detail: Digvijaysinhji; Pratapsinhji; Fatehsinhji; Ghanshyamsinhji; Rupaliba; Pratapba
- Father: Muluji
- Mother: Jijiba

Daulatsinhji (Dadbha Muluji; 11 July 1868 – 30 September 1940) was Thakore of Limbdi from 15 April 1907 until his death in 1940.

== Early life, family, and education ==
Daulatsinhji was born as Dadbha in Bodi on 11 July 1868 as the seventh child of Muluji and his wife Jijiba. He received his preliminary education in Bodi from a Brahmin, following which, he was educated at Jamnagar High School. He received his military training at Pune, Deesa, Shimla, Mathura and Meerut. Since his paternal family was very closely related to the royal house of Nawanagar, he spent a portion of his life there. In Nawanagar, he was entrusted to organise that state's Imperial Service Troops, and served as its commanding oficer. He was among the select officers and men from the British Indian Army and the Imperial Service Troops who were sent to Australia by the Government of India for the opening of the Parliament of Australia in 1901 by Prince George, Duke of Cornwall and York, later King George V. During the minority of Jaswantsinhji Vibhaji, he served as an advisor to Mr. Kennedy, the political agent stationed in Nawanagar, who was supervising the administration of the state. When Jaswantsinhji came of age and was invested with full administrative powers, Daulatsinhji, due to a difference of opinion with him, resigned and joined the service of ruler of Porbandar. While in Porbandar, he served as the commander-in-chief. He married in 1883 to Baluba, a daughter of Jadeja Jetiji of Panchasara. He also had an English mistress. He had four sons: Digvijaysinhji, Pratapsinhji, Fatehsinhji and Ghanshyamsinhji, and two daughters: Rupaliba and Pratapba.

== Reign ==
When Jaswantsinhji Fatehsinhji died in 1907 without leaving behind any issue to succeed him as the Thakore of Limbdi, his widow Bama Shri Dev Kunverba a princess of Rajpipla State as per his desire, adopted Dadhba as the deceased's heir and successor on 6 May 1908. This was disputed by another claimant for the vacant throne, but the Government of India acceded to the wishes of Jaswantsinhji and recognised him to the deceased's titles with effect from 15 April 1907. He on the occasion took the name of Daulatsinhji. He was invested with full administrative powers on 14 April 1908 by P. S. V. Fitzgerald, the then Agent in Kathiawar to the governor of Bombay. He had made education gratis throughout his state. Besides that, he did much to encourage trade, especially that of cotton. In 1910, when Digvijaysinhji was married to Nand Kunverba, the only daughter of HH Maharaja Sir Kesarisinhji of Idar State introduced several scholarships for the assistance of students who wanted to continue their studies. He replanned and rebuilt his capital city of Limbdi. He travelled to England, France, Italy, Belgium, Switzerland, Austria, Hungary and Germany in the year 1912.

To mark the 25th anniversary of his accession to the throne of Limbdi, he celebrated his silver jubilee on 10 April 1935. He only agreed to celebrate the occasion after he was assured that most of the jubilee contributions would be spent on building and equipping the Jubilee Memorial Hospital and the Baluba Maternity Home at Limbdi, and announced a number of boons for his subjects at the cost of Rs 10,00,000. His people presented him an address during the festivities and in it said:

You have been a veritable father to your subjects. A noble idealism guides Your Highness’ activities. The justification and success of monarchy lies in treating the subjects as one’s own family. Your Highness typifies this glorious ideal in your life and life-work.

He in 1930-1931 helped the British to crush the civil disobedience movement. Following which an agent to the governor-general of India said this of his conduct:.

There are few rulers in India and certainly none in this agency more completely and whole-heartedly loyal to the British connection.

He also built Shri Daulatsinhji Bridge on Bhogavo river that was opened on 15 January 1936 by the Marquess of Willingdon. On the same date, the Marquess of Willingdon opened Ram Rajendrasinhji Hospital at Limbdi, which he had built in memory of his grandson. In late 1938, when an uprising arose against him over administrative abuses and lavish spending, he had to form a Praja Mandal in his state. In February 1939, thousands of his subjects fled en masse into British India. When Vallabhbhai Patel organised a boycott of Limbdi's cotton, which was the main export of the state, he conceded minor administrative reforms, such as giving an advisory committee a role in running Limbdi town, and promised to establish village councils. That brought most émigrés back by July 1939.

== Death ==
He died on 30 September 1940 and was succeeded by Digvijaysinhji to his title, rank, and dignity.

== Honours ==
He was made Knight Commander of the Order of the Indian Empire on 1 January 1921 and Knight Commander of the Order of the Star of India on 1 January 1931.
