= 1974 Ballon d'Or =

Annual association football award event in France

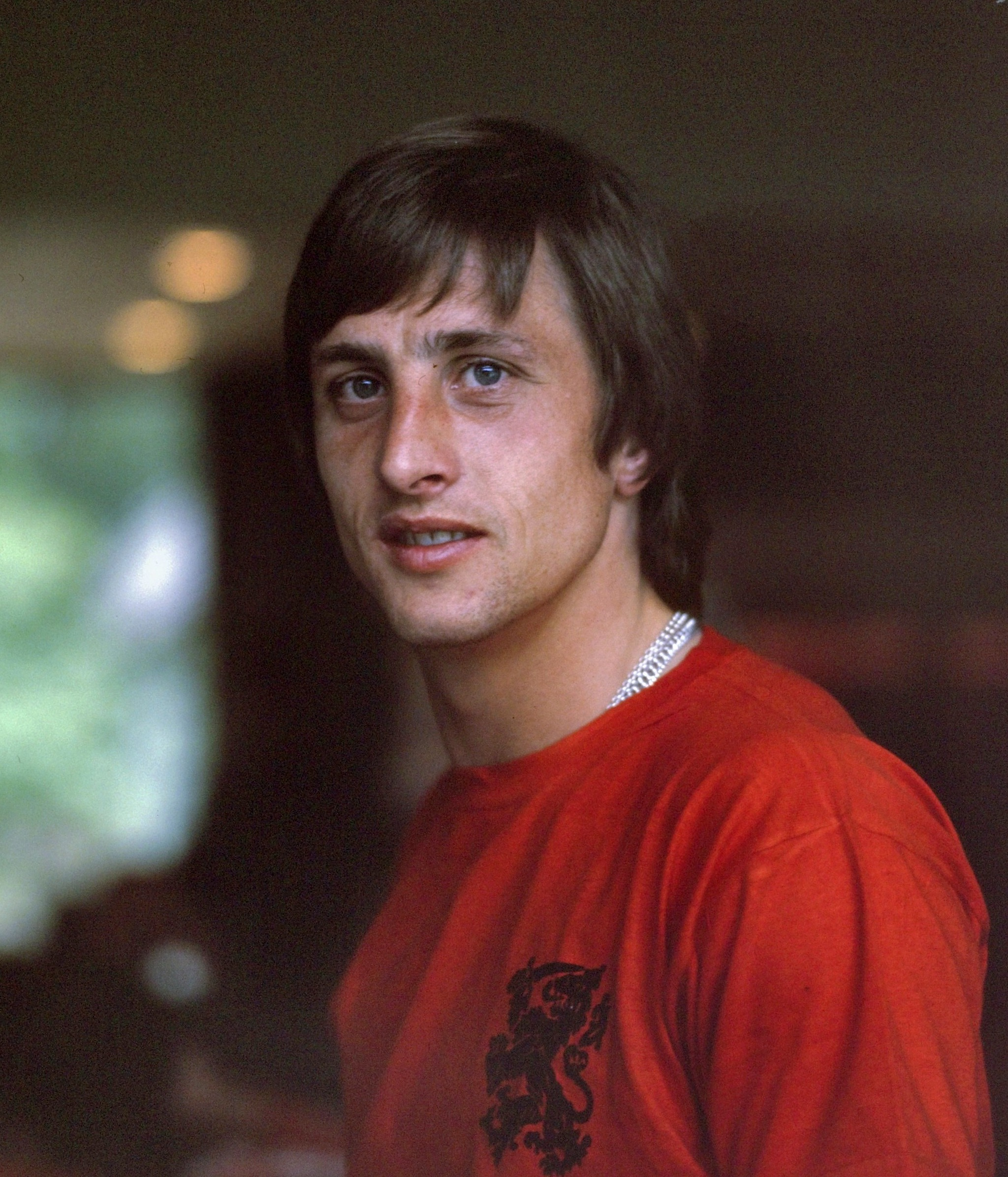
- 1974 Ballon d'Or winner, Johan Cruyff
- Date: 31 December 1974
- Presented by: France Football

Highlights
- Won by: (Netherlands) Johan Cruyff (3rd award)
- Website: ballondor.com

The 1974 Ballon d'Or, given to the best football player in Europe as judged by a panel of sports journalists from UEFA member countries, was awarded to the Dutch striker Johan Cruyff on 31 December 1974. There were 26 voters, from Austria, Belgium, Bulgaria, Czechoslovakia, Denmark, East Germany, England, Finland, France, Greece, Hungary, Italy, Luxembourg, the Netherlands, Norway, Poland, Portugal, Republic of Ireland, Romania, Soviet Union, Spain, Sweden, Switzerland, Turkey, West Germany and Yugoslavia. Cruyff became the first footballer to earn the award three times, following up from his wins in 1971 and 1973. French playmaker Michel Platini and Dutch compatriot Marco van Basten also won the Ballon d'Or three times after him.

== Rankings ==
Rank	Name	Club(s)	Nationality	Points
1	Johan Cruyff	(Spain) Barcelona	Netherlands	116
2	Franz Beckenbauer	(West Germany) Bayern Munich	West Germany	105
3	Kazimierz Deyna	(Poland) Legia Warsaw	Poland	35
4	Paul Breitner	(West Germany) Bayern Munich	West Germany	32
5	Johan Neeskens	(Spain) Barcelona	Netherlands	21
6	Grzegorz Lato	(Poland) Stal Mielec	Poland	16
7	Gerd Müller	(West Germany) Bayern Munich	West Germany	14
8	Robert Gadocha	(Poland) Legia Warsaw	Poland	11
9	Billy Bremner	(England) Leeds United	Scotland	9
10	Ralf Edström	(Netherlands) PSV Eindhoven	Sweden	4
10	Jürgen Sparwasser	(East Germany) 1. FC Magdeburg	East Germany	4
10	Berti Vogts	(West Germany) Borussia Mönchengladbach	West Germany	4
13	Ronnie Hellström	(West Germany) 1. FC Kaiserslautern	Sweden	3
13	Jan Tomaszewski	(Poland) ŁKS Łódź	Poland	3
15	José Altafini	(Italy) Juventus	Italy	2
15	Hristo Bonev	(Bulgaria) Lokomotiv Plovdiv	Bulgaria	2
15	Jerzy Gorgoń	(Poland) Górnik Zabrze	Poland	2
15	Sepp Maier	(West Germany) Bayern Munich	West Germany	2
19	Oleg Blokhin	(Soviet Union) Dynamo Kyiv	Soviet Union	1
19	Rainer Bonhof	(West Germany) Borussia Mönchengladbach	West Germany	1
19	Jean-Marc Guillou	(France) Angers	France	1
19	Uli Hoeneß	(West Germany) Bayern Munich	West Germany	1
19	Branko Oblak	(Socialist Federal Republic of Yugoslavia) Hajduk Split	Yugoslavia	1
