= Digvijaysinhji =

Thakore of Limbdi from 1940 to 1941

- Maharana

Thakore of Limbdi
- Reign: 30 September 1940 – 6 January 1941
- Predecessor: Daulatsinhji
- Successor: Chhatrasalji
- Born: 10 April 1896
- Died: 6 January 1941 (aged 44)
- Wife: Nand Kunverba (m. 1910)
- Issue Detail: Ramrajendrasinhji; Prem Kunverba; Dharmendra Kunverba; Chhatrasalji
- Father: Daulatsinhji
- Mother: Baluba
- Education: Eton College; Rajkumar College, Rajkot

Digvijaysinhji (10 April 1896 – 6 January 1941) was Thakore of Limbdi from 30 September 1940 until his death in 1941.

== Early life, family, and education ==
Digvijaysinhji was born on 10 April 1896 at Jamnagar to Daulatsinhji and his wife Baluba. He was first educated at Rajkumar College in Rajkot and then at Eton College in Eton. He married twice. Firstly, in 1910, to Nand Kunverba, the only daughter of Kesarisinhji, the Maharaja of Idar. This marriage was proposed by Pratap Singh. To mark this marriage, his father established several scholarships to help aid students. By his first wife, he had one son, Ramrajendrasinhji, and two daughters, Prem Kunverba and Dharmendra Kunverba. By his second wife, he had a son, Chhatrasalji. He attended the Delhi Durbar of 1911 with his father.

== Reign ==
Upon the death of his father on 30 September 1940, he succeeded him to the rank, dignity and title of the Thakore of Limbdi. However, his reign was short-lived, as he died 3 months and 7 days after his accession to the throne.

== Death ==
He died on 6 January 1941 and was succeeded by Chhatrasalji as the Thakore of Limbdi.
