= Kevin Crow =

American soccer player and coach

Personal information
- Full name: Kevin Troy Crow
- Date of birth: September 17, 1961 (age 65)
- Place of birth: Berkeley, California, United States
- Position: Defender

Youth career
- 1979–1982: San Diego State

Senior career*
Years	Team	Apps	(Gls)
1983–1984	San Diego Sockers	52	(5)
1983–1984	San Diego Sockers (NASL indoor)	23	(6)
1984–1992	San Diego Sockers (MISL)	350	(66)
1993–1996	San Diego Sockers (CISL)		

International career
1984–1988	United States	13	(0)

Managerial career
- 2002: San Diego Spirit (interim)
- * Club domestic league appearances and goals

Kevin Troy Crow (born September 17, 1961) is an American former soccer defender. He played two seasons in the North American Soccer League, eight in the Major Indoor Soccer League and four in the Continental Indoor Soccer League, all with the San Diego Sockers. He was a first team NASL All Star, a five-time MISL All Star and a five-time Defender of the Year. He earned thirteen caps with the U.S. national team from 1984 to 1988. His national team career included all three U.S. games at both the 1984 and 1988 Summer Olympics. He was the general manager of the San Diego Spirit and the chief operating officer of the Women's United Soccer Association. He has served on the United States Soccer Federation Board of Directors.

== Youth and college ==
A Bay Area product, Crow was a member of the Ballistic United Soccer Club. Crow graduated from Amador Valley High School in 1978. After high school, he attended San Diego State University where he played on the men's soccer team from 1979 to 1982. He was named All-American as a sophomore. In 1989, he was inducted into the Aztec Hall of Fame. Crow received a bachelor's degree in finance from SDSU.

== San Diego Sockers ==
=== NASL ===
In 1983, Crow signed with the San Diego Sockers of the North American Soccer League (NASL). He played the final two seasons of the NASL in 1983 and 1984 being named a first team NASL All Star in 1984. He was part of the Sockers team that won the 1983–84 NASL indoor title.

=== MISL ===
When the NASL folded at the end of the 1984 NASL season, the Sockers jumped to the Major Indoor Soccer League (MISL). The Sockers established themselves as the class of the league, winning the 1985 and 1986 titles, before losing in the 1987 semifinals. The Sockers resumed their championship, taking MISL titles from 1988 to 1992. During those years, Crow won the Defender of the Year award in 1985, 1988, 1989, 1991, and 1992.

=== CISL ===
MISL folded after the 1991–1992 season and the Sockers moved to the Continental Indoor Soccer League (CISL) for four seasons until folding in 1996. Crow continued to play until retiring as a player in 1996.

== National and Olympic teams ==
Crow entered the U.S. national team program at the 1984 Summer Olympics. While the tournament had traditionally been an amateur-only tournament, in 1984 the International Olympic Committee allowed professionals and U.S. coach Alketas Panagoulias selected Crow to the U.S. roster. Crow played all three games as the U.S. went 1-1-1 in group play and failed to qualify for the second round.

Crow earned his first of thirteen caps with the U.S. national team in a scoreless tie with Italy on May 30, 1984. He continued to play as a regular during the world cup qualifiers, including the 1–0 loss to Costa Rica on May 31, 1985, that knocked the U.S. out of contention for the finals.

In 1987, Crow played for the U.S. at the 1987 Pan American Games. The U.S. went 1-1-1 in group play and failed to qualify for the second round. He was selected for the U.S. team at the 1988 Summer Olympics. The U.S. went 1-1-1 in group play and again failed to qualify for the second round.

Crow played two World Cup qualifiers in 1988, earning his last cap in a 5–1 win over Jamaica on August 13, 1988.

== Coaching ==
In June 2002, Crow was the general manager of the San Diego Spirit women's soccer team. When the team fired head coach Carlos Juarez, Crow became the interim coach until a replacement was found.

== Post-playing career ==
Crow has been active as a business manager. He was president of ZipDirect, a printing, mailing, and shipping company from February 1994 to September 2000. In 2000, Crow became the general manager of the San Diego Spirit of the Women's United Soccer Association (WUSA) from 2001 to 2003, when the team folded. On August 2, 2002, the WUSA announced the elevation of Crow to the position of chief operating officer for the league. After the general manager of the Power was fired in May 2003, Crow temporarily took over management of the Power. Crow also sat on the United States Soccer Federation (USSF) Board of Directors.

== Honors ==
NASL Indoor Champion (1)

- 1983–84

MISL Champion (7)

- 1984–85, 1985–86, 1987–88, 1988–89, 1989–90, 1990–91, 1991–92

MISL Defender of the Year (5)

- 1985, 1988, 1989, 1991, 1992

Championship Series Unsung Hero

- 1992

First Team All Star (6)

- NASL: 1984
- MISL: 1985, 1987, 1988, 1990, 1991
