= David Banks (soccer) =

American soccer player-coach

Personal information
- Full name: David A. Banks
- Date of birth: December 17, 1967 (age 58)
- Place of birth: Wigan, England
- Height: 5 ft 10 in (1.78 m)
- Position: Defender

Youth career
- 1983–1985: Wigan Athletic
- 1986–1989: Philadelphia Textile

Senior career*
Years	Team	Apps	(Gls)
1990–1996	San Diego Sockers (indoor)	220	(58)
1992–1993	Denver Thunder (indoor)	8	(3)
1996	St. Louis Ambush (indoor)	3	(1)
1997–1999	Buffalo Blizzard (indoor)	92	(22)
1997	Houston Hotshots (indoor)	36	(6)
1998	Charleston Battery	25	(0)
1999–2000	San Diego Flash	26	(0)
Total		410	(90)

Managerial career
- 1993–1995: La Jolla High School
- 1999–2003: UC San Diego (assistant)
- 2001: La Jolla High School
- * Club domestic league appearances and goals

David Banks (born December 17, 1967, in Wigan, England) was an English-American soccer defender who is currently the Director of Notts F.C., a youth soccer team in San Diego, California. He was the 1991 Major Soccer League Rookie of the Year and played in the Continental Indoor Soccer League, National Professional Soccer League, USISL and USL A-League.

== Player ==
=== Youth ===
In 1983, Banks joined Wigan Athletic as an apprentice He played 79 youth and reserve team games for Wigan over two seasons. In 1986, Banks entered Philadelphia Textile where he played on the men's soccer team from 1986 to 1989. He led the team in goals with 10 in 1989 and is ninth on the career assists list with 20. He was selected as a first team All American his senior season. Banks was inducted into the Philadelphia Textile Athletic Hall of Fame in 1992.

=== Professional ===
In 1990, Banks signed with the San Diego Sockers of the Major Soccer League. The Sockers won the championship as Banks earned Rookie of the Year. The Sockers repeated as champions in 1992, but the league collapsed during the offseason. Banks spent part of the 1992–1993 National Professional Soccer League (NPSL) season playing for the Denver Thunder. In the summer of 1993, the Sockers became founding members of the Continental Indoor Soccer League (CISL). The team finished as runner-up in the first CISL championship with Banks being named as a first team All Star. That year, Banks was also named captain, a position he held through the 1996 season. The Sockers folded in 1996 and Banks began the 1996–1997 NPSL season with the St. Louis Ambush before moving to the Buffalo Blizzard for the end of the season. He would continue to play for Buffalo through the end of the 1998–1999 NPSL season. In 1997, he spent the summer with the Houston Hotshots of the CISL. He then spent the summer of 1998 with the Charleston Battery of the USISL. In 1999, Banks moved to the San Diego Flash of the USL A-League. He ended his career with the Flash in 2000. In 2000, Banks was a second team USISL All Star. That season, he played 25 games for the Flash.

== Coach ==
Banks has an extensive coaching resume. He began coaching in 1993 with the La Jolla High School girls team. He coached three seasons, then returned in 2001, taking the team to the state championship. In 1999, he joined the University of California, San Diego women's team as an assistant coach, a position he held until 2003. In 1999, he became the Director of Coaching with the San Diego Fire F.C. youth club before moving to Nott's Forest F.C. in 2004–2021. Currently in 2022, Albion SC San Diego Technical Director & DPL women's director. Holds a USSF 'A' license.
