= Patvi =

Patvi may refer to:

- Patvi, honorific title used by Yuvraj indicating that he is the Crown Prince in India. It is generally used preceding the other title like Namdar and Kunwar. For Example : Patvi Namdar or Patvi Kunwar.
- Patvi, surname in the Savji community of India
- Patvi, dialect of the Malvi language in the Malwa region of India
