= Kazimierz Deyna =

Polish footballer (1947-1989)

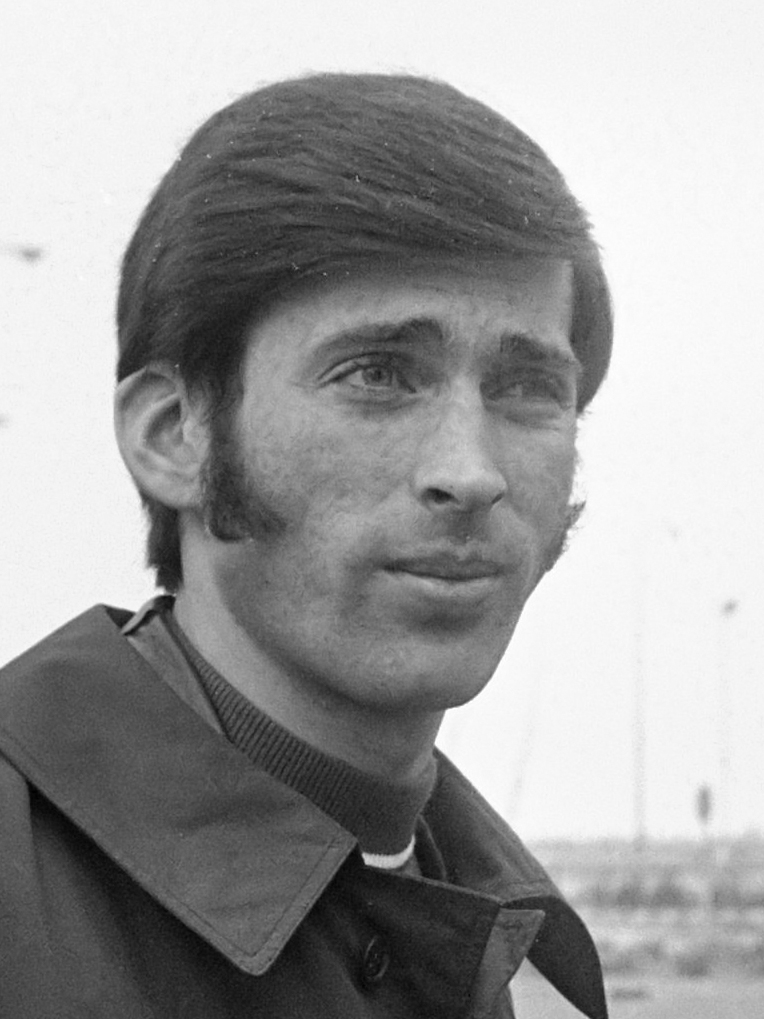
- Deyna in 1970

Personal information
- Full name: Kazimierz Deyna
- Date of birth: 23 October 1947
- Place of birth: Starogard, Poland
- Date of death: 1 September 1989 (aged 41)
- Place of death: San Diego, California, United States
- Height: 1.80 m (5 ft 11 in)
- Position: Attacking midfielder

Youth career
- 1958–1966: Włókniarz Starogard Gdański

Senior career*
Years	Team	Apps	(Gls)
1966	ŁKS Łódź	1	(0)
1966–1978	Legia Warsaw	304	(93)
1978–1981	Manchester City	38	(12)
1981–1984	San Diego Sockers	90	(44)
1981–1987	San Diego Sockers (indoor)	169	(118)
Total		602	(267)

International career
1968–1978	Poland	97	(41)
Medal record
Men's football
Representing Poland
FIFA World Cup
Third place	1974 West Germany
Olympic Games
Gold medal – first place	1972 Munich	Team
Silver medal – second place	1976 Montréal	Team
- * Club domestic league appearances and goals

Kazimierz Deyna (Polish pronunciation: [kaˈʑimjɛʐ ˈdɛjna]; (Note: In isolation, Kazimierz is pronounced [kaˈʑimjɛʂ].) 23 October 1947 – 1 September 1989) was a Polish professional footballer who played as an attacking midfielder in the playmaker role and was one of the most highly regarded players of his generation, due to his excellent vision. Throughout his career he played for such clubs as Legia Warsaw, Manchester City and San Diego Sockers.

At the international level, he earned 97 caps and scored 41 goals helping Poland claim 3rd place at the 1974 FIFA World Cup. At the 1972 Summer Olympics, he won gold with Poland and was the top goalscorer of the tournament. From 1973 to 1978, he served as captain of the national representation. In 1976, he won silver medal at the 1976 Summer Olympics.

In 1973 and 1974, he won the Polish Footballer of the Year Award. In 1974, he claimed third place in the Ballon d'Or. He was named "the greatest Polish footballer of the 20th century" by the Piłka Nożna football weekly.

== Early life ==
Deyna was born in Starogard to Franciszek (1911–1976), a dairy worker, and Jadwiga (1917–1981), a housewife. He had six sisters and two brothers, Henryk and Franciszek, who also were footballers. Henryk played for Włókniarz Starogard Gdański, while Franciszek was a Starogardzki KS player.

== Club career ==
=== Legia Warsaw ===
Deyna began playing youth football in 1958 at his local club Włókniarz Starogard Gdański. In 1966 he made one appearance for ŁKS Łódź (on 8 October in a 0–0 draw against Górnik Zabrze). But he was quickly snapped up by Legia Warsaw. In communist Poland each team had its own "sponsor". The Warsaw club was much more powerful as it was the military club. Moreover, it was the favourite club of the authorities. Deyna was called up into the army and in this way he had to play for Legia Warsaw. He made a name for himself during his first season, becoming one of Legia's most important players. In 1969 and 1970 his team won the Polish Championship. After his performances at the 1974 World Cup, European top teams like AS Saint-Étienne, AS Monaco, Real Madrid and Bayern Munich tried to acquire his services but he was unable to join, since the communist regime in Poland prevented him from moving to Western Europe. Real Madrid was so determined to acquire Deyna that they sent a shirt to Warsaw with his name and number "14".

=== Manchester City ===
Soon afterwards Deyna was transferred to English club Manchester City, making his debut in November 1978, and being one of the first wave of overseas players to play in the English league. His time in England was marred by a series of injuries, and he left in January 1981, shortly after Manchester City made a managerial change, having made only 43 appearances in all competitions. However, he was regarded as an exceptionally gifted playmaker and became a cult figure with City fans. Deyna scored thirteen goals in his time with the club. Furthermore, his seven goals in the last eight games of the 1978–79 season were crucial for Manchester City in their relegation battle.

=== San Diego Sockers ===
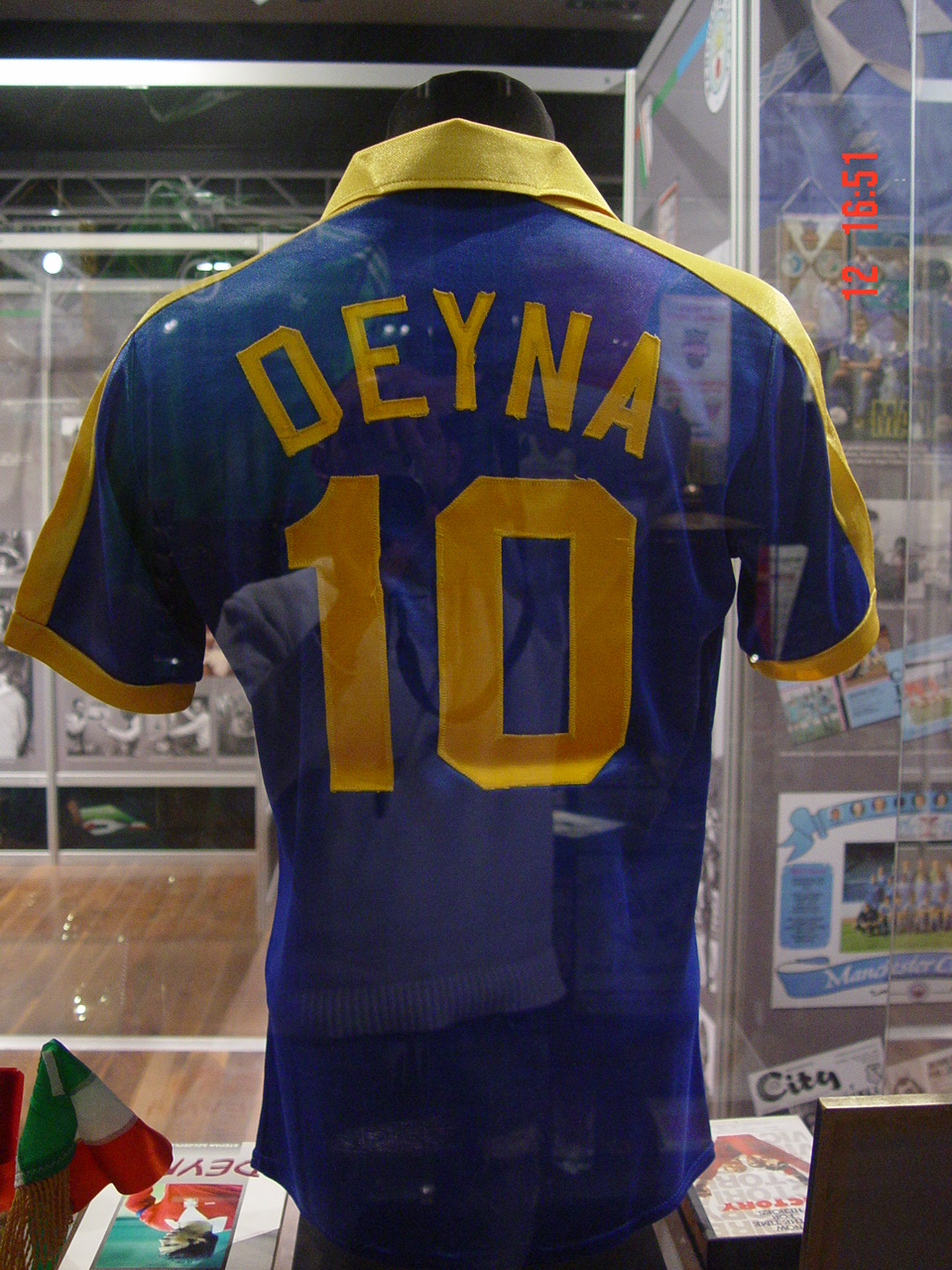
The jersey that Deyna wore during his run on San Diego Sockers

Deyna appeared in the 1981 film Escape to Victory as Paul Wolcheck. In the same year, he emigrated to the United States, where he signed with the San Diego Sockers of the North American Soccer League in January 1981. During the next seven years, he played four NASL outdoor seasons, one NASL indoor season and five Major Indoor Soccer League seasons with the Sockers, winning five championships. The Sockers released him in June 1987. He was a 1983 NASL Second Team All Star.

== International career ==
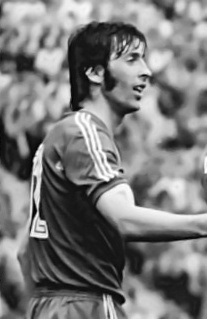
Deyna with Poland in 1974

On 24 April 1968, Deyna made his debut for the Poland national team in a match against Turkey in Chorzów. He won the gold medal in the 1972 Summer Olympics in Munich, and the bronze in Football World Cup 1974, after a match against Brazil. In 1972, he was also the Top Goalscorer of the Olympic Games, with a total of nine goals.

In 1976 Summer Olympics his team yet again reached the finals and won the silver medal. Additionally, he was ranked third in the European Footballer of the Year for 1974, behind Johan Cruyff and Franz Beckenbauer.

Deyna played for Poland on 97 (84 after the deduction of Olympic Football Tournament competition games) occasions, scoring 41 goals, and often captained the side. He had the ability to score from unusual positions, for example directly from a corner. Because of his achievements and talents, he was chosen Football Player of the Year several times by Polish fans. In 1978, he captained Poland at the Football World Cup in Argentina, where the team reached the second phase.

== Death ==
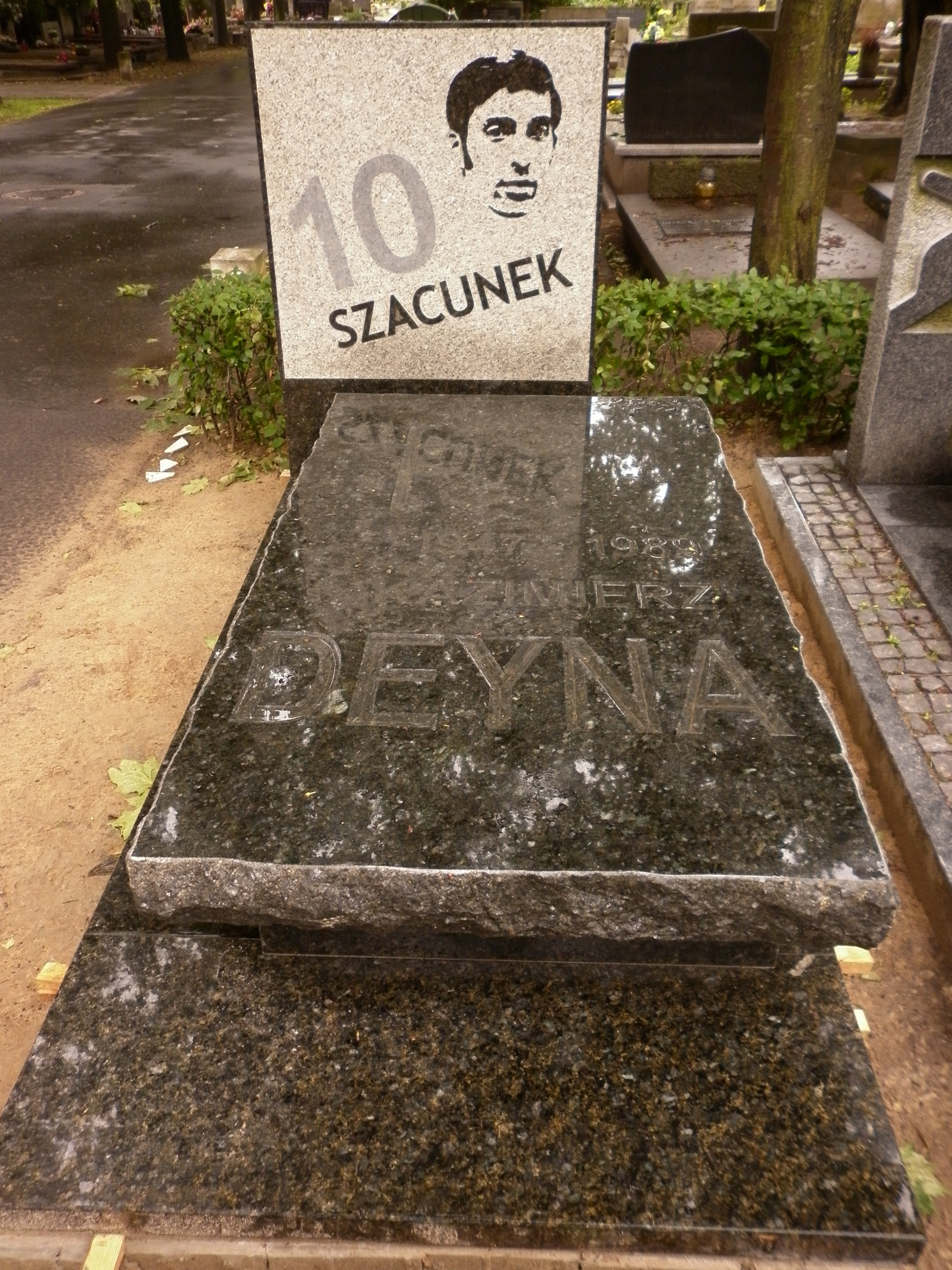
Kazimierz Deyna tomb in Powązki Military Cemetery

Deyna died in a car accident in San Diego, California on 1 September 1989, aged 41 (just two days before another fatal car accident claimed the life of another international football star, the Italian Gaetano Scirea). In 1994, he was chosen by the Polish Football Association (PZPN) and the readers of all Polish sports-related newspapers as the Greatest Polish Football Player of All Time. His number 10 is retired by Legia Warsaw and the Sockers. In June 2012 Kazimierz Deyna's remains were exhumed and reburied in Warsaw's Powązki Military Cemetery.

== Career statistics ==
=== Club ===
Appearances and goals by club, season and competition
Club	Season	League			Cup		League Cup		Continental		Total	
Club	Season	Division	Apps	Goals	Apps	Goals	Apps	Goals	Apps	Goals	Apps	Goals
ŁKS Łódź	1966–67	Ekstraklasa	1	0								
Legia Warsaw	1966–67	Ekstraklasa	12	6	1	1	–		0	0	13	7
Legia Warsaw	1967–68	Ekstraklasa	23	6	2	0	–		4	4	29	10
Legia Warsaw	1968–69	Ekstraklasa	26	12	6	5	–		6	2	38	19
Legia Warsaw	1969–70	Ekstraklasa	23	5	4	3	–		8	3	35	11
Legia Warsaw	1970–71	Ekstraklasa	23	3	4	4	–		6	1	33	8
Legia Warsaw	1971–72	Ekstraklasa	26	10	6	8	–		4	0	36	18
Legia Warsaw	1972–73	Ekstraklasa	25	8	7	4	–		3	3	35	15
Legia Warsaw	1973–74	Ekstraklasa	27	8	3	2	–		5	2	35	12
Legia Warsaw	1974–75	Ekstraklasa	26	5	0	0	–		2	0	28	5
Legia Warsaw	1975–76	Ekstraklasa	26	11	2	1	–				28	12
Legia Warsaw	1976–77	Ekstraklasa	28	9	4	0	–		2	2	34	11
Legia Warsaw	1977–78	Ekstraklasa	28	9	4	1	–				33	10
Legia Warsaw	1978–79	Ekstraklasa	11	2	2	1	–				13	3
Legia Warsaw	Total		304	93								
Manchester City	1978–79	First Division	13	6	2	0	1	0	1	1	17	7
Manchester City	1979–80	First Division	22	6	0	0	1	0			23	6
Manchester City	1980–81	First Division	3	0	0	0	0	0			3	0
Manchester City	Total		38	12								
San Diego Sockers	1981	North American Soccer League	39	15								
San Diego Sockers	1982	North American Soccer League	26	11								
San Diego Sockers	1983	North American Soccer League	18	15								
San Diego Sockers	1984	North American Soccer League	23	8								
San Diego Sockers	Total		106	49								
Career total			449	159							539	203

=== International ===
Appearances and goals by national team and year
National team	Year	Apps	Goals
Poland	1968	5	0
Poland	1969	8	7
Poland	1970	5	2
Poland	1971	5	1
Poland	1972	10	9
Poland	1973	14	1
Poland	1974	12	4
Poland	1975	8	6
Poland	1976	8	3
Poland	1977	12	4
Poland	1978	10	4
Total		97	41

Scores and results list Poland's goal tally first, score column indicates score after each Deyna goal.

List of international goals scored by Kazimierz Deyna
No.	Date	Venue	Opponent	Score	Result	Competition
1	20 April 1969	Kraków, Poland	Luxembourg	4–0	8–0	1970 FIFA World Cup qualification
2	20 April 1969	Kraków, Poland	Luxembourg	5–0	8–0	1970 FIFA World Cup qualification
3	15 June 1969	Sofia, Bulgaria	Bulgaria	1–2	1–4	1970 FIFA World Cup qualification
4	27 August 1969	Łódź, Poland	Norway	3–0	6–1	Friendly
5	12 October 1969	Luxembourg, Luxembourg	Luxembourg	1–1	5–1	1970 FIFA World Cup qualification
6	12 October 1969	Luxembourg, Luxembourg	Luxembourg	5–1	5–1	1970 FIFA World Cup qualification
7	9 November 1969	Warsaw, Poland	Bulgaria	3–0	3–0	1970 FIFA World Cup qualification
8	16 May 1970	Kraków, Poland	East Germany	1–0	1–1	Friendly
9	2 September 1970	Warsaw, Poland	Denmark	2–0	5–0	Friendly
10	5 May 1971	Lausanne, Switzerland	Switzerland	3–1	4–2	Friendly
11	30 August 1972	Regensburg, West Germany	Ghana	3–0	4–0	1972 Summer Olympics
12	3 September 1972	Regensburg, West Germany	Denmark	1–1	1–1	1972 Summer Olympics
13	5 September 1972	Augsburg, West Germany	Soviet Union	1–1	2–1	1972 Summer Olympics
14	8 September 1972	Nürnberg, West Germany	Morocco	3–0	5–0	1972 Summer Olympics
15	8 September 1972	Nürnberg, West Germany	Morocco	5–0	5–0	1972 Summer Olympics
16	10 September 1972	Munich, West Germany	Hungary	1–1	2–1	1972 Summer Olympics
17	10 September 1972	Munich, West Germany	Hungary	2–1	2–1	1972 Summer Olympics
18	15 October 1972	Bydgoszcz, Poland	Czechoslovakia	1–0	3–0	Friendly
19	15 October 1972	Bydgoszcz, Poland	Czechoslovakia	2–0	3–0	Friendly
20	10 October 1973	Rotterdam, Netherlands	Netherlands	1–1	1–1	Friendly
21	17 April 1974	Liège, Belgium	Belgium	1–1	1–1	Friendly
22	19 June 1974	Munich, West Germany	Haiti	2–0	7–0	1974 FIFA World Cup
23	23 June 1974	Stuttgart, West Germany	Italy	2–0	2–1	1974 FIFA World Cup
24	30 June 1974	Frankfurt, West Germany	Yugoslavia	1–0	2–1	1974 FIFA World Cup
25	26 March 1975	Poznań, Poland	United States	3–0	7–0	Friendly
26	26 March 1975	Poznań, Poland	United States	6–0	7–0	Friendly
27	26 March 1975	Poznań, Poland	United States	7–0	7–0	Friendly
28	6 July 1975	Montreal, Canada	Canada	3–0	8–1	Friendly
29	6 July 1975	Montreal, Canada	Canada	6–1	8–1	Friendly
30	9 July 1975	Toronto, Canada	Canada	4–1	4–1	Friendly
31	22 July 1976	Montreal, Canada	Iran	2–1	3–2	1976 Summer Olympics
32	31 October 1976	Warsaw, Poland	Cyprus	1–0	5–0	1978 FIFA World Cup qualification
33	31 October 1976	Warsaw, Poland	Cyprus	3–0	5–0	1978 FIFA World Cup qualification
34	10 July 1977	Lima, Peru	Peru	2–0	3–1	Friendly
35	21 September 1977	Chorzów, Poland	Denmark	3–0	4–1	1978 FIFA World Cup qualification
36	29 October 1977	Chorzów, Poland	Portugal	1–0	1–1	1978 FIFA World Cup qualification
37	12 November 1977	Wrocław, Poland	Sweden	2–1	2–1	Friendly
38	5 April 1978	Poznań, Poland	Greece	2–0	5–2	Friendly
39	5 April 1978	Poznań, Poland	Greece	4–0	5–2	Friendly
40	12 April 1978	Łódź, Poland	Republic of Ireland	2–0	3–0	Friendly
41	10 June 1978	Rosario, Argentina	Mexico	2–1	3–1	1978 FIFA World Cup

== Honours ==
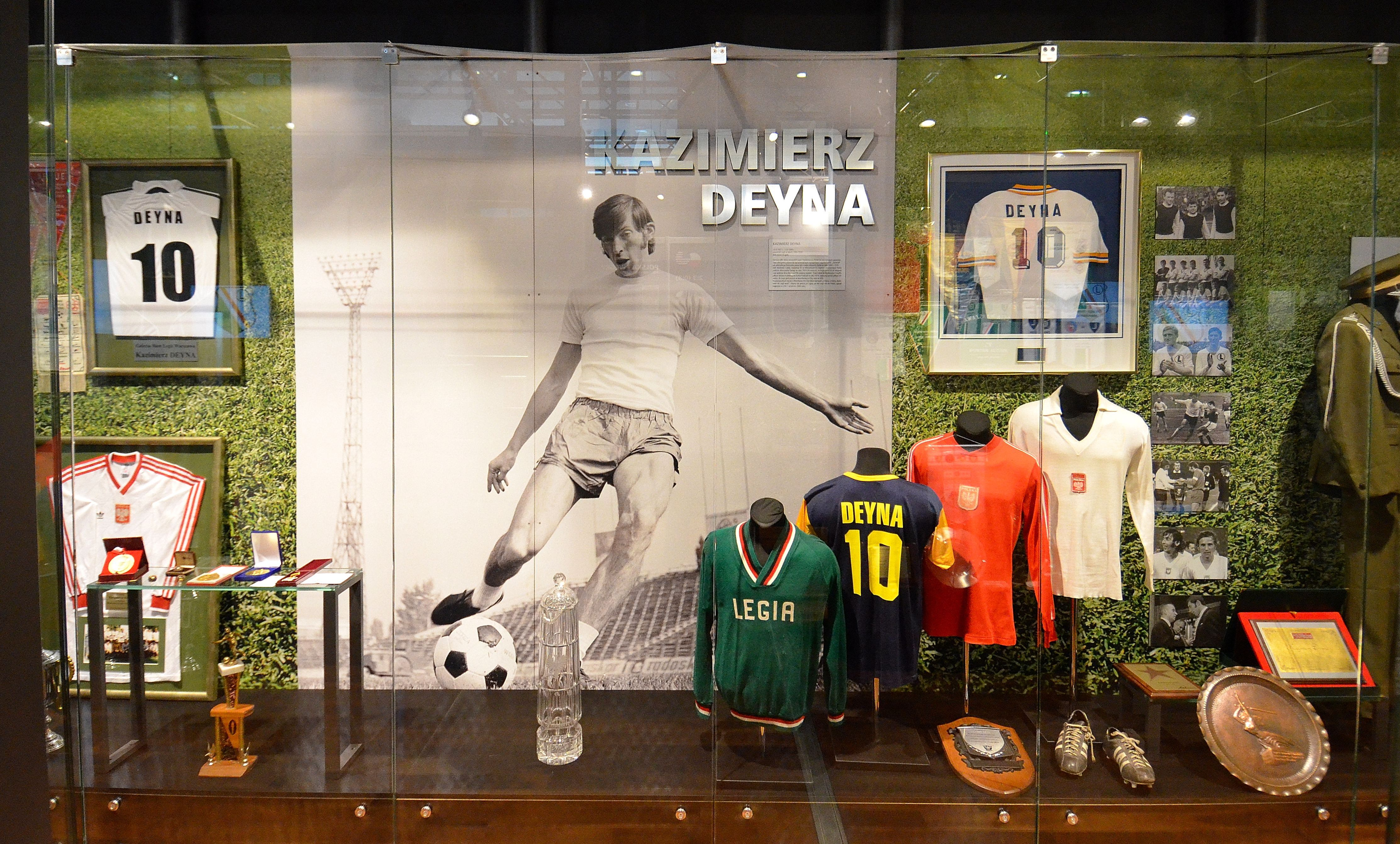
Exhibition dedicated to Kazimierz Deyna at Legia Warsaw Museum

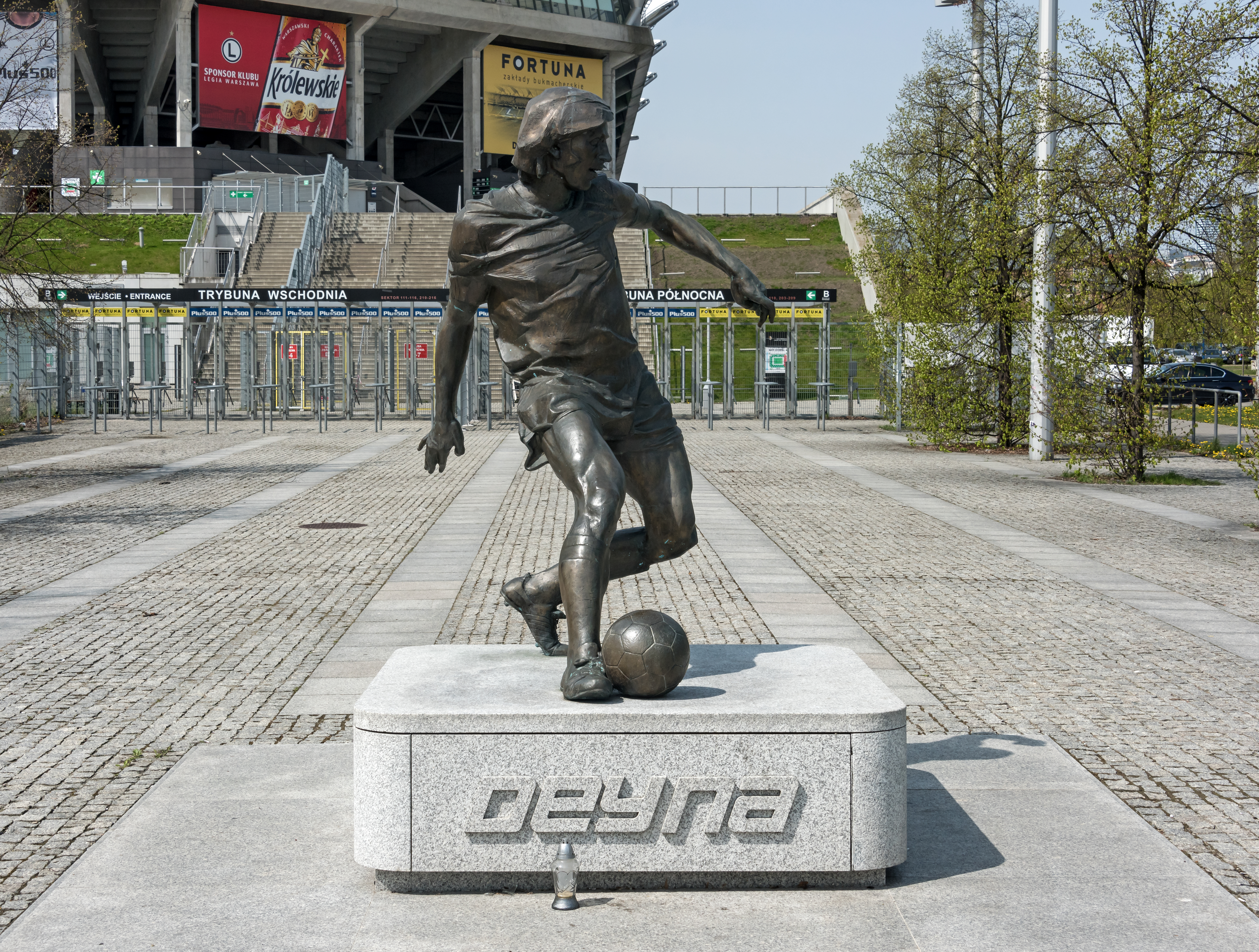
Deyna's statue on Łazienkowska Street in Warsaw

Legia Warsaw

- Ekstraklasa: 1968–69, 1969–70
- Polish Cup: 1972–73

Poland

- Olympic Games: 1972
- FIFA World Cup third place: 1974

Individual

- Olympic top scorer: 1972
- FUWO European Team of the Season: 1972
- Sport Ideal European XI: 1972, 1973
- Piłka Nożna Polish Footballer of the Year: 1973, 1974
- ADN Eastern European Footballer of the Season: 1973, 1974
- Ballon d'Or third place: 1974;
- FIFA World Cup All-Star Team: 1974
- World XI: 1974
- Polish Football Association National Team of the Century: 1919–2019

National

- Gold Cross of Merit: 1972
- Knight's Cross of the Order of Polonia Restituta: 1974
- Polish Olympic Committee Gold Medal: 2012 (posthumously)
