= Gert Wieczorkowski =

German footballer (born 1948)

Personal information
- Date of birth: 24 July 1948
- Place of birth: Hamburg, Germany
- Date of death: 10 January 2021 (aged 72)
- Place of death: Hamburg, Germany
- Height: 1.80 m (5 ft 11 in)
- Positions: Defender; midfielder

Senior career*
Years	Team	Apps	(Gls)
1971–1974	FC St. Pauli		
1974–1979	Rot-Weiss Essen	140	(12)
1979–1983	San Diego Sockers	124	(8)
1979–1980	UNAM Pumas		
1980–1982	San Diego Sockers (NASL indoor)	35	(19)
1982–1983	San Diego Sockers (MISL indoor)	48	(10)
1983–1984	San Diego Sockers (NASL indoor)	28	(4)
1984–1985	San Diego Sockers (MISL indoor)	48	(4)
- * Club domestic league appearances and goals

Gert Wieczorkowski (24 July 1948 – 10 January 2021) was a German professional footballer who played in Germany and the United States including the North American Soccer League and Major Indoor Soccer League.

In 1971, Wieczorkowski joined FC St. Pauli in the second division Regionalliga Nord. In 1974, he moved to Rot-Weiss Essen, which was playing in the Bundesliga at the time. In 1979, Wieczorkowski moved to the United States and signed with the San Diego Sockers of the North American Soccer League. Over the next six years, Wieczorkowski played five summer outdoor seasons, three NASL indoor seasons and three seasons in the Major Indoor Soccer League with the Sockers. He won four championships, all indoors, with the Sockers. Wieczorkowski also played for UNAM Pumas in Mexico in 1979 to 1980.
