= Namdar, Kermanshah =

Namdar نامدار
- Village
- Location within Iran
- Coordinates: 33°54′37″N 47°18′35″E
- Country: Iran
- Province: Kermanshah
- County: Kermanshah
- Bakhsh: Firuzabad
- Rural District: Osmanvand

Population (2006)
  - Total: 16
- Time zone: UTC+3:30 (IRST)
  - Summer (DST): UTC+4:30 (IRDT)

Namdar (Persian: نامدار, also Romanized as Nāmdār; also known as Sūreh Darreh) is a village in Osmanvand Rural District, Firuzabad District, Kermanshah County, Kermanshah Province, Iran. At the 2006 census, its population was 16, in 4 families.
