= San Diego Sockers (1978–1996) =

Defunct American soccer club

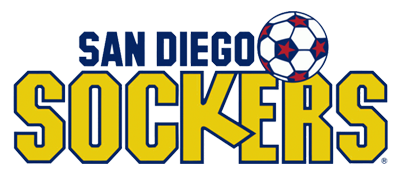
- Full name: San Diego Sockers
- Nickname: Sockers
- Founded: 1978
- Dissolved: 1996; 30 years ago
- Stadium: Jack Murphy Stadium (48,460) (1978–84); San Diego Sports Arena (12,920) (1980–96)
- Manager: Ron Newman
- League: NASL (1978–84); MISL/MSL (1982–83, 1984–92); CISL (1993–96)
Home colours	Away colours

The San Diego Sockers were a professional soccer and indoor soccer team based in San Diego, California. The team played in the indoor and outdoor editions of the North American Soccer League (NASL) until 1984 as well as the original Major Indoor Soccer League (MISL) and the Continental Indoor Soccer League (CISL). The franchise folded in 1996 and was the last surviving NASL franchise.

The Sockers are considered the most successful indoor soccer team. They made the playoffs in all but one of their 16 seasons of playing indoors.

== History ==
The team began as the "Baltimore Comets" in 1974 but moved to San Diego as the "San Diego Jaws" in 1976. After a one-year stay in Las Vegas as the "Las Vegas Quicksilvers", the team returned as the San Diego Sockers in 1978. They were owned by Bob Bell and played their indoor games at the San Diego Sports Arena.

Initially, victories came slowly for the club but mounted quickly and they experienced moderate success over their outdoor history winning several division titles. However, the San Diego Sockers won the North American Soccer League (NASL) Indoor Championships of 1981–82 and 1983–84. Success was far from over for the San Diego Sockers. When the NASL folded, the San Diego Sockers moved to the Major Indoor Soccer League and won eight championships: 1983, 1985, 1986, 1988, 1989, 1990, 1991, and 1992. The Sockers carried their success from one league to the next. They switched to the Continental Indoor Soccer League for three more years from 1993 to 1995. However, after several ownership changes, Sockers folded after the 1996 season.

There have been two subsequent revivals of the Sockers. The first was a franchise in the WISL that later joined the second MISL before folding in 2004. A second started play in the PASL-PRO in 2009.

=== Leagues ===
- NASL 1974–1984
- NASL indoor 1980–1982, 1983–1984
- MISL/MSL 1982–1983, 1984–1992
- CISL 1993–1996

=== Owners ===
- Co-Owners included Charles T. Koval, Joe Sadowski, Ed Lewis, Bob Bell (1977–78)
- Co-Owners Charles T. Koval, Bob Bell (1978–81)
- Bob Bell (1981–87)
- Ron Fowler (1987–91)
- Oscar Ancira, Sr. (1991–94)
- San Diego Sports Arena Management (1994–96)

=== Head coaches ===
- (Germany) Hubert Vogelsinger (1978–1980)
- (England) Ron Newman (1980–1994)
- (United States) (Northern Ireland) Brian Quinn (1994–1996)

== Year-by-year ==
=== Outdoor ===
Year	Reg. season	Playoffs	Notes	Attendance
1974	2nd East, 10–8–2	Lost Quarterfinal	operated as the Baltimore Comets	4,139
1975	5th East, 9–13	Did not qualify	operated as the Baltimore Comets	2,641
1976	5th South, 9–15	Did not qualify	operated as the San Diego Jaws	6,152
1977	5th South. 11–15	Did not qualify	operated as the Las Vegas Quicksilvers	7,079
1978	1st American Conference West, 18–12	Lost Conference Semifinal	first season as the San Diego Sockers	5,146
1979	2nd American Conference West, 15–15	Lost Conference Final		11,271
1980	3rd American Conference West, 16–16	Lost Conference Final		12,753
1981	1st West, 21–11	Lost Conference Final		14,802
1982	2nd West, 19–13	Lost League Semifinal		8,532
1983	4th West, 11–19	Did not qualify		4,685
1984	1st West, 14–10	Lost Semifinal	last outdoor season	5,702

=== Indoor ===
Year	League	Reg. season	Playoffs	Attendance
1976	NASL	3rd West Regional, 0–2	Out of playoffs	6,055
1978	NASL	3rd, 1–1	N/A	N/A
1980–81	NASL	4th South, 6–12	Out of playoffs	4,912
1981–82	NASL	1st West, 10–8	Won Championship	7,047
1982–83	MISL	1st West, 32–16	Won Championship	8,081
1983–84	NASL	1st NASL, 21–11	Won Championship	11,415
1984–85	MISL	1st West, 37–11	Won Championship	9,595
1985–86	MISL	1st West, 36–12	Won Championship	9,581
1986–87	MISL	3rd West, 27–25	Lost Semifinal	9,748
1987–88	MISL	1st West, 42–14	Won Championship	8,996
1988–89	MISL	2nd MISL, 27–21	Won Championship	8,383
1989–90	MISL	2nd West, 25–27	Won Championship	8,131
1990–91	MSL	1st West, 34–18	Won Championship	7,231
1991–92	MSL	1st MSL, 26–14	Won Championship	9,348
1993	CISL	2nd CISL, 20–8	Runners-up	5,583
1994	CISL	2nd West, 18–10	Lost Quarterfinal	5,032
1995	CISL	3rd South, 17–11	Lost Quarterfinal	5,366
1996	CISL	1st West, 17–11	Lost Semifinal	4,830

== Honors ==
Championships (10)

- NASL indoor: 1981–82, 1983–84
- MISL: 1982–83, 1984–85, 1985–86, 1987–88, 1988–89, 1989–90, 1990–91, 1991–92
- CISL: 1993 (runners-up)

Regular Season/ Division Titles (12)

- NASL: 1978, 1981, 1984
- NASL indoor: 1981–82, 1983–84
- MISL: 1982–83, 1984–85, 1985–86, 1987–88, 1990–91, 1991–92
- CISL: 1996

Conference Titles

- NASL indoor: 1981–82 (Pacific)

NASL Coach of the Year

- 1984 Ron Newman

NASL North American Player of the Year

- 1981 Mike Stojanović

NASL All Stars

- 1978 Alan Mayer -Second Team
- 1979 Alan Mayer -Honorable Mention
- 1979 Bobby Smith -Honorable Mention
- 1981 Volkmar Gross -Honorable Mention
- 1981 Mike Stojanović -Honorable Mention
- 1981 Juli Veee -Honorable Mention
- 1982 Juli Veee -Honorable Mention
- 1983 Kaz Deyna -Second Team
- 1984 Kevin Crow -First Team
- 1984 Kaz Deyna -Honorable Mention
- 1984 Brian Quinn -Honorable Mention

NASL indoor MVP

- 1981–82 Juli Veee

NASL indoor Scoring Champion

- 1978 Peter Anderson
- 1981–82 Juli Veee

NASL indoor Goalkeeper of the Year

- 1983–84 Jim Gorsek

NASL indoor Championship Finals MVP

- 1981–82 Juli Veee
- 1983–84 Jean Willrich

NASL indoor All Stars

- 1980–81 Julie Veee
- 1981–82 Julie Veee
- 1981–82 Martin Donnelly
- 1981–82 Volkmar Gross
- 1983–84 Kaz Deyna, Gert Wieczorkowski
- 1983–84 (2nd team) Juli Veee, Martin Donnelly
- 1984 Alan Mayer -All-Star Game starter
- 1984 Julie Veee -All-Star Game starter
- 1984 Kaz Deyna -All-Star Game starter
- 1984 Jean Willrich -All-Star Game reserve
- 1984 Gert Wieczorkowski -All-Star Game reserve

Hall of Fame members

- United States: Fernando Clavijo, Ron Newman, Hugo Pérez, Bobby Smith, Alan Willey, Steve Zungul
- Canada: Bob Iarusci, Terry Moore, Branko Šegota, Mike Stojanović
- Indoor Soccer: Fernando Clavijo, Kevin Crow, Zoran Karić, Alan Mayer, Ron Newman, Victor Nogueira, Brian Quinn, Branko Šegota, Zoltán Tóth, Julie Veee, Steve Zungul
MISL MVP
- 1983 Alan Mayer
- 1985 Steve Zungul
- 1986 Steve Zungul
- 1991 Victor Nogueira
- 1992 Victor Nogueira

MISL Championship MVP

- 1983 Juli Veee
- 1985 Steve Zungul
- 1986 Brian Quinn
- 1988 Hugo Pérez
- 1989 Victor Nogueira
- 1990 Brian Quinn
- 1991 Ben Collins
- 1992 Thompson Usiyan

MISL Scoring Champion

- 1985 Steve Zungul
- 1986 Steve Zungul

MISL Pass Master (Assists leader)

- 1985 Steve Zungul
- 1986 Steve Zungul

MISL Defender of the Year

- 1985 Kevin Crow
- 1988 Kevin Crow
- 1989 Kevin Crow
- 1991 Kevin Crow
- 1992 Kevin Crow

MISL Goalkeeper of the Year

- 1988 Zoltán Tóth
- 1989 Victor Nogueira
- 1991 Victor Nogueira
- 1992 Victor Nogueira

MISL Coach of the Year

- 1988 Ron Newman

MISL Rookie of the Year

- 1991 David Banks

MISL First Team All Star

- 1983 Alan Mayer, Kazimierz Deyna
- 1985 Branko Šegota, Kevin Crow, Steve Zungul
- 1986 Fernando Clavijo, Branko Segota
- 1987 Kevin Crow
- 1988 Zoltán Tóth, Fernando Clavijo, Kevin Crow, Branko Segota
- 1990 Victor Nogueira, Kevin Crow
- 1991 Victor Nogueira, Kevin Crow

CISL Goalkeeper of the Year

- 1994 Antonio Cortes

CISL Rookie of the Year

- 1994 John Olu–Molomo
- 1995 Mark Chung
- 1996 Carlos Farias

CISL First Team All Star

- 1993 David Banks
- 1995 Mark Chung

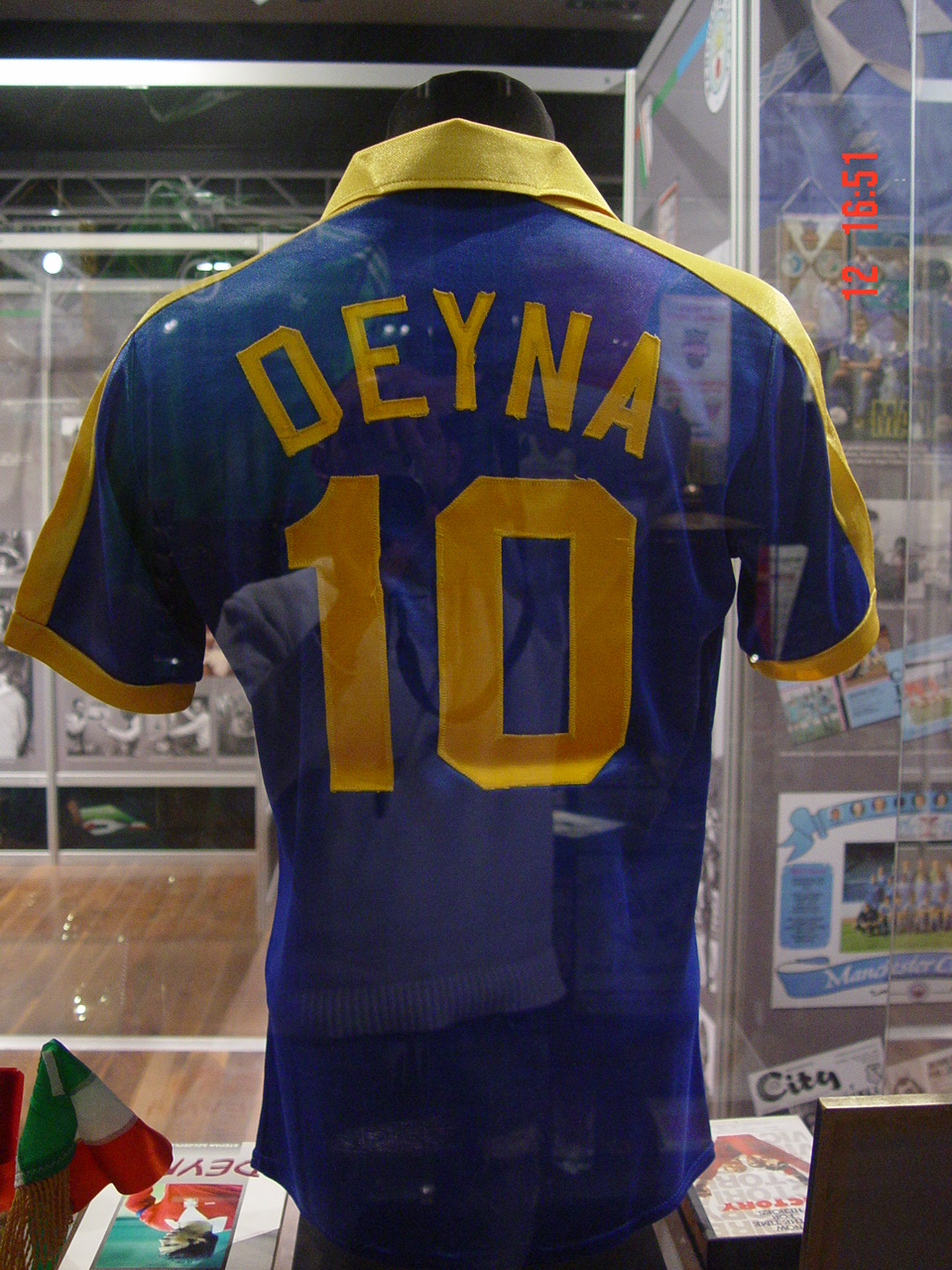
Jersey worn by Polish star Kazimierz Deyna during his run on team

== Sources ==
- [when accessed on February 15, 2020, this link was no longer active]
