= Cha Cha Namdar =

Iranian-American soccer player and coach

Personal information
- Full name: Asghar Shadin Namdar
- Date of birth: July 15, 1956 (age 70)
- Place of birth: Tehran, Iran
- Positions: Forward; midfielder

Youth career
- 1976–1979: Texas Tech Red Raiders

Senior career*
Years	Team	Apps	(Gls)
1980–1982	Phoenix Inferno (indoor)	74	(27)
1982–1983	San Diego Sockers (indoor)	46	(15)
1983–1984	San Diego Sockers	2	(0)
1984–1987	San Diego Sockers (indoor)	137	(21)
1987–1989	Los Angeles Lazers (indoor)	95	(16)
1991	Wichita Wings (indoor)	8	(2)
1993–1994	San Diego Sockers (indoor)		
- * Club domestic league appearances and goals

Asghar Shadin "Cha Cha" Namdar is a retired Iranian-American soccer player who spent time in the Major Indoor Soccer League, North American Soccer League and Continental Indoor Soccer League.

Namdar grew up in Tehran, where he played for the Iranian youth soccer team. He attended college and played soccer at Texas Tech University. During his college years, he tended bar in Chicago where a waitress named him "Cha Cha". In 1980, Namdar walked into an open Phoenix Inferno tryout and received a contract from the Major Indoor Soccer League club. He played for the Inferno for two seasons before being released in 1982. He then attended an open tryout with the San Diego Sockers as it prepared for the 1982–1983 MISL season. He again received a contract and would spend two years with the Sockers. At the time, the Sockers also played during the summer in the North American Soccer League and Namdar saw time in two NASL games in 1984 before losing the remainder of the season with a knee injury. Sockers returned to the MISL after playing in the NASL indoor season in 1984–1984. Namdar remained with the Sockers, winning several championships, until he was waived in October 1987. He signed three weeks later with the Los Angeles Lazers. The Lazers folded in 1989 and on July 11, 1989, the St. Louis Storm selected Namdar in the second round of the dispersal draft. The Storm released Namdar during the pre-season and he returned to San Diego where he played in the amateur San Diego Premier Soccer League. In March 1991, Namdar signed with the Wichita Wings. In 1993, Namdar returned to the Sockers which was now playing in the Continental Indoor Soccer League. He finished his career with the Sockers in 1994. His daughter, Jasmine Namdar, played soccer at the University of Arizona and with the San Diego WFC SeaLions.
