= Namdar, Lorestan =

Namdar نامدار
- Village
- Location within Iran
- Coordinates: 33°53′28″N 48°11′56″E
- Country: Iran
- Province: Lorestan
- County: Selseleh
- Bakhsh: Central
- Rural District: Yusefvand

Population (2006)
  - Total: 58
- Time zone: UTC+3:30 (IRST)
  - Summer (DST): UTC+4:30 (IRDT)

Namdar (Persian: نامدار, also Romanized as Nāmdār; also known as Nāmdārābād) is a village in Yusefvand Rural District, in the Central District of Selseleh County, Lorestan Province, Iran. As of the 2006 census, its population was 58, in 14 families.
