= Limbdi State =

Former monarchy

Coordinates: 22°34′N 71°53′E

Limbdi State લીંબડી રિયાસત
- c. 1500–1947
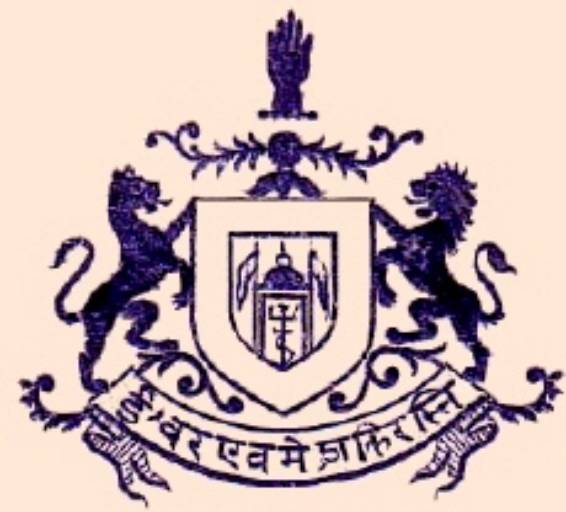
- Coat of arms

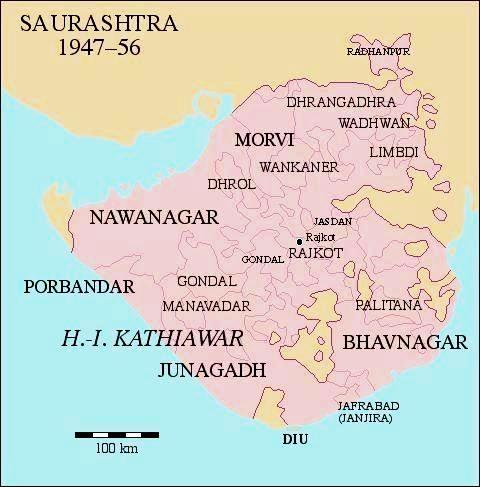
- Location of Limbdi State in Saurashtra
- History
  - Established: c. 1500
  - Accession to the Union of India: 1947

Area
- 1931: 632 km^{2} (244 sq mi)
- 1943: 1,533.5 km^{2} (592.1 sq mi)

Population
  - 1931: 40,688
  - 1943: 80,000
Preceded by	Succeeded by
Kingdom of Jhalavad	India

Limbdi State was a princely state ruled by Jhala clan of Rajputs, which was entitled to a 9-gun salute during the British Raj under the Kathiawar Agency. After India's independence from British colonial rule in 1947, Limbdi was integrated into the Union of India with other princely states.

Limbdi State ruled by Jhala Rajputs, is not to be confused with the other similarly named Limbda princely state ruled by Gohil Rajputs. Present day Limbdi town is 100 north of Limbda town.

== History ==
During local princely states existence in Kathiyawad, there were approximately 222 small & medium princely states. During that era, Limbdi was also a princely state. During the time span from 1768 to 1948, many rulers had taken charge of Limbdi starting from Harisinhji, Bhojrajji, Harbhamji, Fatesinhji, Jashwantsinhji, Jatashankar.

== Rulers ==
The rulers of Limbdi had the feudal title of Thakur Sahib. They also held the title of Maharana, which was rarely used.

- 16.. – 17.. Verisalji I Aderajj
- 17.. – 17.. Askaranji III Verisalji
- 17.. – 17.. Aderajji II Askaranji
- 17.. – 17.. Verisalji II Aderajji
- 17.. – 1786 Harbhanji I Verisalji (d. 1786)
- 1786 – 1825 Harisinhji Harbhanj (d. 1825)
- 1825 – 1837 Bhojraji Harisinhji (d. 1837)
- 1837 – 8 Jan 1856 Harbhamji II Bhojraji (d. 1856)
- 8 Jan 1856 – 30 Jan 1862 Fatehsinhji Bhojraji (d. 1862)
- 30 Jan 1862 – 26 Apr 1907 Jashwantsinhji Fatehsinhji (b. 1859 – d. 1907) (from 30 Jun 1887, Sir Jashwantsinhji Fatehsinhji)
- 30 Jan 1862 – 1 Aug 1877 Rani Shri Hariba Kunverba - Sahiba (f) -Regent
- 26 Apr 1907 – 30 Sep 1940 Daulatsinhji Jashwantsinhji (b. 1868 – d. 1940) (from 1 Jan 1921, Sir Daulatsinhji Jashwantsinhji)
- 30 Sep 1940 – 6 Jan 1941 Digvijaysinhji Daulatsinhji (b. 1896 – d. 1941)
- 6 Jan 1941 – 15 Aug 1947 Chhatarsalji Digvijaysinhji (b. 1940 – d. 2020)

== See also ==
- Lists of princely states of India
