= Namdar-e Bala =

Namdar-e Bala نامدر بالا
- Village
- Location within Iran
- Coordinates: 27°50′53″N 56°35′28″E
- Country: Iran
- Province: Hormozgan
- County: Bandar Abbas
- Bakhsh: Fin
- Rural District: Siyahu

Population (2006)
  - Total: 120
- Time zone: UTC+3:30 (IRST)
  - Summer (DST): UTC+4:30 (IRDT)

Namdar-e Bala (Persian: نامدر بالا, also Romanized as Nāmdar-e Bālā; also known as Nāndar-e Bālā) is a village in Siyahu Rural District, Fin District, Bandar Abbas County, Hormozgan Province, Iran. At the 2006 census, its population was 120, in 33 families.
