= Alan Mayer =

American soccer player (born 1952)

Personal information
- Full name: Alan Mayer
- Date of birth: July 3, 1952 (age 74)
- Place of birth: Islip, New York, U.S.
- Position: Goalkeeper

College career
Years	Team	Apps	(Gls)
1970–1973	James Madison Dukes		

Senior career*
Years	Team	Apps	(Gls)
1974	Southend United	9	(1)
1974–1975	Baltimore Comets	27	(0)
1976	San Diego Jaws	23	(0)
1977	Las Vegas Quicksilvers	22	(0)
1978–1979	San Diego Sockers	51	(0)
1979–1980	Pittsburgh Spirit (indoor)	17	(0)
1980	California Surf	17	(0)
1980–1981	New Jersey Rockets (indoor)	27	(0)
1981	California Surf	26	(0)
1981–1982	New Jersey Rockets (indoor)	27	(0)
1982–1983	San Diego Sockers (indoor)	43	(0)
1984–1985	Las Vegas Americans (indoor)	30	(0)
1985–1989	Kansas City Comets (indoor)	112	(0)
Total		422	(0)

International career
1976–1977	United States	6	(0)

Managerial career
- 1984–1985: Las Vegas Americans
- Kansas City Wizards (assistant)
- 2010–: Kansas City Comets (assistant/goalkeeping)
- 2013–2017: Kansas City Roos (goalkeeping)
- 2018: Kansas City Roos (director of soccer ops)
- 2019: Kansas City Roos (assistant/goalkeeping)
- * Club domestic league appearances and goals

Alan Mayer (born July 3, 1952) is an American retired soccer goalkeeper. He played professionally in the North American Soccer League and Major Indoor Soccer League and earned six caps with the United States men's national soccer team.

In 2019 he was inducted into the Indoor Soccer Hall of Fame and Islip High School Hall of Fame. In 2021 he was inducted into Long Island Soccer Player Hall of Fame.

== Youth ==
Attended Islip High School in New York where Mayer was named All-Suffolk County in three sports (Soccer, Basketball, and Tennis). He, along with his brother, Bill, were New York State Tennis Doubles Champions. Inducted into the Suffolk County Hall of Fame in 2002 and in 2021 was inducted into the Long Island Soccer Player Hall of Fame. After graduating from Islip High School, Mayer attended James Madison University (JMU) where he played collegiate soccer and tennis for four seasons. He was the JMU soccer team MVP all four years while setting school records for career and season shutouts and also being named the first All-American player from JMU. Mayer was the JMU's tennis team MVP for three years as he played #1 singles and #1 doubles and was named JMU Athlete of the Year twice. He was selected to the James Madison University first Hall of Fame class in 1988. In 2000, he was voted JMU's Top Athlete of the Century. In 2021, he was inducted into the Long Island Soccer Player Hall of Fame.

== Professional ==
After graduating in 1974, he was drafted first by the Baltimore Comets of the North American Soccer League (NASL). In the 1974 off-season, while playing in England for Southend United, then in the Football League Third Division, Mayer earned the distinction of scoring a goal from the goalkeeper position. In 1976, the Comets moved to San Diego and renamed their franchise, the Jaws. The team moved again in 1977 after only one season in San Diego, this time to Las Vegas, becoming the Quicksilvers. That year, Mayer earned NASL Second Team All Star honors. In 1978, the team moved again, back to San Diego where they took the name Sockers. Mayer remained with the team through all these moves and was named the 1978 NASL American Player of the Year.

Beginning in 1979, Mayer alternated between indoor and outdoor soccer for several years. While on contract with the Sockers for the outdoor season, he joined the Pittsburgh Spirit of the original Major Indoor Soccer League (MISL) for the 1979-1980 MISL season. He was selected as second-team All MISL with the Spirit. In 1980, the Sockers traded Mayer to the California Surf. He played two seasons with the Surf. Between the 1980 and 1981 outdoor seasons, Mayer also played with the New Jersey Rockets of the MISL. When the Surf folded after the 1981 season, Mayer concentrated on playing indoor soccer for the remainder of his career.

He returned to the Rockets for the 1981–1982 season before moving back to the San Diego Sockers which, while still officially part of the NASL, was playing in the MISL during the indoor season. While the Sockers had been a poor outdoor team, they quickly became the dominant U.S. indoor franchise, winning the MISL 1982-1983 championship. Mayer was named the MISL MVP and was the MISL All Star team goalkeeper that year as well. Mayer had a short tenure as player/head coach of the MISL's Las Vegas Americans in 1984–85, but was relieved of his coaching duties just ten games into the season (after going 4–6) and was replaced by Don Popovic. Mayer remained with the Americans strictly as a goalie and went 17-12 while splitting time with Keith Van Eron.

After the Americans' franchise folded the following summer, Mayer signed with the Kansas City Comets for the 1985–86 season and became an MISL All-Star for the second time. Nicknamed "Kamikaze" for his reckless all-out style of play, he became a fan favorite throughout his time in Kansas City, spending his final four seasons as a Comet before retiring at the end of the 1988–89 season. Mayer played his last game on April 12, 1989, against the Wichita Wings, and he finished with a regular-season won-lost record of 56–56 in Kansas City. In 2013, the Comets retired his jersey and it is now displayed hanging in the Silverstein Eye Centers Arena.

== National team ==
He earned 6 caps, gaining 2 shutouts, with the United States men's national soccer team from 1976 and 1977. During that period, he and Arnie Mausser traded duties as the starting goalkeeper on the national team.

During his career, he was known for wearing a padded helmet, not common in soccer at the time.

== Coach ==
After retiring from playing, Mayer was an assistant coach to the Kansas City Wizards of Major League Soccer. He currently lives in Kansas City and is goalkeeping coach of the Sporting KC Academy (MLS), University of Missouri at Kansas City (UMKC) and the Kansas City Comets in the Major Arena Soccer League. The team honored Mayer at halftime of their game on February 22, 2013, by retiring his #0 jersey from his tenure with the original Major Indoor Soccer League Kansas City Comets.

Mayer was inducted into the Suffolk Sports Hall of Fame on Long Island in the Soccer Category with the Class of 2002.
