= Las Vegas Americans =

The Las Vegas Americans were a soccer team based out of Las Vegas that played in the original Major Indoor Soccer League. Prior to Las Vegas, the team had operated as the Memphis Americans. They only played in Las Vegas during the 1984–85 season and lost in the first round of the playoffs that year. The Las Vegas Americans finished their only season in the league with a 30–18 record earning them second place in the Western Division of the league. Their home arena was Thomas & Mack Center, and their average attendance was 6,337.

The Americans were expelled from the Major Indoor Soccer League on July 17, 1985 when the board of directors voted to terminate the franchise due to financial troubles.

== Coaches ==
- (United States) Alan Mayer 14 Games in charge
- (United States) Don Popovic 38 Games in charge
