= Namdar (surname) =

Namdar (Persian: نامدار) is an Iranian surname. Notable people with the surname include:

- Cha Cha Namdar, Iranian-American soccer player
- Jafar Namdar (1934–2014), Iranian football referee
- Masud ibn Namdar, Kurdish-language writer
- Bijan Namdar Zangeneh, Iranian politician
