= San Diego Jaws =

Defunct American soccer club

- Full name: San Diego Jaws
- Founded: 1976
- Dissolved: 1976 (moved)
- Stadium: Aztec Bowl, San Diego, California
- League: North American Soccer League
Home colors	Away colors

The San Diego Jaws were a professional soccer team based in San Diego, California, that competed in the North American Soccer League (NASL). The team played its games at Aztec Bowl on the campus of San Diego State University. Founded in 1976, the team was the league's second attempt to place a franchise in San Diego with the Toros having folded in 1968 after two seasons. The franchise lasted only one season and relocated to Las Vegas for the 1977 NASL season.

== History ==
Founded as the in 1973 as the Baltimore Comets the bankrupt franchise was sold after two unsuccessful seasons on the East Coast and moved by new owner Ken Keegan to San Diego. It January 1976, it was announced the team had been renamed "Jaws". The team hired English midfielder Derek Trevis who had won the NASL championship in 1973 as part of the Philadelphia Atoms to acts as player-manager of the new franchise. Former Chapman College baseball coach Paul Deese, who claimed to have only seen two soccer games in his life, was hired as General Manager. Even though the team still had five open roster spots, include two of three forwards, the Jaws faced their first opponent the Dallas Tornados in a preseason game on March 12, 1976, losing 2-0 in front of a mostly unpaid crowd of 6,754. A week later, the team competed in the 1976 NASL Indoor tournament in Daly City, California, losing both games in which they participated. In another preseason game on March 24, 1976, this one held at Balboa Stadium, in front of 18,128 people in attendance the Jaws tied the New York Cosmos holding Pelé scoreless in the 1-1 draw.

San Diego began the outdoor season with a 1–0 win in overtime against the San Antonio Thunder with 5,200 fans in attendance. Later that month, the team hosted the Mexican Olympic team at Southwestern College in Chula Vista, California, losing 2-1 with Hugo Sánchez scoring both of Mexico's goals. It was reported that team owner Ken Keegan was seeking investors from the local community, with five limited partners added to the ownership group by mid July. The Jaws ended the season at home losing to the Minnesota Kicks 1-0 before 9,400 fans after two overtime periods. The Jaws finished the season with a record of 9 wins and 15 losses, last place in the Pacific Conference Southern Division. For the season, the team averaged over 6,000 fans at each home game, but it was reported the average paid attendance was only about 2,500. After weeks of speculation, on October 19, 1976, it was reported the team would be moving to Las Vegas.

The Jaws had no television coverage but did broadcast all matches on KSDO radio.

After one season in Las Vegas, the franchise was sold and returned to San Diego as the San Diego Sockers.

== Year-by-year ==
Year	League	W	L	T	Pts	Reg. season	Playoffs
1976	NASL indoor	0	2	—	0	3rd, West Regional	did not qualify
1976	NASL	9	15	—	82	5th, Pacific Conference, Southern Division	did not qualify

== Honors ==
Indoor All-Stars

- 1976: Archie Roboostoff (West All-Regional Team)

Indoor Soccer Hall of Fame members

- 2019: Alan Mayer
