= Baltimore Comets =

Defunct American soccer club

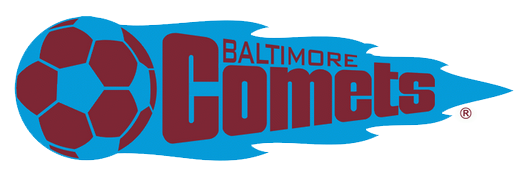
- Full name: Baltimore Comets
- Founded: 1974
- Dissolved: 1975 (moved)
- Stadium: Memorial Stadium, 1974–75; Burdick Field, 1975
- Capacity: 47,855 (1974–75); 6,000 (1975)
- Chairman: Lou Foreaker
- Coach: Doug Millward
- League: North American Soccer League
Home colors	Away colors

The Baltimore Comets were a professional soccer team based in Baltimore, Maryland. Founded in 1974, the Comets were an expansion team that played two seasons in the North American Soccer League. The team originally played its home matches at Memorial Stadium but moved to Burdick Field located at Towson University during the 1975 season. At the conclusion of the 1975 NASL season the team moved to San Diego, California, rebranding as the Jaws.

== History ==
Looking to build off what was considered positive momentum in public interest in professional soccer, in January 1974 the North American Soccer League announced Baltimore as one of six cities awarded an expansion team for the upcoming 1974 season. (Note: Denver and Washington would also be awarded franchises before the season bringing the total number of team competing in the 1974 NASL season to 15.) Former Baltimore Bays head coach Doug Millward returned to the city to manage the team. The Comets played their first game at home on May 4, 1974, at Memorial Stadium in Baltimore. The team finished in second place in the Eastern Division qualifying for the playoffs as a wild card. Peter Silvester, on loan from Southend United F.C. was named 1974 league MVP. On August 15, 1974, Baltimore lost 0–1 in the quarterfinals to the Boston Minutemen at Alumni Stadium. The Comets participated in the 1975 NASL Indoor tournament as part of Region 3 playing at the Bayfront Center in St. Petersburg, Florida, and losing the two matches in which they played.

During the 1975 North American Soccer League season, the Comets were evicted from Memorial Stadium due to non-payment of rent and played the remaining part of the season at Burdick Field on the campus of Towson State University. The team ended the season in last place in the Eastern Division with a record of 9 wins and 13 losses (Note: The NASL eliminated tie games prior to the 1975 season. Matches that were level after 90 minutes would go to 15 minutes of sudden death overtime, and then onto a penalty shoot-out if needed.) and an average attendance of 2,641, the lowest in the league. Following the season, the team was sold and moved to San Diego.

== Media coverage ==
The Comets never had television coverage. They had radio coverage on at least 16 matches on WCAO-FM in 1975. Howard Mash was the sole announcer.

== Year-by-year ==
Year	League	W	L	T	Pts	Reg. season	Playoffs
1974	NASL	10	8	2	105	2nd, Eastern Division	Lost Quarterfinal (Boston Minutemen)
1975	NASL indoor	0	2	—	0	3rd, Region 3	did not qualify
1975	NASL	9	13	—	87	5th, Eastern Division	did not qualify

== Honors ==
NASL MVP

- 1974: Peter Silvester

NASL All-Stars

- 1974: Geoff Butler, Peter Silvester

Indoor Soccer Hall of Fame members

- 2019: Alan Mayer

== See also ==
- Baltimore Bays
- Baltimore Bays (1972–73)
- Baltimore Bays (1993–98)
- Maryland Bays
- Crystal Palace Baltimore
