= List of New York Cosmos (1971–1985) seasons =

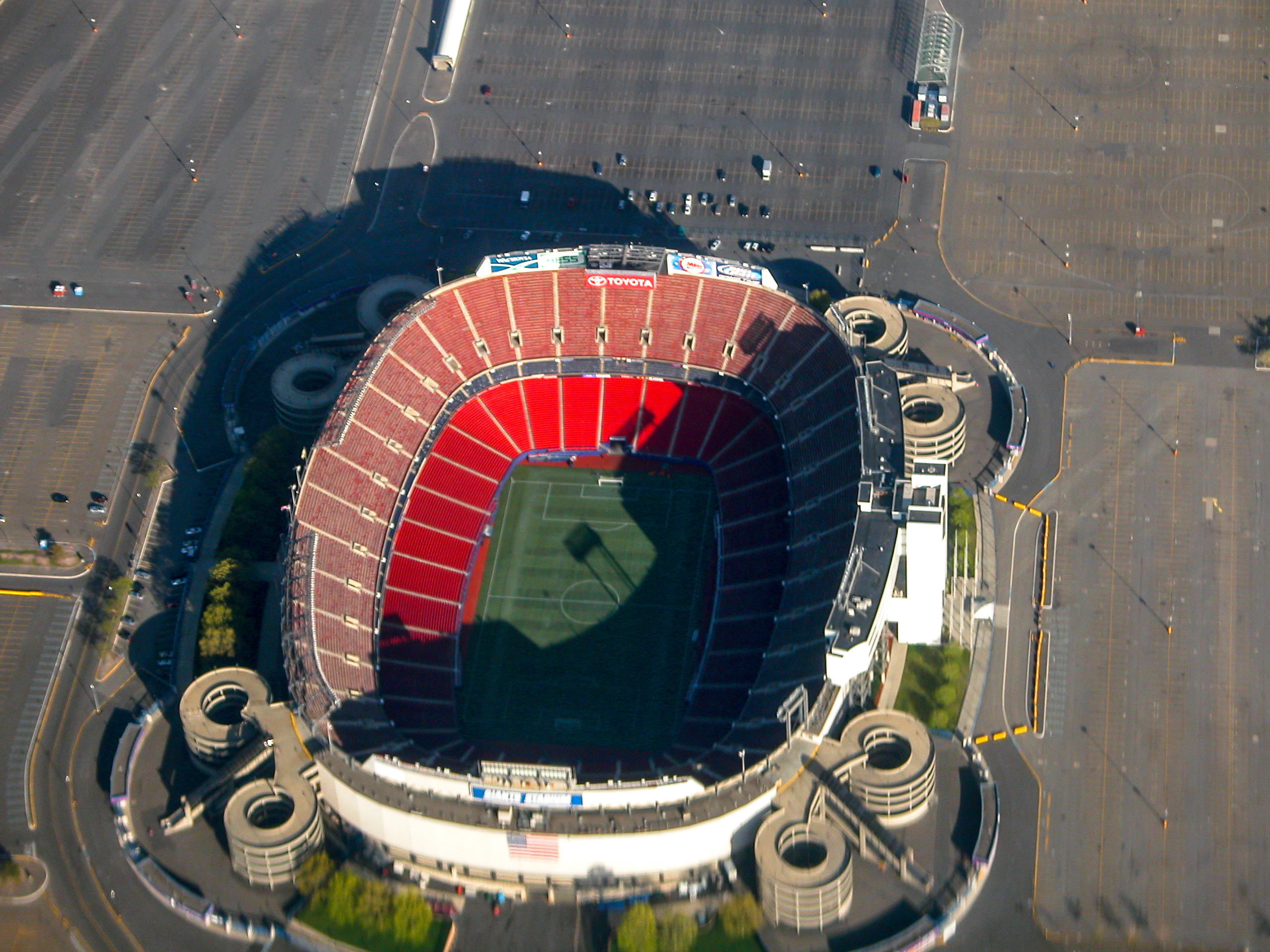
The Cosmos played at Giants Stadium in New Jersey from 1977 to 1985. The stadium is pictured in 2006.

The New York Cosmos were an American soccer club based in New York City. The side was originally created in 1971 by brothers Ahmet and Nesuhi Ertegun, with the support of Warner Brothers president Steve Ross. The new team entered the North American Soccer League (NASL), which was in its fourth season. Bankrolled by parent company Warner Communications, the Cosmos became the NASL's most successful side, winning a record five championships in front of the league's largest crowds. The team included international stars signed from European and South American clubs, including Brazilians Pelé and Carlos Alberto, West German Franz Beckenbauer, Italian striker Giorgio Chinaglia and many others.

When the team was sold to a Chinaglia-owned consortium in 1983, the Cosmos' financial resources were reduced dramatically; the majority of the team's key players were sold as a result. As a result, game performance declined. The Cosmos entered the Major Indoor Soccer League for the 1984–85 indoor season, but left mid-year after disappointing gates. After the NASL folded in March 1985, owners attempted to operate the team independently, but the team was dissolved later that year. A new incarnation of the Cosmos, formed in 2010, made its debut in the new North American Soccer League during the 2013 season.

== List of seasons ==
Champions	Runners-up	Missed play-offs†

Key to regular season record

- Conf = Conference
- Div = Division
- G = Games played
- W = Games won
- T = Games tied
- L = Games lost
- F = Goals for
- A = Goals against
- Pts = Points
- GB = Games behind
- % = Percentage of possible points won from wins and ties
- Pos = Final regular season position

Key to leagues, conferences, divisions and cups

- NASL = North American Soccer League
- MISL = Major Indoor Soccer League
- TC = Trans-Atlantic Challenge Cup
- Atl = Atlantic Conference
- Nat = National Conference
- Am = American Conference
- N = Northern Division
- E = Eastern Division

Key to play-off rounds and Trans-Atlantic Cup

- R1 = First round
- SF = Semifinals
- DRU = Division runners-up
- CRU = Conference runners-up
- RU = Runners-up
- C = Champions
- A "minigame" is equivalent to Extra time.

Key to scorers

- Gls = Number of goals scored
- Pts = Number of points scored
- ‡ Players with this background and symbol in the "Name" column scored a record number of points for the club during the corresponding season. This does not include indoor seasons.

== Seasons ==
=== Outdoor ===
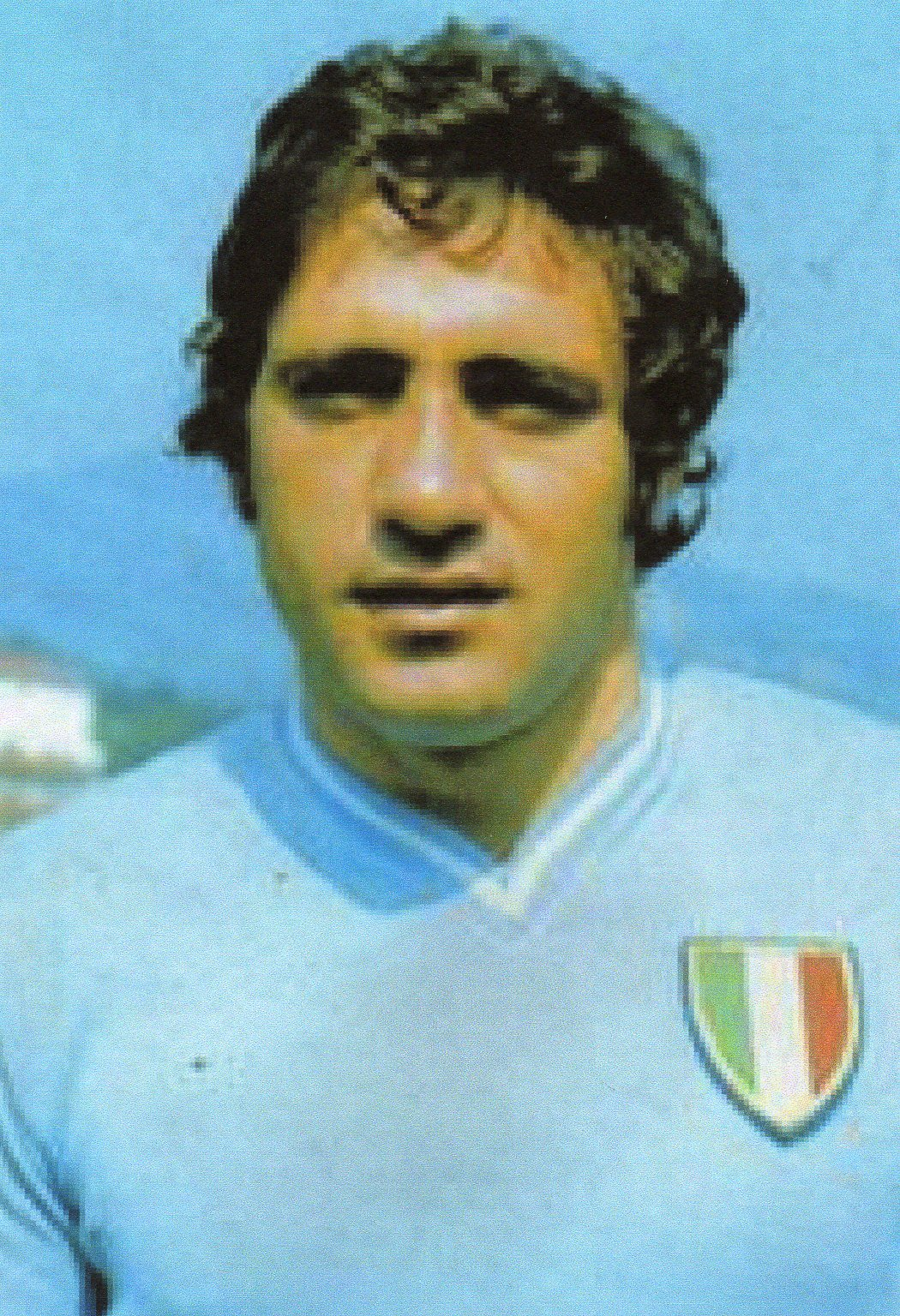
Giorgio Chinaglia, Cosmos' all-time top scorer with 193 goals

Season	Regular season												Playoffs	TC	Top scorer^{[A]}		
Season	League	Conf	Div	G	W	T^{[B]}	L	F	A	Pts	%	Pos	Playoffs	TC	Name	Gls	Pts^{[A]}
1971	NASL	–	N	24	9	5	10	51	55	117	.479	2nd	SF^{[a]}	–	Randy Horton‡	16	37
1972	NASL	–	N	14	7	4	3	28	16	77	.642	1st	C^{[b]}	–	Randy Horton	9	22
1973	NASL	–	E	19	7	7	5	31	23	91	.552	2nd	SF^{[c]}	–	Randy Horton^{[d]}	9	23
1974	NASL	–	N	20	4	2	14	28	40	58	.250	4th†	–	–	Randy Horton	9	22
1975	NASL	–	N	22	10	–	12	39	38	91	.454	3rd†	–	–	Julio Correa	4	17
1976	NASL	Atl	E	24	16	–	8	65	34	148	.666	2nd	DRU^{[e]}	–	Giorgio Chinaglia‡	19	49
1977	NASL	Atl	E	26	15	–	11	60	39	140	.576	2nd	C^{[f]}	–	Giorgio Chinaglia	15	38
1978	NASL	Nat	E	30	24	–	6	88	39	212	.800	1st	C^{[g]}	–	Giorgio Chinaglia‡	34	79
1979	NASL	Nat	E	30	24	–	6	84	52	216	.800	1st	CRU^{[h]}	–	Giorgio Chinaglia	26	57
1980	NASL	Nat	E	32	24	–	8	87	41	213	.750	1st	C^{[i]}	1st^{[j]}	Giorgio Chinaglia	32	77
1981	NASL	–	E	32	23	–	9	80	49	200	.718	1st	RU^{[k]}	2nd^{[l]}	Giorgio Chinaglia	29	74
1982	NASL	–	E	32	23	–	9	73	52	203	.718	1st	C^{[m]}	2nd^{[n]}	Giorgio Chinaglia	20	55
1983	NASL	–	E	30	22	–	8	87	49	194	.733	1st	R1^{[o]}	1st^{[p]}	Roberto Cabañas	25	66
1984	NASL	–	E	24	13	–	11	43	42	115	.541	3rd†	–	1st^{[q]}	Roberto Cabañas	8	20

=== Indoor ===
In the winter of 1975, the NASL organized a two-tiered, 16 team indoor tournament with four regional winners meeting in a "final-four" style championship. The New York Cosmos won their region at the Rochester War Memorial Arena by virtue of a tie-breaker, but lost both the semifinal and the third-place matches at the Cow Palace to Tampa Bay and Dallas respectively.

Season	Regular season											Playoffs	Top scorer^{[A]}		
Season	League	Conf	Div	G	W	L	F	A	GB	%	Pos	Playoffs	Name	Gls	Pts^{[A]}
1975	NASL; Indoor	–	Region 1	4	1	3	18	27	tournament only	.250	–	4th	–	–	–
1981–82	NASL; Indoor	Am	E	18	6	12	102	123	−3^{[C]}	.333	4th†	–	Giorgio Chinaglia	35	90
1982–83	n/a^{[D]}	–	–	–	–	–	–	–	–	–	–	–	–	–	–
1983–84	NASL; Indoor	–	–	32	20	12	183	148	−1^{[C]}	.625	3rd	RU^{[r]}	Chico Borja^{[s]}	29	66
1984–85	MISL	–	E	48^{[E]}	11	22	137	185	−13.5^{[E]}	.333	7th†	–	Mark Liveric	20	29

== Footnotes ==
A. ^{a} ^{b} The "top scorer" given is the top scorer of points. Goals scored two points, and assists one. These figures include the regular season only.
B. Starting in 1975, tied games were decided by a shootout.
C. The NASL's indoor seasons used the games behind system rather than points to rank the teams. The 1983–84 indoor season counted both goals and assists as one point.
D. The Cosmos did not enter an indoor league for the 1982–83 season.
E. The Cosmos pulled out of the Major Indoor Soccer League (MISL) after 33 games, citing low attendances. The MISL also used the games behind system, and ranked both goals and assists as one point.

=== NASL scoring system ===
Until 1974, the NASL scored thus:

- 6 points for a win
- 3 points for a tie
- 0 points for a loss
- 1 point per goal for up to three goals scored per game

After 1974, the system changed to the following:

- 6 points for a win
- 1 point for a win after a shootout (following a tie in regulation time)
- 0 points for a loss or shootout loss
- 1 point per goal for up to three goals scored per game

=== Indoor soccer ===
Indoor soccer features six players per team as opposed to the standard eleven, and is played without an offside rule on an artificial field of play. The pitch is far smaller than that used in regular soccer, with a regulation size of 200 feet by 85 feet, identical to a North American ice hockey rink. The goals and penalty areas are also scaled down. Instead of two halves of 45 minutes each, matches are divided into four quarters of 15 minutes.

=== Play-off scores ===
a. Lost to Atlanta, 0–2
b. Defeated St. Louis, 2–1
c. Lost to Dallas, 0–1
e. Lost to Tampa Bay, 1–3
f. Defeated Seattle, 2–1
g. Defeated Tampa Bay, 3–1
h. Lost to Vancouver, 0–2, 3–2, 0–1 (minigame, shootout)
i. Defeated Fort Lauderdale, 3–0
k. Lost to Chicago, 0–1 (shootout)
m. Defeated Seattle, 1–0
o. Lost to Montreal, 2–4, 0–1 (shootout)
r. Lost to San Diego, 0–3

=== Top scorers ===
d. Joey Fink scored 11 goals in 1973, but a lack of assists meant that his points total of 22 came behind Randy Horton's total of 23.
s. Stan Terlecki scored the most goals for New York during the 1983–84 season with 34, but his points tally of 57 fell short of Chico Borja's 66.

=== Trans-Atlantic Challenge Cup ===
j. Finished first out of New York, Vancouver, Manchester City (England) and A.S. Roma (Italy)
l. Finished second out of Seattle, New York, Celtic (Scotland) and Southampton (England)
n. Finished second out of Chicago, New York, S.S.C. Napoli (Italy) and Club Nacional de Football (Uruguay)
p. Finished first out of New York, AC Fiorentina (Italy), Seattle and São Paulo FC (Brazil)
q. Finished first out of New York, Udinese (Italy), FC Barcelona (Spain) and Fluminense (Brazil)
