= 1979 New York Cosmos season =

New York Cosmos
1979 season
- General manager: Krikor Yepremian
- Manager: (Italy) Eddie Firmani (Start of season) (United States) Ray Klivecka (Caretaker) (Brazil) Júlio Mazzei (After Klivecka)
- Stadium: Giants Stadium
- NASL: Division: 1st Overall: 1st Playoffs: Conference Final
- National Challenge Cup: Did not enter
- CONCACAF Champions' Cup: Did not enter
- Top goalscorer: League: ( goals); All: ( goals)
- Highest home attendance: 76,031 vs. TUL (August 26)
- Lowest home attendance: 30,195 vs. COV (May 16)
- Average home league attendance: 46,690
Home colors	Away colors

The 1979 New York Cosmos season was the ninth season for the New York Cosmos in the now-defunct North American Soccer League. 1979 saw the club continue their premiership streak to three seasons with the league's highest point total, and match their wins record while achieving a record point total, but the Cosmos' quest for a third straight NASL championship ended with a loss in the conference finals to the Vancouver Whitecaps.

== Squad ==
Note: Flags indicate national team as defined under FIFA eligibility rules; some limited exceptions apply. Players may hold more than one non-FIFA nationality.

No.	Pos.	Nation	Player
0	GK	CAN	Jack Brand
1	GK	TUR	Erol Yasin
2	DF	IRI	Andranik Eskandarian
3	DF	BRA	Francisco Marinho
4	DF	USA	Werner Roth
5	DF	BRA	Carlos Alberto
6	DF	GER	Franz Beckenbauer
7	FW	ENG	Dennis Tueart
8	MF	YUG	Vladislav Bogićević
9	FW	ITA	Giorgio Chinaglia
11	FW	POR	Seninho
12	DF	GER	Greg Ryan
12	DF	USA	Bobby Smith
13	MF	NED	Johan Neeskens
14	MF	ENG	Terry Garbett
15	DF	NED	Wim Rijsbergen

No.	Pos.	Nation	Player
16	MF	ARG	Toni Carbognani
17	MF	USA	Rick Davis
18	MF	USA	Boris Bandov
19	GK	GER	Hubert Birkenmeier
20	GK	USA	David Brcic
21	FW	USA	Gary Etherington
22	DF	USA	Kevin Eagan
23	DF	ITA	Giuseppe Wilson
24	DF	CAN	Garry Ayre
25	DF	USA	Santiago Formoso
26	FW	USA	Ron Atanasio
27	FW	USA	Joe Filian
28	FW	GHA	Abdul Razak
29	FW	USA	Mark Liveric
30	FW	ENG	Godfrey Ingram
31	MF	BRA	Nelsi Morais

== Results ==
=== Regular season ===
Pld = Games Played, W = Wins, L = Losses, GF = Goals For, GA = Goals Against, Pts = Points
6 points for a win, 1 point for a shootout win, 0 points for a loss, 1 point for each goal scored (up to three per game).

-Playoffs via division standings. -Playoffs via wildcard.

NC East Division standings
Pos	Team	Pld	W	L	GF	GA	GD	BP	Pts
1	New York Cosmos	30	24	6	84	52	+32	72	216
2	Washington Diplomats	30	19	11	68	50	+18	58	172
3	Toronto Blizzard	30	14	16	52	65	−13	49	133
4	Rochester Lancers	30	15	15	43	57	−14	42	132

Updated to match(es) played on September 2, 1979. Source: Overall standings

National Conference standings
Pos	Div	Team	Pld	W	L	GF	GA	GD	BP	Pts	Playoff qualification
1	E	New York Cosmos	30	24	6	84	52	+32	72	216	Division winners
2	C	Minnesota Kicks	30	21	9	67	48	+19	58	184	Division winners
3	W	Vancouver Whitecaps (N)	30	20	10	54	34	+20	52	172	Division winners
4	E	Washington Diplomats	30	19	11	68	50	+18	58	172	Division runners-up
5	W	Los Angeles Aztecs	30	18	12	62	47	+15	54	162	Division runners-up

Updated to match(es) played on September 2, 1979. Source: Overall standings
Rules for classification: 1) Division position; 2) Points; 3) Wins; 4) Goal differential
(N) Conference champion

Overall standings
Pos	Div	Team	Pld	W	L	GF	GA	GD	BP	Pts
1	NE	New York Cosmos	30	24	6	84	52	+32	72	216
2	AC	Houston Hurricane	30	22	8	61	46	+15	55	187
3	NC	Minnesota Kicks	30	21	9	67	48	+19	58	184
4	NW	Vancouver Whitecaps (C)	30	20	10	54	34	+20	52	172
5	NE	Washington Diplomats	30	19	11	68	50	+18	58	172

Updated to match(es) played on September 2, 1979. Source: soccerstats.us
Rules for classification: 1) Points; 2) Wins; 3) Goal differential
(C) NASL Champions

==== Matches ====
April 22, 1979: New York Cosmos 3, Fort Lauderdale Strikers 2 Giants Stadium 72,342

April 29, 1979: New York Cosmos 4, Philadelphia Fury 2 Giants Stadium 46,375

May 4, 1979: New York Cosmos 1, Toronto Blizzard 0 Varsity Stadium 29,483

May 6, 1979: New York Cosmos 3, Houston Hurricane 0 Giants Stadium 50,142

May 12, 1979: Tampa Bay Rowdies 3, New York Cosmos 2 Tampa Stadium 40,701

May 20, 1979: New York Cosmos 3, Tulsa Roughnecks 1 Giants Stadium 46,344

May 26, 1979: New York Cosmos 1, Portland Timber 1 (Cosmos won in shootout) Civic Center 18,254

May 28, 1979: Chicago Sting 3, New York Cosmos 1 Wrigley Field 21,127

June 3, 1979: New York Cosmos 3, Toronto Blizzard 1 Giants Stadium 38,762

June 9, 1979: New York Cosmos 4, Dallas Tornado 1 Giants Stadium 45,031

June 13, 1979: New York Cosmos 3, Tulsa Roughnecks 2 Skelly Stadium 30,162

June 16, 1979: Vancouver Whitecaps 4, New York Cosmos 1 Empire Stadium 32,372

June 20, 1979: Minnesota Kicks 3, New York Cosmos 2 Metropolitan Stadium 43,952

June 24, 1979: New York Cosmos 1, New England Tea Men 0 Giants Stadium 41,428

June 27, 1979: New York Cosmos 3, Portland Timber 1 Giants Stadium 33,721

July 1, 1979: New York Cosmos 5, Rochester Lancers 2 Giants Stadium 40,379

July 7, 1979: New York Cosmos 2, New England Tea Men 1 Foxboro Stadium 15,763

July 11, 1979: New York Cosmos 1, Seattle Sounders 1 (Sounders won in shootout) Giants Stadium 40,207

JUly 15, 1979: Vancouver Whitecaps 4, New York Cosmos 2 Giants Stadium 48,753

July 18, 1979: New York Cosmos 4, Fort Lauredale Strikers 3 Lockhart Stadium 19,850

July 21, 1979: New York Cosmos 1, Philadelphia Fury 0 Veterans Stadium 17,352

July 25, 1979: New York Cosmos 4, Minnesota Kicks 1 Giants Stadium 57,223

July 29, 1979: New York Cosmos 5, San Jose Earthquakes 0 Giants Stadium 35,450

August 1, 1979: New York Cosmos 3, Los Angeles Aztecs 1 Rose Bowl 38,606

August 5, 1979: New York Cosmos 4, Rochester Lancers 2 Holleder Memorial Stadium 18,881

August 8, 1979: New York Cosmos 4, Tampa Bay Rowdies 3 Giants Stadium 70,042

August 12, 1979: New York Cosmos 4, Washington Diplomats 4 (Cosmos won in a shootout) Giants Stadium 34,599

=== Postseason ===
==== Overview ====
===== First round =====
			Game 1	Game 2	Mini-game
Philadelphia Fury	-	Houston Hurricane	2 - 1	2 - 1		August 14, 20
Detroit Express	-	Tampa Bay Rowdies	0 - 3	1 - 3		August 15, 19
Chicago Sting	-	Fort Lauderdale Strikers	2 - 0	0 - 0		August 15, 18
San Diego Sockers	-	California Surf	4 - 2	7 - 2		August 15, 18
Tulsa Roughnecks	-	Minnesota Kicks	2 - 1 (ot)	2 - 1 (ot)		August 15, 19
Dallas Tornado	-	Vancouver Whitecaps	2 - 3	1 - 2		August 15, 18
Los Angeles Aztecs	-	Washington Diplomats	3 - 1	4 - 3		August 15, 19
Toronto Blizzard	-	New York Cosmos	1 - 3	0 - 2		August 16, 20

===== Conference semifinals =====
			Game 1	Game 2	Mini-game
San Diego Sockers	-	Chicago Sting	2 - 0	1 - 0		August 22, 25
Los Angeles Aztecs	-	Vancouver Whitecaps	3 - 2	0 - 1 (so)	0 - 1	August 22, 25
Philadelphia Fury	-	Tampa Bay Rowdies	2 - 3 (so)	0 - 1		August 23, 25
Tulsa Roughnecks	-	New York Cosmos	3 - 0	0 - 3	1 - 3	August 23, 26

===== Conference Championships =====
			Game 1	Game 2	Mini-game
Vancouver Whitecaps	-	New York Cosmos	2 - 0	2 - 3 (so)	1 - 0 (so)	August 29, September 1
San Diego Sockers	-	Tampa Bay Rowdies	2 - 1	2 - 3 (so)	0 - 1	August 30, September 2

===== Soccer Bowl '79 =====
September 8
2 pm EDT

Vancouver Whitecaps	2–1	Tampa Bay Rowdies
Whymark 13'; Whymark (Ball) 60'		Van der Veen (Anderson) 23'

Giants Stadium, East Rutherford
Attendance: 50,699
Referee: Gino D'Ippolito (USA)

=== Friendlies ===
Date	Opponent	Venue	Result	Att.	Scorers
February 17	(The Bahamas) Freeport All-Stars	A	12–0	3,500	Chinaglia (5), Davis (2), Tueart (2), ?
February 24	(The Bahamas) Freeport All-Stars	A	6–1	n/a	?
February 25	(The Bahamas) Nassau All-Stars	A	13–1	n/a	?
5 March	(Trinidad and Tobago) Trinidad All-Stars	A	1–1	15,800	Chinaglia
7 March	(Brazil) Náutico	N (Note: Held in Port of Spain, Trinidad and Tobago.)	0–0	20,000	–
15 March	(Colombia) América de Cali	A	2–0	40,000	Chinaglia, Marino
16 March	(Colombia) Atlético Nacional	A	0–2	15,000	–
20 March	(United States) Detroit Express	A	2–8	25,473	Bogićević, Davis
25 March	(Mexico) Universidad Autónoma	H	2–2	9,000	Chinaglia (2)
16 May	(England) Coventry City	H	3–1	30,195	Davis, Carlos Alberto, Etherington
6 June	Argentina	H	0–1	70,134	–
4 July	(Germany) Bayern Munich	H	0–2	42,366	–
September 20	(Hong Kong) Team Seiko	A	3–3	28,000	Chinaglia (2), ?
September 24	Hong Kong All-Stars	A	6–0	24,000	Seninho (2), Chinaglia (2), Etherington, ?
September 24	South Korea	A	0–1	20,000	–
September 30	South Korea	A	2–3	18,000	Chinaglia (2)
October 3	Indonesia	A	4–1	85,000	Chinaglia (4)
October 5	(Indonesia) All-Indonesian Select	A	1–1	55,000	Chinagliaq
October 7	Singapore	A	4–1	35,000	Carbogiani (2), Chinaglia (2)
October 10	Japan All-Stars	A	1–1	14,000	Etherington
October 14	Japan	A	2–2	50,000	Beckenbauer, Tueart
October 17	Malaysia	A	5–0	35,000	Chinaglia (3), Tueart (2)
October 21	(Australia) Victoria All-Stars	A	3–2	15,000	Neeskens (2), Chinaglia
October 24	Australia	A	1–2	60,000	Chinaglia
October 31	(Australia) Adelaide City	A	2–0	28,000	Tueart, Chinaglia

== See also ==
- 1979 North American Soccer League season
