= 1980 New York Cosmos season =

New York Cosmos
1980 season
- General manager: Krikor Yepremian
- Manager: (Brazil) Júlio Mazzei (Start of season) (Germany) Hennes Weisweiler (After Mazzei) (Turkey) Yasin Özdenak (Joint with Wiesweiler)
- Stadium: Giants Stadium
- NASL: Division: 1st Overall: 1st Playoffs: Champions
- National Challenge Cup: Did not enter
- CONCACAF Champions' Cup: Did not enter
- Top goalscorer: League: ( goals); All: ( goals)
- Highest home attendance: 71,413 vs. NASL (September 24)
- Lowest home attendance: 27,746 vs. ROM (May 24)
- Average home league attendance: 42,754
Home colors	Away colors

The 1980 New York Cosmos season was the tenth season for the New York Cosmos in the now-defunct North American Soccer League. The Cosmos completed their third double, finishing 1st in the overall league table and defeating the Fort Lauderdale Strikers 3–0 in Soccer Bowl '80.

== Squad ==
Note: Flags indicate national team as defined under FIFA eligibility rules; some limited exceptions apply. Players may hold more than one non-FIFA nationality.

No.	Pos.	Nation	Player
1	GK	GER	Hubert Birkenmeier
2	DF	IRI	Andranik Eskandarian
3	DF	CAN	Bruce Wilson
4	DF	BRA	Oscar
5	DF	BRA	Carlos Alberto
6	DF	GER	Franz Beckenbauer
7	MF	PAR	Julio César Romero
8	MF	YUG	Vladislav Bogićević
9	FW	ITA	Giorgio Chinaglia
11	FW	POR	Seninho
12	MF	USA	Larry Hulcer
13	MF	NED	Johan Neeskens

No.	Pos.	Nation	Player
15	DF	NED	Wim Rijsbergen
16	FW	USA	Angelo DiBernardo
17	MF	USA	Rick Davis
18	MF	USA	Boris Bandov
19	FW	PAR	Roberto Cabañas
20	FW	BEL	François Van der Elst
21	GK	USA	David Brcic
23	MF	BRA	Nelsi Morais
25	DF	USA	Jeff Durgan
14, 29	FW	USA	Mark Liveric

== Results ==
=== Regular season ===
Pld = Games Played, W = Wins, L = Losses, GF = Goals For, GA = Goals Against, Pts = Points
6 points for a win, 1 point for a shootout win, 0 points for a loss, 1 point for each goal scored (up to three per game).

==== National Eastern Division Standings ====
Pos	Club	Pld	W	L	GF	GA	GD	Pts
1	New York Cosmos	32	24	8	87	41	+46	213
2	Washington Diplomats	32	17	15	72	61	+11	159
3	Toronto Blizzard	32	14	18	49	65	-16	128
4	Rochester Lancers	32	12	20	42	67	-25	109

==== Overall League Placing ====
Pos	Club	Pld	W	L	GF	GA	GD	Pts
1	New York Cosmos	32	24	8	87	41	+46	213
2	Seattle Sounders	32	25	7	74	31	+43	207
3	Chicago Sting	32	21	11	80	50	+30	187
4	Los Angeles Aztecs	32	20	12	61	52	+9	174
5	Tampa Bay Rowdies	32	19	13	61	50	+11	168

==== Matches ====
- April 5 - Houston Hurricane 3, New York Cosmos 3 (Cosmos win in a shootout) The Astrodome Attendance 15,916
- April 9 - Fort Lauderdale Strikers 4, New York Cosmos 1 Lockhart Stadium Attendance 18,572
- April 13 - Minnesota Kicks 1, New York Cosmos 1 (Cosmos win a shootout) Giants Stadium Attendance 51,225
- April 20 - New York Cosmos 4, Tampa Bay Rowdies 2 Giants Stadium Attendance 46,182
- April 26 - Tulsa Roughnecks 2, New York Cosmos 1 Skelly Stadium Attendance 30,822
- May 4 - New York Cosmos 2, Dallas Tornado 0 Giants Stadium Attendance 41,378
- May 8 - New York Cosmos 3, Toronto Blizzard 1 Varsity Stadium Attendance 24,913
- May 11 - New York Cosmos 4, Memphis Rogues 0 Giants Stadium Attendance 31,458
- May 16 - New York Cosmos 4, California Surf 1 Anaheim Stadium Attendance 8,660
- June 1 - New York Cosmos 1, Washington Diplomats 1 (Cosmos win in a shootout) Robert F. Kennedy Stadium Attendance 53,351
- June 4 - New York Cosmos 2, New England Tea Men 1 Giants Stadium Attendance 34,723
- June 8 - New York Cosmos 6, Atlanta Chiefs 0 Giants Stadium Attendance 35,007
- June 11 - New York Cosmos 4, Rochester Lancers 2 Holleder Memorial Stadium Attendance 16,110
- June 14 - New York Cosmos 3, Tampa Bay Rowdies 3 (Rowdies win in a shootout) Attendance 54,427
- June 16 - New England Tea Men 2, New York Cosmos 1 Foxboro Stadium Attendance 28,356
- June 22 - New York Cosmos 2, Fort Lauderdale Strikers 1 Giants Stadium Attendance 70,312
- June 24 - Los Angeles Aztecs 2, New York Cosmos 0 Rose Bowl Attendance 26,325
- June 29 - New York Cosmos 3, Vancouver Whitecaps 0 Empire Stadium Attendance 32,280
- July 2 - New York Cosmos 3, Toronto Blizzard 1 Giants Stadium Attendance 33,281
- July 6 - New York Cosmos 4, Portland Timbers 1 Giants Stadium Attendance 41,260
- July 9 - New York Cosmos 2, Philadelphia Fury 1 Giants Stadium Attendance 31,783
- July 12 - Detroit Express 0, New York Cosmos 0 (Express Win in a shootout) Pontiac Silverdome Attendance 27,234
- July 16 - Philadelphia Fury, 2 New York Cosmos 1 Veterans Stadium Attendance 15,213
- July 20 - New York Cosmos 3, Seattle Sounders 1 Giants Stadium Attendance 60,182
- July 23 - New York Cosmos 5, San Diego Sockers 0 Giants Stadium Attendance 33,008
- August 3 - New York Cosmos 4, Los Angeles Aztecs 1 Giants Stadium Attendance 48,019
- August 7 - New York Cosmos 3, Edmonton Drillers 2 Giants Stadium Attendance 30,283
- August 9 - New York Cosmos 1, Seattle Sounders 0 Kingdome Attendance 49,606
- August 13 - New York Cosmos 3, Atlanta Chiefs 2 Atlanta-Fulton County Stadium Attendance 13,117
- August 17 - New York Cosmos 1, Washington Diplomats 1 (Diplomats win a Shootout) Giants Stadium Attendance 55,764
- August 20 - New York Cosmos 4, Dallas Tornado 1 Texas Stadium Attendance 13,475
- August 24 - New York Cosmos 5, Rochester Lancers 0 Giants Stadium Attendance 40,383

=== Postseason ===
==== Overview ====
===== First round =====
			Game 1	Game 2	Shootout
Minnesota Kicks	-	Dallas Tornado	0 - 1	0 - 2		August 27, 30
San Diego Sockers	-	Chicago Sting	2 - 1	2 - 3	2 - 1	August 27, 30
Tampa Bay Rowdies	-	New England Tea Men	1 - 0	4 - 0		August 27, 30
Vancouver Whitecaps	-	Seattle Sounders	1 - 2	1 - 3		August 27, 30
Washington Diplomats	-	Los Angeles Aztecs	1 - 0	1 - 2	0 - 2	August 27, 30
Houston Hurricane	-	Edmonton Drillers	1 - 2	1 - 0	0 - 1	August 27, 31
California Surf	-	Fort Lauderdale Strikers	1 - 2	2 - 0	0 - 1	August 28, 31
Tulsa Roughnecks	-	New York Cosmos	1 - 3	1 - 8		August 28, 31

===== Quarter-finals =====
			Game 1	Game 2	Shootout
Los Angeles Aztecs	-	Seattle Sounders	3 - 0	0 - 4	2 - 1	September 3, 5
Edmonton Drillers	-	Fort Lauderdale Strikers	0 - 1	3 - 2	0 - 3	September 3, 6
Dallas Tornado	-	New York Cosmos	2 - 3	3 - 0	0 - 3	September 3, 7
San Diego Sockers	-	Tampa Bay Rowdies	6 - 3	0 - 6	2 - 1	September 4, 7

===== Semi-finals =====
			Game 1	Game 2	Shootout
San Diego Sockers	-	Fort Lauderdale Strikers	1 - 2	4 - 2	0 - 3	September 11, 13
Los Angeles Aztecs	-	New York Cosmos	1 - 2	1 - 3		September 11, 13

== Soccer Bowl '80 ==
Note: Newspaper reports and official NASL records stated goal times to the second (ex: 10:23) instead of the international standard of rounding up (ex: 11th minute).

September 21	New York Cosmos	3–0	Fort Lauderdale Strikers	RFK Stadium, Washington, D.C.
12:30 pm EDT	Romero; Chinaglia; Chinaglia (87:07)	Report		Attendance: 50,768; Referee: Paul Avis (Canada)

=== Friendlies ===
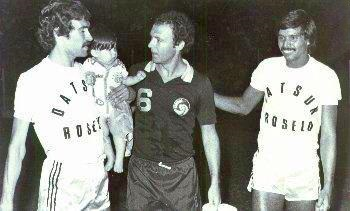
Franz Beckenbauer and players of Cipolletti

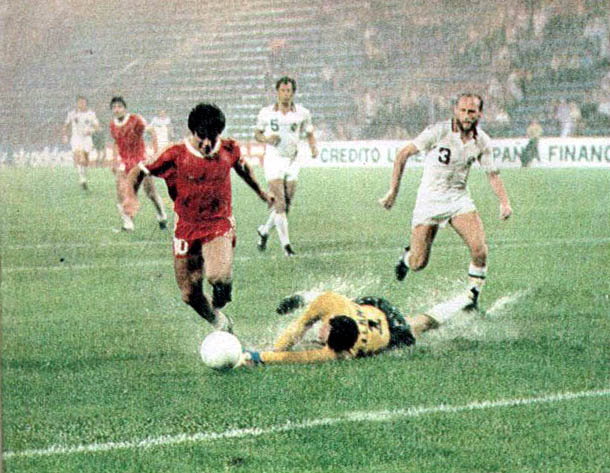
Diego Maradona scoring for Argentinos Juniors

Date	Opponent	Venue	Result	Att.	Scorers	Ref.
February 24	(The Bahamas) Bahamas All Stars	A	4–0	n/a	Romero, Seninho, Oscar, Chinaglia	
March 9	(Brazil) Nacional Fast Clube	A (Note: Held in Estadio Vivaldo Lima, Manaus.)	0–0	70,000	–	
March 13	(Brazil) Santos	A	2–1	25,000	Beckenbauer, Davis	
March 16	(Brazil) Uberlandia	A	1–1	15,000	Chinaglia	
March 18	(Argentina) Cipolletti	A	1–1	15,000	Morais	
March 21	(Argentina) Argentinos Juniors	A (Note: Held in José Amalfitani Stadium.)	2–1	27,000	Chinaglia (2)	
March 25	(Mexico) Tigres	A	1–2	40,000	Chinaglia	
March 28	(United States) Los Angeles Aztecs	A	3–1	24,219	Romero (2), Chinaglia	
March 30	(Mexico) Cruz Azul	A	1–2	26,199	Romero	
April 29	(Germany) Cologne	H	3–1	24,784	Chinaglia (2), Romero	
May 21	(England) Manchester City	H	3–2	31,480	Chinaglia (2), Bogićević	
May 24	(Italy) Roma	H	5–3	27,746	Chinaglia (3), Carlos Alberto, Peccenini (o.g.)	
May 26	(Canada) Vancouver Whitecaps	H	1–1	60,384	Chinaglia	
July 30	(Argentina) River Plate	H	1–1	47,320	Bogićević	
Sept 24	(United States) NASL Select (Note: Beckenbauer's farewell game.)	H	2–3	71,413	Pelé, (Note: Retired since October 1977, Pelé returned to wear his #10 again for this match.) Cabañas	
October 1	(Socialist Federal Republic of Yugoslavia) Hajduk Split	A	1–0	45,000	Chinaglia	
October 4	(Portugal) Sporting Lisboa	A	1–1	35,000	Chinaglia	
October 10	(France) Girondins de Bordeaux	A	1–4	4,200	DiBernardo	
October 12	(Italy) Napoli	A	2–0	12,000	Seninho, Chinaglia	

== See also ==
- 1980 North American Soccer League season
