= 1982 New York Cosmos season =

New York Cosmos
1982 season
- Manager: (Brazil) Júlio Mazzei
- Stadium: Giants Stadium
- NASL: Division: 1st Overall: 1st Playoffs: Champions
- National Challenge Cup: Did not enter
- CONCACAF Champions' Cup: Did not enter
- Top goalscorer: League: ( goals); All: ( goals)
- Highest home attendance: 52,436 vs. TB (April 18)
- Lowest home attendance: 14,212 vs. CNF (May 29)
- Average home league attendance: 28,479
Home colors	Away colors

The 1982 New York Cosmos season was the 12th season for the New York Cosmos in the now-defunct North American Soccer League. The Cosmos completed their fourth double—a feat not matched by any NASL or, as yet, MLS club—finishing 37 points ahead of Seattle for the league premiership, and defeating the Sounders in Soccer Bowl '82 for the league championship.

== Squad ==
Note: Flags indicate national team as defined under FIFA eligibility rules; some limited exceptions apply. Players may hold more than one non-FIFA nationality.

No.	Pos.	Nation	Player
1	GK	GER	Hubert Birkenmeier
2	DF	IRI	Andranik Eskandarian
3	DF	CAN	Robert Iarusci
4	DF	USA	Jeff Durgan
5	DF	BRA	Carlos Alberto
6	MF	USA	Rick Davis
7	MF	PAR	Julio César Romero
8	MF	YUG	Vladislav Bogićević
9	FW	ITA	Giorgio Chinaglia
11	FW	POR	Seninho
12	FW	USA	Steve Moyers
13	MF	NED	Johan Neeskens

No.	Pos.	Nation	Player
14	FW	RSA	Steve Wegerle
15	DF	NED	Wim Rijsbergen
16	FW	USA	Angelo DiBernardo
17	FW	USA	Steve Hunt
18	MF	USA	Boris Bandov
19	FW	PAR	Roberto Cabanas
21	GK	USA	David Brcic
22	DF	YUG	Ivan Buljan
24	FW	USA	Darryl Gee
26	DF	USA	Erhardt Kapp
28	FW	USA	Chico Borja
30	MF	TTO	Richard Chinapoo

== Results ==
=== Transatlantic Challenge Cup ===
Date	Opponent	Venue	Result	Attendance	Scorers
May 26, 1982	Napoli	H	2–2	28,887	Romero (2)
May 29, 1982	Nacional (Uru)	H	3–1	14,212	Cabañas, Moyers, Chinaglia
May 31, 1982	Chicago Sting	H	3–4	36,904	Chinaglia (3)

=== Spring Cup ===
Date	Opponent	Venue	Result	Attendance	Scorers
March 27, 1982	Chicago Sting	A	1–2(AET)	13,251	Margetic, Chinaglia
March 30, 1982	Malmö FF	A	0–1	15,921	Eskandarian(own goal)

=== Regular season ===
Pld = Games Played, W = Wins, L = Losses, GF = Goals For, GA = Goals Against, Pts = Points
6 points for a win, 1 point for a shootout win, 0 points for a loss, 1 point for each goal scored (up to three per game).

==== Eastern Division Standings ====
Pos	Club	Pld	W	L	GF	GA	GD	Pts
1	New York Cosmos	32	23	9	73	52	+21	203
2	Montreal Manic	32	19	13	60	43	+17	159
3	Toronto Blizzard	32	17	15	64	47	+17	151
4	Chicago Sting	32	13	19	56	67	−11	129

==== Overall league placing ====
Pos	Club	Pld	W	L	GF	GA	GD	Pts
1	New York Cosmos	32	23	9	73	52	+21	203
2	Seattle Sounders	32	18	14	72	48	+24	166
3	Fort Lauderdale Strikers	32	18	14	64	74	−10	163
4	San Diego Sockers	32	19	13	71	54	+17	162
5	Vancouver Whitecaps	32	20	12	58	48	+10	160

==== Matches ====
April 10, 1982: New York Cosmos 3, Jacksonville Tea Men 2 Jacksonville, Fl Attendance: 4,537

April 18, 1982, New York Cosmos 2, Tampa Bay Rowdies 0 Giants Stadium Attendance 52,436

April 24, 1982: New York Cosmos 3, Chicago Sting 1 Wrigley Field Attendance 16,149

April 28, 1982: Fort Lauderdale Strikers 2, New York Cosmos 1 Lockhart Stadium Attendance 17,951

May 2, 1982: New York Cosmos 2, Jacksonville Tea Men 0 Giants Stadium Attendance 32,710

May 5, 1982: New York Cosmos 1, Toronto Blizzard 2 Varsity Stadium Attendance 16,746

May 8, 1982: New York Cosmos 3, Tulsa Roughnecks 2 Skelly Stadium Attendance 21,118

May 12, 1982: New York Cosmos 2, San Diego Sockers 1 San Diego Sports Arena 14,805

May 16, 1982: Chicago Sting 1, New York Cosmos 3 Giants Stadium 36,193

May 19, 1982: New York Cosmos 3, Portland Timbers 2 Civic Stadium 15,233

May 23, 1982: New York Cosmos 3, Fort Lauderdale Strikers 2 Giants Stadium 18,710

June 6, 1982: New York Cosmos 2, Toronto Blizzard 1 Giants Stadium 18,938

June 12, 1982: New York Cosmos 2, Tampa Bay Rowdies 0 Tampa Stadium 28,475

June 18. 1982: Montreal Manic 3, New York Cosmos 2 Olympic Stadium 32,654

June 20, 1982: New York Cosmos 3, Seattle Sounders 2 Giants Stadium 27,397

June 23, 1982: New York Cosmos 3, Vancouver Whitecaps 2 Giants Stadium 22,914

June 27, 1982: New York Cosmos 3, Edmonton Drillers 1 Giants Stadium 26,379

June 30, 1982: San Jose Earthquakes 4, New York Cosmos 2 Spartan Stadium 18,111

July 3, 1982: Vancouver Whitecaps 1, New York Cosmos 0 Empire Stadium 22,618

July 7, 1982: Edmonton Drillers 2, New York Cosmos 1 Clarke Stadium 8,697

July 10, 1982: New York Cosmos 2, Chicago Sting 1 Wrigley Field 18,023

July 14, 1982: New York Cosmos 3, Montreal Manic 2 Giants Stadium 25,634

July 18, 1982: New York Cosmos 6, Portland Timbers 2 Giants Stadium 24,387

July 22, 1982: New York Cosmos 1, Toronto Blizzard 0 Varsity Stadium 10,856

July 25, 1982: New York Cosmos 2, San Diego Sockers 1 Giants Stadium 29,572

July 28, 1982: New York Cosmos 2, San Jose Earthquakes 1 Giants Stadium 18,828

August 1, 1982: New York Cosmos 3, Montreal Manic 2 Giants Stadium 38,891

August 4, 1982: Seattle Sounders 3, New York Cosmos 2 Kingdome attendance 23,925

August 11, 1982: Toronto Blizzard 4, New York Cosmos 1 Giants Stadium Attendance 22,158

August 15, 1982: New York Cosmos 3, Chicago Sting 1 Giants Stadium Attendance 36,241

August 18, 1982: New York Cosmos 3, Tulsa Roughnecks 1 Giants Stadium Attendance 28,638

August 20, 1982: Montreal Manic 3, New York Cosmos 1 Olympic Stadium 34,251

=== Postseason ===
==== Overview ====
===== Quarter-finals =====
			Game 1	Game 2	Game 3
New York Cosmos	–	Tulsa Roughnecks	5–0	0–1	1–0	August 25, 28, September 1
Seattle Sounders	–	Toronto Blizzard	4–2	1–2	4–2	August 25, 28, September 1
Montreal Manic	–	Fort Lauderdale Strikers	3–2	0–1	1–4	August 25, 28, September 1
San Diego Sockers	–	Vancouver Whitecaps	5–1	0–1	2–1	August 25, 28, September 1

===== Semi-finals =====
			Game 1	Game 2	Game 3
New York Cosmos	–	San Diego Sockers	2–1	2–1		September 5, 8
Seattle Sounders	–	Fort Lauderdale Strikers	2–0	3–4	1–0	September 4, 8, 10

===== Soccer Bowl '82 =====
September 18	New York Cosmos	1–0	Seattle Sounders	San Diego, Jack Murphy Stadium

=== Friendlies ===
Date	Opponent	Venue	Result	Attendance	Scorers
March 7	(The Bahamas) Bahamas All-Stars	A	5–0	2,000	Cabañas, Romero, Chinaglia (2), Moyers
March 23	(Guatemala) Comunicaciones	N (Note: Held in Los Angeles Memorial Coliseum.)	0-0 (4–2 p)	26,693	–
March 25	Honduras	N	3–1	8,166	Romero, Chinaglia, Neeskens
March 27	(United States) Chicago Sting	N (Note: Held in Vancouver, Canada.)	1–2	13,251	Chinaglia
March 30	(Sweden) Malmö	A	0–1	15,921	–
April 4	Peru	H	5–1	37,408	Romero (2), Chinaglia (2), Moyers
May 3	(United States) Pennsylvania Stoners	A	1–0	3,000	DeMatthaeis
May 26	(Italy) Napoli	H	2–2	28,887	Romero (2)
May 29	(Uruguay) Nacional	H	3–1	14,212	Cabañas, Moyers, Chinaglia
May 31	(United States) Chicago Sting	H	3–4	36,904	Chinaglia (3)
June 8	(Italy) Milan	H	1–0	17,896	Hunt
September 28	(Brazil) Flamengo (Note: Carlos Alberto's farewell game.)	H	3–3	37,312	Chinaglia (3)
October 9	(Mexico) América	H	0–1	14,920	–
October 17	(Australia) Victoria All-Stars	A	3–2	15,000	Neeskens, Chinaglia, ?
October 28	South Korea	A	2–1	30,000	Neeskens, Bogićević
October 30	South Korea	A	1–0	40,000	Chinaglia
November 3	Japan	A	3–1	15,000	Davis, Chinaglia (2)
November 7	Japan	A	3–1	11,000	Chinaglia (2), Bogićević
November 10	Japan	A	1–0	35,000	Chinaglia

== See also ==
- 1982 North American Soccer League season
