= 1983 New York Cosmos season =

New York Cosmos
1983 season
- Manager: (Brazil) Júlio Mazzei
- Stadium: Giants Stadium
- NASL: Division: 1st Overall: 1st Playoffs: First round
- National Challenge Cup: Did not enter
- CONCACAF Champions' Cup: Did not enter
- Top goalscorer: League: (Paraguay) Roberto Cabañas (24 goals); All: (Paraguay) Roberto Cabañas (25+ goals)
- Highest home attendance: 42,385 vs. CHI (May 17)
- Lowest home attendance: 12,240 vs. FTL (Jun 24)
- Average home league attendance: 27,242
Home colors	Away colors

The 1983 New York Cosmos season was the original Cosmos franchise's thirteenth season of existence, and their thirteenth in the original North American Soccer League. At the time, the NASL represented the top tier of American soccer. Finishing the season with 194 points off of 22 wins and eight losses, the Cosmos clinched their sixth-consecutive regular season championship, and their seventh overall. In the postseason, however, the Cosmos lost to Montreal Manic.

== Roster ==
Note: Flags indicate national team as defined under FIFA eligibility rules; some limited exceptions apply. Players may hold more than one non-FIFA nationality.

No.	Pos.	Nation	Player
1	GK	GER	Hubert Birkenmeier
2	DF	IRI	Andranik Eskandarian
3	DF	CAN	Robert Iarusci
4	MF	USA	Rick Davis
5	DF	USA	Darryl Gee
6	DF	GER	Franz Beckenbauer
7	MF	PAR	Julio César Romero
8	MF	YUG	Vladislav Bogićević
9	FW	ITA	Giorgio Chinaglia

No.	Pos.	Nation	Player
12	FW	USA	Steve Moyers
13	MF	NED	Johan Neeskens
14	MF	TTO	Richard Chinapoo
15	DF	NED	Wim Rijsbergen
16	MF	USA	Angelo DiBernardo
16	FW	ROU	Erhardt Kapp
19	MF	USA	Roberto Cabañas
21	GK	USA	David Brcic
23	MF	USA	Mike Fox

== Results ==
=== Preseason ===
Date	Opponent	Venue	Result	Attendance	Scorers
April 17, 1983	Vancouver Whitecaps	A	1-2	19,598	Rijsbergen, N/A

=== Regular season ===
==== Standings ====
W = Wins, L = Losses, T= Ties GF = Goals For, GA = Goals Against, Pts= point system

6 points for a win 1 point for a shootout win 0 points for a loss 1 point for each regulation goal scored up to three per game

Eastern Division

Pos	Club	Pld	W	L	GF	GA	GD	Pts
1	New York Cosmos	30	22	8	87	49	+38	194
2	Chicago Sting	30	15	15	66	73	−7	147
3	Toronto Blizzard	30	16	14	51	48	+3	135
4	Montreal Manic	30	12	18	58	71	−13	124

Overall

Pos	Club	Pld	W	L	GF	GA	GD	Pts
1	New York Cosmos	30	22	8	87	49	+38	194
2	Vancouver Whitecaps	30	24	6	63	34	+29	187
3	Golden Bay Earthquakes	30	20	10	71	54	+17	169
4	Chicago Sting	30	15	15	66	73	−7	147
5	Tulsa Roughnecks	30	17	13	56	49	+7	145

==== Matches ====
- p.l.: lost on penalties
- p.w.: won on penalties

Date	Opponent	Venue	Result	Attendance	Scorers
April 24, 1983	Toronto Blizzard	A	1–2	25,375	Chinaglia
May 1, 1983	Montreal Manic	H	6–0	41,946	Cabanas, Romero (3), Chinaglia (2)
May 4, 1983	Fort Lauderdale Strikers	A	1–4	13,741	Chinaglia
May 8, 1983	Fort Lauderdale Strikers	H	3–2	25,134	Chinaglia (2), Cabanas
May 11, 1983	Seattle Sounders	A	0–3	10,085	Chinaglia, Cabanas, Bogićević
May 15, 1983	Tulsa Roughnecks	H	5–2	22,621	Chinaglia (3), Cabanas, Moyers
May 21, 1983	Tulsa Roughnecks	A	1–2	19,160	Chinaglia, Moyers
May 25, 1983	Golden Bay Earthquakes	H	5–1	22,841	Chinaglia, Moyers, Davis, Neeskens, Cabanas
June 8, 1983	San Diego Sockers	A	0–1	5,318	Cabanas
June 11, 1983	Golden Bay Earthquakes	A	1–3	16,202	Chinaglia
June 17, 1983	Team America	A	1–1 (p.l.)	31,112	Cabanas
June 19, 1983	Toronto Blizzard	H	5–1	25,247	Cabanas (2), Chinaglia (2), Beckenbauer
June 22, 1983	Chicago Sting	H	2–3	22,368	Cabanas, Chinaglia
June 25, 1983	Montreal Manic	A	1–2	8,407	DiBernardo, Bogićević
June 29, 1983	Vancouver Whitecaps	H	3–0	29,141	Cabanas, Moyers, Bogićević
July 1, 1983	Chicago Sting	A	2–5	16,244	Cabanas, Moyers
July 6, 1983	Team America	H	4–0	35,228	Moyers, Bogićević, Romero, Cabanas
July 10, 1983	Vancouver Whitecaps	A	0–2	50,205	
July 17, 1983	Tulsa Roughnecks	H	3–0	24,296	Cabanas, Romero, Moyers
July 20, 1983	Seattle Sounders	H	3–3 (p.w.)	19,825	Cabanas (2), Kapp
July 23, 1983	Tampa Bay Rowdies	A	4–5	13,709	Cabanas (3), Moyers, Bogićević
July 30, 1983	Chicago Sting	A	1–2	18,546	Romero
August 3, 1983	San Diego Sockers	H	3–1	22,756	Romero (2), Davis
August 6, 1983	Montreal Manic	A	2–4	15,158	Cabanas, Bogićević, Moyers
August 10, 1983	Team America	A	1–2	11,612	Davis, Cabanas
August 14, 1983	Montreal Manic	H	3–0	45,821	Davis, Romero, Moyers
August 16, 1983	Toronto Blizzard	A	0–1	11,428	Moyers
August 21, 1983	Chicago Sting	H	5–3	30,678	Chinaglia (2), Davis, Beckenbauer, Cabanas
August 28, 1983	Tampa Bay Rowdies	H	3–1	19,868	Romero, Moyers, Bogićević
September 2, 1983	Toronto Blizzard	H	6–3	20,865	Cabanas (2), Moyers (2), Neeskens, Romero

=== Postseason ===
==== Overview ====
===== Quarter-finals =====
			Game 1	Game 2	Game 3
New York Cosmos	-	Montreal Manic	2 - 4	0 - 1		September 6, 12
Tulsa Roughnecks	-	Fort Lauderdale Strikers	3 - 2	4 - 2		September 6, 10
Golden Bay Earthquakes	-	Chicago Sting	6 - 1	0 - 1	5 - 2	September 7, 12, 14
Vancouver Whitecaps	-	Toronto Blizzard	1 - 0	3 - 4	0 - 1	September 8, 12, 15

===== Semi-finals =====
			Game 45	Game 2	Game 3
Tulsa Roughnecks	-	Montreal Manic	2 - 1	0 - 1	3 - 0	September 18, 26, 28
Golden Bay Earthquakes	-	Toronto Blizzard	0 - 1	0 - 2		September 17, 27

===== Soccer Bowl '83 =====
October 1	Tulsa Roughnecks	1–0	Toronto Blizzard	Vancouver, BC Place Stadium

==== Matches ====
Date	Opponent	Venue	Result	Attendance	Scorers
September 6, 1983	Montreal Manic	H	2-4	17,202	Chinaglia, Bogićević
September 12, 1983	Montreal Manic	A	0-0 (SOL)	20,726	

=== Friendlies ===
Date	Opponent	Venue	Result	Attendance	Scorers
May 30	(Italy) Fiorentina	H	4–1	31,294	Chinaglia, Moyers, ? (o.g.)
June 2	(Brazil) Sao Paulo	H	2–3	26,641	Bogićević, Romero
June 5	(United States) Seattle Sounders	H	4–1	51,825	Cabañas, Chinaglia, Romero, Bogićević
June 15	(Germany) Hamburger SV	H	7–2	30,720	Chinaglia (2), Bogićević (2), Davis, Neeskens, Cabañas
October 16	(Italy) Lazio (Note: Chinaglia's farewell game. He played for Lazio in the second half.)	A	1–3	40,000	?
October 23	(African Union) Africa Sport	A	1–2	45,000	Neeskens
October 26	(Cameroon) Tonelle Yaoundé	A	2–0	30,000	DiBernardo, Rijsbergen
October 28	(Cameroon) Canon Yaoundé	A	3–1	45,000	Gee, DiBernardo, Borja

== See also ==
- 1983 North American Soccer League season
