= 1981 New York Cosmos season =

New York Cosmos
1981 season
- General manager: Krikor Yepremian
- Manager: (Germany) Hennes Weisweiler (Joint with Özdenak) (Turkey) Yasin Özdenak (Joint with Wiesweiler)
- Stadium: Giants Stadium
- NASL: Division: 1st Overall: 1st Playoffs: Runners-Up
- National Challenge Cup: Did not enter
- CONCACAF Champions' Cup: Did not enter
- Top goalscorer: League: ( goals); All: ( goals)
- Highest home attendance: 42,385 vs. CHI (May 17)
- Lowest home attendance: 12,240 vs. FTL (June 24)
- Average home league attendance: 34,835
Home colors	Away colors

The 1981 New York Cosmos season was the 11th season for the New York Cosmos in the now-defunct North American Soccer League. Despite winning their fifth straight premiership by five points over the Chicago Sting, the Cosmos lost to the Sting in Soccer Bowl '81.

== Squad ==
Note: Flags indicate national team as defined under FIFA eligibility rules; some limited exceptions apply. Players may hold more than one non-FIFA nationality.

No.	Pos.	Nation	Player
1	GK	GER	Hubert Birkenmeier
2	DF	IRI	Andranik Eskandarian
3	DF	CAN	Robert Iarusci
4	DF	USA	Jeff Durgan
7	MF	PAR	Julio César Romero
8	MF	YUG	Vladislav Bogićević
9	FW	ITA	Giorgio Chinaglia
11	FW	POR	Seninho
12	MF	USA	Larry Hulcer
13	MF	NED	Johan Neeskens
14	FW	RSA	Steve Wegerle

No.	Pos.	Nation	Player
15	DF	NED	Wim Rijsbergen
16	FW	USA	Angelo DiBernardo
17	MF	USA	Rick Davis
18	MF	USA	Boris Bandov
19	FW	PAR	Roberto Cabañas
20	FW	BEL	François Van der Elst
21	GK	USA	David Brcic
22	DF	YUG	Ivan Buljan
24	FW	USA	Darryl Gee
25	DF	USA	Dominick Barczewski
28	FW	USA	Chico Borja

== Results ==
=== Regular season ===
Pld = Games Played, W = Wins, L = Losses, GF = Goals For, GA = Goals Against, Pts = Points
6 points for a win, 1 point for a shootout win, 0 points for a loss, 1 point for each goal scored (up to three per game).

==== Eastern Division Standings ====
Pos	Club	Pld	W	L	GF	GA	GD	Pts
1	New York Cosmos	32	23	9	80	49	+31	200
2	Montreal Manic	32	15	17	63	57	+6	141
3	Washington Diplomats	32	15	17	59	58	+1	135
4	Toronto Blizzard	32	7	25	39	82	−43	77

==== Overall League Placing ====
Pos	Club	Pld	W	L	GF	GA	GD	Pts
1	New York Cosmos	32	23	9	80	49	+31	200
2	Chicago Sting	32	23	9	84	50	+34	195
3	Vancouver Whitecaps	32	21	11	74	43	+31	186
4	San Diego Sockers	32	21	11	67	49	+18	173
5	Minnesota Kicks	32	19	13	63	57	+6	163

==== Matches ====
- March 29, 1981: New York Cosmos 3, San Jose Earthquakes 0 Spartan Stadium Attendance 20,671
- April 4, 1981: Jacksonville Tea Men 1, New York Cosmos 1 (Tea Men won in Shootout) Jacksonville, Florida Attendance 12,124
- April 12, 1981: New York Cosmos 3, Minnesota Kicks 1 Giants Stadium Attendance 40,378
- April 18, 1981: New York Cosmos 3, Dallas Tornado 0 Texas Stadium Attendance 10,181
- April 26, 1981: New York Cosmos 4, Tampa Bay Rowdies 1 Giants Stadium Attendance 40,238
- May 1, 1981: New York Cosmos 3, Atlanta Chiefs 2 Atlanta-Fulton County Stadium Attendance 9,263
- May 3, 1981: New York Cosmos 1, Washington Diplomats 0 Giants Stadium Attendance 34,189
- May 10, 1981: New York Cosmos 5, Toronto Blizzard 1 Giants Stadium Attendance 27,003
- May 15, 1981: New York Cosmos 2, Tulsa Roughnecks 1 Skelly Stadium Attendance 24,231
- May 17, 1981: Chicago Sting 3, New York Cosmos 2 Giants Stadium Attendance 42,385
- May 23, 1981: Washington Diplomats 3, New York Cosmos 2 Robert F. Kennedy Stadium Attendance 27,676
- May 25, 1981: New York Cosmos 5, Dallas Tornado 1 Giants Stadium Attendance 33,640
- May 30, 1981: Tampa Bay Rowdies 2, New York Cosmos 1 Tampa Stadium Attendance 36,765
- June 2, 1981: New York Cosmos 2, Montreal Manic 1 Olympic Stadium Attendance 38,667
- June 7, 1981: New York Cosmos 2, Atlanta Chiefs 1 Giants Stadium Attendance 31,452
- June 10, 1981: New York Cosmos 2, Fort Lauderdale Strikers 1 Lockhart Stadium Attendance 18,089
- June 14, 1981: New York Cosmos 4, Toronto Blizzard 3 Giants Stadium Attendance 31,210
- June 17, 1981: New York Cosmos 2, Washington Diplomats 1 Robert F. Kennedy Stadium Attendance 36,875
- June 21, 1981: New York Cosmos 3, Los Angeles Aztecs 0 Giants Stadium Attendance 38,362
- June 24, 1981: New York Cosmos 2, Fort Lauderdale Strikers 0 Giants Stadium Attendance 12,240
- June 28, 1981: Chicago Sting 5, New York Cosmos 5 (Sting Won in Shootout) Wrigley Field Attendance 35,501
- July 5, 1981: New York Cosmos 3, Tulsa Roughnecks 2 Giants Stadium Attendance 33,673
- July 8, 1981: New York Cosmos 2, Toronto Blizzard 1 Varsity Stadium Attendance 17,642
- July 22, 1981: New York Cosmos 4, Montreal Manic 4 (Cosmos Won in Shootout) Giants stadium Attendance 27,331
- July 25, 1981: New York Cosmos 2, Montreal Manic 1 Olympic Stadium Attendance 40,118
- July 29, 1981: New York Cosmos 2, Portland Timbers 0 Giants Stadium Attendance 28,640
- August 2, 1981: Jacksonville Tea Men 2, New York Cosmos 1 Giants Stadium Attendance 36,408
- August 5, 1981: Minnesota Kicks 2, New York Cosmos 1 Metropolitan Stadium Attendance 28,609
- August 9, 1981: Edmonton Drillers 2, New York Cosmos 0 Edmonton Commonwealth Stadium Attendance 14,781
- August 12, 1981: New York Cosmos 4, Washington Diplomats 2 Giants Stadium Attendance 34,884
- August 16, 1981: New York Cosmos 2, Montreal Manic 1 Giants Stadium Attendance 38,123
- August 19, 1981: New York Cosmos 1, Toronto Blizzard 1 (Blizzard Won in Shootout) Varsity Stadium Attendance 12,367

=== Postseason ===
==== Overview ====
===== First round =====
			Game 1	Game 2	Game 3
Tulsa Roughnecks	–	Minnesota Kicks	1–3	0–1		August 22, 26
Portland Timbers	–	San Diego Sockers	2–1	1–5	0–2	August 22, 26, 30
Jacksonville Tea Men	–	Atlanta Chiefs	3–2	2–1		August 23, 25
Calgary Boomers	–	Fort Lauderdale Strikers	1–3	0–2		August 23, 26
Tampa Bay Rowdies	–	Vancouver Whitecaps	4–1	1–0		August 23, 26
Seattle Sounders	–	Chicago Sting	2–3	2–0	2–3	August 22, 26, 30
Montreal Manic	–	Los Angeles Aztecs	5–3	2–3	2–1	August 24, 27, 30

===== Quarter-finals =====
			Game 1	Game 2	Game 3
Tampa Bay Rowdies	–	New York Cosmos	3–6	3–2	0–2	September 2, 5, 9
Montreal Manic	–	Chicago Sting	3–2	2–4	2–4	September 2, 5, 10
Fort Lauderdale Strikers	–	Minnesota Kicks	3–1	3–0		September 2, 6
Jacksonville Tea Men	–	San Diego Sockers	2–1	1–2	1–3	September 2, 6, 9

===== Semi-finals =====
			Game 1	Game 2	Game 3
Fort Lauderdale Strikers	–	New York Cosmos	3–4	1–4		September 12, 16
San Diego Sockers	–	Chicago Sting	2–1	1–2	0–1	September 12, 16, 21

===== Soccer Bowl '81 =====
September 26	Chicago Sting	1–0	New York Cosmos	Toronto, Exhibition Stadium

=== Friendlies ===
Date	Opponent	Venue	Result	Attendance	Scorer
February 1	(Switzerland) FC Birsfelden	N (Note: Held in Bahamas.)	9–0	n/a	Chinaglia (5), Van der Elst (3), Romero
February 16	(Argentina) Deportivo Morón	A	2–2	25,000	Chinaglia (2)
February 21	(Argentina) Cipolletti	A	4–1	8,000	Chinaglia (2), Borja, Cabañas
February 21	(Argentina) Boca Juniors (B)	A	9–1	10,000	Chinaglia (4), Romero (4), Bogićević
February 25	(Chile) Colo Colo	A	0–1	45,000	–
March 3	(Uruguay) Peñarol	A	4–3	40,000	Chinaglia (3), Romero
March 5	(Brazil) São Paulo	A	1–3	50,000	Chinaglia
March 8	Paraguay	A	5–2	45,000	Romero (2), Seninho (2), Chinaglia
March 11	(Mexico) Guadalajara	A	0–1	45,000	–
March 15	(Mexico) América	A	2–4	105,000	Chinaglia, Van der Elst
March 17	El Salvador	A	5–1	31,209	Chinaglia (2), Seninho (2), Cabañas
March 19	(United States) Los Angeles Aztecs	A	1–0	3,534	Cabañas
May 20	(Belgium) Anderlecht	H	1–2	30,512	Van der Elst
June 4	(Brazil) São Paulo	A	2–2	53,617	Chinaglia, DiBernardo
July 1	Greece	H	2–0	42,318	Cabañas, Chinaglia
July 12	(Scotland) Celtic	H	2–0	29,215	Romero, Durgari
July 15	(England) Southampton	H	2–1	29,614	Bogićević, Romero
July 19	(United States) Seattle Sounders	H	3–3	40,724	Chinaglia (2), Van der Elst
August 30	(Brazil) Grêmio	H	1–3	30,523	Chinaglia
October 4	Canada	A	1–1	3,000	Van der Elst
October 7	Canada	A	0–4	10,688	–
October 10	(Iceland) Valur	A	6–2	10,500	Chinaglia (3), Bogićević (2), Romero
October 13	(Germany) Borussia Dortmund	A	2–4	10,000	Davis, Chinaglia
October 18	(Italy) Milan	H	1–1	6,000	Chinaglia

== See also ==
- 1981 North American Soccer League season
