= Helenio Herrera (footballer, born 1952) =

Spanish footballer

Personal information
- Full name: Helenio Angel Herrera
- Date of birth: 27 January 1952 (age 74)
- Place of birth: Madrid, Spain
- Height: 5 ft 10 in (1.78 m)
- Position: Forward

Youth career
- Roma
- Real Madrid

Senior career*
Years	Team	Apps	(Gls)
1972	New York Cosmos	1	(0)
Total		1	(0)
- * Club domestic league appearances and goals

Helenio Angel Herrera (born 27 January 1952), is a retired Spanish footballer who played as a forward.

== Club career ==
Herrera signed for the New York Cosmos in 1972 from Spanish giants Real Madrid.

== Personal life ==
Herrera is the son of legendary football manager of the same name, Helenio Herrera.

== Career statistics ==
=== Club ===
Club	Season	League			Cup		Other		Total	
Club	Season	Division	Apps	Goals	Apps	Goals	Apps	Goals	Apps	Goals
New York Cosmos	1972	NASL	1	0	0	0	0	0	1	0
Career total			1	0	0	0	0	0	1	0
