= Johan Neeskens =

Dutch football manager and player (1951–2024)

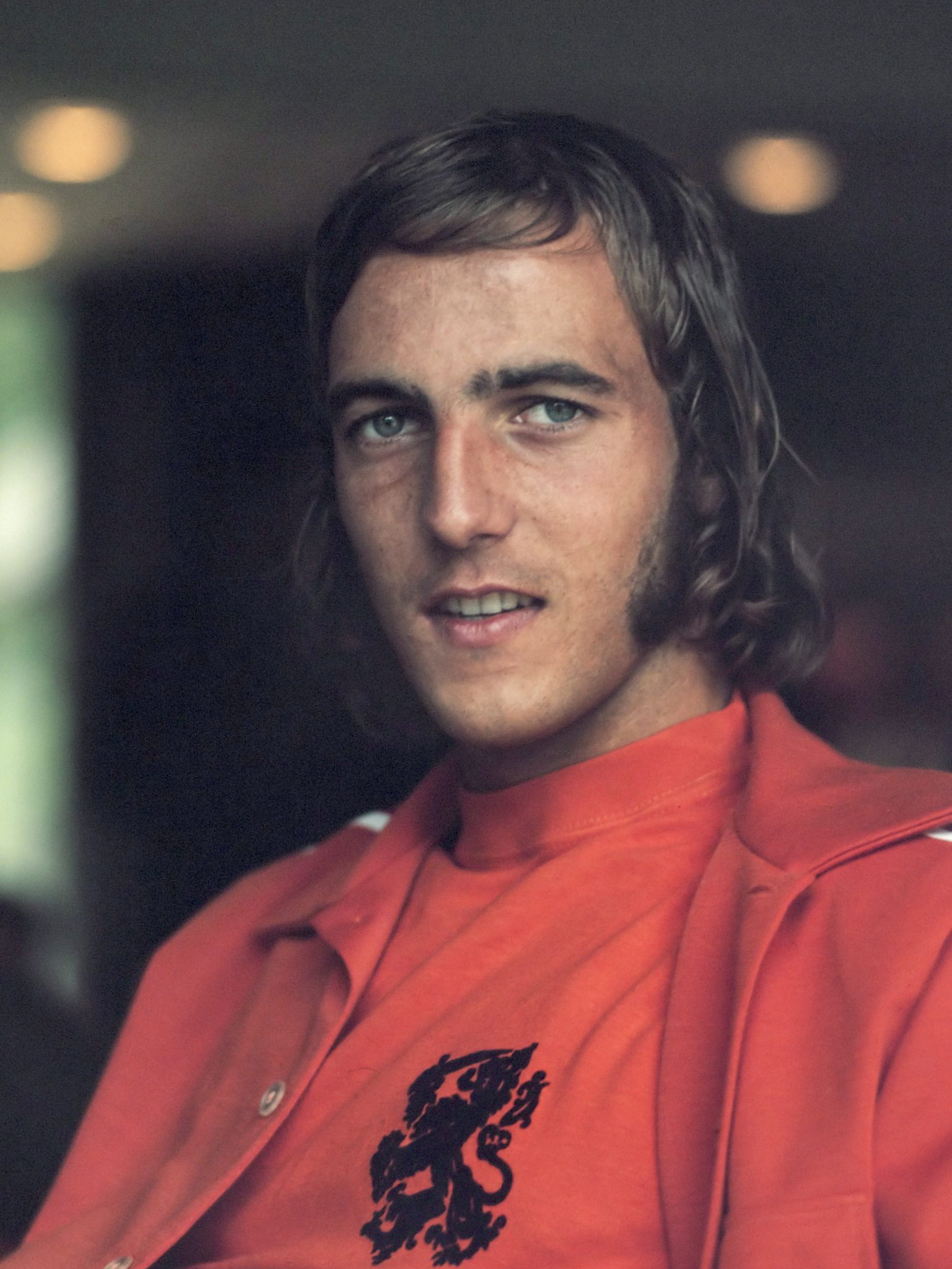
- Neeskens with the Netherlands in 1974

Personal information
- Full name: Johannes Jacobus Neeskens
- Date of birth: 15 September 1951
- Place of birth: Heemstede, Netherlands
- Date of death: 6 October 2024 (aged 73)
- Place of death: Algeria
- Height: 1.78 m (5 ft 10 in)
- Position: Midfielder

Senior career*
Years	Team	Apps	(Gls)
1968–1970	RCH	68	(1)
1970–1974	Ajax	124	(33)
1974–1979	Barcelona	140	(35)
1979–1984	New York Cosmos	94	(17)
1985	Groningen	7	(0)
1985	South Florida Sun	1	(1)
1985–1986	Kansas City Comets (indoor)	23	(1)
1986–1987	Löwenbrau (amateurs)		
1988–1990	Baar	23	(5)
1991	FC Zug	1	(0)

International career
1970–1981	Netherlands	49	(17)

Managerial career
- 1991–1993: FC Zug
- 1993–1995: Stäfa
- 1995–1996: Singen
- 1995–2000: Netherlands (assistant manager)
- 2000–2004: NEC
- 2005–2006: Australia (assistant manager)
- 2006–2008: Barcelona (assistant manager)
- 2008–2009: Netherlands B
- 2009–2010: Galatasaray (assistant manager)
- 2011–2012: Mamelodi Sundowns
Medal record
Men's football
Representing Netherlands
FIFA World Cup
Runner-up	1974 West Germany
Runner-up	1978 Argentina
UEFA European Championship
Third place	1976 Yugoslavia
- * Club domestic league appearances and goals

Johannes Jacobus Neeskens (Dutch pronunciation: [ˈjoːɦɑ ˈneːskəns]; 15 September 1951 – 6 October 2024) was a Dutch football manager and player. A midfielder, he was an important member of the Netherlands national team that finished as runners-up in the 1974 and 1978 FIFA World Cups and is considered one of the greatest midfielders of all time. In 2004, he was named one of the 125 Greatest Living Footballers at a FIFA Awards Ceremony, while in 2017 he was included in the FourFourTwo list of the 100 all-time greatest players, at the 64th position.

After his retirement in 1991, Neeskens was assistant manager to Guus Hiddink with the Dutch and Australian national teams, and to Frank Rijkaard for the Netherlands, Barcelona and Galatasaray. He was also head coach of NEC Nijmegen, the Netherlands B national team, and Mamelodi Sundowns.

== Early life ==
Neeskens was born in Heemstede in North Holland on 15 September 1951. His childhood was marked by his parents' divorce, and he slept in a corridor due to lack of space.

Neeskens was gifted at sports as a child, including gymnastics and baseball. He represented the Netherlands at a youth European Championship in the latter sport.

== Club career ==
Neeskens started his career at Racing Club Heemstede in 1968, before being spotted by Rinus Michels and signed for Ajax in 1970. The youngster impressed at right-back, playing in that position for Ajax in the 1971 European Cup Final win against Panathinaikos. During the 1971–72 season, Neeskens took up more of a central midfield role, in support of Johan Cruyff. He adapted well to his new central midfield role because he was a tireless runner, had great technical skills and scored his fair share of goals. Ajax completed a hat-trick of European Cup wins between 1971 and 1973, and Neeskens moved on to FC Barcelona in 1974 to join Cruyff and Michels. There he was nicknamed Johan Segon (Johan the Second).

While his time at Barcelona was relatively unsuccessful for the club (one cup title in 1978, and the 1979 Cup Winners' Cup), he was hugely popular amongst the fans. In 1979 he accepted an offer from the New York Cosmos, spending five years at the club. He earned the equivalent of 600,000 Dutch guilders (roughly $300,000) per year at the club. Having been absent without reason for the third time, he was given a nine-month suspension by manager Hennes Weisweiler in late 1980. The Cosmos released him in October 1984. He also played for FC Groningen during the 1984–85 season. In June 1985, he signed with the South Florida Sun of the United Soccer League. The USL collapsed six games into the 1985 season. On 15 August 1985, he signed with the Kansas City Comets of the Major Indoor Soccer League.

Neeskens then played for FC Baar (1988–90) and FC Zug in Switzerland, finally retiring in 1991.

== International career ==
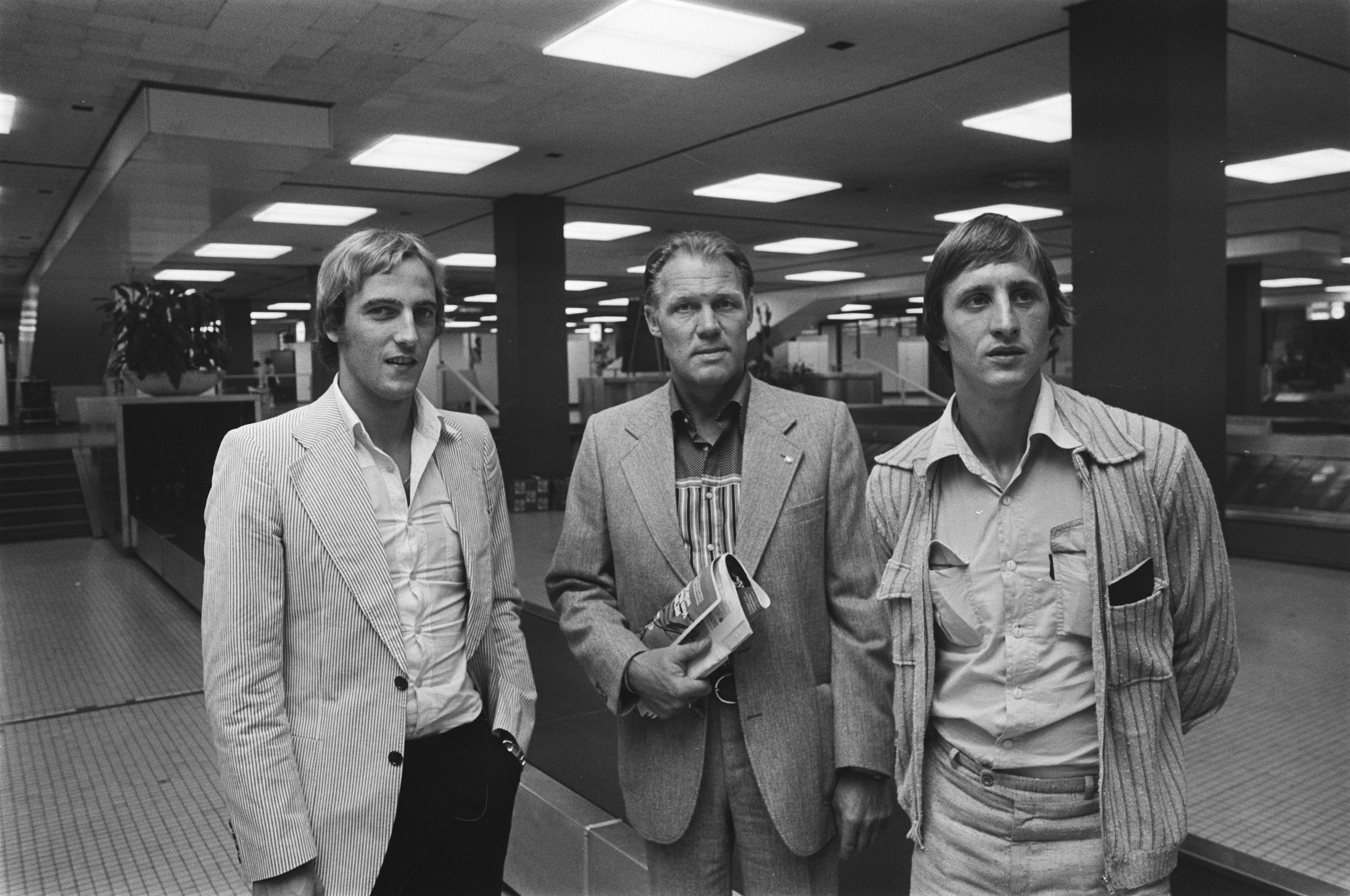
Three of the most notable figures of the Totaalvoetbal school: Johan Neeskens, Rinus Michels and Johan Cruyff in 1976

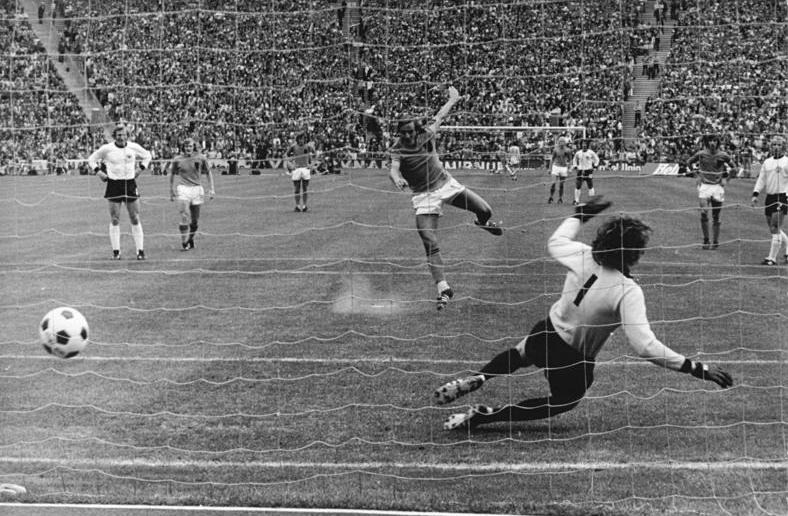
Neeskens scoring the opening goal in the 1974 World Cup final against West Germany

Neeskens was capped 49 times for the Netherlands national team, scoring 17 goals. He made his debut against East Germany in 1970, and played a crucial role in the 1974 and 1978 FIFA World Cups, playing in central midfield.

In 1974 World Cup qualification, Neeskens scored a hat-trick in a 9–0 win over Norway and also neutralised the attacking threat of Paul Van Himst against Belgium; the latter performance was criticised as a "disgrace" in Dutch newspaper de Volkskrant for having committed 13 fouls. At the tournament in West Germany, he scored two penalties against Bulgaria, and a goal in a 2–0 win over reigning champions Brazil to put the Netherlands into the final. Neeskens scored the opening goal of the 1974 World Cup final against West Germany with a penalty kick after only two minutes of play.

Four years later, Neeskens was a crucial player for the Netherlands (despite a rib injury suffered in the Scotland defeat), in the absence of Cruyff who had retired from international football in 1977. The Netherlands again reached the final, only to lose again to the host nation, this time Argentina, going down 3–1 after extra time (the score at the end of regulation was 1–1).

Neeskens's international appearances were fewer in number after he moved to the New York Cosmos. He declined the key UEFA Euro 1980 qualifier against East Germany in November 1979, citing physical and emotional exhaustion. After his nine-month ban for club absences was lifted, he was reintroduced to the national squad by manager Kees Rijvers in late 1981 for two qualifiers to the 1982 FIFA World Cup. He was cheered in a 3–0 home win over Belgium, but the team lost 2–0 away to France in his final game and missed out on the final tournament.

== Coaching career ==
Guus Hiddink appointed Neeskens as assistant coach for the Netherlands in 1995. They led the team at the 1998 FIFA World Cup. He remained in the role under successor Frank Rijkaard, who led the national team in its co-hosting of Euro 2000. In 2000 he was appointed coach of Dutch side NEC Nijmegen, leading them to their first European appearance in twenty years in 2003, but was fired in December 2004 with the team in 14th place.

In December 2005, Neeskens was appointed assistant coach of the Australia national team, once again at the request of Guus Hiddink, the Socceroos's manager. He worked alongside Hiddink and Graham Arnold as part of their World Cup 2006 campaign, and was desired by Football Australia to replace Russia-bound Hiddink after the tournament.

After the 2006 World Cup, Neeskens returned to FC Barcelona to replace Henk ten Cate in the club's technical staff, reuniting with Rijkaard. In May 2008, Rijkaard was dismissed with one year remaining of his contract after finishing third in La Liga, with his assistants Neeskens and Eusebio Sacristán leaving with him.

Neeskens joined Frank Rijkaard at Galatasaray as his assistant manager in 2009, and left the club alongside Rijkaard in October 2010. He became the coach of South African club Mamelodi Sundowns in 2011. He was sacked in December 2012 with the team second from bottom after 12 games and having lost the League Cup final to Bloemfontein Celtic.

== Style of play ==
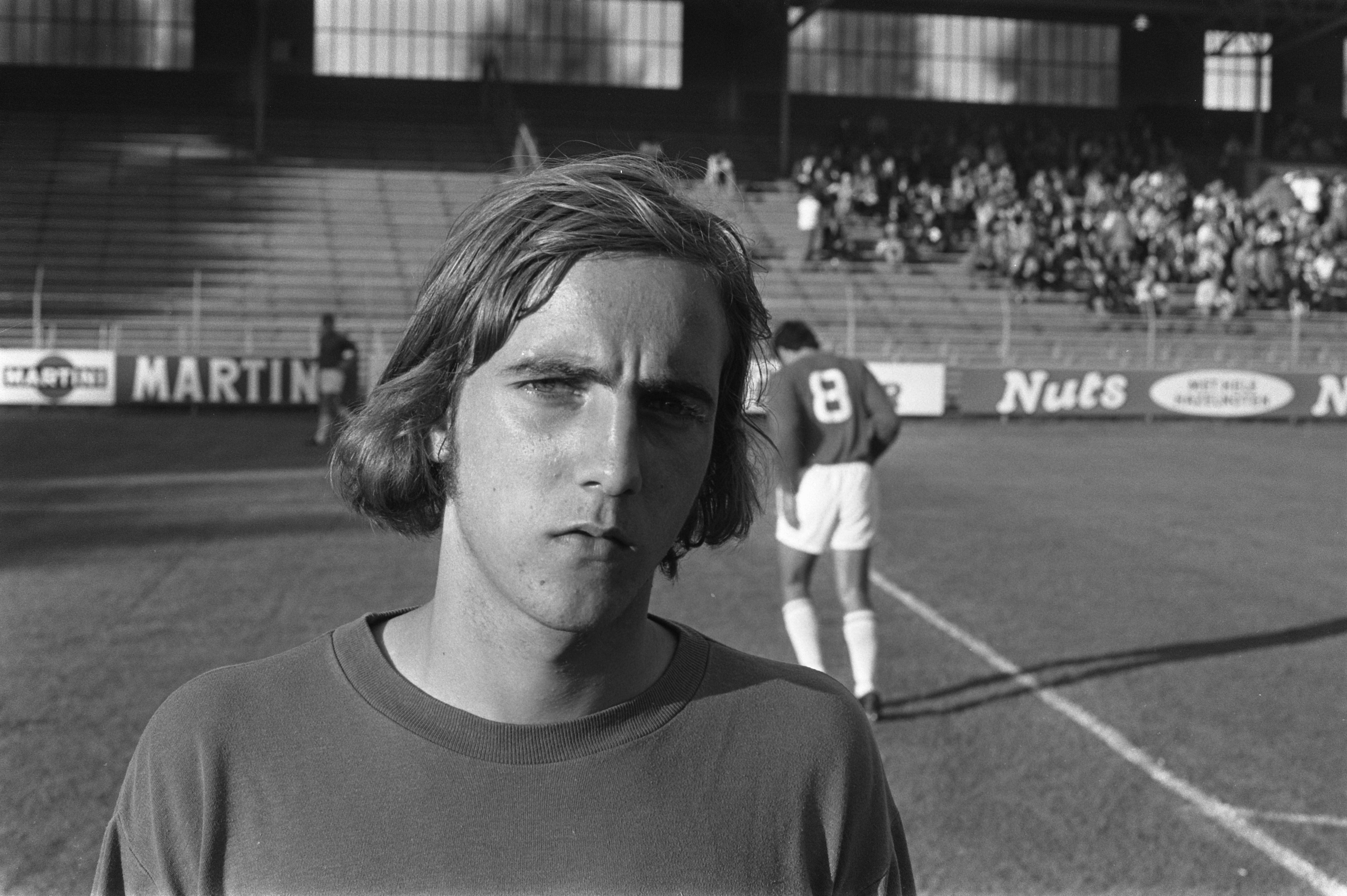
Neeskens in 1970, before a friendly game between Ajax and Standard Liège

Speaking of Neeskens, the UEFA website stated that the "steel-hard midfielder was a tireless runner yet also had nice technique and scored goals, helping to set the stage for Cruyff to shine. A box-to-box midfielder with incredible stamina, great mentality, and a powerful shot, Neeskens excelled at pressuring opponents to regain possession. "He was worth two men in midfield," said teammate Sjaak Swart."

Neeskens had begun his career as a right-back for Heemstede, but was moved into midfield by Ajax manager Ștefan Kovács. He played in the Total Football team designed by Kovács's predecessor Rinus Michels, in which players were expected to change position fluidly.

== Personal life and death ==
Neeskens was married twice: to Marianne Schiphof in 1974 with whom he had a son, and to Swiss-born Marlis von Reding in 1985, with whom he had two daughters and a son. With another woman he also had a son, John, whom he never publicly acknowledged and who also became a professional footballer.

Neeskens died while in Algeria on 6 October 2024, at the age of 73. He was in the country as part of a KNVB coaching project, and had suffered a heart attack.

== Career statistics ==
=== Club ===
Appearances and goals by club, season and competition
Club	Season	League			National cup		League cup		Continental		Other		Total	
Club	Season	Division	Apps	Goals	Apps	Goals	Apps	Goals	Apps	Goals	Apps	Goals	Apps	Goals
RCH	1968–69	Eerste Divisie	34	0	1	0	–		–		–		35	0
RCH	1969–70	Eerste Divisie	34	1	1	0	–		–		–		35	1
RCH	Total		68	1	2	0	0	0	0	0	0	0	70	1
Ajax	1970–71	Eredivisie	33	1	6	2	–		9 (Note: Appearances in UEFA European Cup)	2	–		48	5
Ajax	1971–72	Eredivisie	28	10	5	2	–		8	0	–		41	12
Ajax	1972–73	Eredivisie	32	7	1	0	–		7	0	3 (Note: One appearance in UEFA Super Cup; two appearance, one goal in Intercontinental Cup)	1	43	8
Ajax	1973–74	Eredivisie	31	14	4	0	–		2	0	2 (Note: Appearances in UEFA Super Cup)	1	37	15
Ajax	Total		124	32	16	4	0	0	24	2	5	2	169	40
Barcelona	1974–75	La Liga	27	7	0	0	–		7	1	–		34	8
Barcelona	1975–76	La Liga	32	12	0	0	–		9 (Note: Appearances in UEFA Cup)	6	–		41	18
Barcelona	1976–77	La Liga	33	8	0	0	–		8	1	–		41	9
Barcelona	1977–78	La Liga	18	2	2	0	–		7	1	–		27	3
Barcelona	1978–79	La Liga	30	6	1	0	–		9 (Note: Appearances in UEFA Cup Winners' Cup)	0	–		40	6
Barcelona	Total		140	35	3	0	0	0	40	9	0	0	183	44
New York Cosmos	1979	NASL	13	4							5	2	18	6
New York Cosmos	1980	NASL	17	4							1	0	18	4
New York Cosmos	1981	NASL	6	2							5	1	11	3
New York Cosmos	1982	NASL	17	0							1	0	18	0
New York Cosmos	1983	NASL	23	2							1	0	24	2
New York Cosmos	1984	NASL	18	5									18	5
New York Cosmos	Total		94	17							13	2	107	20
Groningen	1984–85	Eredivisie	7	0	0	0	–		0	0	–		7	0
South Florida Sun	1985	USL	1	1									1	1
Kansas City Comets	1985–86	MISL	23	1									23	1
Löwenbrau	1986–87													
Baar	1987–88		9	1									9	1
Baar	1988–89		13	4									13	4
Baar	1989–90		1	0									1	0
Baar	Total		23	5									23	5
Zug	1990–91		1	0										
Career total			450+	91+	21+	4+			64+	11+	5+	2+	553+	110+

=== International ===
Appearances and goals by national team and year
National team	Year	Apps	Goals
Netherlands	1970	2	0
Netherlands	1971	3	0
Netherlands	1972	4	5
Netherlands	1973	5	1
Netherlands	1974	13	9
Netherlands	1975	3	1
Netherlands	1976	4	1
Netherlands	1977	3	0
Netherlands	1978	8	0
Netherlands	1979	2	0
Netherlands	1980	0	0
Netherlands	1981	2	0
Total		49	17

Scores and results list the Netherlands' goal tally first, score column indicates score after each Neeskens goal.

List of international goals scored by Johan Neeskens
No.	Date	Venue	Opponent	Score	Result	Competition
1	16 February 1972	Karaiskakis Stadium, Athens, Greece	Greece	4–0	5–0	Friendly
2	30 August 1972	Stadion Letná, Prague, Czechoslovakia	Czechoslovakia	2–0	2–1	Friendly
3	1 November 1972	De Kuip, Rotterdam, Netherlands	Norway	1–0	9–0	1974 FIFA World Cup qualification
4	1 November 1972	De Kuip, Rotterdam, Netherlands	Norway	2–0	9–0	1974 FIFA World Cup qualification
5	1 November 1972	De Kuip, Rotterdam, Netherlands	Norway	4–0	9–0	1974 FIFA World Cup qualification
6	29 August 1973	De Adelaarshorst Deventer, Netherlands	Iceland	3–0	8–1	1974 FIFA World Cup qualification
7	26 May 1974	Olympisch Stadion, Amsterdam, Netherlands	Argentina	1–0	4–1	Friendly
8	23 June 1974	Westfalenstadion, Dortmund, Germany	Bulgaria	1–0	4–1	1974 FIFA World Cup Group 3
9	23 June 1974	Westfalenstadion, Dortmund, Germany	Bulgaria	2–0	4–1	1974 FIFA World Cup Group 3
10	30 June 1974	Parkstadion, Gelsenkirchen, Germany	East Germany	1–0	2–0	1974 FIFA World Cup Group A
11	3 July 1974	Westfalenstadion, Dortmund, Germany	Brazil	1–0	2–0	1974 FIFA World Cup Group A
12	7 July 1974	Olympiastadion, Munich, Germany	West Germany	1–0	1–2	1974 FIFA World Cup final
13	4 September 1974	Råsunda Stadium, Solna, Sweden	Sweden	3–0	5–1	Friendly
14	4 September 1974	Råsunda Stadium, Solna, Sweden	Sweden	4–1	5–1	Friendly
15	25 September 1974	Olympic Stadium, Helsinki, Finland	Finland	3–1	3–1	UEFA Euro 1976 qualification
16	15 October 1975	Olympisch Stadion, Amsterdam, Netherlands	Poland	1–0	3–0	UEFA Euro 1976 qualification
17	25 April 1976	De Kuip, Rotterdam, Netherlands	Belgium	4–0	5–0	UEFA Euro 1976 qualification

== Honours ==
Ajax

- Eredivisie: 1971–72, 1972–73
- KNVB Cup: 1970–71, 1971–72
- European Cup: 1970–71, 1971–72, 1972–73
- Intercontinental Cup: 1972
- European Super Cup: 1972, 1973

Barcelona

- Copa del Rey: 1977–78
- European Cup Winners' Cup: 1978–79

New York Cosmos

- North American Soccer League: 1980, 1982

Netherlands

- FIFA World Cup runner-up: 1974, 1978
- UEFA European Championship third place: 1976
- Tournoi de Paris: 1978

Individual

- FUWO European Team of the Season: 1972
- Sport Ideal European XI: 1974, 1975
- 1974 FIFA World Cup Silver Boot
- 1974 FIFA World Cup All-Star Team
- Don Balón Award (La Liga Foreign Player of the Year): 1975–76
- La Liga Team of The Year: 1976, 1977, 1979
- FIFA 100
- Ballon d'Or Dream Team (Bronze): 2020

== See also ==
- List of FIFA World Cup top goalscorers
