= 1974 FIFA World Cup qualification – UEFA Group 3 =

Group 3 consisted of four of the 32 teams entered into the European zone: Belgium, Iceland, Netherlands, and Norway. These four teams competed on a home-and-away basis for one of the 9.5 spots in the final tournament allocated to the European zone, with the group's winner claiming the place in the finals.

== Standings ==
Rank	Team	Pld	W	D	L	GF	GA	GD	Pts
1	Netherlands	6	4	2	0	24	2	+22	10
2	Belgium	6	4	2	0	12	0	+12	10
3	Norway	6	2	0	4	9	16	−7	4
4	Iceland	6	0	0	6	2	29	−27	0

== Matches ==
18 May 1972

Belgium	4–0	Iceland
Van Himst 12'; Polleunis 34', 57'; Gunnarsson 89' (o.g.)	Report

Liège, Belgium
Referee: Rasmussen (Denmark)

22 May 1972

Iceland	0–4	Belgium
	Report	Janssens 28'; Lambert 30' (pen.), 49' (pen.); Dockx 60'

Bruges, Belgium
Referee: Byrne (Republic of Ireland)

3 August 1972

Norway	4–1	Iceland
Fuglset 55' (pen.); Lund 57'; Hestad 83'; Johansen 87'	Report	Óskarsson 90'

Stavanger, Norway
Referee: Riedel (East Germany)

4 October 1972

Norway	0–2	Belgium
	Report	Dolmans 58' (pen.); Lambert 60'

Oslo, Norway
Referee: Mullan (Scotland)

1 November 1972

Netherlands	9–0	Norway
Neeskens 31', 51', 63'; Cruyff 55', 82'; De Jong 70'; Brokamp 76', 87'; Keizer 80' (pen.)	Report

Rotterdam, Netherlands
Referee: Eksztajn (Poland)

19 November 1972

Belgium	0–0	Netherlands
	Report

Antwerp, Belgium
Referee: Walker (England)

2 August 1973

Iceland	0–4	Norway
	Report	Sunde 40'; Johansen 55', 87'; Pettersen 80'

Reykjavík, Iceland
Referee: Dahlberg (Sweden)

22 August 1973

Netherlands	5–0	Iceland
Van Hanegem 6'; Cruyff 8', 57'; Haan 17'; Brokamp 29'	Report

Amsterdam, Netherlands
Referee: Coiling (Luxembourg)

29 August 1973

Iceland	1–8	Netherlands
E. Geirsson 44'	Report	Brokamp 15', 75'; Cruyff 21', 28'; Neeskens 24'; Van de Kerkhof 46'; Schneider 48' (pen.); Van Hanegem 71'

Deventer, Netherlands
Referee: Hirviniemi (Finland)

12 September 1973

Norway	1–2	Netherlands
Hestad 77'	Report	Cruyff 7'; Hulshoff 87'

Oslo, Norway
Referee: Wright (Northern Ireland)

31 October 1973

Belgium	2–0	Norway
Dolmans 32' (pen.); Lambert 85' (pen.)	Report

Brussels, Belgium
Referee: Jursa (Czechoslovakia)

18 November 1973

Netherlands	0–0	Belgium
	Report

Amsterdam, Netherlands
Referee: Kazakov (Soviet Union)
