= 1973 New York Cosmos season =

New York Cosmos
1973 season
- Manager: Gordon Bradley
- Stadium: Hofstra Stadium
- NASL: Division: 2nd Overall: 3rd Playoffs: Semifinal
- National Challenge Cup: Did not enter
- CONCACAF Champions' Cup: Did not enter
- Top goalscorer: League: (United States) Joey Fink (10 goals); All: (United States) Joey Fink (11 goals)
- Highest home attendance: 9,075 (May 6 vs. Rochester)
- Lowest home attendance: All: 2,364 (May 20 vs. Finn Harps); League: 3,920 (May 26 vs. Atlanta)
- Average home league attendance: 5,782

The 1973 New York Cosmos season was the third season for the New York Cosmos in the now-defunct North American Soccer League. In the Cosmos' third year of existence, the club finished 2nd in the Eastern Division and 3rd in the overall league table. In the playoffs, the Cosmos were defeated in their semifinal match by the Dallas Tornado.

== Squad ==
Note: Flags indicate national team as defined under FIFA eligibility rules; some limited exceptions apply. Players may hold more than one non-FIFA nationality.

| No. | Pos. | Nation | Player |
|---|---|---|---|
| 0 | GK | POL | Jerry Sularz |
| 1 | GK | USA | Shep Messing |
| 2 | DF | USA | Barry Mahy |
| 2 | DF | ISR | Karol Rotner |
| 3 | FW | USA | Henry McCully |
| 4 | DF | USA | Werner Roth |
| 6 | MF | CAN | John Kerr, Sr. |
| 7 | FW | NIR | Mickey Niblock |
| 8 | FW | ISR | Roby Young |
| 9 | | USA | Paul LeSueur |
| 10 | FW | TCH | Josef Jelinek |
| 11 | FW | USA | Jorge Siega |

| No. | Pos. | Nation | Player |
|---|---|---|---|
| 12 | FW | USA | Joey Fink |
| 14 | DF | USA | Ralph Wright |
| 15 | MF | USA | Siegfried Stritzl |
| 16 | FW | BER | Randy Horton |
| 18 | FW | CAN | Tibor Vigh |
| 19 | DF | POL | Karol Kapcinski |
| 20 | MF | TRI | Everald Cummings |
| 22 | MF | POL | Dieter Zajdel |
| 23 | DF | USA | Len Renery |
| 24 | DF | USA | Gordon Bradley |
| 5,8 | DF | ENG | Malcolm Dawes |
| — | FW | USA | Charlie McCully |

== Results ==
=== Preseason ===
| Date | Opponent | Venue | Result | Attendance | Scorers |
|---|---|---|---|---|---|
| April 23, 1973 | Club América | A | 2-1 | 35,000 | Vigh |
| April 26, 1973 | Veracruz | A | 1-0 | N/A | |

=== Regular season ===
Pld = Games Played, W = Wins, L = Losses, D = Draws, GF = Goals For, GA = Goals Against, Pts = Points
6 points for a win, 3 points for a draw, 0 points for a loss, 1 point for each goal scored (up to three per game).

==== Eastern Division Standings ====
| Pos | Club | Pld | W | L | D | GF | GA | GD | Pts |
|---|---|---|---|---|---|---|---|---|---|
| 1 | Philadelphia Atoms | 19 | 9 | 2 | 8 | 29 | 14 | +15 | 104 |
| 2 | New York Cosmos | 19 | 7 | 5 | 7 | 31 | 23 | +8 | 91 |
| 3 | Miami Toros | 19 | 8 | 5 | 6 | 26 | 21 | +5 | 88 |

==== Overall League Placing ====
| Pos | Club | Pld | W | L | D | GF | GA | GD | Pts |
|---|---|---|---|---|---|---|---|---|---|
| 1 | Dallas Tornado | 19 | 11 | 4 | 4 | 36 | 25 | +11 | 111 |
| 2 | Philadelphia Atoms | 19 | 9 | 2 | 8 | 29 | 14 | +15 | 104 |
| 3 | New York Cosmos | 19 | 7 | 5 | 7 | 31 | 23 | +8 | 91 |
| 4 | Toronto Metros | 19 | 6 | 4 | 9 | 32 | 18 | +14 | 89 |
| 5 | Miami Toros | 19 | 8 | 5 | 6 | 26 | 21 | +5 | 88 |

==== Matches ====
| Date | Opponent | Venue | Result | Attendance | Scorers |
|---|---|---|---|---|---|
| May 6, 1973 | Rochester Lancers | H | 1-0 | 9,075 | Siega |
| May 13, 1973 | Toronto Metros | A | 1-1 | 6,862 | Horton |
| May 16, 1973 | Miami Toros | H | 1-1 | 5,301 | Horton |
| May 26, 1973 | Atlanta Apollos | H | 5-0 | 3,920 | Fink (3), Jelinek, Horton |
| June 2, 1973 | St. Louis Stars | H | 1-1 | 5,535 | Fink |
| June 6, 1973 | Philadelphia Atoms | A | 1-1 | 9,168 | Renery |
| June 8, 1973 | Rochester Lancers | A | 2-1 | 4,553 | Zajdel |
| June 17, 1973 | Montreal Olympique | H | 2-0 | 5,305 | Jelinek, Horton |
| June 27, 1973 | St. Louis Stars | A | 2-1 | 4,517 | Fink |
| June 30, 1973 | Miami Toros | A | 2-1 | 4,425 | Horton |
| July 4, 1973 | Philadelphia Atoms | A | 2-1 | 12,128 | Horton |
| July 7, 1973 | Toronto Metros | H | 3-2 | 4,011 | Wright, Fink (2) |
| July 14, 1973 | Philadelphia Atoms | H | 1-1 | 6,100 | Fink |
| July 27, 1973 | Atlanta Apollos | A | 1-3 | 2,671 | Fink (2), Cummings |
| July 28, 1973 | Miami Toros | H | 1-0 | 4,520 | Fink |
| August 4, 1973 | Dallas Tornado | A | 2-1 | 5,359 | Horton |
| August 9, 1973 | Montreal Olympique | A | 0-0 | 1,100 | |
| August 11, 1973 | Dallas Tornado | H | 4-3 | 7,250 | Horton, Siega, Kapcinski, Young |

=== Postseason ===
==== Overview ====
===== Semi-finals =====
| August 15 | New York Cosmos | 0–1 | Dallas Tornado | Irving, Texas Stadium |

| August 18 | Toronto Metros | 0–3 | Philadelphia Atoms | Philadelphia, Veterans Stadium |

===== Final =====
| August 25 | Philadelphia Atoms | 2–0 | Dallas Tornado | Irving, Texas Stadium |

==== Matches ====
| Date | Opponent | Venue | Result | Attendance | Scorers | Ref. |
|---|---|---|---|---|---|---|
| August 15, 1973 | Dallas Tornado | A | 1-0 | 9,009 | | |

=== Friendlies ===
| Date | Opponent | Venue | Result | Att. | Scorers | Ref. |
|---|---|---|---|---|---|---|
| Apr 23 | (Mexico) América | A | 1–2 | 35,000 | Vigh | |
| Apr 26 | (Mexico) Veracruz | A | 0–1 | 6,805 | – | |
| May 20 | (Republic of Ireland) Finn Harps | H | 1–1 | 2,364 | Siega | |
| June 24 | (Mexico) Veracruz | H | 2–2 | 6,805 | Strintzl, Horton | |
| August 18 | (Soviet Union) Torpedo Moscow | H | 2–2 | 7,763 | Niblock, Horton | |

== See also ==
- 1973 North American Soccer League season
