= Malcolm Dawes =

English footballer (1944–2026)

Personal information
- Date of birth: 3 March 1944
- Place of birth: Trimdon, England
- Date of death: 9 September 2026 (aged 82)
- Position: Defender

Senior career*
| Years | Team | Apps | (Gls) |
| 1965–1969 | Aldershot | 176 | (2) |
| 1970–1975 | Hartlepool | 213 | (12) |
| 1973–1974 | New York Cosmos | 35 | (2) |
| 1974–1975 | Denver Dynamos | 19 | (2) |
| 1975–1977 | Workington | 51 | (1) |
- * Club domestic league appearances and goals

Malcolm Dawes (3 March 1944 – 9 September 2026) was an English professional footballer. A defender, he made his senior professional debut on 19 August 1970. Dawes played professional football for Aldershot, Hartlepool, New York Cosmos, Denver Dynamos in the US, and his last club Workington.

== Career ==
Dawes made his debut for Hartlepool on 19 August 1970 against York City in the League Cup. He went on to play 213 games scoring 12 goals. Dawes played his final game for Hartlepool against AFC Bournemouth on 16 August 1975 in the League. He was sent off once in his career, receiving a Red Card for violent conduct for punching Stan Bowles.

Dawes left the New York Cosmos in 1974 after playing for two seasons and joined the Denver Dynamos. Just as Dawes left New York Cosmos Pelé signed. Dawes wore the number 6 shirt whilst at New York Cosmos once he had departed Franz Beckenbauer signed as his replacement took the number 6 shirt.

Dawes joined the Denver Dynamos from New York Cosmos in 1974 and played 19 games scoring 2 goals.

== Later life and death ==
Dawes performed the role of Community & Youth Development Officer for Newton Aycliffe Cricket Club and also played an active role in the Sedgefield District Cricket Development Group.

Dawes died from complications with his heart on 9 September 2026, aged 82.
