= 1972 New York Cosmos season =

New York Cosmos
1972 season
- Manager: Gordon Bradley
- Stadium: Hofstra Stadium
- NASL: Division: 1st Overall: 1st Playoffs: Champions
- National Challenge Cup: Did not enter
- Top goalscorer: League: Randy Horton (9 goals); All: Randy Horton (13 goals)
- Highest home attendance: All: 13,205 (Aug. 30 vs. Dynamo Moscow); League: 7,324 (May 7 vs. St. Louis)
- Lowest home attendance: 1,200 (Jun. 18 vs. Toronto)
- Average home league attendance: 4,282
Home colors

The 1972 New York Cosmos season was the second season for the New York Cosmos in the now-defunct North American Soccer League. In the Cosmos' second year of existence, the club finished 1st in the Northern Division and 1st in the overall league table. In the playoffs, the Cosmos defeated the Dallas Tornado in the semifinal and the St. Louis Stars in the final, winning their first league championship and completing the first double by a club in the national era.

== Squad ==
Note: Flags indicate national team as defined under FIFA eligibility rules; some limited exceptions apply. Players may hold more than one non-FIFA nationality.

No.	Pos.	Nation	Player
0	GK	ENG	Richard Blackmore
1	GK	GHA	Emmanuel Kofie
2	DF	USA	Barry Mahy
3	DF	USA	Charlie McCully
4	DF	USA	Werner Roth
5	DF	GER	Robert Neubauer
6	MF	CAN	John Kerr, Sr.
7	FW	BRA	Cinesinho
8	FW	ISR	Roby Young
9	FW	ESP	Helenio Herrera
9		USA	Paul LeSueur

No.	Pos.	Nation	Player
10	FW	TCH	Josef Jelinek
11	FW	USA	Jorge Siega
14	MF	USA	Stan Startzell
15	MF	USA	Siegfried Stritzl
16	FW	BER	Randy Horton
17	FW	GHA	Wilberforce Mfum
19	DF	POL	Karol Kapcinski
20	MF	TRI	Everald Cummings
22	MF	POL	Dieter Zajdel
24	DF	USA	Gordon Bradley

== Results ==
=== Regular season ===
Pld = Games Played, W = Wins, L = Losses, D = Draws, GF = Goals For, GA = Goals Against, Pts = Points
6 points for a win, 3 points for a draw, 0 points for a loss, 1 point for each goal scored (up to three per game).

==== Northern Division Standings ====
Pos	Club	Pld	W	L	D	GF	GA	GD	Pts
1	New York Cosmos	14	7	3	4	28	16	+12	77
2	Rochester Lancers	14	6	5	3	20	22	-2	64
3	Montreal Olympique	14	4	5	5	19	20	-1	57
4	Toronto Metros	14	4	6	4	18	22	-4	53

==== Overall League Placing ====
Pos	Club	Pld	W	L	D	GF	GA	GD	Pts
1	New York Cosmos	14	7	3	4	28	16	+12	77
2	St. Louis Stars	14	7	4	3	20	14	+6	69
3	Rochester Lancers	14	6	5	3	20	22	-2	64
4	Dallas Tornado	14	6	5	3	15	12	+3	60
5	Montreal Olympique	14	4	5	5	19	20	-1	57

==== Matches ====
Date	Opponent	Venue	Result	Attendance	Scorers
May 7, 1972	St. Louis Stars	H	3-3	7,324	Young, Horton (2)
May 14, 1972	Rochester Lancers	A	1-1	4,100	Stritzl
May 20, 1972	Miami Gatos	H	6-1	1,302	Horton (2), Cummings (2), Jelinek, Siega
May 27, 1972	Atlanta Chiefs	H	4-2	4,445	Kerr, Horton (2), Cummings
June 3, 1972	Dallas Tornado	A	1-0	2,157	
June 18, 1972	Toronto Metros	H	2-1	1,200	Cummings, Siega
June 25, 1972	Atlanta Chiefs	A	2-0	N/A	
July 1, 1972	Montreal Olympique	H	2-0	4,571	Kerr, Mfum
July 8, 1972	Miami Gatos	A	0-2	1,438	Horton, Mfum
July 16, 1972	Montreal Olympique	A	2-2	2,996	Mfum, Cummings
July 22, 1972	Dallas Tornado	H	1-0	6,518	Mfum
July 29, 1972	St. Louis Stars	A	1-0	4,385	
August 6, 1972	Toronto Metros	A	1-1	1,255	Horton
August 12, 1972	Rochester Lancers	H	4-1	4,616	Mfum, Horton, Jelinek, Kerr

=== Postseason ===
==== Overview ====
===== Semi-finals =====
August 15	Rochester Lancers	0–2	St. Louis Stars	St. Louis, Busch Memorial

August 19	Dallas Tornado	0–1	New York Cosmos	New York, Hofstra Stadium

===== Final =====
August 26	St. Louis Stars	1–2	New York Cosmos	New York, Hofstra Stadium

==== Matches ====
Date	Opponent	Venue	Result	Attendance	Scorers
August 19, 1972	Dallas Tornado	H	1-0	5,026	Kerr
August 26, 1972	St. Louis Stars	H	2-1	6,102	Jelinek, Horton

=== Friendlies ===
Date	Opponent	Venue	Result	Attendance	Scorers
July 31	(England) Birmingham City	H	0-3	N/A	
August 16	(Israel) Maccabi Tel Aviv	H	5-2	5,126	Horton (3), Kerr, Stritzl
August 30	(Soviet Union) Dynamo Moscow	H	1-2	13,205	Zajdel

== See also ==
- 1972 North American Soccer League season
