= Steve Moyers =

American soccer player

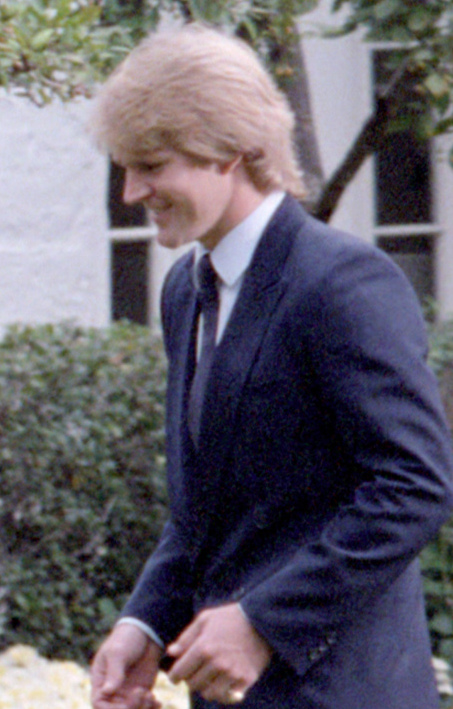
- Moyers in 1982

Personal information
- Full name: Steven Carl Moyers
- Date of birth: September 23, 1956 (age 70)
- Place of birth: St. Louis, Missouri, United States
- Position: Forward

College career
Years	Team	Apps	(Gls)
1976	UMSL Tritons		

Senior career*
Years	Team	Apps	(Gls)
1977	St. Louis Stars	3	(1)
1978–1981	California Surf	113	(37)
1982–1984	New York Cosmos	66	(30)
1985	St. Louis Steamers (indoor)	11	(1)
1985–1986	Canton Invaders (indoor)		
1985–1986	Milwaukee Wave (indoor)	14	(15)

International career
1980–1984	United States	7	(2)
- * Club domestic league appearances and goals

Steve Moyers (born September 23, 1956, in St. Louis, Missouri) is a retired soccer forward from the United States, who was a member of the American squad that competed at the 1984 Summer Olympics in Los Angeles, California. He spent eight seasons in the North American Soccer League, one in the Major Indoor Soccer League and one in the American Indoor Soccer Association.

== Professional ==
Moyers grew up in Saint Louis and attended the University of Missouri-St. Louis where he spent one season, 1976, on the men's soccer team. In 1977, he attended a walk on trial with the St. Louis Stars of the North American Soccer League (NASL). He made the team, but saw time in only three regular-season games. At the end of the 1977 season, the Stars moved to Los Angeles and became the California Surf. Moyers moved with the team and saw his appearances rapidly increase. At the end of the 1981 season the Surf folded and the New York Cosmos purchased his contract. When the NASL collapsed after the 1984 outdoor season, the Cosmos moved to the Major Indoor Soccer League (MISL). However, the team folded just after halfway through the 1984–1985 season. Moyers then moved to the St. Louis Steamers of MISL. After scoring only once in eleven games, Moyers was released. He then moved first to the Canton Invaders of the American Indoor Soccer Association (AISA), then the Milwaukee Wave (AISA) for the 1985–1986 season. At the end of that season, he retired from playing professional soccer.

== National team ==
Moyers earned a total number of seven caps for the U.S. between 1980 and 1984. He scored two goals, both in a 2–1 victory over Mexico on November 23, 1980. That was the first U.S. victory over Mexico in 46 years.

In 1984, Moyers was selected for the U.S. soccer team at the 1984 Summer Olympics in Los Angeles. The U.S. went 1-1-1 and failed to make the second round.

On October 14, 1982, Moyers visited the White House along with Pelé for a soccer promotional visit with President Ronald Reagan.
