= Nelsi Morais =

Brazilian footballer

Personal information
- Date of birth: October 22, 1951 (age 75)
- Place of birth: Santos, São Paulo, Brazil
- Height: 5 ft 9 in (1.75 m)
- Position: Midfielder

Senior career*
Years	Team	Apps	(Gls)
1970–1975	Santos		
1975–1980	New York Cosmos	63	(1)
1981–1982	New York Cosmos (indoor)	7	(3)
1990	New Jersey Eagles		
Total		70	(4)
- * Club domestic league appearances and goals

Nelsi Morais (born 22 October 1951) is a Brazilian former professional footballer who played as a midfielder.

== Career ==
Born in Santos, São Paulo, Morais played for Santos and the New York Cosmos.

Morais later played for the New Jersey Eagles of the American Professional Soccer League.
