= Krikor Yepremian =

Krikor Sarkis Yepremian was an Armenian Cypriot–American sports executive who was the general manager of the Fort Lauderdale Strikers and New York Cosmos of the North American Soccer League and the New York Arrows of the Major Indoor Soccer League.

== Early life ==
Yepremian, who was of Armenian descent, emigrated from Cyprus to the United States in the 1960s. He attended Indiana University Bloomington, where he played for and coached the Indiana Hoosiers men's soccer team. In 1966, he encouraged his brother, Garo, who was playing association football in England, to come to the United States. Krikor taught his brother how to kick an American football and he received an offer to play for the Butler Bulldogs football team. However, the NCAA deemed Garo ineligible to play college sports and he pursued a kicking job in the National Football League. Garo Yepremian played for the Detroit Lions from 1966 to 1967, then signed with the Miami Dolphins in 1970. Krikor served as his brother's manager and negotiated his contracts.

== Soccer team management ==
In 1976, Yepremian was named general manager of Miami Toros of the North American Soccer League. Despite having no experience in soccer management, the Robbie family, which owned both the Toros and Dolphins, were impressed with how Yepremian managed his brother's career. Shortly after his hiring, the team moved from Miami to Fort Lauderdale, Florida. Yepremian wanted to name the club the Fort Lauderdale Sea Boots, but was talked out of it and the team was named the Strikers instead.

Yepremian stepped down after the 1977 season to become an executive assistant with the New York Cosmos. He was promoted to general manager in 1978 and given the additional title of vice president in 1979. The Cosmos won the Soccer Bowl twice (1978 and 1980) during Yepremian's tenure as GM. He resigned after the 1981 season, reportedly to pursue outside business interests. Shortly thereafter, he was named president of the New York Arrows of the Major Indoor Soccer League. The team was cold the following season and Yepremian left the organization.

== Neuchatel Chocolates ==
Yepremian met his wife, Patricia while in New York City to interview for a job with the Cosmos. She ran chocolate stores in the Waldorf Astoria and Plaza Hotels, but wanted to start her own business. In 1981, they founded Neuchatel Chocolates. They moved to Oxford, Pennsylvania, in 1986 and opened a small factory there. Due to the popularity of their New York stores, they began franchising and by 1994, had locations in Philadelphia, San Diego, Minneapolis, and Chicago. They also had accounts with Disney's Grand Floridian Resort & Spa and most of the Trump hotels and casinos in Atlantic City, New Jersey, as well as a store in Trump Towers. The Yepremians declared bankruptcy in the mid 1990s and the company was acquired by Albert Lauber.

== Later life ==
After their home in Oxford burned down, the Yepremians moved to Palm Harbor, Florida, where Krikor worked as a salesman at a Buick dealership. They later moved to Hemet, California. Yepremian died in 2018.
