= Hubert Birkenmeier =

German footballer (born 1949)

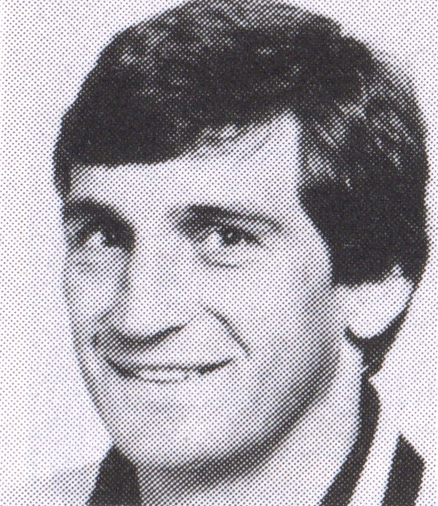
- Birkenmeier circa 1984

Personal information
- Date of birth: 24 May 1949 (age 77)
- Place of birth: Hartheim am Rhein, West Germany
- Position: Goalkeeper

Senior career*
Years	Team	Apps	(Gls)
1970–1972	Freiburger FC		
1972–1977	Tennis Borussia Berlin	85	(0)
1977–1979	Freiburger FC	76	(0)
1979–1985	New York Cosmos	145	(0)
1981–1985	New York Cosmos (indoor)	24	(0)
1985–1986	Chicago Sting (indoor)	23	(0)
1986–1987	New York Express (indoor)	13	(0)
1987	Los Angeles Lazers (indoor)	3	(0)
1987	Cosmopolitan Eagles		
1988	New York Pancyprian-Freedoms		
1989–1990	New Jersey Eagles		
Total		369+	(0+)

Managerial career
- 1984: New York Cosmos (interim)
- * Club domestic league appearances and goals

Hubert Birkenmeier (born 24 May 1949) is a German retired professional footballer who played professionally in Germany, the North American Soccer League, Major Indoor Soccer League and American Soccer League. His greatest success came with the New York Cosmos in the NASL.

== Career ==
Birkenmeier began his career in West Germany. In 1970, he signed with Freiburger FC before moving to Tennis Borussia Berlin in 1972. He remained in Berlin until 1977 when the Cosmos of the North American Soccer League purchased his contract. At the time he could not speak English. Birkenmeier remained with the Cosmos until 1985. During those years, he played eight outdoor NASL, two indoor NASL and one Major Indoor Soccer League season. During those years, Birkenmeier was a First Team NASL All Star selection in 1982 and 1984, a Second Teamer in 1981 and an Honorable Mention in 1983. Birkenmeier was the Cosmos' starting goalie for three consecutive Soccer Bowls ('80, '81 & '82), and did not concede a goal in any of them. In 1985, he also played several exhibition games for the Cosmos. In August 1985, he signed with the Chicago Sting of the MISL. He spent most of the season as a backup for Victor Nogueira. The Sting waived him on 29 April 1986. On 4 November 1986, Birkenmeier signed with the expansion New York Express of the MISL. The Express folded two-thirds of the way through the season and on 6 March 1987, the Los Angeles Lazers signed him to a ten-day contract. He then played for the Cosmopolitan Eagles during the 1987 outdoor exhibition season. In 1988, he played for the New York Pancyprian-Freedoms of the Cosmopolitan Soccer League as it went to the semifinals of the National Challenge Cup. He returned signed with the New York Eagles of the American Soccer League. He remained with them through the 1990 season in the American Professional Soccer League.

== Retirement from professional soccer ==
Birkenmeier now manages a sporting goods store called Birkenmeier Sport Shop in Hackensack, New Jersey. The store was founded and originally owned by Birkenmeier but was sold in 1985 to his former Cosmos teammate Andranik Eskandarian when Birkenmeier left to play for the Chicago Sting. The teammates helped teach Eksandarian's son, Alecko, how to play inside the store. He also is now a goalkeeping coach for World Class FC.

== Current activities ==
On a visit back to his hometown of Hartheim in 2009 to celebrate his 60th birthday, he described initially having mixed feelings about leaving Germany to play in the United States. He stated that in his first few months as a Cosmo, he lived in a hotel and had some difficulty with both homesickness and the learning of a new language. However, he credits his teammate and fellow countryman, Franz Beckenbauer with helping him adjust quickly to his new home, team and language, helping him to become one of the team's most dependable and popular players while sharing in two NASL championships. Birkenmeier continues to manage the sporting goods store he founded but stays involved in the sport acting as goalkeeping coach with the U.S. Youth National Team. He also runs a soccer youth camp for seven weeks each summer in Northern New Jersey. In the same interview, he stated that he goes back home to Hartheim every year to visit his brother and sister and stays abreast of hometown news via the internet.
