= Júlio Mazzei =

Brazilian football coach (1930–2009)

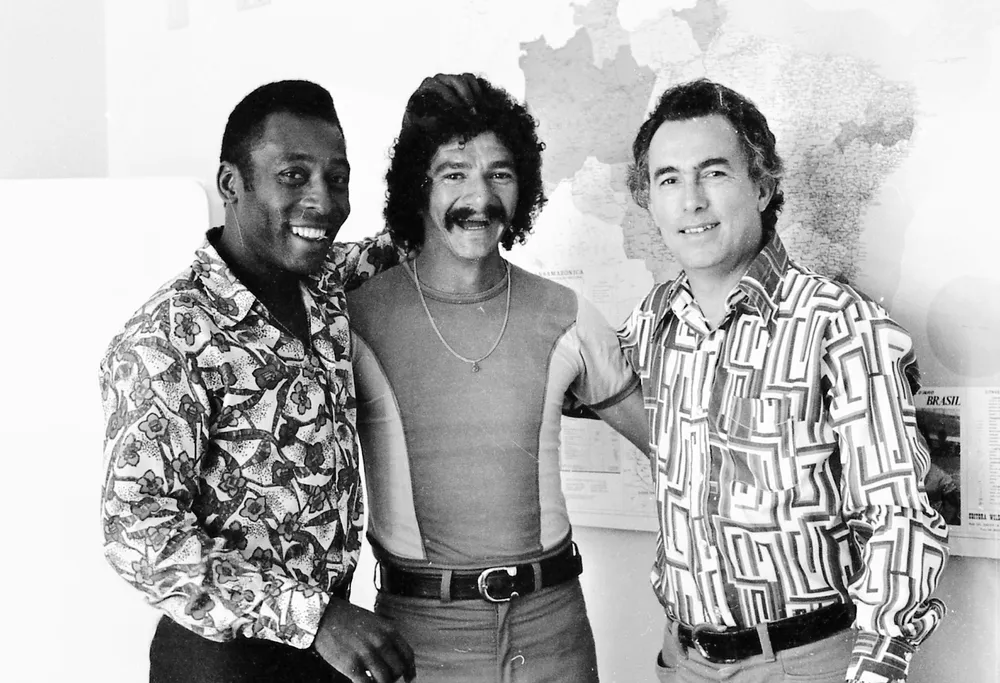
- Mazzei (right) alongside Pelé and Manoel Maria in 1975

Personal information
- Full name: Júlio Herculano Pedroso Mazzei
- Date of birth: 27 August 1930
- Place of birth: Guaiçara, São Paulo, Brazil
- Date of death: 10 May 2009 (aged 78)
- Place of death: Santos, São Paulo, Brazil

Managerial career
- Years: Team
- 1980: New York Cosmos
- 1982–1983: New York Cosmos

Júlio Herculano Pedroso, known as Júlio Mazzei, was a Brazilian soccer coach. He is perhaps best known for bringing Pele to New York Cosmos of the North American Soccer League.

He was a Physical Education teacher trained in São Carlos and a coach for Santos in the 1960s. He established a new type of football training, using new methods, such as Circuit Training, created in 1958.

With Santos he won the Campeonato Paulista in 1967, 1968, 1969 and 1973, the Recopa Sudamericana in 1968 and the Torneio Roberto Gomes Pedrosa in 1968.

in 1965, he was a coach of the Brazil B national team.

He coached the Cosmos to the NASL title with a 1–0 victory over the Seattle Sounders in Soccer Bowl '82.

He died in 2009, aged 78.

== Links ==
- Michael Lewis: Passing of a Legend: Prof. Mazzei, confidante of Pele, former Cosmos coach, passes away, Big Apple Soccer, 11 May 2009.
- Júlio Mazzei: Ex-Professor de Educação Física, Que fim levou?, Terceiro Tempo, (per 30 October 2016).
- Josmar F. Lopes: Julio Mazzei, the Cosmos and the Untold Story of the Man behind the Glasses, Reviews by Josmar Lopes, 7 April 2016.
