= Wim Rijsbergen =

Dutch football manager and former player

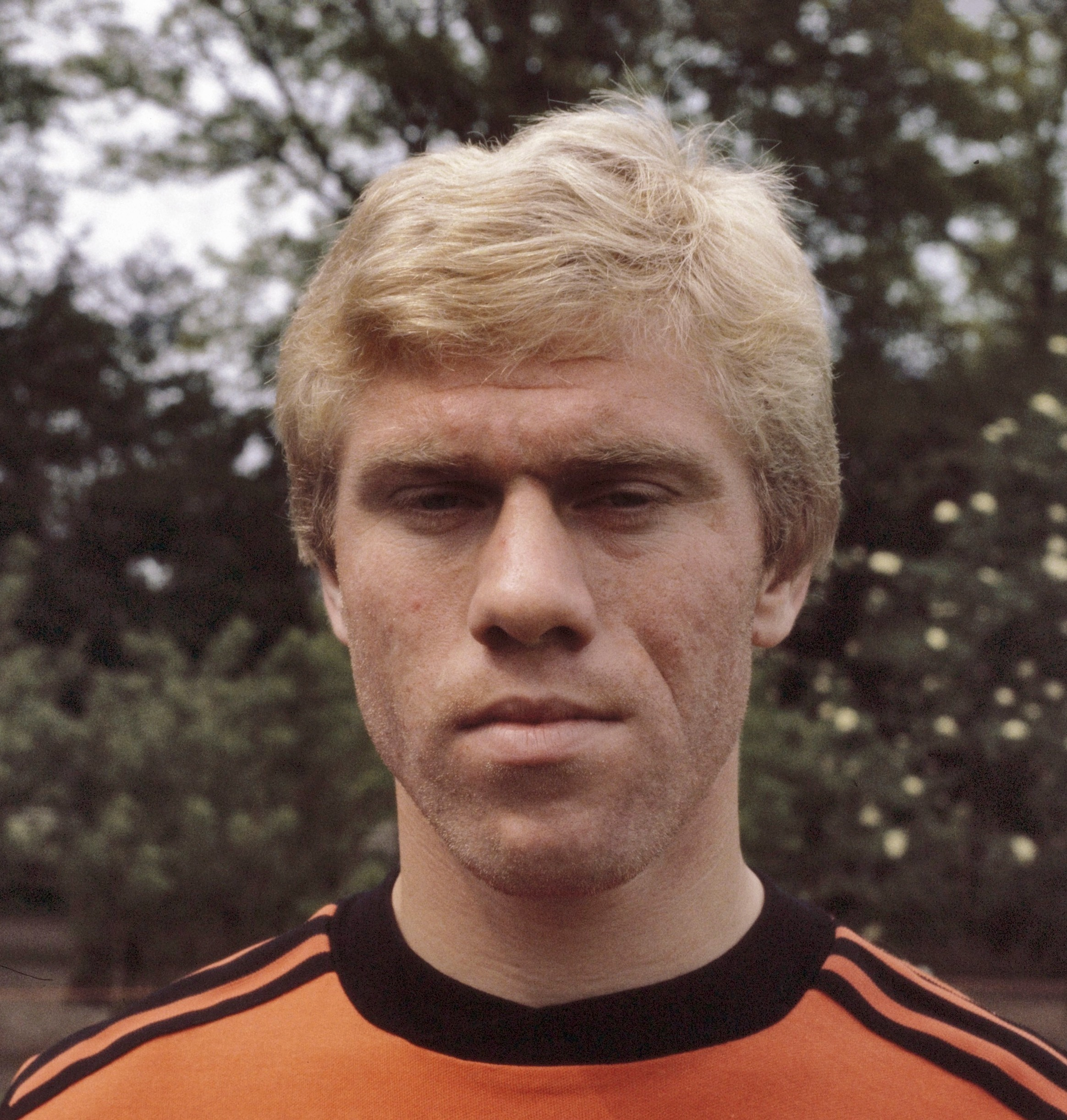
- Rijsbergen in 1978

Personal information
- Full name: Wilhelmus Gerardus Rijsbergen
- Date of birth: 18 January 1952 (age 74)
- Place of birth: Leiden, Netherlands
- Height: 1.81 m (5 ft 11 in)
- Position: Defender

Youth career
- VV Roodenburg

Senior career*
Years	Team	Apps	(Gls)
1970–1971	PEC Zwolle	26	(0)
1971–1978	Feyenoord	173	(1)
1978–1979	Bastia	24	(0)
1979–1983	New York Cosmos	86	(2)
1983–1984	Helmond Sport	21	(0)
1984–1986	Utrecht	18	(0)
Total		348	(3)

International career
1974–1978	Netherlands	28	(1)

Managerial career
- 1986–1988: Ajax Amsterdam (youth coach)
- 1988–1989: DS'79 (youth coach)
- 1989–1991: VV Roodenburg
- 1991–1993: DWS
- 1993–1995: FC Volendam
- 1995–1997: NAC Breda
- 1997–1998: Groningen
- 1998–1999: Universidad Católica (youth coach)
- 1999–2001: Universidad Católica
- 2002: Al-Ittifaq
- 2003–2004: Club América (assistant)
- 2005–2006: Trinidad and Tobago (assistant)
- 2006–2007: Trinidad and Tobago
- 2010–2011: PSM Makassar
- 2011–2012: Indonesia
- 2012–2013: Indonesia (technical director)
- 2019: Solomon Islands
Medal record
Men's football
Representing Netherlands
FIFA World Cup
Runner-up	1974 West Germany
Runner-up	1978 Argentina
European Championship
Third place	1976 Yugoslavia
- * Club domestic league appearances and goals

Wilhelmus "Wim" Gerardus Rijsbergen (Dutch pronunciation: [ʋɪlˈɦɛlmʏs (ˈʋɪm) ɣeːˈrɑrdʏs ˈrɛizbɛrɣə(n)]; born 18 January 1952) is a Dutch football manager and former player who played as a defender. He was last the manager of Solomon Islands' national team.

== Playing career ==
Rijsbergen was born in Leiden, South Holland. Playing for Feyenoord Rotterdam, he was part of the Netherlands national football team which finished second in both the 1974 and 1978 World Cups. He later played in the North American Soccer League, for the New York Cosmos. Rijsbergen began his professional career at PEC Zwolle, and ended it in 1986 at FC Utrecht.

== Managerial career ==
In 1999, he was appointed manager of Universidad Católica.

Rijsbergen, an assistant to Leo Beenhakker at the 2006 World Cup in Germany, assumed control of the Trinidad and Tobago national team in his own right following the World Cup. As of December 2007, he was suspended by the Trinidad and Tobago Football Federation for six months, through 4 June 2007 and replaced.

He was manager of Indonesia from 2011 to 2012, after which he stayed in Indonesia to become technical director. Rijsbergen joined the Solomon Islands and guided the island nation to a fourth place in group B in the 2019 Pacific Games.

== Career statistics ==
=== International ===
Appearances and goals by national team and year
National team	Year	Apps	Goals
Netherlands	1974	9	0
Netherlands	1975	3	0
Netherlands	1976	5	1
Netherlands	1977	5	0
Netherlands	1978	6	0
Total		28	1

Scores and results list the Netherlands' goal tally first, score column indicates score after each Rijsbergen goal.

List of international goals scored by Wim Rijsbergen
No.	Date	Venue	Opponent	Score	Result	Competition
1	25 April 1976	De Kuip, Rotterdam, Netherlands	Belgium	1–0	5–0	UEFA Euro 1976 qualification

== Managerial statistics ==
Team	Nat	From	To	Record				
Team	Nat	From	To	G	W	D	L	Win %
Indonesia	(Indonesia)	July 2011	January 2012	11	2	3	6	18.18

== Honors ==
=== Player ===
PEC Zwolle

- Tweede Divisie runner up: 1970–71

Feyenoord

- Eredivisie: 1973–74
- UEFA Cup: 1973–74

New York Cosmos

- Soccer Bowl: 1980, 1982
- Soccer Bowl runner up: 1981

Utrecht

- KNVB Cup: 1984–85

Netherlands

- FIFA World Cup runner-up: 1974, 1978
- UEFA Euro third place: 1976
- Tournoi de Paris: 1978

=== Manager ===
FC Volendam

- KNVB Cup: runner up 1994–95
