= Vladislav Bogićević =

Serbian footballer

Personal information
- Date of birth: 7 November 1950 (age 76)
- Place of birth: Belgrade, PR Serbia, FPR Yugoslavia
- Position: Midfielder

Youth career
- 1965–1968: Red Star Belgrade

Senior career*
Years	Team	Apps	(Gls)
1968–1978	Red Star Belgrade	185	(17)
1969–1970	→ Maribor (loan)	34	(0)
1978–1984	New York Cosmos	203	(31)
Total		422	(48)

International career
1971–1977	Yugoslavia	23	(2)

Managerial career
- 1995–1996: New York Centaurs
- 2000–2002: FR Yugoslavia (assistant)
- 2003–2004: Belenenses
- 2010: SC White Eagles
- * Club domestic league appearances and goals

Vladislav Bogićević (Serbian Cyrillic: Владислав Богићевић, Serbian pronunciation: [ʋlǎdislaʋ bogîtɕeʋitɕ]; born 7 November 1950) is a Serbian retired footballer.

He is a member of the American National Soccer Hall of Fame.

== Club career ==
Bogićević's playing career included 13 seasons with Red Star Belgrade where he was part of five Yugoslav league winning teams. Throughout his time at Red Star he was known by nickname Bleki.

With his confident play for Red Star, Bogićević garnered interest from several European clubs. However, strict sporting rules of communist Yugoslavia stating that no player could move abroad until the start of calendar year in which he turns 28 prevented the transfer from taking place.

=== New York Cosmos ===
In January 1978, at the age of 27, Bogićević joined the New York Cosmos of the North American Soccer League. In time, the media would nickname him Bogie. In 203 regular season games, Bogićević scored 31 goals and 147 assists. He appeared in additional 33 playoff games scoring 8 goals and 19 assists.

"Bogie" was named to either the first or second team all-star team in each of his seven NASL seasons (second team in 1978 and 1979, and first team in 1980, 1981, 1982, 1983, and 1984). He was also on three NASL championship winning teams. He was the league assist leader in 1981, 1982, and 1983.

Bogićević was inducted into the U.S. National Soccer Hall of Fame on 14 October 2002.

== International ==
On the international scene, Bogićević appeared in 23 matches for Yugoslavia, scored two goals, and represented his country at the 1974 FIFA World Cup.

=== 1972 Euros qualifying ===
Bogićević made his debut on 9 May 1971 versus East Germany. Looking to protect the 0–2 away lead, head coach Vujadin Boškov brought the 21-year-old as a second-half substitute for Brane Oblak. By the end Yugoslavia, had conceded a goal, but still managed to hold on for important 1–2 win in front of 94,876 fans in Leipzig.

A short substitute appearance was Bogićević's only action for the entire qualifying cycle. Yugoslavia finished the qualifying group on top, but lost to the Soviet Union in the second qualifying round and thus failed to clinch a spot for the final tournament in Belgium.

It would be year and a half before Bogićević got another chance with the national team. On 20 September 1972, in preparation for the start of 1974 World Cup qualifying, Yugoslavia played a friendly with Italy in Turin. Head coach Boškov, who stayed on for another qualifying cycle despite a failure in the previous one, gave Bogićević another substitute appearance – this time for Petar Krivokuća.

=== 1974 World Cup qualifying ===
Bogićević didn't feature in the first two matches of Yugoslavia's qualifying campaign during the fall of 1972.

However, he finally got a starting opportunity on 9 May 1973 in a friendly versus West Germany in Munich as well as four days later versus Poland in Warsaw. A couple of months later, he was a starter in another friendly versus Hungary in Belgrade.

When qualifying resumed on 21 October 1973 with a clash versus Spain in Zagreb, Bogićević reached another milestone – his first competitive start for the national team. Yugoslavia drew 0–0 with the group favourites and the disappointing draw spelled the muffin of Boškov's time with the national team. He was replaced by a 5-man coaching commission consisting of Miljan Miljanić, Milan Ribar, Sulejman Rebac, Tomislav Ivić, and Milovan Ćirić. Bogićević did not play in the remaining qualifier, a nerve-wracking match that Yugoslavia won 4-2, getting the two-goal margin necessary to avoid elimination from qualifying.

Due to finishing the group stage level on points and goal difference, Yugoslavia and Spain were ordered to contest a single-match playoff at a neutral venue with the winner going to the final tournament. Bogićević played the entire game in Frankfurt.

== Post-playing ==
Since retirement from football, Bogićević has been involved in many different ventures. He was hired by CONCACAF to promote soccer throughout the United States. He later opened an Italian restaurant and entered real estate business for a while. He also developed a soccer academy in Clifton, New Jersey that bears his name.

=== Coaching ===
In 1994, Bogićević began to take an interest in coaching and has since then had various head coaching stints.

In July 1995, he took over the coaching of the now-defunct A-League's New York Centaurs after coach Len Roitman stepped down in the middle of the season. The team finished last in their division.

After taking part in national team scouting sessions during World Cup 1998, he signed a two-year contract with Yugoslav FA in August 2000. When Ilija Petković took the head coaching role for the first time, Bogićević became his assistant. Petković resigned in early 2001, but Bogićević stayed on.

In December 2001 when Yugoslav/Serbo-Montenegrin FA was looking for a single national team coach to replace the 3-man coaching commission, Bogićević expressed strong interest in the position and was interviewed. Then YFA president Dragan Stojković publicly said Bogićević had a disadvantage compared to the other candidates due to his limited head coaching experience and a lack of bench results. However, just several days later, Dejan Savićević was given the job despite having no prior coaching experience. When his contract with the FA expired in the summer of 2002, Bogićević, who by this time was in a role of observer, did not wish to renew it and left the national team.

One of his most recent coaching stints was with Portuguese first division side Belenenses during the 2003/2004 season. He resigned at the end of the season.

In 2010, Bogićević coached SC White Eagles from Paterson, New Jersey, a team that competes in the North Jersey Soccer League. In 2012, he joined Nyack College (NCAA Division II) Women's soccer staff as an assistant/technical advisor of Head Coach Samuel Oduro.

As of 2024, he coaches with SNK Soccer Club based out of Fairfield, New Jersey.

== Career statistics ==
=== International goals ===
#	Date	Venue	Opponent	Score	Result	Competition
1.	18 June 1974	Parkstadion, Gelsenkirchen, West Germany	Zaire	9–0	Win	1974 FIFA World Cup
2.	9 June 1975	Ullevaal Stadion, Oslo, Norway	Norway	1–3	Win	UEFA Euro 1976 qualifying
Correct as of 10 December 2013

== Honours ==
New York Cosmos

- NASL: 1978, 1980, 1982; Runner-up: 1981

Individual

- NASL All-Stars: First-team: 1980, 1981, 1982, 1983, 1984; Second-Team: 1978, 1979

== See also ==
- List of NK Maribor players
