= David Brcic =

American former soccer player

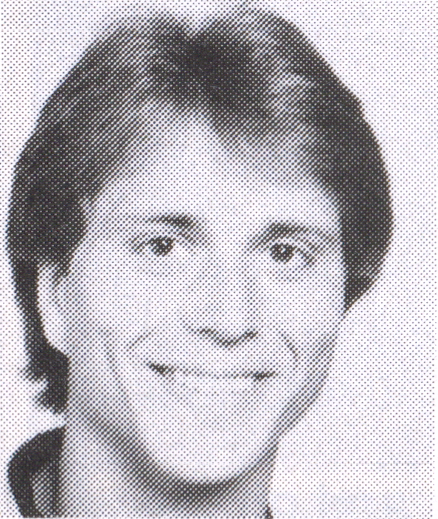
- Brcic circa 1984

Personal information
- Full name: David Joseph Brcic
- Date of birth: January 21, 1958 (age 68)
- Place of birth: St. Louis, Missouri, United States
- Height: 6 ft 2 in (1.88 m)
- Position: Goalkeeper

College career
Years	Team	Apps	(Gls)
1977	Saint Louis Billikens		

Senior career*
Years	Team	Apps	(Gls)
1977–1984	New York Cosmos	21	(0)
1978–1979	→ Greenock Morton (loan)	6	(0)
1981–1982	New York Cosmos (indoor)	14	(0)
1983–1984	New York Cosmos (indoor)	23	(0)
1984–1985	Wichita Wings (indoor)	5	(0)
1985–1986	Pittsburgh Spirit (indoor)	43	(0)
1986–1987	Los Angeles Lazers (indoor)	79	(0)
1988–1989	Kansas City Comets (indoor)	16	(0)
1989–1990	St. Louis Storm (indoor)	21	(0)
Total		228	(0)

International career
1979–1985	United States	4	(0)
- * Club domestic league appearances and goals

David Joseph Brcic (born January 21, 1958) is an American former professional soccer player who played as a goalkeeper in the North American Soccer League and Major Indoor Soccer League. He also competed at the 1984 Summer Olympics and earned four caps with the United States men's national soccer team.

== Youth career ==
In 1976, Brcic graduated from Bishop DuBourg High School in St. Louis, Missouri where he played on the school's soccer team. He has been inducted into the school's Hall of Fame. After high school, Brcic attended St. Louis University where he played a single season of college soccer.

== Outdoor soccer ==
In 1977, he left the university to sign with the New York Cosmos of the North American Soccer League. Brcic remained a back-up with the Cosmos through the 1979 season. Through that year, he had played only eight games in goal. During the 1978–79 off-season, the Cosmos loaned Brcic to Greenock Morton of the Scottish First Division, then the top league in Scotland. After injuries hit Greenock Morton's goalkeepers, the team brought Brcic into its first team where he played six league games, including a win at Aberdeen F.C. on December 20, 1978, during which Brcic stopped a penalty kick. Brcic returned to the Cosmos for the 1980 season and remained with the team until it folded during the 1984–1985 indoor season.

== National team ==
Brcic did not only return to the Cosmos in 1979, he also earned his first cap with the U.S. national team when he came on for Arnie Mausser in a May 2, 1979, loss to France. Brcic did not play again for the senior team until 1984. That year he was the starting goalkeeper for the U.S. team at the 1984 Los Angeles Olympics. That year, he also appeared in a May 30 scoreless draw versus Italy and a 4–0 World Cup qualifying win against the Netherlands Antilles on October 6. He played one more game with the senior national team, a 2–1 World Cup qualification victory over Trinidad and Tobago on May 15, 1985.

== Indoor soccer ==
By this time Brcic was ending his outdoor professional career and had embarked on his indoor years. He gained his first indoor soccer experience during the 1981–1982 NASL indoor season. He played fourteen games for the Cosmos as they finished with the league's second worst record. Brcic and the Cosmos did much better in the second NASL indoor season, which didn't take place until 1983–1984. He started twenty-six games as New York made it to the championship game before falling to the San Diego Sockers. The next year, the Cosmos entered the Major Indoor Soccer League. However, they were a shell of the team they were a few years prior and folded thirty-three games into the forty-eight-game season. Brcic began the season with the Cosmos, but when they collapsed, he moved to the Wichita Wings. At the end of the season, he moved again to the Pittsburgh Spirit for the 1985–1986 season. Although the Spirit finished in the bottom of the standings, Brcic was selected to the first team All MISL list. For the 1986–1987 season, he was with his fourth team in three seasons, the Los Angeles Lazers. Once again, he found himself with a struggling team. Brcic also played with the Kansas City Comets and St. Louis Storm.

Since retiring from playing, Brcic graduated from Maryville University in 1996 has run soccer camps and is President of Soccer Master. He resides in St. Louis with his wife Cindy and two children Emily and Alex.
