= Andranik Eskandarian =

Iranian footballer (born 1951)

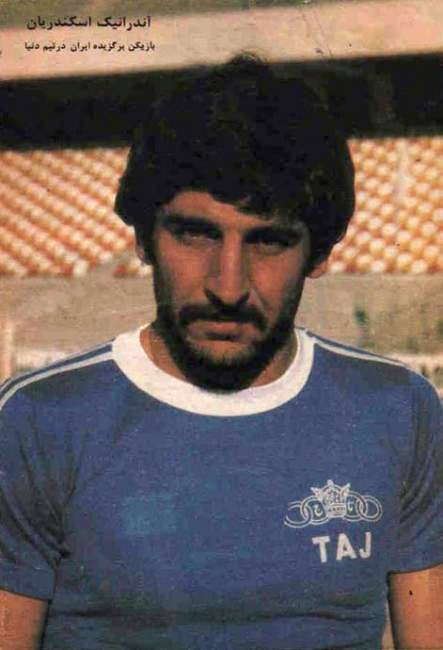

Personal information
- Full name: Andranik Eskandarian
- Date of birth: 31 December 1951 (age 74)
- Place of birth: Tehran, Imperial State of Iran
- Height: 1.75 m (5 ft 9 in)
- Position: Centre back

Senior career*
Years	Team	Apps	(Gls)
1968–1970	Poolad Tehran		
1970–1972	Ararat Tehran		
1972–1978	Taj	184	(2)
1978–1984	New York Cosmos	142	(0)
1984–1985	New York Cosmos (indoor)	29	(1)
1986–1987	New York Express (indoor)	14	(0)
1989–1990	New Jersey Eagles		

International career
1975–1978	Iran	29	(0)
- * Club domestic league appearances and goals

Andranik Eskandarian (Armenian: Անդրանիկ Իսքանտարեան, Persian: آندرانیک اسکندریان, born 31 December 1951) is an Iranian former footballer. He played as a defender for the F.C. Ararat Tehran, Taj SC and New York Cosmos of the North American Soccer League.

== Career ==
He won the Iranian league in 1975 and reached the second place in 1974. Further he won the Hazfi Cup in 1977. He played six years for Taj SC. Taj's fans called him Barbed Wire.

Eskandarian was a member of the Iranian team winning the Asia Cup 1976 in Tehran and reaching the quarterfinals of the Olympic Tournament in Montreal in 1976. He also played for Iran in the 1978 World Cup, the country's first appearance in the tournament. He was the first member of Iran's team to score in the World Cup: an own-goal in a match against Scotland that his team later tied, 1‍–‍1. The game was still considered a success for Iran, including Eskandarian's play as a defender against Kenny Dalglish and Joe Jordan, and an embarrassment for Scotland.

Soon after that, he moved to America to play for the highest-profile team in the country, the New York Cosmos, beginning in the 1979 season. After the Cosmos folded in 1984, Eskandarian played for the New York Express during its half-season in the Major Indoor Soccer League. From 1989 through 1990, he played for the New Jersey Eagles of the American Soccer League.

== Personal ==
Andranik Eskandarian was born on 31 December 1951 in Tehran to an Armenian family. He is the father of former Major League Soccer player Alecko Eskandarian. Eskandarian became a United States citizen in 1984 and now owns and operates two sporting goods stores in New Jersey.

== Honours ==
=== Club ===
Taj

- Iranian Football League: 1974–75
- Hazfi Cup: 1976–77

New York Cosmos

- North American Soccer League: 1978, 1980, 1982

=== National ===
Iran

- AFC Asian Cup: 1976
