= 1973 North American Soccer League season =

Soccer league season

North American Soccer League 1973 season
- Season: 1973
- Teams: 9
- Champions: Philadelphia Atoms
- Premiers: Dallas Tornado
- Matches: 90
- Goals: 246 (2.73 per match)
- Top goalscorer: (Trinidad and Tobago) Warren Archibald (United States) Ilija Mitić (12 goals)
- Longest unbeaten run: 13, Philadelphia
- Highest attendance: 21,700 (Dallas @ Phil)
- Lowest attendance: 1,100 (NY @ Montreal)
- Average attendance: 6,290

Statistics of North American Soccer League in season 1973. This was the 6th season of the NASL.

== Overview ==
Nine teams took part in the league with the Philadelphia Atoms winning the championship.

During the season, Tiburones Rojos de Veracruz from Vera Cruz, Mexico, played each of the nine NASL clubs in exhibition games that counted in the league's final standings. The 1973 season would be the last season in which games from non-league clubs counted in league standings.

A week before the NASL Final 1973, commissioner Phil Woosnam announced that no team in the league made a profit during the season.

In a unique twist, the team with home field for the NASL Championship Game determined the date and time the game was to be played. When the Dallas Tornado won their semi-final, setting up the final with Philadelphia, they chose August 25 as the date of the game. They did this because the NASL loan agreements with players from the English First Division (the precursor to today's Premier League) expired before that date.

Because of this, Philadelphia's two leading scorers, Andy "The Flea" Provan and Jim Fryatt, were on their way back to England when the championship match was played on the 25th. Despite this, Philadelphia coach, Al Miller, put Bill Straub, a defender who had not played a minute for the club prior to the championship game, into the lineup at forward. The move paid off as Straub headed home the second goal in a 2–0 win with under five minutes remaining in the final.

== Changes from the previous season ==
=== New teams ===
- Philadelphia Atoms

=== Teams folding ===
- None

=== Teams moving ===
- None

=== Name changes ===
- Atlanta Chiefs to Atlanta Apollos
- Miami Gatos to Miami Toros

== Map of clubs ==
Eastern Division Northern Division Southern Division

== Regular season ==
W = Wins, L = Losses, T= Ties, GF = Goals For, GA = Goals Against, BP = Bonus Points, PTS= Total Points

POINT SYSTEM
6 points for a win, 3 points for a tie, 0 points for a loss, 1 bonus point for each goal scored up to three per game.

-Premiers (most points). -Other playoff teams.

Eastern Division	W	L	T	GF	GA	BP	PTS
Philadelphia Atoms	9	2	8	29	14	26	104
New York Cosmos	7	5	7	31	23	28	91
Miami Toros	8	5	6	26	21	22	88

Northern Division	W	L	T	GF	GA	BP	PTS
Toronto Metros	6	4	9	32	18	26	89
Montreal Olympique	5	10	4	25	32	22	64
Rochester Lancers	4	9	6	17	27	17	59

Southern Division	W	L	T	GF	GA	BP	PTS
Dallas Tornado	11	4	4	36	25	33	111
St. Louis Stars	7	7	5	27	27	25	82
Atlanta Apollos	3	9	7	23	40	23	62

== NASL All-Stars ==
First Team	Position	Second Team	Honorable Mention
(England) Ken Cooper, Dallas	G	(United States) Bob Rigby, Philadelphia	(Bermuda) Sam Nusum, Montreal
(United States) John Best, Dallas	D	(United States) Bob Smith, Philadelphia	(England) John Sewell, St. Louis
(England) Chris Dunleavy, Philadelphia	D	(England) Derek Trevis, Philadelphia	(United States) Barry Barto, Philadelphia
(England) David Sadler, Miami	D	(United States) Dick Hall, Dallas	(United States) Werner Roth, New York
(Scotland) Brian Rowan, Toronto	D	(England) Roy Evans, Philadelphia	(Wales) John Collins, Dallas
(United States) Ilija Mitic, Dallas	M	(United States) Pat McBride, St. Louis	(United States) Al Trost, St. Louis
(Portugal) Fernando Pinto, Toronto	M	(Argentina) Francisco Escos, Rochester	(United States) Roy Turner, Dallas
(Scotland) Ian McPhee, Toronto	M	(Argentina) Roberto Aguirre, Miami	(United States) George O'Neill, Philadelphia
(Scotland) Andy Provan, Philadelphia	F	(United States) Joey Fink, New York	(United States) Paul Child, Atlanta
(England) Jim Fryatt, Philadelphia	F	(England) Rick Reynolds, Dallas	(United States) Kyle Rote Jr., Dallas
(Trinidad and Tobago) Warren Archibald, Miami	F	(Bermuda) Randy Horton, New York	(England) Nick Jennings, Dallas

== Playoffs ==
All playoff games in all rounds including the NASL Final were single game elimination match ups.

=== Bracket ===
Semifinals
1	Dallas Tornado	1
4	New York Cosmos	0
2	Philadelphia Atoms	3
3	Toronto Metros	0

NASL Final 1973
1	Dallas Tornado	0
2	Philadelphia Atoms	2

=== Semifinals ===
August 15	New York Cosmos	0–1	Dallas Tornado	Texas Stadium • Att. 9,009

August 18	Toronto Metros	0–3	Philadelphia Atoms	Veterans Stadium • Att. 18,766

=== NASL Final 1973 ===
August 25

Dallas Tornado	0–2	Philadelphia Atoms
		Best 66' (o.g.); Straub 85' (Evans)

Texas Stadium, Irving, Texas
Attendance: 18,824
Referee: Bill Gallagher (Canada)

1973 NASL Champions: Philadelphia Atoms

== Post season awards ==
- Most Valuable Player: (Trinidad and Tobago) Warren Archibald, Miami
- Coach of the year: (United States) Al Miller, Philadelphia
- Rookie of the year: (United States) Kyle Rote, Jr., Dallas

== Average home attendance ==
Team	Average
Philadelphia Atoms	11,501
Dallas Tornado	7,474
St. Louis Stars	6,337
Toronto Metros	5,961
New York Cosmos	5,593
Miami Toros	5,479
Rochester Lancers	4,069
Montreal Olympique	3,856
Atlanta Apollos	3,317
