= NASL Final 1973 =

Soccer match

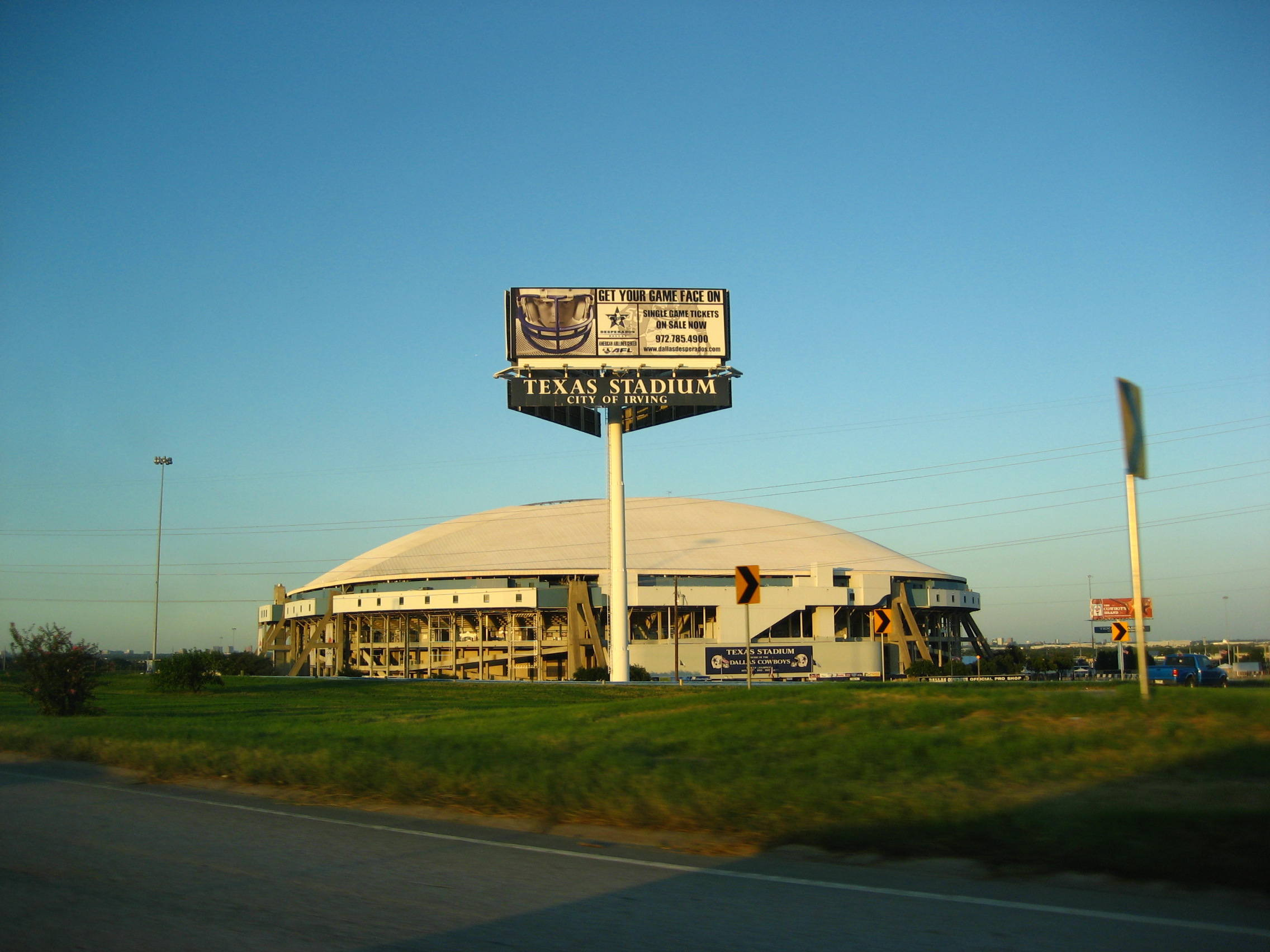
- Texas Stadium hosted the Final
- Event: NASL Final
Dallas Tornado	Philadelphia Atoms
0	2
- Date: August 25, 1973
- Venue: Texas Stadium, Irving, Texas
- Referee: Bill Gallacher (Canada)
- Attendance: 18,824

NASL Final 1973 was the championship match of the 1973 North American Soccer League season, between the expansion Philadelphia Atoms and the Dallas Tornado. The match was played on August 25, 1973 at Texas Stadium in Irving, Texas. The Philadelphia Atoms won the match, 2–0, and were crowned the 1973 North American Soccer League champions.

== Background ==
The Dallas Tornado qualified for the playoffs by virtue of winning the Southern Division with 111 points. They also had the highest point-total in the NASL, and therefore were guaranteed home field throughout the playoffs. They defeated the defending champion New York Cosmos, 1–0, in the first semifinal game played on August 15, 1973 to advance to the finals.

The Philadelphia Atoms qualified for the playoffs by virtue of winning the Eastern Division with 104 points. They also had the second highest point-total in the NASL. This guaranteed them at least one home playoff game. They soundly defeated the Northern Division champion Toronto Metros, 3–0, in the second semifinal game played on August 18, 1973 to advance to the finals.

== Match details ==
August 25, 1973
8:00 p.m. (CDT)

Dallas Tornado	0–2	Philadelphia Atoms
	Report 1 Report 2	Best 65' (o.g.); Straub 85'

Texas Stadium, Irving, Texas
Attendance: 18,824
Referee: Bill Gallacher (Canada)

Dallas Tornado	Philadelphia Atoms

GK	1	(England) Ken Cooper
DF	14	(England) Bobby Moffat
DF	4	(England) John Best (c)
DF	5	(England) Dick Hall
MF	6	(United States) Roy Turner	(substituted off) 82'
MF	13	(Ghana) Mohammad Attaih
MF	10	(Socialist Federal Republic of Yugoslavia) Ilija Mitic
FW	17	(England) Ray Bloomfield
FW	2	(United States) Jim Benedek	(substituted off) 45'
FW	12	(United States) Kyle Rote Jr.
FW	11	(England) Mike Renshaw
Substitutes:
MF	7	(England) Bob Ridley	(substituted in) 45'
FW	9	(Brazil) Luiz Juracy	(substituted in) 82'
Manager:
(England) Ron Newman

GK	1	(United States) Bob Rigby
DF	2	(United States) Barry Barto
DF	3	(United States) Bobby Smith
DF	4	(England) Roy Evans
DF	5	(England) Chris Dunleavy
DF	17	(United States) Bill Straub
MF	8	(United States) Stan Startzell
MF	18	(England) Derek Trevis (c)
MF	11	(United States) George O'Neill
FW	15	(United States) Charles Duccilli	(substituted off) 68'
FW	16	(United States) Karl Minor
Substitutes:
MF	12	(United States) Manfred Schellscheidt	(substituted in) 68'
Manager:
(United States) Al Miller

1973 NASL Champions: Philadelphia Atoms

Assistant referees:

Howard Neil (United States)
Bill Wuertz (United States)

== See also ==
- 1973 North American Soccer League season
