= 1984 New York Cosmos season =

New York Cosmos
1984 season
- Manager: (Italy) Eddie Firmani; Until December 11, 1984 (Germany) Hubert Birkenmeier; From December 11, 1984
- Stadium: Giants Stadium
- NASL: Division: 3rd Overall: 6th Playoffs: Did not qualify
- National Challenge Cup: Did not enter
- CONCACAF Champions' Cup: Did not enter
- Top goalscorer: League: (Paraguay) Roberto Cabañas (8 goals); All: (Paraguay) Roberto Cabañas (11 goals)
- Highest home attendance: 37,629 vs. FCB (May 28)
- Lowest home attendance: 7,581 vs. GB (Sept 12)
- Average home league attendance: 12,817
Home colors	Away colors

The 1984 New York Cosmos season was the fourteenth season for the New York Cosmos playing in the now-defunct North American Soccer League. It was the final year of the original Cosmos playing in the original NASL; they would play three friendlies in 1985 before disbanding. During the 1984 season, the Cosmos finished in third place in the Eastern Division, failing to qualify for the playoffs for the first time since 1975. It was also the first season since 1978 that the Cosmos failed to finish first in the overall league table, ending a streak of six premierships.

== Squad ==
Note: Flags indicate national team as defined under FIFA eligibility rules; some limited exceptions apply. Players may hold more than one non-FIFA nationality.

No.	Pos.	Nation	Player
1	GK	GER	Hubert Birkenmeier
2	DF	IRI	Andranik Eskandarian
3	DF	USA	Dan Canter
4	DF	USA	Jeff Durgan
5	DF	USA	Darryl Gee
6	DF	POL	Wladyslaw Zmuda
7	FW	ITA	Giuseppe Damiani
8	MF	YUG	Vladislav Bogićević
9	FW	PAR	Roberto Cabañas
11	FW	YUG	Dragan Vujović
12	FW	USA	Steve Moyers
13	MF	NED	Johan Neeskens
14	FW	POL	Stan Terlecki
15	FW	ENG	Alan Green

No.	Pos.	Nation	Player
16	MF	USA	Angelo DiBernardo
16	FW	BER	Randy Horton
17	MF	USA	Rick Davis
20	FW	RSA	Andrew Parkinson
21	GK	USA	David Brcic
22	MF	POR	Pedro DeBrito
23	MF	USA	Mike Fox
24	DF	USA	Kazbek Tambi
25	MF	SCO	Gerry Gray
27	MF	CAN	Carmine Marcantonio
28	FW	ECU	Chico Borja
30	MF	IRL	Gerry Reardon
31	DF	ITA	Fernando DeMatthaeis
32	DF	LBR	Doc Lawson

== Transfers ==
=== In ===
No.	Pos.	Player	Transferred From
3	DF	(United States) Dan Canter	(United States) Team America
6	DF	(Poland) Władysław Żmuda	(Italy) Hellas Verona
7	FW	(Italy) Giuseppe Damiani	(Italy) Milan
14	FW	(Poland) Stan Terlecki	(United States) Golden Bay Earthquakes
20	FW	(South Africa) Andrew Parkinson	(United States) Team America
22	MF	(Portugal) Pedro DeBrito	(United States) Tampa Bay Rowdies
25	MF	(Scotland) Gerry Gray	(Canada) Montreal Manic
27	MF	(Canada) Carmine Marcantonio	(Canada) Montreal Manic
28	FW	(Ecuador) Chico Borja	(United States) Team America
30	MF	(Republic of Ireland) Gerry Reardon	(United States) Tulsa Roughnecks
32	DF	(Liberia) Doc Lawson	(United States) New York Arrows

== Results ==
=== Trans-Atlantic Cup ===
Date	Opponent	Venue	Result	Attendance	Scorers
May 28, 1984	Barcelona	H	5–3	37,629	Bogićević, Cabañas, Moyers (2), Neeskens
June 3, 1984	Udinese	H	4–1	34,158	Terlecki, Vujović, Gray, Green

=== NASL regular season ===
Pld = Games Played, W = Wins, L = Losses, D = Draws, GF = Goals For, GA = Goals Against, Pts = Points
6 points for a win, 3 points for a draw, 0 points for a loss, 1 point for each goal scored (up to three per game).

==== Eastern Division Standings ====
Pos.	Eastern Division	W	L	GF	GA	BP	Pts	Home	Road
1	Chicago Sting	13	11	50	49	44	120	6–6	7–5
2	Toronto Blizzard	14	10	46	33	35	117	9–3	5–7
3	New York Cosmos	13	11	43	42	39	115	9–3	4–8
4	Tampa Bay Rowdies	9	15	43	61	35	87	9–3	0–12

==== Overall League Placing ====
Pos.	Eastern Division	W	L	GF	GA	BP	Pts	Home	Road
4	Chicago Sting	13	11	50	49	44	120	6–6	7–5
5	Toronto Blizzard	14	10	46	33	35	117	9–3	5–7
6	New York Cosmos	13	11	43	42	39	115	9–3	4–8
7	Tulsa Roughnecks	10	14	42	46	38	98	8–4	2–10
8	Golden Bay Earthquakes	8	16	61	62	49	95	4–8	4–8

==== Matches ====
- p.w.: won on penalties
- p.l.: lost on penalties

Date	Opponent	Venue	Result	Attendance	Scorers
May 13, 1984	Tampa Bay Rowdies	H	1–0	21,385	Cabanas
May 20, 1984	Vancouver Whitecaps	H	2–1	16,719	Cabanas (2)
May 26, 1984	Tampa Bay Rowdies	A	2–2 (p.l.)	12,722	Neeskens, DeBrito
June 9, 1984	Chicago Sting	H	0–5	12,134	
June 13, 1984	Golden Bay Earthquakes	A	1–3	11,696	Borja (2), Gray
June 17, 1984	Toronto Blizzard	H	2–1	15,482	Terlecki, Neeskens
June 22, 1984	Chicago Sting	A	1–2	11,458	Terlecki, Borja
June 24, 1984	Tulsa Roughnecks	H	3–1	14,267	Parkinson (2), Borja
June 27, 1984	Toronto Blizzard	A	0–4	10,231	
June 30, 1984	Minnesota Strikers	A	0–1	11,572	
July 8, 1984	Vancouver Whitecaps	A	1–2	20,627	Cabanas
July 11, 1984	Tampa Bay Rowdies	H	5–1	10,364	Bogićević, Vujović, Cabanas (2), Green
July 14, 1984	Tulsa Roughnecks	A	2–3	22,500	Bogićević, Green, Neeskens
July 25, 1984	San Diego Sockers	H	3–1	10,495	Vujović, Green, Cabanas
August 10, 1984	Minnesota Strikers	A	2–3	10,575	DeBrito, Green
August 15, 1984	San Diego Sockers	H	2–0	12,328	Cabanas, Moyers
August 19, 1984	Minnesota Strikers	H	3–4	12,872	Neeskens, Green
August 25, 1984	San Diego Sockers	A	1–2	5,215	Davis
August 29, 1984	Vancouver Whitecaps	H	2–1	11,444	Vujović, Terlecki
September 3, 1984	Golden Bay Earthquakes	A	3–4	8,567	Parkinson, Terlecki, Bogićević, Borja
September 5, 1984	Toronto Blizzard	H	1–1 (p.w.)	8,736	Davis
September 8, 1984	Tulsa Roughnecks	A	0–2	7,683	
September 12, 1984	Golden Bay Earthquakes	H	0–1	7,581	
September 15, 1984	Chicago Sting	A	0–1	10,729	

=== Friendlies ===
Date	Opponent	Venue	Result	Attendance	Scorers
April 27	(Mexico) América	N (Note: Held in Los Angeles Memorial Coliseum.)	0–3	9,938	–
May 5	(United States) Cosmos Alumni (Note: Team of all-time former Cosmos players, which included Jack Brand, Shep Messing (goalkeepers), Robert Iarusci, Francisco Marinho, Werner Roth, Carlos Alberto, Franz Beckenbauer, Bobby Smith (defenders), Rivelino, Terry Garbett, Nelsi Morais (midfielders), Pelé, Giorgio Chinaglia, Randy Horton, Dennis Tueart (forwards).)	H	6–2	32,653	Moyers (3), Green (2), DiBernardo
May 16	(United States) New York Nationals	H	2–2	n/a	Bogićević (2)
May 28	(Spain) Barcelona	H	5–3	37,629	Moyers (2), Cabañas, Neeskens, Bogićević
June 3	(Italy) Udinese	H	4–1	31,400	Green, Vujović, Terlecki, Gray
July 6	(United States) FC Seattle	H	2–1	7,631	Green, Cabañas
July 22	(United Nations) World All Stars	H	1–3	37,318	Neeskens
August 12	(Italy) Juventus	H	2–1	36,724	Moyers, Davis
August 22	(Argentina) Argentinos Juniors	H	3–2	13,796	Neeskens, Cabañas, Borja

== 1985 ==
After the disbanding of the North American Soccer League, the Cosmos opted to play as an independent team. After poor attendances and lack of media interest, the club shut down operations upon playing a handful of friendly matches.

May 27, 1985 1	New York Cosmos (United States)	2–2	(Argentina) Independiente	East Rutherford, New Jersey
	Liveric 16'; Vukcevic 89'	Report	Marangoni 33' (pen.); Percudani 56'	Stadium: Giants Stadium; Attendance: 16,556

June 9, 1985 2	New York Cosmos (United States)	2–0	(Portugal) Sporting CP	East Rutherford, New Jersey
	Figueroa 74'; Caszely 78'	Report		Stadium: Giants Stadium; Attendance: 15,724

June 16, 1985 3	New York Cosmos (United States)	1–2	(Italy) Lazio	East Rutherford, New Jersey
	D'Amico 85'	Report	Giordano 16'; Manfredonia 44'	Stadium: Giants Stadium; Attendance: 8,777

== See also ==
- 1984 North American Soccer League season
