= 2009 National Soccer Hall of Fame Induction Class =

These are the voting results for the National Soccer Hall of Fame 2009 induction class. Jeff Agoos and Joy Fawcett were selected for the Player category.

The Hall of Fame inducts individuals in three categories: Player, Veteran, and Builder. The Hall of Fame also selects individuals for special awards including the Colin Jose Media Award, Eddie Pearson Award, and a Medal of Honor.

== Player ==
To be eligible in this category, a player must have been retired at least three years and not more than ten. Voting began on November 3, 2008 and ended December 3, 2008. Any player who was named on at least 66.7% of the ballots cast was selected for induction. Any player who received less than 5% of the ballots was dropped from the Player eligibility list and will be placed on the Veteran eligibility list when they meet the criteria for that list.

On January 16, 2009, the Hall of Fame announced the results of the Player ballot. The announcement came on live television, a first for the Hall of Fame, broadcast from the annual NSCAA convention in St. Louis, Missouri.

=== Voting results ===
Voters cast 159 votes. Only two Players exceeded the minimum of 66.7% of votes cast in their favor required for induction.

Elected to the Hall of Fame:

- Jeff Agoos 67.9%
- Joy Fawcett 66.7%

Not elected but remaining on future ballots:

- Preki
- Thomas Dooley
- Marco Etcheverry
- Earnie Stewart
- Joe-Max Moore
- Carlos Valderrama
- Shannon MacMillan
- Peter Vermes

60.4%
53.5%
49.1%
42.8%
42.1%
37.1%
32.1%
31.4%

=== Eligible players ===
The following individuals were also declared eligible for induction in 2009, but were not among those with the most number of votes.

- Mike Burns
- Mauricio Cienfuegos
- Raúl Díaz Arce
- John Doyle
- Robin Fraser
- Dominic Kinnear
- Frank Klopas
- Roy Lassiter
- Pato Margetic
- Victor Nogueira
- Peter Nowak
- Cindy Parlow
- Mike Sorber
- Steve Trittschuh
- Tisha Venturini

== Veteran ==
On February 2, 2009, the Hall of Fame announced that none of the sixteen veteran candidates had received enough votes for induction into the hall. The top five candidates are as follows:

- Kyle Rote, Jr.
- Glenn Myernick
- George Best
- Teófilo Cubillas
- Shep Messing

44.64%
41.07%
37.05%
36.71%
33.93%

The Veterans Screening Committee had selected the following sixteen candidates from a pool of over 300 eligible players.

- Desmond Armstrong
- Barry Barto
- George Best
- Hubert Birkenmeier
- Teófilo Cubillas
- Steve David
- Linda Hamilton
- Lori Henry
- Shep Messing
- Bill McPherson
- Bruce Murray
- Glenn Myernick
- John O'Connell
- Andy Racz
- Bob Rigby
- Kyle Rote, Jr.

== Builder ==
On February 2, 2009, the Hall of Fame announced that none of the sixteen builder candidates had received enough votes for induction into the hall. The top five candidates are as follows:

- Bruce Arena
- Bob Gansler
- Francisco Marcos
- Tony DiCicco
- Robert Kraft

47.76%
46.27%
38.81%
35.82%
32.84%

The Builder's Screening Committee had selected the following fifteen candidates from a list of over 50 eligible candidates.

- Bruce Arena
- Chuck Blazer
- Bob Contiguglia
- Bill Cox
- Tony DiCicco
- Don Garber
- Bob Gansler
- Burton Haimes
- Robert Kraft
- Joe Machnick
- Francisco Marcos
- Fritz Marth
- Thom Meredith
- Kevin Payne
- David Socha
