= Bill Straub =

American soccer player

Cziotka Bill
Personal information
- Full name: William E. Straub
- Date of birth: August 11, 1951 (age 75)
- Place of birth: Philadelphia, Pennsylvania, United States
- Height: 6 ft 1 in (1.85 m)
- Position: Midfielder

Youth career
- 1970–1972: University of Pennsylvania

Senior career*
Years	Team	Apps	(Gls)
1973	Montreal Olympique	6	(1)
1973–1976	Philadelphia Atoms	39	(1)
1978	Philadelphia Fury	25	(0)

International career
1975	United States	3	(0)
- * Club domestic league appearances and goals

William Straub (born August 11, 1951) is a former U.S. soccer player. He spent five seasons in the North American Soccer League. He also earned three caps with the United States in 1975.

== College ==
Straub attended the University of Pennsylvania where he played on the men's soccer team from 1970 to 1972. He was a third team All-American in 1972. In 2005, he was named to the University of Pennsylvania All Century soccer team.

== NASL ==
In 1973, Straub was drafted by the Montreal Olympique. After only six games, the Olympique traded him to the expansion Philadelphia Atoms. He did not play a game with the Atoms until the championship game. In that game, he replaced Jim Fryatt, who had been on loan from English team Southport F.C. at forward when Southport recalled Fryatt. Straub went on to score the second goal of the Atoms' 2–0 win with an 85th-minute header, to secure the 1973 NASL championship. He missed the entire 1977 season with injuries, but came back in 1978 to play twenty-five games for the expansion Philadelphia Fury. After one season with the Fury, he retired in 1979.

== National team ==
Straub earned three caps with the United States men's national soccer team at the 1975 Mexico City Cup. On August 19, 1975, he played his first game with the U.S. in a 3–1 loss to Costa Rica. Two days later, the U.S. lost, 6–0, to Argentina. His last game was a 2–0 loss to Mexico on August 24. While he started and played every minute of the first two games, in the third game, he came on for Archie Roboostoff in the 87th minute.
