= 1976 North American Soccer League season =

Soccer league season

North American Soccer League 1976 season
- Season: 1976
- Teams: 20
- Champions: Toronto Metros-Croatia
- Premiers: Tampa Bay Rowdies
- Matches: 240
- Goals: 760 (3.17 per match)
- Top goalscorer: (South Africa) Derek Smethurst (20 goals)
- Highest attendance: 58,218 (NY @ Seattle)
- Lowest attendance: 531 (Chicago @ Boston)
- Average attendance: 10,295

Statistics of North American Soccer League in season 1976. This was the 9th season of the NASL.

== Overview ==
The league's twenty teams were divided into two conferences (Atlantic or Pacific), playing a total of 240 matches. Each team's 24 matches were divided between a round-robin with other teams in the same conference and six matches against different teams in the other conference. Points were awarded for wins (six) and each goal (up to three) regardless of results; ties in regulation were decided by 15 minutes of sudden death overtime followed by a penalty shootout from 35 yards (105 ft). The playoffs were expanded from eight to twelve teams with automatic berths for the top two teams in each of the four divisions and two wild card slots per conference for the remaining best finishing teams.

The Toronto Metros-Croatia defeated the Minnesota Kicks in the Soccer Bowl on August 28 to win the championship. The match was hosted at the Kingdome in Seattle, the new home of the Seattle Sounders. The Tampa Bay Rowdies finished the regular season with the best record, giving them consecutive titles in three different domestic NASL competitions. Though not in a calendar year, within 12 months they won the Soccer Bowl in August 1975, the NASL indoor cup in March 1976, and the regular season shield or premiership in August 1976. Since NASL teams at that time did not participate in the U.S. Open Cup, this would be the closest one would ever come to achieving any sort of a North American treble.

== Changes from the previous season ==
=== New teams ===
- None

=== Teams folding ===
- None

=== Teams moving ===
- Baltimore Comets to San Diego Jaws
- Denver Dynamos to Minnesota Kicks

=== Name changes ===
- None

== Map of clubs ==
Northern Division Eastern Division Southern Division Western Division

== Regular season ==
Pld = Played, W = Wins, L = Losses, GF = Goals For, GA = Goals Against, GD = Goal Differential, BP = Bonus Points, Pts= total points

6 points for a win, 1 point for a shootout win, 0 points for a loss, 1 point for each regulation goal scored up to three per game.

-Premiers (most points). -Other playoff teams.

=== Atlantic Conference ===
Northern Division
Team	Pld	W	L	GF	GA	GD	BP	Pts
Chicago Sting	24	15	9	52	32	+20	42	132
Toronto Metros-Croatia	24	15	9	38	30	+8	33	123
Rochester Lancers	24	13	11	36	32	+4	36	114
Hartford Bicentennials	24	12	12	37	56	−19	35	107
Boston Minutemen	24	7	17	35	64	−29	32	74

Eastern Division
Team	Pld	W	L	GF	GA	GD	BP	Pts
Tampa Bay Rowdies	24	18	6	58	30	+28	46	154
New York Cosmos	24	16	8	65	34	+31	52	148
Washington Diplomats	24	14	10	46	38	+8	42	126
Philadelphia Atoms	24	8	16	32	49	−17	32	80
Miami Toros	24	6	18	29	58	−29	27	63

=== Pacific Conference ===
Western Division
Team	Pld	W	L	GF	GA	GD	BP	Pts
Minnesota Kicks	24	15	9	54	33	+21	48	138
Seattle Sounders	24	14	10	40	31	+9	39	123
Vancouver Whitecaps	24	14	10	38	30	+8	36	120
Portland Timbers	24	8	16	23	41	−18	23	71
St. Louis Stars	24	5	19	29	57	−28	28	58

Southern Division
Team	Pld	W	L	GF	GA	GD	BP	Pts
San Jose Earthquakes	24	14	10	47	30	+17	39	123
Dallas Tornado	24	13	11	44	45	−1	39	117
Los Angeles Aztecs	24	12	12	43	44	−1	36	108
San Antonio Thunder	24	12	12	38	32	+6	35	107
San Diego Jaws	24	9	15	29	47	−18	28	82

== NASL All-Stars ==
First Team	Position	Second Team	Honorable Mention
(United States) Arnie Mausser, Tampa Bay	G	(Scotland) Eric Martin, Washington	(Italy) Paolo Cimpiel, Toronto
(England) Keith Eddy, New York	D	(England) Stewart Jump, Tampa Bay	(Scotland) Dave Gillett, Seattle
(England) Bobby Moore, San Antonio	D	(England) George Ley, Dallas	(England) Frank Spraggon, Minnesota
(England) Tommy Smith, Tampa Bay	D	(England) Ron Webster, Minnesota	(Scotland) Jim Holton, Miami
(Wales) Mike England, Seattle	D	(United States) Bob Smith, Philadelphia	(Canada) Bruce Wilson, Vancouver
(England) Rodney Marsh, Tampa Bay	M	(England) Alan West, Minnesota	(Northern Ireland) Dave Clements, New York
(Peru) Ramón Mifflin, New York	M	(Scotland) Bobby Hope, Dallas	(Germany) Wolfgang Sühnholz, Toronto
(Portugal) António Simões, San Jose	M	(United States) Al Trost, St. Louis	(Scotland) Charlie Cooke, Los Angeles
(Brazil) Pelé, New York	F	(South Africa) Derek Smethurst, Tampa Bay	(Scotland) Jimmy Robertson, Seattle
(Northern Ireland) George Best, Los Angeles	F	(England) Jeff Bourne, Dallas	(United States) Mark Liveric, San Jose
(Italy) Giorgio Chinaglia, New York	F	(Scotland) Stewart Scullion, Tampa Bay	(England) Tommy Ord, Vancouver

== Playoffs ==
All playoff games in all rounds including Soccer Bowl '76 were single game elimination match ups.

=== Bracket ===
First Round	Division Championships
E2	New York Cosmos	2
E3	Washington Diplomats	0
E1	Tampa Bay Rowdies	3
E2	New York Cosmos	1
Atlantic Conference
N2	Toronto Metros-Croatia	2
N3	Rochester Lancers	1
N1	Chicago Sting	2(1)
N2	Toronto Metros-Croatia	2(3)
S2	Dallas Tornado	2
S3	Los Angeles Aztecs	0
S1	San Jose Earthquakes	2
S2	Dallas Tornado	0
Pacific Conference
W2	Seattle Sounders	1
W3	Vancouver Whitecaps	0
W1	Minnesota Kicks	3
W2	Seattle Sounders	0

Conference Championships
E1	Tampa Bay Rowdies	0
N2	Toronto Metros-Croatia	2
S1	San Jose Earthquakes	1
W1	Minnesota Kicks	3

Soccer Bowl '76
N2	Toronto Metros-Croatia	3
W1	Minnesota Kicks	0

=== First round ===
August 17	Washington Diplomats	0–2	New York Cosmos	Shea Stadium • Att. 22,698

August 18	Los Angeles Aztecs	0–2	Dallas Tornado	Ownby Stadium • Att. 9,413

August 18	Vancouver Whitecaps	0–1	Seattle Sounders	Kingdome • Att. 30,406

August 18	Rochester Lancers	1–2	Toronto Metros-Croatia	Varsity Stadium • Att. 6,852

=== Conference semifinals ===
August 20	Toronto Metros-Croatia	3–2 (PK, 3–1)	Chicago Sting	Soldier Field • Att. 8,150

August 20	New York Cosmos	1–3	Tampa Bay Rowdies	Tampa Stadium • Att. 36,863

August 20	Dallas Tornado	0–2	San Jose Earthquakes	Spartan Stadium • Att. 15,135

August 21	Seattle Sounders	0–3	Minnesota Kicks	Metropolitan Stadium • Att. 41,405

=== Conference Championships ===
August 24	Toronto Metros-Croatia	2–0	Tampa Bay Rowdies	Tampa Stadium • Att. 28,046

August 25	San Jose Earthquakes	1–3	Minnesota Kicks	Metropolitan Stadium • Att. 49,572

=== Soccer Bowl '76 ===
August 28

Toronto Metros-Croatia	3–0	Minnesota Kicks
Eusébio (40:28); Lukačević (53:57); Ferriera (82:43)

Kingdome, Seattle
Attendance: 25,765
Referee: Gordon Hill (England)

1976 NASL Champions: Toronto Metros-Croatia

== Post season awards ==
- Most Valuable Player: (Brazil) Pelé, New York
- Coach of the year: (Italy) Eddie Firmani, Tampa Bay
- Rookie of the year: (United States) Steve Pecher, Dallas
- North American Player of the Year: (United States) Arnie Mausser, Tampa Bay

== Attendances ==
Club	Games	Total	Average
Seattle Sounders	12	285,941	23,828
Minnesota Kicks	12	277,404	23,117
Portland Timbers	12	241,996	20,166
San Jose Earthquakes	12	231,338	19,278
New York Cosmos	12	218,719	18,227
Tampa Bay Rowdies	12	197,429	16,452
Dallas Tornado	12	169,113	14,093
Vancouver Whitecaps	12	103,877	8,656
Los Angeles Aztecs	12	96,606	8,051
San Diego Jaws	12	73,822	6,152
St. Louis Stars	12	73,795	6,150
Washington Diplomats	12	71,554	5,963
Philadelphia Atoms	12	67,413	5,618
Chicago Sting	12	66,933	5,578
Toronto Metros	12	66,663	5,555
Rochester Lancers	12	61,906	5,159
San Antonio Thunder	12	57,524	4,794
Hartford Bicentennials	12	41,037	3,420
Miami Toros	12	36,843	3,070
Boston Minutemen	12	30,971	2,581
