= Al Miller (soccer) =

American soccer coach

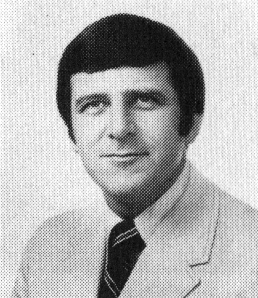
- Miller circa 1975

Personal information
- Full name: Al Miller
- Date of birth: December 17, 1936 (age 89)
- Place of birth: Lebanon, Pennsylvania, United States
- Position: Midfielder

College career
Years	Team	Apps	(Gls)
1956–1959	East Stroudsburg Warriors		

Managerial career
- 1961–1966: New Paltz State
- 1967–1972: Hartwick College
- 1973–1975: Philadelphia Atoms
- 1975: United States
- 1976–1980: Dallas Tornado
- 1980–1981: Calgary Boomers
- 1983: Tampa Bay Rowdies

Al Miller (born December 17, 1936) is an American former collegiate and professional soccer coach. After leaving coaching, he then became a general manager for two indoor soccer clubs in Cleveland, Ohio. He is a member of the National Soccer Hall of Fame.

== Youth ==
Miller was born in Lebanon, Pennsylvania and grew up in Ono, Pennsylvania. He attended East Stroudsburg State College where he played on both the soccer and basketball teams. He was a midfielder who earned second team All American recognition in 1958 and 1959.

== Coaching ==
=== Collegiate ===
While he starred as a soccer and basketball player, his first job was as the Albright College golf coach. He gained his first soccer coaching position with New Paltz State. He spent five years with the New Paltz, winning three New York Conference Championships.

In 1967, Hartwick College hired Miller. In his six seasons at Hartwick, he took the team to a 64–12–3 record and a 1970 Final Four appearance.

=== NASL ===
Several events led to Miller moving from the collegiate to the professional coaching ranks. Tom McCloskey, a wealthy Philadelphia businessman was interested in owning a professional sports team. While attending the 1973 Super Bowl, Lamar Hunt broached the subject of McCloskey starting a North American Soccer League (NASL) franchise in Philly. The NASL awarded McCloskey a team to begin play in the 1973 season. With very little time to prepare, McCloskey, and his general manager Bob Ehlinger, hired Miller who was both a successful collegiate soccer coach and from the Philadelphia area, as the Philadelphia Atoms first coach.

Miller decided to build the Atoms around a core of native U.S. players. This was significant in that most NASL teams used U.S. players as goalkeepers or bench warmers. Miller took Bob Rigby with the first pick in the 1973 NASL college draft. Rigby went on to become one of the best goalkeepers in the NASL. In the second round, Miller selected Bobby Smith who was selected as a second team All Star his rookie year. Miller then took his team to England to train. While there noticed several players who he thought could help his team. He negotiated an on loan arrangement for Andy Provan, Jim Fryatt and Chris Dunleavy.

The selection of Miller proved to be a significant advantage for the Atoms. His decision to use U.S. players made the team immediately popular in Philadelphia. Miller was also personable became media darling. Besides creating a team popular with the fans, Miller also created a talented team which ran to a 9–2–8 record and a spot in the playoffs. In the semifinals, the Atoms crushed the Toronto Metros 3–0, then easily handled the Dallas Tornado 2–0, to take the 1973 NASL title. (Miller was named NASL Coach of the Year, the only US-born manager to win that award in the league's 17-year history.)

Miller continued his contributions to U.S. soccer when he brought Francisco Marcos into the Atoms. Marcos had played at Hartwick when Miller coached there and Miller now gave Marcos his first taste in soccer management, a skill he would develop over years in the NASL, then as the founder of the United Soccer Leagues.

In 1974, McCloskey promoted Miller to general manager, a position he held in addition to his coaching duties. In 1975, he drafted Chris Bahr who became the 1975 NASL Rookie of the Year and later became a standout National Football League placekicker.

Miller was unable to replicate his 1974 success and the team slowly became a drain on McCloskey's finances. In 1975, he sold the team to a Mexican group. With the change in ownership, Miller elected to move to the Dallas Tornado. He spent the 1976 through 1980 season with the Tornado, gaining the playoff semifinals in 1980. After Dallas lost that semifinal match with the New York Cosmos, Miller announced his resignation as coach in the locker room. While with Dallas, Miller had a hand in giving another significant individual his start when he drafted Glenn Myernick with the first pick of the 1976 College Draft.

He then moved to the Calgary Boomers, taking them into the playoffs in 1981. The Boomers folded at the end of the season and Miller found himself without a team until hired by the Tampa Bay Rowdies during the 1982 season. During the winter he guided the Rowdies to their third indoor title in 1983. In doing so he joined Eddie Firmani and Ron Newman as the only coaches to win NASL titles in both the outdoor league and the indoor variant. His indoor success with the Rowdies did not translate outdoors however, as the team finished 7–23. He resigned on October 5, 1983, after disagreements with the team's management.

=== National team ===
When Dettmar Cramer, the first-ever full-time head coach of the U.S. national team, quit in 1975, he was replaced by Miller on an interim basis. Miller's tenure was brief, only two matches: in a home-and-home series of friendlies against Poland, the U.S. was crushed 7–0 in Poznań and 4–0 in Seattle. Manfred Schellscheidt, one of Miller's players on the Atoms, took over the job that summer.

== General manager ==
After leaving the Tampa Bay Rowdies, Miller never again coached a professional team. Instead he entered team management with the Cleveland Force of Major Indoor Soccer League (MISL). He oversaw the Force from 1984 until it folded at the end of the 1987–1988 season.

He then moved on to become the general manager of the United States Soccer Federation for a year. On February 22, 1989, Cleveland was awarded a new MISL franchise, the Cleveland Crunch.
The Crunch hired Miller as its general manager, a position he held for the next ten years. In July 1992, the MISL folded and the Crunch moved to the National Professional Soccer League (NPSL). In Miller's ten years, the Crunch won three championships (1994 over St. Louis; 1996 over Kansas City; 1999 over Milwaukee) and lost another three title series (1991 to San Diego; 1993 and 1997, both to Kansas City).

== Media ==
ESPN later signed Miller as a color commentator on ESPN's Mundial Sports. He also has narrated a series of films on soccer and wrote a chapter in the book Winning Soccer.

East Stroudsburg University inducted Miller into its Athletic Hall of Fame in 1987. Hartwick college inducted Miller into its Hall of Fame in 1995. That same year, Miller was elected to the National Soccer Hall of Fame.

In 2008, Miller was inducted into the New Paltz Hall of Fame along with the 1965 Men's championship soccer team.

Miller made news headlines again in 2012 at the age of 75, when he survived an alligator attack while playing golf with two friends at the Lake Ashton Golf Course in Lake Wales, Florida.
