= Soccer Bowl '76 =

Soccer match

- Event: Soccer Bowl
Toronto Metros-Croatia	Minnesota Kicks
3	0
- Date: August 28, 1976
- Venue: Kingdome, Seattle, Washington
- Man of the Match: Wolfgang Sühnholz
- Referee: Gordon Hill (England)
- Attendance: 25,765

Soccer Bowl '76 was the championship final of the 1976 NASL season, between the Toronto Metros-Croatia and the Minnesota Kicks. The match was played on August 28, 1976, at the Kingdome, in Seattle, Washington. The Toronto Metros-Croatia won the match, 3–0, to claim their first North American championship.

== Background ==
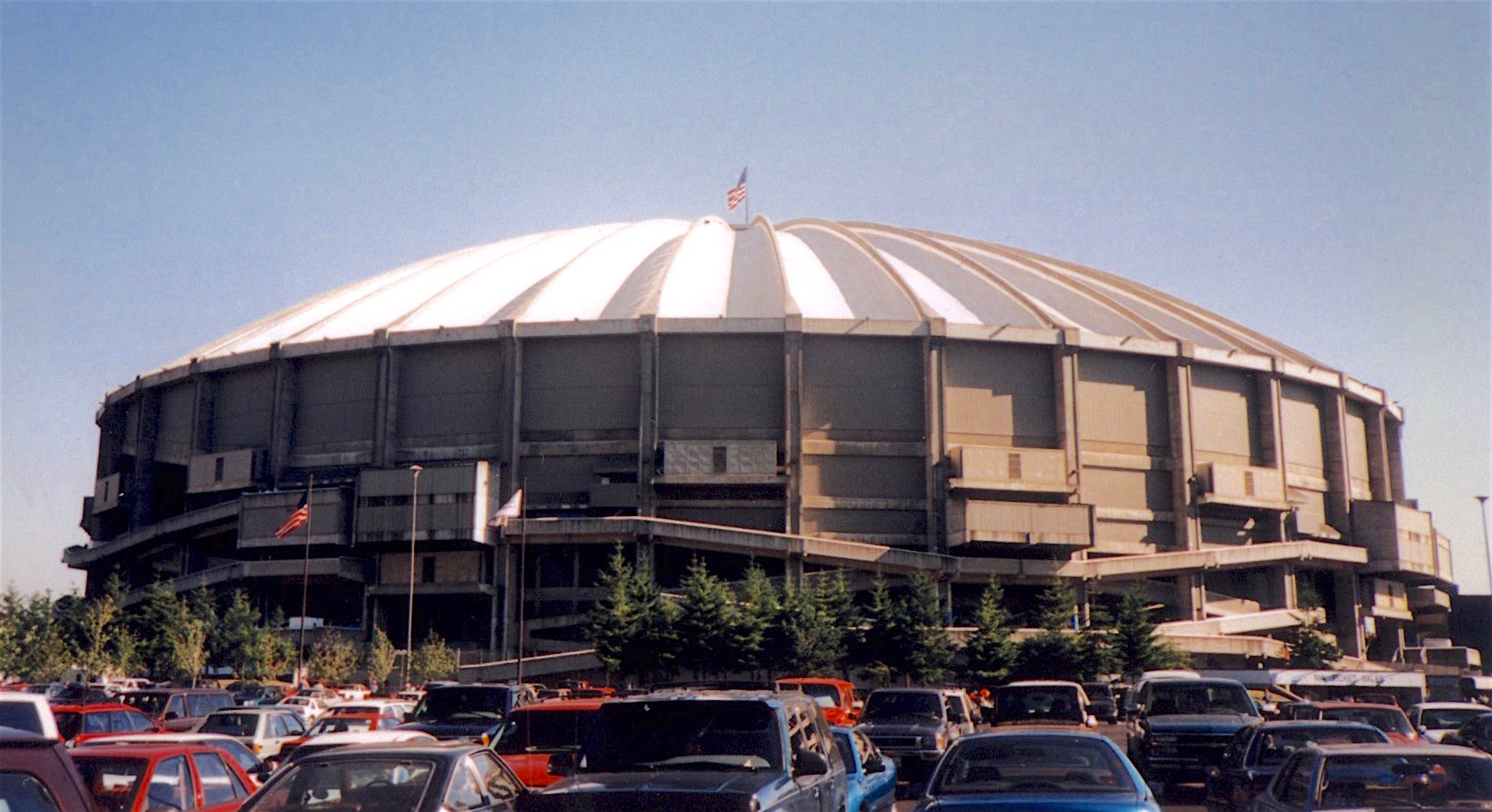
The Kingdome was the venue for Soccer Bowl '76

=== Toronto Metros-Croatia ===
The Toronto Metros-Croatia qualified for the playoffs by virtue of a second-place finish in the Northern Division with 123 points. Toronto defeated the Rochester Lancers in a first round match, 2–1, on August 18, 1976. Two days later in the conference semifinals they played the Northern Division champion Chicago Sting to a 2–2 draw, and advanced on penalties, 3–1. In the Atlantic Conference finals the Metros-Croatia upset the defending champion Tampa Bay Rowdies, 2–0, on August 24, 1976, to advance to the Soccer Bowl.

=== Minnesota Kicks ===
The Minnesota Kicks qualified for the playoffs by virtue of winning the Western Division with 138 points. The point total earned them the number one seed in the Pacific Conference and with it, a first round playoff bye. The Kicks defeated the Seattle Sounders in the conference semifinals, 3–0, on August 21, 1976. Four days later they downed the Southern Division champion San Jose Earthquakes, 3–1, in the Pacific Conference finals played on August 25, 1975, to advance to the Soccer Bowl.

== Match details ==
August 28
11:30 a.m. (PDT)

Toronto Metros-Croatia	3–0	Minnesota Kicks
Eusébio (40:28); Lukačević (53:57); Ferreira (82:43)	Report

Kingdome, Seattle
Attendance: 25,765
Referee: Gordon Hill (England)

Toronto Metros-Croatia	Minnesota Kicks

GK	1	(Canada) Željko Bilecki
DF	14	(Socialist Federal Republic of Yugoslavia) Damir Šutevski	Substituted off
DF	6	(Socialist Federal Republic of Yugoslavia) Mladen Cukon
DF	4	(Socialist Federal Republic of Yugoslavia) Filip Blašković
DF	2	(Canada) Robert Iarusci
MF	3	(Poland) Tadeusz Polak
MF	10	(Portugal) Eusébio (c)
MF	5	(Germany) Wolfgang Sühnholz
FW	11	(Brazil) Ivair Ferreira
FW	9	(Socialist Federal Republic of Yugoslavia) Ivan Lukačević
FW	12	(Socialist Federal Republic of Yugoslavia) Ivica Grnja
Substitutes:
MF	7	(Canada) Gene Strenicer	Substituted on
MF	8	(Canada) Carmine Marcantonio
DF	16	(Canada) Chris Horrocks
FW	18	(Canada) Bruno Pilaš
Manager:
(Socialist Federal Republic of Yugoslavia) Domagoj Kapetanović

GK	1	(England) Geoff Barnett
DF	5	(England) Steve Litt
DF	4	(England) Peter Brine
DF	6	(England) Alan Merrick (c)
DF	3	(England) Frank Spraggon
MF	11	(South Africa) Patrick Ntsoelengoe	Substituted off
MF	17	(United States) Sam Bick
MF	10	(England) Alan West
FW	21	(England) Ade Coker
FW	18	(England) Ron Futcher
FW	9	(England) Alan Willey
Substitutes:
DF	2	(England) Ron Webster
FW	7	(United States) Mike Flater
MF	8	(United States) Tom Howe	Substituted on
DF	12	(England) Peter Short
Manager:
(England) Freddie Goodwin

1976 NASL Champions: Toronto Metros-Croatia

Soccer Bowl MVP:
Wolfgang Sühnholz (Toronto)

Assistant referees:

Television: CBS, CBC
Announcers: Jon Miller

== Statistics ==
Overall
Statistic	Toronto	Minnesota
Goals scored	3	0
Total shots	17	15
On target	11	6
Saves	6	8
Yellow cards	?	?
Red cards	0	0

== See also ==
- 1976 North American Soccer League season
