= Philadelphia Fury (1978–1980) =

Defunct American soccer club

- Full name: Philadelphia Fury
- Nickname: Fury
- Founded: 1978
- Dissolved: 1980
- Stadium: Veterans Stadium
- Capacity: 60,000
- League: North American Soccer League
Home colors	Away colors

The Philadelphia Fury was an American soccer team that competed in the North American Soccer League (NASL) from 1978 to 1980. The team was based in Philadelphia, Pennsylvania and played their home games at Veterans Stadium. The team's ownership group included rock musicians Rick Wakeman, Peter Frampton, Mick Jagger, and Paul Simon. During the team's three years of play in Philadelphia it never had a winning record, but qualified for, and advanced to the second round, of the 1979 playoffs. After the 1980 NASL season, the team was sold and moved to Montreal, rebranding as the Montreal Manic.

== History ==
=== Origins and inaugural season ===
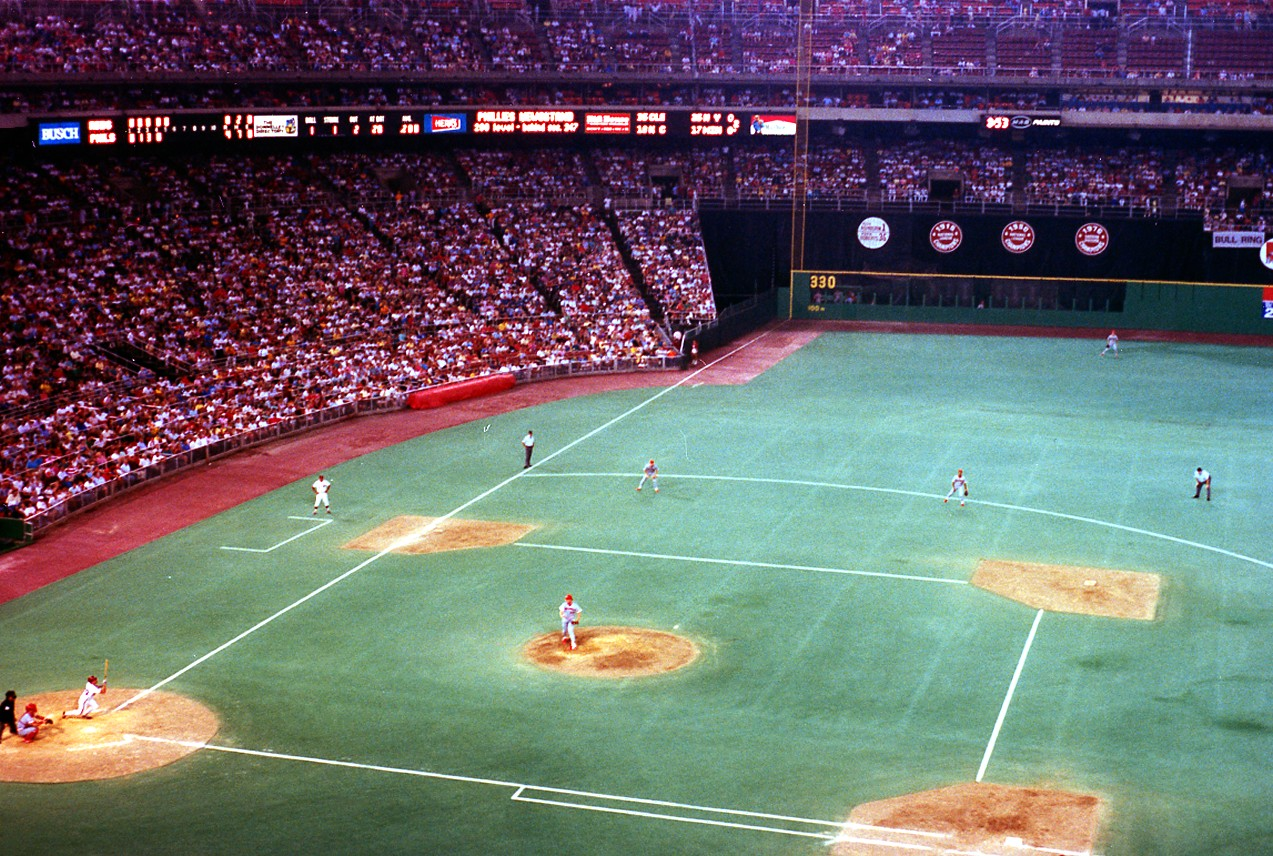
The Fury played their home matches at Philadelphia's Veterans Stadium

Philadelphia had previously been represented in the North American Soccer League (NASL) by the Philadelphia Atoms starting in 1973 with the team winning the NASL Final in its first year, but the team folded after the 1976 season concluded and a move to San Antonio did not come to fruition. In November 1977, Philadelphia was announced as the location of the NASL's twenty-second franchise for the upcoming 1978 season with Rick Wakeman, Peter Frampton, Mick Jagger, and Paul Simon announced as members of the ownership group. Bob Ehlinger, former NASL deputy commissioner and the former general manager of the Atoms was appointed general manager and executive vice president of the new team. The following month, Rick Wakeman and former Yes manager Brian Lane led a press conference announcing the team would be known as the Fury and that former Newcastle United F.C. manager Richard Dinnis had been hired to be the team's head coach. The organization also announced that it had reached a financial settlement with original Atoms owner Thomas McCloskey and intended to settle approximately $90,000 remaining outstanding debts owed by the previous franchise. During the press conference, former Chelsea and Southampton striker Peter Osgood was introduced as the team's first signing. In January 1978, the Fury signed Irish midfielder Johnny Giles and a week before the season Southampton Midfielder Alan Ball and former Chelsea F.C. center back John Dempsey were brought into the club. In June 1978 and the team in last place with a record of six wins and ten losses, Dinnis resigned his position as head coach. A few days later midfielder Alan Ball was named player-coach as his replacement. The team's penultimate game of the season ended in controversy with Pierce O'Leary, on loan from Ireland's Shamrock Rovers F.C., attempted to attack referee George Courtney after Toronto Metros-Croatia striker Sead Sušić scored a goal in sudden death overtime. The Fury finished the season in last place of the Eastern Division of the American Conference with a record of twelve wins and eighteen losses. The team set a league record of 527-plus minutes without scoring a goal and were shutout a record twelve times during the season.

=== Second season and playoffs ===
On February 16, 1979, former Yugoslavia national team coach Marko Valok was announced as the team's new head coach. During the offseason, GM Ehlinger brought in goalkeeper Keith Van Eron from the Houston Hurricane, striker Davie Robb from the Tampa Bay Rowdies and four Yugoslav players, including Niki Nikolic who came in a deal from the Tulsa Roughnecks along with Englishmen Jimmy Redfern. As of the team's home opener on March 31, 1979, only four players from the previous seasons' roster were still on the team, including John Dempsey. Alan Ball agreed to return after Southampton was defeated by Nottingham Forest in the 1978–79 Football League Cup, but only play eight games for the team before his loan deal was sold to the Vancouver Whitecaps. On April 16, 1979, General Manager Bob Ehlinger resigned his position due to disagreements with the ownership group, Sam L'Hommedieu, a theater manager and concert promoter, was named as his interim replacement. In May 1979, England's First Division leading goal scorer Frank Worthington was brought over on loan from the Bolton Wanderers. On June 20, 1979, the Fury named Tom Fleck, youth coordinator for the United States Soccer Federation, as general manager. Despite the roster and management changes, the Fury ended the 1979 season with a losing record of ten wins and twenty losses, having lost all fifteen away matches. However, with the NASL standings based awarding teams six points for a win and one point for each regulation goal scored up to three per game, the Fury earned third place of the American Conference Eastern Division, finishing one point over the New England Tea Men who had won twelve games but only scored forty one goals, fourteen less, than the Fury for the season, and qualifying for the playoffs. The Fury defeated the Houston Hurricane at home 2-1 in the first leg of Conference Quarterfinals and beat the Hurricanes in Houston by the same score, the team's first road victory in fifteen attempts. The team was defeated in the Conference Semifinals by the Tampa Bay Rowdies two games to none. A few weeks later, Marko Valok resigned his position as head coach to return to Yugoslavia. John Dempsey was named NASL Co-Defender of Year. In October 1979, Eddie Firmani, former head coach of the 1975 NASL Champion Tampa Bay Rowdies and back-to-back 1977 and 1978 NASL champion New York Cosmos, was announced as the new Fury head coach with a three-year deal.

=== Third season and move ===
At the beginning of 1980, George O'Neill head coach of the Major Indoor Soccer League team the Philadelphia Fever and member of the NASL 1973 Championship winning Philadelphia Atoms was hired as an assistant coach. The roster was revamped again, with less than half of the previous season's roster returning. Davie Robb who had led the team in scoring the previous season as well as acting as team captain and voted team MVP was traded to the Vancouver Whitecaps. Notable additions to the squad brought in by Firmani included Netherlands national team forward Bobby Vosmaer, Đorđe Koković, and Andrew Parkinson. After training for two weeks in the Miami area, the Fury played two games against the Puerto Rico national team in Puerto Rico, winning both before opening the season against the Tampa Bay Rowdies. On May 17, 1980, it was reported that Molson Brewery was negotiating to purchase the team and move it to Montreal. Rumors of the move continued throughout the season. The Fury ended the 1980 season in last place of the with a record of ten wins and twenty-two losses. Managing director Larry Levine announced that if a local buyer could be found, the team would be sold to Molson. On October 6, 1980, NASL Commissioner Phil Woosnam announced the team ownership rights had been transferred to Molson and Montreal. The team had reportedly lost more than $3.1 million in its three seasons.

== Year-by-year ==
Year	Record	Regular season finish	Playoffs	Avg. Attend.
1978	12–18	4th, Eastern Division, American Conference	First Round	8,280
1979	10–20	3rd, Eastern Division, American Conference	American Conference Semifinals	5,626
1980	10–22	4th, Eastern Division, American Conference	Did not qualify	4,465

== Honors ==
NASL championships

- none

Division titles

- none

All-star selections

- 1978 Alan Ball (second team)

Defender of the year

- 1979 John Dempsey

U.S. Soccer Hall of Fame members

- 2007 Bobby Smith

== Head coaches ==
- (England) Richard Dinnis 1978
- (England) Alan Ball, Jr. 1978
- (Socialist Federal Republic of Yugoslavia) Marko Valok 1979
- (South Africa) (Italy) Eddie Firmani 1980

== Legacy ==
In February 2014 it was announced that the Philadelphia Fury would compete in the inaugural season of the new American Soccer League (ASL) after being purchased by former MLS Assistant Coach and ASL CEO, Matt Driver. The new Fury carry the colors of the original team but played home games at Washington Township High School in New Jersey.

== See also ==
- Philadelphia Atoms
- Philadelphia Union
- Philadelphia Spartans
- Montreal Manic
