= 5th Soccer Bowl =

The 5th Soccer Bowl may refer to:

- NASL Final 1973, the fifth championship game of the original North American Soccer League
- Soccer Bowl '79, the fifth championship game of the original North American Soccer League that used the "Soccer Bowl" moniker
- Soccer Bowl 2015, the fifth championship game of the second North American Soccer League
