= Derek Trevis =

English footballer (1942–2000)

Personal information
- Full name: Derek Alan Trevis
- Date of birth: 9 September 1942
- Place of birth: Birmingham, England
- Date of death: 21 December 2000 (aged 58)
- Place of death: Sacramento, CA, United States
- Position: Midfielder

Senior career*
Years	Team	Apps	(Gls)
1962–1963	Aston Villa	0	(0)
1963–1968	Colchester United	196	(13)
1968–1970	Walsall	65	(5)
1970–1973	Lincoln City	108	(18)
1973	Stockport County	35	(2)
1973–1975	Philadelphia Atoms	61	(0)
1976	San Diego Jaws	15	(1)
1977	Las Vegas Quicksilvers	6	(0)
1978	Philadelphia Fury	4	(1)
Total		490	(40)

Managerial career
- 1976: San Diego Jaws
- 1977: Las Vegas Quicksilvers
- * Club domestic league appearances and goals

Derek Alan Trevis (9 September 1942 – 21 December 2000) was an English professional footballer who played as a midfielder. Active in both England and the United States, Trevis made nearly 500 career league appearances.

== Career ==
Born in Birmingham, Trevis began his professional career in 1962 with hometown club Aston Villa. Trevis also played in the Football League for Colchester United, Walsall, Lincoln City and Stockport County, before moving to the United States to play in the North American Soccer League. He signed with the Philadelphia Atoms, captaining the team and leading it to the 1973 NASL Championship. He was player-coach with the San Diego Jaws and the Las Vegas Quicksilvers.

== Honors ==
Philadelphia Fury

- North American Soccer League season 1973
