= 8th Soccer Bowl =

The 8th Soccer Bowl may refer to:

- Soccer Bowl '76, the eighth championship game of the original North American Soccer League
- Soccer Bowl '82, the eighth championship game of the original North American Soccer League that used the "Soccer Bowl" moniker
