= Abbadia El Mustapha =

Moroccan footballer

Personal information
- Place of birth: Morocco
- Height: 5 ft 11 in (1.80 m)
- Position: Forward

Senior career*
Years	Team	Apps	(Gls)
1972	Montreal Olympique	5	(1)
Total		5	(1)
- * Club domestic league appearances and goals

Abbadia El Mustapha is a former Moroccan soccer player who played in the NASL.

== Career statistics ==
=== Club ===
Club	Season	League			Cup		Other		Total	
Club	Season	Division	Apps	Goals	Apps	Goals	Apps	Goals	Apps	Goals
Montreal Olympique	1972	NASL	5	1	0	0	0	0	5	1
Career total			5	1	0	0	0	0	5	1
