= Ed Gettemeier =

American soccer player (born 1959)

Personal information
- Date of birth: November 29, 1959 (age 66)
- Place of birth: St. Louis, Missouri, United States
- Position: Goalkeeper

Youth career
- 1979–1982: Southern Illinois University Edwardsville

Senior career*
Years	Team	Apps	(Gls)
1983	Montreal Manic	15	(0)
1983–1984	Chicago Sting (indoor)	3	(0)
1984	Chicago Sting	6	(0)
1984–1986	St. Louis Steamers (indoor)	26	(0)
1986–1989	Kansas City Comets (indoor)	67	(0)
Total		117	(0)

Managerial career
- 1989: Southern Illinois University Edwardsville (assistant)
- * Club domestic league appearances and goals

Ed Gettemeier (born November 29, 1959) is an American retired soccer goalkeeper who played professionally in the North American Soccer League and Major Indoor Soccer League.

== Youth ==
Gettemeier attended Southern Illinois University Edwardsville where he played on the men's soccer team from 1979 to 1982. In 1979, he was the winning goalkeeper in SIUE's National Championship victory over Clemson University played in Tampa Stadium. In 1980 and 1981 Gettemeier was a member of the Busch Soccer Club Team that won two consecutive National Titles in the United States Soccer Federation's Open Cup Championships. He was a 1982 Second Team All American.

== Professional ==
In 1983, Gettemeier turned professional with the Montreal Manic of the North American Soccer League. He was named the teams "Players Player of the Year" due to a stretch run in the playoffs where he earned a number of defensive player of the game honors. The highlight of the season came when Montreal upset the NASL power New York Cosmos winning in New York and then again in a shootout in Montreal. Unfortunately for Gettemeier the Manic folded and his contract was purchased by the Chicago Sting. In 1984, he was a member of the Soccer Bowl Champion Chicago Sting. Unhappy with his playing time Gettemeier requested to be released from his contract. The Sting released him in October 1984. He then signed as a free agent with the St. Louis Steamers of the Major Indoor Soccer League. He played two seasons (one year contract plus one year option) with the Steamers and became a free agent at the end of the 1985–1986 season when the Steamers and Gettemeier could not agree to contract terms. In July 1986, he joined the Kansas City Comets. He played for the Comets until 1989.

In 1989, Gettemeier became the goalkeeper coach with Southern Illinois University Edwardsville. In 2008 Gettemeier was inducted into the SIUE Athletics Hall of Fame. In 2011 Gettemeier was inducted into the St. Louis Soccer Hall of Fame.
