= Graham Adams =

English footballer and coach (1933–2020)

Personal information
- Full name: Graham Wallace Adams
- Date of birth: 1 March 1933
- Place of birth: Torrington, Devon, England
- Date of death: 14 February 2020 (aged 86)
- Place of death: 100 Mile House, British Columbia, Canada

Senior career*
Years	Team	Apps	(Gls)
	Plymouth Argyle	1	(0)
- Oxford United

Managerial career
- 1961–1962: Wycombe Wanderers
- 1971–1972: South Korea (assistant)
- 1972–1973: Montreal Olympique
- 1974: Quebec Selects
- * Club domestic league appearances and goals

Graham Adams (1 March 1933 – 14 February 2020) was a football player and football coach. During his career as a player, he played for Plymouth Argyle F.C. and Oxford United F.C.

In September 1961 he was appointed coach of the then amateur club Wycombe Wanderers F.C. - a position he held until the end of the season. In 1971, he became the first foreign South Korea national football team assistant coach and technical advisor.(March 1971 ~ February 1972) After his coaching career in South Korea, he was appointed manager of the Montreal Olympique. In 1967, he led the Bermuda national football team to a silver medal at the Pan American Games. In 1974, he was the head coach for the Quebec Selects in the National Soccer League.

He died on February 14, 2020.
