= Gordon Hill (referee) =

English football referee (1928–2019)

- Full name: Gordon Wilkinson Hill
- Born: 8 July 1928; Bolton, Lancashire, England
- Died: 21 March 2019 (aged 90); Exeter, England, United Kingdom
- Other occupation: Teacher

Domestic
Years	League	Role
1960–1966	Football League	Linesman
1966–1975	Football League	Referee

Gordon Wilkinson Hill (8 July 1928 – 21 March 2019) was an English football referee in the Football League. He originally came from Bolton, Lancashire.

== Early life ==
In his early years he attended St. Simon and St Jude's C of E School, Great Lever in Bolton. He later moved to Waterfoot, Rossendale in Lancashire and attended Bacup and Rawtenstall Grammar School from 1936. Upon leaving school in 1946, he moved to London to train as a teacher for two years. He returned to Lancashire to take up his teaching career, briefly, in Bacup. After an 18-month spell of compulsory National Service, he taught in Bury from 1950 to 1955, then returned to teach in Bacup until 1960, and subsequently moved to a post in Scunthorpe, Lincolnshire, until his re-location to Leicester in 1966. Here he became the first headteacher of the new Stafford Leys Country Primary School in Leicester Forest East before taking up a similar post at Mount Grace High School in the nearby town of Hinckley. He remained at Mount Grace until he relocated to take up a teaching post in Plymouth, Michigan in the U.S. in 1975. His liberal approach to refereeing was also evident in his approach to teaching, where he was happy to be called progressive in his approach.

== Career ==
Hill spent six years on the line before progressing to the list of Football League referees. Shortly after, he moved to Leicester, and remained there for the rest of his refereeing career. He quickly established himself and on 14 March 1970 took charge of the FA Cup semi-final between Chelsea (the eventual Cup winners) and Watford at White Hart Lane. Despite his strong profile of games, Hill never made the FIFA List, and he remarked in his 1975 autobiography, "Give a little Whistle: The Recollections of a Remarkable Referee", that this may have been due to his non-conformist approach. He continued, however, to handle key games. In 1973, he controlled the Charity Shield match between Manchester City and Burnley. Late that season, in April 1974, he was in charge of Burnley again during the FA Cup semi-final in which Newcastle defeated them 2–0.

1974–75 was Hill's final season and was marked by his most senior match – the League Cup Final between Aston Villa and Norwich City at Wembley on 1 March 1975. Villa won when Ray Graydon scored from the rebound after Kevin Keelan had saved his penalty. Shortly after, he reached the retirement age (then forty-seven) for referees. He decided at this time to give up his post as headteacher at a school in Leicester and leave the UK to take up another teaching post in the United States. While there, he served as a North American Soccer League referee in 1975 and 1976, as well as the league's Director of Officials. He was the referee for Soccer Bowl '76 won by Toronto Metros-Croatia. Following the 1976 NASL season he worked for many years as the Tampa Bay Rowdies' Director of Youth and Community Development. He also provided local radio and television commentary during Rowdies broadcasts for several seasons.

He outlived two wives, Audrey Hill, and Nancy Hill; and was the father of sons, Matthew and Martin; and daughters, Lucy and Katie. In his later years he returned to England and before his death became an accomplished artist.
