= Mike Dillon (footballer) =

English footballer (born 1952)

Personal information
- Full name: Michael Leslie Dillon
- Date of birth: 29 September 1952 (age 74)
- Place of birth: Highgate, England
- Position: Central defender

Senior career*
Years	Team	Apps	(Gls)
1969–1974	Tottenham Hotspur	24	(1)
1972	→ Montreal Olympique (loan)	10	(7)
1974–1975	→ Millwall (loan)	4	(0)
1975	→ Swindon Town (loan)	9	(0)
1975–1977	New York Cosmos	41	(3)
1977–1978	→ Cheshunt (loan)	15	(0)
1978–1979	Washington Diplomats	47	(1)
Total		150	(12)

International career
1968	England Schoolboys	3	(0)
1971	England Youth	6	(0)

Managerial career
- 1981–1983: Georgetown Hoyas
- * Club domestic league appearances and goals

Michael Dillon (born 29 September 1952) is a former professional footballer who played as a central defender for Tottenham Hotspur, Millwall, Swindon, Montreal Olympique, New York Cosmos, Washington Diplomats and represented England at schoolboy and youth level.

== Playing career ==
Dillon joined Tottenham Hotspur as an apprentice in December 1969. He played 29 times in all competitions including three as a substitute and scored one goal between 1972 and 1974. The highlight of Dillon's career at Spurs was a substitute appearance in the First leg of the 1974 UEFA Cup Final against Feyenoord at White Hart Lane. In December 1974 he joined Millwall in a loan deal and went on to make four appearances for the club before joining Swindon Town on loan in March 1975 where he featured in nine matches including two as sub.

Dillon had three spells in the North American Soccer League (NASL). In 1972 with Montreal Olympique, between 1975 and 1977 he played for New York Cosmos (1970–85) alongside Pelé and Giorgio Chinaglia before ending his career at Washington Diplomats in 1978–79. During the autumn of 1977, Mike Dillon joined his brother Tommy at Isthmian League side Cheshunt on loan where he faced former Spurs teammate Jimmy Greaves, then playing for Barnet during a Herts Senior Cup tie before returning to America.

== Coaching career ==
Dillon was the head coach of Georgetown Hoyas soccer team.

== After football ==
Dillon used to own a post office in the village of Moulton close to the Cambridgeshire–Suffolk border. However, recently he has moved to Northern Ireland with his Irish wife to live out the rest of his days.
