= Domagoj Kapetanović =

Croatian football manager and player (1926–2005)

Personal information
- Date of birth: 30 January 1926
- Place of birth: Ljubuški, Kingdom of SCS
- Date of death: January 2005 (aged 78–79)
- Place of death: Zagreb, Croatia
- Position: Midfielder

Youth career
- Concordija
- 1938–1945: Građanski

Senior career*
Years	Team	Apps	(Gls)
1946–1947	Partizan	0	(0)
1947–1952	Lokomotiva		
1952–1954	Dinamo Zagreb		
1955–1959	Metalac		

Managerial career
- 1965–1966: Velež Mostar
- 1967–1968: Zagreb
- 1968–1971: OFI
- 1971–1972: Segesta
- 1973: Dinamo Zagreb
- 1975: Al-Ahly
- 1976: Toronto Metros-Croatia
- 1976–1977: Osijek
- 1978: Toronto Metros-Croatia
- 1979: Segesta
- 1980–1985: Sydney United
- 1985–1988: Melbourne Croatia
- * Club domestic league appearances and goals

Domagoj Kapetanović (30 January 1926 – January 2005) was a Yugoslav football player and manager best known for winning the 1976 NASL Championship with Toronto Metros-Croatia.

== Playing career ==
Kapetanović started his playing career with Građanski. After the club was disbanded by a decree of the communist authorities in 1945, he was one of several Građanski players who went on to join the Belgrade-based FK Partizan, along with Franjo Glaser, Zlatko Čajkovski, Stjepan Bobek, Miroslav Brozović and others. He also played for NK Lokomotiva, Dinamo Zagreb and Metalac.

== Managerial career ==
As manager, he coached Dinamo Zagreb in 1973, and several Croat clubs abroad, such as Toronto Metros-Croatia in Canada and Croatia Sydney in Australia. With Toronto, he won the Soccer Bowl '76.
