= Richard Dinnis =

English football manager (born 1942

Personal information
- Date of birth: 11 December 1942 (age 83)
- Place of birth: Clitheroe, Lancashire, England
- Position: Centre-half

Senior career*
Years	Team	Apps	(Gls)
1961	Bishop Auckland		
1963–1964	Great Harwood		

Managerial career
- 1970–1975: Blackburn Rovers Reserves
- 1973–1974: Blackburn Rovers (caretaker)
- 1977: Newcastle United
- 1978: Philadelphia Fury
- 1992–1993: Barrow
- * Club domestic league appearances and goals

Richard R. Dinnis (born 11 December 1942) is an English former football coach and player.

Dinnis played semi-professionally as a centre-half. Little is known of his playing career, but he signed with Bishop Auckland in 1961 after a successful trial. In the mid-1960s he was playing for Great Harwood in the Lancashire Combination. He later went into coaching, and joined Blackburn Rovers as their reserve team coach. He was caretaker manager of the club from 1973 to 1974, remaining as reserve team coach once Gordon Lee was appointed. In 1975, he joined Lee at Newcastle United, becoming the assistant manager. When Lee left the club in January 1977, Dinnis saw out the rest of the season as caretaker manager. He was appointed manager of Newcastle that summer, but was sacked after a poor start. Dinnis then spent a few years in the North American Soccer League (NASL), firstly as coach of the Philadelphia Fury, and later as assistant coach at the Vancouver Whitecaps. Following a brief return to Blackburn, he then had a multitude of coaching roles for various clubs over the next two decades, including a stint in Saudi Arabia. He also maintained a job as a physical education teacher during this time. Towards the end of the 1990s and throughout the 2000s, Dinnis worked as a football summariser and analyst for BBC Radio Lancashire, commentating on football games in North West England.

== Coaching career ==
Dinnis obtained his Football Association "A" Licence coaches badge and was then employed as reserve team coach at Blackburn Rovers from 1970 to 1975. Dinnis briefly acted as caretaker manager of the club, when Ken Furphy left to join Sheffield United. He took charge of six matches with the first team, winning three and losing three. This included a short FA Cup run, where the team defeated non-league club Altrincham in a second round replay, before going out in the third round to Everton. He continued to coach the reserves, after Gordon Lee was appointed manager of Blackburn.

=== Newcastle United ===
When Lee took over as manager at Newcastle United, he appointed Dinnis as first team coach. During the 1975–76 season, Dinnis was a peripheral figure. Dinnis himself always said that his main job was to support Lee. At the start of the 1976–77 season, Dinnis took over the coaching duties with Lee picking and motivating the team. In 1976, Newcastle reached the Football League Cup Final against Manchester City, where they lost 2–1. When Lee suddenly resigned as manager in early 1977 after only 18 months in charge, the Newcastle board first offered the job to the Bolton Wanderers manager, Ian Greaves but he turned the job down. The board made a surprising attempt to involve some players in the decision over who should be the next manager. It led to one of the most controversial months in the club history and to the appointment of Dinnis as caretaker manager until the end of the season.

Under Dinnis, the team's form was such that they found themselves with an outside chance of the League championship, but would lose four of the last five games. Nevertheless, Newcastle finished the season in fifth place in the First Division and qualified for the UEFA Cup with a win over Aston Villa in their final home game of the season on 16 May 1977. It was the club's highest league position for 25 years and the first time they had qualified for Europe for seven years. Nine days later and after much boardroom deliberation, Dinnis was offered a two-year contract as Newcastle manager.

Newcastle started the 1977–78 season with a 3–2 home win over Leeds United, however they then lost the next three matches. In September they lost at home to West Ham United and the directors issued Dinnis with an ultimatum before the next game at West Bromwich Albion which they again lost, leaving Newcastle bottom of the league. Newcastle then met Irish Premier League club, Bohemians in the UEFA Cup, a game they were expected to win, but they drew 0–0. They then won the home leg 4–0 to qualify for the next round, where they were defeated by a Johnny Rep inspired Bastia, who went on to the final. The next game Newcastle again lost 3–0, this time to Birmingham City, followed by a fourth consecutive defeat to Coventry City. Dinnis survived despite crisis board meetings. However, following criticism of the board by Dinnis in the media, he was sacked as manager on 9 November 1977.

=== Later years ===
He coached Philadelphia Fury of the North American Soccer League in 1978, but resigned mid-season and was replaced by player-coach Alan Ball. He was appointed assistant coach to the Vancouver Whitecaps head coach Tony Waiters, where they went on to win the Soccer Bowl. Dinnis returned to Blackburn three years later, assisting John Pickering. Afterwards, he joined Bristol City as chief scout, and from January and April 1982, he was assistant manager to Roy Hodgson. Following his departure from Bristol City, he gained a Diploma in Physical Education at Carnegie College, Leeds.

Dinnis returned to football, spending six months as a coach at Middlesbrough, before a short spell as a youth coach at Al-Ittihad who were then managed by Bob Houghton. He later spent time coaching at Accrington Stanley, Barrow and for the centres of excellence at Burnley and Bolton Wanderers. He also worked as a summariser and analyst for BBC Radio Lancashire up until the late 2000s, dealing with Blackburn, Blackpool, Burnley and Preston North End.

Parallel to his coaching jobs, Dinnis was a physical education teacher, firstly at Canon Slade School in Bolton, and then at Clitheroe Royal Grammar School.
