= Philadelphia Atoms =

Defunct American soccer club

- Full name: Philadelphia Atoms
- Nickname: Atoms
- Founded: 1973
- Dissolved: 1976; 50 years ago
- Stadium: Veterans Stadium (1973–75); Franklin Field (1976); Philadelphia
- Owner(s): Thomas McCloskey
- Head Coach: Al Miller
- League: NASL
Home colors	Away colors

The Philadelphia Atoms were an American soccer team, based in Philadelphia, that played in the North American Soccer League (NASL). They played from 1973 to 1976, at Veterans Stadium (1973–75) and Franklin Field (1976). The club's colors were blue and white. The club was succeeded by the Philadelphia Fury in 1978.

== History ==
The Atoms were founded by Philadelphia construction mogul Thomas McCloskey in 1973 at the urging of Kansas City Chiefs and Dallas Tornado owner Lamar Hunt. Playing a largely American line-up, they won the NASL title in their first year of existence by defeating Hunt’s Dallas club 2–0. After this championship match, Philadelphia goalkeeper and Ridley Park, Pennsylvania native Bob Rigby became the first soccer player to be featured on the cover of Sports Illustrated.

The Atoms could not sustain the success of their first season as the club missed the playoffs in each of their remaining three NASL campaigns. Attendance began to flag and, after the 1975 season, the team was sold to a group of Mexican clubs, which included Club Deportivo Guadalajara. Fielding a primarily Mexican side (almost 30 years before Chivas USA would try a similar approach in Major League Soccer), attendance continued to wane and the club folded after the 1976 season.

Although Clive Toye reports in his recent book that the franchise was sold to an ownership group from Montreal, he apparently confuses the fate of the next Philadelphia NASL team for that of the Atoms; the Atoms were, in fact, going to be relocated to San Antonio by their Mexican owners, who planned to replace the San Antonio Thunder franchise (which itself had just relocated to Honolulu to play as Team Hawaii). This plan never came to fruition, and the Philadelphia franchise was placed into receivership by the NASL.

The franchise was removed from receivership two years later when the Philadelphia Fury began their three-year run in Philadelphia in 1978.

The Atoms were also part of what is considered by soccer historians to be the birth of modern indoor soccer in the United States. On February 11, 1974, they hosted the Soviet Red Army team at the Spectrum in an exhibition match. That night, 11,790 roaring fans watched the reigning league champions hold their own into the final period before the Russians finally pulled away for a 6–3 victory. The following year the NASL staged its first league-wide indoor tournament, and within a few years both the NASL and the MISL were playing full indoor seasons.

In 2017 a new team began play in the American Soccer League called Philadelphia Atoms SC. The club claims the heritage and colors of the original Atoms.

== Year-by-year ==
Full Atoms logo

Year	Record	Regular season finish	Playoffs	Avg Attendance
1973	9–2–8	1st, Eastern Division	NASL Champions	11,501
1974 indoor	1–1	friendlies only	n/a	9,057
1974	8–11–1	3rd, Eastern Division	Did not qualify	11,784
1975 indoor	1–1	3rd, Region 1	Did not qualify	no home games
1975	10–12	4th, Eastern Division	Did not qualify	6,848
1976 indoor	1–0	friendly only	n/a	4,234
1976	8–16	4th, Eastern Division, Atlantic Conference	Did not qualify	5,912

== Honors ==
NASL championships
- 1973

NASL Division Titles

- 1973 Eastern Division

NASL Rookie of the Year

- 1975 Chris Bahr

NASL Coach of the Year

- 1973 Al Miller

NASL Leading Goaltender

- 1973 Bob Rigby (GAA: 0.62)

U.S. Soccer Hall of Fame

- 1990 Manfred Schellscheidt
- 1995 Al Miller
- 2007 Bobby Smith

All-Star first team selections

- 1973 Chris Dunleavy, Jim Fryatt, Andy Provan
- 1974 Chris Dunleavy
- 1975 Bobby Smith

All-Star second team selections

- 1973 Roy Evans, Bob Rigby, Bobby Smith, Derek Trevis
- 1974 Bob Rigby, Derek Trevis
- 1975 Bob Hope, Tony Want
- 1976 Bobby Smith

All-Star honorable mentions

- 1973 Barry Barto, George O'Neill
- 1974 Jim Fryatt, Bobby Smith

== Head coaches ==
- (United States) Al Miller (1973–1975)

== See also ==
- Philadelphia Fury
- Philadelphia Spartans
- Philadelphia Union
