= Paolo Cimpiel =

Italian footballer

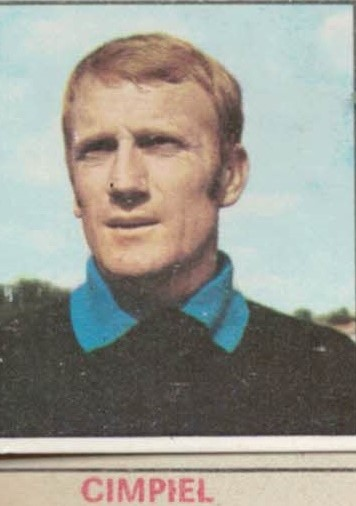

Personal information
- Date of birth: 12 June 1940 (age 86)
- Place of birth: Pasiano di Pordenone, Italy
- Height: 1.86 m (6 ft 1 in)
- Position: Goalkeeper

Youth career
- –1960: Bologna

Senior career*
Years	Team	Apps	(Gls)
1960–1961	Trapani	11	(0)
1961–1964	Bologna	12	(0)
1964–1965	Brescia	0	(0)
1965–1966	Verona	34	(0)
1966–1968	Catanzaro	66	(0)
1968–1970	Cesena	48	(0)
1970–1973	Taranto	84	(0)
1973–1975	Pescara	36+	(0)
1975–1976	Chieti	8	(0)
1976	Toronto Metros-Croatia	23	(0)
1977	Toronto Italia	14+	(0)
1978–1983	Osimana	88	(0)
Total		424+	(0)
- * Club domestic league appearances and goals

Paolo Cimpiel (born 12 June 1940) is an Italian retired footballer who played as a goalkeeper.

In 1977, he played in the National Soccer League with Toronto Italia.
