= Dragan Vujović =

Montenegrin football manager and player

Personal information
- Full name: Dragan Vujović
- Date of birth: 19 August 1953 (age 73)
- Place of birth: Cetinje, PR Montenegro, FPR Yugoslavia
- Height: 1.86 m (6 ft 1 in)
- Position: Forward

Youth career
- 1969–1971: Budućnost Titograd

Senior career*
| Years | Team | Apps | (Gls) |
| 1971–1982 | Budućnost Titograd | 206 | (41) |
| 1973 | → OFK Titograd (loan) | 34 | (8) |
| 1982–1983 | Montreal Manic | 50 | (19) |
| 1983–1984 | New York Cosmos (indoor) | 27 | (22) |
| 1984 | New York Cosmos | 16 | (3) |
| 1984–1985 | New York Cosmos (indoor) | 17 | (13) |
| 1986–1987 | Budućnost Titograd | 39 | (3) |
| Total | | 389 | (109) |

Managerial career
- 2003–2004: Serbia and Montenegro U17
- 2004: Serbia and Montenegro U21 (caretaker)
- * Club domestic league appearances and goals

Dragan "Guzo" Vujović (Serbian Cyrillic: Драган Гузо Вујовић; born 19 August 1953) is a Montenegrin former football manager and player.

== Playing career ==
Born in Cetinje to a Montenegrin father and an Italian mother, Vujović spent the majority of his playing career at Budućnost Titograd, making nearly 200 appearances in the Yugoslav First League over two spells. He also played overseas for the Montreal Manic and the New York Cosmos in the North American Soccer League and the Major Indoor Soccer League during the 1980s.

== Managerial career ==
From August to September 2004, Vujović served as caretaker manager of the Serbia and Montenegro U21s together with Tomislav Sivić. He also served as manager of his hometown club Lovćen.

== Career statistics ==
Appearances and goals by club, season and competition
| Club | Season | League | | |
| Club | Season | Division | Apps | Goals |
|---|---|---|---|---|
| Budućnost Titograd | 1971–72 | Yugoslav Second League | 6 | 2 |
| Budućnost Titograd | 1972–73 | Yugoslav Second League | 6 | 1 |
| Budućnost Titograd | 1973–74 | Yugoslav Second League | 15 | 2 |
| Budućnost Titograd | 1974–75 | Yugoslav Second League | 23 | 3 |
| Budućnost Titograd | 1975–76 | Yugoslav First League | 27 | 3 |
| Budućnost Titograd | 1976–77 | Yugoslav First League | 21 | 2 |
| Budućnost Titograd | 1977–78 | Yugoslav First League | 16 | 2 |
| Budućnost Titograd | 1978–79 | Yugoslav First League | 0 | 0 |
| Budućnost Titograd | 1979–80 | Yugoslav First League | 28 | 10 |
| Budućnost Titograd | 1980–81 | Yugoslav First League | 32 | 12 |
| Budućnost Titograd | 1981–82 | Yugoslav First League | 32 | 4 |
| Budućnost Titograd | Total | | 206 | 41 |
| OFK Titograd (loan) | 1972–73 | Yugoslav Second League | 17 | 5 |
| OFK Titograd (loan) | 1973–74 | Yugoslav Second League | 17 | 3 |
| OFK Titograd (loan) | Total | | 34 | 8 |
| Montreal Manic | 1982 | North American Soccer League | 24 | 8 |
| Montreal Manic | 1983 | North American Soccer League | 26 | 11 |
| Montreal Manic | Total | | 50 | 19 |
| New York Cosmos (indoor) | 1983–84 | North American Soccer League | 27 | 22 |
| New York Cosmos | 1984 | North American Soccer League | 16 | 3 |
| New York Cosmos (indoor) | 1984–85 | Major Indoor Soccer League | 17 | 13 |
| Budućnost Titograd | 1985–86 | Yugoslav First League | 9 | 0 |
| Budućnost Titograd | 1986–87 | Yugoslav First League | 30 | 3 |
| Budućnost Titograd | Total | | 39 | 3 |
| Career total | | | 389 | 109 |

== Honours ==
Budućnost Titograd

- Yugoslav Second League: 1971–72 (Group South), 1974–75 (Group East)
