= Montreal Manic =

Montreal Manic / Manic de Montréal
- Full name: Montreal Manic / Manic de Montréal
- Nickname: The Manic / Le Manic
- Founded: 1981
- Dissolved: 1983
- Stadium: Olympic Stadium; Montreal Forum (indoor)
- Capacity: 66,308
- Owner: Molson Brewery
- Chairman: Roger Samson
- Coach: Eddie Firmani; Andy Lynch
- League: North American Soccer League
Home colours	Away colours

The Montreal Manic or the Manic de Montréal were a professional soccer team based in Montreal, Quebec, Canada, that played in the North American Soccer League.

== History ==
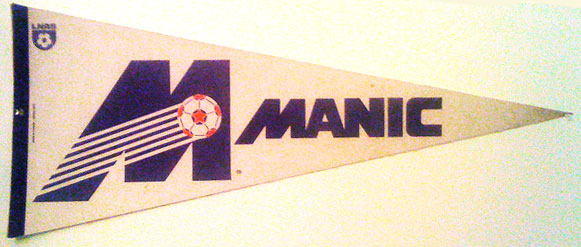
Vintage Montreal Manic pennant.

"Le Manic" as they were called by the locals, were Montreal's first professional soccer team since the NASL's Montreal Olympique folded in 1973. The team was named after a river in northeast Quebec, the Manicouagan, the site of a massive hydroelectric project.

The Montreal Manic competed from 1981 to 1983, with their home field being the Montreal Olympic Stadium. Previous to Montreal, the team played as the Philadelphia Fury from 1978 through 1980 and ten Fury players as well as manager Eddie Firmani moved to Montreal for 1981.

After defeating the Los Angeles Aztecs in the first round of the 1981 NASL playoffs, the Manic faced the Chicago Sting. An Olympic Stadium crowd of 58,542 (the largest-ever to see an NASL playoff game outside the Cosmos' Giants Stadium) saw the Manic defeat the Sting in the opening match before the series shifted to Chicago where the Manic lost twice and were eliminated. In 1982 the Manic performed better in the regular season than in 1981, but lost in the first round of the playoffs to the Fort Lauderdale Strikers and Firmani was fired.

In 1983 the interest in the team and the average attendance fell sharply. The Manic's opening home match in 1983 versus the Tampa Bay Rowdies was witnessed by just 6,460 fans. However, in their final season, the Manic produced one of the great shocks in NASL history by eliminating the New York Cosmos in the quarterfinals of the 1983 playoffs, winning the first match away 4–2 and winning the second match at home in a shootout. The Manic then lost to the Tulsa Roughnecks in the next round.

In the 1983 season, the Manic hosted Nottingham Forest (a 4–3 extra time loss) and FC Nantes (a 2–1 shootout victory for Montreal) at the Olympic Stadium.

In his book, Soccer in a Football World, North American soccer historian Dave Wangerin partially attributes the downfall of the Manic organization to the Molson ownership's declaration to attempt to build a Team Canada roster for the 1984 season. The new direction of the team meant many of the team's players who originated from foreign countries would be let go, to emphasize an all Canadian roster instead. Given that Canada had a relatively poor track record at producing world class soccer talent, Montreal fans were likely put off by the prospect that the quality of the team's play would instantly diminish for the 1984 season. More importantly, the team was allegedly in financial trouble despite the fact that the Manic had some of the highest attendances in the NASL. Reports indicated that during the first two seasons, the Manic lacked profitability as they had lost $7 million. Manic president Roger Samson blamed the losses on bad stadium deals, high rents, having the concession profits going directly to the Montreal Expos, a lack of a television deal, and that an average attendance of over 20,000 was insufficient to keep the franchise solvent.

== Year-by-year ==
Year	League	W	L	Pts	Reg. season	Playoffs	Avg Attend
1981	NASL	15	17	141	2nd, Eastern Division	Won 1st round (Los Angeles); Lost quarterfinal (Chicago)	23,704
1981–82	NASL Indoor	9	9	—	1st, American Conference, East Division	Lost 1st round (Tampa Bay)	
1982	NASL	19	13	159	2nd, Eastern Division	Lost 1st round (Ft. Lauderdale)	21,348
1983	NASL Indoor Grand Prix	5	3	53	1st, Grand Prix preliminaries	Runners-up (Tampa Bay)	6,972
1983	NASL	12	18	124	4th, Eastern Division	Won 1st round (New York); Lost semi-final (Tulsa)	9,910

== Honours ==
NASL championships
- none

NASL Indoor championships

- 1983 (runner-up)

Division titles

- 1981–82 Eastern Division, Atlantic Conference (indoor)

Indoor Leading Goal Scorer

- 1983 Dale Mitchell 12 goals

Indoor Leading Goalkeeper

- 1983 Mehdi Cerbah (GAA: 4.36, GA: 24)

Indoor Tournament Defensive MVP

- 1983 Mehdi Cerbah

All-Star first team selections

- 1981 Gordon Hill

All-Star second team selections

- 1983 Frantz Mathieu

Indoor All-Stars

- 1981–82 Gordon Hill (Atlantic Conference)

Canadian Soccer Hall of Fame

- 2001 Gerry Gray
- 2002 Dale Mitchell
- 2008 John McGrane
- 2014 Carmine Marcantonio

U.S. Soccer Hall of Fame

- 2003 Alan Willey
- 2007 Bobby Smith

Indoor Soccer Hall of Fame

- 2012 Victor Nogueira
- 2013 Brian Quinn
- 2014 Dale Mitchell

== Notable players ==
- (Iran) Mostafa Ebadi (1981–1983)
- (Canada) Nick Albanis (1981)
- (Algeria) Mehdi Cerbah (1983)
- (Canada) Chris Chueden (1981–1982)
- (England) Elvis Comrie (1982–1983)
- (France) Michel Corre (1981)
- (Canada) Brian Decaire (1982–1983)
- (Italy) Mimmo Dell'Armi (1982)
- (Canada) Pasquale Di Blasio (1983)
- (Canada) Charlie Falzon (1981–1982)
- (United States) Pat Fidelia (1981)
- (United States) Ed Gettemeier (1983)
- (Canada) Gerry Gray (1983)
- (Scotland) Mike Hewitt (1983)
- (England) Gordon Hill (1981–1982)
- (Canada) Greg Ion (1983)
- (Canada) Greg Kern (1981–1982)
- (United States) Hayden Knight (1981–1982)
- (France) Jean-François Larios (1983)
- (Canada) (Netherlands) Dwight Lodeweges (1983)
- (Scotland) Andy Lynch (1981–1982)
- (Canada) Carmine Marcantonio (1981–1983)
- (Haiti) Frantz Mathieu (1983)
- (Canada) John McGrane (1981–1983)
- (Canada) Dale Mitchell (1983)
- (United States) Victor Nogueira (1982)
- (Republic of Ireland) Fran O'Brien (1981–1982)
- (South Africa) Andrew Parkinson (1981–1982)
- (Northern Ireland) Brian Quinn (1982–83)
- (United States) Bob Rigby (1981–1982)
- (United States) Bobby Smith (1981)
- (Socialist Federal Republic of Yugoslavia) Damir Šutevski (1981–1982)
- (England) Tony Towers (1981–1983)
- (Nigeria) Thompson Usiyan (1981–1982)
- (Canada) John Van Oostveen (1981–1983)
- (Netherlands) Bobby Vosmaer (1981–1982)
- (Socialist Federal Republic of Yugoslavia) Dragan Vujović (1982–1983)
- (England) Alan Willey (1981–83)

== Head coaches ==
- (South Africa) (Italy) Eddie Firmani 1981–1982
- (Romania) (Canada) Pierre Mindru interim (1982)
- (Scotland) Andy Lynch (1983)

== See also ==
- Montreal Olympique
- Montreal Supra
- FC Supra du Québec
- Montreal Impact (1992–2011)
- CF Montreal
- Philadelphia Fury (1978–80)
