= Andy Racz =

American soccer player (1932–2013)

Personal information
- Full name: Andras Racz
- Date of birth: April 12, 1932
- Place of birth: Hungary
- Date of death: December 21, 2013 (aged 81)
- Height: 5 ft 10 in (1.78 m)

Senior career*
Years	Team	Apps	(Gls)
1957–1964	Philadelphia Ukrainian Nationals		
1963	→ New York (loan)		

International career
1964	United States	1	(0)
- * Club domestic league appearances and goals

Andras Racz (April 12, 1932 – December 21, 2013) was a soccer player who played in the American Soccer League and International Soccer League. Born in Hungary, he represented the United States internationally.

== Professional ==
Racz' entire professional career, which ran from 1957 to 1964, with the Philadelphia Ukrainians of the American Soccer League. He was the 1960 league MVP. The Ukrainian Nationals also won the 1960, 1961 and 1963 National Challenge Cup. In the summer of 1963, Racz played a single season for New York in the International Soccer League, an exhibition league composed of guest teams from Europe and a team of U.S. All Stars. On the completion of the ISL season, Racz returned to Philadelphia where he played with the Ukrainians through the 1963-1964 ASL season.

== National team ==
Racz earned one cap with the U.S. national team in a 10–0 loss to England on May 27, 1964.

He was inducted into the Southeastern Pennsylvania Soccer Hall of Fame in 1990.

== Death ==
Racz died on December 21, 2013, at the age of 81.
