= Andrew Parkinson (soccer) =

American soccer player (born 1959)

Personal information
- Full name: Andrew Parkinson
- Date of birth: May 5, 1959 (age 67)
- Place of birth: Johannesburg, South Africa
- Height: 6 ft 2 in (1.88 m)
- Positions: Forward; midfielder

Senior career*
Years	Team	Apps	(Gls)
1977	Highlands Park	6	(2)
1978–1979	Newcastle United	3	(0)
1979–1980	Peterborough United	13	(7)
1980	Philadelphia Fury	20	(3)
1981–1982	Montreal Manic	49	(19)
1981–1982	Montreal Manic (indoor)	16	(10)
1983	Fort Lauderdale Strikers (indoor)	2	(2)
1983	Team America	28	(12)
1983–1985	New York Cosmos (indoor)	35	(23)
1984	New York Cosmos	18	(7)
1985	Chicago Sting (indoor)	12	(3)
1985–1986	Tacoma Stars (indoor)	19	(5)

International career
1984	United States	2	(0)
- * Club domestic league appearances and goals

Andrew Parkinson (born May 5, 1959) is an American retired soccer forward/midfielder born in Johannesburg, South Africa who grew up playing soccer in Johannesburg, South Africa and then Newcastle, England before immigrating to the U.S. where he played five seasons in the North American Soccer League, two in Major Indoor Soccer League and one in the American Soccer League. Parkinson earned two caps with the U.S. national team in 1984.

== Early career ==
Parkinson, a native of Johannesburg, South Africa played professional soccer for Highlands Park in his native South Africa winning the league title and earning a league medal with Highlands Park in 1977 at 18 years of age. In February 1978, Parkinson flew to Newcastle, England where he tried out with English First Division club Newcastle United who signed Parkinson to a two year contract. Parkinson was granted a work permit since he was a South African citizen and signed for Newcastle United on 27 February 1978 at 18 years of age and debuted three days later for Newcastle United against Manchester United in the English first division at St.James's Park. As fate would have it, the following week Parkinson, in just his second game for Newcastle United, suffered a broken ankle from a late tackle by a Leeds United defender which sidelined Parkinson for the rest of the 1978 season. Parkinson played two seasons 1978/1979 in England for Newcastle United under manager Bill McGarry. Due to a lack of playing time at Newcastle United Parkinson opted to be a free agent at the end of the 1979 season and accepted an offer from Peterborough United. Parkinson then signed in June 1979 for lower-division club Peterborough United where he played 13 games, scoring 7 goals halfway through the 1979–1980 season. In December 1979 Parkinson left Peterborough United and in February 1980 Andrew Parkinson was sold to the Philadelphia Fury of the North American Soccer League during the 1979/80 season.

== Move to U.S. ==
In 1980, Parkinson then moved to the United States where he signed with the Philadelphia Fury of the North American Soccer League (NASL). Once again, he played a single season before the Fury was relocated to Montreal becoming the Montreal Manic. Parkinson had a successful two seasons with the Montreal Manic scoring the first two goals for the new franchise in the first game of the season winning 2 - 1 against the Toronto Blizzard and leading them to the playoffs and was one of the leading goal scorers once again. During this time, Parkinson received his U.S. citizenship. In 1983, the U.S. Soccer Federation, in coordination with the NASL, entered the U.S. national team, known as Team America, into the NASL as a league franchise. The team drew on U.S. citizens playing in the NASL, Major Indoor Soccer League and American Soccer League. Parkinson turned down a new contract offer from the Montreal Manic for the 1983 season becoming a free agent and signing for the Ft Lauderdale Strikers instead, playing in the opening seasons first two indoor matches for Fort Lauderdale in the 1983 indoor NASL before being recruited and signing with Team America. When Team America finished the 1983 season in the struggling NASL the team disbanded with Parkinson being the leading goal scorer with 12 goals. The New York Cosmos acquired Parkinson from Team America when Team America disbanded and he played for the New York Cosmos during the 1983–84 NASL indoor season and the 1984 outdoor season. At the end of the 1984 outdoor season, the NASL collapsed and the Cosmos jumped to the Major Indoor Soccer League. Parkinson began the indoor MISL season with the N.Y.Cosmos who also folded and then moved on to play for the Chicago Sting in March 1985. In the fall of 1985, Parkinson signed with the Tacoma Stars indoor of the MISL during the 1985–1986 season. After playing in 137 outdoor games and scoring a total of 50 goals finishing his professional soccer career in the North American Soccer League Andrew Parkinson retired from the beautiful game in 1986 at the young age of 27 years old and then went on to having a very successful 37 year business career as a General Manager with Porsche in the Automobile business.

== National team ==
In 1984, Parkinson earned his two caps with the U.S. national team playing against the then World Cup champions Italy and Trinidad and Tobago.

== Early life ==
Parkinson has High School Springbok colors in soccer and basketball. Attended Sir John Adamson High School.

== Retirement ==
Andrew Parkinson retired from the Automobile business on 31 August 2022 as a General Manager for Porsche of Orlando and lives in Florida with his wife and family including nine grandchildren.
