= Carmine Marcantonio =

Canadian retired soccer player (born 1954)

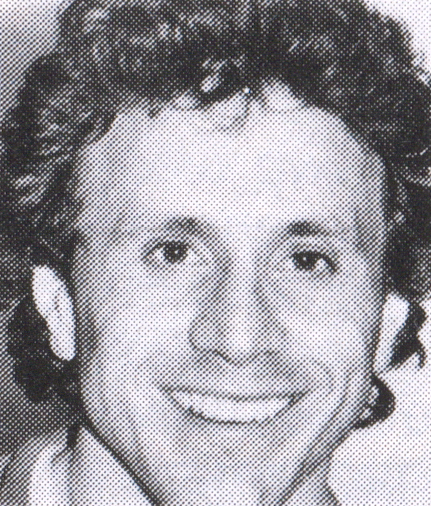
- Marcantonio circa 1984

Personal information
- Date of birth: 21 November 1954 (age 71)
- Place of birth: Castel di Sangro, Italy
- Position: Midfielder

Senior career*
Years	Team	Apps	(Gls)
1973–1975	Toronto Italia		
1976	Toronto Metros-Croatia	23	(0)
1977	Toronto Italia		
1978–1980	Washington Diplomats	65	(4)
1980–1981	New York Arrows	77	(4)
1981–1983	Montreal Manic	36	(2)
1984	New York Cosmos	8	(0)
1983–1985	New York Cosmos (indoor)	29	(7)
1985	Toronto Dinamo		

International career
1976–1980	Canada	2	(0)

Managerial career
- 1987: North York Rockets
- * Club domestic league appearances and goals

Carmine Marcantonio (born 21 November 1954 in Castel di Sangro, Italy) is a Canadian retired soccer player who earned two caps for the national team between 1976 and 1980.

== Club career ==
Marcantonio played in the National Soccer League (NSL) in 1973 with Toronto Italia for three seasons. In 1976, he played in the North American Soccer League (NASL) with Toronto Metros-Croatia, where he won the Soccer Bowl. The following season he returned to play with Toronto Italia. in 1978, he returned to the NASL to play with the Washington Diplomats. The remainder of his tenure in the NASL he played with Montreal Manic and New York Cosmos. In the summer of 1985, he returned to the NSL to play with Toronto Dinamo.

He played one season of indoor soccer for the New York Arrows of the Major Indoor Soccer League and several indoor seasons for NASL clubs.

He was a member of Canadian Soccer Hall of Fame class of 2014.

== International career ==
He made his debut for Canada on September 24, 1976 against the United States in a 1–1 draw in a World Cup qualifier in Vancouver. His second and final cap came in a 2–1 win against the Americans in a World Cup qualifier four years later in Vancouver.

== Managerial career ==
Marcantonio served as the head coach for the North York Rockets in the Canadian Soccer League.
