= Barry Barto =

American soccer player and coach (born 1950)

Personal information
- Date of birth: January 7, 1950 (age 76)
- Place of birth: Philadelphia, Pennsylvania, U.S.
- Height: 5 ft 8 in (1.73 m)
- Position: Midfielder

Youth career
- 1969–1972: Philadelphia Textile

Senior career*
| Years | Team | Apps | (Gls) |
| 1972 | Montreal Olympique | 9 | (1) |
| 1973–1976 | Philadelphia Atoms | 58 | (1) |
| 1977 | Fort Lauderdale Strikers | 1 | (0) |
| Total | | 68 | (2) |

International career
| 1972–1975 | United States | 16 | (0) |

Managerial career
- 1976–1981: Philadelphia Textile
- 1982–2005: UNLV
- * Club domestic league appearances and goals

Barry Barto (born January 7, 1950) is an American retired soccer midfielder and college coach. He played in the North American Soccer League and coached for thirty years at Philadelphia Textile and UNLV.

== Player ==
=== College and NASL ===
Barto grew up in Philadelphia where he began playing soccer when eleven years old. He attended Philadelphia Textile where he played on the school's soccer team from 1969 to 1972. He was a two-time second team All-American. He graduated with a degree in marketing. That year the North American Soccer League (NASL) held its first college draft and the Montreal Olympique selected Barto in the third round. Despite his low standing in the draft, Barto finished second to Mike Winter for Rookie of the Year.

At the end of the season, the Philadelphia Atoms, an NASL expansion franchise, traded for Barto as part of its efforts to create a team dominated by American, and preferably local, players. In 1973, the Atoms took the NASL championship and Barto was selected as an All Star Honorable Mention (third team). Barto remained with the Atoms through the 1976 season, the Atoms last. He then moved to the Fort Lauderdale Strikers where he played in only one game as a defender in 1977. At the end of the season, he retired from playing. By that time, he had already begun his second career, coaching.

=== National team ===
Barto earned sixteen caps with the U.S. national team between 1972 and 1975. He was the captain for most of his games in 1974 and 1975. His first game with the national team came in a 3–2 loss to Canada on August 20, 1972. He became a regular through 1973 and played both U.S. games in 1974. His last cap came in the first U.S. game of 1975, a 7–0 loss to Poland on March 26, 1975.

== Coaching ==
By the time he retired from playing, Barto had spent time as a business manager and the Associate Dean for Students at Philadelphia Textile. In 1976, the school hired him as the head coach of its soccer team. In his six years as head coach of the Rams, he took the team to an 85–15–6 record. Textile went to the NCAA tournament, including the Final Four in 1978 and 1981, while under Barto. In 1982, UNLV hired Barto as its first men's soccer coach. Barto remained in this position for 24 years. On November 29, 2005, the university removed Barto as head coach and reassigned in the athletic department. He left the team with a 221–200–38 record and five NCAA tournament appearances.
