= Roy Evans =

English footballer and manager (born 1948)

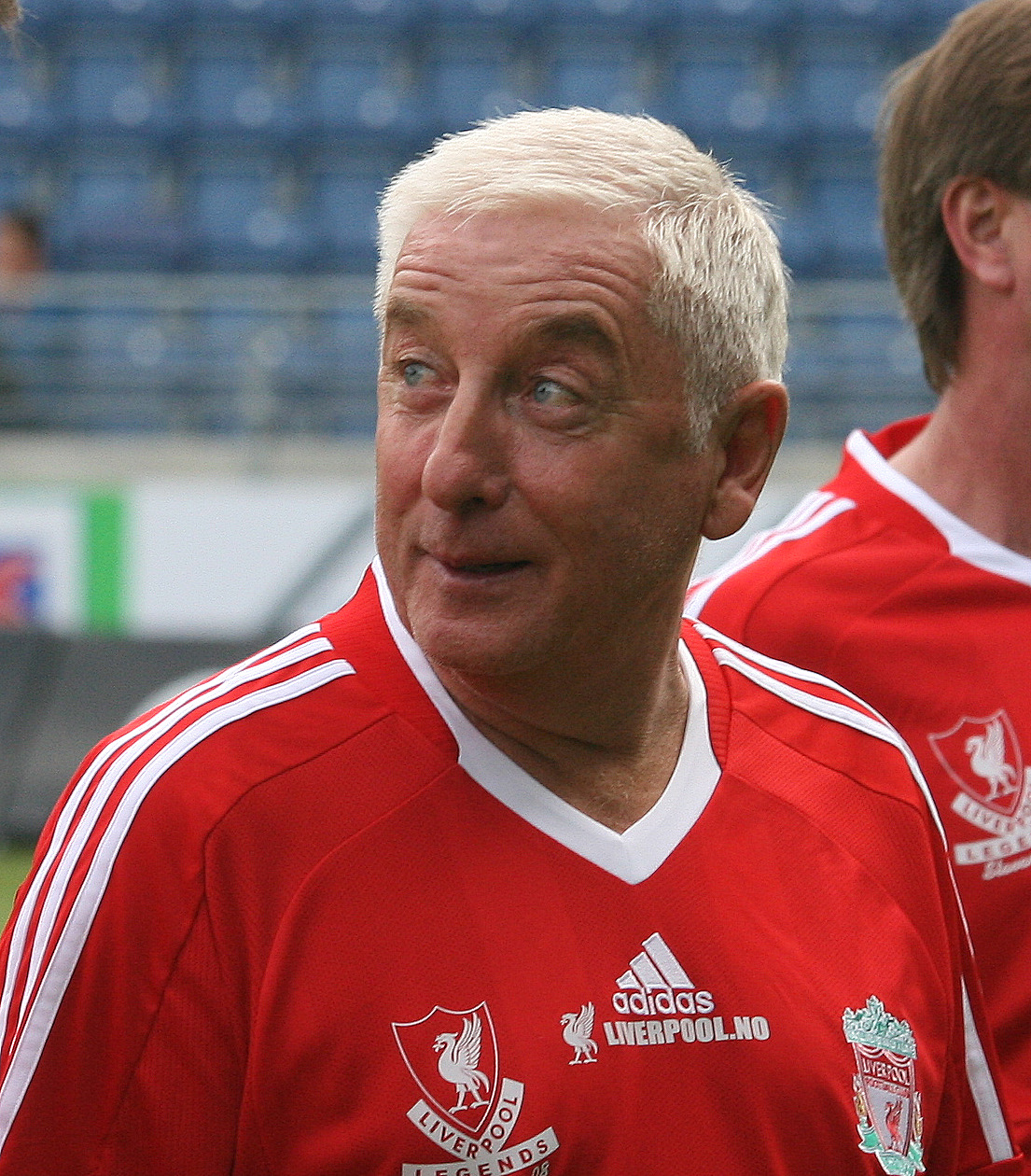

Personal information
- Full name: Roy Quentin Echlin Evans
- Date of birth: 4 October 1948 (age 78)
- Place of birth: Bootle, England
- Position: Centre-back

Youth career
- Liverpool

Senior career*
| Years | Team | Apps | (Gls) |
| 1965–1974 | Liverpool | 9 | (0) |
| 1973 | → Philadelphia Atoms (loan) | 19 | (2) |

Managerial career
- 1994–1998: Liverpool
- 1998: Liverpool (with Gérard Houllier)
- 2000: Fulham (with Karl-Heinz Riedle)
- 2001: Swindon Town
- * Club domestic league appearances and goals

Roy Quentin Echlin Evans (born 4 October 1948) is an English former footballer who played as a defender for Liverpool, where he also had a spell as manager. Aside from his time at Liverpool, he had a short spell in the United States; and also managed Fulham and Swindon Town.

== Career ==
An England schoolboy international, Evans was a defender who was a long way down the pecking order at Liverpool in the 1960s and 1970s—he also spent the summer of 1973 in the North American Soccer League with the Philadelphia Atoms. In 1974 he gave up his playing career to become Liverpool's reserve team coach and was subsequently part of the Liverpool coaching team under a succession of managers.

=== Liverpool manager ===
On 28 January 1994, Graeme Souness quit as Liverpool manager in the wake of a shock FA Cup exit at the hands of Bristol City. Evans took over as manager of a Liverpool side who were mid-table in the Premier League and out of contention for any major honours, although they were 8th by the end of the season. Evans had inherited a side from Souness that had lost confidence in the three years following Kenny Dalglish's departure, as well as a side that was mismatched largely due to the signings that Souness made.

For the 1994–95 season, Evans strengthened his side with the addition of defenders John Scales and Phil Babb as well as young winger Mark Kennedy. He also gave further first-team opportunities to youngsters Steve McManaman, Jamie Redknapp and Robbie Fowler, who at the time were among the hottest prospects in English football. Established players such as John Barnes, Mark Wright and Ian Rush blended well with these young stars as Liverpool finished fourth in the Premier League with 74 points and triumphed in the Football League Cup, beating Bolton Wanderers 2–1 with two McManaman goals, and winning the competition for a record fifth time.

Over the summer of 1995, Evans made the headlines by paying a British record fee for Nottingham Forest striker Stan Collymore. Many observers tipped Liverpool to win the Premier League title for that season, particularly as defending champions Blackburn had promoted Kenny Dalglish to Director of Football and appointed the less successful Ray Harford as manager, and runners-up Manchester United had sold three key players and surprisingly relied on young players to fill their place. Although Liverpool looked like contenders during the first stages of the season, the title race had effectively become a Newcastle United-Manchester United contest by Christmas, with Manchester United finally clinching the title. Liverpool, meanwhile, had to settle for third place in the league; any lingering hopes of title glory were finished off towards the end of April with a shock defeat by Coventry City. They did reach the FA Cup final, but lost 1–0 to a late Eric Cantona goal for Manchester United. As United had done the double, Evans and his exciting young team would be competing in the 1996–97 European Cup Winners' Cup. Nonetheless, their League position had improved from fourth to third on the previous attempt. This had happened despite collecting only 71 points; however, the league notably had been reduced by four games that season.

The 1996–97 season in English football proved to be the closest Evans would come to winning the Premier League title. Evans strengthened his side that was built around McManaman and Fowler, with the acquisition of Czech midfielder Patrik Berger over the summer of 1996, but by the end of the 1996–97 season all the talk around Anfield was about a promising 17-year-old striker, Michael Owen, who had shown tremendous potential in a handful of games for the club. Liverpool had led the Premier League on several occasions before the end of January, even having a five-point lead at the top of the table in January, but eventually finished poorly in fourth place, while Manchester United clinched the title by a seven-point margin. Their European Cup Winners' Cup adventure ended in the semi-finals when they lost to Paris St Germain. They had also collected three points fewer overall, finishing with 68, with much of the press berating the club for a lack of discipline off the field, dubbing Evans' squad the Spice Boys for their lifestyles off the pitch, which affected their performances on it. In the last game of that season, against Sheffield Wednesday, Liverpool failed to win, with Owen hitting the post late on. Had he scored Liverpool would have finished second and had the opportunity to play in the following season's European Cup.

With Stan Collymore moving to Aston Villa in the close season, Evans did not want to throw Owen into the first team, so he brought in midfield hardman Paul Ince, and legendary German striker Karlheinz Riedle to partner the prolific Fowler. Liverpool appeared ready to mount a strong title challenge in 1997–98 season, but an injury to Fowler, which lasted for the majority of the season, prevented the team from making the most of its potential. Owen burst onto the scene with 18 goals in 36 Premier League games. Nevertheless, they again collected three points fewer than the previous season for the third straight season and had to settle for third place in the league and another UEFA Cup campaign.

In 1998 Liverpool's longstanding Boot Room coach Ronnie Moran retired and was set to be replaced by Gérard Houllier for the 1998–99 season onwards. It was decided that Houllier would become joint manager of Liverpool to work alongside Evans, but the arrangement was not a success and Evans resigned in November to leave Houllier in sole charge. Houllier remained at the club until 2004, collecting one FA Cup, one UEFA Cup and two League Cups.

=== Liverpool legacy ===
When Roy Evans took over from Graeme Souness in 1994 the team was in rapid free-fall. In his first full season (1994–95) Liverpool finished 4th with 74 points. At this point it seemed that he had reversed the decline that had set in under the Souness regime, and the 'glory days' would soon be returning. However, the team was to finish the next three seasons with three points fewer than the previous season (1995–96, 1996–97, 1997–98), suggesting that after an initial 'honeymoon' things quickly stagnated. The period of joint management with Gerard Houllier was a radical effort by the board to reverse that stagnation. By 1998 Evans had assembled a talented nucleus of players, who were particularly impressive going forward and in their attacking football, where Evans had been credited with creating arguably the nation's most exciting and aesthetically pleasing team of the 1990s.

=== After Liverpool ===
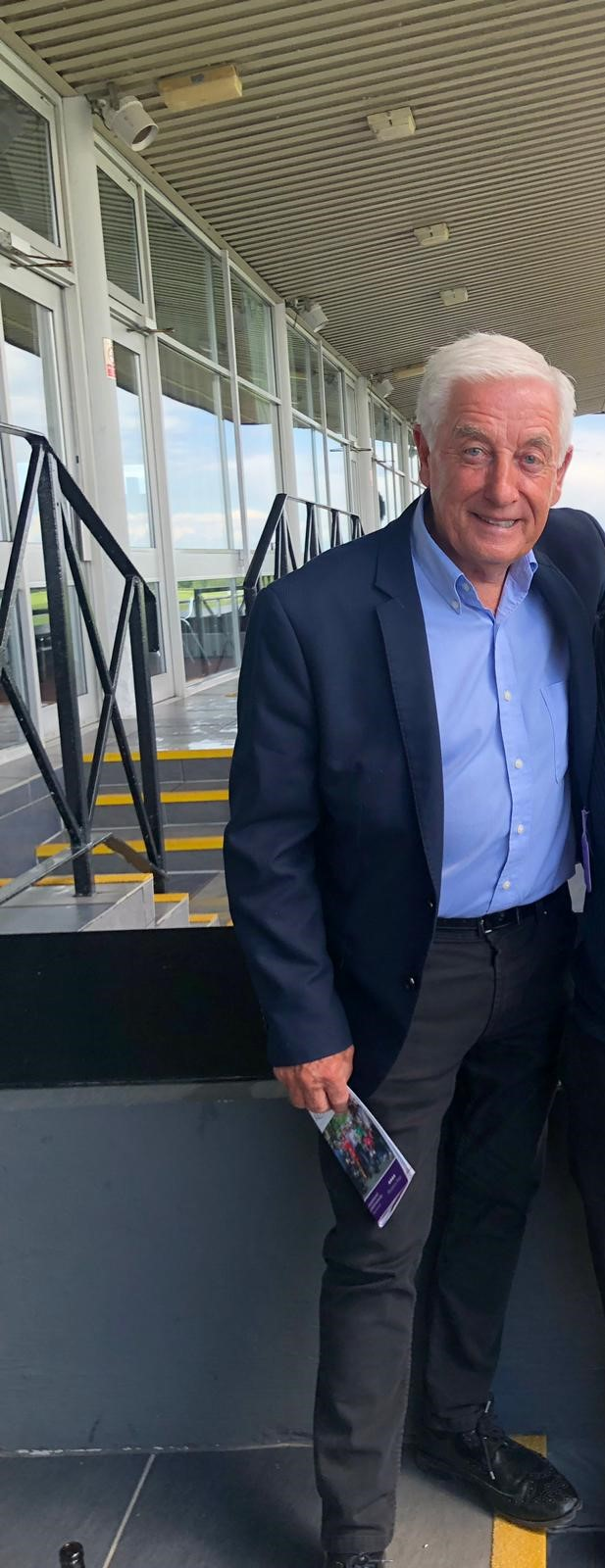
Roy Evans pictured with a fan in 2019.

Evans was out of work for over a year. His name was linked with Nottingham Forest following their relegation from the Premier League at the end of the 1998–99 season, but the job went to David Platt instead. He also lost out in the race to become Bolton Wanderers manager in 1999, with the club appointing former player Sam Allardyce. His comeback finally came in March 2000 when he became joint caretaker manager of Fulham alongside Karlheinz Riedle until Jean Tigana was given the job a month later.

In June 2001, Evans was named Director of Football at Swindon Town in Division Two, with 33-year-old former Liverpool defender Neil Ruddock as player-coach. But the pair failed to inspire a promotion challenge at the County Ground, and on 20 December 2001 they were succeeded by new manager Andy King.

In November 2004, when former Liverpool striker John Toshack was appointed as the new manager of Wales, Evans accepted an offer to be his assistant.

In February 2007, he accepted an offer to become part-time assistant manager to Brian Carey at League Two strugglers Wrexham, and helped Wrexham avoid relegation to the Conference National. After Wrexham escaped relegation from League Two at the end of the 2006–07 season, this agreement was extended.

As well as his coaching commitments, he also currently acts as a co-commentator for live audio broadcasts of Liverpool matches on the official web site, www.liverpoolfc.tv. Evans also co-operated on his authorised biography, called Ghost on the Wall, which was released at the end of 2004.

== Honours ==
=== Manager ===
Liverpool

- Football League Cup: 1994–95

Individual

- Premier League Manager of the Month: December 1995, January 1996

== Managerial statistics ==
Managerial record by team and tenure
| Team | From | To | Record | | | | |
| Team | From | To | P | W | D | L | Win % |
|---|---|---|---|---|---|---|---|
| Liverpool | 28 January 1994 | 12 November 1998 | 244 | 123 | 63 | 58 | 50.4 |
| Swindon Town | 3 August 2001 | 20 December 2001 | 26 | 10 | 6 | 10 | 38.5 |
| Total | | | 270 | 133 | 69 | 68 | 49.3 |
