= Bobby Smith (American soccer) =

American soccer player

Personal information
- Full name: Robert Smith
- Date of birth: March 29, 1951 (age 75)
- Place of birth: Trenton, New Jersey, U.S.
- Position: Defender

Youth career
- 1969–1972: Rider University

Senior career*
Years	Team	Apps	(Gls)
1973–1975	Philadelphia Atoms	62	(3)
1974–1975	→ Dundalk (loan)	20	(0)
1976–1978	New York Cosmos	47	(1)
1979	San Diego Sockers	10	(0)
1980	Philadelphia Fury	22	(0)
1980–1981	→ Philadelphia Fever (loan)	24	(1)
1981	Montreal Manic	24	(0)

International career
1973–1980	United States	18	(0)
- * Club domestic league appearances and goals

Robert "Bobby" Smith (born March 29, 1951) is a retired U.S. soccer defender who spent nine years in the North American Soccer League and one in the League of Ireland and the Major Indoor Soccer League. He also earned eighteen caps with the United States men's national soccer team and is a member of the National Soccer Hall of Fame.

== Youth ==
Smith grew up in Trenton, New Jersey and attended Steinert High School in Hamilton Township, New Jersey. After high school, he attended Rider University in Lawrenceville, New Jersey from 1969 through 1972. While at Rider, he played four seasons on the men's soccer team. He holds the college record for most goals in a season (18) and career (46). In 1997, Rider University inducted Smith into its Hall of Fame.

== Professional ==
The Philadelphia Atoms, a North American Soccer League (NASL) expansion franchise, drafted Smith in the second round of the 1973 College Draft. That year, Smith took home second team All Star honors as the Atoms ran to the NASL championship title. They set a record that season for allowing only 14 goals. Smith returned each of the next two seasons, but the Atoms were unable to replicate their first-year success. Smith, on the other hand, continued to be recognized as one of the league's top defenders. In 1974, he was an All Star honorable mention (third team) and in 1975, he became the first native-born U.S. player in the NASL to earn first team All Star recognition. Part of the reason for his success in 1975 came from a loan spell with League of Ireland First Division club, Dundalk during the 1974-1975 NASL off-season.

In 1976, the Atoms sold Smith, and teammate Bob Rigby, to the New York Cosmos for $100,000. The move came as part of the condition put on the Cosmos when they signed Pelé. Pelé insisted the Cosmos surround him with good supporting teammates and the Cosmos went shopping. Smith spent three seasons with the Cosmos, winning two more NASL championships with them and earning second team All Star honors in 1976. However, by his third season with the team, the influx of big-name international players saw Smith's playing time drop to an all-time low of nine games. At the end of the 1978 season, the Cosmos sent Smith to the San Diego Sockers. In 1979, he was named an honorable mention All Star, his fifth time on an All Star list. However, at the end of the season, the Sockers sent him to the Philadelphia Fury for the 1980 season. The Atoms had folded while Smith was with the Cosmos and the Fury was a new expansion franchise in Philadelphia.

Smith spent only one season with the Fury, but his time with the team led to his also playing for the Philadelphia Fever of Major Indoor Soccer League (MISL) during the 1980-1981 indoor season. The Fever had already played a season, but coach George O'Neill—hoping to draw on seasoned pros the way defending champions New York Arrows had—remade the team with NASL veterans and drew on several Fury players, including Smith and teammate Bob Rigby. Despite the presence of Smith and other Fury players, the Fever performed poorly and soon vanished from the American soccer scene. Smith then moved to the Montreal Manic of one last season in the NASL. He retired at the end of the 1981 season.

== National team ==
Smith earned 18 caps with the U.S. national team. His first appearance came in an August 12, 1973 victory over Poland. Smith became a regular on the team, seeing time in the rest of the U.S. games that year, as well as all of its games in 1974 and half the 1975 games. In 1976, he saw time in several games, the last being a 3–0 loss to Canada in a playoff in Port-au-Prince, Haiti, which eliminated the U.S. from qualification for the 1978 FIFA World Cup. Smith would not play for the national team until 1980 when he played in his last game, a 1–1 tie with Portugal on October 7.

== Post-playing career ==
After retiring from playing professionally, Smith returned to New Jersey where he has coached youth soccer. He is the former owner of Smitty Kicks. He currently runs the Bob Smith Soccer Academy in Robbinsville Township, New Jersey. He resides in Hamilton Square, New Jersey. Smith was selected as the Grand Marshal for the 2008 Trenton St. Patrick's Day Parade.

In 2007, he was inducted into the National Soccer Hall of Fame.
