= Frank Spraggon =

English footballer

Personal information
- Date of birth: 27 October 1945 (age 81)
- Place of birth: Marley Hill, England
- Height: 5 ft 9 in (1.75 m)
- Position: Defender

Senior career*
Years	Team	Apps	(Gls)
1963–1976	Middlesbrough	280	(3)
1976	Minnesota Kicks	24	(0)
1976–1977	Hartlepool United	1	(0)
Total		305	(3)
- * Club domestic league appearances and goals

Frank Spraggon (born 27 October 1945) is an English former footballer who played in the Football League for Middlesbrough and Hartlepool United.

== Career ==
Spraggon was born in Marley Hill. He signed a professional contract with Middlesbrough in November 1962 and made his first-team debut for the club in October 1963.

== Personal life ==
Spraggon is married to Linda, the daughter of former England assistant manager Harold Shepherdson.
