= Thomas McCloskey =

American businessman

Thomas D. McCloskey (May 27, 1924 – October 31, 2004) was a Philadelphia construction magnate. He became the president of McCloskey & Company, Builders, in 1961 when his father, former Democratic National Treasurer Matthew H. McCloskey, was appointed U.S. Ambassador to Ireland.

== Biography ==
McCloskey grew up in the Overbrook section of Philadelphia, where he attended prep school and participated in football and swimming. He attended the University of Pennsylvania and then served in the United States Marine Corps during World War II. He supervised the building of, among others, the Philadelphia Mint, Centre Square, the Mann Music Center, Veterans Stadium, The Spectrum, the 1953 building of the NIH Clinical Center (with John McShain), and RFK Stadium.

He was chair of the Liberty Bowl, shortly before it left Philadelphia. McCloskey was the founder of the Philadelphia Atoms of the North American Soccer League; the team played in McCloskey's Veterans Stadium. After failing in a bid to purchase the NFL's Philadelphia Eagles, he was granted the Tampa Bay Buccaneers expansion franchise. He could not come to terms with the NFL over a payment method, and was replaced as owner by Hugh Culverhouse before the team began play.

McCloskey died of cancer in 2004 at a West Palm Beach hospital. He was survived by a wife, an ex-wife, two sons and two daughters.
