= Jim Fryatt =

English footballer (1940–2020)

Personal information
- Date of birth: 2 September 1940
- Place of birth: Southampton, England
- Date of death: 5 June 2020 (aged 79)
- Place of death: Las Vegas, Nevada, U.S.
- Position: Striker

Youth career
- Charlton Athletic

Senior career*
Years	Team	Apps	(Gls)
1957–1960	Charlton Athletic	5	(3)
1960–1963	Southend United	61	(24)
1963–1966	Bradford Park Avenue	101	(38)
1966–1967	Southport	39	(15)
1967	Torquay United	27	(11)
1967–1968	Stockport County	44	(28)
1968–1970	Blackburn Rovers	37	(5)
1970–1971	Oldham Athletic	76	(40)
1971–1974	Southport	108	(24)
1973	→Philadelphia Atoms (loan)	18	(7)
1974	Philadelphia Atoms	20	(8)
1974	Stockport County	1	(1)
1974–1975	Torquay United	4	(0)
1975	Hartford Bicentennials	6	(1)
1975	Philadelphia Atoms	5	(0)

Managerial career
- 1977: Las Vegas Quicksilvers
- * Club domestic league appearances and goals

James Fryatt (2 September 1940 – 5 June 2020) was an English footballer who played as a striker. During his playing career he was nicknamed Pancho.

== Football League ==
A regular scorer for all of his club sides, the stockily built forward was the archetypal journeyman, spending most of his career switching between lower league sides. However whilst appearing for Bradford Park Avenue against Tranmere Rovers on 25 April 1964 Fryatt established a Football League record by scoring after only four seconds, the fastest goal in the competition's history. Fryatt was well regarded for his time at Stockport County, where his strike partnership with Bill Atkins was so formidable that the two have been inducted into the club's Hall of Fame as a unit. Fryatt signed for Oldham Athletic from Blackburn Rovers for a sum of £8,000 in 1970 and although he only spent 21 months at Boundary Park, he became an instant hit and legend among supporters for scoring 42 goals in 81 appearances in all competitions.

== NASL ==
Like many of his contemporaries Fryatt appeared in the North American Soccer League during the summer months, first appearing in the 1973 season with the title winning Philadelphia Atoms, for whom he scored in the play-offs against Toronto Metros. He returned to the club the following year before finishing his career in the 1975 season initially with Hartford Bicentennials and then back in Philadelphia.

== Post-retirement ==
After retiring as a player, Fryatt served briefly as the assistant manager of the original Las Vegas Quicksilvers before settling permanently in Las Vegas where he worked at casinos before becoming a mechanic for a golf course. He was the father of professional golfer Ed Fryatt. He died 5 June 2020 in Las Vegas.
