= Andy Provan =

Scottish footballer (1944–2023)

Personal information
- Full name: Andrew McKelvie Hughes Provan
- Date of birth: 1 January 1944
- Place of birth: Greenock, Scotland
- Date of death: 11 May 2023 (aged 79)
- Place of death: Torquay, England
- Height: 5 ft 5 in (1.65 m)
- Position: Winger

Senior career*
Years	Team	Apps	(Gls)
- Port Glasgow
1961–1963	St Mirren	8	(0)
1963–1964	Barnsley	3	(0)
1964–1968	York City	160	(49)
1968–1970	Chester	82	(18)
1970–1972	Wrexham	51	(10)
1972–1974	Southport	83	(28)
1973–1974	→ Philadelphia Atoms (loan)	39	(20)
1974–1976	Torquay United	91	(14)
–	Bath City		

International career
1961	Scotland U18	2	(0)
- * Club domestic league appearances and goals

Andrew McKelvie Hughes Provan (1 January 1944 – 11 May 2023), also known as Drew Provan, was a Scottish footballer who played as a winger in the Scottish Football League for St Mirren, in the Football League for Barnsley, York City, Chester, Wrexham, Southport and Torquay United, and in the North American Soccer League for the Philadelphia Atoms. He made two appearances for the Scotland national under-18 team in 1961.

Provan died from complications from Alzheimer's disease in Torquay, on 11 May 2023, at the age of 79.
