= Bob Rigby =

American soccer player (born 1951)

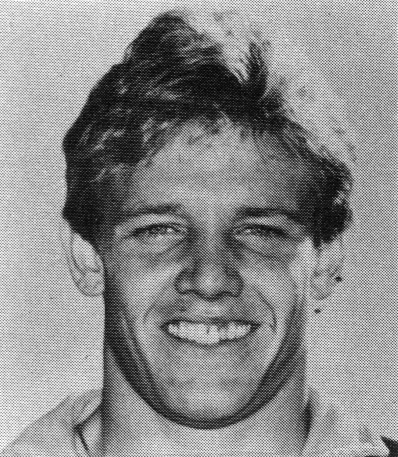
- Rigby circa 1979

Personal information
- Full name: Robert Alan Rigby
- Date of birth: July 3, 1951 (age 75)
- Place of birth: Ridley Park, Pennsylvania, United States
- Height: 6 ft 0 in (1.83 m)
- Position: Goalkeeper

College career
Years	Team	Apps	(Gls)
–1972	East Stroudsburg University		

Senior career*
Years	Team	Apps	(Gls)
1973–1975	Philadelphia Atoms	54	(0)
1976	New York Cosmos	13	(0)
1977–1979	Los Angeles Aztecs	62	(0)
1979–1980	Philadelphia Fury	37	(0)
1979–1980	→ Philadelphia Fever (loan)	12	(0)
1981–1982	Montreal Manic	47	(0)
1981–1982	Montreal Manic (indoor)	9	(0)
1982–1983	Golden Bay Earthquakes (indoor)	9	(0)
1983–1984	Golden Bay Earthquakes	4	(0)
1985	Tacoma Stars (indoor)	5	(0)
1985	San Jose Earthquakes		

International career
1973–1975	United States	6	(0)
- * Club domestic league appearances and goals

Bob Rigby (born July 3, 1951) is an American retired soccer player who played as a goalkeeper. He played twelve seasons in the North American Soccer League, three in the Major Indoor Soccer League, one in the Western Soccer Alliance and earned six caps with the United States men's national soccer team. Rigby was the color commentator with the Philadelphia Union of Major League Soccer.

== Playing career ==
=== Youth ===
Rigby, the son of school teachers, was born in Ridley Park, Pennsylvania. He played soccer while a student at Ridley High School in Folsom, Pennsylvania and continued on the collegiate level at East Stroudsburg (PA) State University and was named a first team All-American in 1972.

=== Professional ===
In 1973, Philadelphia Atoms coach Al Miller, an alumnus of East Stroudsburg University, took Rigby as the first pick in the 1973 NASL college draft. Miller was building his team for the Atoms, which were an expansion franchise that year. Rigby set a league record of 0.62 goals allowed as a rookie that stood until the end of the league. That year, Philadelphia became the first U.S. professional team in any sport to win a championship their first year in existence. Rigby became a local and league hero and found himself on the cover of the September 3, 1973 Sports Illustrated, the first soccer player to be so honored.

Rigby continued to provide positive exposure to the young NASL when he took fourth place in ABC's 1976 Superstars, a televised athletic competition pitting athletes from various sports. February 1974 saw Rigby involved in another significant first. The NASL was toying with the idea of indoor soccer and the Atoms hosted the Red Army of Moscow team in Philadelphia's Spectrum. This was one of the first indoor games to use the configuration familiar to future indoor leagues, an astroturf-covered ice rink with small goals set into the far walls. While the Red Army team won, 6–3, its coach had high praise for Rigby who had stopped 33 of the Soviets' 39 shots.

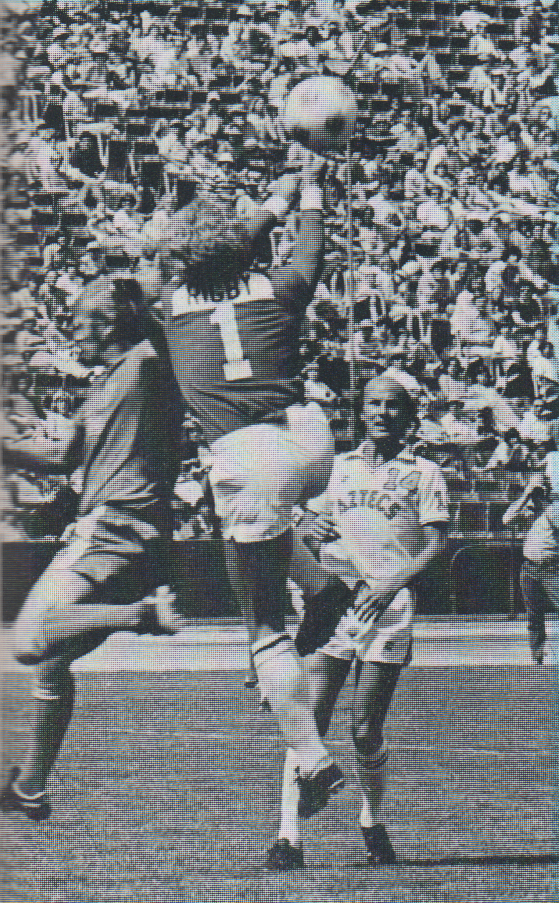
Rigby making a save for the Los Angeles Aztecs (c. 1977–78)

The New York Cosmos acquired Rigby for the 1976 season, only for him to get injured. The Cosmos then brought in Shep Messing to replace him in goal and shipped Rigby to the Los Angeles Aztecs at the end of the season. After three seasons in Los Angeles, Rigby returned to Philadelphia to play for the Fury. The Fury actually acquired Rigby from the Tulsa Roughnecks who got Rigby from the Aztecs the day prior. The Fury attempted to build on the Atoms' popularity by bringing back several fan favorites, but the team only lasted two seasons due to incompetent management.

As Rigby was moving back to Philadelphia, the Major Indoor Soccer League (MISL) was beginning its first season. The next year, the local MISL club, Philadelphia Fever, which had used a largely amateur team its first season, negotiated an associate relationship with the Fury to use several Fury players in its second season. As a result, the Fury loaned Rigby to the Philadelphia Fever for the 1979–1980 Major Indoor Soccer League season.

In 1981, Rigby moved to the Montreal Manic for two seasons before moving to the Golden Bay Earthquakes for the 1982–1983 MISL season. He remained with the Earthquakes for the 1983 and 1984 NASL outdoor season. When the NASL folded after the 1984 season, Rigby was signed by the Chicago Sting on September 19, 1984, for a 15-day contract. The Sting released him at the end of the fifteen days and the Tacoma Stars offered him a contract. Rigby declined the offer to concentrate on his landscaping business. In February 1985, he signed with the Stars after they again offered him a contract. He spent most of the season as a backup to John Baretta.

At the conclusion of the season, Rigby moved back to the Earthquakes, renamed the San Jose Earthquakes. In 1985, the Earthquakes joined with three independent west coast teams to play the Western Alliance Challenge Series. This was the genesis of the short-lived Western Soccer Alliance/League. Rigby shared the goal with Hunter Stern during this challenge series and retired from playing at the end of it.

Rigby was named to two NASL Second All-Star teams, in 1973 and 1974.

=== National and Olympic teams ===
The mid-1970s also saw Rigby play for both the U.S. Olympic and U.S. national teams. While Rigby travelled with the U.S. team to the 1972 Summer Olympics, he did not play. Mike Ivanow played the first two games and Shep Messing the third. On November 3, 1973, Rigby earned his first cap with the national team in a 1–0 loss to Haiti. He played a total of six games, his last coming in a loss to Mexico on August 24, 1975.

== Coaching career ==
During his stint with the San Jose Earthquakes in 1985, Rigby coached the Los Gatos High School boys varsity team. After his retirement, Rigby became the head coach of the Ridley High School in Folsom, Pennsylvania. He remains active as a coach, recently as part of the Star Soccer Academy.

== Broadcaster ==
Rigby served as color commentator for the Philadelphia Union during the 2012 season.
