= Montreal Olympique =

Former soccer team in Montreal, Quebec

- Full name: Montreal Olympique
- Founded: 1971
- Dissolved: 1973
- Stadium: Autostade
- Capacity: 33,172
- League: North American Soccer League
| Home colours | Away colours |

The Montreal Olympique were a Canadian soccer team that competed in the North American Soccer League (NASL) from 1971 to 1973. The team was based in Montreal and played its 1971 and 1973 home matches at Autostade and at the Universite de Montreal Stadium for the 1972 season. Future Liverpool and Scotland national team star Graeme Souness appeared in ten games for the club on loan from Tottenham Hotspur F.C. in 1972 and future National Hockey League player Jim Corsi also played for the Olympique. During the team's three years of competition it failed to qualify for the post season and never had a winning record.

== History ==
The Montreal Olympique were founded on 5 January 1971 with the announcement by Montreal Alouettes owner Sam Berger and North American Soccer League (NASL) chairman Lamar Hunt of Montreal as the ninth, and second Canadian, team for the upcoming 1971 season. In late February 1971 the team hired Italian coach Renato Tofani, who coached Taranto F.C. in Italy's second division the previous season, with Mike Campo named as his assistant. After starting the season with three consecutive losses without scoring a single goal, Tofani resigned as head coach and was replaced on an interim basis by Campo. A month later, with the team having only won a single game, the Olympiques named Sebastiano Buzzin head coach. The Olympiques' 8 August 1971 game against the Rochester Lancers was ended after 65 minutes of play when around 200 Montreal fans stormed the field of play at the Autostade after the Lancer's Francisco Escos scored his team's fourth goal of the match. The fans were angry Escos was not ruled offsides and attempted to attack the referee and linesman. Fans who remained in the stands reportedly threw chairs, one of which hit referee Peter Johnson, knocking him unconscious and requiring stitches. Throughout the season, the team hosted a total of five friendlies against international opponents Heart of Midlothian F.C. from Scotland, Italian club L.R. Vicenza, Shimshon Tel Aviv F.C. from Israel, Greek team Apollon Smyrnis F.C., and Bangu Atlético Clube from Brazil. The team lost four of the matches, only winning the game against Shimshon FC. The Olympiques finished the 1971 NASL season with a league worst record of four wins, five draws and fifteen losses and averaging only 2,440 attendance, also a league worst.

In February 1972, the Olympiques hired former Wycombe Wanderers F.C. and South Korea coach Graham Adams to manage the team. The team considered playing its home matches at Verdun Stadium and Jarry Park Stadium before settling on Universite de Montreal Stadium for its home matches. On 9 April 1972, Welsh international and former Leeds and Juventus center forward John Charles signed to play with the Olympiques. On 6 May 1972, it was announced that Graeme Souness and Mike Dillon had been loaned to the team by the Tottenham Hotspur F.C. Both players would make ten appearances for Montreal with Dillon scoring seven goals. Italian defender Luigi Mascalaito was also brought over on loan from Verona. All three were released during the season by the team at the players' request. As well as playing a series of exhibition matches against Canadian semi-pro and lower division teams, during the summer of 1972, the Olympique hosted Aberdeen F.C. from Scotland, Portuguese club CUF Barreiro, and Werder Bremen from West Germany. The team's match against Aberdeen was halted in the sixty-fifth minute after fans threw objects and invaded the pitch, attempting to attack the Scottish team's players after Joe Harper scored a penalty, giving the Dons a 1-0 lead. The Olympiques ended the 1972 NASL season in third place of the Northern Division with a record of four wins, five draws and five losses and averaging 2,308 fans a game. Prior to the final game of the season against the Dallas Tornado, owner Berger announced that the team had reduced its losses by 75% over the previous season. In February, it was reported the team had lost a combined $400,000 over the 1971 and 1972 seasons. Shortly after the season, Jim Koerner, formally of the St. Louis Stars, was hired as Business and General Manager.

For the 1973 NASL season, the Olympiques moved back to Autostade for its home matches. On 4 May 1983, a week before the opening weekend, Montreal faced the Atlanta Apollos in a pilot contest erroneously reported as the debut of indoor soccer in the United States, losing 8-6. This an exhibition match was actually two years after the first officially sanctioned indoor variant by the North American Soccer League, the 1971 NASL Professional Hoc-Soc Tournament. Montreal hosted three international teams during the summer of 1973, losing the first 3-1 to Finn Harps F.C. with Terry Harkin, who would spend the rest of the summer on loan with the Toronto Metros, scoring all three goals for the Irish team. It was the Harps only win against a professional team during their North American tour. In July, the team drew 1-1 against Mexican team C.D. Veracruz and lost four goals to none to FC Torpedo Moscow in a friendly held after the conclusion of the NASL season, a match which would turn out to be the team's last game. Montreal finished the 1973 season with a record of five wins, four draws and ten losses. In last September 1973, it was reported that the contracts of both GM Koerner and coach Adams had not been renewed and team owner Sam Berger announced that if the team did not find a suitable stadium for soccer, the club would not continue. The team folded shortly thereafter.

== Year-by-year ==
| Year | League | W | L | T | Pts | Reg. season | Playoffs |
|---|---|---|---|---|---|---|---|
| 1971 | NASL | 4 | 15 | 5 | 65 | 4th, Northern Division | did not qualify |
| 1972 | NASL | 4 | 5 | 5 | 57 | 3rd, Northern Division | did not qualify |
| 1973 | NASL | 5 | 10 | 4 | 64 | 2nd, Northern Division | did not qualify |

== Notable players ==
- (England) Kieron Baker (1971)
- (England) Keith Pointer (1971-1972)
- (England) Clive Charles (1971-1972)
- (Argentina) Raúl Decaria (1971-1972)
- (England) Ken Wallace (1971)
- (Italy) Renzo Selmo (1971-1972)
- (Italy) Franco Gallina (1971)
- (Bermuda) Sam Nusum (1972-1973)
- (England) Dennis Walker (1972-1973)
- (Italy) Luigi Mascalaito (1972-1973)
- (Scotland) Graeme Souness (1972)
- (England) Mike Dillon (1972)
- (Canada) Chris Horrocks (1972-1973)

== Former coaches ==
- (Italy) Renato Tofani (1971)
- (Spain) Mike Campo (1971)
- (Italy) Sebastiano Buzzin (1971)
- (England) Graham Adams (1972–73)

== See also ==
- Montreal Manic
- Montreal Supra
- Montreal Impact (1992–2011)
- CF Montréal
