= George O'Neill (footballer, born 1942) =

Soccer player (born 1942)

Personal information
- Full name: George O'Neill
- Date of birth: 26 July 1942 (age 84)
- Place of birth: Port Glasgow, Scotland
- Position: Left half

Senior career*
Years	Team	Apps	(Gls)
1962–1964	Celtic	0	(0)
1964–1965	Barrow	7	(0)
1964–1965	Ayr United	4	(0)
1965–1966	Dunoon Athletic		
1966–1970	Partick Thistle	72	(5)
1969–1971	Greenock Morton	36	(2)
1970–1972	Dunfermline Athletic	25	(3)
1972–1973	St Mirren	2	(0)
1973–1976	Philadelphia Atoms	52	(4)

International career
1973	United States	2	(0)

Managerial career
- 1978–1980: Philadelphia Fever
- 1980: Philadelphia Fury (assistant)
- 1993: University of Pennsylvania (interim)
- 1994–1997: University of Pennsylvania
- * Club domestic league appearances and goals

George O'Neill (born 26 July 1942) is a former professional soccer player who played as a left half. He began his career in Scotland, playing with eight clubs over nine seasons before moving to the Philadelphia Atoms of the North American Soccer League. He retired from playing professionally in 1976. In 1973, he earned two caps with the U.S. national team.

== Club career ==
=== Scotland ===
O'Neill was born in Port Glasgow, Scotland. He signed for Scottish club Celtic in November 1962, but never entered the first team. After two seasons, he moved to Barrow of the English Football League Division Four for the 1964–65 season. He played seven games with Barrow before transferring back north to Ayr United. He finished out the 1964–65 season with Ayr, playing only four games. He then moved to Scottish Amateur Football League club Dunoon Athletic for the 1965–66 season. Whether this was a loan from Ayr or a transfer remains unknown. In 1966, he joined Partick Thistle where he finally found significant playing time. Over his four seasons with the club, he played 72 games and scored five goals. He then moved to Morton for a little more than a season before transferring on 16 March 1971 to Dunfermline Athletic. He saw time in twenty-five games before moving to St Mirren in 1972. He played only two games with St Mirren before leaving Scotland for the United States.

=== NASL ===
In 1973, O'Neill signed with the expansion Philadelphia Atoms of the North American Soccer League. That year, the Atoms won the NASL championship. He remained with the team until it folded following the 1976 season.

== International career ==
In 1973, O'Neill earned two caps with the U.S. national team. The first came in a 1–0 loss to Haiti on 3 November 1973. The second was another 1–0 loss to Haiti two days later.

== Coaching career ==
In 1978, O'Neill was hired to coach the Philadelphia Fever of the Major Indoor Soccer League until he was fired in 1980. He then replaced Derek Trevis as the assistant coach of the Philadelphia Fury of the NASL. He spent several years as a coach with the Philadelphia Inter Soccer Club before becoming the interim head coach of the University of Pennsylvania men's soccer team on 18 August 1993 after Steve Baumann resigned. He led the team to a 5–10 record before being named to the head coach position. He was then hired as the team's head coach in January 1994. O'Neill was fired following the 1997 season after he amassed a 28–47–4 record over his five seasons as head coach.

== See also ==
- List of United States men's international soccer players born outside the United States
