= List of New York Cosmos (1970–1985) players =

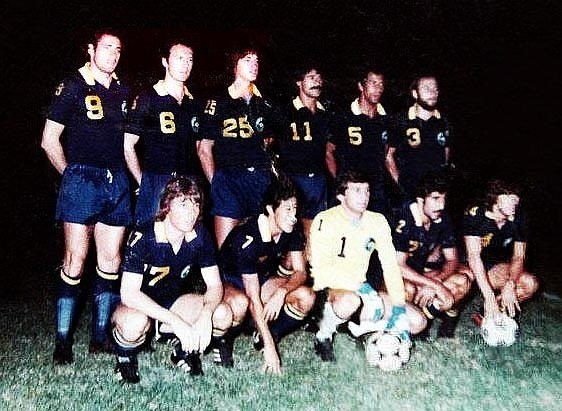
The Cosmos before playing a friendly match v. Club Cipolletti in Argentina, March 1980. Giorgio Chinaglia (9), Franz Beckenbauer (6) and Carlos Alberto Torres (5) were part of the line up

The New York Cosmos were an American soccer club based in New York. The club was formed in 1970 by brothers Ahmet and Nesuhi Ertegun, with the support of Warner Brothers president Steve Ross, and entered into the North American Soccer League (NASL), which had itself been founded in 1968. Backed by Ross's company, Warner Communications, the Cosmos became the league's strongest club, both on and off the field. The team won five titles while drawing attendances unprecedented in American club soccer. The Cosmos' commercial and on-field success declined during the early 1980s, along with the NASL itself, and after the league folded in 1984 the club dissolved a year later. A new Cosmos team, formed in 2010, is scheduled to begin play in the new second-tier North American Soccer League (contested since 2011) during the 2013 season.

All players who played at least one league match for the Cosmos are given below. A total of 155 outfield players did so, along with 17 goalkeepers, giving a total of 172. Including the United States and Canada, a total of 34 nations from across the Americas, Europe, the Middle East and Africa were represented on the team's rosters over the course of its history. After the United States, the most common nation of origin was England, with 17 Cosmos players; Canada followed with 15. NASL all-star teams included 18 of the club's players in total. Eleven players who appeared as guests in exhibition games are listed separately below.

== Regular season players ==
=== Keys ===
- GK: Goalkeeper
- DF: Defender
- MF: Midfielder
- FW: Forward

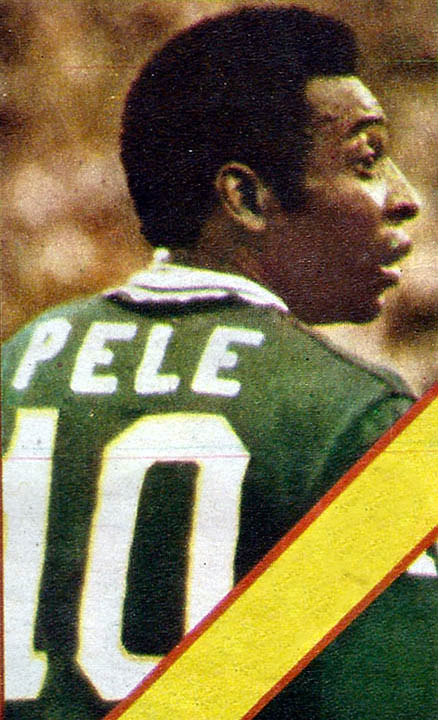
Pelé is the only player to have his number retired when the team put his #10 out of circulation in 1977

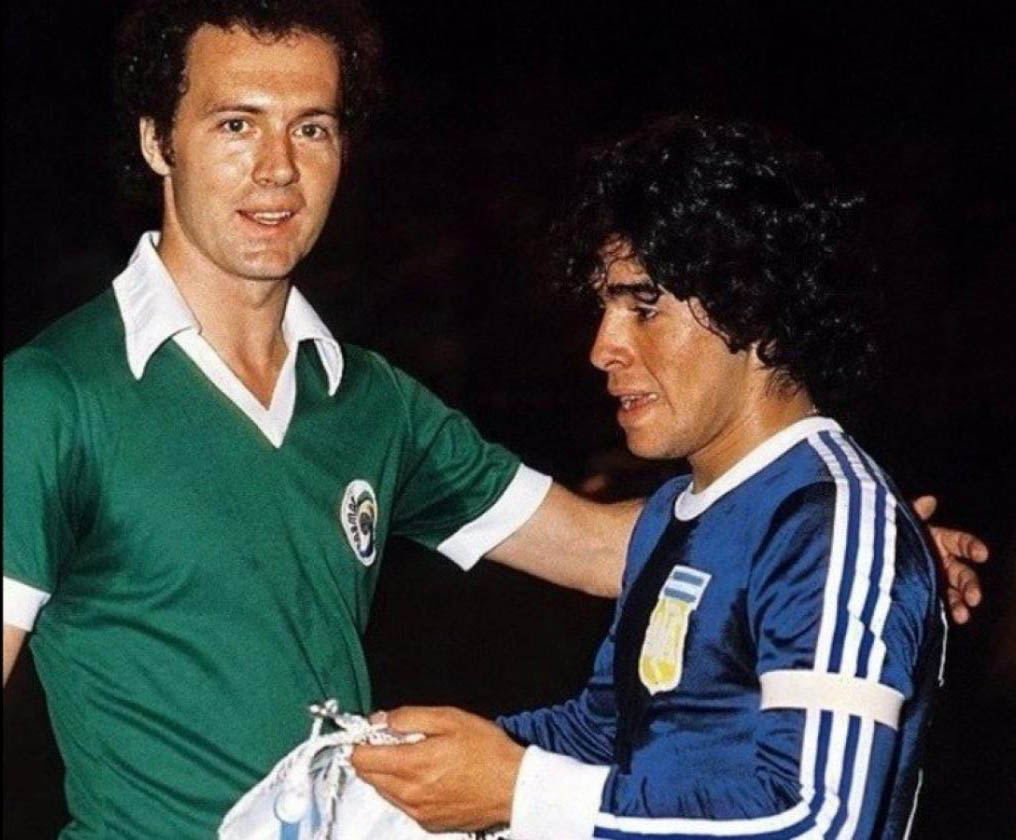
Franz Beckenbauer with Argentine Diego Maradona in 1980

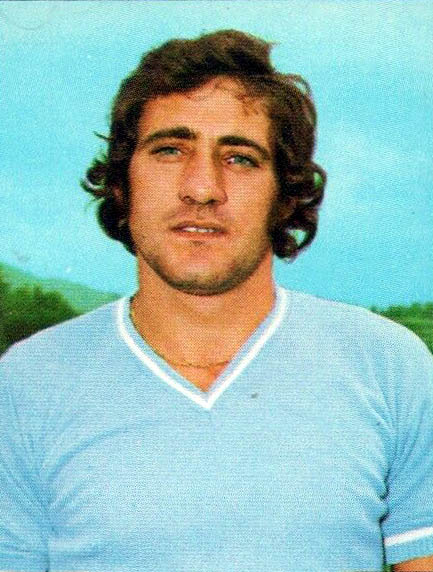
Giorgio Chinaglia, Cosmos' all-time leading scorer

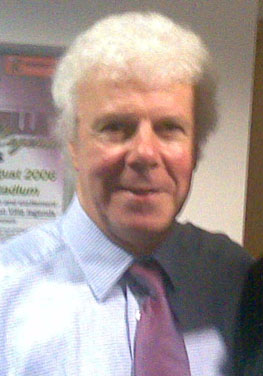
Charlie Aitken, seen in 2006

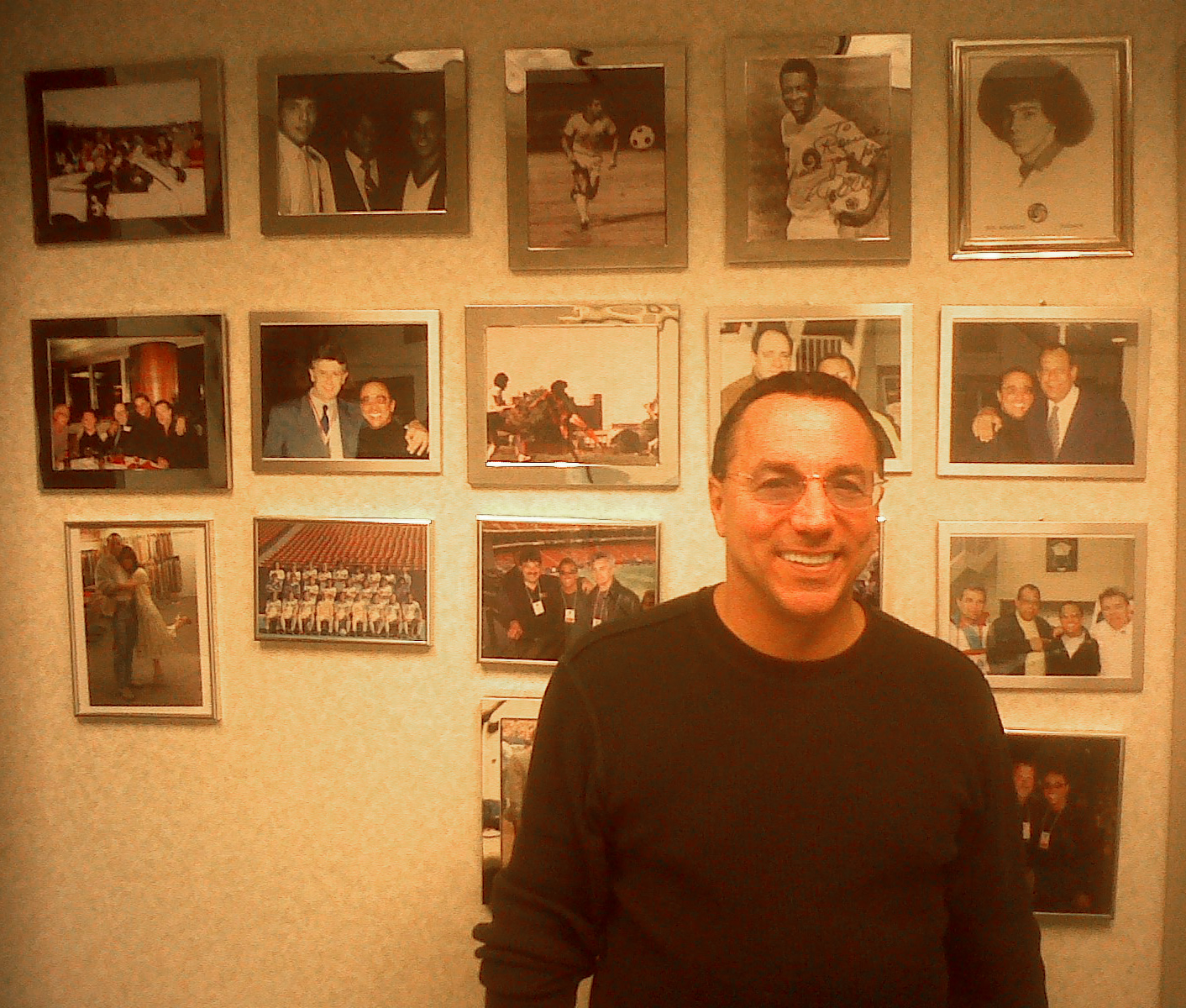
Ron Atanasio, pictured in 2010 with Cosmos memorabilia

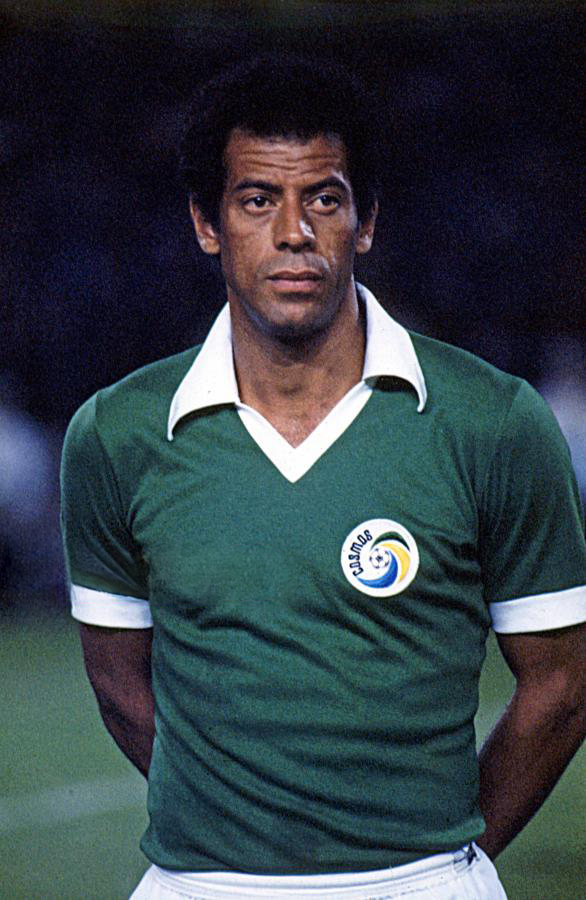
Carlos Alberto Torres had two tenures on the Cosmos, 1977–80, and 1982

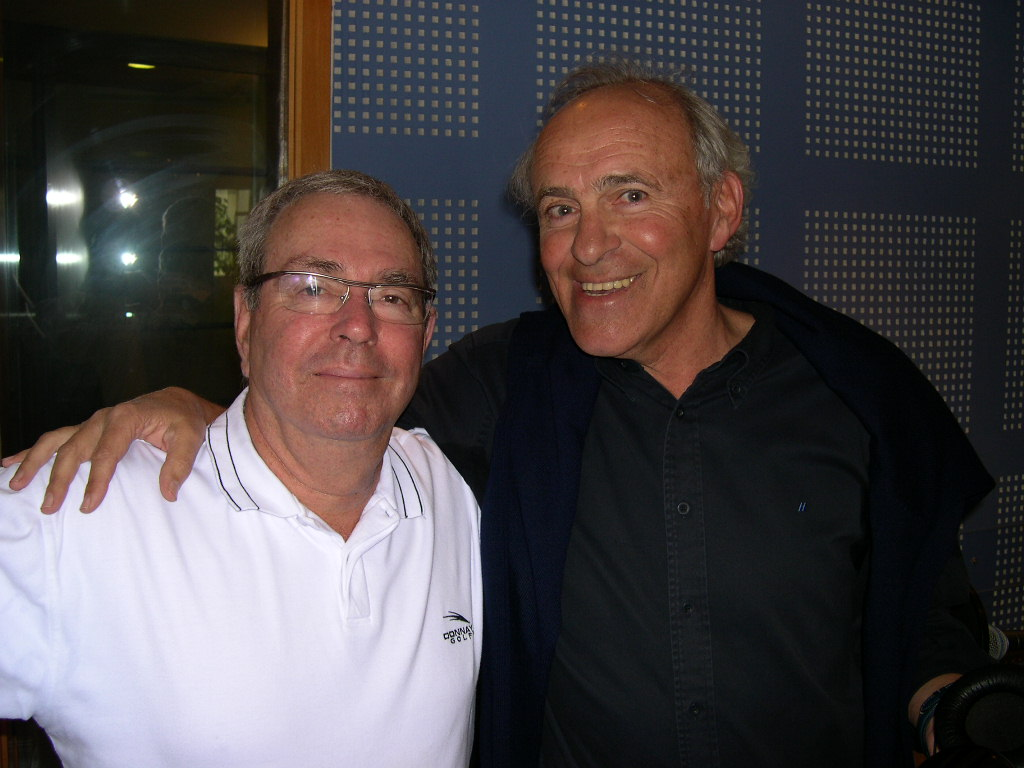
Mordechai Spiegler, right, pictured in 2008 with broadcaster Yoram Arbel

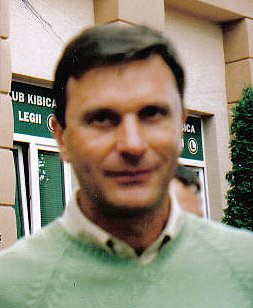
Władysław Żmuda, seen in 2007

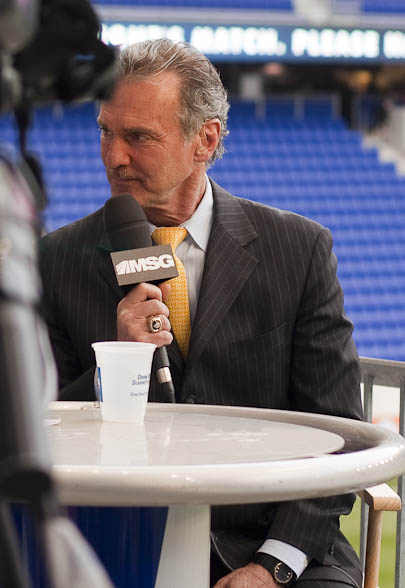
Shep Messing, the Cosmos' goalkeeper from 1973 to 1974, then again from 1976 to 1977 and finally for three games in 1984, reports on a New York Red Bulls – Philadelphia Union match in 2010

| Name | Country | Pos. | Tenure | No. | Ref. |
|---|---|---|---|---|---|
| Laurie Abrahams | England | FW | 1984–85 | 14 | |
| Norberto Luna | United States | FW | 1982-84 | | |
| Chris Agoliati | United States | MF | 1977 | 33 | – |
| Charlie Aitken | Scotland | DF | 1976–77 | 17 | – |
| Dino Alberti | Canada | GK | 1980–82 | 27 | – |
| Carlos Alberto | Brazil | DF | 1977–80, 1982 | 25, 5 | – |
| Luis Alberto | United States | MF | 1984–85 | 18 | – |
| Amr Aly | United States | FW | 1984–85 | 13 | – |
| Angelo Anastasio | United States | DF | 1974–75 | 22 | – |
| Ron Atanasio | United States | FW | 1978–79 | 26 | – |
| Garry Ayre | Canada | DF | 1978–79 | 24 | – |
| Boris Bandov | United States | MF | 1979–82 | 18 | – |
| Dominick Barczewski | United States | DF | 1981–82 | 25 | – |
| Franz Beckenbauer | West Germany | DF | 1977–80, 1983 | 6 | – |
| Hubert Birkenmeier | West Germany | GK | 1979–85 | 1, 19 | – |
| Richard Blackmore | England | GK | 1972 | 0 | – |
| Vladislav Bogićević | Yugoslavia | MF | 1978–84 | 8 | – |
| Chico Borja | United States | FW | 1981–82, 1984 | 28 | – |
| Gordon Bradley | United States | DF | 1971–75 | 24 | ^{[A]} |
| Jack Brand | Canada | GK | 1978 | 0 | – |
| David Brcic | United States | GK | 1977–79, 1981–84 | 20, 21 | – |
| Ivan Buljan | Yugoslavia | DF | 1981–82 | 22 | – |
| Roberto Cabañas | Paraguay | FW | 1980–84 | 19, 9 | – |
| Omar Caetano | Uruguay | MF | 1975 | 15 | – |
| Dan Canter | United States | DF | 1984–85 | 3, 18 | – |
| Antonio Carbognani | Argentina | MF | 1979 | 16 | – |
| Emanuel Carrette | Brazil | FW | 1974 | 12 | – |
| Carlos Caszely | Chile | FW | 1984 | 16 | – |
| Delices Chardin | Haiti | DF | 1971 | 12 | – |
| Giorgio Chinaglia | Italy | FW | 1976–85 | 9 (Note: Chinaglia's #9 would be retired in June 2014 by the current Cosmos franchise.) | – |
| Richard Chinapoo | Trinidad and Tobago | DF | 1982–83 | 14, 30, 33 | – |
| Chinesinho | Brazil | MF | 1971 | 7 | – |
| Dave Clements | Northern Ireland | MF | 1976–77 | 6, 26 | – |
| Elvis Comrie | United States | FW | 1984–85 | 11 | – |
| Julio Correa | Uruguay | MF | 1975 | 7 | – |
| Everald Cummings | Trinidad and Tobago | MF | 1972–73 | 20 | – |
| Oscar Damiani | Italy | FW | 1984 | 7, 31 | – |
| Rick Davis | United States | MF | 1978–84 | 17, 6 | – |
| Malcolm Dawes | England | DF | 1973–74 | 5, 8, 6 | – |
| Dé | Brazil | DF | 1975 | 14 | – |
| Roberto De Oliveira | United States | FW | 1977 | 34 | – |
| Pedro DeBrito | United States | MF | 1984 | 22 | – |
| Jaime Delgado | Ecuador | FW | 1971 | 7 | – |
| Ferdinando De Matthaeis | Italy | FW | 1982, 1983–84 | 29 | – |
| Angelo DiBernardo | United States | FW | 1980–85 | 16 | – |
| Mike Dillon | England | DF | 1975–77 | 20 | – |
| Vito Dimitrijević | Yugoslavia | MF | 1977–78 | 3, 15 | – |
| Frank Donlavey | Canada | DF | 1971, 1974 | 4, 3 | – |
| Tony Donlic | United States | FW | 1975–78 | 7, 16 | – |
| Jeff Durgan | United States | DF | 1980–82, 1983–85 | 4, 24, 25 | – |
| Kevin Eagan | United States | DF | 1979 | 22 | – |
| Keith Eddy | England | DF | 1976–77 | 5 | – |
| Andranik Eskandarian | Iran | DF | 1979–85 | 2 | – |
| Gary Etherington | United States | FW | 1977–79 | 21 | – |
| Drew Ferguson | Canada | MF | 1984–85 | 17 | – |
| Vidal Fernandez | United States | MF | 1980 | 26 | – |
| Tony Field | England | FW | 1976–77 | 7 | – |
| Joey Fink | United States | FW | 1973–75 | 12 | – |
| Kyriakos Fitilis | Greece | MF | 1971 | 19 | – |
| Santiago Formoso | United States | DF | 1978–79 | 5, 25 | – |
| Mike Fox | United States | MF | 1983–84 | 23 | – |
| Chance Fry | United States | FW | 1984–85 | 7 | – |
| Luis de la Fuente | Spain | DF | 1975 | 22, 23 | – |
| Terry Garbett | England | MF | 1976–79 | 8, 14 | – |
| Darryl Gee | United States | FW | 1980–84 | 24, 5 | – |
| Gerry Gray | Canada | MF | 1983–84 | 25 | – |
| Alan Green | United States | FW | 1983–85 | 15 | – |
| Fred Grgurev | United States | FW | 1978 | 18 | – |
| Ernie Hannigan | Scotland | FW | 1971 | 6 | – |
| Theodor Hasekidis | Greece | FW | 1971 | 5 | – |
| Helenio Herrera | Spain | FW | 1972 | 9 | – |
| Randy Horton | Bermuda | FW | 1971–74 | 16 | – |
| Larry Hulcer | United States | MF | 1980–81 | 12 | – |
| Stephen Hunt | England | FW | 1977–78, 1982 | 11, 17 | ^{[B]} |
| Paul Hunter | Canada | DF | 1977 | 26 | – |
| Robert Iarusci | Canada | DF | 1977–78, 1981–83 | 3, 19 | – |
| Godfrey Ingram | England | FW | 1979 | 30 | |
| Harold Jarman | England | MF | 1974 | 7 | – |
| Josef Jelinek | Czechoslovakia | FW | 1972–73 | 10 | – |
| Karol Kapciński | Poland | DF | 1971–73 | 19 | – |
| Erhardt Kapp | United States | DF | 1981–83 | 26, 17 | – |
| John Kerr | Canada | MF | 1972–75 | 6, 18 | – |
| Emmanuel Kofie | Ghana | GK | 1971–72 | 21, 1 | – |
| Konrad Kornek | Poland | GK | 1971 | 1 | – |
| Refik Kozić | Yugoslavia | DF | 1983–84 | 22 | – |
| Kurt Kuykendall | United States | GK | 1975–76 | 0, 1 | – |
| Alfredo Lamas | Uruguay | MF | 1975 | 5 | – |
| Farouk Gaafar | Egypt | MF | 1979–80 | 4 | – |
| Roberto Landi | Italy | GK | 1983 | | |
| Doc Lawson | United States | DF | 1984–85 | 19, 32 | – |
| Mark Liveric | United States | FW | 1974–75 | 8, 29 | – |
| Flemming Lund | Denmark | FW | 1985 | 30, 15 | – |
| Barry Mahy | United States | DF | 1971–75 | 2 | – |
| Carmine Marcantonio | Canada | MF | 1984 | 27 | – |
| Gil Mărdărescu | Romania | MF | 1975 | 14 | – |
| Manoel Maria | Brazil | FW | 1975 | 19 | – |
| Marinho | Brazil | DF | 1979 | 3 | – |
| Juan Masnik | Uruguay | DF | 1975 | 3 | – |
| Andy Mate | United States | MF | 1971 | 9 | – |
| Charlie McCully | United States | FW | 1971–72 | 3 | – |
| Henry McCully | United States | FW | 1973 | 3 | – |
| Wes McLeod | Canada | MF | 1984–85 | 8 | – |
| Robert Meschbach | United States | MF | 1985 | 32 | – |
| Shep Messing | United States | GK | 1973–74, 1976–77, 1984 | 1, 33 | – |
| Horst Meyer | West Germany | DF | 1971 | 6 | – |
| Wilberforce Mfum | Ghana | FW | 1971–72 | 17 | – |
| Ramón Mifflin | Peru | MF | 1975–78 | 15 | – |
| Maurizio Minieri | Italy | GK | 1971 | 23 | – |
| Charlie Mitchell | Scotland | DF | 1976 | 19 | – |
| Radi Mitrovic | Yugoslavia | DF | 1971 | 12 | – |
| Bela Monoki | Hungary | MF | 1974 | 15, 22 | – |
| Nelsi Morais | Brazil | MF | 1975–80 | 14, 3, 31, 23, 30 | – |
| Steve Moyers | United States | FW | 1982–84 | 12 | – |
| Johan Neeskens | Netherlands | MF | 1979–84 | 13 | – |
| Robert Neubauer | West Germany | DF | 1972 | 5 | – |
| Mickey Niblock | Northern Ireland | FW | 1973 | 7 | – |
| David Norris | Canada | FW | 1981–82 | 23 | – |
| Sam Nusum | Bermuda | GK | 1975 | 1 | – |
| Yasin Özdenak | Turkey | GK | 1977–79 | 1 | |
| Alan O'Neill | England | MF | 1971 | 8 | – |
| Tommy Ord | England | FW | 1975–76 | 23, 9 | – |
| Oscar | Brazil | DF | 1980 | 4 | – |
| Andy Papoulias | United States | MF | 1985 | 31 | – |
| Américo Paredes | Uruguay | FW | 1975 | 9 | – |
| Andrew Parkinson | United States | FW | 1984–85 | 20 | – |
| Rudolph Pearce | Jamaica | DF | 1971 | 18, 24 | – |
| Pelé | Brazil | FW | 1975–77 | 10 (Note: When Pelé retired from football in 1977, the number was put out of circulation by the franchise. and retired again in July 2013 by the second club of the same name.) | – |
| Tony Picciano | United States | DF | 1975 | 5, 18 | – |
| Denny Poe | United States | MF | 1977–78 | | |
| David Primo | Israel | DF | 1975 | 22 | – |
| Karim Abdul Razak | Ghana | MF | 1979–81 | 28 | – |
| Gerry Reardon | Ireland | MF | 1984 | 30 | – |
| Len Renery | United States | DF | 1973–74 | 23 | – |
| Bob Rigby | United States | GK | 1976 | 0, 1 | – |
| Wim Rijsbergen | Netherlands | DF | 1979–83 | 15 | – |
| Rildo | Brazil | DF | 1977 | 23 | – |
| Germy Rivera | Ecuador | MF | 1974 | 20 | – |
| Romerito | Paraguay | MF | 1980–83 | 7 | – |
| Werner Roth | United States | DF | 1972–79 | 4 | – |
| Karol Rotner | Israel | DF | 1973 | 2 | – |
| Brian Rowan | Scotland | DF | 1975–76 | 17, 3 | – |
| Greg Ryan | United States | DF | 1979 | 12 | – |
| Carlos Scott | United States | MF | 1974–75 | 10, 17 | – |
| Seninho | Portugal | FW | 1978–82 | 11, 12 | – |
| Steve Sharp (Note: Played only in the indoor soccer team.) | United States | FW | 1985 | | |
| Mordechai Spiegler | Israel | FW | 1974–77 | 21 | – |
| Jorge Siega | United States | FW | 1971–76 | 11 | – |
| Bobby Smith | United States | DF | 1976–78 | 12 | – |
| Jomo Sono | South Africa | FW | 1977 | 22 | – |
| Scoop Stanisic | United States | GK | 1984–85 | 0 | |
| Stan Startzell | United States | MF | 1972 | 14 | – |
| Jan Steadman | Trinidad and Tobago | DF | 1971 | 20 | – |
| Scott Strasburg | United States | FW | 1977 | 30 | – |
| Siegfried Stritzl | United States | MF | 1971–73 | 15 | – |
| Jerry Sularz | Poland | GK | 1973–75 | 0 | – |
| Stanisław Terlecki | Poland | FW | 1983–84 | 14 | – |
| Brian Tinnion | England | FW | 1976 | 18 | – |
| Jadranko Topić | Yugoslavia | FW | 1977 | 18 | – |
| Dennis Tueart | England | FW | 1978–79 | 7 | – |
| Bruce Twamley | Canada | DF | 1977 | 22, 2 | – |
| François Van der Elst | Belgium | FW | 1980–81 | 20 | – |
| Tibor Vigh | Canada | FW | 1973 | 18 | – |
| Geoff Vowden | England | FW | 1974 | 19 | – |
| Dragan Vujović | Yugoslavia | FW | 1983–85 | 11, 13 | – |
| Michael Wardrop | England | MF | 1974 | 14 | – |
| Steve Wegerle | South Africa | FW | 1981–82 | 14 | – |
| Bruce Wilson | Canada | DF | 1980 | 3 | – |
| Giuseppe Wilson | Italy | DF | 1978–79 | 23 | – |
| Ralph Wright | England | DF | 1973 | 14 | – |
| Ceyhan Yazar | Turkey | FW | 1971 | 8 | – |
| John Young | Scotland | MF | 1971 | 5 | – |
| Roby Young | Israel | FW | 1972–73 | 8 | – |
| Dieter Zajdel | Poland | MF | 1972–73 | 22 | – |
| Władysław Żmuda | Poland | DF | 1984 | 6, 34 | – |

=== By nationality ===
| Country | Number of players |
|---|---|
| Argentina | 1 |
| Belgium | 1 |
| Bermuda | 2 |
| Brazil | 10 |
| Canada | 15 |
| Chile | 1 |
| Czechoslovakia | 1 |
| Denmark | 1 |
| Ecuador | 2 |
| Egypt | 1 |
| England | 17 |
| West Germany | 4 |
| Ghana | 3 |
| Greece | 2 |
| Haiti | 1 |
| Hungary | 1 |
| Iran | 1 |
| Ireland | 1 |
| Israel | 4 |
| Italy | 6 |
| Jamaica | 1 |
| Netherlands | 2 |
| Northern Ireland | 2 |
| Paraguay | 2 |
| Peru | 1 |
| Poland | 6 |
| Portugal | 1 |
| Romania | 1 |
| Scotland | 5 |
| South Africa | 2 |
| Spain | 2 |
| Trinidad and Tobago | 3 |
| Turkey | 2 |
| United States | 57 |
| Uruguay | 5 |
| Yugoslavia | 7 |

== Guest players ==
Some well-known players from other teams turned out for the Cosmos in exhibition matches on a game-by-game basis when New York traveled on overseas tours. These guest players are listed below, along with the year they appeared in Cosmos colors.

| Name | Country | Position | Year |
|---|---|---|---|
| John Coyne | England | FW | 1975 |
| Gordon Banks | England | GK | 1976 |
| Clyde Best | Bermuda | FW | 1976 |
| Clodoaldo | Brazil | MF | 1977 |
| Rivellino | Brazil | MF | 1978 |
| Alan Willey | England | FW | 1978 |
| Stewart Jump | England | DF | 1978 |
| Joe Horváth | Hungary | MF | 1978 |
| Laszlo Harsanyi | Hungary | DF | 1978 |
| Arsène Auguste | Haiti | DF | 1978 |
| Johan Cruyff | Netherlands | MF | 1978 (Note: Only played in two exhibition matches.) |

== Footnotes ==
A. Bradley held the position of player-coach.
B. Hunt's 1982 spell was on loan from Coventry City (England).
C. Ingram played for the Cosmos on loan from Luton Town (England).
D. Yasin Özdenak played in the United States under the name Erol Yasin, and is generally referred to as such in NASL records.
E. Although Eskandarian signed permanently for the Cosmos in 1979, he is counted as a guest player for 1978, and so appears on both lists.
