= 1975 New York Cosmos season =

New York Cosmos
1975 season
- Manager: (United States) Gordon Bradley
- Stadium: Downing Stadium
- NASL: Division: 3rd Overall: 12th Playoffs: Did not qualify
- National Challenge Cup: Did not enter
- Top goalscorer: League: (United States) Joey Fink (6 goals) (Israel) Mordechai Spiegler (6 goals); All: N/A
- Highest home attendance: 22,500 vs. TOR (June 18)
- Lowest home attendance: 5,227 vs. CON (June 4)
- Average home league attendance: 10,450

The 1975 New York Cosmos season was the fifth season for the New York Cosmos in the now-defunct North American Soccer League. In the Cosmos' fifth year of existence the club finished 3rd in the five-team Northern Division and 12th out of 20 in the overall league table. Despite Pelé joining the club midseason in what English writer Gavin Newsham said was "the transfer coup of the century," bringing unprecedented attention to soccer in the United States, the Cosmos missed the playoffs for the second straight year.

== Squad ==
Note: Flags indicate national team as defined under FIFA eligibility rules; some limited exceptions apply. Players may hold more than one non-FIFA nationality.

No.	Pos.	Nation	Player
0	GK	POL	Jerry Sularz
0,1	GK	USA	Kurt Kuykendall
1	GK	BER	Sam Nusum
2	DF	USA	Barry Mahy
3	DF	URU	Juan Masnik
4	DF	USA	Werner Roth
5	MF	URU	Alfredo Lamas
6	MF	CAN	John Kerr, Sr.
1	GK	ARG	Florial Rodriguez
8	FW	USA	Mark Liveric
9	FW	URU	Americo Paredes
10	FW	BRA	Pelé
11	FW	USA	Jorge Siega
12	FW	USA	Joey Fink
14	DF	USA	Gordon Bradley
14	MF	ROU	Gil Mărdărescu

No.	Pos.	Nation	Player
14	MF	BRA	Nelsi Morais
14	DF	BRA	De
15	DF	URU	Omar Caetano
15	MF	PER	Ramon Mifflin
16	FW	USA	Tony Donlic
17	DF	SCO	Brian Rowan
17	MF	USA	Carlos Scott
18	DF	USA	Tony Picciano
19	FW	BRA	Manoel Maria
20	DF	ENG	Mike Dillon
21	FW	ISR	Mordechai Spiegler
22	DF	USA	Angelo Anastasio
22	DF	ISR	David Primo
22,23	DF	ESP	Luis De La Fuente
23	FW	ENG	Tommy Ord

== Results ==
=== Preseason ===
Date	Opponent	Venue	Result	Attendance	Scorers
March 1, 1975	Miami Toros	N	1-0	N/A	N/A
March 3, 1975	Victory Club	A	0-1	N/A	N/A

=== Regular season ===
Pld = Games Played, W = Wins, L = Losses, GF = Goals For, GA = Goals Against, Pts = Points
6 points for a win, 1 point for a shootout win, 0 points for a loss, 1 point for each goal scored (up to three per game).

==== Northern Division Standings ====
Pos	Club	Pld	W	L	GF	GA	GD	Pts
1	Boston Minutemen	22	13	9	41	29	+12	116
2	Toronto Metros-Croatia	22	13	9	39	28	+11	114
3	New York Cosmos	22	10	12	39	38	+1	91
4	Rochester Lancers	22	6	16	29	49	-20	64
5	Hartford Bicentennials	22	6	16	27	51	-24	61

==== Overall League Placing ====
Pos	Club	Pld	W	L	GF	GA	GD	Pts
10	Chicago Sting	22	12	10	39	33	+6	106
11	Vancouver Whitecaps	22	11	11	38	28	+10	99
12	New York Cosmos	22	10	12	39	38	+1	91
13	Philadelphia Atoms	22	10	12	33	42	-9	90
14	Baltimore Comets	22	9	13	34	52	-18	87

==== Matches ====
Date	Opponent	Venue	Result	Attendance	Scorers
April 30, 1975	Miami Toros	H	2–3	9,328	Liveric, Correa
May 3, 1975	Tampa Bay Rowdies	A	1–0	8,378	
May 7, 1975	Baltimore Comets	H	5–1	7,016	Fink (3), Liveric, Correa
May 14, 1975	Connecticut Bicentennials	H	1–1 (SOL)	6,103	Fink
May 19, 1975	Toronto Metros-Croatia	A	1–2	4,796	Dillon, Liveric
May 28, 1975	Vancouver Whitecaps	H	0–1	7,331	
June 4, 1975	Connecticut Bicentennials	H	2–1	5,227	Paredas, Liveric
June 7, 1975	Rochester Lancers	A	3–2	4,959	Spiegler (2)
June 10, 1975	Philadelphia Atoms	A	1–0	20,124	
June 18, 1975	Toronto Metros-Croatia	H	2–0	22,500	Correa, Spiegler
June 27, 1975	Rochester Lancers	A	0–3	14,562	Siega, Pelé, Fink
June 29, 1975	Washington Diplomats	A	2–09	35,620	Spiegler (2), Paredas, Pelé (2), Kerr, Fink, Mahy, Maria
July 3, 1975	Los Angeles Aztecs	A	5–1	12,176	Spiegler
July 5, 1975	Seattle Sounders	A	2–0	17,925	
July 9, 1975	Boston Minutemen	H	3–1	18,126	De La Fuente, Correa, Kerr
July 16, 1975	Portland Timbers	H	1–2	13,423	Pelé
July 19, 1975	Toronto Metros-Croatia	A	3–0	21,573	
July 23, 1975	San Jose Earthquakes	H	1–1 (SOW)	11,137	Pelé
July 30, 1975	Rochester Lancers	H	2–0	8,217	Ord (2)
August 1, 1975	Connecticut Bicentennials	A	3–1	8,546	Liveric
August 3, 1975	Boston Minutemen	A	5–0	4,445	
August 6, 1975	Boston Minutemen	H	1–0	6,541	Paredas

=== Friendlies ===
Date	Opponent	Venue	Result	Att.	Scorers	Ref.
March 3	(Haiti) Victory	A	1–0	24,000	n/a	
Apr 1	(United States) Miami Toros	A	1–0	11,000	Liveric	
May 22	Israel	H	1–1	n/a	Dillon	
June 15	(United States) Dallas Tornado	H	2–2	22,278	Spiegler?, Pelé	
July 7	(Canada) Vancouver Whitecaps	A	2–1	26,495	n/a	
July 27	(United States) Dallas Tornado	A	2–3	26,127	n/a	
August 10	(United States) St. Louis Stars	A	1–2	10,180	n/a	
August 27	(United States) San Jose Earthquakes	A	2–3	19,338	Pelé (2)	
August 31	(Sweden) Malmö FF	A	1–5	21,000	Pelé	
September 2	(Sweden) Swedish All-Stars	A	3–1	20,448	Pelé (2), Ord	
September 4	(Sweden) Stockholm Alliansen	A	2–3	55,000	Pelé (2)	
September 11	(Norway) Valerengens	A	4–2		Pele (2), Shpigler, Ord	
September 13	(Italy) Roma	A	1–3	49,700	Coyne	
September 17	(Haiti) Victory	A	2–1		Ord, Paredes	
September 19	Violette A.C.	A	1–2		Mifflin	
September 21	(Jamaica) Santos	A	0–1			
September 26	Puerto Rico	A	12–1		Mifflin (3), Ord (3), Liveric (2), Manoel Maria (2), Pele, Coyne	
September 28	(Haiti) Violette	A	0–0	30,000	–	
September 30	(Canada) Toronto Metros-Croatia	A	n/a	n/a	n/a	
October 2	Windsor Stars	A	n/a	n/a	n/a	

== See also ==
- 1975 North American Soccer League season
