= 1976 New York Cosmos season =

New York Cosmos
1976 season
- Manager: (England) Ken Furphy (Until June 28) (United States) Gordon Bradley (After June 28)
- Stadium: Yankee Stadium
- NASL: Division: 2nd Overall: 2nd Playoffs: Conf. Semifinals
- National Challenge Cup: Did not enter
- Top goalscorer: League: (Italy) Giorgio Chinaglia (19 goals); All: (Italy) Giorgio Chinaglia (23+ goals)
- Highest home attendance: 28,536 vs. CHI (May 2)
- Lowest home attendance: 6,917 vs. ROC (June 30)
- Average home league attendance: 18,227
Home colors	Away colors

The 1976 New York Cosmos season was the sixth season for the New York Cosmos in the now-defunct North American Soccer League. In the Cosmos' sixth year of existence the club finished second only to the Tampa Bay Rowdies in both the five-team Eastern Division and the 20-team league. The Cosmos returned to the playoffs for the first time in two years, but were eliminated in the conference semifinals by the rival Rowdies. 1976 marked the first year for Giorgio Chinaglia with the club; Chinaglia would go on to become the all-time leading scorer in both Cosmos and NASL history.

== Squad ==
Note: Flags indicate national team as defined under FIFA eligibility rules; some limited exceptions apply. Players may hold more than one non-FIFA nationality.

No.	Pos.	Nation	Player
1	GK	USA	Kurt Kuykendall
1	GK	USA	Shep Messing
1	GK	USA	Bob Rigby
2	DF	USA	Barry Mahy
3	DF	SCO	Brian Rowan
4	DF	USA	Werner Roth
5	DF	ENG	Keith Eddy
6	MF	NIR	Dave Clements
7	FW	ENG	Tony Field
8	MF	ENG	Terry Garbett
9	FW	ITA	Giorgio Chinaglia

No.	Pos.	Nation	Player
9	FW	ENG	Tommy Ord
10	FW	BRA	Pelé
11	FW	USA	Jorge Siega
12	DF	USA	Bobby Smith
14	MF	BRA	Nelsi Morais
15	MF	PER	Ramon Mifflin
16	FW	USA	Tony Donlic
17	DF	SCO	Charlie Aitken
18	FW	ENG	Brian Tinnion
19	DF	SCO	Charlie Mitchell
20	DF	ENG	Mike Dillon

== Results ==
=== Preseason ===
Date	Opponent	Venue	Result	Attendance	Scorers
March 21, 1976	San Diego Jaws	A	1–1	N/A	N/A
March 28, 1976	Dallas Tornado	A	0–1	20,214	N/A
March 31, 1976	San Antonio Thunder	A	1–0	20,000	
April 4, 1976	Los Angeles Aztecs	N	0–0	15,000	
April 7, 1976	Honda F.C.	N	5–0	N/A	N/A
April 8, 1976	Honda F.C.	N	5–0	21,705	N/A
April 9, 1976	Seattle Sounders	A	1–2	58,125	Pelé, Clements
April 11, 1976	Los Angeles Aztecs	A	0–1	29,232	Pelé

=== Regular season ===
Pld = Games Played, W = Wins, L = Losses, GF = Goals For, GA = Goals Against, Pts = Points
6 points for a win, 1 point for a shootout win, 0 points for a loss, 1 point for each goal scored (up to three per game).

==== Eastern Division Standings ====
Pos	Club	Pld	W	L	GF	GA	GD	Pts
1	Tampa Bay Rowdies	24	18	6	58	30	+28	154
2	New York Cosmos	24	16	8	65	34	+31	148
3	Washington Diplomats	24	14	10	46	38	+8	126
4	Philadelphia Atoms	24	8	16	32	49	−17	80
5	Miami Toros	24	6	18	29	58	−29	63

==== Overall League Placing ====
Pos	Club	Pld	W	L	GF	GA	GD	Pts
1	Tampa Bay Rowdies	24	18	6	58	30	+28	154
2	New York Cosmos	24	16	8	65	34	+31	148
3	Minnesota Kicks	24	15	9	54	33	+21	138
4	Chicago Sting	24	15	9	52	32	+20	132
5	Washington Diplomats	24	14	10	46	38	+8	126

==== Matches ====
Date	Opponent	Venue	Result	Attendance	Scorers
April 18, 1976	Miami Toros	A	0–1	9,457	Clements
May 2, 1976	Chicago Sting	H	1–2	28,536	Pelé
May 5, 1976	Connecticut Bicentennials	H	3–1	8,439	Pelé, Tinnion, Eddy
May 8, 1976	Philadelphia Atoms	H	1–2	14,287	Pelé
May 15, 1976	Connecticut Bicentennials	A	0–3	8,933	Field (2), Tinnion
May 17, 1976	Los Angeles Aztecs	H	6–0	24,292	Eddy (2), Chinaglia (2), Pelé (2)
May 19, 1976	Boston Minutemen	A	1–2	7,367	Chinaglia (2)
June 6, 1976	Tampa Bay Rowdies	A	5–1	42,611	Field
June 9, 1976	Minnesota Kicks	A	1–2	46,164	Chinaglia, Field
June 12, 1976	Portland Timbers	A	0–3	32,247	Chinaglia (2), Eddy
June 16, 1976	Boston Minutemen	H	2–2 (SOL)	15,101	N/A
June 18, 1976	Toronto Metros-Croatia	H	3–0	18,612	Tinion, Chinaglia, Clements
June 23, 1976	Chicago Sting	A	4–1	28,000	Tinnion
June 27, 1976	Washington Diplomats	A	3–2	11,004	Tinnion, Pelé
June 30, 1976	Rochester Lancers	H	2–0	6,917	Field (2)
July 2, 1976	St. Louis Stars	H	3–1	10,123	Mifflin (2), Eddy
July 7, 1976	Toronto Metros-Croatia	A	0–3	12,123	N/A
July 10, 1976	Philadelphia Atoms	A	1–2	25,311	Pelé, Garbett
July 14, 1976	Tampa Bay Rowdies	H	5–4	27,892	Eddy, Mifflin, Field, Pelé (2)
July 18, 1976	Washington Diplomats	H	5–0	27,398	Mifflin, Chinaglia (2), Pelé, Tinnion
July 23, 1976	Rochester Lancers	A	2–1	5,728	Chinaglia
July 28, 1976	Dallas Tornado	H	4–0	19,119	Chinaglia (3), Mifflin
August 7, 1976	San Jose Earthquakes	A	2–1	23,048	Eddy
August 10, 1976	Miami Toros	H	8–2	18,103	Dillon, Chinaglia (5), Pelé (2)

=== Postseason ===
==== Overview ====
===== First round =====
August 17	Washington Diplomats	0–2	New York Cosmos	New York City, Shea Stadium

August 18	Los Angeles Aztecs	0–2	Dallas Tornado	Irving, Texas Stadium

August 18	Vancouver Whitecaps	0–1	Seattle Sounders	Seattle, Kingdome

August 18	Rochester Lancers	1–2	Toronto Metros-Croatia	Toronto, Varsity Stadium

===== Conference semifinals =====
August 20	Toronto Metros-Croatia	3–2	Chicago Sting	Chicago, Soldier Field

August 20	New York Cosmos	1–3	Tampa Bay Rowdies	Tampa, Tampa Stadium

August 20	Dallas Tornado	0–2	San Jose Earthquakes	San Jose, Spartan Stadium

August 21	Seattle Sounders	0–3	Minnesota Kicks	Bloomington (MN), Metropolitan Stadium

===== Conference Championships =====
August 24	Toronto Metros-Croatia	2–0	Tampa Bay Rowdies	Tampa, Tampa Stadium

August 25	San Jose Earthquakes	1–3	Minnesota Kicks	Bloomington (MN), Metropolitan Stadium

===== Soccer Bowl '76 =====
August 28	Toronto Metros-Croatia	2–0	Minnesota Kicks	Seattle, Kingdome

==== Matches ====
Date	Opponent	Venue	Result	Attendance	Scorers
August 17, 1976	Washington Diplomats	H	2–0	22,698	Garbett, Pelé
August 20, 1976	Tampa Bay Rowdies	A	3–1	36,863	Pelé

=== Friendlies ===
Date	Opponent	Venue	Result	Att.Attendance	Scorers	Ref.
March 24	(United States) San Diego Jaws	A	1–1	18,128	Ord	
March 28	(United States) Dallas Tornado	A	1–0	20,214	Pelé	
March 31	(United States) San Antonio Thunder	A	0–1	14,800	–	
April 4	(United States) Los Angeles Aztecs	N (Note: Held in Tempe, Arizona.)	0–0	15,800	–	
April 8	(Japan) Honda FC	N (Note: Held in Honolulu, Hawaii.)	5–0	21,705	Pelé (4), ?	
April 9	(United States) Seattle Sounders	A	3–1	58,125	Pelé (2), Clements	
April 11	(United States) Los Angeles Aztecs	A	1–0	29,232	Pelé	
June 3	(Haiti) Violette	A	2–1	n/a	n/a	
September 1	(United States) Dallas Tornado	N (Note: Held in Cleveland, Ohio.)	2–2	14,000	Chinaglia (2)	
September 5	(United States) Dallas Tornado	N (Note: Held in New Orleans.)	2–1	12,500	Roth, Mifflin	
September 6	(United States) Dallas Tornado	N (Note: Held in Pontiac, Michigan.)	3–2	23,682	Pele, Morais, Donlic	
September 8	Soccer Canada	A	1–1	14,826	Chinaglia	
September 10	Soccer Canada	A	3–1	14,366	Chinaglia (3)	
September 14	(France) PSG	A	1–3	18,000	Field	
September 16	(Belgium) Royal Antwerp	A	1–3	25,000	Pelé	
September 24	West Japan All-Stars	A	0–0	11,000	n/a	
September 25	East Japan All-Stars	A	2–2	50,000	Dillon, Chinaglia	

== See also ==
- 1976 North American Soccer League season
