= 1971 New York Cosmos season =

New York Cosmos
1971 season
- Manager: (United States) Gordon Bradley
- Stadium: Yankee Stadium
- NASL: Division: 2nd Overall: 4th Playoffs: Semifinals
- National Challenge Cup: Did not enter
- Top goalscorer: League: (Bermuda) Randy Horton (15 goals); All: (Bermuda) Randy Horton (16 goals)
- Highest home attendance: 19,437 (Aug. 2 vs. Rochester)
- Lowest home attendance: 1,897)Jun. 16 vs. St. Louis)
- Average home league attendance: 4,517

The 1971 New York Cosmos season was the inaugural season for the New York Cosmos, an expansion team in the now-defunct North American Soccer League. In the Cosmos' first year of existence, the club finished 2nd in the Northern Division and 4th in the overall league table. In the playoffs, the Cosmos were eliminated by the Atlanta Chiefs in the first two games of the best-of-three semifinals.

== Squad ==
Note: Flags indicate national team as defined under FIFA eligibility rules; some limited exceptions apply. Players may hold more than one non-FIFA nationality.

No.	Pos.	Nation	Player
0	GK	ITA	Maurizio Minieri
1	GK	POL	Conrad Kornek
2	DF	USA	Barry Mahy
3	DF	USA	Charlie McCully
4	DF	CAN	Frank Donlavey
5	DF	SCO	John Young
5	MF	GRE	Theodore Hasekidis
6	MF	GER	Horst Meyer
6	FW	SCO	Ernie Hannigan
7	FW	ECU	Jaime Delgado
8	MF	ENG	Alan O'Neill
8	FW	TUR	Ceyhan Yazar
9	FW	USA	Andy Mate

No.	Pos.	Nation	Player
11	FW	USA	Jorge Siega
12	FW	YUG	Radi Mitrovic
12	DF	HAI	Chardin Delices
15	MF	USA	Siegfried Stritzl
16	FW	BER	Randy Horton
17	FW	GHA	Wilberforce Mfum
18	DF	JAM	Rudolph Pearce
19	MF	GRE	Kyriakos Fitilis
19	DF	POL	Karol Kapcinski
20	DF	TRI	Jan Steadman
21	GK	GHA	Emmanuel Kofie
24	DF	USA	Gordon Bradley

== Results ==
=== Regular season ===
Pld = Games Played, W = Wins, L = Losses, D = Draws, GF = Goals For, GA = Goals Against, Pts = Points
6 points for a win, 3 points for a draw, 0 points for a loss, 1 point for each goal scored (up to three per game).

==== Northern Division Standings ====
Pos	Club	Pld	W	L	D	GF	GA	GD	Pts
1	Rochester Lancers	24	13	5	6	48	31	+17	141
2	New York Cosmos	24	9	10	5	51	55	-4	117
3	Toronto Metros	24	5	10	9	32	47	-15	89
4	Montreal Olympique	24	4	15	5	29	59	-30	65

==== Overall League Placing ====
Pos	Club	Pld	W	L	D	GF	GA	GD	Pts
2	Atlanta Chiefs	24	12	7	5	35	29	+6	120
3	Dallas Tornado	24	10	6	8	38	24	+14	119
4	New York Cosmos	24	9	10	5	51	55	-4	117
5	Washington Darts	24	8	6	10	36	34	+2	111
6	Toronto Metros	24	5	10	9	32	47	-15	89

==== Matches ====
Date	Opponent	Venue	Result	Attendance	Scorers
April 17, 1971	St. Louis Stars	A	1-2	3,701	Mfum, Horton
May 5, 1971	Washington Darts	H	1-0	3,746	Stritzl
May 16, 1971	Toronto Metros	A	2-2	6,751	Stritzl, Siega
May 23, 1971	Montreal Olympique	H	2-3	2,093	McCully, Siega
May 30, 1971	Rochester Lancers	A	2-2	5,343	Horton (2)
June 5, 1971	Dallas Tornado	A	2-0	5,476	
June 9, 1971	Rochester Lancers	H	4-2	2,017	Mfum (3), Horton
June 16, 1971	St. Louis Stars	H	4-1	1,897	Siega, Horton, McCully, Mfum
June 20, 1971	Dallas Tornado	H	3-1	9,000	McCully, Horton, Stritzl
June 23, 1971	Montreal Olympique	A	3-1	1,645	Horton
June 27, 1971	Washington Darts	A	3-1	3,400	Mitrovic
July 3, 1971	Atlanta Chiefs	A	1-3	3,627	Horton (2), Siega
July 10, 1971	Rochester Lancers	A	3-2	4,321	Siega, McCully
July 25, 1971	Toronto Metros	H	2-2	2,132	Horton (2)
August 2, 1971	Rochester Lancers	H	3-2	19,437	McCully, Mahy, Mfum
August 7, 1971	Toronto Metros	A	2-1	4,896	Horton
August 14, 1971	Montreal Olympique	A	5-4	2,387	Horton (3), Siega
August 22, 1971	Toronto Metros	H	2-0	N/A	Siega (2)
August 25, 1971	Montreal Olympique	H	3-3	1,914	Mate (2), Mitrovic
August 29, 1971	Atlanta Chiefs	H	2-1	2,714	Mitrovic, O'Neill

=== Postseason ===
==== Overview ====
===== Semi-finals =====
			Game 1	Game 2	Game 3
Rochester Lancers	-	Dallas Tornado	2 - 1	1 - 3	1 - 2	September 1, 4, 8
Atlanta Chiefs	-	New York Cosmos	1 - 0	2 - 0		September 2, 5

===== Final =====
			Game 1	Game 2	Game 3
Atlanta Chiefs	-	Dallas Tornado	2 - 1	1 - 4	0 - 2	September 12, 15, 19

==== Matches ====
Date	Opponent	Venue	Result	Attendance	Scorers
September 2, 1971	Atlanta Chiefs	A	1-0	3,800	
September 5, 1971	Atlanta Chiefs	H	0-2	N/A	

=== Friendlies ===
Date	Opponent	Venue	Result	Att.	Scorers
May 21	(Scotland) Hearts	H	2–4	2,189	Yazar (2)
May 26	(Italy) Vicenza	H	3–5	4,100	Mitrovic, Mahy, McCully
July 13	(Greece) Apollon Limassol	H	1–1	4,763	Siega
Aug 20	(Brazil) Bangu	H	1–6	2,741	Horton

== See also ==
- 1971 North American Soccer League season
