= List of New York Cosmos (1970–1985) all-stars =

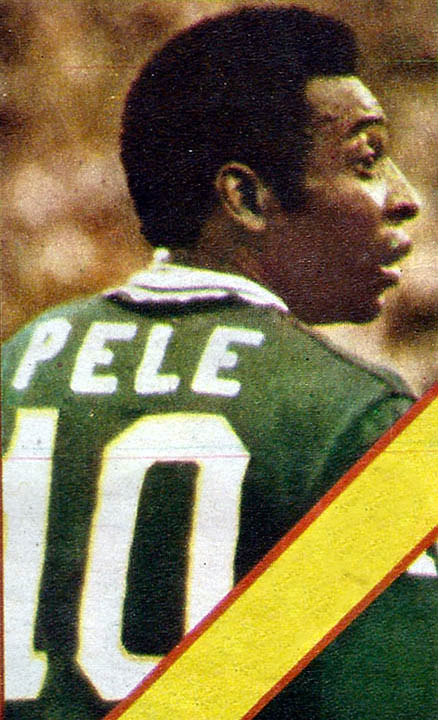
Pelé, pictured in 1977, played for the New York Cosmos from 1975 to 1977. He was named the North American Soccer League's Most Valuable Player in 1976, and appeared in the league's all-star team in each of his three seasons there

The New York Cosmos were an American soccer club based in New York. The team was founded in 1970 by brothers Ahmet and Nesuhi Ertegun, with the support of Warner Brothers president Steve Ross. The Cosmos joined the North American Soccer League (NASL), which was in its fourth season. Backed by the financial resources of Warner Communications, the Cosmos became the league's "marquee club", winning five championships and drawing unprecedented crowds for American club soccer. The side's commercial and on-field success declined during the early 1980s, along with the NASL itself, and it ceased operations in 1985, a year after the league folded. A new Cosmos team, formed in 2010, is scheduled to begin play in the new second-tier North American Soccer League (contested since 2011) during the 2013 season.

The NASL all-star teams selected by the league at the end of each season included a total of 18 Cosmos players.^{[A]} These include numerous well-known players from outside the United States, signed from European or South American clubs. Examples of these are erstwhile West Germany captain Franz Beckenbauer and the former Brazil international players Pelé and Carlos Alberto; there were many others. Among the American players representing the Cosmos were two players born in Yugoslavia: U.S. international defender Werner Roth and Siegfried Stritzl, a midfielder. Canada international John Kerr, originally from Scotland, also turned out for New York during the early 1970s. Former Italy forward Giorgio Chinaglia holds many of the side's records pertaining to individual performance, appearing in the most matches, scoring the most goals and points, and sharing the record for most all-star appearances (six) with Vladislav Bogićević, a member of the Yugoslavia national team before his time with the Cosmos.

Each Cosmos player named to a NASL all-star team is named below, along with his regular season and play-off statistics. The nationality given for each player is based on the national team represented, or his birthplace if he is uncapped. No NASL all-star from the Cosmos was born in the United States or Canada. During the club's 14 NASL seasons, the league's Most Valuable Player (MVP) award was won by a Cosmos player on five occasions, which are also detailed below.

== Key ==
Positions

- GK = Goalkeeper
- DF = Defender
- MF = Midfielder
- FW = Forward

Statistics

- A = Appearances
- G = Goals
- P = Points
- In the NASL, goals counted for two points; assists counted for one.

== NASL all-stars ==
Name	Country	Pos.	Cosmos career	A	G	P	A	G	P	A	G	P	NASL all-star appearances	NASL MVP	Ref.
Name	Country	Pos.	Cosmos career	(Regular season)			(Playoffs)			(Total)			NASL all-star appearances	NASL MVP	Ref.
Siegfried Stritzl	United States	MF	1971–73	18	2	8	4	0	0	22	2	8	1971	–	
Randy Horton	Bermuda	FW	1971–74	88	51	125	5	1	2	93	52	127	1971, 1972	1972	
John Kerr	Canada	MF	1972–75	52	5	15	2	1	2	54	6	17	1972	–	
Werner Roth	United States	DF	1972–79	125	2	10	17	0	2	142	2	12	1975	–	
Pelé	Brazil	FW	1975–77	56	31	89	8	6	17	64	37	106	1975, 1976, 1977	1976	
Keith Eddy	England	DF	1976–77	30	9	20	1	0	0	31	9	20	1976	–	
Ramón Mifflin	Peru	MF	1975–78	44	7	20	5	0	1	49	7	21	1976	–	
Giorgio Chinaglia	Italy	FW	1976–85	213	193	467	41	49	111	254	242	578	1976, 1978, 1979, 1980, 1981, 1982	1981	
Franz Beckenbauer	West Germany	DF	1977–80; 1983	105	19	85	27	4	14	142	23	99	1977, 1978, 1979, 1980, 1983	1977	
Yasin Özdenak	Turkey	GK	1977–79	41	0	0	2	0	0	43	0	0	1978	–	^{[B]}
Giuseppe Wilson	Italy	DF	1978–79	16	0	0	6	0	0	22	0	0	1978	–	
Carlos Alberto	Brazil	DF	1977–80; 1982	100	6	34	26	0	5	126	6	39	1978, 1979, 1980	–	
Vladislav Bogićević	Yugoslavia	MF	1978–84	203	31	209	33	8	35	236	39	244	1978, 1980, 1981, 1982, 1983, 1984	–	
Wim Rijsbergen	Netherlands	DF	1979–83	86	2	18	16	1	5	102	3	23	1979, 1981	–	
Johan Neeskens	Netherlands	MF	1979–84	94	17	62	13	3	8	107	20	70	1979, 1984	–	
Andranik Eskandarian	Iran	MF	1979–85	142	0	21	22	0	4	164	0	25	1982, 1983, 1984	–	
Roberto Cabañas	Paraguay	FW	1980–84	86	60	151	13	3	14	99	63	165	1983	1983	
Hubert Birkenmeier	West Germany	GK	1979–85	145	0	0	23	0	0	168	0	0	1984	–	

== Footnotes ==
A. Counting multiple all-star selections separately, these 18 players made 41 NASL all-star appearances.
B. Yasin Özdenak played in the United States under the name Erol Yasin, and is generally referred to as such in NASL records.
