= 1978 New York Cosmos season =

Cosmos
1978 season
- General manager: Krikor Yepremian
- Manager: (Italy) Eddie Firmani
- Stadium: Giants Stadium
- NASL: Division: 1st Overall: 1st Playoffs: Champions
- National Challenge Cup: Did not enter
- CONCACAF Champions' Cup: Did not enter
- Top goalscorer: League: (Italy) Giorgio Chinaglia (34? goals); All: (Italy) Giorgio Chinaglia (goals)
- Highest home attendance: 74,901 vs. TB (August 27)
- Lowest home attendance: 26,325 vs. BJR (September 9)
- Average home league attendance: 47,856
| Home colors | Away colors |

The 1978 New York Cosmos season was the eighth season for the Cosmos in the now-defunct North American Soccer League. It was also the second and final year in which "New York" was dropped from their name. The double-winning club set records for most wins and points in an NASL season, thanks to their 24-6 regular-season mark (shared with the Vancouver Whitecaps) and 212 points, securing their second premiership on the way to their third championship. They beat the Fort Lauderdale Strikers 7–0 on opening day and never looked back, scoring 88 times while losing just three games in regulation. Giorgio Chinaglia scored 34 goals and 79 points, setting league records in the process. In Soccer Bowl '78, the Cosmos defeated the Tampa Bay Rowdies in front of 74,901 fans at Giants Stadium, still to this day a record for attendance at a North American championship soccer game.

== Squad ==
Note: Flags indicate national team as defined under FIFA eligibility rules; some limited exceptions apply. Players may hold more than one non-FIFA nationality.

| No. | Pos. | Nation | Player |
|---|---|---|---|
| 0 | GK | CAN | Jack Brand |
| 1 | GK | TUR | Erol Yasin |
| 2 | DF | USA | Bobby Smith |
| 3 | MF | BRA | Nelsi Morais |
| 4 | DF | USA | Werner Roth |
| 5 | DF | BRA | Carlos Alberto |
| 6 | DF | GER | Franz Beckenbauer |
| 7 | FW | ENG | Dennis Tueart |
| 8 | MF | YUG | Vladislav Bogićević |
| 9 | FW | ITA | Giorgio Chinaglia |
| 11 | FW | ENG | Steve Hunt |
| 12 | FW | POR | Seninho |
| 14 | MF | ENG | Terry Garbett |

| No. | Pos. | Nation | Player |
|---|---|---|---|
| 15 | MF | YUG | Vito Dimitrijević |
| 16 | FW | USA | Tony Donlic |
| 17 | MF | USA | Rick Davis |
| 18 | FW | USA | Fred Grgurev |
| 19 | DF | CAN | Robert Iarusci |
| 20 | GK | USA | David Brcic |
| 21 | FW | USA | Gary Etherington |
| 22 | MF | USA | Jim Millinder |
| 23 | DF | ITA | Giuseppe Wilson |
| 24 | DF | CAN | Garry Ayre |
| 25 | DF | USA | Santiago Formoso |
| 26 | FW | USA | Ron Atanasio |
| 27 | FW | USA | Joe Filian |

== Results ==
=== Regular season ===
Pld = Games Played, W = Wins, L = Losses, GF = Goals For, GA = Goals Against, Pts = Points
6 points for a win, 1 point for a shootout win, 0 points for a loss, 1 point for each goal scored (up to three per game).

==== National Eastern Division Standings ====
| Pos | Club | Pld | W | L | GF | GA | GD | Pts |
|---|---|---|---|---|---|---|---|---|
| 1 | Cosmos | 30 | 24 | 6 | 88 | 39 | +49 | 212 |
| 2 | Washington Diplomats | 30 | 16 | 14 | 55 | 47 | +8 | 145 |
| 3 | Toronto Metros-Croatia | 30 | 16 | 14 | 58 | 47 | +11 | 144 |
| 4 | Rochester Lancers | 30 | 14 | 16 | 47 | 52 | -5 | 131 |

==== Overall League Placing ====
| Pos | Club | Pld | W | L | GF | GA | GD | Pts |
|---|---|---|---|---|---|---|---|---|
| 1 | Cosmos | 30 | 24 | 6 | 88 | 39 | +49 | 212 |
| 2 | Vancouver Whitecaps | 30 | 24 | 6 | 68 | 29 | +39 | 199 |
| 3 | Detroit Express | 30 | 20 | 10 | 68 | 36 | +32 | 176 |
| 4 | Portland Timbers | 30 | 20 | 10 | 50 | 36 | +14 | 167 |
| 5 | New England Tea Men | 30 | 19 | 11 | 62 | 39 | +23 | 165 |

==== Season matches ====
- April 2 = New York Cosmos 7, Fort Lauredale Strikers 0 Giants Stadium 44,442
- April 9 = New York Cosmos 1, Los Angeles Aztecs 0 Rose Bowl 23,681
- April 16 = New York Cosmos 1, Tulsa Roughnecks 0 Giants Stadium 41,216
- April 23 = New York Cosmos 3, Dallas Tornado 1 Giants Stadium 50,127
- April 30 = New York Cosmos 5, Tampa Bay Rowdies 2 Tampa Stadium 41,888
- May 7 = New York Cosmos 2, Detroit Express 0 Giants Stadium 45,321
- May 14 = New York Cosmos 4, Colorado Caribous 3 Mile High Stadium 15,041
- May 17 = New York Cosmos 1, Portland Timbers 1 (Portland wins in a shootout) Civic Stadium 12,484
- May 21 = New York Cosmos 5, Seattle Sounders 1 Giants Stadium 71,219
- May 24 = Memphis Rogues 1, New York Cosmos 0 Liberty Bell Memorial Stadium 11,222
- May 28 = New York Cosmos 5, Rochester Lancers 1 Giants Stadium 41,305
- June 1 = New York Cosmos 5, Toronto Metros-Croatia 1 Varsity Stadium 16,233
- June 4 = New York Cosmos 3, Vancouver Whitecaps 2 Giants Stadium 44,675
- June 11 = New York Cosmos 1, Philadelphia Fury 0 Giants Stadium 42,385
- June 13 = New York cosmos 4, Minnesota Kicks 2 Metropolitan Stadium 46,370
- June 18 = New York Cosmos 6, Washington Diplomats 1 Giants Stadium 47,700
- June 21 = New York Cosmos 3, Colorado Caribous 1 Giants Stadium 32,476
- June 24 = Fort Lauderdale Strikers 5, New York Cosmos 3 Lockhart Stadium Attendance 13,569
- June 28 = New York Cosmos 2, Los Angeles Aztecs 1 Giants Stadium Attendance 42,231
- July 2 = New York Cosmos 4, California Surf 1 Giants Stadium Attendance 42,140
- July 5 = New England Tea Men 1, New York Cosmos 0 Foxboro Stadium Attendance 30,126
- July 7 = New York Cosmos 2, Rochester Lancers 0 Holleder Memorial Stadium Attendance 12,504
- July 12 = New England Tea Men 3, New York Cosmos 1 Giants Stadium Attendance 62,497
- July 15 = New York Cosmos 3, Philadelphia Fury 0 Veterans Stadium Attendance 19,279
- July 21 = New York Cosmos 5, Oakland Stompers 1 Oakland-Alameda County Coliseum Attendance 20,704
- July 22 = New York Cosmos 2, Seattle Sounders 1 Kingdome Attendance 36,610
- July 26 = New York Cosmos 3, Toronto Metros-Croatia 1 Giants Stadium Attendance 50,178
- July 30 = New York Cosmos 2, Tampa Bay Rowdies 1 Giants Stadium Attendance 60,032
- August 2 = New York Cosmos 2, Washington Diplomats 1 Robert F. Kennedy Stadium Attendance 17,095
- August 5 = Dallas Tornado 5, New York Cosmos 3 Ownby Stadium Attendance 11,213
- August 9 = New York Cosmos 5, Seattle Sounders 2 Giants Stadium Attendance 47,780

=== Postseason ===
==== Overview ====
Conference Quarterfinals
A1 | Detroit Express | 1
A8 | Philadelphia Fury | 0
A2 | New England Tea Men | 1
A7 | Fort Lauderdale Strikers | 3
A3 | San Diego Sockers | 2
A6 | California Surf | 1
A4 | Tampa Bay Rowdies | 3
A5 | Chicago Sting | 1
N1 | Cosmos | 5
N8 | Seattle Sounders | 2
N3 | Minnesota Kicks | 3
N6 | Tulsa Roughnecks | 1
N2 | Vancouver Whitecaps | 4
N7 | Toronto Metros-Croatia | 0
N4 | Portland Timbers | 2
N5 | Washington Diplomats | 1

Conference Semifinals
A1 | Detroit Express | 1
A7 | Fort Lauderdale Strikers | 2
A3 | San Diego Sockers | 1
A4 | Tampa Bay Rowdies | 2
N1 | Cosmos | 2
N3 | Minnesota Kicks | 1
N2 | Vancouver Whitecaps | 0
N4 | Portland Timbers | 2

Conference Championships
A7 | Fort Lauderdale Strikers | 1
A4 | Tampa Bay Rowdies | 2
N1 | Cosmos | 2
N4 | Portland Timbers | 0

Soccer Bowl '78
A4 | Tampa Bay Rowdies | 1
N1 | Cosmos | 3

=== Friendlies ===
Cosmos in Argentina

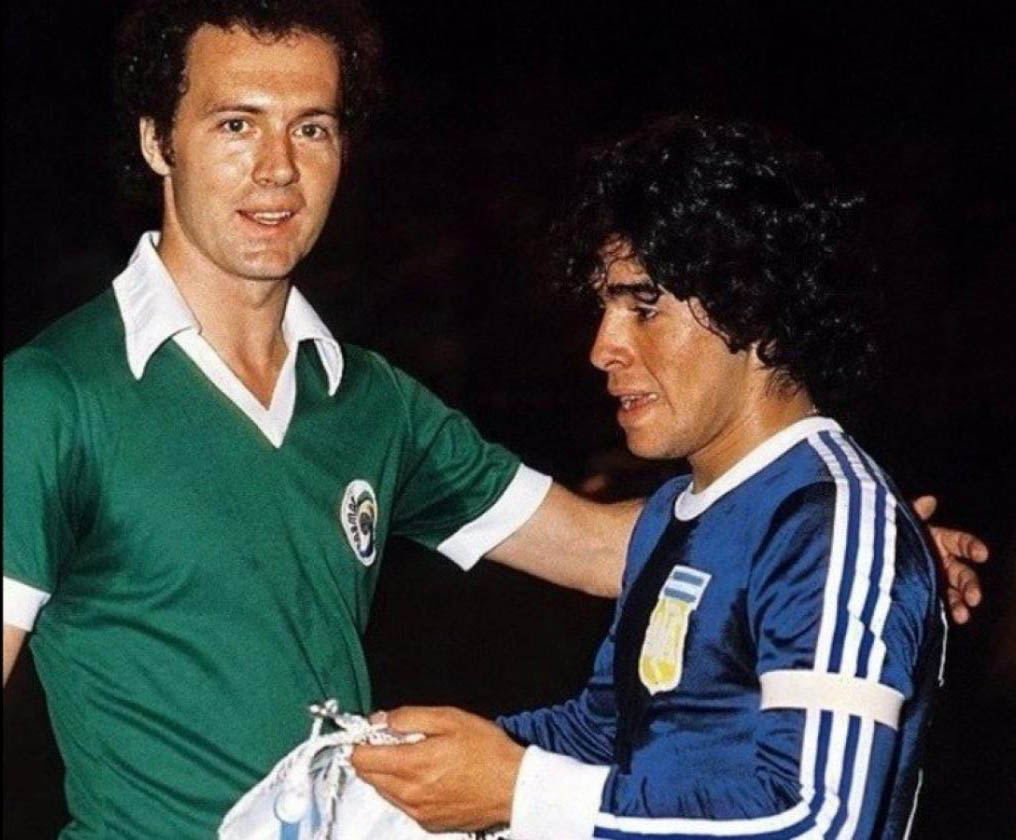
vs Argentina U-20: Franz Beckenbauer and Diego Maradona

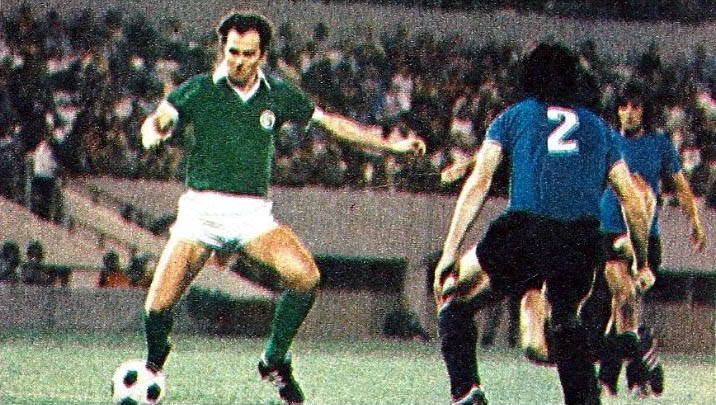
vs Belgrano in Córdoba

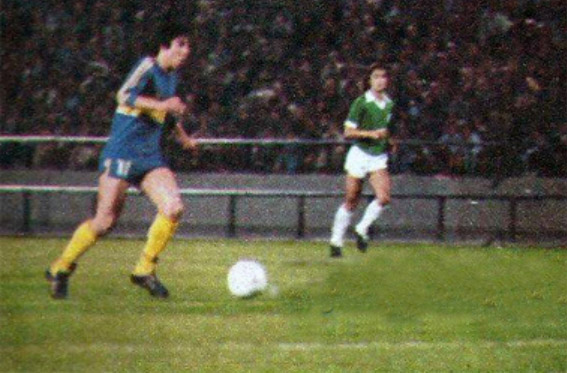
vs Boca Juniors in Mar del Plata

| Date | Opponent | Venue | Result | Att. | Scorers | Ref. |
|---|---|---|---|---|---|---|
| Feb 2 | (United States) FIU (Note: Athletics of Florida International University.) | A | 2–0 | 300 | Chinaglia (2) | |
| March 5 | Bermuda | A | 4–1 | 7,000 | Grgurev, Chinaglia (2), Tueart | |
| March 8 | Bermuda U-23 | A | 3–0 | 4,000 | Chinaglia (2), Millinder | |
| March 11 | Bermuda | A | 4–1 | 5,000 | Tueart (2), Chinaglia, Bogićević | |
| March 22 | (United States) Adelphi University | H | 11–0 | n/a | Chinaglia (2), Bogićević (2), n/a | |
| Apr 4 | (United States) Los Angeles Aztecs | A | 0–0 | 15,000 | – | |
| August 30 | (United Nations) World All-Stars (Note: Johan Cruyff played (as guest star) for the Cosmos wearing #30, being his last match in the United States.) | H | 2–2 | 50,757 | Seninho, Chinaglia | |
| September 4 | (Spain) Atlético Madrid | H | 1–3 | 35,140 | Rivellino (Note: Special guest star for NY Cosmos.) | |
| September 9 | (Argentina) Boca Juniors | H | 2–2 | 23,000 | Chinaglia (2) | |
| September 12 | (Germany) Bayern Munich | A | 1–7 | 75,000 | Chinaglia | |
| September 14 | (Italy) Brescia | A | 2–1 | 30,000 | Tueart, Chinaglia | |
| September 19 | (Germany) VfB Stuttgart | A | 1–6 | 55,000 | Chinaglia | |
| September 21 | (Germany) Freiburger FC | A | 0–2 | 18,000 | – | |
| September 26 | (England) Chelsea | A | 1–1 | 39,659 | Tueart | |
| October 1 | (Spain) Atlético Madrid | A | 3–2 | 45,000 | Seninho, Chinaglia, Bogićević | |
| October 4 | (Greece) AEK Athens | A | 5–3 | 16,526 | Chinaglia (3), Tueart, Seninho | |
| October 9 | (Socialist Federal Republic of Yugoslavia) Red Star Belgrade | A | 4–6 | 23,500 | Tueart, Chinaglia, Seninho | |
| November 1 | (Ecuador) Barcelona | A | 1–1 | 50,000 | Chinaglia | |
| November 3 | Argentina U-20 | A (Note: Held in Estadio La Ciudadela, home of San Martín de Tucumán.) | 1–2 | n/a | Chinaglia | |
| November 7 | (Argentina) Belgrano (C) | A (Note: Held in El Gigante de Alberdi (home of C.A. Belgrano).) | 1–1 | n/a | Chinaglia | |
| November 13 | (Argentina) Independiente Rivadavia | A (Note: Held in Estadio Malvinas Argentinas.) | 2–1 | n/a | Davis, Beckenbauer | |
| November 16 | (Argentina) Boca Juniors | A (Note: Held in Estadio José María Minella, Mar del Plata.) | 2–4 | 35,000 | Chinaglia, Seninho | |
| November 18 | (Bolivia) Bolívar/Always Ready (Note: Combined team with players from both clubs.) | A (Note: Held in Estadio Hernando Siles, La Paz.) | 0–2 | n/a | – | |
| November 22 | (Brazil) Vila Nova | A | 3–2 | 25,000 | Chinaglia (2), Tueart | |

== See also ==
- 1978 North American Soccer League season
