= List of New York Cosmos =

List of New York Cosmos may refer to:

- List of New York Cosmos (1970–85) all-stars
- List of New York Cosmos (1970–85) players
- List of New York Cosmos (1970–85) seasons
