= Carlos Scott =

Bolivian-American soccer player (born 1952)

Personal information
- Date of birth: January 18, 1952 (age 74)
- Place of birth: La Paz, Bolivia
- Height: 6 ft 1 in (1.85 m)
- Position: Midfielder

Youth career
- Adelphi University

Senior career*
Years	Team	Apps	(Gls)
1974–1975	New York Cosmos	14	(3)
1979–1980	Hartford Hellions (indoor)	1	(0)

International career
1975	United States	1	(0)
- * Club domestic league appearances and goals

Carlos Scott is a retired Bolivian-American soccer midfielder who spent two seasons in the North American Soccer League, one in the Major Indoor Soccer League and earned one cap with the U.S. national team.

Scott attended Adelphi University, where he starred on the men's soccer team in the early 1970s. He played in fourteen games over two years with the New York Cosmos in the North American Soccer League in 1974 and 1975. He wore number ten, but gave it up to Pelé when he signed with the Cosmos. Scott earned his one cap with the national team in a 3–1 loss to Costa Rica on August 19, 1975. He played one game for the Hartford Hellions during the 1979-1980 Major Indoor Soccer League season.
