= Rudolph Pearce =

Jamaican footballer (born 1945)

Personal information
- Date of birth: 18 December 1945 (age 80)
- Place of birth: Kingston, Jamaica
- Position: Defender

Senior career*
Years	Team	Apps	(Gls)
1967	Atlanta Chiefs	11	(0)
1971	New York Cosmos	18	(0)
Total		29	(0)

International career
1965–1968	Jamaica		
- * Club domestic league appearances and goals

Rudolph Pearce (born 18 December 1945) is a Jamaican footballer who played at both professional and international levels as a defender.

== Career ==
=== Club career ===
Pearce spent two seasons in the NPSL and NASL, playing for the Atlanta Chiefs in 1967 and the New York Cosmos in 1971.

=== International career ===
Pearce was a member of the Jamaican national side between 1965 and 1968, appearing in six FIFA World Cup qualifying matches.
