= Jadranko Topić =

Yugoslav footballer

Personal information
- Date of birth: 20 August 1949 (age 77)
- Place of birth: Mostar, SFR Yugoslavia
- Position: Striker

Senior career*
Years	Team	Apps	(Gls)
1969–1977	Velež Mostar		
1977	New York Cosmos	6	(1)
- * Club domestic league appearances and goals

Jadranko Topić (born 20 August 1949) is a Yugoslavian former professional footballer who played as a striker.

== Career ==
Topić played for FK Velež Mostar.

He also spent one season in the North American Soccer League, making six appearances for the New York Cosmos in 1977.
