= Dé (footballer, born 1940) =

Brazilian footballer

Personal information
- Full name: Ademar José Ribeiro
- Date of birth: 18 February 1940
- Place of birth: Guariba, Brazil
- Date of death: 12 April 1992 (aged 52)
- Place of death: Santos, Brazil
- Position: Left back

Youth career
- Portuguesa Santista

Senior career*
Years	Team	Apps	(Gls)
1961–1968	Portuguesa Santista		
1968	São Paulo	16	(0)
1969–1971	Palmeiras	127	(5)
1973	Portuguesa Santista		
1974	Noroeste		
1975	New York Cosmos	14	(3)
Total		157	(8)
- * Club domestic league appearances and goals

Ademar José Ribeiro (18 February 1940 – 12 April 1992), commonly known as Dé, was a Brazilian football player who played as a left back. He played in the NASL.

== Career statistics ==
=== Club ===
Club	Season	League			Cup		Other		Total	
Club	Season	Division	Apps	Goals	Apps	Goals	Apps	Goals	Apps	Goals
New York Cosmos	1975	NASL	14	3	0	0	0	0	14	3
Career total			14	3	0	0	0	0	14	3

== Honours ==
Palmeiras

- Torneio Roberto Gomes Pedrosa: 1969
