= Jaime Delgado =

Ecuadorian footballer (born 1943)

Personal information
- Date of birth: January 11, 1943 (age 83)
- Place of birth: Ecuador
- Position: Midfielder

Youth career
- Juventud Italiana

Senior career*
Years	Team	Apps	(Gls)
1965–1968	Emelec		
1971	New York Cosmos	24	(6)
1972	Miami Gatos	1	(0)
Total		25	(6)
- * Club domestic league appearances and goals

Jaime Delgado (born January 11, 1943) is a former Ecuadorian soccer player who played in the NASL.

== Career statistics ==
=== Club ===
Club	Season	League			Cup		Other		Total	
Club	Season	Division	Apps	Goals	Apps	Goals	Apps	Goals	Apps	Goals
New York Cosmos	1971	NASL	24	6	0	0	0	0	24	6
Miami Gatos	1972	NASL	1	0	0	0	0	0	1	0
Career total			25	6	0	0	0	0	25	6
