= Ron Atanasio =

American soccer player

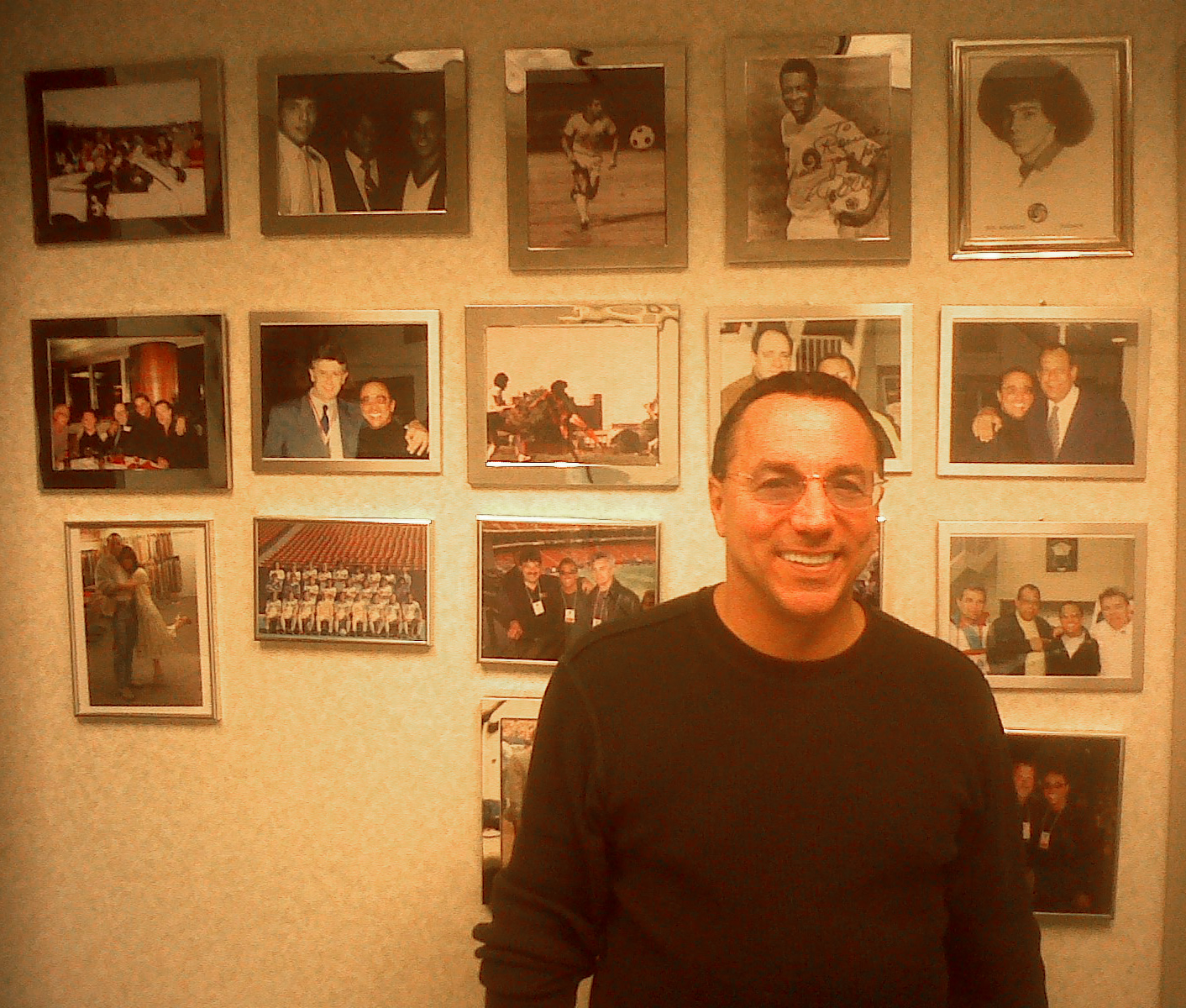

Personal information
- Date of birth: September 10, 1956 (age 70)
- Place of birth: Oceanside, New York, United States
- Position: Forward

College career
Years	Team	Apps	(Gls)
1974–1977	Adelphi Panthers		

Senior career*
Years	Team	Apps	(Gls)
1978–1979	New York Cosmos	8	(1)
1979–1980	Houston Summit (indoor)	6	(0)
1980	Houston Hurricane	2	(0)
1981	Detroit Express	24	(6)
1983–1984	New York Arrows (indoor)	10	(2)
1984	Charlotte Gold	?	(?)
1984	Fort Lauderdale Sun	?	(?)
Total		50	(9)
- * Club domestic league appearances and goals

Ron Atanasio is an American former professional soccer player who played as a forward.

== Early and personal life ==
Atanasio was born and grew up in Oceanside, New York, where he attended Oceanside High School.

== Career ==
Atanasio played in the North American Soccer League for the New York Cosmos and the Houston Hurricane; in the Major Indoor Soccer League for the Houston Summit and the New York Arrows; in the American Soccer League for the Detroit Express; and in the United Soccer League for the Charlotte Gold and the Fort Lauderdale Sun.
