= Emmanuel Kofie =

Ghanaian footballer (1943–2020)

Personal information
- Full name: Emmanuel Anui Kofie
- Date of birth: 10 February 1943
- Place of birth: Ghana
- Date of death: 2 May 2020 (aged 77)
- Place of death: New Jersey, United States
- Height: 5 ft 6 in (1.68 m)
- Position: Goalkeeper

Senior career*
Years	Team	Apps	(Gls)
- National Academicals
- Accra Great Olympics
- Asante Kotoko
1971–1972	New York Cosmos	11	(0)

International career
1966–1969	Ghana		
- * Club domestic league appearances and goals

Emmanuel Anui Kofie (10 February 1943 – 2 May 2020) was a Ghanaian soccer player who played in the NASL.

== Death ==
Kofie died in May 2020, after the effects of a stroke suffered years prior.

== Career statistics ==
=== Club ===
Club	Season	League			Cup		Other		Total	
Club	Season	Division	Apps	Goals	Apps	Goals	Apps	Goals	Apps	Goals
New York Cosmos	1971	NASL	11	0	0	0	0	0	11	0
Career total			11	0	0	0	0	0	11	0
