= Kurt Kuykendall =

American soccer player

Personal information
- Date of birth: October 30, 1952 (age 74)
- Place of birth: Chicago, Illinois, U.S.
- Position: Goalkeeper

Youth career
- 1970–1973: American Eagles

Senior career*
Years	Team	Apps	(Gls)
1974	Washington Diplomats	9	(0)
1975–1976	New York Cosmos	6	(0)
1977	California Sunshine	7	(0)
1978	Washington Diplomats (indoor)	2	(0)
1979	Rochester Lancers	1	(0)
- * Club domestic league appearances and goals

Kurt Kuykendall is an American retired soccer goalkeeper who played professionally in the North American Soccer League.

Kuykendall attended American University, where he was a 1973 Honorable Mention (third team) All-American soccer player. He was inducted into the American University Eagles Hall of Fame in 1996. In 1974, the Washington Diplomats selected Kuykendall in the first round (second overall) of the North American Soccer League draft. In 1975, he moved to the New York Cosmos for two seasons. In 1978 while working as a real estate broker he made an appearance in an indoor match for the Diplomats giving up 7 goals in two periods of relief for the injured Eric Martin. He finished his professional career with one game with the Rochester Lancers in 1979 as a replacement goalkeeper when the NASL players went on strike.

All five of his children – Kris, Shawn, Jason, Jaime and Samantha – play soccer.

For the Glory, a feature film based on Kurt's career, was released in 2012.
