= Keith Eddy =

English professional footballer (1944–2022)

Personal information
- Date of birth: 23 October 1944
- Place of birth: Barrow-in-Furness, England
- Date of death: 10 October 2022 (aged 77)
- Height: 5 ft 11 in (1.80 m)
- Position: Midfielder

Senior career*
Years	Team	Apps	(Gls)
1962–1966	Barrow	128	(5)
1966–1972	Watford	240	(26)
1972–1976	Sheffield United	114	(16)
1976–1977	New York Cosmos	30	(9)
Total		512	(56)

Managerial career
- 1979–1981: Toronto Blizzard
- * Club domestic league appearances and goals

Keith Eddy (23 October 1944 – 10 October 2022) was an English professional footballer who played as a midfielder for Barrow, Watford and Sheffield United in England, as well as the New York Cosmos in the United States. He went on to manage the Toronto Blizzard in the NASL from 1979 to 1981, and in retirement founded the Tulsa Soccer Club.

== Career ==
Born in Barrow-in-Furness, Lancashire, Eddy began playing football at the age of eight, and turned professional at 17. He made 482 appearances in the Football League for Barrow, Watford and Sheffield United. He was then signed by the New York Cosmos as part of a squad strengthening program following the arrival of Pelé; fellow British players to sign with the Cosmos at the same time included Tony Field, Dave Clements and Terry Garbett. Eddy spent two seasons with the Cosmos, making 30 appearances in the NASL, becoming captain of a team which included Pelé, Franz Beckenbauer and Giorgio Chinaglia. In 1977, he left the Cosmos but was first named as NASL all–star in 1976.

Eddy became head coach of the Toronto Blizzard during their first season under that name. They finished with a 14–16 record, reaching the playoffs but being knocked out by his former club, the Cosmos. He resigned in 1981, after the team fell to a 4–14 record placing them in bottom place in the North American Soccer League.

== Later life and death ==
Retiring from professional football, Eddy founded Tulsa Soccer Club, an organisation which promotes development in soccer in Oklahoma. Originally formed with four teams, it expanded and as of 2011, featured some thirty teams.

Eddy died on 10 October 2022, at the age of 77.
