= Siegfried Stritzl =

American soccer player (1944–2022)

Sigi Stritzl
Personal information
- Full name: Siegfried Stritzl
- Date of birth: April 12, 1944
- Place of birth: Yugoslavia
- Date of death: November 3, 2022 (aged 78)
- Height: 5 ft 6 in (1.68 m)
- Position: Midfielder

Senior career*
Years	Team	Apps	(Gls)
1961–1968	Blau-Weiss Gottschee		
1969	Baltimore Bays		
1970	Blau-Weiss Gottschee		
1971–1973	New York Cosmos	20	(3)

International career
1968–1973	United States	11	(2)
- * Club domestic league appearances and goals

Siegfried Stritzl (April 12, 1944 – November 3, 2022) was an American soccer player who was the 1969 North American Soccer League Rookie of the Year. He also earned eleven caps, scoring two goals, with the U.S. national team between 1968 and 1973.

The Sigi Stritzl Award, given to exceptional high school and college students, is named in his honor.

== Professional career ==
Stritzl was born in Yugoslavia. He spent six seasons with Blau-Weiss Gottschee of the German American Soccer League (GASL) between 1961 and 1968. In 1961, he was a member of the GASL Junior All Stars on a tour of Germany. In 1963, Blau Weiss-Gottschee won the GASL championship.

In 1969, the Baltimore Bays of the North American Soccer League (NASL) signed Stritzl. While the Bays finished the season with the league's worst record and folded at the end of the season, Stritzl was named the NASL Rookie of the Year. With the collapse of the Bays, Stritzl returned to the Blau Weiss-Gottschee for the 1970 GASL season. However, in 1971, the New York Cosmos of NASL signed Stritzl. He was named as a First Team NASL All Star that season as the Cosmos lost to the Atlanta Chiefs in the playoff semifinals. In 1972, Stritzl was a Second Team All Star, but this year the Cosmos won the league title, defeating the St. Louis Stars. In 1973, Stritzl played his last season in the NASL. Stritzl played forty-seven NASL regular-season and four post-season games. In 1971, he scored three goals in twenty-one games, several on free kicks where he bent the ball around defensive wall formations. Stritzl dubbed this technique his "banana kick".

== International career ==
Stritzl earned eleven caps with the U.S. national team. His first game with the national team came in a 4–0 loss to Israel on September 25, 1968. A month later, his second cap came in a world cup qualifying loss to Canada. Stritzl scored his first of two goals with the national team in the 4–2 loss. Stritzl continued to play for each U.S. national team games in 1968 and 1969. His second goal came in a 5–2 loss to Haiti on October 21, 1968. After the U.S. failed to qualify for the 1970 FIFA World Cup, Stritzl was not called into the national team again until a March 20, 1973 loss to Poland when he came on for Manfred Seissler. That was his last game with the national team.

== Personal life and death ==
Stritzl died on November 3, 2022, at the age of 78.
