= Tony Donlic =

American soccer player

Personal information
- Date of birth: March 24, 1956 (age 70)
- Place of birth: Vinkovci, PR Croatia, FPR Yugoslavia
- Position: Forward

Senior career*
Years	Team	Apps	(Gls)
1975–1978	New York Cosmos	3	(0)
1979	San Diego Sockers	2	(0)

International career
1977	United States	7	(0)
- * Club domestic league appearances and goals

Tony Donlic (Croatian: Đonlić; born March 24, 1956) is an American retired soccer forward who spent five season in the North American Soccer League (NASL). He also earned seven caps with the U.S. national team in 1977.

== Club career ==
Tony Donlic, a native of Croatia joined the New York Cosmos of the NASL in 1975. However, he did not see time with the first team until 1978. In 1979, he moved to the San Diego Sockers for a single season before leaving the NASL. After retiring from professional soccer he joined the amateur club NY Croatia of the Cosmopolitan Soccer League where he was instrumental in turning the team into a regional powerhouse.

== International career ==
In 1977, Donlic played seven games with the U.S. national team as a forward and midfielder. His first appearance came on September 15, 1977, in a 2–1 win over El Salvador in San Salvador. Over the next month, he played six more games, his last coming in a 2–1 win over China on October 16, 1977.

== Personal life ==
He owned a bar in Budapest for several years, but currently lives in Croatia near Split.
