= Ramón Mifflin =

Peruvian footballer (born 1947)

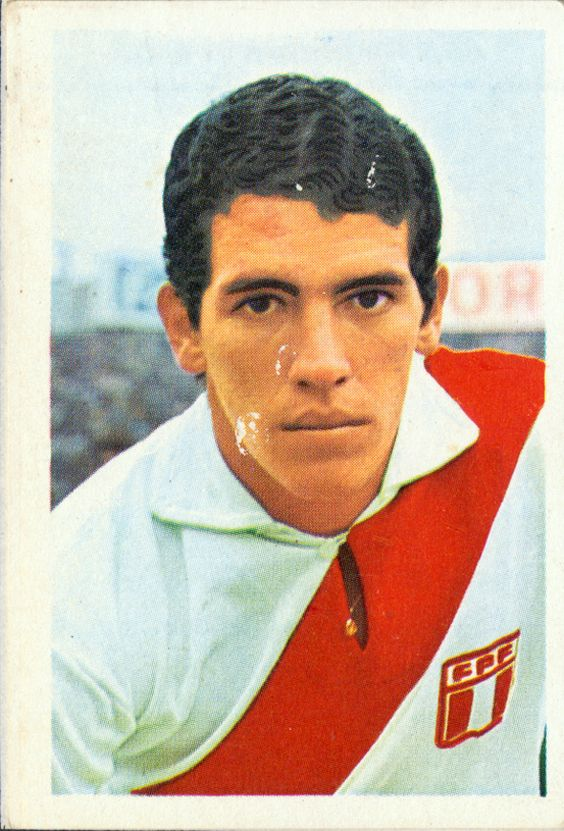
- Mifflin in 1970

Personal information
- Full name: Ramón Antonio Mifflin Páez
- Date of birth: 5 April 1947 (age 79)
- Place of birth: Lima, Lima Province, Peru
- Height: 1.72 m (5 ft 8 in)
- Position: Midfielder

Senior career*
Years	Team	Apps	(Gls)
1963–1964	Centro Iqueño		
1965	Defensor Arica		
1966–1973	Sporting Cristal		
1973–1974	Racing Club		
1974–1975	Santos		
1975–1977	New York Cosmos	38	(7)
1978	Los Angeles Aztecs	6	(0)
1978	New York Eagles	18	(0)
1980	Independiente Santa Fe	11	(0)
1981	Sporting Cristal		

International career
1966–1973	Peru	44	(1)
- * Club domestic league appearances and goals as of January 2009

Ramón Antonio Mifflin Páez (born 5 April 1947) is a former Peruvian football player.

== Career ==
He started his career in Centro Iqueño in 1963, by 1965 he played in Defensor Arica, and signed with Peruvian team Sporting Cristal in 1968 after being named player of the year. He then started in the 1970 FIFA World Cup for the Peru national football team with Héctor Chumpitaz, Teófilo Cubillas, Roberto Challe, and Hugo Sotil which were eliminated. After his play in the World Cup, he was signed by Racing Club of Argentina, and followed by Santos of Brazil where he became a close friend of Edson Arantes do Nascimento – Pelé. When Pele retired from Brazilian soccer, he signed for the New York Cosmos of the North American Soccer League (NASL). Pele recommended several players to come and join the NY Cosmos, among them, Carlos Alberto of Brazil and Ramon Mifflin from Peru. IN 1975, Mifflin signed with the Cosmos and remained with the team until 1977. In 1978, he played six games with the Los Angeles Aztecs. Later that year he played 18 games with the New York Eagles of the American Soccer League

Mifflin made 44 appearances for the Peru national football team from 1966 to 1973. Mifflin also played for Peru at the 1970 FIFA World Cup finals in Mexico.

== Retirement ==
Ramon Mifflin would then end up as an assistant coach for the 1982 World Cup Squad. His son Ramon also played pro soccer, and was a soccer coach in Calgary, Alberta with Calgary Blizzard Soccer Club and now currently coaches the men’s soccer team at the University of Calgary.

== Honours ==
Sporting Cristal

- Peruvian League
  - Winner (5): 1968, 1970, 1972, 1979, 1980
  - Runner-up (2): 1967, 1973

New York Cosmos

- North American Soccer League
  - Winner (1): 1977
