= Gordon Bradley =

American soccer player

Personal information
- Date of birth: 23 November 1933
- Place of birth: Sunderland, England
- Date of death: 29 April 2008 (aged 74)
- Place of death: Manassas, Virginia, United States
- Position: Midfielder

Youth career
- 1950–1952: Sunderland

Senior career*
Years	Team	Apps	(Gls)
1955–1956	Bradford Park Avenue	18	(1)
1957–1960	Carlisle United	130	(3)
1962–1964	Toronto Roma		
1962	Toronto Ukrainia		
1965	Toronto City		
1968	New York Generals	27	(0)
1969	Baltimore Bays	14	(0)
1971–1975	New York Cosmos	52	(0)

International career
1973	United States	1	(0)

Managerial career
- 1964–1965: New York Ukrainians
- 1967: New York Generals (assistant)
- 1969–1970: St. Bernard's School
- 1971–1975: New York Cosmos
- 1973: United States
- 1976–1977: New York Cosmos
- 1978–1980: Washington Diplomats
- 1985–2000: George Mason Patriots
- * Club domestic league appearances and goals

Gordon Bradley (23 November 1933 – 29 April 2008) was a soccer player who played as a midfielder. Born in England, he played for the United States national team. He is a member of the National Soccer Hall of Fame.

== Player ==
=== England ===
Bradley grew up in Sunderland, England where he turned professional with the local Sunderland club at age sixteen. However, his career nearly ended just as it was beginning. During a training session, he shattered his right kneecap kicking a ball and it took over two years before he was fit to play again. In 1950, English conscription laws forced Bradley to choose between working in the government coal mines or entering the military when he turned nineteen. Bradley chose to work in the coal mines at Easington Colliery. In addition to working in the mine, Bradley continued to play soccer. While he began his career as a forward with Sunderland, the injury slowed Bradley and he moved into defense. Bradley signed with Bradford Park Avenue in 1955 then in 1957, he moved to Carlisle United where he eventually played 130 games, scoring 3 goals.

=== Canada ===
Bradley spent five seasons in Canada playing in the Eastern Canada Professional Soccer League. In 1962, he helped Toronto Roma win the league title. After the conclusion of the 1962 ECPSL season he played in the National Soccer League with Toronto Ukrainia. After three seasons with Roma, he then moved to Toronto City for the 1965 season. In 1966, he played for Toronto Inter Roma.

=== United States ===
==== GASL ====
While playing in the summer in Canada in 1963 and 1964, Bradley would then move south during the fall and winter to play and coach the New York Ukrainians of the German American Soccer League (GASL) and won the 1964-1965 US Open Cup. In 1965, he moved to the New York Americans, a GASL team, which competed in the International Soccer League.

==== NPSL ====
In 1967, two new national soccer leagues, the National Professional Soccer League (NPSL) and the United Soccer Association (USA) formed in the United States. Bradley signed with the New York Generals of the NPSL. The two leagues merged at the end of the season to form the North American Soccer League (NASL).

==== NASL ====
Bradley remained with the Generals as they entered the NASL, serving as both player and assistant coach during the 1968 season. The Generals folded at the end of the season and Bradley moved to the Baltimore Bays for the 1969 NASL season. The Bays folded at the end of the 1969 season and Bradley was not associated with any NASL team for the 1970 season. He returned to the NASL in 1971 when the expansion New York Cosmos signed Bradley as both its first coach and first player. He both played and coached the Cosmos through the end of the 1975 season when he was fired after a 10–12 season and replaced by Ken Furphy. Having only played in one game in 1975, Bradley retired from playing professionally.

==== National team ====
Bradley earned one cap with the U.S. national team in a 2–0 loss to Israel on 15 November 1973. At the time, he was serving as the national team coach and ironically, he did not gain his U.S. citizenship until 1974.

== Coach ==
=== GASL ===
Bradley gained his start in coaching with the New York Ukrainians of the German-American Soccer League in 1963. He later served as an assistant coach with the New York Generals of the North American Soccer League in 1968.

=== School ===
When the Generals folded, Bradley coached the boys soccer team of Manhattan's St. Bernard's School.. His team went undefeated until the final game, which it lost, (1 - 0), to arch-rival, St. David's School.

=== NASL ===
In 1971, the New York Cosmos hired Bradley as the team's first coach. While he took the Cosmos to the 1972 NASL championship, he had two losing seasons in 1974 and 1975 and was fired at the end of the season and replaced by Ken Furphy. In 1976, the Cosmos fired Furphy after the team began the season 8-6 briefly. Bradley lasted until 7 July 1977 when the team moved him to the front office as Vice President of Player personnel during the season and replaced him as coach with Eddie Firmani. The Cosmos won the Soccer Bowl in 1977 (2–1 over the Seattle Sounders). In 1978, the Washington Diplomats hired Bradley as head coach. While the Washington Diplomats folded in 1980, they were replaced that by a new franchise with the same name which played in the American Soccer League. The new team retained Bradley as coach, but fired him during the preseason and replaced him with Ken Furphy.

=== National team ===
In October 1973, the United States Soccer Federation replaced Eugene Chyzowych as national team coach when he suggested the federation should hire a full-time coach. USSF called Bradley, who was on vacation, and asked him to coach the team. Bradley coached the U.S. to six straight losses and was dropped as head coach at the end of the year.

=== College ===
In 1985, George Mason University hired Bradley as its men's soccer team head coach. He coached the Patriots for sixteen years until retiring on 4 December 2000. During those sixteen seasons, Bradley compiled a 183-113-35 record. In May 2006, Bradley was inducted into the George Mason Hall of Fame.

== Soccer administration ==
In addition to playing and coaching the New York Cosmos, Bradley also served as the team's vice president from 1971 to 1977 when he left the team to join the Washington Diplomats. While coaching the Dips, he also served as the team's vice president.

== Television broadcaster ==
Bradley worked as a color analyst alongside Bob Carpenter on NASL games in 1983. He was also featured as a television commentator on Home Team Sports during local broadcasts of MLS' DC United games.

In 1996, the National Soccer Hall of Fame inducted Bradley. The next year, the Eastern New York Youth Soccer Hall of Fame also selected Bradley for induction.

== Death ==
He spent his last years out of the public eye, suffering from Alzheimer's disease and spending his last month in a full-care facility in Manassas, Virginia. Upon hearing of his declining health, one of D.C. United's supporter groups, Screaming Eagles, created a banner in Bradley's honor for display at the next home game. He died a few days later.
