= Werner Roth (soccer, born 1948) =

American soccer player (born 1948)

Personal information
- Date of birth: April 4, 1948 (age 78)
- Place of birth: Serbian Banat, Yugoslavia
- Height: 6 ft 1 in (1.85 m)
- Position: Defender

Senior career*
Years	Team	Apps	(Gls)
1966–1972	N.Y. German-Hungarians		
1972–1979	New York Cosmos	125	(2)

International career
1972–1975	United States	15	(0)
- * Club domestic league appearances and goals

Werner Roth (born April 4, 1948) is an American former professional soccer player who played as a defender. Mainly associated with the New York Cosmos, he also played for the United States national team for three years. He is a member of the National Soccer Hall of Fame.

== Soccer career ==
Roth was born in Ljubljana, and emigrated to the United States at age eight. He became a rising star in American soccer through the 1960s, attending Brooklyn Technical High School, playing on the varsity squad from 1962 to 1966, and captaining the team in his senior year.

Additionally, he studied architecture at the Pratt Institute, and played for the German-Hungarians in the German American Soccer League.

One of the few Americans on a star-studded New York Cosmos team (i.e. Pelé, Franz Beckenbauer) in the North American Soccer League (NASL), Roth played with the club seven years, was All-Star in 1975, 1977, and 1978, and helped it to Soccer Bowl titles in 1972, 1977 and 1978. He also appeared 15 times for United States men's national soccer team in the 1970s.

== Movie career and personal life ==
Roth played Germany national team captain Baumann in the 1981 movie Victory (titled Escape to Victory in Europe), which also featured former Cosmos teammate Pelé, as well as Sylvester Stallone and Michael Caine. He was inducted into the National Soccer Hall of Fame in 1989.

Roth lived in Brooklyn and Long Island for decades. In 2005, he became engaged to soap opera actress Robin Mattson. The couple were married in June 2006.

=== Films ===
Year	Title	Role	Notes
1978	Manny's Orphans	Himself	
1981	Escape to Victory	Baumann, Team Captain - The Germans	
