= New York Cosmos (1971–1985) =

American former soccer club

- Full name: New York Cosmos; Cosmos (1977–78)
- Nickname: The Cosmos
- Founded: December 10, 1970
- Dissolved: 1985
- Stadium: See Stadiums
- League: North American Soccer League; Major Indoor Soccer League
- Final season 1984: 3rd in Eastern Division
Home colors	Away colors

The New York Cosmos (simply the Cosmos in 1977–1978) was an American professional soccer club based in New York City and its suburbs. The team played home games in three stadiums around New York, including Yankee Stadium in the Bronx and Downing Stadium on Randalls Island, before moving to Giants Stadium in nearby East Rutherford, New Jersey in 1977, where the club remained for the rest of its history.

Founded in December 1970, the team competed in the North American Soccer League (NASL) until 1984 and was the strongest franchise in that league, both competitively and financially – based largely around its backing by Warner Communications President Steve Ross, which enabled it to sign internationally famous stars of the day such as the Brazilian forward Pelé, Italian striker Giorgio Chinaglia, the West German sweeper Franz Beckenbauer, and Brazilian rightback Carlos Alberto Torres. The acquisition of these foreign players, particularly Pelé, made the Cosmos into what journalist Gavin Newsham called "the most glamorous team in world football", and contributed to the development of soccer across the United States, a country where it had previously been largely ignored.

By the end of the 1980 season, the NASL was faltering, feeling the effects of over-expansion, the economic recession, and disputes with the players union. Attendances fell, the league's television deal was lost, and it finally folded in 1985 after playing its last season in 1984. The Cosmos attempted to continue operations in the Major Indoor Soccer League, but attendances were so low that the club withdrew without completing a season. The team attempted an independent schedule in 1985, but also canceled that because of low attendance, and the Cosmos folded. Former club employee Peppe Pinton assumed the trademarks and property of the club when it was dissolved, in part because nobody else thought they had any value at that point. Pinton put the trophies, uniforms, and equipment into storage and operated a New Jersey day camp for children under the name "Cosmos Soccer Camp".

Attempts were made to revive the Cosmos name during the 1990s and 2000s, most notably as a Major League Soccer (MLS) club. Pinton refused to sell the name and image rights, believing that MLS would not honor the club's heritage. Following the revival of several former NASL names in MLS, Pinton sold the rights for $2 million to an international, English-based consortium in August 2009. That group ultimately chose not to join MLS, and the new Cosmos team played parts of five seasons in second- and third-tier leagues before suspending operations.

In July 2025, it was announced that the Cosmos name and identity had been sold again, this time to a new expansion club that plans to begin playing in the third-tier USL League One at Hinchliffe Stadium in Paterson, New Jersey in 2026.

== History ==
=== Creation and naming ===
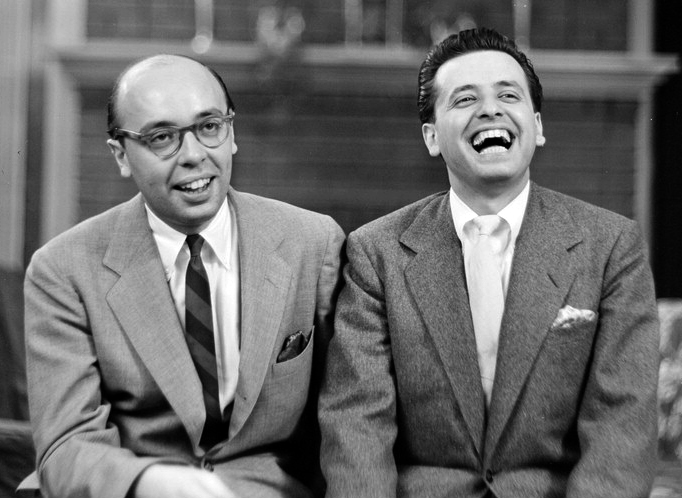
Atlantic Records founders, brothers, Ahmet (left) and Nesuhi Ertegun, were the primary co-founders of the Cosmos.

The club was founded in December 1970 by Ahmet and Nesuhi Ertegun, renowned executives at Atlantic Records, along with eight other executives from Atlantic's parent company Warner Communications, including CEO Steve Ross, president Jay Emmett, and Warner Bros. studio head Ted Ashley, each of whom put up one-tenth of the $350,000 NASL expansion fee. After several months of mounting financial losses, Emmett convinced Ross that the company should take on the financial burden. The ten investors sold the club to their employer Warner Communications for one dollar, and Ross threw the conglomerate's weight behind the Cosmos. Emmett later said of the move "(the Cosmos) was an entertainment vehicle, (Warner) was an entertainment company."

The team's first recruit was the Englishman Clive Toye, a former sportswriter who had moved to the United States in 1967 to become general manager of the short-lived Baltimore Bays; he was given the same post in New York. Toye sought to convey the new team's ambitions within its name, and reasoned that he could outdo the "Metropolitans" label referenced by the then-nine-year-old New York Mets baseball team by calling his team the "Cosmos", shortened from "Cosmopolitans". However, the owners preferred other possible names: the Erteguns wished to use the name originally suggested by Nesuhi, the "New York Blues"; and another part of the ownership group wanted to adopt the name "New York Lovers". Toye then staged a rigged "name the team" contest, receiving 3,000 entries and selecting one that just happened to match his pre-determined winner. Two NYC physical education teachers, Meyer Diller and Al Capelli, from Martin Van Buren High School in Queens, had arrived at Cosmos the same way Toye had, earning a trip to Europe as a prize. The team name was officially unveiled on February 4, 1971.

=== North American Soccer League ===
The North American Soccer League (NASL) was founded in 1968. The New York Cosmos entered the league in 1970, and made their field debut in the league's fourth season in 1971. The first roster signing of the club was Gordon Bradley, an English professional who had moved to North America in 1963 and played for the New York Generals in 1968. He was made player-coach, a position he would hold until 1975. Bradley's team finished second in its division in its first year, playing at Yankee Stadium, home of the New York Yankees baseball team and the New York Giants football team. Randy Horton, from Bermuda, was named the league's Rookie of the Year after scoring 16 goals and 37 points, the most by any New York player. In 1972, the team moved to Hofstra Stadium where they won their first league title with a 2–1 victory over the St. Louis Stars. Horton was the league's top scorer and Most Valuable Player, with 9 goals and 22 points from the 14 regular-season games and two post-season matches. The Cosmos reached the play-offs once more in 1973, but were knocked out at the semi-final stage. Bradley coached the United States national team for six games during 1973—picking himself in one, despite not being an American citizen—but lost them all. Before the 1974 season, the Cosmos moved again, settling at Downing Stadium on Randall's Island. In their first year at their new base, they finished bottom of their division. Horton top scored for the Cosmos in every season before he was traded in 1975 to the Washington Diplomats.

==== Arrival of Pelé, Giorgio Chinaglia and the Cosmos' peak ====
It was during the 1975 season that the Cosmos acquired the Brazilian star Pelé, whom they had been attempting to sign since the team was created. Ross had apparently not heard of him before getting involved in soccer, but agreed to finance the transfer when Toye compared the Brazilian's popularity to that of the Pope. Pelé joined the Cosmos on June 10, 1975, on a salary of $1.4 million per year, an enormous wage for an athlete at that time. A number of contracts—only one of which mentioned soccer—were set up for Pelé to ensure that he paid the lowest amount of tax possible, including one as a "recording artist" with Warner subsidiary Atlantic Records. "We owned him lock, stock and barrel," Toye retrospectively boasted. They also signed Mike Dillon in 1975.

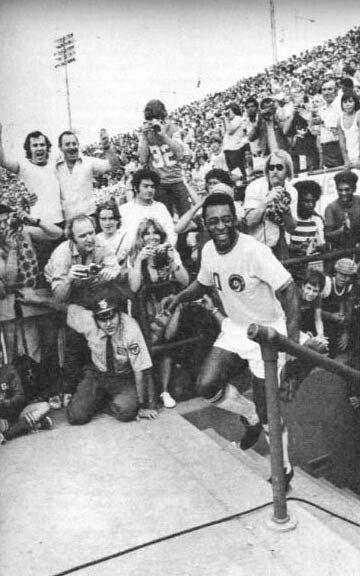
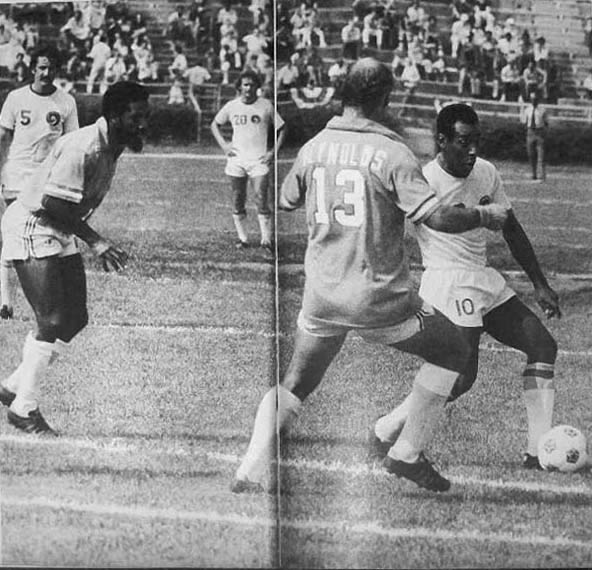
Two images of Pelé's official debut vs. Dallas Tornado on June 15, 1975: (left), entering to the field and (right) in action, marked by Richard Reynolds (#13)

The Pelé deal was later described by Gavin Newsham, an English writer, as "the transfer coup of the century". His arrival turned the Cosmos from a motley crew of foreigners, semi-professionals and students into a huge commercial presence. The club's groundsman, on hearing that the Brazilian's début for New York was to be broadcast on CBS, spray-painted the pitch green to disguise how little grass was on it: the match, against the Dallas Tornado, was broadcast to 22 countries and covered by more than 300 journalists from all over the world.

Although New York finished third at season end, it was still too low a placing to reach the post-season. Bradley was replaced for the 1976 season by another Englishman, Ken Furphy, who paired Pelé up front with Italian international forward Giorgio Chinaglia, a new arrival from S.S. Lazio. He had been so popular at Lazio that when his move to New York was announced, supporters "threatened to throw themselves beneath the wheels of the plane". By contrast to most of the overseas stars bought by NASL teams, Chinaglia was signed in his prime. He played for the Cosmos for the rest of their history, scoring a record number of goals and points not only for the Cosmos, but for the entire league. He shared an unusual personal bond with the club's ultimate controller, Ross, and was therefore treated differently from the other players, including Pelé.

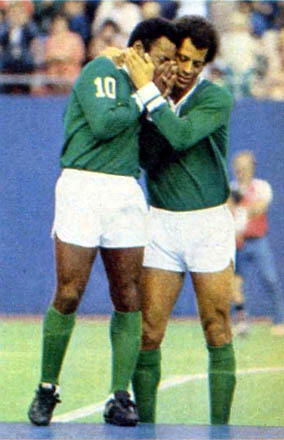
Pelé crying while teammate Carlos Alberto consoles him, at the end of his speech during Pelé's farewell match, October 1977

Crowds rose with the arrival of these and other European and South American international players, resulting in a move back to Yankee Stadium for the 1976 season. With numerous foreign stars arriving at the Cosmos, the team's competitive performance improved, as New York reached the play-offs at the end of the season, but lost in the divisional championship match to the Tampa Bay Rowdies. The Cosmos relocated again before the 1977 season, to the newly constructed Giants Stadium in New Jersey, and at the same time dropped the prefix "New York" and played simply as "the Cosmos", without a geographical name. The city name was restored in 1979.

Bradley returned as coach for the 1977 season in place of the dismissed Furphy, but was removed after half of the season to become the club's vice-president of player personnel. South African-born former Italy international Eddie Firmani took his place. Pelé played his last professional match on October 1, 1977, in front of a capacity crowd at Giants Stadium: in an exhibition match between New York and his former club Santos, Pelé appeared for both sides, playing one half for each. The Cosmos won the game 2–1. Pelé's compatriot, former Brazil captain Carlos Alberto was signed in 1977, at the same time as Franz Beckenbauer, who had captained the 1974 FIFA World Cup-winning West Germany national team. On the field, New York won three out of four championships, in 1977, 1978 and 1980. A playoff game against the Fort Lauderdale Strikers in 1977 drew a crowd of 77,691, a record for American club soccer. The team's average attendances, regularly over 40,000 during the late 1970s, were the biggest in the league; this helped it to become regarded as the league's "marquee club", both commercially and competitively. Firmani was fired in 1979; he claimed, after falling out with Chinaglia. His assistant, Ray Klivecka, replaced him, becoming the team's first American-born coach. He lasted a season before himself being replaced by Júlio Mazzei.

On Pelé's farewell tour in 1977, the Cosmos made history by becoming the first Western professional sports team to play in China. They drew their opening match with the Chinese national team 1-1, and lost the second game 2-1 despite Pelé scoring a free kick.

==== Decline of the Cosmos and the NASL ====
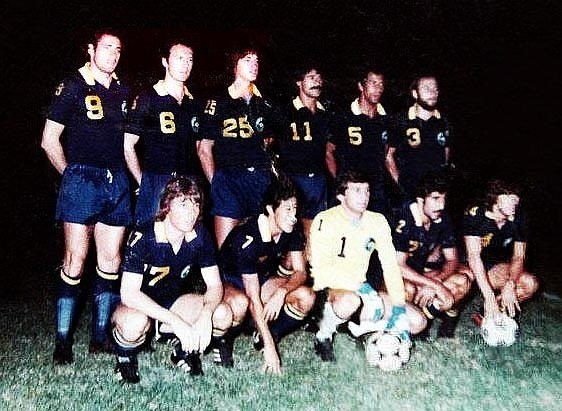
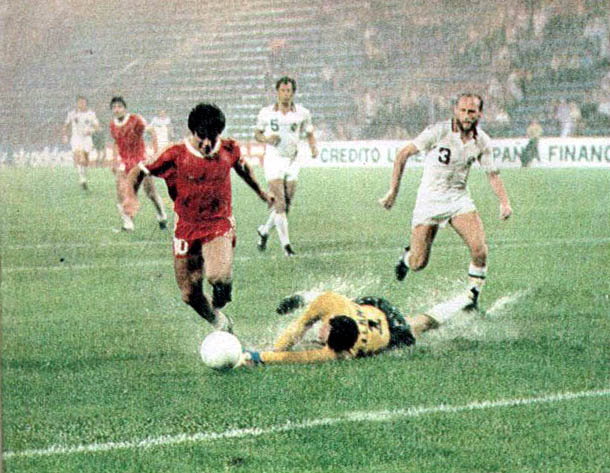
Two moments of the Cosmos during their tour to Argentina in March 1980: (left): starting lineup vs. Club Cipolletti; (right): playing Argentinos Juniors at José Amalfitani Stadium. On the image, Diego Maradona scoring for the local team

After the retirement of Pelé in 1977, much of the progress that American soccer had made during his stay was lost; there was no star at the same level to replace him as the NASL's headline act. While the deep pockets of Warner Communications had allowed the Cosmos to run at a loss, much of the league had become caught up in an unsustainable level of spending trying to keep up with them. After enduring briefly during the late 1970s, attendances dropped after 1980. The sport's popularity fell and the media lost interest. The deal with broadcaster ABC to broadcast NASL matches was also lost in 1980, and the 1981 Soccer Bowl was only shown on tape delay. All of the franchises quickly became unprofitable, and a salary cap enforced before the 1984 season only slightly delayed the inevitable. The league folded at the end of 1984, following the loss of most of its franchises.

The Cosmos had financial problems of their own, on top of those affecting the league in general. Much of the Cosmos' ability to attract the well-known overseas players it had acquired was due to the financial resources of parent company Warner Communications. At an annual shareholder meeting, Ross was asked what the Cosmos were costing Warner. He replied "About two cents a share," cleverly downplaying the loss of more than $5 million a year.

In the early 1980s, Warner was the target of a hostile takeover bid by Australian media magnate Rupert Murdoch; although this attempt did not succeed, Warner sold off several of its assets, among them Atari and Global Soccer, Inc., the subsidiary that operated the Cosmos. Chinaglia bought Global Soccer, and thus controlled the team. His group did not have the capital necessary to keep all of the players signed on expensive contracts by Warner, which resulted in many of the stars being sold. The club won its last title in 1982, and by the last season of the NASL, 1984, had missed the play-offs for the first time since 1975. The precipitous decline of the Cosmos after the 1983 season became for many fans and the media proof positive of the grave condition of the whole NASL.

=== Major Indoor Soccer League, demise and youth soccer ===
Following the collapse of the NASL, the team competed in the Major Indoor Soccer League during the 1984–85 season, with Klivecka briefly returning as coach, but withdrew after 33 games due to low attendance. The organization tried to operate as an independent team in 1985, but could not finish a single season and the club finally folded.

Former club employee Peppe Pinton, who started with the Cosmos as Giorgio Chinaglia's personal assistant and was promoted to General Manager when Chinaglia assumed control, ended up with the club's assets largely because he was the only one at the time who felt they had any value. Pinton put the trophies, uniforms, and equipment into storage and took over the club's day camp for children at Ramapo College in Mahwah, New Jersey changing the name from "Pele Soccer Camps" to "Cosmos Soccer Camp".

=== Revival attempts ===
Since the original New York Cosmos club's demise in 1985, there had been attempts to revive it. With the rise of Major League Soccer (MLS), various New York area entities—including two different ownership groups from the Metrostars/New York Red Bulls—lobbied Pinton for the acquisition of the Cosmos name. Pinton refused to sell to an MLS team, believing that the league would not acknowledge the Cosmos' legacy. However, when old NASL names such as the San Jose Earthquakes, Seattle Sounders, Portland Timbers and Vancouver Whitecaps were revived as MLS franchises, he reconsidered. He sold the Cosmos name and brand to English businessman Paul Kemsley in 2009, whose group announced a new team with the Cosmos' name in August 2010.

Kemsley put the original club's trophies on display in the new club's office in SoHo. He and the other owners initially intended to become an MLS expansion franchise, but ultimately turned down the invitation to apply. Kemsley's team instead joined the new second-tier incarnation of the North American Soccer League, starting play in its 2013 Fall season. It played for the next four seasons before the league folded. The Cosmos then joined the third-tier National Independent Soccer Association (NISA), but played only half a season before going on hiatus.

After the second club had been dormant for five years, the owner sold the name and logo to a new ownership group based in north New Jersey, which had already been announced as an expansion team in the third-tier USL League One. That expansion team was announced as the third incarnation of the Cosmos, with plans to begin play in 2026.

== Cultural impact and influence on American soccer ==
Sometimes, in the dressing room, I think I am in Hollywood.

— Franz Beckenbauer on the atmosphere surrounding the Cosmos

When Pelé arrived at the Cosmos in 1975, American soccer was, in Newsham's phrase, "dying a slow, painful and largely unnoticed death". The sport was not taken seriously by the bulk of the American media, and was of little interest to the public. Matches were often played in front of almost-empty stands, receiving modest press coverage. The signing of Pelé by the Cosmos transformed soccer across the country almost immediately, lending credibility not only to the Cosmos, but also to the NASL and soccer in general. Within days of the Brazilian's arrival, the increased media attention had caused the Cosmos' office staff to increase from five people to more than 50. Soccer briefly became to be seen as a viable alternative to more traditional "American" sports such as basketball, baseball and American football. The Cosmos, in particular, became an internationally famous club – "the most glamorous team in world football", in Newsham's words, or "soccer demigods" in those of ESPN writer David Hirshey.

We were as big as the Yankees and bigger than the Giants. We had our own tables at all the clubs. But we weren't any more decadent than players today.

— Shep Messing on the Cosmos' cultural stature

The Cosmos, as the flagship team of the NASL, embodied what Hirshey labeled the "nexus of soccer and showbiz", and became Warner Communications' most culturally visible asset. After Pelé signed for New York, many other European and South American stars joined NASL teams; the Los Angeles Aztecs, for example, signed George Best and Johan Cruyff in 1976 and 1979 respectively. Cosmos road trips, described by traveling secretary Steve Marshall as "like traveling with the Rolling Stones", saw the team pack each stadium it visited, while at home, the team attracted numerous high-profile supporters. While soccer had previously been largely ignored by the American press, the Cosmos and other NASL teams now became regular fixtures on the back pages.

However, just as Pelé had kick-started the development of soccer in the U.S., his retirement in 1977 would mark the start of a decline. With nobody of the same stature to personify the sport, the popularity that had been built up nosedived just as quickly as it had appeared. The league's television deal with ABC was lost at the end of 1980 and a salary cap, enforced before the 1984 season, caused many of the remaining overseas stars—lured to America by fat paychecks—to return to the European and South American leagues. The NASL collapsed abruptly in late 1984, and was not replaced by a new professional soccer league until Major League Soccer's first season in 1996.

A feature-length documentary about the Cosmos, called Once in a Lifetime: The Extraordinary Story of the New York Cosmos, was released in theaters in 2006. The film, narrated by Matt Dillon, featured interviews with many of the players and personalities involved with the team.

On several occasions since the team's folding, the Cosmos have been the inspiration for fashion lines. In 2010, the new owners of the trademarks partnered with Umbro to create a line of fashion clothing based on the Pelé-era Cosmos. This was followed in 2011 with a second "Blackout" line of Cosmos clothing, this time in all-black with monochromatic black logos, supposedly inspired by the New York City blackout of 1977. In February 2025, Admiral Sportswear announced it had partnered with the owners of the Cosmos brand to launch a new fashion line, based around the original club's Ralph Lauren-designed 1979 uniform.

== Uniforms and crest ==
For the team's initial uniform, Cosmos general manager Clive Toye chose the green and yellow of the Brazil national team as part of his strategy to lure Pelé, one of that country's star players, to the United States. The club's initial uniform was all green with yellow trim, with the colors reversed on the road uniform. Coincidentally, the colors were the same as those of the previous New York NASL team, the New York Generals, which had folded after the 1968 season.

When Pelé came on board in 1975, the uniform was changed to all-white, resembling those of his club in Brazil, Santos FC. The green and yellow elements were relegated to the trim. The green shirt was concurrently matched with white shorts to become the new away uniform.

For the post-Pelé era, the Cosmos intended to retire the green color with him and make the team colors navy blue, gold, and white. The club explained in its press release that green was being dropped in part because "(i)t had been felt for some time that green uniforms against the playing surface of the field presented visual problems for both the players and for television." The NASL determined that the Cosmos hadn't provided the required one year's notice of the color change, so the league forced them to play the 1978 season in white and green.

The Cosmos officially unveiled their new color scheme in 1979 with uniforms designed by New York native and fashion designer Ralph Lauren; the home uniform remained all-white, with navy and gold trim replacing the green trim of the previous outfit. The new away uniform featured navy shirts and shorts with yellow trim, paired with unusual yellow-and-navy hooped socks, which were later replaced with plain navy blue ones.

In 1981, the navy was lightened to royal blue, and the Cosmos kept that royal blue/gold/white color scheme through the last four years of the organization's existence.

Atlanta sports artist Wayland Moore was commissioned by Toye to design the team's logo. Moore had already worked on the logo, uniform and program covers of that city's soccer team, the Chiefs, and attempted to create a design that was simple, using colors representing the great outdoors of sports stadiums. The three colored "blades" surrounding the soccer ball in the center represent movement and reference the logo Atlantic Records founded by the managing partner Ertegun brothers. The logo font originally used was chosen simply because it was easily legible on the uniform. The text on the logo was shortened to "Cosmos" in 1977, concurrently with the team's dropping of the "New York" label. The city name was restored two years later, but the badge remained unchanged.

=== Uniform evolution ===
1971–72	1973–75	1975–78	1975–78 away	1979–85	1979–85 away

=== Uniform suppliers ===
Uniform suppliers used by the team:

Period	Kit supplier	Notes
1971	(United States) Denken Soccer LTD.	
1972	(United States) Denken Soccer LTD.	
1973	(United States) Denken Soccer LTD.	
1974	(United States) Denken Soccer LTD.	
1975	(United States) Denken Soccer LTD.	
1975	(United States) Champion	
1976	(United States) Champion	
1977	(United Kingdom) Umbro (Germany) Adidas (United Kingdom) Aertex (Brazil) Athleta	
1978	(United Kingdom) Umbro (Brazil) Athleta (United Kingdom) Admiral	
1979	(United Kingdom) Admiral	Designed by Ralph Lauren
1980	(Italy) Ellesse	
1981	(Italy) Ellesse	
1982	(Italy) Ellesse	
1983	(Italy) Ellesse	
1984	(Italy) Ellesse	
1984	(Italy) Ellesse (Germany) Adidas	
1985	(Italy) Ennerre	

=== Theme song ===
"The Cosmos Theme"

Single by The Cosmic Highlanders
- B-side: "The Cosmos Theme (Long Version)"
- Released: 1978
- Genre: Funk/Soul/Disco
- Length: 3:15
- Label: Atlantic Records
- Songwriters: Alan Gorrie, Steve Ferrone

Ahmet Ertegun used his connections to recruit Atlantic Records artists the Average White Band to create a theme song for the Cosmos. The resulting "The Cosmos Theme" was written by band members Alan Gorrie and Steve Ferrone, and recorded by the band under the pseudonym "The Cosmic Highlanders".

Team management originally wanted to use "We Are the Champions" by Queen as the club's theme, but were convinced by team cheerleaders to pick a theme they could dance to.

The Cosmos Theme was played extensively at Giants Stadium, and on television broadcasts of Cosmos games.

== Stadiums ==
The Cosmos' first home stadium was Yankee Stadium, home to both the New York Yankees baseball team and the New York Giants football team, where they played throughout the 1971 season. Attendances during the club's first year averaged at 4,517, less than 7% of the stadium's capacity, which was at that time 65,010. The Cosmos therefore moved before the 1972 season to the 15,000-seat Hofstra Stadium, on the campus of the namesake university 25 miles (40 km) east of metropolitan New York. After two seasons of continuing low crowds at this out-of-town location, the Cosmos moved again, relocating to the 22,500-capacity Downing Stadium before the 1974 season. It was at Downing Stadium that attendances started to rise significantly, buoyed by the arrival of stars such as Pelé, who arrived in 1975. For the Brazilian's first match, the stadium was full; "there must have been another 50,000 turned away", coach Gordon Bradley later claimed.

These larger attendances necessitated another move, which occurred in 1976, when the Cosmos returned to Yankee Stadium. This time the team averaged 18,227 fans over the course of the season, over four times the average 1971 gate. The team then moved yet again before the 1977 season, to the newly built Giants Stadium, where attendances skyrocketed; crowds peaked at an average of 47,856 during 1978. The Cosmos remained at Giants Stadium for the rest of their time in the NASL. Attendances gradually fell as the league declined during the early 1980s, then finally slumped in 1984, when they dropped by more than half from the 1983 seasonal average.

The largest crowd to attend a Cosmos home game was set in 1977, when the Fort Lauderdale Strikers visited for a playoff match. The game was attended by 77,691 fans, which, at the time, was a record for American soccer. The lowest average attendance for a season was 3,578, in 1974. As of 2011, only Hofstra Stadium remains, now renamed James M. Shuart Stadium. Downing Stadium, the original Yankee Stadium and Giants Stadium were demolished in 2002, 2008 and 2010 respectively.

While playing indoor soccer, the Cosmos' home arenas were the Brendan Byrne Arena (now the Meadowlands Arena) and Madison Square Garden.

Season	Average attendance	Stadium
1971	4,517	Yankee Stadium
1972	4,282	Hofstra Stadium
1973	5,782	Hofstra Stadium
1974	3,578	Downing Stadium
1975	10,450	Downing Stadium
1976	18,227	Yankee Stadium
1977	34,142	Giants Stadium
1978	47,856	Giants Stadium
1979	46,690	Giants Stadium
1980	42,754	Giants Stadium
1981	34,835	Giants Stadium
1982	28,479	Giants Stadium
1983	27,242	Giants Stadium
1984	12,817	Giants Stadium

== Supporters ==
The Cosmos sought to maximize their fanbase by appealing to as wide a demographic as possible. The club's name reflected New York's cosmopolitan makeup, and the logo purposefully avoided the standard American red, white and blue. In this the Cosmos succeeded, attracting noticeable support from local Europeans, Middle-Easterners and South Americans. The adoption of the team by members of the city's high society and association of it in both social and sporting contexts led to it becoming very popular among celebrities, both American and international. "We transcended everything, every culture, every socio-economic boundary," goalkeeper Shep Messing said in 2006. "We were international, we were European, we were cool, we were Americans from the Bronx. We were everything to everybody."

== Players ==
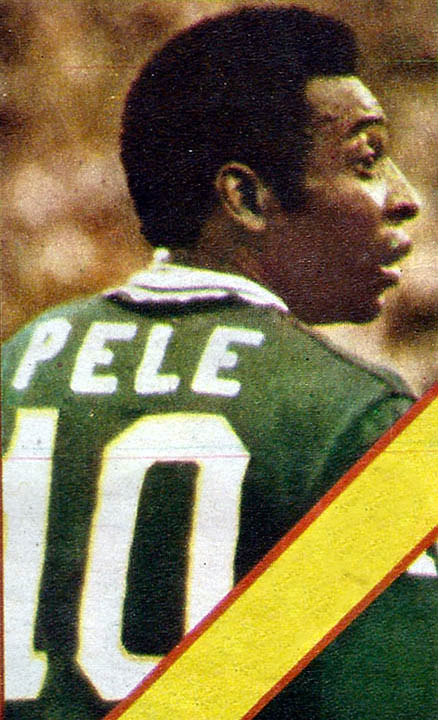
Pelé wearing the Cosmos' #10. The number was retired in his honor

The New York Cosmos are famous for having fielded numerous well-known players, almost all of whom were from outside the United States: examples include Pelé, Franz Beckenbauer, Giorgio Chinaglia, and Carlos Alberto. American players of note include goalkeeper Shep Messing – who was notoriously sold after posing nude for a magazine in December 1974, then brought back two years later on Pelé's insistence. The Cosmos also fielded Werner Roth, a Yugoslavian-born U.S. international defender, from 1972 to 1979. Three Cosmos players were named in the NASL all-star teams selected by the league at the end of each season. None was born in the United States or Canada, where all of the league's teams were based: like three-time All-Star Roth, two-time selection Siegfried Stritzl was born in Yugoslavia, and one-time pick John Kerr was born in Scotland.

=== Retired numbers ===
- 10 – (Brazil) Pelé (Forward, 1975–77)

== Club captains ==
Years	Name	Nation
1971	John Young	Scotland
1972–1975	Barry Mahy	England
1976–1977	Keith Eddy	England
1977–1979	Werner Roth	United States
1980–1983	Giorgio Chinaglia	Italy
1984	Vladislav Bogićević	Yugoslavia

== Head coaches ==
The New York Cosmos' first head coach was the English-American professional Gordon Bradley, who had played in the English Football League's lower divisions during the 1950s before moving to America in 1963. Bradley came out of retirement to become player-coach, a role he retained until his departure in 1975. Bradley's team won the league championship in 1972, but after it failed to reach the playoffs in both 1974 and 1975, he was dismissed. His replacement was another Englishman, Ken Furphy. His Cosmos succeeded in reaching the post-season, but lost the divisional championship game to Vancouver, prompting Furphy's own departure in favor of a return for Bradley, whose second spell lasted only half a season before he was promoted to an advisory role. Eddie Firmani, the South African-born former Italy forward, took over midway through the 1977 season. His star-studded team won two consecutive Soccer Bowls—1977 and 1978—but lost the National Conference championship game in 1979. Firmani lost his job after falling out with Giorgio Chinaglia, a favorite of the Cosmos hierarchy. His assistant, Ray Klivecka, who was born in Lithuania, became the team's first American head coach when he took Firmani's place midway through 1979.

Klivecka was replaced before the 1980 season by Brazilian coach Júlio Mazzei, who won the Cosmos' fourth title at the end of that campaign before being succeeded by two joint head coaches, Hennes Weisweiler & Yasin Özdenak, in 1980. This duo's team came second in the 1981 NASL before Mazzei returned in 1982 and won his second championship with the Cosmos during that year. Firmani returned in 1984, the NASL's final year, in which the Cosmos failed to make the playoffs. Firmani remained as the team entered the Major Indoor Soccer League for the 1984–85 season, but was fired in early December, halfway through the season, and replaced by Klivecka, who returned after two games under the caretaker management of goalkeeper Hubert Birkenmeier. Klivecka was retained until the team ceased competitive play.

Name	Country	From	To	Notes
Gordon Bradley	United States	1971	1975	Player-coach
Ken Furphy	England	1976	1976	
Gordon Bradley	United States	1976	1977	
Eddie Firmani	Italy	1977	1979	
Ray Klivecka	United States	1979	1979	
Júlio Mazzei	Brazil	1979	1980	
Hennes Weisweiler	West Germany	1980	1981	Joint with Özdenak
Yasin Özdenak	Turkey	1980	1981	Joint with Weisweiler
Júlio Mazzei	Brazil	1982	1983	
Eddie Firmani	Italy	1984	1984	
Hubert Birkenmeier	West Germany	1984	1984	Caretaker
Ray Klivecka	United States	1984	1985	

== Honors ==
With five championships and seven first-place finishes, the Cosmos still rank as tied for the most successful franchise in the history of North American soccer.

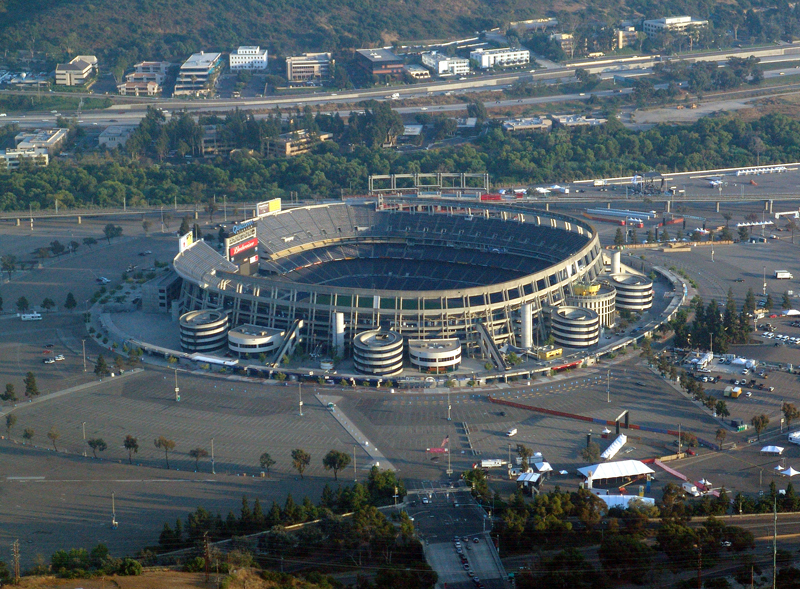
The Cosmos won the 1982 Soccer Bowl at the now-demolished Jack Murphy Stadium, pictured in 2005

Honor		Year(s)
North American Soccer League	Champions	1972, 1977, 1978, 1980, 1982
North American Soccer League	Runners-up	1981
North American Soccer League	Regular season titles	1972, 1978, 1979, 1980, 1981, 1982, 1983
North American Soccer League	Conference titles	1977, 1978, 1980, 1981, 1982
North American Soccer League	Divisional titles	1972, 1978, 1979, 1980, 1981, 1982, 1983
North American Soccer League Indoor	Runners-Up	1983–84
Trans-Atlantic Challenge Cup	Winners	1980, 1983, 1984
Trans-Atlantic Challenge Cup	Runners-up	1981, 1982

== Friendly matches and world tour ==
New York Cosmos had many friendly matches in domestic and abroad.

Event	Date	Venues	Rival	Res.	Score	Scorers	Ref.
Friendly	Sep 4, 1975	Råsunda fotbollsstadion	(Sweden) Stockholmsalliansen	L	2-3	STO: Jan Sjöström (3); NYC: Pelé (2)	
Friendly	Mar 11, 1977	National Stadium	Bermuda U-23	W	4–0	NYC: Chinaglia (4)	
Friendly	Mar 13, 1977	National Stadium	Bermuda	W	1–0	NYC: Chinaglia	
Friendly	Mar 19, 1977	?, Neuchatel	(Switzerland) Neuchatel Xamax	L	0–1	XAM: de Caster	
Friendly	Mar 20, 1977	Stadion Letzigrund, Zürich	(Switzerland) FC Zürich	L	1–3	FCZ: Botteron, Weller (2); NYC: Chinaglia	
Friendly	Mar 24, 1977	Olympic Stadium, Rome	(Italy) Lazio	W	2–1	NYC: Chinaglia, Hunt; LAZ: own goal	
"Tournament of Champions"	Apr 2, 1977	Giants Stadium, East Rutherford	(Haiti) Victory SC	W	9–0	NYC: Chinaglia (4), Pelé (2), Field, Garbett, Sono	
"Tournament of Champions"	Apr 3, 1977	Giants Stadium, East Rutherford	(United States) Tampa Bay Rowdies	W	2–1	NYC: Chinaglia, Dimitrijević; TAM: McLeod	
Friendly	May 29, 1977	Giants Stadium, East Rutherford	(Italy) A.S. Roma	L	0–3	ROM:	
Friendly	Jun , 1977	Giants Stadium, East Rutherford	(Italy) Lazio	L	2–3	NYC: Chinaglia, Rildo; LAZ: Garlaschelli, Agostinelli, Wilson	
Friendly	Sep 1, 1977	Queen's Park Oval, Port of Spain	Caribbean All-Stars	W	5–2	NYC: Chinaglia (2), Pelé, Topić, Dimitrijević; ALL: Llewellyn, Olmberg	
Friendly	Sep 24, 1977	Eden Gardens, Kolkata	(India) Mohun Bagan	D	2–2	NYC: C. Alberto, Chinaglia; MB: Thapa, Akbar	
Pelé testimonial match	Oct 1, 1977	Giants Stadium, East Rutherford	(Brazil) Santos	W	2–1	NYC: Pelé, Mifflin; SAN: Reynaldo	
Friendly	Jul 4, 1979	Giants Stadium, East Rutherford	(West Germany) Bayern Munich	L	0–2	FCB: n/a	
Asia and Australia Tour	Sep 20, 1979	Hong Kong Stadium, Hong Kong	(Hong Kong) Seiko SA	D	3–3	n/a	,
Asia and Australia Tour	Sep 24, 1979	?, Hong Kong	Hong Kong All-Stars	W	6–0	NYC:	
Asia and Australia Tour	Sep 28, 1979	Gudeok Stadium, Busan	South Korea	L	0–1	KOR: Park Sung-hwa	
Asia and Australia Tour	Sep 30, 1979	Dongdaemun Stadium, Seoul	South Korea	L	2–3	NYC: Chinaglia (2); KOR: Huh Jung-moo, Lee Jung-il, Park Sung-hwa	
Asia and Australia Tour	Oct 3, 1979	?, Jakarta	Indonesia	W	4–1	n/a	
Asia and Australia Tour	Oct 5, 1979	?, ?	Indonesia League XI	D	1–1	n/a	
Asia and Australia Tour	Oct 7, 1979	?, Singapore	Singapore	W	4–1	n/a	
Asia and Australia Tour	Oct 10, 1979	?, Kobe	Japan Soccer League XI	D	1–1	n/a	
Asia and Australia Tour	Oct 14, 1979	National Stadium, Tokyo	Japan	D	2–2	n/a	
Asia and Australia Tour	Oct 17, 1979	?, Kuala Lumpur	Malaysia	W	5–0	n/a	
Asia and Australia Tour	Oct 21, 1979	?, Melbourne	(Australia) Victoria League XI	W	3–2	n/a	
Asia and Australia Tour	Oct 24, 1979	Showground, Sydney	Australia	L	1–2	NYC: Chinaglia; AUS: Rooney, Henderson	
Asia and Australia Tour	Oct 31, 1979	?, Adelaide	(Australia) Adelaide City	L	2–0	n/a	
Friendly	May 21, 1980	Giants Stadium, East Rutherford	(United Kingdom) Manchester City	W	3–2	n/a	
Franz Beckenbauer testimonial match	Sep 24, 1980	Giants Stadium, East Rutherford	(United States) NASL XI	L	3–2	n/a	
Friendly	Jul 2, 1981	Giants Stadium, East Rutherford	Greece	W	2–0	n/a	
Australia Tour	Oct 17, 1982	Olympic Park Stadium, Melbourne	(Australia) Victoria League XI	W	3–2	NYC: Cannell, Neeskens, Chinaglia; VIC: Murphy, Brown	
South Korea and United States diplomatic relations 100th anniversary	Oct 28, 1982	Jeonju Stadium, Jeonju	South Korea	W	2–1	NYC: Neeskens, Bogićević; KOR: Kang Shin-woo	,,
South Korea and United States diplomatic relations 100th anniversary	Oct 30, 1982	Masan Stadium, Masan	South Korea	W	1–0	NYC: Chinaglia	

== See also ==
- Soccer in New York City

== Sources ==
- Club captains
- Brief history
- Pele and NY Cosmos – Guardian Newspaper
