= List of Seattle Sounders (1974–1983) seasons =

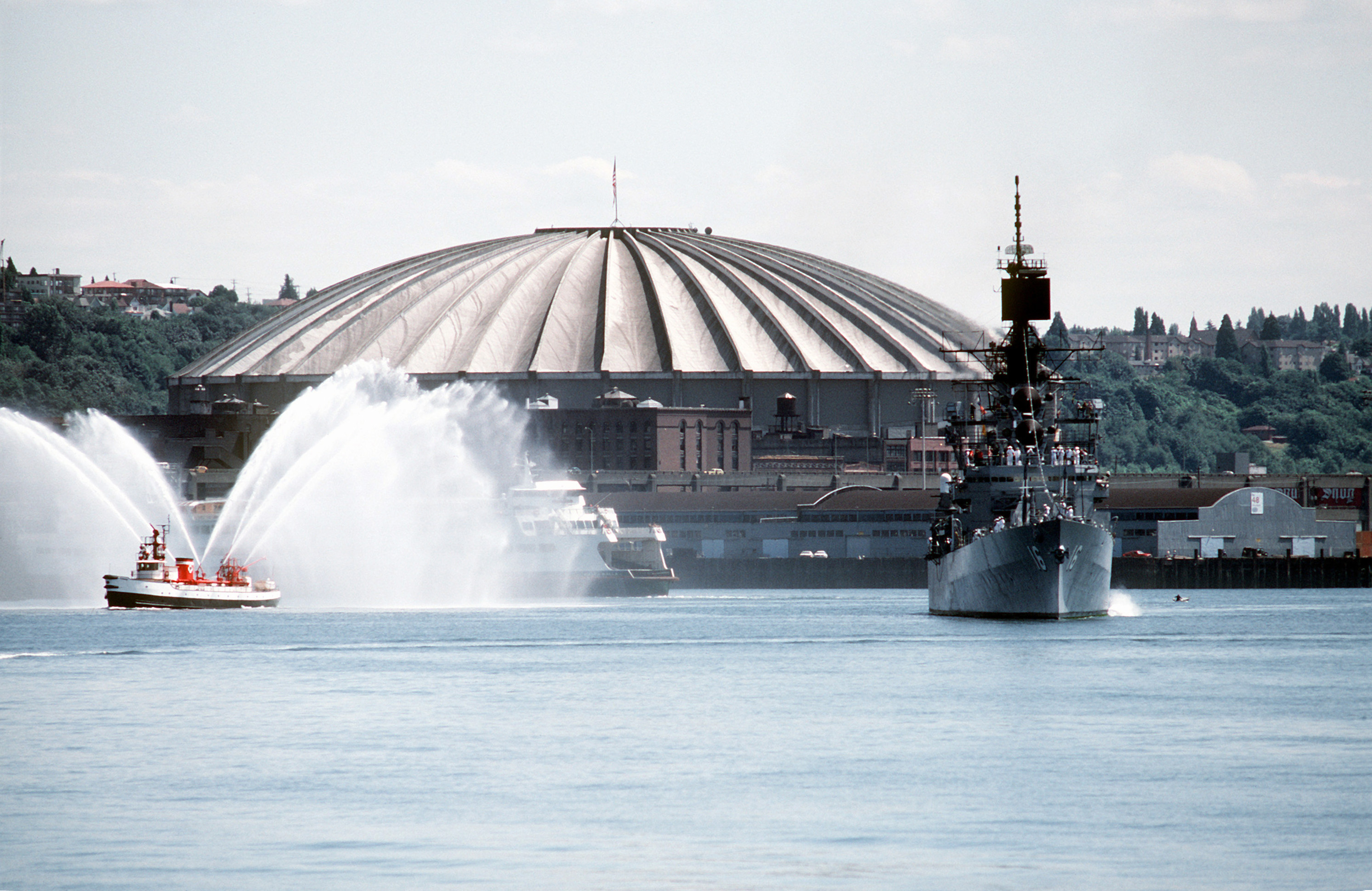
The Kingdome, where the Seattle Sounders played home games from 1976 to 1983

The Seattle Sounders were an American professional soccer team based in Seattle, Washington, that played in the North American Soccer League (NASL) for ten seasons from 1974 to 1983. They were the first of three professional soccer teams from Seattle to bear the "Sounders" name; the second incarnation played from 1994 to 2007 in several minor leagues, while the modern Seattle Sounders FC have been in the top-flight Major League Soccer (MLS) since 2009. The NASL franchise played home matches at Memorial Stadium for two seasons and moved to the new Kingdome, an indoor multipurpose stadium with 60,000 seats, when it opened in 1976.

The NASL's regular season typically began in April or May and ran until August or September with teams primarily playing against opponents from the same division or conference. The top teams in each division qualified for the playoffs, which were originally single-elimination matches but later changed to two-legged series and later a best-of-three system. The league's championship, the Soccer Bowl, was a single match hosted at a predetermined venue. The NASL also used a modified version of the Laws of the Game with rules similar to those used in other American sports despite opposition from FIFA, the global governing body of soccer. Among the changes were a countdown clock with pauses for stops in play, a relaxed version of the offside rule, and the removal of draws in 1975—teams would instead play 15 minutes of sudden death overtime and proceed to a penalty shootout if still tied. Under the modified points system, teams earned six points for a win, three for a tie (until 1975), one for a shootout win, and none for a shootout loss. Up to three additional points were awarded for goals scored in the match.

Seattle was among four West Coast cities which were awarded expansion teams in December 1973 to form the new Western Division. The 1974 NASL season saw the league expand to 15 teams, of which 8 were making their debut. The new team were named the "Sounders" in a public contest and played their first match on May 5, 1974, a week before the first win in franchise history—on May 12 against the Denver Dynamos at Memorial Stadium. After moving to the Kingdome in 1976, the Sounders drew an average of 23,000 or more spectators to their home matches for several seasons—more than that of baseball's Seattle Mariners and basketball's Seattle SuperSonics in the same venue. The Sounders were part of the Western Division (Note: The Western Division was renamed to the Pacific Division for the 1975 season before reverting to its original name.) during their ten seasons in the NASL; under the league's conference system, used from 1976 to 1980, Seattle was part of the Pacific Conference and later the National Conference. The Sounders also played in three of the NASL's indoor soccer seasons, which used six-a-side rosters during the winter offseason. The Kingdome was reconfigured to have a maximum seating capacity of 16,500 for the indoor seasons.

During their ten full NASL seasons, the Sounders played 278 total matches and had a record of 151 wins, 124 losses, and 3 draws. The team won their division twice and qualified for the playoffs seven times, but never won a league championship despite making two appearances in the Soccer Bowl. Seattle lost 2–1 to the New York Cosmos in Soccer Bowl '77, the final competitive match for Brazilian star Pelé. In a rematch at Soccer Bowl '82, the Sounders lost 1–0 to the Cosmos. The team finished the 1980 season with 25 wins—an NASL record—and won the 1981 Trans-Atlantic Challenge Cup, an exhibition tournament with invited European teams. Like other NASL teams, the Sounders did not participate in the U.S. Open Cup, the national cup competition of the United States. The Sounders folded after the 1983 season amid financial difficulties, including an estimated $7 million in losses, and disputes between the team's owners. The NASL itself ceased operations at the end of the next season in 1984 after several years of declining attendance and interest from financial partners. The "Sounders" name was next used by a minor-league team from 1994 to 2008 before it was adopted by a Seattle expansion team in Major League Soccer, the next top-flight soccer league in the United States, that debuted in the 2009 season.

== Key ==
Key to colors and symbols

1st or W	Winners
2nd or RU	Runners-up
3rd	Third place
Last	Last place

Key to cup record

- DNQ = Did not qualify
- GS = Group stage
- R1 = First round
- R2 = Second round
- QF = Quarterfinals
- SF = Semifinals
- RU = Runners-up
- W = Winners

== Outdoor seasons ==
Results of the Seattle Sounders by outdoor NASL season
Season	League												Position		Playoffs	Other		Average attendance	Top goalscorer(s) (Note: Top goalscorer(s) are determined by the number of points, with two awarded for goals and one for assists, in regular season matches.)	
Season	League	Conf (Note: NASL conferences were established for the 1976 season and abolished in 1981.)	Div	Pld	W	L	D (Note: Beginning in the 1975 season, all draws were decided in a 35-yard penalty shootout.)	GF	GA	GD	Pts	Pct	Finish	Overall	Playoffs	Competition	Result	Average attendance	Player(s)	Pts
1974	NASL	—	Western	20	10	7	3	37	17	+20	101	.575	3rd	5th	DNQ	—	—	13,454	John Rowlands	28
1975	NASL	—	Pacific	22	15	7	—	42	28	+14	129	.682	2nd	3rd	QF	—	—	16,826	John Rowlands	23
1976	NASL	Pacific	Western	24	14	10	—	40	31	+9	123	.583	2nd	8th	QF	—	—	23,828	Gordon Wallace	28
1977	NASL	Pacific	Western	26	14	12	—	43	34	+9	123	.538	3rd	8th	RU	—	—	24,228	Micky Cave	30
1978	NASL	National	Western	30	15	15	—	50	45	+5	138	.500	3rd	12th	R1	—	—	22,578	Micky Cave	32
1979	NASL	National	Western	30	13	17	—	58	52	+6	125	.433	3rd	17th	DNQ	—	—	18,997	John Ryan	32
1980	NASL	National	Western	32	25	7	—	74	31	+43	207	.781	1st	2nd	QF	—	—	24,246	Roger Davies	61
1981	NASL	—	Western	32	15	17	—	60	62	−2	137	.469	3rd	15th	R1	Trans-Atlantic Challenge Cup	W	18,224	Kevin Bond	36
1982	NASL	—	Western	32	18	14	—	72	48	+24	166	.563	1st	2nd	RU	—	—	12,539	Peter Ward	49
1983	NASL	—	Western	30	12	18	—	62	61	+1	119	.400	3rd	9th	R1	Trans-Atlantic Challenge Cup	3rd	8,317	Peter Ward	34
Total				278	151	124	3	538	409	+129	1,368	.549	W (2)	RU (2)	RU (2)	—	—	18,324	Mark Peterson	49 goals

== Indoor seasons ==
Results of the Seattle Sounders by indoor NASL season
Season	League										Position	Playoffs	Average attendance	Top goalscorer(s)	
Season	League	Div	Pld	W	L	GF	GA	GD	Pts	Pct	Position	Playoffs	Average attendance	Player(s)	Pts
1975	NASL	Region IV	2	0	2	8	23	–15	0	.000	4th	DNQ	— (Note: The Region IV matches during the 1975 indoor season were played in Daly City, California.)	Tjeerd van't Land	4
1980–81	NASL	Western	18	9	9	106	98	+8	0	.500	4th	DNQ	6,751	Jeff Bourne	60
1981–82	NASL	Northwest	18	9	9	95	97	–2	0	.500	3rd	QF	6,456	Alan Hudson	67
Total			38	18	20	209	218	–9	0	.474	—	—	6,604	—	—
