= 1977 North American Soccer League playoffs =

1977 North American Soccer League Playoffs
Tournament details
- Country: United States; Canada
- Teams: 12

Final positions
- Champions: Cosmos
- Runners-up: Seattle Sounders

Tournament statistics
- Matches played: 17
- Goals scored: 54 (3.18 per match)
- Top goal scorer(s): (Italy) Giorgio Chinaglia (9 goals)

The 1977 North American Soccer League playoffs began on August 10 and ended on August 28 with Soccer Bowl '77 at Civic Stadium in Portland, Oregon. 12 out of 18 teams qualified after a 26-match regular season, six from each conference.

== Playoff format ==
The top three teams in each division would quality for the playoffs, similar to the 1976 playoffs. The first round and the Soccer Bowl were single games, but the division championships and conference championships were two-game series. If teams were tied at one win apiece at the conclusion of Game 2, there would be a 30-minute sudden death mini-game and a shootout if necessary.

== Playoff seeds ==
=== Atlantic Conference ===
==== Eastern Division ====
1. Fort Lauderdale Strikers – Eastern Division champions, 161 points
2. Cosmos – 140 points
3. Tampa Bay Rowdies – 131 points

==== Northern Division ====
1. Toronto Metros-Croatia – Northern Division champions, 111 points
2. St. Louis Stars – 104 points
3. Rochester Lancers – 99 points

=== Pacific Conference ===
==== Southern Division ====
1. Dallas Tornado – Southern Division champions, 161 points
2. Los Angeles Aztecs – 147 points
3. San Jose Earthquakes – 119 points

==== Western Division ====
1. Minnesota Kicks – Western Division champions, 137 points
2. Vancouver Whitecaps – 124 points
3. Seattle Sounders – 119 points

== Bracket ==
First Round
Cosmos	3
Tampa Bay Rowdies	0
St. Louis Stars	0(2)
Rochester Lancers	1(4)
Los Angeles Aztecs	2
San Jose Earthquakes	1
Vancouver Whitecaps	0
Seattle Sounders	2

Division Championships
Fort Lauderdale Strikers	3	2(0)
Cosmos	8	3(3)
Toronto Metros-Croatia	0(2)	0
Rochester Lancers	1(3)	1
Dallas Tornado	1	1
Los Angeles Aztecs	3	5
Minnesota Kicks	1	0
Seattle Sounders	2	1

Conference Championships
Cosmos	2	4
Rochester Lancers	1	1
Los Angeles Aztecs	1	0
Seattle Sounders	3	1

Soccer Bowl '77
Cosmos	2
Seattle Sounders	1

== First round ==
=== Atlantic Conference ===
==== (E2) Cosmos vs. (E3) Tampa Bay Rowdies ====
August 10

Cosmos	3–0	Tampa Bay Rowdies
Pelé (58:16); Chinaglia; Pelé	Report

Giants Stadium, East Rutherford
Attendance: 57,828

==== (N2) St. Louis Stars vs. (N3) Rochester Lancers ====
August 10

St. Louis Stars	0–1(SO)	Rochester Lancers
Penalties
Burnett (penalty scored); Matteson (penalty scored); Evans (penalty missed); Binney (penalty missed)	2–4	(penalty missed) Silva; (penalty scored) Pollihan; (penalty scored) Reynolds; (penalty scored) Pedro; (penalty scored) Stojanovic

Francis Field, St. Louis
Attendance: 7,137

=== Pacific Conference ===
==== (S2) Los Angeles Aztecs vs. (S3) San Jose Earthquakes ====
August 10

Los Angeles Aztecs	2–1(OT)	San Jose Earthquakes
Best (85:06); Mihailovich 92:28'		Mitic (60:57)

Memorial Coliseum, Los Angeles
Attendance: 4,038

==== (W2) Vancouver Whitecaps vs. (W3) Seattle Sounders ====
August 10

Vancouver Whitecaps	0–2	Seattle Sounders
		Machin (18:17); Ord (83:34)

Empire Stadium, Vancouver
Attendance: 21,925

== Division Finals ==
=== Atlantic Conference ===
==== (E1) Fort Lauderdale Strikers vs. (E2) Cosmos ====
August 14
Game 1

Cosmos	8–3	Fort Lauderdale Strikers
Hunt (1:37); Beckenbauer; Chinaglia (16:19); Hunt (25:14); Field; Chinaglia (56:23); Chinaglia (62:29); Etherington (67:49)		Whittle (17:25); Piper (63:06); Whittle (68:17)

Giants Stadium, East Rutherford
Attendance: 77,691
August 17
Game 2

Fort Lauderdale Strikers	2–3(SO)	Cosmos
Irving (12:45); Whittle (62:15)		Pelé (61:09); Chinaglia (84:17)
Penalties
Piper (penalty missed); Nanchoff (penalty missed); Proctor (penalty missed)	0–3	(penalty scored) Hunt; (penalty scored) Sono; (penalty missed) Mifflin; (penalty scored) Garbett

Lockhart Stadium, Fort Lauderdale
Attendance: 14,152

Cosmos win series 2–0

==== (N1) Toronto Metros-Croatia vs. (N3) Rochester Lancers ====
August 13
Game 1

Rochester Lancers	1–0(SO) (3-2)	Toronto Metros-Croatia

Holleder Memorial Stadium, Rochester
Attendance: 10,556
August 16
Game 2

Toronto Metros-Croatia	0–1	Rochester Lancers
Bilecki (red card) 78:35'	report	Costa (red card) 19:32'; Fazlić (red card) 43:56'; Silva (78:35)

Varsity Stadium, Toronto
Attendance: 8,362
Referee: John Davies (England)

Rochester wins series 2–0

=== Pacific Conference ===
==== (S1) Dallas Tornado vs. (S2) Los Angeles Aztecs ====
August 14
Game 1

Los Angeles Aztecs	2–1	Dallas Tornado
Mihailovich (23:12); Cohen (77:05)		Pecher (43:24)

Memorial Coliseum, Los Angeles
Attendance: 5,295
August 17
Game 2

Dallas Tornado	1–5	Los Angeles Aztecs
O'Hare (72:13)		Cohen (40:30); Best (66:55); Rys (78:04); Backos (80:46); Cooke (81:33)

Ownby Stadium, Dallas
Attendance: 18,489

Los Angeles wins series 2–0

==== (W1) Minnesota Kicks vs. (W3) Seattle Sounders ====
August 14
Game 1

Minnesota Kicks	1–2(OT)	Seattle Sounders
Futcher		Ord (86:24); Butler 90:21'

Metropolitan Stadium, Minneapolis
Attendance: 35,889
August 17
Game 2

Seattle Sounders	1–0	Minnesota Kicks
Ord (58:28)

Kingdome, Seattle
Attendance: 42,091

Seattle wins series 2–0

== Conference Finals ==
=== Atlantic Conference ===
==== (E2) Cosmos vs. (N3) Rochester Lancers ====
August 21
Game 1

Rochester Lancers	1–2	Cosmos
Stojanovic		Chinaglia; Hunt (42:45)

Holleder Memorial Stadium, Rochester
Attendance: 20,005
August 24
Game 2

Cosmos	4–1	Rochester Lancers
Chinaglia (16:05); Chinaglia (22:59); Dimitrijević (47:33); Pelé (59:11)		Silva (53:41)

Giants Stadium, East Rutherford
Attendance: 73,669

Cosmos win series 2–0

=== Pacific Conference ===
==== (S2) Los Angeles Aztecs vs. (W3) Seattle Sounders ====
August 21
Game 1

Los Angeles Aztecs	1–3	Seattle Sounders
McAlinden (15:33)		Robertson (38:45); Buttle (62:47); Cave (66:23)

Memorial Coliseum, Los Angeles
Attendance: 9,115
August 25
Game 2

Seattle Sounders	1–0	Los Angeles Aztecs
Scott (13:29)

Kingdome, Seattle
Attendance: 56,256

Seattle wins series 2–0

== Soccer Bowl '77 ==
August 28
4 pm EDT

Cosmos	2–1	Seattle Sounders
Hunt (19:05); Chinaglia (77:19)		Ord (23:13)

Civic Stadium, Portland
Attendance: 35,548
Referee: Toros Kibritjan (USA)
