= 1977 New York Cosmos season =

Cosmos
1977 season
- Manager: Gordon Bradley (Until July 7); Eddie Firmani (After July 7)
- Stadium: Giants Stadium
- NASL: Division: 2nd Overall: 3rd Playoffs: Champions
- National Challenge Cup: Did not enter
- Top goalscorer: League: Giorgio Chinaglia (15 goals); All: Giorgio Chinaglia (42+ goals)
- Highest home attendance: 77,691 vs. Fort Lauderdale (August 14)
- Lowest home attendance: 7,212 vs. Victory Sportif Club (April 2)
- Average home league attendance: 34,142
Home colors	Away colors

The 1977 New York Cosmos season was the seventh season for the New York Cosmos in the now-defunct North American Soccer League. The Cosmos' seventh year of existence saw them drop "New York" from the club name (it would be restored in 1979), move into Giants Stadium (where they would play until their dissolution in 1985), and win their second NASL championship in Pelé's final year as a professional footballer. Pelé's last match was on October 1, 1977, in front of a capacity crowd at Giants Stadium: in an exhibition match between New York and his former club Santos, Pelé appeared for both sides, playing one half for each. The Cosmos won the game 2–1. The Cosmos finished second in the 4-team Eastern Division and third out of 18 teams league-wide on their way to the 1977 championship.

== Squad ==
Note: Flags indicate national team as defined under FIFA eligibility rules; some limited exceptions apply. Players may hold more than one non-FIFA nationality.

No.	Pos.	Nation	Player
1	GK	USA	Shep Messing
2	DF	CAN	Robert Iarusci
2	DF	CAN	Bruce Twamley
3	MF	YUG	Vito Dimitrijević
4	DF	USA	Werner Roth
5	DF	ENG	Keith Eddy
6	DF	GER	Franz Beckenbauer
7	FW	ENG	Tony Field
8	MF	ENG	Terry Garbett
9	FW	ITA	Giorgio Chinaglia
10	FW	BRA	Pelé
11	FW	ENG	Steve Hunt
12	DF	USA	Bobby Smith
14	MF	BRA	Nelsi Morais

No.	Pos.	Nation	Player
15	MF	PER	Ramon Mifflin
16	FW	USA	Tony Donlic
17	DF	SCO	Charlie Aitken
18	FW	YUG	Jadranko Topić
19	GK	TUR	Erol Yasin
20	DF	ENG	Mike Dillon
21	FW	USA	Gary Etherington
22	FW	RSA	Jomo Sono
23	DF	BRA	Rildo
25	DF	BRA	Carlos Alberto
26	DF	CAN	Paul Hunter
28	MF	USA	Tommy Lang
33	MF	USA	Chris Agoliati
34	FW	USA	Roberto de Oliveira

== Results ==
=== Preseason ===
Date	Opponent	Venue	Result	Attendance	Scorers
March 11, 1977	Bermuda U23	A	0–4	626	Chinaglia (4)
March 13, 1977	Bermuda	A	0–1	3,769	Chinaglia
March 19, 1977	(Switzerland) Xamax	A	1–0	3,000	
March 20, 1977	(Switzerland) Zürich	A	3–1	7,000	Chinaglia
March 24, 1977	(Italy) Lazio	A	1–2	20,000	Chinaglia, N/A
April 2, 1977	(Haiti) Victory	H	9–0	7,212	Chinaglia (5), Field, Garbett, Pelé (2)
April 3, 1977	(United States) Tampa Bay Rowdies	H	2–1	11,098	Chinaglia, Dimitrijevic

=== Regular season ===
Pld = Games Played, W = Wins, L = Losses, GF = Goals For, GA = Goals Against, Pts = Points
6 points for a win, 1 point for a shootout win, 0 points for a loss, 1 point for each goal scored (up to three per game).

==== Eastern Division Standings ====
Pos	Club	Pld	W	L	GF	GA	GD	Pts
1	Fort Lauderdale Strikers	26	19	7	49	29	+20	161
2	Cosmos	26	15	11	60	39	+21	140
3	Tampa Bay Rowdies	26	14	12	55	45	+10	131
4	Washington Diplomats	26	10	16	32	49	-17	92

==== Overall League Placing ====
Pos	Club	Pld	W	L	GF	GA	GD	Pts
1	Fort Lauderdale Strikers	26	19	7	49	29	+20	161
2	Dallas Tornado	26	18	8	56	37	+19	161
3	Cosmos	26	15	11	60	39	+21	140
4	Minnesota Kicks	26	16	10	44	36	+8	137
5	Tampa Bay Rowdies	26	14	12	55	45	+10	131

==== Matches ====
Date	Opponent	Venue	Result	Attendance	Scorers
April 9, 1977	Las Vegas Quicksilvers	A	1–0	11,896	
April 13, 1977	Team Hawaii	A	1–2	12,877	Topic, Hunt
April 17, 1977	Rochester Lancers	H	2–0	26,752	Chinaglia, Pelé
April 24, 1977	Dallas Tornado	H	1–1 (SOL)	13,527	Smith
May 1, 1977	St. Louis Stars	H	2–2 (SOL)	20,112	Dillon, Morais
May 8, 1977	Connecticut Bicentennials	A	2–3	17,302	Chinaglia, Eddy, Dimitrijevic
May 11, 1977	Chicago Sting	A	1–2	21,108	OG, Dimitrijevic
May 15, 1977	Fort Lauderdale Strikers	H	3–0	21,782	Pelé (3)
May 22, 1977	Chicago Sting	H	1–2	20,407	Chinaglia
May 29, 1977	Tampa Bay Rowdies	A	4–2	45,288	Beckenbauer, Field
June 5, 1977	Toronto Metros-Croatia	H	6–0	31,208	Sono, Chinaglia (2), Hunt (3)
June 8, 1977	Fort Lauderdale Strikers	A	0–3	14,358	Beckenbauer, Pelé, Chinaglia
June 12, 1977	Minnesota Kicks	H	1–1 (SOW)	36,816	Chinaglia
June 16, 1977	Toronto Metros-Croatia	A	1–2	21,793	Field, Chinaglia
June 19, 1977	Tampa Bay Rowdies	H	3–1	62,394	Pelé (3)
June 23, 1977	St. Louis Stars	A	2–0	32,605	
June 26, 1977	Los Angeles Aztecs	H	5–2	57,191	Pelé (3), Mifflin, Dimitrijevic
June 30, 1977	Vancouver Whitecaps	A	5–3	30,277	Roth, Chinaglia, Field
July 2, 1977	Los Angeles Aztecs	A	4–1	32,165	Chinaglia
July 6, 1977	San Jose Earthquakes	H	3–0	31,875	Hunt, Dimitrijevic, Field
July 10, 1977	Seattle Sounders	H	1–0	41,270	
July 15, 1977	Rochester Lancers	A	0–0 (SOL)	17,572	
July 17, 1977	Portland Timbers	H	2–0	41,205	Hunt, Chinaglia
July 27, 1977	Washington Diplomats	H	8–2	34,189	Beckenbauer (2), Chinaglia (3), Hunt (2), Field
July 31, 1977	Connecticut Bicentennials	H	3–1	46,389	Chinaglia, Pelé, Field
August 6, 1977	Washington Diplomats	A	2–1	31,283	Pelé

=== Postseason ===
==== First round ====
August 10	San Jose Earthquakes	1–2	Los Angeles Aztecs	Los Angeles, Memorial Coliseum

August 10	Tampa Bay Rowdies	0–3	Cosmos	New York City, Yankee Stadium

August 10	Rochester Lancers	1–0	St. Louis Stars	St. Louis, Busch Memorial

August 10	Seattle Sounders	2–0	Vancouver Whitecaps	Burnaby (BC), Swangard Stadium

==== Conference semifinals ====
			Game 1	Game 2
Cosmos	–	Ft. Lauderdale Strikers	8–3	3–2	August 14, 17
Los Angeles Aztecs	–	Dallas Tornado	3–1	5–1	August 14, 17 1977
Minnesota Kicks	–	Seattle Sounders	1–2	0–1	August 14, 17
Rochester Lancers	–	Toronto Metros-Croatia	1–0	1–0	August 14, 17

==== Conference Championships ====
			Game 1	Game 2
Los Angeles Aztecs	—	Seattle Sounders	1—3	0—1	August 21, 25
Rochester Lancers	—	Cosmos	1—2	1—4	August 21, 24

==== Soccer Bowl '77 ====
August 28	Cosmos	2–1	Seattle Sounders	Portland (OR), Civic Stadium

==== Matches ====
Date	Opponent	Venue	Result	Attendance	Scorers
August 10, 1977	Tampa Bay Rowdies	H	3–0	57,828	Pelé (2), Chinaglia
August 14, 1977	Fort Lauderdale Strikers	H	8–3	77,691	Chinaglia (3), Hunt (2), Etherington, Beckenbauer, Field
August 17, 1977	Fort Lauderdale Strikers	A	2–2 (SOW)	14,152	Pelé, Chinaglia
August 21, 1977	Rochester Lancers	A	1–2	20,005	Hunt, Chinaglia
August 24, 1977	Rochester Lancers	H	4–1	73,669	Chinaglia (2), Pelé, Dimitrijevic
August 28, 1977	Seattle Sounders	N	2–1	35,548	Hunt, Chinaglia

=== Friendlies ===
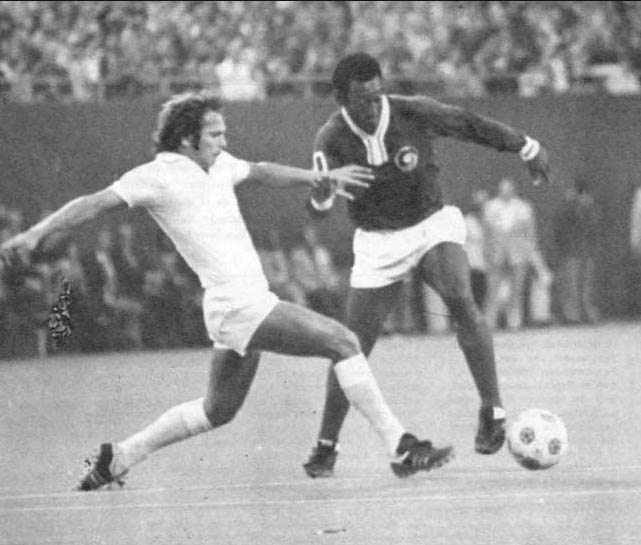
Pelé's farewell at Giants Stadium, Cosmos 2 v Santos FC 1

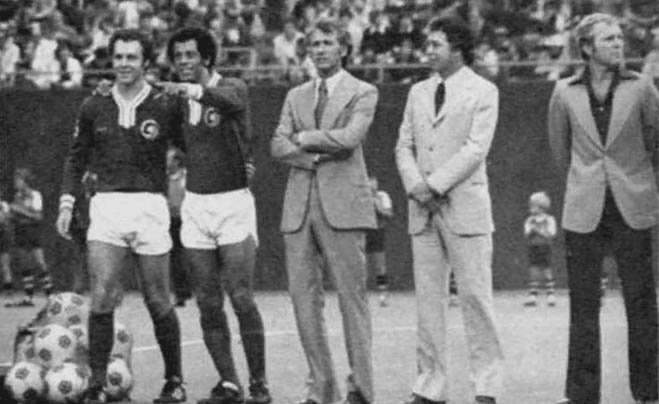
Fltr: Franz Beckenbauer, Carlos Alberto, Bellini, Mauro, Bobby Moore, the captains of World Cup champion squads during Pelé's farewell

Date	Opponent	Venue	Result	Att.	Scorers
March 11	Bermuda U23	A	4–0	626	Chiaglia (4)
March 13	Bermuda	A	1–0	3,769	Chiaglia
March 19	(Switzerland) Neuchâtel	A	0–1	3,000	–
March 20	(Switzerland) FC Zürich	A	1–3	7,000	Chinaglia
March 24	(Italy) Lazio	A	2–1	15,000	Chinaglia, Hunt
April 2	(Haiti) Victory	A	9–0	15,000	Chinaglia (4), Pelé, Field, Garbett, Sono
April 3	(United States) Tampa Bay Rowdies	A	2–1	11,098	Chinaglia, Dimitrijevic
June 1	(Italy) Lazio	H	3–2	25,803	Chinaglia, Rildo, Wilson
September 1	(Caribbean Community) Caribbean All-Stars	A	5–2	30,000	Dimitrijevic, Chinaglia, Topic, Pelé
September 4	(Venezuela) Portuguesa	A	1–1	15,000	Smith
September 10	(Japan) Furukawa	A	4–2	30,000	Chinaglia, Field, Pelé
September 14	Japan	A	3–1	65,000	Topic, Morais, Chinaglia
September 17	China	A	1–1	80,000	Field
September 20	China	A	1–2	50,000	Pelé
September 25	(India) Mohun Bagan	A	2–2	65,000	Carlos Alberto, Chinaglia
October 1	(Brazil) Santos (Note: Pelé's farewell game. After his #10 was retired by the franchise at halftime, Pelé played the second half for Santos.)	H	2–1	75,646	Mifflin, Pelé
October 5	(Brazil) Santos	N (Note: Held in Detroit.)	1–1	24,689	Chinaglia
October 8	China	H	1–1	33,712	Chinaglia
October 14	(Brazil) Flamengo	A	1–4	14,000	Field

== See also ==
- 1977 North American Soccer League season
