= Soccer Bowl '77 =

Soccer match

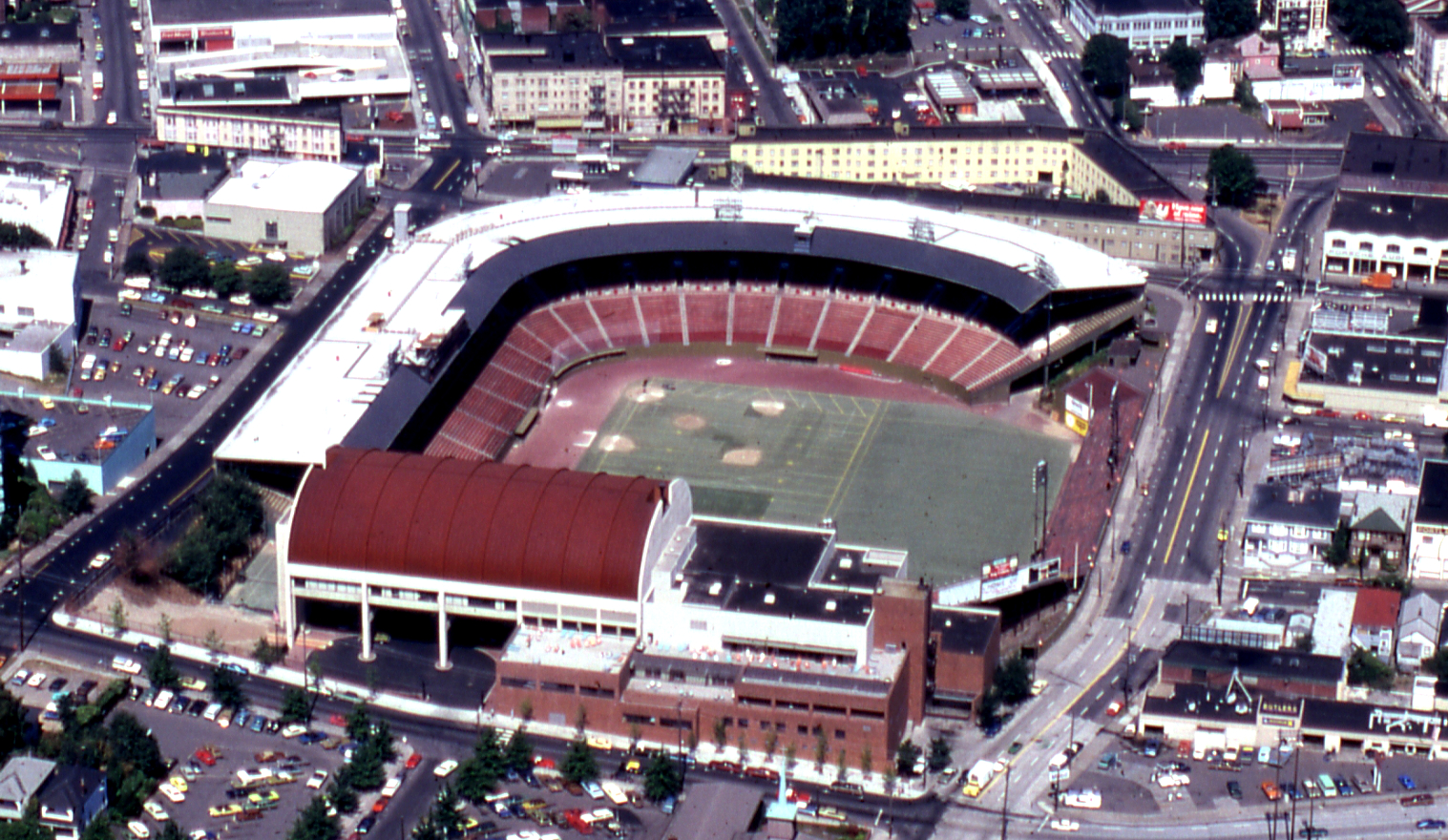
- Civic Stadium was the venue for Soccer Bowl '77
- Event: Soccer Bowl
| New York Cosmos | Seattle Sounders |
| 2 | 1 |
- Date: August 28, 1977
- Venue: Civic Stadium, Portland, Oregon
- Man of the Match: Stephen Hunt
- Referee: Toros Kibritjan (United States)
- Attendance: 35,548

Soccer Bowl '77 was the championship final of the 1977 NASL season. The New York Cosmos (who had dropped "New York" from their name in the off-season to simply "Cosmos") took on the Seattle Sounders. The match was played on August 28, 1977 at Civic Stadium, in Portland, Oregon. The game was also noteworthy as the final competitive match for Pelé, the Brazilian star widely acknowledged as the sport's greatest player. The Cosmos won the match, 2–1, to claim their second North American championship. The match was broadcast on TVS.

== Venue ==
Civic Stadium (now called Providence Park) in Portland, Oregon, was selected as the host of Soccer Bowl '77 by the NASL on October 15, 1976. It was initially scheduled for August 27, but was moved a day later.

== Road to the final ==
=== New York Cosmos ===
The Cosmos qualified for the playoffs by virtue of a second-place finish in the Eastern Division of the Atlantic Conference with 140 points. The Cosmos defeated the Tampa Bay Rowdies in a first round single-match, 3–0, on August 10, 1977, before a home crowd of 57,828 fans. They then faced the Eastern Division winner and number one seed, Ft. Lauderdale Strikers in a best-of three-series. The first game of the series was witnessed by an all-time record NASL crowd of 77,691 and saw the Cosmos win convincingly, 8–3, on August 14, 1977. The second leg, played in Fort Lauderdale on August 17, 1977, finished regulation as a 2–2 draw. After 15 minutes of scoreless golden goal extra time the teams moved on to an NASL shoot-out, which the Cosmos won, 3–0. The win advanced them to the Conference finals. In the Atlantic Conference finals series the Cosmos went up against the upset-minded Rochester Lancers, who had already dispatched two higher seeded opponents. Game 1 of the series was played on August 21, 1977 in Rochester, and saw the Cosmos win a close-fought contest, 2–1. The second leg was played before another large Meadowlands crowd of 73,669 on August 24, 1977. In that game, as with the two previous home playoff games, the Cosmos proved to be a decisive winner, 4–1. By winning the series two games to none, the Cosmos won the Atlantic Conference title and advanced to the Soccer Bowl.

=== Seattle Sounders ===
The Seattle Sounders qualified for the playoffs by virtue of a third-place finish in the Western Division of the Pacific Conference with 123 points. The Sounders defeated the Vancouver Whitecaps in a first round single-match, 2–0, on August 10, 1977. They then faced the Western Division winner, Minnesota Kicks in a best-of three-series. The first game of the series, which was played on August 14, 1977, saw the Sounders edge ahead, 2–1, on a sudden death goal in overtime. In the second leg, the Sounders hung on for a 1–0 win on August 17, 1977. The two victories advanced them to the conference finals. In the Pacific Conference finals series, the Sounders went up against the Los Angeles Aztecs, who themselves had just upset Dallas, the number one seed in the conference. Game 1 of the series was played on August 21, 1977 in Los Angeles, and the Sounders won, 3–1. The second leg was played before an impressive Kingdome crowd of 56,256 on August 25, 1977. In that game, the Sounders gutted out a 1–0 result. In doing so, they won the series two games to none, and the Pacific Conference title to advance to the Soccer Bowl.

== Match details ==
August 28
12:00 p.m. (PDT)

| New York Cosmos (Note: The team had shortened its name from "New York Cosmos" to "Cosmos" at the beginning of the season. It lasted until 1979.) | 2–1 | Seattle Sounders |
|---|---|---|
| Hunt 20'; Chinaglia 78' | Report | Ord 24' |

Civic Stadium, Portland
Attendance: 35,548
Referee: Toros Kibritjan (United States)

| New York Cosmos | Seattle Sounders |

| GK | 1 | (United States) Shep Messing |
| DF | 12 | (United States) Bobby Smith |
| DF | 4 | (United States) Werner Roth (c) |
| DF | 25 | (Brazil) Carlos Alberto | (yellow card) 74:29' |
| MF | 14 | (Brazil) Nelsi Morais |
| MF | 8 | (England) Terry Garbett | | (substituted off) 45:00' |
| MF | 6 | (Germany) Franz Beckenbauer | (yellow card) 63:21' |
| FW | 7 | (England) Tony Field |
| FW | 10 | (Brazil) Pelé |
| FW | 9 | (Italy) Giorgio Chinaglia |
| FW | 11 | (England) Steve Hunt |
Substitutes:
| MF | 3 | (Socialist Federal Republic of Yugoslavia) Vito Dimitrijević | (yellow card) 66:34' | (substituted on) 45:00' |
| GK | 19 | (Turkey) Erol Yasin |
Manager:
(Italy) Eddie Firmani

| GK | 1 | (Canada) Tony Chursky |
| DF | 4 | (England) Mel Machin |
| DF | 3 | (United States) Jim McAlister |
| DF | 5 | (Wales) Mike England |
| DF | 17 | (Scotland) Dave Gillett |
| MF | 16 | (England) Adrian Webster (c) |
| MF | 15 | (England) Steve Buttle |
| MF | 19 | (Scotland) Jimmy Robertson | (substituted off) 79:49' |
| MF | 2 | (Scotland) Jocky Scott |
| FW | 18 | (England) Tommy Ord (yellow card) 16:58' |
| FW | 12 | (England) Micky Cave | (substituted off) 68:07' |
Substitutes:
| MF | 8 | (England) David Butler | (substituted on) 68:07' |
| FW | 6 | (England) Tommy Jenkins | (substituted on) 79:49' |
| GK | 26 | (United States) Mike Ivanow |
Manager:
(England) Jim Gabriel

Soccer Bowl MVP:
Steve Hunt (Cosmos)
Assistant referees:
(United States) John Davies
(United States) Bob Morgan

Television: TVS
Announcers: Jon Miller, Paul Gardner
Touchline reporter: Walt Chyzowych

== Match statistics ==
First half
| Statistic | Cosmos | Seattle |
|---|---|---|
| Goals scored | 1 | 1 |
| Total shots | 16 | 13 |
| Shots on target | 9 | 6 |
| Saves | 5 | 8 |
| Corner kicks | 8 | 2 |
| Fouls | x | x |
| Offsides | x | x |
| Yellow cards | 0 | 1 |
| Red cards | 0 | 0 |

Second half
| Statistic | Cosmos | Seattle |
|---|---|---|
| Goals scored | 1 | 0 |
| Total shots | 13 | 13 |
| Shots on target | 1 | 6 |
| Saves | 6 | 0 |
| Corner kicks | 5 | 3 |
| Fouls | x | x |
| Offsides | x | x |
| Yellow cards | 3 | 0 |
| Red cards | 0 | 0 |

Overall
| Statistic | Cosmos | Seattle |
|---|---|---|
| Goals scored | 2 | 1 |
| Total shots | 29 | 26 |
| Shots on target | 10 | 12 |
| Saves | 11 | 8 |
| Corner kicks | 13 | 6 |
| Fouls | 11 | 14 |
| Offsides | 1 | 2 |
| Yellow cards | 3 | 1 |
| Red cards | 0 | 0 |

== See also ==
- 1977 North American Soccer League season
