= Tony Chursky =

Canadian soccer player

Personal information
- Date of birth: June 13, 1953 (age 73)
- Place of birth: New Westminster, British Columbia, Canada
- Height: 5 ft 10 in (1.78 m)
- Position: Goalkeeper

Youth career
- Vancouver Croatia
- 1969–1970: Vancouver Spartans
- Simon Fraser University

Senior career*
Years	Team	Apps	(Gls)
1976–1978	Seattle Sounders	72	(0)
1979	California Surf	4	(0)
1979	Chicago Sting	14	(0)
1980–1982	Toronto Blizzard	56	(0)
1983–1985	Tacoma Stars (indoor)	27	(0)

International career^{‡}
1973–1981	Canada	19	(0)
- * Club domestic league appearances and goals as of 17:47, 24 February 2007 (UTC) ‡ National team caps and goals as of 7 December 2006

Tony Chursky (born June 13, 1953, in New Westminster, Canada) is a former Canadian national soccer team and NASL goalkeeper.

== Playing career ==
Chursky grew up in Vancouver, British Columbia and attended Simon Fraser University where he graduated with a degree in English Literature. He is of Ukrainian descent.

He joined the Seattle Sounders of the North American Soccer League (NASL) in 1976 and finished with the league's best record for goalkeepers. Despite that, he did not gain any official recognition, whether as an All Star or Rookie of the Year. Chursky played three seasons for the Seattle Sounders before being traded to the California Surf for Al Trost in January 1979. The Surf turned around and traded him to the Chicago Sting later that season. In and finally the Toronto Blizzard. He played in 145 NASL regular season games and 11 play off games including Soccer Bowl 1977 against the New York Cosmos. Despite his outstanding career, Chursky will be remembered by many for the mistake which led to the Cosmos first goal over the Sounders in Pele's August 1977 final match. Chursky saved a shot, then put the ball on the ground and began dribbling towards his goal. Cosmos forward Steve Hunt rushed at Chursky who, due to being deaf in one ear, did not hear his teammates' cries. Hunt stole the ball, dribbled it towards the Seattle goal, pursued by Chursky, and scored the game's first goal. The Sounders tied the score before halftime. Giorgio Chinaglia then scored to win the game for the Cosmos in the second half. The Sounders best chance to tie was a low shot from super-sub Steve Buttle, which went wide right.

Chursky played MISL pro indoor soccer for at least two seasons with the Tacoma Stars.

== International career ==
Chursky made an impressive debut in goal for Canada against Poland on 1 August 1973 in Toronto in a 1–3 defeat while still an unknown amateur. He would go on to earn 19 caps with the national team. Chursky's final cap came on 14 October 1981 against Guadeloupe in Pointe-à-Pitre in a 2–1 victory. He replaced Tino Lettieri at half time.

Chursky also was a member of the Canadian squad at the 1975 Pan American Games.

== Personal life ==
His son Alex Chursky is current Assistant Coach at Seattle University Athletics and was member of the Canada U-20 men's national soccer team.

== Writing career ==
In 2019 he co-authored Sounders Together; Friends Forever with his friend and Seattle Sounders team mate, Adrian Webster
