= Mervyn Cawston =

English footballer

Personal information
- Full name: Mervyn William Cawston
- Date of birth: 4 February 1952 (age 74)
- Place of birth: Diss, England
- Position: Goalkeeper

Youth career
- Norwich City

Senior career*
Years	Team	Apps	(Gls)
1970–1976	Norwich City	4	(0)
1974	→ Southend United (loan)	10	(0)
1975	→ Chicago Sting (loan)	18	(0)
1976	→ Newport County (loan)	4	(0)
1976	→ Chicago Sting (loan)	23	(0)
1976–1977	Gillingham	19	(0)
1977–1978	Chicago Sting	49	(0)
1978–1984	Southend United	189	(0)
1984	Stoke City	0	(0)
1984	Chelmsford City		
1984–1985	Southend United	9	(0)
1985–1986	Barking		
1986–1987	Woodford Town		
1987–1988	Maidstone United		
1988–1989	Brighton & Hove Albion	0	(0)
1990	Redbridge Forest		
1999	St Albans City	0	(0)
Total		325	(0)

International career
- England Schools
- * Club domestic league appearances and goals

Mervyn William Cawston (born 4 February 1952) is an English former professional footballer who played as a goalkeeper. Active in both England and the United States, Cawston made over 300 career appearances.

== Career ==
Born in Diss, Cawston played for Norwich City, Southend United, Chicago Sting, Newport County, Gillingham, Stoke City, Chelmsford City, Barking, Woodford Town, Maidstone United, Brighton & Hove Albion and Redbridge Forest.

He played one game for St Albans City in 1999 at the age of 46, in the FA Trophy.

He also played for England Schools.

== Career statistics ==
Appearances and goals by club, season and competition
Club	Season	League			FA Cup		League Cup		Other		Total	
Club	Season	Division	Apps	Goals	Apps	Goals	Apps	Goals	Apps	Goals	Apps	Goals
Norwich City	1970–71	Second Division	4	0	0	0	0	0	0	0	4	0
Norwich City	1971–72	Second Division	0	0	0	0	0	0	0	0	0	0
Norwich City	1972–73	First Division	0	0	0	0	0	0	1	0	1	0
Norwich City	1973–74	First Division	0	0	0	0	0	0	2	0	2	0
Norwich City	Total		4	0	0	0	0	0	3	0	7	0
Southend United (loan)	1974–75	Third Division	10	0	0	0	0	0	0	0	10	0
Chicago Sting (loan)	1975	NASL	18	0	—		—		—		18	0
Newport County (loan)	1975–76	Fourth Division	4	0	0	0	0	0	0	0	4	0
Chicago Sting (loan)	1976	NASL	23	0	—		—		—		23	0
Gillingham	1976–77	Third Division	19	0	1	0	1	0	0	0	21	0
Chicago Sting	1977	NASL	26	0	—		—		—		26	0
Chicago Sting	1978	NASL	23	0	—		—		—		23	0
Chicago Sting	Total		49	0	—		—		—		49	0
Southend United	1978–79	Third Division	39	0	5	0	0	0	0	0	44	0
Southend United	1979–80	Third Division	42	0	3	0	7	0	0	0	52	0
Southend United	1980–81	Fourth Division	46	0	1	0	2	0	0	0	49	0
Southend United	1981–82	Third Division	19	0	0	0	1	0	3	0	23	0
Southend United	1982–83	Third Division	32	0	3	0	1	0	2	0	38	0
Southend United	1983–84	Third Division	11	0	0	0	2	0	0	0	13	0
Southend United	Total		189	0	12	0	13	0	5	0	219	0
Stoke City	1983–84	First Division	0	0	0	0	0	0	0	0	0	0
Southend United	1984–85	Fourth Division	9	0	2	0	0	0	2	0	13	0
Brighton & Hove Albion	1988–89	Second Division	0	0	0	0	0	0	0	0	0	0
Career total			325	0	15	0	14	0	10	0	364	0

== Honours ==
Southend United

- Football League Fourth Division: 1980–81
