= 1975 North American Soccer League season =

Soccer league season

North American Soccer League 1975 season
- Season: 1975
- Teams: 20
- Champions: Tampa Bay Rowdies
- Premiers: Portland Timbers
- Matches: 220
- Goals: 750 (3.41 per match)
- Top goalscorer: (Trinidad and Tobago) Steve David (23)
- Highest attendance: 35,620 (NY @ Washington)
- Lowest attendance: 1,146 (Seattle @ Hartford)
- Average attendance: 7,642

Statistics of North American Soccer League in season 1975. This was the 8th season of the NASL.

== Overview ==
The league comprised 20 teams with the Tampa Bay Rowdies winning the championship.

Pelé joined the New York Cosmos in 1975.

1975 was the first year the league used the term Soccer Bowl for their championship game.

== Changes from the previous season ==
=== Rules changes ===
The 1975 season saw the removal of tie games. Matches that were level after 90 minutes would go to 15 minutes of sudden death overtime, and then onto penalty kicks if needed. It would not be until 2000 that a top-tier American soccer league would again allow matches to end in a draw.

=== New teams ===
- Chicago Sting
- Hartford Bicentennials
- Portland Timbers
- San Antonio Thunder
- Tampa Bay Rowdies

=== Teams folding ===
- None

=== Teams moving ===
- None

=== Name changes ===
- Toronto Metros to Toronto Metros-Croatia*

*after merger with Toronto Croatia of National Soccer League

== Map of clubs ==
Northern Division Eastern Division Central Division Western Division

== Regular season ==
W = Wins, L = Losses, GF = Goals For, GA = Goals Against, PT= point system

6 points for a win, 1 point for a shootout win, 0 points for a loss, 1 point for each regulation goal scored up to three per game.

-Premiers (most points). -Other playoff teams.

Northern Division	W	L	GF	GA	PT
Boston Minutemen	13	9	41	29	116
Toronto Metros-Croatia	13	9	39	28	114
New York Cosmos	10	12	39	38	91
Rochester Lancers	6	16	29	49	64
Hartford Bicentennials	6	16	27	51	61

Eastern Division	W	L	GF	GA	PT
Tampa Bay Rowdies	16	6	46	27	135
Miami Toros	14	8	47	30	123
Washington Diplomats	12	10	42	47	112
Philadelphia Atoms	10	12	33	42	90
Baltimore Comets	9	13	34	52	87

Central Division	W	L	GF	GA	PT
St. Louis Stars	13	9	38	34	115
Chicago Sting	12	10	39	33	106
Denver Dynamos	9	13	37	42	85
Dallas Tornado	9	13	33	38	83
San Antonio Thunder	6	16	24	46	59

Western Division	W	L	GF	GA	PT
Portland Timbers	16	6	43	27	138
Seattle Sounders	15	7	42	28	129
Los Angeles Aztecs	12	10	42	33	107
Vancouver Whitecaps	11	11	38	28	99
San Jose Earthquakes	8	14	37	48	83

== NASL League Leaders ==
=== Scoring ===
*(2 points per goal, 1 per assist)

Player	Team	Apps	Gls	Ast	Pts
(Trinidad and Tobago) Steve David	Miami	21	23	6	52
(South Africa) Derek Smethurst	Tampa Bay	22	18	3	39
(England) Gordon Hill	Chicago	21	16	7	39
(England) Peter Withe	Portland	22	16	6	38
(Uruguay) Uri Banhoffer	Los Angeles	20	14	9	37
(England) Tommy Ord	Rochester/NY	21	16	3	35
(United States) Ilija Mitic	Dallas/SJ	19	15	3	33
(United States) Ade Coker	Boston	15	10	6	26
(South Africa) Ace Ntsoelengoe	Denver	21	10	5	25
(Australia) John Coyne	Toronto	22	7	11	25

=== Goalkeeping ===
*(1,260 minutes minimum)

Player	Team	Min	SV	GA	SH	GAA
(United States) Shep Messing	Boston	1639	140	17	6	0.93
(England) Barry Watling	Seattle	2032	140	26	6	1.15
(England) Graham Brown	Portland	1948	144	26	5	1.20
(Canada) Željko Bilecki	Toronto	1949	123	27	8	1.25
(Canada) Greg Weber	Vancouver	1273	95	19	5	1.34
(England) Mervyn Cawston	Chicago	1586	94	24	4	1.36
(England) Peter Bonetti	St. Louis	1829	189	28	5	1.38
(Bermuda) Sam Nusum	New York	1554	131	25	3	1.45
(England) Ken Cooper	Dallas	1856	130	32	4	1.55
(United States) Bob Rigby	Philadelphia	1802	144	32	4	1.60

== NASL All-Stars ==
First Team	Position	Second Team	Honorable Mention
(England) Peter Bonetti, St. Louis	G	(England) Ken Cooper, Dallas	(England) Barry Watling, Seattle
(United States) Bob Smith, Philadelphia	D	(England) Tony Want, Philadelphia	(Republic of Ireland) Tom McConville, Washington
(Wales) Mike England, Seattle	D	(England) Stewart Jump, Tampa Bay	(Scotland) Dave Gillett, Seattle
(United States) Werner Roth, New York	D	(England) Ralph Wright, Miami	(England) Graham Day, Portland
(Iran) Farrukh Quraishi, Tampa Bay	D	(Scotland) Charlie Mitchell, Rochester	(Scotland) Brian Rowan, Toronto
(Wales) Arfon Griffiths, Seattle	M	(England) Barry Powell, Portland	(England) John Sissons, Tampa Bay
(Scotland) Ronnie Sharp, Miami	M	(Scotland) John Boyle, Tampa Bay	(Scotland) Hugh Fisher, Denver
(Portugal) António Simões, Boston	M	(Scotland) Bobby Hope, Philadelphia	(Germany) Wolfgang Sühnholz, Boston
(Trinidad and Tobago) Steve David, Miami	F	(England) Peter Withe, Portland	(Bermuda) Clyde Best, Tampa Bay
(Brazil) Pelé, New York	F	(England) Tommy Ord, Roch & NY	(South Africa) Derek Smethurst, Tampa Bay
(England) Gordon Hill, Chicago	F	(Scotland) Stewart Scullion, Tampa Bay	(Uruguay) Uri Banhoffer, Los Angeles

== Playoffs ==
All playoff games in all rounds including Soccer Bowl '75 were single game elimination match ups.

=== Bracket ===
Quarterfinals
W1	Portland Timbers	2
W2	Seattle Sounders	1
C1	St. Louis Stars	1(5)
W3	Los Angeles Aztecs	1(4)
E2	Miami Toros	2
N1	Boston Minutemen	1
N2	Toronto Metros-Croatia	0
E1	Tampa Bay Rowdies	1

Semifinals
W1	Portland Timbers	1
C1	St. Louis Stars	0
E2	Miami Toros	0
E1	Tampa Bay Rowdies	3

Soccer Bowl '75
W1	Portland Timbers	0
E1	Tampa Bay Rowdies	2

=== Quarterfinals ===
August 12	Seattle Sounders	1–2 (OT)	Portland Timbers	Civic Stadium • Att. 31,523

August 13	Miami Toros	2–1 (OT)	Boston Minutemen	Nickerson Field • Att. 2,187

August 13	Los Angeles Aztecs	1 – 2 (PK, 4–5)	St. Louis Stars	Francis Field • Att. 6,119

August 13	Toronto Metros-Croatia	0–1	Tampa Bay Rowdies	Tampa Stadium • Att. 16,111

=== Semifinals ===
August 16	Miami Toros	0–3	Tampa Bay Rowdies	Tampa Stadium • Att. 22,710

August 17	St. Louis Stars	0–1	Portland Timbers	Civic Stadium • Att. 33,503

=== Soccer Bowl '75 ===
August 24
12:30 pm PDT

Tampa Bay Rowdies	2–0	Portland Timbers
Auguste (66:00); Best (87:40)

Spartan Stadium, San Jose, California
Attendance: 17,483
Referee: Henry Landauer (USA)

1975 NASL Champions: Tampa Bay Rowdies

== Post season awards ==
- Most Valuable Player: (Trinidad and Tobago) Steve David, Miami
- Coach of the year: (England) John Sewell, St. Louis
- Rookie of the year: (United States) Chris Bahr, Philadelphia

== Attendances ==
Club	Games	Total	Average
San Jose Earthquakes	11	197,194	17,927
Seattle Sounders	11	185,000	16,818
Portland Timbers	11	159,536	14,503
Tampa Bay Rowdies	11	118,005	10,728
New York Cosmos	11	114,949	10,450
Washington Diplomats	11	97,320	8,847
Los Angeles Aztecs	11	91,372	8,307
Vancouver Whitecaps	11	83,369	7,579
Philadelphia Atoms	11	80,047	7,277
Toronto Metros	11	68,985	6,271
St. Louis Stars	11	66,777	6,071
Rochester Lancers	11	58,661	5,333
Miami Toros	11	54,127	4,921
Dallas Tornado	11	50,932	4,630
Boston Minutemen	11	48,643	4,422
San Antonio Thunder	11	48,528	4,412
Chicago Sting	11	47,542	4,322
Hartford Bicentennials	11	40,920	3,720
Denver Dynamos	11	40,194	3,654
Baltimore Comets	11	29,049	2,641
