= 1977 North American Soccer League season =

Soccer league season

North American Soccer League 1977 season
- Season: 1977
- Teams: 18
- Champions: Cosmos (2nd Title)
- Premiers: Ft. Lauderdale Strikers
- Matches: 234
- Goals: 752 (3.21 per match)
- Top goalscorer: (Trinidad and Tobago) Steve David (26)
- Highest attendance: 77,691 (Ft Lauderdale @ Cosmos)
- Lowest attendance: 1,100 (Washington @ Connecticut)
- Average attendance: 13,558

Statistics of North American Soccer League in season 1977. This was the 10th season of the NASL.

== Overview ==
The league was made up of 18 teams. The schedule was expanded to 26 games and the playoffs to 12 teams. Team rosters consisted of 17 players, 6 of which had to be U.S. or Canadian citizens. The NASL began using its own variation of the penalty shoot-out procedure for tied matches. Matches tied at the end of regulation would now go to a golden goal overtime period and, if still tied, on to a shoot-out. Instead of penalty kicks however, the shoot-out attempt started 35 yards from the goal and allowed the player 5 seconds to attempt a shot. The player could make as many moves as he wanted in a breakaway situation within the time frame. NASL procedure also called for the box score or score-line to show an additional "goal" given to the winning side of a shoot-out. This "victory goal" however was not credited in the "Goals For" column of the league table. The Cosmos defeated the Seattle Sounders in the final on August 28 to win the championship.

== Changes from the previous season ==
=== New teams ===
- None

=== Teams folding ===
- Boston Minutemen
- Philadelphia Atoms

=== Teams moving ===
- Miami Toros - Fort Lauderdale Strikers
- San Antonio Thunder - Team Hawaii
- San Diego Jaws - Las Vegas Quicksilvers

=== Name changes ===
- Hartford Bicentennials to Connecticut Bicentennials
- Cosmos drop "New York" from name

== Map of clubs ==
Northern Division Eastern Division Southern Division Western Division

== Regular season ==
W = Wins, L = Losses, GF = Goals For, GA = Goals Against, BP = Bonus Points, Pts= point system

6 points for a win, 0 points for a loss, 1 point for each regulation goal scored up to three per game.

-Premiers (most points). -Other playoff teams.

=== Atlantic Conference ===
Eastern Division	W	L	GF	GA	BP	Pts	Home	Road
Fort Lauderdale Strikers	19	7	49	29	47	161	11-2	8-5
Cosmos	15	11	60	39	50	140	10-3	5-8
Tampa Bay Rowdies	14	12	55	45	47	131	11-2	3-10
Washington Diplomats	10	16	32	49	32	92	6-7	4-9

Northern Division	W	L	GF	GA	BP	Pts	Home	Road
Toronto Metros-Croatia	13	13	42	38	37	115	8-5	5-8
St. Louis Stars	12	14	33	35	32	104	7-6	5-8
Rochester Lancers	11	15	34	41	33	99	10-3	1-12
Chicago Sting	10	16	31	43	28	88	4-9	6-7
Connecticut Bicentennials	7	19	34	65	30	72	4-9	3-10

=== Pacific Conference ===
Southern Division	W	L	GF	GA	BP	Pts	Home	Road
Dallas Tornado	18	8	56	37	53	161	11-2	7-6
Los Angeles Aztecs	15	11	65	54	57	147	8-5	7-6
San Jose Earthquakes	14	12	37	44	35	119	9-4	5-8
Team Hawaii	11	15	45	59	40	106	7-6	4-9
Las Vegas Quicksilvers	11	15	38	44	37	103	8-5	3-10

Western Division	W	L	GF	GA	BP	Pts	Home	Road
Minnesota Kicks	16	10	44	36	41	137	11-2	5-8
Vancouver Whitecaps	14	12	43	36	40	124	10-3	4-9
Seattle Sounders	14	12	43	34	39	123	9-4	5-8
Portland Timbers	10	16	39	42	38	98	7-6	3-10

== NASL All-Stars ==
First Team	Position	Second Team	Honorable Mention
(England) Gordon Banks, Ft. Lauderdale	G	(United States) Alan Mayer, Las Vegas	(Canada) Tony Chursky, Seattle
(Germany) Franz Beckenbauer, Cosmos	D	(England) Ray Evans, St. Louis	(England) Steve Litt, Minnesota
(Wales) Mike England, Seattle	D	(United States) Steve Pecher, Dallas	(United States) Jim McAlister, Seattle
(Canada) Bruce Wilson, Vancouver	D	(Portugal) Humberto Coelho, Las Vegas	(United States) Alan Merrick, Minnesota
(England) Mel Machin, Seattle	D	(England) George Ley, Dallas • (Haiti) Arsène Auguste Tampa Bay	(England) Graham Day, Portland
(Northern Ireland) George Best, Los Angeles	M	(Scotland) Charlie Cooke, Los Angeles	(Portugal) Tony Simões, San Jose
(Germany) Wolfgang Sühnholz, Las Vegas	M	(Socialist Federal Republic of Yugoslavia) Vito Dimitrijević, Cosmos	(South Africa) Ace Ntsoelengoe, Minnesota
(England) Alan West, Minnesota	M	(England) Rodney Marsh, Tampa Bay	(United States) Al Trost, St. Louis
(Trinidad and Tobago) Steve David, Los Angeles	F	(Canada) Mike Stojanović, Rochester	(Scotland) Willie Morgan, Chicago
(Brazil) Pelé, Cosmos	F	(South Africa) Steve Wegerle, Tampa Bay	(Italy) Giorgio Chinaglia, Cosmos
(South Africa) Derek Smethurst, Tampa Bay	F	(Canada) Buzz Parsons, Vancouver	(Scotland) Jimmy Robertson, Seattle

== Playoffs ==
The first round and the Soccer Bowl were single game match ups, while the conference semifinals and championships were all two-game series.

=== Bracket ===
First Round
Cosmos	3
Tampa Bay Rowdies	0
St. Louis Stars	0(2)
Rochester Lancers	1(4)
Los Angeles Aztecs	2
San Jose Earthquakes	1
Vancouver Whitecaps	0
Seattle Sounders	2

Division Championships
Fort Lauderdale Strikers	3	2(0)
Cosmos	8	3(3)
Toronto Metros-Croatia	0(2)	0
Rochester Lancers	1(3)	1
Dallas Tornado	1	1
Los Angeles Aztecs	3	5
Minnesota Kicks	1	0
Seattle Sounders	2	1

Conference Championships
Cosmos	2	4
Rochester Lancers	1	1
Los Angeles Aztecs	1	0
Seattle Sounders	3	1

Soccer Bowl '77
Cosmos	2
Seattle Sounders	1

=== First round ===
August 10	San Jose Earthquakes	1–2 (OT)	Los Angeles Aztecs	Los Angeles Memorial Coliseum • Att. 4,038

August 10	Tampa Bay Rowdies	0–3	Cosmos	Giants Stadium • Att. 57,828

August 10	Rochester Lancers	1–0 (SO, 4–2)	St. Louis Stars	Francis Field • Att. 7,137

August 10	Seattle Sounders	2–0	Vancouver Whitecaps	Empire Stadium • Att. 21,915

=== Division Championships ===
Higher seed		Lower seed	Game 1	Game 2	(lower seed hosts Game 1)
Fort Lauderdale Strikers	-	Cosmos	3–8	2–3 (SO, 0–3)	August 14 • Giants Stadium • 77,691; August 17 • Lockhart Stadium 14,152
Dallas Tornado	-	Los Angeles Aztecs	1–3	1–5	August 14 • Los Angeles Memorial Coliseum • 5,201; August 17 • Ownby Stadium • 18,489
Minnesota Kicks	-	Seattle Sounders	*1–2 (OT)	0–1	*August 14 • Metropolitan Stadium • 35,889; August 17 • Kingdome • 42,091
Toronto Metros-Croatia	-	Rochester Lancers	0–1 (SO, 2–3)	0–1	August 13 • Holleder Memorial Stadium • 10,556; August 16 • Varsity Stadium • 8,062

*Minnesota Kicks hosted Game 1 (instead of Game 2) due to a scheduling conflict with the Twins baseball club.

=== Conference Championships ===
Higher seed		Lower seed	Game 1	Game 2	(lower seed hosts Game 1)
Los Angeles Aztecs	-	Seattle Sounders	1–3	#0–1	August 21 • Los Angeles Memorial Coliseum • 9,115 #August 25 • Kingdome • 56,256
Cosmos	-	Rochester Lancers	2–1	4–1	August 21 • Holleder Memorial Stadium • 20,005; August 24 • Giants Stadium • 73,669

#Seattle Sounders hosted Game 2 (instead of Game 1) due to a scheduling conflict with the Mariners baseball club.

=== Soccer Bowl '77 ===
August 28
4:00 pm EDT

Cosmos	2–1	Seattle Sounders
Hunt (19:05); Chinaglia (77:19)		Ord (23:13)

Civic Stadium, Portland
Attendance: 35,548
Referee: Toros Kibritjan (USA)

1977 NASL Champions: Cosmos

== Post season awards ==
- Most Valuable Player: (Germany) Franz Beckenbauer, Cosmos
- Coach of the year: (England) Ron Newman, Fort Lauderdale
- Rookie of the year: (United States) Jim McAlister, Seattle

== Average home attendance ==
Team	Average
New York Cosmos	34,150
Minnesota Kicks	32,771
Seattle Sounders	24,226
Tampa Bay Rowdies	19,491
San Jose Earthquakes	17,739
Dallas Tornado	16,510
Portland Timbers	13,208
Washington Diplomats	13,037
Vancouver Whitecaps	11,897
Los Angeles Aztecs	9,638
St. Louis Stars	9,126
Fort Lauderdale Strikers	8,140
Toronto Metros	7,321
Las Vegas Quicksilvers	7,079
Rochester Lancers	6,065
Chicago Sting	5,204
Team Hawaii	4,543
Connecticut Bicentennials	3,902
