= Bob Rondeau =

- Born: 1949 or 1950 (age 76–77)
- Education: Colorado (1972)
- Occupation: Sports announcer
- Spouse: Molly
- Children: Lorrin, Jordan, Jessie

Bob Rondeau is a retired American sports announcer. He is known for a 37-year career associated with University of Washington athletics.

== Early life ==
Rondeau grew up in Colorado. He majored in journalism at Colorado, graduating in 1972.

== Career ==
Rondeau began his career as a news reporter and anchor in Cortez, Denver, and then Phoenix. Those experiences left him disillusioned with the news business. His first experience as a sports broadcaster was in the summer of 1977 when he called several races at Turf Paradise, a horse racing track in Phoenix.

Rondeau joined KOMO radio in Seattle as sports director in 1977, after passing on an offer from local competitor KIRO which was looking for a news reporter. The next year, KOMO acquired the broadcast rights for both Washington football and basketball games. Rondeau became an analyst for the Washington Huskies football broadcast in 1978, then play-by-play announcer in 1981. He later became announcer for the men's basketball team, holding that role for over 30 years. For four decades, he was known for bellowing "Touchdown Washington!" after every Husky touchdown. Earlier, he served as the play-by-play announcer for the original Seattle Sounders for two years beginning in 1979, despite having no familiarity with the sport of soccer.

In April 2017, Rondeau announced his retirement effective at the end of the football season. Tony Castricone was named his successor.

== Awards ==
Rondeau was named Washington State Sportscaster of the Year eleven times. In 2016 Rondeau was the recipient of the National Football Foundation's annual Chris Schenkel Award, in recognition of distinguished broadcasting careers in college football. He was inducted into the Husky Athletics Hall of Fame in 2016. King County proclaimed Roundeau's last home broadcast of the Apple Cup on November 25, 2017, as "Bob Rondeau Day."

== Family ==
Rondeau and wife Molly married on the 50-yard line of Husky Stadium on July 26, 1997. They have two daughters, Lorrin and Jessie, a son Jordan and three grandsons, Joseph, Dominic and Zachary,

== See also ==
- Bob Rondeau at IMDb
