= Steve Hunt (footballer, born 1956) =

English footballer (born 1956)

Personal information
- Full name: Stephen Kenneth Hunt
- Date of birth: 4 August 1956 (age 70)
- Place of birth: Birmingham, England
- Height: 5 ft 7 in (1.70 m)
- Positions: Midfielder; left winger

Youth career
- 1972–1974: Aston Villa

Senior career*
Years	Team	Apps	(Gls)
1974–1977	Aston Villa	6	(1)
1977–1978	New York Cosmos	48	(20)
1978–1984	Coventry City	185	(27)
1982	→ New York Cosmos (loan)	22	(9)
1984–1986	West Bromwich Albion	68	(15)
1986–1987	Aston Villa	63	(6)
1988–1989	Willenhall Town		
Total		392	(78)

International career
1984	England	2	(0)

Managerial career
- 1988–1989: Willenhall Town
- 1996: VS Rugby (joint manager)
- 2017–2018: Cowes Sports
- * Club domestic league appearances and goals

Stephen Kenneth Hunt (born 4 August 1956) is an English former professional footballer who was later known as Steve Evans. A pacey and creative left-sided midfielder and winger with long-range shooting ability, he was capped twice for England in 1984.

A winger, he began his career at Aston Villa, making his first-team debut in April 1973. He made seven further appearances before being sold to the New York Cosmos for a £26,000 fee in June 1977. He spent two years with the Cosmos and won the Soccer Bowl in 1977 and 1978, winning the MVP award in the former and providing an assist in the latter. He returned to England to join Coventry City for a £40,000 fee in 1978. He spent six seasons with Coventry, scoring 27 goals in 185 First Division games. He spent part of the 1982 season back on loan at New York Cosmos, where he won a third Soccer Bowl title. Coventry sold Hunt on to West Bromwich Albion for £100,000 in March 1984, where he would win the club's Player of the Year award for the 1985–86 campaign. He rejoined Aston Villa for a £90,000 fee in March 1986 before being forced to retire due to a knee injury in November 1987.

He later went into coaching and managed non-League clubs Willenhall Town (as player-manager), VS Rugby and Cowes Sports. He also coached at Port Vale, Leicester City and AFC Bournemouth. He later moved to the Isle of Wight and released his autobiography in 2021.

== Club career ==
=== Aston Villa ===
Born and raised in the Witton and Perry Barr areas of Birmingham, Hunt began his professional career with hometown club Aston Villa after representing the club's associated youth teams: Stanley Star (Villa Boys) and Aston Boys, as well as the Warwickshire county side. Despite prior assurances to the contrary, he was turned down for an apprenticeship at the age of 16, only for Aston Villa to change their mind after his mother rang manager Vic Crowe to complain. The under-18 team, coached by Frank Upton, were a strong side and won tournaments in Germany, Zambia and Holland. However, Ron Saunders succeeded Crowe as first-team manager and would sell or release all of the youth team players and sign new players; in his autobiography Hunt wrote that "Saunders had huge flaws" and "lacked empathy". Hunt damaged cartilage in his knee during his debut for the reserve team and blamed the injury on Saunders' intense fitness regime.

He made his first-team debut on 23 April 1973, coming on as a substitute in a 4–0 win over Sheffield Wednesday that secured Villa's promotion into the First Division. He made his first start the following week when the team ran out to a guard of honour from the Sunderland players. He signed professional forms in January 1974. He made his First Division debut late on in the 1975–76 season, in a 0–0 draw with Liverpool at Villa Park on 10 April. He scored his first goal in senior football seven days later, in a 2–2 draw at West Ham United. He also featured against Belgian side Royal Antwerp in the UEFA Cup, which was Villa's first and Hunt's only European game. Saunders sold Hunt to the New York Cosmos in order to provide funds to build a stand at the Witton End.

=== New York Cosmos ===
"Playing for New York Cosmos was like travelling in a rock and roll band. There were always celebrities in the dressing room after games. I've always been into my music and Mick Jagger came in after one particular game."

— Hunt enjoyed his time in America

New York Cosmos coach Joe Mallett had recruited Hunt after concluding that Coventry City's 30-year-old Tommy Hutchison was too old. The club paid Aston Villa a £26,000 fee and doubled Hunt's Villa wages to £250-a-week. He scored his first goal in the North American Soccer League (NASL) in the second game of the 1977 season, a 2–1 victory at Team Hawaii on 13 April. On 15 May, he provided two assists for Pelé's hat-trick in a 3–0 win over Fort Lauderdale Strikers at Giants Stadium. Hunt scored a hat-trick himself on 5 June in a 6–0 home victory over Toronto Metros-Croatia. The Cosmos qualified for the play-offs after finishing second in the Eastern Division, and Hunt provided all three assists for Pelé and Giorgio Chinaglia's goals in their first round win over the Tampa Bay Rowdies. He scored two goals in the Cosmos 8–3 win over Fort Lauderdale Strikers in the second round first leg, with Strikers head coach Ron Newman saying that "we pretty much kept Pelé out of the game but Franz Beckenbauer and Steve Hunt killed us". Hunt also scored in the Conference Championship final win over the Rochester Lancers, which secured the Cosmos a place in Soccer Bowl '77 in what would be Pelé's final game as a professional footballer. The Cosmos won the Soccer Bowl by beating the Seattle Sounders 2–1 at the Civic Stadium; Hunt scored the opening goal and also provided an assist to Chinaglia, and was named the game's MVP. Hunt scored eight goals and laid on ten assists during his 23 games in the 1977 season.

Hunt was persuaded to stay in New Jersey after head coach Eddie Firmani and owner Ahmet Ertegun agreed to provide him with a company car and several free plane tickets home to combat his feelings of homesickness. He scored a hat-trick past Gordon Banks on the opening day of the 1978 season, in a 7–0 victory over Fort Lauderdale Strikers. Cosmos went on to dominate the National Eastern Division, finishing 67 points ahead of the second-placed Washington Diplomats and 13 points ahead of the Vancouver Whitecaps in the overall standings. Cosmos beat Minnesota Kicks in the two-game Conference semi-finals series despite losing the opening match 9–2, with Beckenbauer scoring the winning shoot-out goal. They defeated Portland Timbers in the Conference championship game to reach Soccer Bowl '78. The Cosmos took the title with a 3–1 victory over the Tampa Bay Rowdies, with Hunt assisting for Dennis Tueart's opening goal. Hunt scored 12 goals and laid on 12 assists during his 25 games in the 1978 season.

=== Coventry City ===
Hunt took a large pay cut to return to the English Football League with Coventry City, having been signed for a £40,000 fee. He scored on his debut in a 2–0 win at Derby County. Manager Gordon Milne moved Tommy Hutchison to the right-wing to accommodate Hunt in the team. Coventry played the Cosmos on 16 May 1979 in a friendly game arranged as part of Hunt's transfer. Having struggled to adapt back to the physical English game in the 1978–79 season, he established himself in the "Sky Blues" starting eleven for the 1979–80 campaign, playing as a left-sided midfielder rather than a pure winger. He formed a good understanding with Brian Roberts, who had succeeded Bobby McDonald at left-back. The Coventry team were young and inexperienced as established stars were sold off by chairman Jimmy Hill to fund the development of the club's training ground, the Sky Blue Connexion. Coventry also reached the League Cup semi-finals in 1981, where they were beaten by West Ham United. The young Coventry team had come from two goals down to win the first leg 3–2 at Highfield Road, but would lose the return fixture 2–0.

Hunt won the ATV and London Weekend goal of the season awards for the 1980–81 campaign with a goal against Birmingham City that started at the centre circle and ended with a curled shot into the top corner of the net following a one-two with Garry Thompson. New manager Dave Sexton guided Coventry to a 14th-place finish after Milne had been sacked following a poor start to the 1981–82 season. Hoping for a move to Everton, Hunt handed in a transfer request in 1982 despite having only recently signed a three-year contract and Hill informed Coventry fans that "it took our board only 20 seconds today to reject unanimously Steve Hunt's request for a transfer".

Hunt returned to the New York Cosmos in 1982. He had initially been approached by Vic Crowe, who was now coaching the Portland Timbers but found himself legally obliged to rejoin the Cosmos if he were to return to the NASL. He provided all three assists in Cosmos win over the Chicago Sting in his second debut for the club. He went on to score the series-winning goal of the final game of the post-season quarter-final win over the Tulsa Roughnecks and played in the semi-final wins over the San Diego Sockers that took the Cosmos to Soccer Bowl '82. He won his third Soccer Bowl title as the Cosmos beat the Seattle Sounders at Jack Murphy Stadium, with Chinaglia scoring the only goal of the game.

Back with Coventry, he helped the club to finish one place and one point above the relegation zone in 1982–83 and signed a new two-year contract. However, he did not respond well to new manager Bobby Gould and his long ball tactics, though admitted that he was already unsettled at the club before Gould's arrival as he "was fatigued by the previous relegation battles".

"Many people may not think that survival is much of an achievement. For Coventry, in those days, it was. We stuck together. To be part of a team that sticks together in difficult circumstances is a wonderful feeling."

— Hunt was proud of his six seasons spent helping to keep Coventry in the top-flight.

=== West Bromwich Albion ===
Hunt was sold to First Division rivals West Bromwich Albion for £100,000 in March 1984. He was signed on the same day as Tony Grealish, a defensive-minded midfielder who went on to form an effective combination with the attack-minded Hunt. He enjoyed the expansive passing football encouraged at The Hawthorns by manager Johnny Giles, which contrasted to the more restrictive style he had endured at Coventry. He played as a left-sided midfielder, combining well with winger Tony Morley and full-back Derek Statham. The "Baggies" finished 17th at the end of the 1983–84 campaign and moved up to 12th in 1984–85. However, Albion endured a disastrous start to the 1985–86 season, and Giles resigned after nine successive defeats. Nobby Stiles stepped up from coaching the youth team to lead the first team, before Ron Saunders took charge in January 1986; Hunt later said that "I knew when he arrived that my time at Albion was coming to an end". West Brom were relegated to the Second Division at the end of the season, though Hunt was named as the club's Player of the Year after the Sports Argus reported that he had "battled, almost alone, to keep Albion up".

=== Return to Aston Villa ===
In March 1986, Hunt rejoined Aston Villa for a fee valued at £90,000, with Darren Bradley going the other way in part-exchange. Villa were in the process of salary cuts and the breaking up of the 1982 European Cup winning side under the chairmanship of Doug Ellis. He scored an own goal two minutes into his second home debut, though a brace from Steve Hodge was enough to give Villa the victory over West Ham United. Villa lost only one of the eight games immediately following Hunt's return and their form improved enough to end the 1985–86 season three points above the relegation zone. John Pearson, writing in the Birmingham Evening Mail, said that "Steve Hunt's qualities of ball control, composure and precision passing have been the major reason in Villa's surge to safety".

Graham Turner was sacked after a poor start to the 1986–87 campaign, with a 6–0 defeat to Nottingham Forest bringing his two years in charge to a close. Hunt felt that Turner's successor, Billy McNeill, "seemed unable to change the mood" at Villa Park as results continued to go against the "Villans" and that the new manager quickly lost the dressing room. Aston Villa were relegated to last place at the end of the 1986–87 season, and Hunt had to retire due to a knee injury in November 1987.

== International career ==
Hunt was in Ron Greenwood's preliminary 40-man squad for the 1982 FIFA World Cup, but was ultimately not selected. He represented an England XI against a London FA XI, providing an assist for Kevin Keegan, who said that "Steve Hunt will definitely win an international cap and he deserves the chance". He made two international appearances for England, making his debut as a substitute for Mark Chamberlain in a 1–1 draw with Scotland at Hampden Park on 26 May 1984. He then played in a 2–0 defeat to the Soviet Union at Wembley seven days later, entering the game as a substitute for John Barnes. Manager Bobby Robson also took him on the tour of South America later that summer, though he remained on the bench as only 13 of the 20-man squad would earn caps during the tour. He later was an unused substitute for games against East Germany and Turkey.

== Style of play ==
Hunt had pace, creativity and long-range shooting ability.

== Coaching career ==
After retiring as a player, Hunt purchased a van and started a living delivering building materials. He then became player-manager of Southern League side Willenhall Town, and in July 1989 became the youth team coach at Port Vale. He took up the same post at Leicester City in June 1991. One of the players he helped to develop was Julian Joachim. However, he was sacked after chairman Martin George took a disliking to him. He later moved to the Isle of Wight and had a role with AFC Bournemouth's Community Sports Trust. He spent part of 1996 as co-manager at VS Rugby, alongside David Jones. He was dissatisfied with working in the game though and instead found work at a hardware store and as a school caretaker. On 22 April 2017, he was appointed as manager at Wessex League club Cowes Sports. He led the "Yachtsmen" to a 19th-place finish at the end of the 2017–18 season, one place above the Premier Division's relegation zone. He resigned as manager on 21 August 2018, just four games into the 2018–19 season, citing a wish to take a break from the game.

== Personal life ==
He married Sue, his first wife, in 1977. He has three children: Simon, Natalie and Jonathan. He married his second wife, Kirsty, who he met whilst working at Leicester City. A Bruce Springsteen fan who has seen "the Boss" over 60 times in concert, he considered taking the name Springsteen as his surname but instead changed his name to Evans in tribute to his uncle. In 2021, Hunt released his autobiography, I'm with the Cosmos.

== Career statistics ==
Appearances and goals by club, season and competition
Club	Season	League			FA Cup		Other^{[A]}		Total	
Club	Season	Division	Apps	Goals	Apps	Goals	Apps	Goals	Apps	Goals
Aston Villa	1974–75	Second Division	2	0	0	0	0	0	2	0
Aston Villa	1975–76	First Division	4	1	0	0	1	0	5	1
Aston Villa	1976–77	First Division	1	0	0	0	1	0	1	0
Aston Villa	Total		7	1	0	0	2	0	9	1
New York Cosmos	1977	NASL	23	8	—		—		23	8
New York Cosmos	1978	NASL	25	12	—		—		25	12
New York Cosmos	Total		48	20	—		—		48	20
Coventry City	1978–79	First Division	24	6	0	0	0	0	24	6
Coventry City	1979–80	First Division	35	1	0	0	3	0	38	1
Coventry City	1980–81	First Division	40	6	3	0	9	2	52	8
Coventry City	1981–82	First Division	36	9	4	3	1	0	41	12
Coventry City	1982–83	First Division	35	4	3	0	3	1	41	5
Coventry City	1983–84	First Division	15	1	4	1	1	0	20	2
Coventry City	Total		185	27	14	4	17	3	216	34
New York Cosmos	1982	NASL	22	9	—		—		22	9
West Bromwich Albion	1983–84	First Division	12	2	0	0	0	0	12	2
West Bromwich Albion	1984–85	First Division	37	9	1	0	5	1	44	10
West Bromwich Albion	1985–86	First Division	19	4	1	1	9	3	29	8
West Bromwich Albion	Total		68	15	2	1	14	4	84	20
Aston Villa	1985–86	First Division	12	2	0	0	0	0	12	2
Aston Villa	1986–87	First Division	39	2	2	2	6	0	47	4
Aston Villa	1987–88	Second Division	11	2	0	0	2	0	13	2
Aston Villa	Total		62	6	2	2	8	0	72	8
Career total			392	78	18	7	41	7	451	92

A. The "Other" column constitutes appearances and goals in the League Cup, Football League Trophy, Football League play-offs and Full Members Cup.

== Honours ==
Individual

- NASL All-Stars Second Team: 1978, 1982
- West Bromwich Albion F.C. Player of the Year: 1985–86

New York Cosmos

- Soccer Bowl: 1977, 1978 & 1982
