= John Rowlands (footballer) =

English footballer (1947–2020)

Personal information
- Full name: John Henry Rowlands
- Date of birth: 7 February 1947
- Place of birth: Liverpool, England
- Date of death: 26 April 2020 (aged 73)
- Place of death: Cumbria, England
- Positions: Defender; forward

Senior career*
Years	Team	Apps	(Gls)
- Marine
- Skelmersdale United
1967–1968	Mansfield Town	13	(3)
1968–1969	Torquay United	18	(4)
1968	→ Exeter City (loan)	1	(0)
1969	Cape Town City		
1969–1971	Stockport County	46	(11)
1971–1972	Barrow	54	(6)
1972–1974	Workington	51	(11)
1974	Crewe Alexandra	35	(1)
1974–1975	Seattle Sounders	41	(19)
1975–1977	Hartlepool United	49	(10)
1976	→ San Jose Earthquakes (loan)	20	(1)
1977	Wigan Athletic	4	(1)
1977–1978	San Jose Earthquakes	36	(1)
1978	Oakland Stompers	7	(0)
1979	Tulsa Roughnecks	6	(0)
1979–1980	San Jose Earthquakes	22	(0)
Total		403	(68)
- * Club domestic league appearances and goals

John Henry Rowlands (7 February 1947 – 26 April 2020) was an English professional footballer who played as a defender and a forward. Active in England, South Africa and the United States, Rowlands made nearly 400 appearances in a 13-year career.

== Career ==
Born in Liverpool, Rowlands began his career in non-league football with Marine and Skelmersdale United, before signing for Mansfield Town as an amateur in October 1967. He went on to play professionally in England, South Africa and the United States for Mansfield Town, Torquay United, Exeter City, Cape Town City, Stockport County, Barrow, Workington, Crewe Alexandra, the Seattle Sounders, Hartlepool United, the San Jose Earthquakes, the Oakland Stompers and the Tulsa Roughnecks.

In 1977, he briefly played for Wigan Athletic in the Northern Premier League, scoring one goal in four appearances.

In 1980 he was contracted to play with ASL expansion team the Phoenix Fire, but the team folded in pre-season.

== Later life and death ==
After retirement, Rowlands moved to Florida and opened a number of bars and restaurants, before later returning to the UK.

He died on 26 April 2020, at the age of 73, from COVID-19.
