= Steve Buttle =

English footballer (1953–2012)

Personal information
- Date of birth: 1 January 1953
- Place of birth: Norwich, England
- Date of death: 5 June 2012 (aged 59)
- Place of death: Norwich, England
- Position: Midfielder

Senior career*
Years	Team	Apps	(Gls)
1971–1973	Ipswich Town	0	(0)
1973–1977	Bournemouth	139	(12)
1977–1982	Seattle Sounders	151	(15)
1981–1982	Seattle Sounders (indoor)	17	(8)
1979–1980	Pittsburgh Spirit (indoor)	28	(35)
1982–1985	Pittsburgh Spirit (indoor)	70	(24)

Managerial career
- 1985–1986: Pittsburgh Spirit (assistant)
- 1987–1988: Tacoma Stars (assistant)
- * Club domestic league appearances and goals

Stephen A. Buttle (1 January 1953 – 5 June 2012) was an English professional footballer who played as a midfielder. He spent six seasons in England, six in the North American Soccer League and at least three in the Major Indoor Soccer League.

== Career ==
Buttle was born in Norwich. In 1971, he began his professional career with Ipswich Town, but never played a first team game before being sent to AFC Bournemouth in 1973.

In 1977, Buttle signed with the Seattle Sounders of the North American Soccer League. In the summer of 1981, he rejected an overture from Norwich City to sign him in order to remain with the Sounders. Ironically, the Sounders released him in 1982. By then he had already spent at least one season with the Pittsburgh Spirit in the Major Indoor Soccer League. During the 1979–80 MISL season, he scored 35 goals in 28 games. Buttle injured his knee at the beginning of the 1984–85 season. He spent most of the season on injured reserve. On 9 January 1985, the Pittsburgh Spirit hired Buttle as an assistant coach to replace Mickey Cave, the previous assistant who had died in November 1984. In October 1985, the Spirit released Buttle. In September 1986, the Tacoma Stars hired Buttle as an assistant coach. The Stars fired Buttle, along with head coach Alan Hinton, on 22 February 1988. The Stars were sold to new ownership following the season. The new owners rehired Hinton as head coach and in August 1988 brought Buttle back in as assistant. Hinton and Buttle lasted until December 1989 when they were fired permanently.

Buttle died on 5 June 2012 at his home in Norwich, England after a long battle with cancer.
