= Barry Watling =

English footballer

Personal information
- Full name: Barry Watling
- Date of birth: 16 July 1946 (age 80)
- Place of birth: Walthamstow, England
- Position: Goalkeeper

Youth career
- 1964–1965: Leyton Orient

Senior career*
Years	Team	Apps	(Gls)
1967–1969	Bristol City	2	(0)
1967–1968	→ Chelmsford City (loan)	10	(0)
1969–1972	Notts County	66	(0)
1972–1976	Hartlepool United	139	(0)
1974–1975	→ Seattle Sounders (loan)	42	(0)
1975	→ Chester City (loan)	5	(0)
1976	→ Rotherham United (loan)	5	(0)
1976	Sheffield Wednesday	1	(0)
Total		228	(0)

Managerial career
- Maidstone United (player/manager)
- * Club domestic league appearances and goals

Barry Watling is a footballer who played as a goalkeeper in the Football League for Bristol City, Notts County, Hartlepool United, Chester City, Rotherham United and Sheffield Wednesday.

He also played for the North American Soccer League's (N.A.S.L.) Seattle Sounders during the 1974 and 1975 seasons, and was named as the First Team All Star Goalkeeper for the 1974 season. During the 1975 season he amassed a 2nd-best goals against average of 1.15 per game.
