= Trans-Atlantic Challenge Cup =

- Founded: 1980
- Teams: 4
- Most championships: New York Cosmos (3 titles)

The Trans-Atlantic Challenge Cup was a friendly association football competition, held in the summer from 1980 to 1984. It was hosted by the New York Cosmos of the original North American Soccer League.

== History ==
The Cosmos won the inaugural Trans-Atlantic Challenge Cup defeating the Vancouver Whitecaps 5 points to 4.

The second Trans-Atlantic Challenge Cup was held in May. Representing the US were the Cosmos, 1980 league champions and Seattle, #2 point getters against Glasgow Celtic and Southampton. Once again, the US teams came out on top, with Seattle defeating Southampton 3–1, and Glasgow Celtic 2–1. The Cosmos shutout Glasgow 2–0 before finishing Southampton 2–1. Glasgow Celtic took the consolation game, and Seattle and New York battled to a championship draw before 40,000 spectators at Giants Stadium in East Rutherford, NJ. Seattle won the tournament, having outscored the Cosmos 8–7. Attendance averaged nearly 30,000 for the tournament, which provided the local soccer fans a good dose of high quality international soccer.

The Trans-Atlantic Challenge Cup returned for its third season. The Chicago Sting, 1981 Soccer Bowl champions, and the New York Cosmos, 1981 regular season leader and 1980 and 1981 TACC titlist, represented the NASL. Napoli of Italy Serie 'A', and Nacional of Uruguay, the 1981 World Club champion finished the pool. The series was launched May 26, 1982 before 28,887 at Giants Stadium, as Napoli and the Cosmos battled to a 2–2 draw. The next day, Nacional and the Sting drew 0–0. On May 29, the Cosmos defeated Nacional and Chicago defeated Napoli by identical 3–1 scores, leading to the championship doubleheader, where Napoli defeated Nacional 3–0 and the Chicago Sting defeated New York 4–3 to take their first title. Unlike the first two years, even this popular event failed to draw large crowds this season.

The Trans-Atlantic Challenge Cup's fourth season again featured the New York Cosmos and Seattle Sounders, along with Fiorentina of Italy and São Paulo of Brazil. New York and Seattle took the first games, but São Paulo and Fiorentina took the second. In the doubleheader on June 5, Fiorentina defeated São Paulo 5–3 and New York defeated Seattle 4–1, giving the Cosmos the title over Fiorentina based on goal differential. Once again, the New York fans came in droves, with 51,000 for the final, but Seattle fans stayed away, averaging only about 6,000 at the Kingdome.

The final tournament in 1984 featured the Cosmos as the only North American club. They won the tournament for the third and final time by defeating Udinese in front of a crowd of 34,158 at Giants Stadium 4–1.

== Tournaments ==
Edition	Year	Winner	Runner-up	Third	Fourth	Notes
1	1980	(United States) New York Cosmos	(Canada) Vancouver Whitecaps	(England) Manchester City	(Italy) Roma	
2	1981	(United States) Seattle Sounders	(United States) New York Cosmos	(Scotland) Celtic	(England) Southampton	
3	1982	(United States) Chicago Sting	(United States) New York Cosmos	(Italy) Napoli	(Uruguay) Nacional	
4	1983	(United States) New York Cosmos	(Italy) Fiorentina	(United States) Seattle Sounders	(Brazil) São Paulo	
5	1984	(United States) New York Cosmos	(Italy) Udinese	(Spain) Barcelona	(Brazil) Fluminense	

== Performance by team ==
Team	Winner	Runner-up	Third	Fourth	Total
(United States) New York Cosmos	3	2	—	—	5
(United States) Seattle Sounders	1	—	1	—	2
(United States) Chicago Sting	1	—	—	—	1
(Canada) Vancouver Whitecaps	—	1	—	—	1
(Italy) Fiorentina	—	1	—	—	1
(Italy) Udinese	—	1	—	—	1
(Spain) Barcelona	—	—	1	—	1
(England) Manchester City	—	—	1	—	1
(Scotland) Celtic	—	—	1	—	1
(Italy) Napoli	—	—	1	—	1
(Italy) Roma	—	—	—	1	1
(England) Southampton	—	—	—	1	1
(Uruguay) Nacional	—	—	—	1	1
(Brazil) São Paulo	—	—	—	1	1
(Brazil) Fluminense	—	—	—	1	1
