= Seattle Sounders (1974–1983) =

Former American soccer team

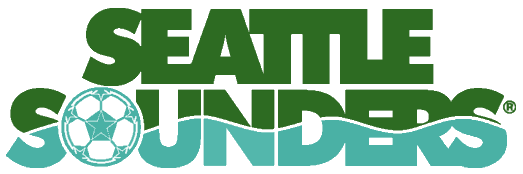
- Full name: Seattle Sounders
- Nickname: Sounders
- Founded: December 11, 1973
- Dissolved: September 6, 1983; 43 years ago
- Stadium: Memorial Stadium; Kingdome
- Capacity: 17,925; 58,218 (limited to 38,000)
- League: NASL
Home colors	Away colors

The Seattle Sounders were an American professional soccer team based in Seattle, Washington. Founded in 1974, the team belonged to the North American Soccer League where it played both indoor and outdoor soccer. The team folded after the 1983 NASL outdoor season but the name was revived in 1994 for a lower-division team and Seattle Sounders FC of the top-flight Major League Soccer, founded in 2007.

== History ==
A Seattle expansion team for the North American Soccer League was proposed in early 1973 as part of a new Western Division that would include Los Angeles, San Jose, and Vancouver. On December 11, 1973, the league awarded an expansion team to Seattle that would be owned by a group of local businessmen led by Walter Daggatt of the Alpac Corporation; the team would play at Memorial Stadium in the Western Division alongside new teams in Los Angeles, San Francisco (later moved to San Jose), and Vancouver. A naming contest was held in January 1974, with a shortlist of six finalists: Cascades, Evergreens, Mariners, Schooners, Sockeyes, and Sounders. "Sounders" was announced as the winner of the contest on January 21, having been chosen in 32 percent of the 3,735 votes cast by the public; "Mariners" finished second and was later chosen for a professional baseball team.

The Sounders assembled a roster of players from European leagues, including Americans returning from overseas, and hired John Best as their coach. They played for four days before their league debut on May 5, 1974, against Los Angeles Aztecs; the team lost 2–1 on the road with the first goal in Sounders history scored by John Rowlands. Their home debut, a week later at Memorial Stadium in Seattle, was a 4–0 victory against the Denver Dynamos in front of 12,132 spectators; Rowlands scored twice in the match. The team finished the regular season with a 13–7 record and missed the playoffs, but had six sellout crowds at Memorial Stadium that broke the venue's previous records. The Sounders averaged 13,520 per match in their inaugural season, second only to the San Jose Earthquakes among NASL teams.

During the 1974–75 offseason, Memorial Stadium was expanded to 17,925 seats for Sounders matches; the team had four more sellouts and averaged 16,830 during the 1975 season with 7,477 season ticket holders. They announced a move to the new multi-purpose Kingdome ahead of the 1976 season, planning to limit capacity to 38,000 seats for most matches but charge the same prices as their Memorial Stadium tickets. The team also moved their front offices to Pioneer Square in December 1975. The Sounders played the first sporting event at the Kingdome on April 9, 1976, hosting the New York Cosmos in an exhibition match that they lost 3–1 with 58,128 in attendance. The Sounders went on to play in two Soccer Bowls, losing in 1977 and 1982 to the Cosmos. From 1975 to 1982, the Sounders had an average attendance of over 20,000 per match at the Kingdome and Memorial Stadium.

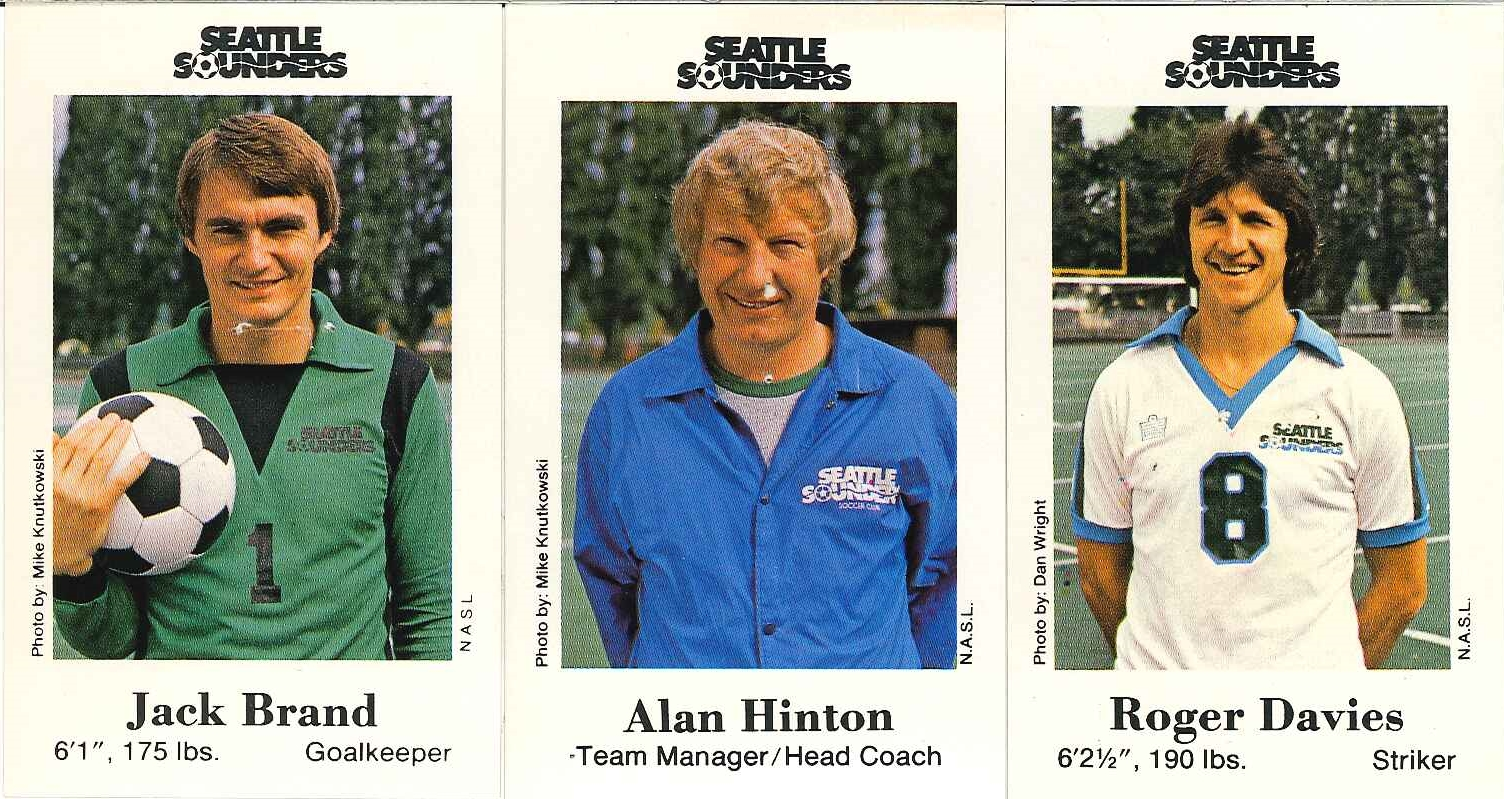
Seattle players (fltr) Jack Brand, Alan Hinton, and Roger Davies, depicted on 1980 collectible cards

Frank and Vince Coluccio bought a majority stake in the Sounders franchise in 1979. In January 1983, the Coluccios sold 75 percent of the franchise to former National Football League player and businessman Bruce Anderson and REI executive Jerry Horn, who split the shares in half; an offer to sell the team to Bud Greer for $5.8 million was rejected so the Coluccios could retain control of the Sounders. Anderson immediately announced the firing of head coach Alan Hinton, stating that the "style of play [was] not what we want to present". The team adopted a new logo, colors, and theme song as part of an "Americanization" campaign led by Anderson, which was poorly received by fans. Horn later resigned from the team's board of directors in June and sold his shares to the Coluccios, who regained majority control; Anderson resigned as team president at the same time and sold his remaining shares in August as the NASL dispatched mediators to settle the dispute between owners. Former players Jack Brand and Roger Davies had also filed lawsuits seeking unpaid wages from their terminated contracts.

The team folded on September 6, 1983, after the Coluccios struggled to keep the club afloat through the remainder of the regular season; the team did not qualify for the playoffs. The payrolls for players and staff went unpaid for several matches in August, including the EuroPac Cup against Vancouver and teams from Brazil and China. Several potential new investors had inquired about owning the Sounders, but were unable to negotiate for the rights. A plan to play the 1983–84 NASL indoor season at the Tacoma Dome was scrapped after losing to a new Major Indoor Soccer League franchise, later the Tacoma Stars; an alternate site, the Sullivan Arena in Anchorage, Alaska, was also favored by Anderson but never used. The Sounders lost an estimated $7 million in their final years of operation and the rights to the team's name were sold to Hinton. The NASL folded a year later and a new team, F.C. Seattle Storm, was formed to continue playing outdoor soccer on a semi-professional level in the city. The Storm later played in the American Professional Soccer League in 1990, but folded two years later. A new Sounders team formed in 1994 and played in the American Professional Soccer League (later the A-League and USL First Division). They were replaced by a Major League Soccer team, named Seattle Sounders FC in honor of both predecessors, which made their debut on March 19, 2009.

== Stadium ==
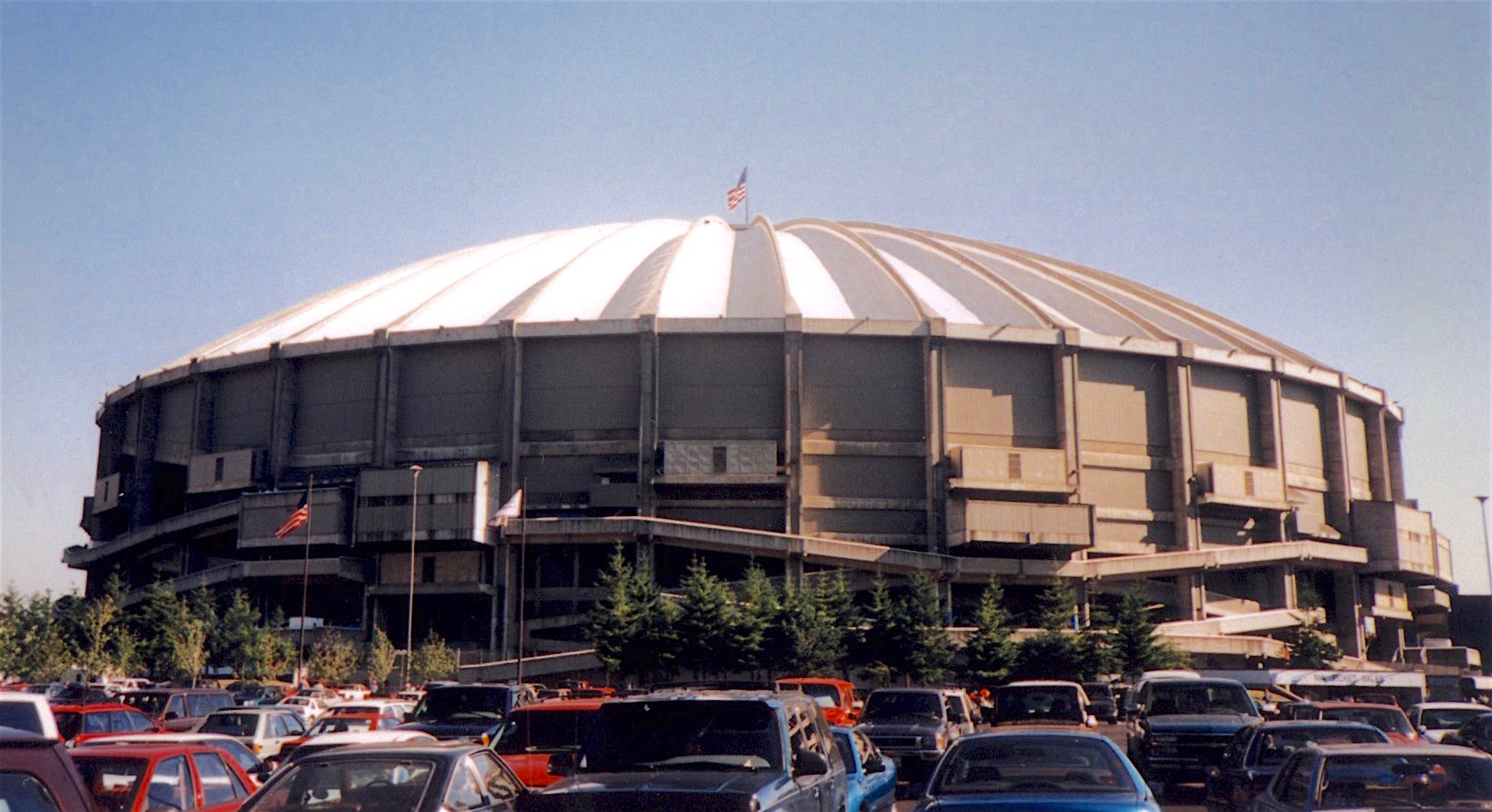
The Kingdome, the home venue of the Sounders from 1976 to 1983

The Sounders played at Memorial Stadium for their first two seasons under a lease with the Seattle School District. The stadium was expanded to 17,925 seats during the 1974–75 offseason with temporary bleachers to accommodate the team's crowds, which were among the largest in the NASL. The artificial turf pitch at Memorial Stadium was 110 yards (330 ft) long and 62 yards (186 ft) wide, among the narrowest in the league. The team also considered playing some matches, including playoff games, at Husky Stadium in the event that Memorial Stadium was too small or unavailable.

The team moved to the indoor Kingdome for the 1976 season, which it would later share with other professional sports teams. The Sounders initially limited capacity for most matches to 38,000 by using the entire lower bowl and only part of the upper bowl. On April 25, 1976, 58,218 watched the Seattle Sounders and the New York Cosmos in the first sports event held in the Kingdome. It was the largest crowd to watch a professional soccer match in the United States at the time.

From 1979 to 1982, they competed in three NASL Indoor seasons, playing their home games also at the Kingdome. The stadium was reconfigured for indoor soccer with a playing surface that was 210 feet (64 m) long and 85 feet (26 m) wide. Capacity was limited beginning in the 1981 indoor season to 16,500 seats; the following year, the field was shortened and moved closer to the western stands, while 2,500 bleacher seats were added to the east side. The Sounders attempted to move to the new Tacoma Dome for the 1983 indoor season, but lost out to the Major Indoor Soccer League's Tacoma Stars as primary tenant.

== Broadcasting ==
=== Radio ===
Radio station KVI carried all of the Sounders' regular season matches in 1974 with play-by-play commentary from Bob Robertson. The team renewed their contract with KVI for the 1975 season, with Robertson reprising his role and joined by head coach John Best for a pre-match segment. For the 1976 season, the station broadcast preseason games in addition to regular season and playoff coverage; the team paid for their radio time and sold advertising to recoup costs. The Sounders left KVI after the season due to fears it would be "overshadowed" by the station's Seattle Mariners broadcasts, which would take priority.

KIRO Radio replaced KVI as the radio broadcaster for the Sounders, with Wayne Cody assigned to play-by-play duties for the 1977 and 1978 seasons with color commentator Tommy Grieve. The team contracted with KOMO beginning in the 1979 season with Huskies announcer Bob Rondeau as play-by-play commentator for home matches alongside Grieve. Keith Askenasi, a member of the team's staff, would be the play-by-play commentator away matches. Due to scheduling conflicts, Rondeau was replaced by David Greene beginning with the 1980 indoor season. KXA and KAYO replaced KOMO for the 1981 indoor season and 1982 outdoor season; former Seattle Totems hockey commentator Rob Glazier was hired by the Sounders to replace Greene. The rights for the 1983 season were acquired by KJR with Robertson returning as play-by-play commentator.

=== Television ===
Television highlights from the team's matches were broadcast in a weekly hour-long show on KOMO beginning in the 1975 season. It was the first television arrangement for an NASL team with a terrestrial broadcaster. KOMO sports director Bruce King hosted the show and was joined by Best to explain rules and tactics for the audience. KOMO later carried a live broadcast of the team's 1975 playoff game against the Portland Timbers with commentary from King and Cliff McCrath, head coach of the Seattle Pacific Falcons collegiate soccer team. The broadcast was produced by their sister station in Portland, KATU, and was criticized for its odd direction and poor video quality.

The first live regular season broadcasts for the Sounders' away matches were aired on KSTW (Channel 11) for the 1976 season, with Robertson's radio commentary simulcast. Robertson was retained for the following season by KSTW despite KVI's contract expiring; he also became the play-by-play commentator for the rival Portland Timbers. Two matches were also broadcast by KIRO-TV on tape delay as part of an agreement with TVS. A new highlights show on KCTS was introduced for the 1978 season to cover home matches; KSTW would continue to carry live broadcasts for away matches with Robertson at the helm.

== Supporters ==
The Seattle Sounders were supported by the "Seattle Sounders Booster Club" in the 1970s and early 1980s.

== Year-by-year ==
This is a complete list of seasons for the NASL club. For a season-by-season history including the current Seattle Sounders FC MLS franchise, see History of professional soccer in Seattle.

Season	League											Position		Playoffs	USOC	Continental	Average attendance	Top goalscorer(s)	
Season	Div	League	Pld	W	L	D	GF	GA	GD	Pts	PPG	Conf.	Overall	Playoffs	USOC	Continental	Average attendance	Name	Goals
1974	1	NASL	20	10	7	3	37	17	+20	101	5.05	3rd	5th	DNQ	DNE	Ineligible	13,434	(England) John Rowlands	10
1975	1	NASL	22	15	7	0	42	28	+14	129	5.86	2nd	3rd	QF	DNE	Ineligible	16,818	(England) John Rowlands	9
1976	1	NASL	24	14	10	0	40	31	+9	123	5.13	3rd	8th	QF	DNE	Ineligible	23,828	(Canada) Gordon Wallace	13
1977	1	NASL	26	14	12	0	43	34	+9	123	4.73	5th	8th	RU	DNE	Ineligible	24,226	(England) Micky Cave	12
1978	1	NASL	30	15	15	0	50	45	+5	138	4.60	7th	12th	R1	DNE	Ineligible	22,572	(England) Micky Cave	13
1979	1	NASL	30	13	17	0	58	52	+6	125	4.17	10th	17th	DNQ	DNE	Ineligible	18,998	(England) John Ryan	12
1980	1	NASL	32	25	7	0	74	31	+43	201	6.28	2nd	2nd	QF	DNE	Ineligible	24,246	(England) Roger Davies	25
1981	1	NASL	32	15	17	0	60	62	−2	137	4.28	4th	15th	R1	DNE	Ineligible	18,224	(England) Kevin Bond	16
1982	1	NASL	32	18	14	0	72	48	+24	166	5.19	1st	2nd	RU	DNE	Ineligible	12,359	(England) Peter Ward	18
1983	1	NASL	30	12	18	0	62	61	+1	119	3.97	3rd	9th	DNQ	DNE	Ineligible	8,181	(United States) Mark Peterson (England) Peter Ward	13
Total	–	–	278	151	124	3	538	409	+129	1362	4.90	–	–	–	–	–	–	(United States) Mark Peterson	48

1. Avg. attendance include statistics from league matches only.
2. Top goalscorer(s) includes all goals scored in League, League Cup, U.S. Open Cup, CONCACAF Champions League, FIFA Club World Cup, and other competitive continental matches.

=== Indoor ===
Season	League							Position		Playoffs	Average attendance	Top goalscorer(s)	
Season	League	Pld	W	L	GF	GA	GD	Conf.	Overall	Playoffs	Average attendance	Name	Goals
1975	NASL	2	0	2	8	23	–15	4th	16th	DNQ	N/A	—	
1980–81	NASL	18	9	9	106	98	+8	4th	11th	DNQ	6,751	—	
1981–82	NASL	18	9	9	95	97	–2	4th	7th	QF	6,137	—	
Total	–	38	18	20	209	218	–9	–	–	–	–	—	

== Honors ==
=== Team honors ===
NASL championships

- 1977 runner-up
- 1982 runner-up

NASL Conference championships

- 1977 Pacific Conference

NASL Division championships

- 1977 Western Division, Pacific Conference

NASL Division Titles (regular season)

- 1980 Western Division, National Conference
- 1982 Western Division

Trans-Atlantic Challenge Cup

- 1981 Winner

Europac Cup

- 1982 Winner

League MVP

- 1980 Roger Davies
- 1982 Peter Ward

Rookie of the Year

- 1977 Jim McAlister

North American Player of the Year

- 1980 Jack Brand
- 1982 Mark Peterson

Coach of the Year

- 1980 Alan Hinton

NASL Leading Goalkeeper

- 1974 Barry Watling (GAA: 0.80)
- 1976 Tony Chursky (GAA: 0.91, SO: 9)
- 1980 Jack Brand (GAA: 0.91, SO: 15)

=== Individual honors ===
All-Star first team selections

- 1974 Barry Watling, John Rowlands
- 1975 Mike England, Arfon Griffiths
- 1976 Mike England
- 1977 Mike England
- 1978 Mike England
- 1980 Roger Davies, Bruce Rioch
- 1982 Peter Ward

All-Star second team selections

- 1974 Jimmy Gabriel, Hank Liotart
- 1980 Jack Brand, Alan Hudson, John Ryan
- 1981 Kevin Bond, Alan Hudson
- 1982 Steve Daley, Ray Evans
- 1983 Steve Daley, Ray Evans

All-Star honorable mentions

- 1974 Roy Sinclair
- 1975 Dave Gillett, Barry Watling
- 1976 Dave Gillett, Jimmy Robertson
- 1977 Tony Chursky, Jim McAlister, Jimmy Robertson
- 1979 Alan Hudson
- 1980 Tommy Hutchison, David Nish
- 1983 Peter Ward

NASL Indoor All-Stars

- 1980–81 Alan Hudson (All-West)
- 1981–82 Alan Hudson (Pacific Conference)

U.S. Soccer Hall of Fame

- 2006 Al Trost

Canadian Soccer Hall of Fame

- 2003 Ian Bridge
- 2004 Tony Chursky
- 2008 Jack Brand
- 2014 Chris Bennett

== Coaches ==
- (United States) , John Best 1974–1976
- (Scotland) Jimmy Gabriel, 1977–1979
- (England) Alan Hinton, 1980–1982
- (England) Laurie Calloway, 1983
