= Dave Gillett =

Scottish footballer

Personal information
- Full name: David John Gillett
- Date of birth: 2 April 1951 (age 75)
- Place of birth: Edinburgh, Scotland
- Height: 6 ft 1 in (1.85 m)
- Position: Defender

Youth career
- Hibernian

Senior career*
Years	Team	Apps	(Gls)
1972–1975	Crewe Alexandra	69	(2)
1974	→ Seattle Sounders (loan)	20	(1)
1975–1980	Seattle Sounders	69	(3)
1975–1976	→ Caroline Hill (loan)		
- * Club domestic league appearances and goals

Dave Gillett (born 2 April 1951) is a Scottish retired football defender who spent most of his career in the North American Soccer League.

Gillett began his professional career with Hibernian and was transferred to Crewe Alexandra in August 1972. Crewe Alexandra sent him on loan in 1974 to the Seattle Sounders of the North American Soccer League. In 1975, the team sold his contract to the Sounders. Following the 1975 NASL season, he played on loan with Caroline Hills in the Hong Kong First Division League. In 1978, he broke his leg in the opening game of the NASL season. Although he remained on the Sounders' rosters through the 1980 season, he never played a first team game again. Gillett remained in the Seattle area after his retirement and coached at the amateur and youth levels including running summer camps and clinics for F.C. Seattle. He later served as the team's general manager until 1980.
