= Gordon Wallace (soccer) =

Scottish-Canadian soccer player

Personal information
- Date of birth: 6 January 1955 (age 71)
- Place of birth: Glasgow, Scotland
- Position: Striker

Senior career*
Years	Team	Apps	(Gls)
1973	Montreal Olympique	7	(1)
1974	Toronto Metros	3	(1)
	Montreal		(13)
1980–1981	Toronto Blizzard	12	(1)
1982	Hamilton Steelers		

International career
1973–1980	Canada	9	(0)
- * Club domestic league appearances and goals

Gordon Wallace (born 6 January 1955) is a retired Scottish-Canadian soccer player who played professionally in the North American Soccer League and earned nine caps with the Canadian men's national soccer team.

== National team ==
A forward, Wallace started in three games for Canada in the fall of 1973 in a friendlies away against Luxembourg and twice against Haiti. He played three more times in 1974 in friendlies played away against Bermuda, East Germany, and as a substitute against Poland. He did not play again until 1980 when he started in New Zealand, and came on as a substitute against Honduras and Guatemala. In his nine appearances he did not score any goals.

== Professional ==
Wallace played club soccer in the NASL for the Montreal Olympique in 1973, Toronto Metros in 1974. He subsequently played for the Toronto Blizzard in the summers of 1980 and 81. He also played for the Montreal Castors of the National Soccer League. In 1982, he returned to the National Soccer League to play with Hamilton Steelers where he assisted in securing the NSL Championship.

Son William Wallace soon to be Graduate of IT Tralee, Ireland.
