= Terry Garbett =

English footballer

Personal information
- Full name: Terry Graham Garbett
- Date of birth: 9 September 1945 (age 81)
- Place of birth: Lanchester, England
- Position: Midfielder

Senior career*
Years	Team	Apps	(Gls)
1965–1966	Middlesbrough	7	(1)
1966–1972	Watford	200	(46)
1972–1974	Blackburn Rovers	90	(6)
1974–1976	Sheffield United	31	(0)
1976–1979	New York Cosmos	66	(3)
- * Club domestic league appearances and goals

Terry Graham Garbett (born 9 September 1945) is an English retired footballer who played for Middlesbrough, Watford, Blackburn Rovers and Sheffield United in England, as well as the New York Cosmos in the United States.
