= Vito Dimitrijević =

Yugoslav footballer

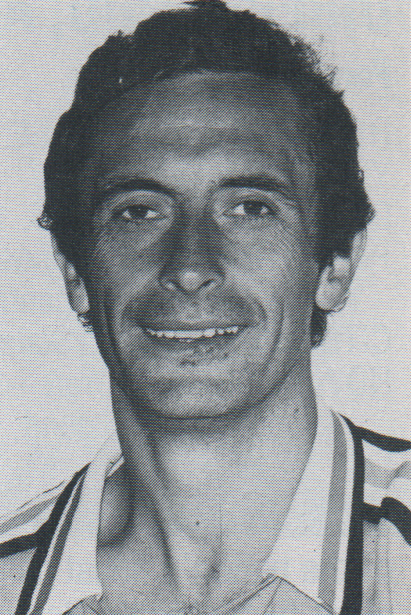
- Dimitrijević in 1979

Personal information
- Full name: Vitomir Dimitrijević
- Date of birth: 11 December 1948 (age 77)
- Place of birth: Surdulica, PR Serbia, FPR Yugoslavia
- Position: Midfielder

Senior career*
| Years | Team | Apps | (Gls) |
| 1968–1974 | Radnički Niš | 165 | (4) |
| 1975–1976 | Olimpija Ljubljana | 61 | (1) |
| 1977–1978 | New York Cosmos | 39 | (5) |
| 1979 | Los Angeles Aztecs | 20 | (0) |
| 1980–1981 | Svoboda Ljubljana | 34 | (2) |
| Total | | 319 | (12) |
- * Club domestic league appearances and goals

Vitomir Dimitrijević (born 11 December 1948) is a Serbian retired professional footballer who played as a midfielder. He spent three seasons in the North American Soccer League, making 59 appearances for the New York Cosmos and the Los Angeles Aztecs in the late 1970s.
