= Micky Cave =

English footballer (1949–1984)

Personal information
- Full name: Michael John Caves
- Date of birth: 28 January 1949
- Place of birth: Weymouth, England
- Date of death: 6 November 1984 (aged 35)
- Place of death: Aleppo, Pennsylvania, United States
- Height: 5 ft 8 in (1.73 m)
- Position: Midfielder

Senior career*
Years	Team	Apps	(Gls)
1966–1968	Weymouth	?	(?)
1968–1971	Torquay United	114	(17)
1971–1974	AFC Bournemouth	99	(17)
1972	→ Plymouth Argyle (loan)	8	(4)
1974–1977	York City	96	(13)
1976	→ Los Angeles Skyhawks (loan)	?	(?)
1977–1978	AFC Bournemouth	42	(3)
1977	→ Seattle Sounders (loan)	22	(12)
1978–1980	Seattle Sounders	53	(19)
1979–1980	Pittsburgh Spirit (indoor)	27	(24)
1980	Cleveland Cobras	?	(?)
1980–1981	Hartford Hellions (indoor)	38	(24)
1981–1983	Pittsburgh Spirit (indoor)	61	(22)
Total		560	(155)
- * Club domestic league appearances and goals

Michael John Cave (28 January 1949 – 6 November 1984) was an English footballer who played as a midfielder.

== Career ==
Born in Weymouth, Dorset, Cave was studying engineering when he started his career in non-League football with hometown club Weymouth in 1966. He joined Torquay United in July 1968, soon settling into the Plainmoor side. Although not a regular goalscorer (17 goals in 114 league games), when he did score they tended to be memorable. In July 1971 a fee of £15,000 took him to AFC Bournemouth. His first season at Dean Court was a struggle, and in March 1972 he joined Plymouth Argyle on loan. However, he returned to Bournemouth and eventually played 99 league games, scoring 17 goals, before a £18,000 transfer to York City in August 1974. His first season was York's first ever in the Second Division and they confounded expectations by surviving, although they were relegated the following season (with Cave winning the Clubman of the Year award). He spent the 1976 season on loan in the American Soccer League, helping the Los Angeles Skyhawks win the ASL title. In February 1977, after scoring 13 times in 96 league games for York, he returned to Bournemouth for a fee of £10,000. He spent the summer of 1977 on loan to North American Soccer League side Seattle Sounders, scoring 12 goals in 22 appearances, and joined Seattle permanently the following summer after playing the last of his 42 league games for Bournemouth, in which he had scored three times. He spent the 1978 and 1979 seasons in Seattle. He then played the 1979–80 indoor season with the Pittsburgh Spirit in the Major Indoor Soccer League, scoring 24 goals in 27 games. In 1980, he began the season with the Sounders, but played only one game before being released. He finished the season with the Cleveland Cobras of the ASL. He then joined the Hartford Hellions for the 1980–81 MISL season, in which he made 38 appearances and scored 24 goals, before finishing his career with two seasons back at the Pittsburgh Spirit.

Cave died in his home in Aleppo, Pennsylvania on 6 November 1984, aged 35, from accidental carbon monoxide poisoning (running his car in a garage). At the time he was assistant coach of the Pittsburgh Spirit of the MISL. He has since had the Player of the Year Award named after him in his honour at Bournemouth.
