= Giorgio Chinaglia =

Italian footballer (1947–2012)

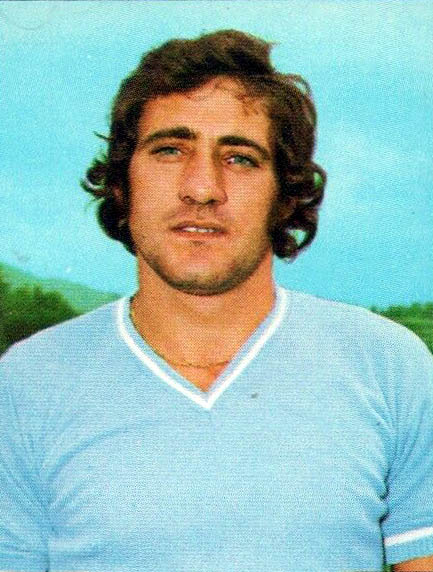
- Chinaglia with Lazio in 1975

Personal information
- Date of birth: 24 January 1947
- Place of birth: Carrara, Tuscany, Italy
- Date of death: 1 April 2012 (aged 65)
- Place of death: Naples, Florida, U.S.
- Height: 1.86 m (6 ft 1 in)
- Position: Striker

Youth career
- 1962–1964: Swansea Town

Senior career*
Years	Team	Apps	(Gls)
1964–1966	Swansea Town	6	(1)
1966–1967	Massese	32	(5)
1967–1969	Internapoli	66	(24)
1969–1976	Lazio	209	(98)
1976–1983	New York Cosmos	213	(193)
Total		525	(321)

International career
1972–1975	Italy	14	(4)
- * Club domestic league appearances and goals

Giorgio Chinaglia (Italian pronunciation: [ˈdʒordʒo kiˈnaʎʎa]; 24 January 1947 – 1 April 2012) was an Italian footballer who played as a striker. He grew up and played his early football in Cardiff, Wales, and began his career with Swansea Town in 1964. He later returned to Italy to play for Massese, Internapoli and Lazio in 1969. Chinaglia led Lazio to the club's first league championship in the 1973–74 season, during which he was also the league's leading scorer. He played international football for Italy, making 14 appearances and scoring 4 goals between 1972 and 1975, including two appearances at the 1974 FIFA World Cup. Chinaglia was the first player in Italian football history to be called up internationally from the second division.

In 1976, Chinaglia left Lazio to sign with the New York Cosmos of the North American Soccer League. With the Cosmos team that also featured Pelé and Franz Beckenbauer, Chinaglia won four league titles and retired in 1983 as the NASL's all-time leading goal scorer with 193 goals. In 1980, Chinaglia scored a record 50 goals in regular- and post-season play, plus another 26 in friendly matches. In all matches played, including friendly, exhibition and pre-season games, Chinaglia scored 734 goals, giving him a lifetime average of a goal a game.

In 2000, Chinaglia was inducted into the National Soccer Hall of Fame in the United States and was named the greatest player in Lazio's history during the club's centenary celebrations; with 29 goals, he is also the highest-scoring Lazio player in international competitions. A prolific goalscorer, some sources state that he is the highest scoring Italian player in all professional competitions, with 398 goals, ahead of Silvio Piola, although this claim is also disputed, as the NASL did not abide to certain FIFA regulations at the time. He is also the Italian player with the best goalscoring ratio in domestic championships, with 319 goals scored in 429 league matches played across both Italy and the United States.

Chinaglia was given the nickname "Long John", a reference to Chinaglia's physical style of play, as well as his resemblance to the similarly large Welsh footballing legend John Charles who also played in Italy and Wales.

== Early life ==
Chinaglia was born in Carrara, Tuscany, in 1947, but in 1955, he moved to Cardiff, Wales, with his father Mario, mother Giovanna and his sister Rita, because of unemployment in Italy following World War II. Because his family was poor, Chinaglia said, "All four of us lived in one room," he says, "My father was an ironworker and it was tough. I used to take the milk left on people's porches and drink it for breakfast." Chinaglia, whilst living in Cardiff, attended St Mary's of The Angels Catholic Primary School for an unknown period.

== Club career ==
=== Swansea ===
At age 13, Chinaglia was spotted scoring a hat trick for Cardiff Schools, and joined Swansea Town in the Football League Third Division as an apprentice in 1962.

Chinaglia made his senior debut for Swansea in October 1964 at Rotherham United, with his League debut following in February. His final Swans appearance was in March 1966, coming on as a substitute against Brentford.

With Swansea, Chinaglia won the 1965 West Wales Senior Cup, scoring in the 3–0 victory in the final against Llanelli, and represented the Swansea Senior Association Football League in 1964 in a representative match against the Birmingham & District Works Football Association.

=== Serie C ===
In 1966, because of the lack of interest from British clubs and his compulsory Italian military service, Chinaglia, then age 19, and his family moved back to Carrara. He credited the military requirement with getting his career on track, saying: "Otherwise, I'd probably still be in Wales, slogging it out in the mud and drinking ale. The Italian army has a special regiment for soccer players, so all I did in the service was to train all day, and when my club had a game, get a pass."

Chinaglia was banned from playing in Serie A, the top division, for three years because he had played professionally outside of Italy, and his father fixed him up with Massese, a Serie C club in Massa near his home.

The following season, he joined another Serie C club, Internapoli in Naples, where he played two seasons and scored 26 goals in 66 matches.

=== Lazio ===
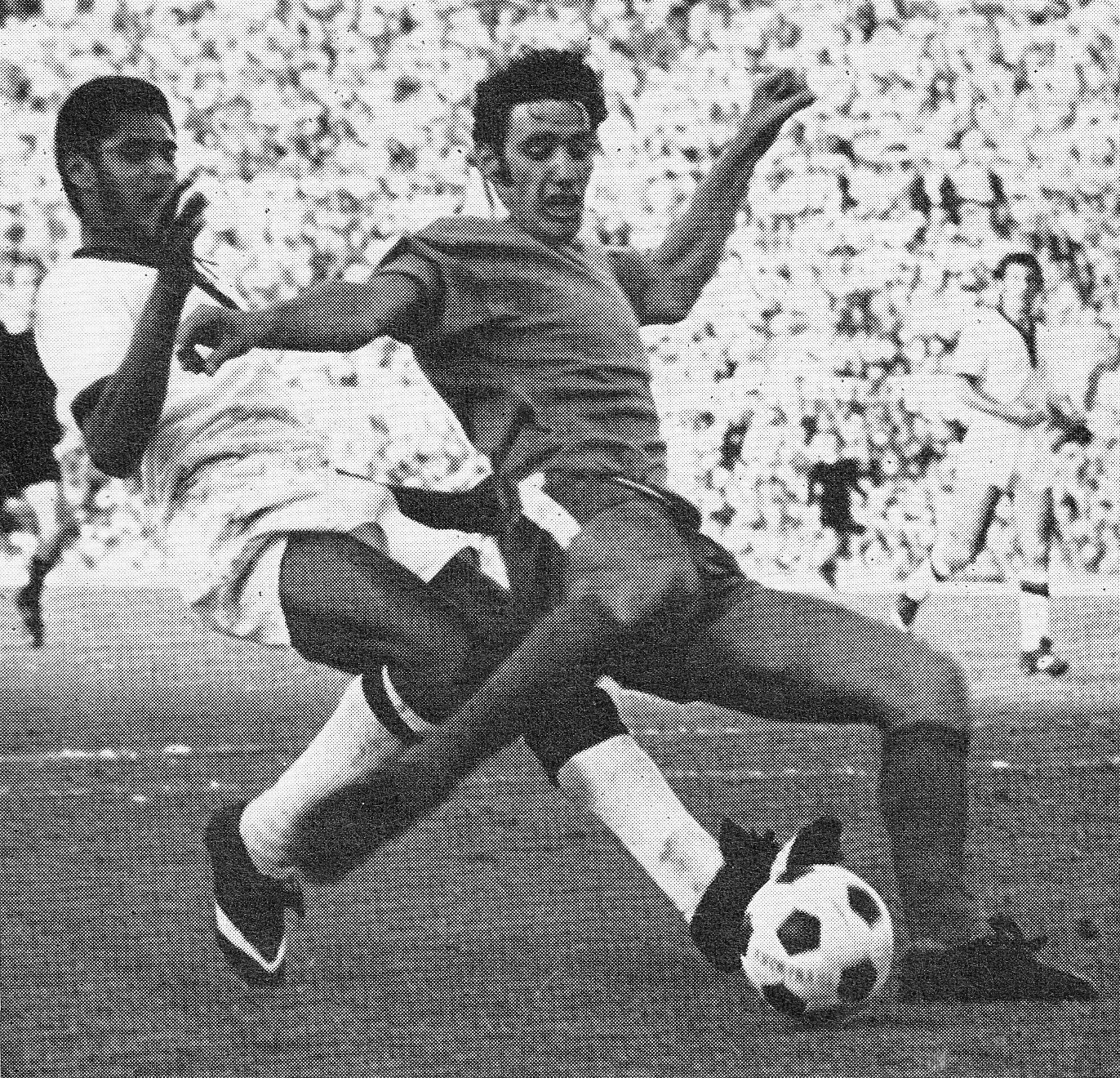
Chinaglia playing for Biancocelesti, opposed by Nené of Cagliari, c. 1970

Chinaglia rose to fame as a prolific goalscorer in Italy's Serie A, playing for Lazio, scoring 12 goals in his debut Serie A season, including a notable goal against European Cup holders Milan, led by Gianni Rivera. He scored nine goals in his second season, which was insufficient to prevent Lazio from being relegated to Serie B the following season. Despite Lazio's poor league form that year, Chinaglia won the Coppa delle Alpi with Lazio in 1971, defeating Basel 3–1 in the final. He helped Lazio to gain promotion to Serie A during the following season, leading the club to a second-place finish in Serie B that year, and finishing the season as the leading goalscorer in Serie B, with 21 goals. The following season, Chinaglia scored 10 goals in Serie A, as Lazio narrowly missed out on the title, losing it to Juventus on the final matchday. During the 1973–74 season, he led the top Italian league in scoring, with 24 goals, and he helped his team to the Serie A title that year, scoring the decisive goal from a penalty in a 1–0 win over Foggia. He was named the club's captain during his final season in Italy, concluding his European career with 14 goals. In total, he scored 98 league goals for Lazio in 209 appearances, 77 of which were scored in Serie A, in 175 appearances. He scored 122 goals in 246 appearances in all competitions for Lazio, scoring 13 goals in 28 Coppa Italia appearances, and nine goals in 11 European matches.

=== New York Cosmos ===
In Rome, Chinaglia's family faced abuse from opposing fans and threats of kidnapping by terrorist groups, and he voiced frustration at Italian tax and corporate laws that he said led to business failures. In 1972, Chinaglia began investing in American real estate while on a tour of the United States with Lazio. And in 1975, his family bought a house in Englewood, New Jersey with the idea that he would commute to matches from there. Instead, he walked into the office of Clive Toye, then president of the New York Cosmos of the NASL, and said he would either play for the Cosmos or buy his own team.

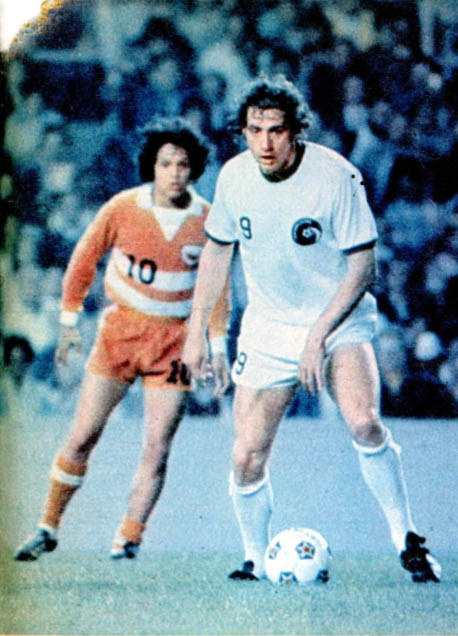
Chinaglia during his first year in NY Cosmos

Chinaglia joined the Cosmos in 1976 and finished his career in New York with 397 goals in outdoor games and 38 goals in 21 indoor, a total of 435 goals in 413 matches. He led his team in scoring for 13 straight seasons, six at Lazio and seven at the Cosmos, scored two or more goals 54 times for the Cosmos, of which 14 were playoff games, scored three or more goals in a game 16 times, five in the playoffs, and scored seven goals in a playoff game against the Tulsa Roughnecks in 1980 as well as seven goals in an indoor game against the Chicago Sting on 8 December 1981. Chinaglia won the NASL Most Valuable Player Award in 1981.

Chinaglia scored 49 goals in 41 playoff games for the Cosmos for his career and scored five goals in five Soccer Bowls, three of which were game winners (1977, 1978, and 1982).

In 1980, Chinaglia scored 76 goals in 66 total matches, including 32 goals in 32 regular-season games and 18 goals in seven playoff games. The NASL regular-season record for most goals is also held by Chinaglia with 34 goals in 1978.

In December 1981, Chinaglia played indoor soccer, and in his first game against the Chicago Sting, he set an individual all-time NASL indoor record for most goals in a single match by scoring seven.

He was also an associate with Warner Brothers president Steve Ross, part-owner of the franchise, and frequently attended events in New York.

In 1984, Cosmos, facing mounting losses and having never turned a profit, sold 60 per cent of the club's ownership to Chinaglia, with no money exchanging hands. Chinaglia, at that time Lazio's president, handed the controls to his personal assistant and general manager Peppe Pinton. When the league and the club folded in 1986, Pinton ended up retaining the rights to the Cosmos name and memorabilia, including trophies and playing gear, associated with the club.

In 2000, he was inducted into the National Soccer Hall of Fame.

In 2009, Pinton sold the Cosmos name to new owners, and in 2014 the new Cosmos team retired Chinaglia's n° 9 jersey. The ceremony was held before a match, with the three children from his first marriage in attendance.

== International career ==
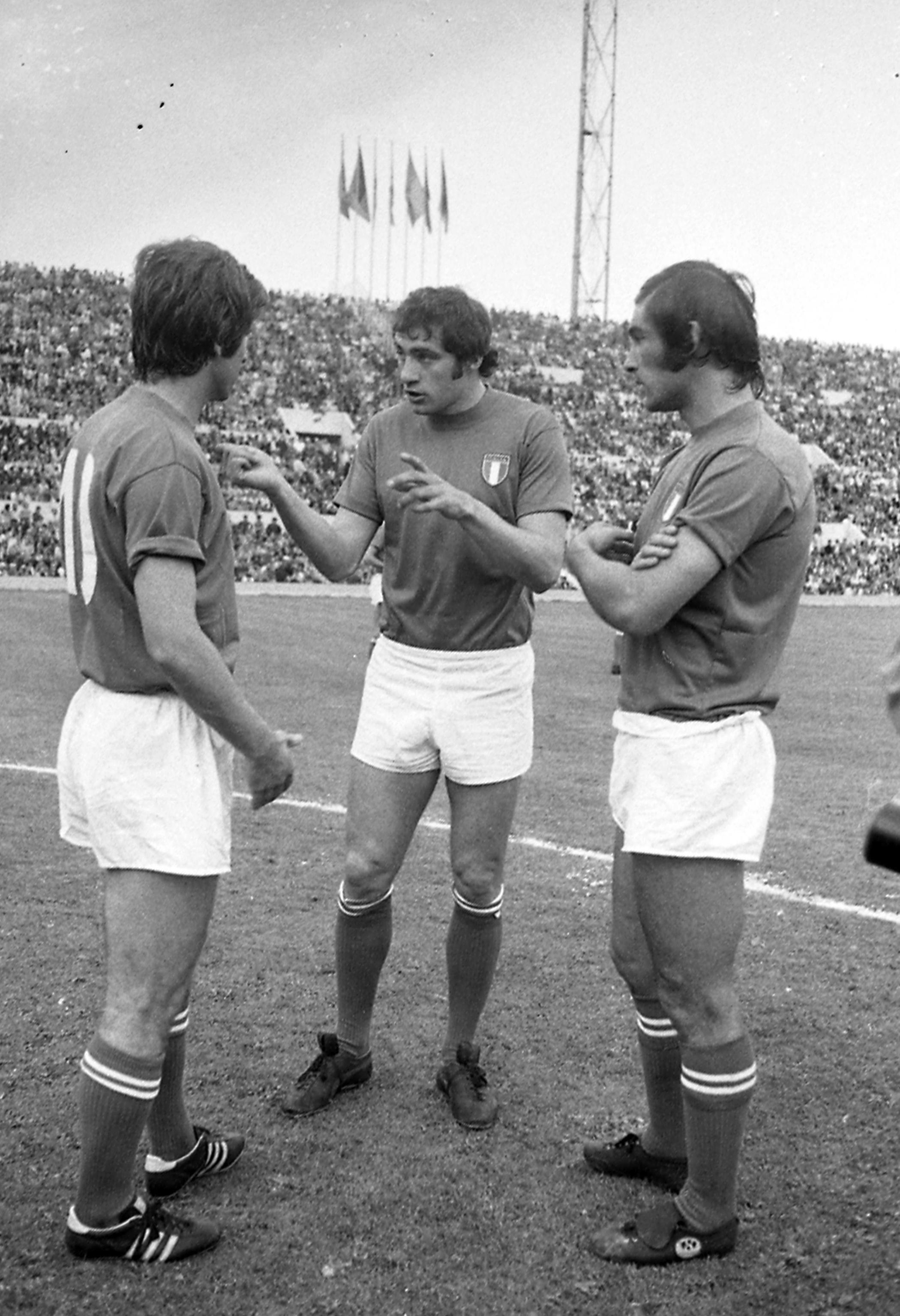
Rivera, Chinaglia and Pulici with the Italy national team in 1973

Chinaglia's play with Lazio earned him a place on head coach Ferruccio Valcareggi's shortlist for the Italy squad in the 1970 FIFA World Cup. He did not make the final 22-man squad, but Valcareggi took him to Mexico for experience. Italy reached the final of the tournament.

In 1971, after Lazio were demoted to Serie B, Chinaglia became the first Italy national team player in modern history to be selected from a second-tier division club. Chinaglia scored on his debut in a friendly match against Bulgaria, on 21 June 1972, in Sofia.

In 1973, Chinaglia returned to Britain with the Azzurri to face England in a friendly match. In the 86th minute, Chinaglia beat English defender Bobby Moore and sent in a cross that was tapped in by Fabio Capello, helping Italy to its first win over England at Wembley Stadium.

Along with his teammates Re Cecconi and Wilson, Chinaglia took part in the 1974 FIFA World Cup in Germany, although he was scarcely used by Italy manager Ferruccio Valcareggi. Chinaglia became notoriously famous for his strong verbal reaction when he cursed upon being substituted by Valcareggi for Anastasi during his nation's opening match of the tournament against Haïti, which ended in a 3–1 victory to the Italians, although they would later suffer a first round elimination from the competition. With his successor, Fulvio Bernardini, the situation did not improve. In total, he scored 4 goals for Italy in 14 appearances between 1972 and 1975.

== Style of play ==
Chinaglia was a large, strong, fast, and powerful player with a keen eye for goal. He is regarded as one of the most prolific Italian strikers of all time. His opportunistic style of play was initially seen as unorthodox, but he developed into a prominent goalscorer, often described as one of the first true old fashioned centre-forwards in Italy. Chinaglia was known for his powerful and accurate shot, heading ability, and clinical finishing, both inside and outside the area, as well as his acrobatic ability in the air. Although he was not initially regarded as a highly gifted player, he developed his skill and control with time, showing great technical improvements later on in his career, leading him to dribble with the ball at speed during counterattacks on occasion. He was also an accurate penalty taker.

Look at me. I am Giorgio Chinaglia. I beat you!

— Giorgio Chinaglia.

In addition to his footballing attributes, Chinaglia was a confident, charismatic and highly influential player on the pitch, due to his flamboyant, outspoken, eccentric, and extroverted personality, as well as his unique sense of humour with his teammates, which led him to become one of the first true footballing stars. He was also known for his leadership throughout his career, in particular during his time at Lazio. However, despite his prolific goalscoring record, he was criticised at times for being selfish, arrogant, and for his limited work-rate off the ball. Although he was popular with fans and teammates, he also had a controversial, brash, and rebellious character, and an aggressive temper at times, which led to arguments and altercations with some of his managers and teammates throughout his career. He also drew negative attention to himself in the press due to his lifestyle off the pitch, which included certain legal problems throughout his career, as well as accusations of criminal activity.

== Personal life ==
In 1970, Chinaglia married his first wife, Connie Eruzione, daughter of a retired American army sergeant who was living in Italy and cousin of Mike Eruzione, member of the gold medal-winning 1980 United States men's national ice hockey team that won the "Miracle on Ice" game against the Soviet Union. They had three children together: Cynthia, Giorgio Jr. and Stephanie. After his divorce with his first wife, Chinaglia married Angela Cacioppo; they had two children: Anthony and Donald.

In 1979, Chinaglia became a naturalized American citizen, telling The New York Times Magazine reporter Diane Ackerman that he proudly kept his citizenship papers in his locker next to his bottle of Chivas Regal.

In 1996, Chinaglia was given a two-year prison sentence for fraudulent and false bankruptcy in the financial statements attributable to the management of Fin Lazio (1986–87), the financial owner of Lazio. He was Lazio's club president from 1983 to 1985, and was investigated by Italian authorities over a failed attempt to buy the club in 2006 over money laundering allegations involving suspected associates of the Casalesi clan, a clan of the Camorra crime syndicate. He had previously attempted to buy another Italian club, Foggia, in 2004, but that attempt also failed after money laundering allegations and he fled to the United States. In October 2006, Chinaglia was also accused of extortion and manipulation and an arrest warrant was issued by the Guardia di Finanza, but he remained a fugitive due to him residing in the United States. In November 2007, Chinaglia was fined €4.2 million by the Commissione Nazionale per le Società e la Borsa for the alleged intention of a Hungarian chemical-pharmaceutical group to acquire the majority stake in S.S. Lazio. In July 2008, another arrest warrant was issued to Chinaglia. Football Show co-host Charlie Stillitano said Chinaglia never returned to Italy because "he never wanted to take the chance".

At the time of his death, Chinaglia was co-host of a daily football talk show, The Football Show on Sirius Satellite Radio.

Chinaglia died in Naples, Florida of a heart attack on 1 April 2012. His body was brought back to Rome for burial at Cimitero Flaminio, in the chapel of the Maestrelli family, where former Lazio coach Tommaso Maestrelli is buried. The Giorgio Chinaglia Foundation, a non-profit organisation to help youth football programmes and disabled children, was later formed by the three children from his first marriage.

== Honours ==
Lazio

- Serie A: 1973–74
- Coppa delle Alpi: 1971

New York Cosmos

- North American Soccer League Soccer Bowl: 1977, 1978, 1980, 1982
- NASL Atlantic/National Conference: 1977, 1978, 1980, 1981, 1982
- NASL Regular Season: 1978, 1979, 1980, 1981, 1982
- NASL Eastern Division: 1978, 1979, 1980, 1981, 1982

Individual

- Serie A top scorer: 1973–74
- Serie B top scorer: 1971–72
- Coppa delle Alpi top scorer: 1971
- NASL top scorer: 1978, 1979, 1980, 1981
- NASL MVP: 1981
- Soccer Bowl MVP: 1980, 1982
- NASL All-Stars: First-team: 1976, 1978, 1979, 1980 1981 1982 Second-team: 1983; Honorable mention: 1977
- N° 9 jersey retired by the Cosmos

== Bibliography ==
- Arrivederci Swansea: The Giorgio Chinaglia Story (by Mario Risoli, Mainstream Publishing).
