= 1978 NASL Schlitz Indoor Tournament =

Indoor soccer tournament

North American Soccer League -1978 Schlitz Indoor Soccer Tournament-
Schlitz Professional Indoor Tournament

Tournament details
- Dates: March 14, 1978 – March 15, 1978
- Teams: 4

Final positions
- Champions: Dallas Tornado (2nd title)
- Runners-up: Houston Hurricane

Tournament statistics
- Matches played: 4
- Goals scored: 63 (15.75 per match)
- Attendance: 8,557 (2,139 per match)
- Top scorer(s): (England) Peter Anderson (6 goals) (Finland) Kai Haaskivi
- Best player: (England) Mark Lindsay

The 1978 NASL Schlitz Indoor Soccer Tournament was a four-team indoor soccer tournament held in Houston, Texas, at The Summit in mid-March 1978.

== Overview ==
Four teams, all from the North American Soccer League, participated in the two-day event: the Dallas Tornado, the Los Angeles Aztecs, the San Diego Sockers, and the host Houston Hurricane, who were an expansion team.

Much like ice hockey, matches were 60 minutes long and divided into three 20-minute periods with an intermission between each period. And just as in hockey, it allowed for free substitutions, and power plays on a playing surface measuring 200 feet by 85 feet. The goal dimensions were 4 feet by 16 feet. Standings were tabulated as follows; three points for a victory, plus a bonus point for each goal scored in a victory, no points or bonus points earned in a loss. Each session consisted of two games (i.e. a doubleheader). The opening round of matches (Tuesday evening's Session 1) would feature a pair of Texas vs California match-ups, with the Session 2 matches having the opposite Texas vs California pairings the following evening. The second game of Session 1, marked Houston’s first ever appearance before their home fans, having first faced NASL competition just 10 days earlier in Tulsa at the Skelly Indoor Invitational. That same match marked San Diego's first ever appearance as the Sockers, having played the 1977 season as the Las Vegas Quicksilvers and the 1976 season as the San Diego Jaws.

A total of 8,557 people attended the two sessions. Houston was the only squad to win both of its matches, but Dallas, with 21 points, was crowned champions because of the unusual point awarding system. The Hurricane were runners-up in the invitational with 20 points. San Diego finished in third position with 13 points, while winless Los Angeles was last with zero points. The tournament's MVPs was Mark Lindsay who had scored five goals in one match for Houston. San Diego forward Peter Anderson and Dallas’ Kai Haaskivi led the tournament with 6 goals apiece.

== Map of clubs ==
NASL Schlitz Indoor Tournament Clubs

=== Sessions ===
Session 1: Tuesday, March 14, 1978

7:00 PM CST	Dallas Tornado	18–7	Los Angeles Aztecs	Attendance: 3,930

9:00 PM CST	Houston Hurricane	10–5	San Diego Sockers

Session 2: Wednesday, March 15, 1978

7:00 PM CST	Houston Hurricane	4–3	Los Angeles Aztecs	Attendance: 4,620

9:00 PM CST	San Diego Sockers	10–6	Dallas Tornado

=== Match reports ===
==== Session 1 ====
March 14, 1978 Match 1	Dallas Tornado	18–7	Los Angeles Aztecs	Houston, Texas
7:00 PM	Haaskivi,,,, Rote,, Garcia, Kewley, Bourne,		Best,, (red card) (o.g.)	Stadium: The Summit; Attendance: 3,930

March 14, 1978 Match 2	Houston Hurricane	10–5	San Diego Sockers	Houston, Texas
9:00 PM	Lindsay,,,, Jump, Orhan, Russell		Anderson, Wark; Veee; Lindsay (o.g.)	Stadium: The Summit; Attendance: 3,930

==== Session 2 ====
March 15, 1978 Match	Houston Hurricane	4–3	Los Angeles Aztecs	Houston, Texas
7:00 PM	Anderson 4:05'; O'Sullivan 7:36'; Megaloudis 11:28'; Megaloudis 27:29'		Best; Sühnholz 30:53'; Mifflin	Stadium: The Summit; Attendance: 4,627

March 15, 1978 Match 2	San Diego Sockers	10–6	Dallas Tornado	Houston, Texas
9:00 PM	Anderson,,, Veee, Bachner; Milone; Wark; Harsányi		Garcia,, Kewley; Haaskivi; Ryan	Stadium: The Summit; Attendance: 4,627

== Final standings ==
G = Games, W = Wins, L = Losses, GF = Goals For, GA = Goals Against, GD = Goal Differential, PTS = *Point System

1978 Schlitz Professional Indoor Soccer Tournament
Team	G	W	L	GF	GA	GD	PTS	Position
Dallas Tornado	2	1	1	24	17	+7	21	1st place (champions)
Houston Hurricane	2	2	0	14	8	+6	20	2nd place (runners-up)
San Diego Sockers	2	1	1	15	16	–1	13	3rd place
Los Angeles Aztecs	2	0	2	10	22	–12	0	4th place

*3 points for a win, 0 points for a loss, 1 bonus point for each goal scored in a victory

== Statistical leaders ==
=== Scoring ===
Leading scorers	Team	Goals*
(England) Peter Anderson	San Diego	6
(Finland) Kai Haaskivi	Dallas	6
(England) Mark Lindsay	Houston	5
(Mexico) Freddie Garcia	Dallas	5
(United States) Juli Veee	San Diego	3
(United States) Kyle Rote Jr.	Dallas	3
(Northern Ireland) George Best	Los Angeles	3
(England) Kevin Kewley	Dallas	3

*Five players tied with 2 goals

== Tournament awards ==
- Most Valuable Player: (England) Mark Lindsay (Houston)

== Non-tournament matches ==
There were many other NASL indoor matches played that winter, including the four-team 1978 NASL Skelly Indoor Invitational in which Houston also participated. Indeed, the Tampa Bay Rowdies scheduled nine games against various teams including Washington, Tulsa, Minnesota, and Rochester. At that time clubs were allowed to do their own scheduling because a fully sanctioned indoor season would not come to be in the NASL until November 1979. Although it never materialized, there was talk of the league awarding the "NASL Cup" for the best team among those that played indoor in early 1978. Ultimately only a handful of NASL squads played more than three times. Meanwhile competition arrived from another league later that same year, as on December 22, 1978 the Major Indoor Soccer League was launched.

== See also ==
- North American Soccer League
