= 1978–79 Major Indoor Soccer League season =

Major Indoor Soccer League
- Season: 1978–79
- Champions: New York Arrows
- Matches: 72
- Goals: 863 (11.99 per match)
- Top goalscorer: (United States) Fred Grgurev (46 goals)
- Average attendance: 4,282

The 1978–79 Major Indoor Soccer League season was the first in league history and would end with the New York Arrows winning the first MISL title.

== Recap ==
The league would begin with six teams and a 24-game schedule beginning in December 1978 and ending in March 1979. The top four teams would advance to a single-game semifinal and a best of three championship series. League attendance would average 4,453 per game.

Signs were good that the league would have a long-time presence. The early games drew strong crowds, as Philadelphia sold out the Spectrum for their opener, leading the league in attendance. The first expansion team was announced on December 13, nine days before the first game in league history, as the Buffalo Stallions were slated to start play in the 1979-80 season. 10,386 fans were in the Nassau Coliseum to see the Cincinnati Kids play the Arrows in the league's first game.

Despite finishing in a solid third place, Cincinnati folded after the season.

== Teams ==
Team	City/Area	Arena
Cincinnati Kids	Cincinnati	Riverfront Coliseum
Cleveland Force	Cleveland	Richfield Coliseum
Houston Summit	Houston	The Summit
New York Arrows	Uniondale, New York	Nassau Veterans Memorial Coliseum
Philadelphia Fever	Philadelphia	The Spectrum
Pittsburgh Spirit	Pittsburgh	Civic Arena (Pittsburgh)

== Map of clubs ==
1978-79 Major Indoor Soccer League clubs

== Regular season ==
=== Schedule ===
The 1978–79 regular season schedule ran from December 22, 1978, to March 18, 1979. Each team played a schedule of 24 games.

=== Final standings ===
Playoff teams in bold.

	W	L	Pct.	GB	GF	GA	Home	Road
**Houston Summit**	18	6	.750	--	175	114	11-1	7-5
**New York Arrows**	16	8	.667	2	176	136	8-4	8-4
**Cincinnati Kids**	16	8	.667	2	154	129	10-2	6-6
**Philadelphia Fever**	11	13	.458	7	141	154	5-7	6-6
Pittsburgh Spirit	6	18	.250	12	123	171	4-8	2-10
Cleveland Force	5	19	.208	13	94	159	4-8	1-11

=== Team attendance ===
Club	Games	Total	Average
Philadelphia Fever	12	90,176	7,515
New York Arrows	12	65,350	5,446
Houston Summit	12	43,472	3,623
Cincinnati Kids	12	38,287	3,191
Cleveland Force	12	37,393	3,116
Pittsburgh Spirit	12	33,206	2,801
**OVERALL**	**72**	**308,284**	**4,282**

=== Regular season statistics ===
==== Scoring leaders ====
GP = Games played, G = Goals, A = Assists, Pts = Points

Player	Team	GP	G	A	Pts
(United States) Fred Grgurev	Philadelphia Fever	24	46	28	74
(Socialist Federal Republic of Yugoslavia) Steve Zungul	New York Arrows	18	43	25	68
(Finland) Kai Haaskivi	Houston Summit	22	39	25	64
(Canada) Branko Segota	New York Arrows	21	25	22	47
(United States) Doug Wark	Cincinnati Kids	22	29	16	45
(United States) Joey Fink	Philadelphia Fever	22	30	14	44
(Scotland) Ian Anderson	Houston Summit	21	29	13	42
(England) Stewart Jump	Houston Summit	21	21	18	39
(United States) John Stremlau	Houston Summit	24	16	21	37
(United States) Alberto Alves	Philadelphia Fever	24	20	16	36

==== Goalkeeping leaders ====
Note: GP = Games played; Min = Minutes played; GA = Goals against; GAA = Goals against average; W = Wins; L = Losses

Player	Team	GP	Min	GA	GAA	W	L
(England) Paul Hammond	Houston Summit	17	1010	70	4.16	13	3
(United States) Keith Van Eron	Cincinnati Kids	23	1237	104	5.04	15	7
(United States) Shep Messing	New York Arrows	22	1236	107	5.19	14	7
(United States) Woody Hartman	Philadelphia Fever	22	1237	120	5.82	10	10
(Trinidad and Tobago) Roland Skinner	Houston Summit	8	453	44	5.83	5	3
(United States) Jim May	Cleveland Force	12	529	53	6.01	1	6
(United States) Peter Mannos	Pittsburgh Spirit	16	880	159	3.02	5	9
(United States) Rich Brands	Cleveland Force	13	533	71	7.99	1	8

== Playoffs ==
=== Bracket ===
Semifinals; Single match
1	Houston	3
4	Philadelphia	6
2	New York	9
3	Cincinnati	4

Championship series Best-of-three
4	Philadelphia	0
2	New York	2

=== Semifinals ===
March 11	Houston Summit	3–6	Philadelphia Fever	The Summit • 4,683

March 13	New York Arrows	9–4	Cincinnati Kids	Nassau Coliseum • 4,411

=== Championship Series ===
Higher seed		Lower seed	Game 1	Game 2	Game 3
New York Arrows	-	Philadelphia Fever	14–7	9–5	x	March 23 • Nassau Coliseum • 8,640; March 25 • The Spectrum • 6,096

=== Playoff statistics ===
==== Playoff scoring ====
GP = Games played, G = Goals, A = Assists, Pts = Points

Player	Team	GP	G	A	Pts
(Socialist Federal Republic of Yugoslavia) Steve Zungul	New York Arrows	3	15	4	19
(Canada) Branko Segota	New York Arrows	3	7	3	10
(Canada) Pat Ercoli	New York Arrows	3	1	7	8
(United States) Alberto Alves	Philadelphia Fever	3	2	5	7
(Argentina) Luis Alberto	New York Arrows	3	1	5	6

==== Playoff goalkeeping ====
Note: GP = Games played; Min = Minutes played; GA = Goals against; GAA = Goals against average; W = Wins; L = Losses

Player	Team	GP	Min	GA	GAA	W	L
(Scotland) Ian Anderson	Houston Summit	1	1	0	0.00	0	0
(United States) Shep Messing	New York Arrows	3	170	15	5.30	3	0
(Canada) Enzo DiPede	New York Arrows	2	10	1	5.88	0	0
(England) Paul Hammond	Houston Summit	1	59	6	6.12	0	1
(United States) Woody Hartman	Philadelphia Fever	2	93	10	6.45	1	1

== League awards ==
- Most Valuable Player: (Socialist Federal Republic of Yugoslavia) Steve Zungul, New York
- Scoring Champion: (United States) Fred Grgurev, Philadelphia
- Pass Master: (United States) Fred Grgurev, Philadelphia
- Goalkeeper of the Year: (England) Paul Hammond, Houston
- Coach of the Year: (Finland) Timo Liekoski, Houston
- Championship Series Most Valuable Player: (United States) Shep Messing, New York

=== All-MISL team ===
First Team	Position	Second Team
(United States) Shep Messing, New York	G	(England) Paul Hammond, Houston
(United States) Fred Grgurev, Philadelphia	D	(United States) Ty Keough, Cincinnati
(Scotland) Ian Anderson, Houston	D	(United States) Tom Mulroy, Pittsburgh (United States) Alan Hamlyn, Cleveland
(United States) Doug Wark, Cincinnati	M	(United States) Joey Fink, Philadelphia
(Finland) Kai Haaskivi, Houston	F	(England) Stewart Jump, Houston
(Socialist Federal Republic of Yugoslavia) Steve Zungul, New York	F	(United States) Jim Pollihan, New York
