= 1978 NASL Skelly Indoor Invitational =

Indoor soccer tournament

North American Soccer League -1978 Skelly Invitational-
Skelly Indoor Invitational

Tournament details
- Dates: March 4, 1978 – March 5, 1978
- Teams: 4

Final positions
- Champions: Tulsa Roughnecks (1st title)
- Runners-up: Minnesota Kicks

Tournament statistics
- Matches played: 4
- Goals scored: 57 (14.25 per match)
- Attendance: 3,500 (875 per match)
- Top scorer(s): (Socialist Federal Republic of Yugoslavia) Nino Zec (5 goals) (United States) Randy Garber (Socialist Federal Republic of Yugoslavia) Milan Dovedan
- Best player(s): (Socialist Federal Republic of Yugoslavia) Nino Zec (Hungary) Tibor Molnár

The 1978 NASL Skelly Invitational was a four-team indoor soccer tournament held in Tulsa, Oklahoma, at the Tulsa Assembly Center on the first weekend of March 1978.

== Overview ==
Four teams, all from the North American Soccer League, participated in the two-day event: the Houston Hurricane, the Minnesota Kicks, the Washington Diplomats, and the host Tulsa Roughnecks.

Matches were 60 minutes long and divided into three 20-minute periods, with an intermission between each period. Timed overtime periods, featuring a golden goal winner, would be used to decide any matches tied after 60 minutes. Each session consisted of two games (i.e. a doubleheader). The opening round of matches (Saturday evening's Session 1) would be semi-final games, with the Session 2 matches on Sunday afternoon serving as the third place match and Championship Final respectively. The first match of Session 1 was Minnesota's first time playing indoors. The second match of Session 1, played on Saturday, March 4, 1978, between Tulsa and Houston, marked the first time the expansion Hurricane faced NASL competition, and was only the Roughnecks third-ever game.

Approximately 3,500 people attended the two sessions. Tulsa won both of its matches and was crowned champions of the Skelly Invitational. Roughnecks forward Nino Zec edged out both teammate Milan Dovedan and Washington's Randy Garber by one assist to lead the invitational in scoring with 5 goals and 2 assists. The tournament's co-MVPs were Zec and Tibor Molnár, also of Tulsa. The Kicks were runners-up in the invitational, with the Dips defeating the Hurricane for 3rd place in the consolation match. The all-tournament squad included four Roughnecks: Zec, Molnar, Dovedan, and goalkeeper, Gary Allison.

== Map of clubs ==
NASL Skelly Indoor Invitational Clubs

== Tournament results ==
=== Bracket ===
Opening round
Tulsa Roughnecks	12
Houston Hurricane	3
Minnesota Kicks	8(OT)
Washington Diplomats	7

Championship Final
Tulsa Roughnecks	9
Minnesota Kicks	5
Third place
Washington Diplomats	8
Houston Hurricane	5

=== Sessions ===
Session 1: Saturday, March 4, 1978

7:00 PM CST	Minnesota Kicks	8–7 (OT)	Washington Diplomats	Attendance: 1,500 (est)

9:00 PM CST	Tulsa Roughnecks	12–3	Houston Hurricane

Session 2: Sunday, March 5, 1978

2:30 PM CST	Washington Diplomats	8–5	Houston Hurricane	Attendance: 2,000 (est)

4:30 PM CST	Tulsa Roughnecks	9–5	Minnesota Kicks

=== Match reports ===
==== Session 1 ====
March 4, 1978 Game 1	Minnesota Kicks	8–7(OT)	Washington Diplomats	Tulsa, Oklahoma
7:00 PM CST	Bailey (7:55); Romero (12:59); Want (18:44); Willey (23:59); Twellman (25:03); Coker (26:23); Moran (35:25); Bailey 62:46' (Villa)		Bakić (34:47); Garber (37:08); Garber (41:51); Garber (50:45); Mokgojoa (52:14); Steele (56:57); Garber (57:43)	Stadium: Tulsa Assembly Center; Attendance: 1,500 (est)

March 4, 1978 Game 2	Tulsa Roughnecks	12–3	Houston Hurricane	Tulsa, Oklahoma
9:00 PM CST	Stamenkovic (3:13); Zec (14:41); Zec (15:17); Dovedon (24:26); Zec (28:09); Dovedon (36:36); Dovedon (40:31); Dovedon (42:39); O'Riordan (43:26); McKeown (47:43); Dangerfield (49:05); Molnár (54:31)		O'Sullivan (25:00); Voccaro (33:32); Morielli (35:07)	Stadium: Tulsa Assembly Center; Attendance: 1,500 (est)

==== Session 2 ====
March 5, 1978 3rd Place	Washington Diplomats	8–5	Houston Hurricane	Tulsa, Oklahoma
2:30 PM (CST)	Bakić (4:05); Cannell (7:36); Bakić (11:28); Maseko (27:29); Mokgojoa (28:03); Garber (31:15); Steele (31:35); Bakić (51:48)		Morielli (3:22); Russell (6:14); Russell (30:53); Voccaro (45:13); O'Sullivan (55:43)	Stadium: Tulsa Assembly Center; Attendance: 2,000 (est)

March 5, 1978 Championship	Tulsa Roughnecks	9–5	Minnesota Kicks	Tulsa, Oklahoma
4:30 PM (CST)	Stamenkovic (3:51); O'Riordan (4:23); Collins (9:01); Dovedon (27:06); Gazonas (33:27); Waldron (38:33); Zec (47:43); Stamenkovic (58:08); Zec (58:36)		Coker (2:14); Coker (12:35); Moran (29:29); Coker (56:52); Willey (58:22)	Stadium: Tulsa Assembly Center; Attendance: 2,000 (est)

== Final standings ==
G = Games, W = Wins, L = Losses, GF = Goals For, GA = Goals Against, GD = Goal Differential

1978 Skelly Indoor Invitational
Team	G	W	L	GF	GA	GD	Position
Tulsa Roughnecks	2	2	0	21	8	+13	1st place (champions)
Minnesota Kicks	2	1	1	13	16	–3	2nd place (runners-up)
Washington Diplomats	2	1	1	15	13	+2	3rd place
Houston Hurricane	2	0	2	8	20	–12	4th place

== Statistical leaders ==
=== Scoring ===
Goals (worth 2 points), Assists (worth 1 point)

Leading scorers	Goals	Assists	Points
(Socialist Federal Republic of Yugoslavia) Nino Zec (Tulsa)	5	2	12
(United States) Randy Garber (Washington)	5	1	11
(United States) Milan Dovedan (Tulsa)	5	1	11
(Canada) Mike Bakić (Washington)	4	0	8
(United States) Ade Coker (Minnesota)	4	0	8
(Socialist Federal Republic of Yugoslavia) Živorad Stamenković (Tulsa)	3	2	8
(United States) Mark Moran (Minnesota)	2	1	5
(Italy) Gerry Morielli (Houston)	2	1	5
(Republic of Ireland) Don O'Riordan (Tulsa)	2	1	5
(United States) Matt O'Sullivan (Houston)	2	1	5
(Scotland) Jim Steele (Washington)	2	1	5

*Three players tied with 2 goals 0 assists.

=== Goalkeeping ===
GA = Goals Against, GAA = Goals Against Average, SV = Saves, SF = Shots Faced

Leading Goalkeepers	Minutes	GA	GAA	SV	SF
(Canada) Darryl Wallace (Tulsa)	60	3	3.00	25	30
(Germany) Gary Allison (Tulsa)	60	5	5.00	unk	unk
(Northern Ireland) Bill Irwin (Washington)	60	5	5.00	19	24
(United States) Kurt Kuykendall (Washington)	63	8	7.875	unk	unk

*Minnesota and Houston used multiple goalkeepers in each match.

== Tournament awards ==
- Most Valuable Players: (Socialist Federal Republic of Yugoslavia) Nino Zec (Tulsa) and (Hungary) Tibor Molnár (Tulsa)
- All-tournament Team: (Socialist Federal Republic of Yugoslavia) Nino Zec (Tulsa), (United States) Milan Dovedan (Tulsa), (United States) Randy Garber (Washington), (Hungary) Tibor Molnar (Tulsa), (United States) Dale Russell (Houston), (Germany) Gary Allison (Tulsa)

== Non-tournament matches ==
These were not the only indoor matches played that winter. The four Skelly Invitational participants played a combined 12 additional matches. In fact 10 days later, Houston hosted their own indoor tournament, the Schlitz Indoor Touney. Since a full season of indoor soccer was still two years away, NASL teams were free to do their own scheduling. There were reports of the league awarding an "NASL Cup" for the best team among those that participated in at least 16 indoor games. Of the 24 teams in the league, 11 had indoor matches planned. The Tampa Bay Rowdies, for example played eight games. By contrast, the Chicago Sting signed on to play only two games at Washington, both of which were ultimately canceled because of scheduling conflicts with a boat show at the D.C. Armory. In the end, no team played more than nine games in 1978, and only a handful played more than three.

== See also ==
- North American Soccer League
