= 1978 Tampa Bay Rowdies indoor season =

Tampa Bay Rowdies
1978 indoor season
- Owner: (United States) George Strawbridge, Jr.
- General manager: (United States) Chas Serednesky, Jr
- Manager: (England) Gordon Jago
- Stadium: Bayfront Center
- Top goalscorer: League: All: (South Africa) Derek Smethurst (14 goals)
- Highest home attendance: 6,410 (Feb. 3 vs. Diplomats) & (March 10 vs. Kicks)
- Lowest home attendance: 2,600 (May 3 vs. Norwich City)
- Average home league attendance: 5,641
Home colors	Away colors

The 1978 Tampa Bay Rowdies indoor season was the fourth indoor season of the club's existence.

== Overview ==
Though it had appeared, after the success of an international friendly between Tampa Bay and Zenit Leningrad in 1977, that the North American Soccer League was finally poised to sanction a full indoor season for 1978, the owners ultimately pulled the plug on the idea for the second straight year with a majority "no" vote. The NASL however did not restrict teams from scheduling matches on their own.

Tampa Bay scheduled nine indoor games for 1978, eight of which were played. The Rowdies first match on January 28 against the Washington Diplomats also marked Gordon Jago's debut as Rowdies head coach. This was followed by two more matches with Washington. What would have been the fourth match of the season was canceled because the roof of the Hartford Civic Center Coliseum, where the Rowdies were scheduled to take on the Rochester Lancers, collapsed under the weight of a heavy snowfall in the early morning hours of January 18. The next two matches, both against the Tulsa Roughnecks, marked the Roughnecks' first ever match and first ever match in Tulsa, played on February 11 and 14 respectively. This was followed by matches against the Dallas Tornado and Minnesota Kicks. The Rowdies' final match was nearly two months later, an international friendly against Norwich City on May 3. All home games were played at the Bayfront Center in St. Petersburg, Florida.

== Club ==
=== Roster ===
No.	Position	Nation	Player
1	GK	ENG	Paul Hammond
2	DF	ENG	Farrukh Quraishi
4	DF	HAI	Arsène Auguste
5	FW	SCO	David Robb
6	DF	RSA	Mike Connell
7	MF	RSA	Steve Wegerle
8	MF	CAN	Wes McLeod
9	FW	AUS	Adrian Alston
10	FW	ENG	Rodney Marsh (capt.)
11	MF	ENG	Graham Paddon
12	FW	RSA	Derek Smethurst
14	FW	USA	Joey Fink
15	MF	ENG	Mark Lindsay
15	MF	ARG	Luis Papandrea
16	DF	USA	Guy Newman
17	FW	USA	Kevin Eagan
18	GK	USA	Winston DuBose
19	DF	HAI	Frantz St. Lot
20	FW	USA	Boris Bandov
23	DF	USA	Tony Crudo

=== Management and technical staff ===
- (United States) George W. Strawbridge, Jr., owner
- (United States) Chas Serednesky, Jr., general manager
- (England) Gordon Jago, head coach
- (United States) Ken Shields, trainer
- (United States) Alfredo Beronda, equipment manager

== Competitions ==
=== Match reports ===
January 28, 1978 1	Washington Diplomats	7–6 (OT)	Tampa Bay Rowdies	Washington, D.C.
8:00 PM	Welch (0:52); Welch (3:57); Welch (4:16); Garber (20:18); Garber (22:24); Garber; Askew 63:04' (Demkowski)	Report	Smethurst (2:11); Smethurst (20:36); Alston (25:15); Smethurst (28:14); Smethurst (40:19); Fink	Stadium: D.C. Armory; Attendance: 3,662

January 29, 1978 2	Washington Diplomats	3–11	Tampa Bay Rowdies	Washington, D.C.
3:00 PM	Welch (42:52); Garber (55:47); Steele (57:24)	Report	Crudo (10:48); Fink (14:32); Wegerle (20:25); Fink (21:25); Quraishi (30:39); St. Lot (31:26); Quraishi (36:23); Fink (37:57); Quraishi (40:46); Marsh (46:27); Marsh (59:09)	Stadium: D.C. Armory; Attendance: 3,111

February 3, 1978 3	Tampa Bay Rowdies	6–5	Washington Diplomats	St. Petersburg, Florida
8:00 PM	Smethurst (20:08); Lindsay (25:10); Lindsay (28:36); Auguste; Smethurst (54:24); Crudo (57:10)	Report	Welch (3:13); Askew (37:20); Steele (43:00); Darrell (44:13); Welch (48:38)	Stadium: Bayfront Center; Attendance: 6,410; Referee: Fred Usher

February 5, 1978 4	Rochester Lancers	Canceled	Tampa Bay Rowdies	Hartford, Connecticut
Cancelled due to roof collapse		Report		Stadium: Hartford Civic Center Coliseum
Note: Cancelled due to roof collapse.

February 11, 1978 5	Tampa Bay Rowdies	7–3	Tulsa Roughnecks	St. Petersburg, Florida
8:00 PM	Smethurst (4:29); McLeod (13:58); Fink (26:15); Quraishi (29:59); Fink (30:29); Wegerle (41:05); McLeod (49:38)	Report A Report B	Dovedon (7:01); García (8:34); Ferrel (11:26)	Stadium: Bayfront Center; Attendance: 6,384

February 14, 1978 6	Tulsa Roughnecks	6–11	Tampa Bay Rowdies	Tulsa, Oklahoma
8:00 PM (CST)	Stamenkovic (2:27); Molnár (16:25); Ferrel (25:23); Molnár (46:04); McKeown (52:25); Molnár (58:53)	Report	McLeod (7:54); Wegerle (5:17); Smethurst (7:02); Fink (9:05); Lindsay (13:11); Smethurst (33:07); Smethurst (34:22); Smethurst (41:29); St. Lot (53:34); Marsh (54:51); Smethurst (56:37)	Stadium: Tulsa Assembly Center; Attendance: 3,250

February 18, 1978 7	Tampa Bay Rowdies	7–3	Dallas Tornado	St. Petersburg, Florida
8:00 PM	Fink (15:56); Smethurst (29:45); Marsh (42:50); Marsh (43:37); McLeod (45:49); Smethurst (51:49); McLeod (53:14)	Report	Newman (19:37); Newman (23:50); Stahl (41:04)	Stadium: Bayfront Center; Attendance: 6,399

March 10, 1978 8	Tampa Bay Rowdies	11–2	Minnesota Kicks	St. Petersburg, Florida
8:00 PM	McLeod (3:49); Eagan (4:25); Marsh (11:22); Eagan (12:46); Alston (14:18); Alston (20:40); Eagan (45:00); Marsh (52:10); Wegerle (56:39); Wegerle (58:51); Fink (59:57)	Report	Willey (8:10); Vujkovic (23:46)	Stadium: Bayfront Center; Attendance: 6,410

May 3, 1978 9 Int’l friendly	Tampa Bay Rowdies	10–11 (OT)	Norwich City	St. Petersburg, Florida
8:00 PM	Paddon (11:20); Fink (18:56); McLeod (19:23); Wegerle (24:45); Bandov (27:40); McLeod (39:57); Marsh (50:05); Connell (53:48); Marsh (54:07); Robb (59:44)	Report 1 Report 2	Sainty (17:55); Sainty (24:16); Ryan (25:18); Peters (26:21); Peters (30:45); Ryan (33:58); Suggett (34:58); Sainty (41:28); Peters (53:14); Suggett (59:32); Peters 63:43' (Suggett)	Stadium: Bayfront Center; Attendance: 2,384; Referee: Sam Homich

== Statistics ==
=== Scoring ===
GP = Games Played, G = Goals (worth 2 points), A = Assists (worth 1 point), Pts = Points

Player	GP	G	A	Pts
Derek Smethurst	6	14	4	32
Rodney Marsh	8	9	13	31
Joey Fink	8	10	6	26
Wes McLeod	5	8	0	16
Steve Wegerle	7	6	4	16
Kevin Eagan	7	3	7	13
Farrukh Quraishi	7	4	4	12
Adrian Alston	4	3	3	9
Mark Lindsay	7	3	2	8
Boris Bandov	6	1	5	7
Tony Crudo	7	2	2	6
Frantz St. Lot	7	2	1	5
Mike Connell	8	1	2	4
Arsène Auguste	7	1	0	2
David Robb	1	1	0	2
Graham Paddon	1	1	0	2
Luis Papandrea	1	0	1	1
Guy Newman	1	0	0	0

=== Goalkeeping ===
Note: GP = Games played; Min = Minutes; SV = Saves; GA = Goals against; GAA = Goals against average; W = Wins; L = Losses

Player	GP	Min	SV	GA	GAA	W	L
Winston DuBose	7	428	111	35	4.91	5	2
Paul Hammond	1	60	11	5	5.00	1	0

== See also ==
- 1978 team indoor stats
