= Los Angeles Aztecs =

Defunct American soccer club

- Full name: Los Angeles Aztecs
- Founded: December 11, 1973
- Dissolved: December 9, 1981; 44 years ago
- Stadium: East Los Angeles College Stadium (1974); Murdock Stadium (1975–76); LA Memorial Coliseum (1977, 1981); Rose Bowl (1978–80); Indoor: The Forum (1979–80); LA Sports Arena (1980–81)
Home colors	Away colors

The Los Angeles Aztecs were an American professional soccer team based in Los Angeles, California, that existed from 1974 to 1981. The Aztecs competed in the North American Soccer League (NASL) from 1974 to 1981 as well as the 1975 NASL Indoor tournament, the 1979–80 and 1980–81 NASL Indoor seasons, and won the NASL Championship in 1974. During their eight years of existence, the Aztecs played at four different venues and were controlled by four different ownership groups. European soccer legends George Best and Johan Cruyff played for the team, and from 1975 to 1977 English singer Elton John was a part-owner.

== History ==
=== Founding and first season success ===
In January 1974, looking to build off what was considered increasing public interest in professional soccer, the North American Soccer League (NASL) announced Los Angeles as one of six cities awarded an expansion team for the upcoming 1974 season. Jack Gregory, a local doctor and real estate investor, paid the franchise fee and acted as team owner and Alex Perolli was appointed the first head coach. After playing a series of pre-season friendlies against teams from Mexico, the Aztecs opened their first NASL season with a 2–1 win over the Seattle Sounders at the East Los Angeles College Stadium with 4,107 fans in attendance. After three consecutive victories to start the season, Perolli publicly criticized and then fired his starting goal keeper, Trinidad and Tobago international Kelvin Barclay, after he allowed three goals in the second half. The Aztecs finished the season with a record of 11 wins, 2 draws and 7 losses, averaging 5,098 fans per game, and winning first place in the Western Division . Forward Doug McMillan scored eleven goals and was named Rookie of the Year for the 1974 season, an honor he had separately won the previous season with the Cleveland Stars of the American Soccer League. Having earned a first round bye, the Aztecs defeated the Boston Minutemen 2–0 at home in the semi-finals. Having earned the most points during the season, Los Angeles should have hosted the NASL Final 1974; however, due to the CBS televised start time of 3:30 (EDT) and other factors, the game was moved to the Miami Orange Bowl. On August 25, 1974, with 15,507 people in attendance, the Los Angeles Aztecs and the Miami Toros played to a 3–3 draw in regular time, after which Los Angeles won the penalty shoot-out 5–3 to win the 1974 NASL Championship. It was the second year in a row that an expansion franchise and won the championship following the Philadelphia Atoms in 1973.

=== New ownership ===
Following the 1974 season, Alex Perolli left his position as head coach to take up the same job at the expansion San Antonio Thunder and owner Jack Gregory sold his interest in the team to a group headed by John Chaffetz. The new owners hired 25-year-old Terry Fisher, at the time the youngest coach in the NASL, giving him a two-year contract as head coach. That February, the team traded its first and second draft choices to the expansion Chicago Sting and drafted Michael Bain, two-time All-American and captain of the 1974 NCAA Division I Soccer champions Howard Bison. (Note: Michael Bain does not appear on any NASL Official roster) The Aztecs were one of the sixteen NASL teams to participate in the 1975 NASL Indoor tournament. In total, the Aztecs played three indoor matches in 1975, a pre-tournament tune-up match against the San Jose Earthquakes on February 14, and tournament matches against the Vancouver Whitecaps and Seattle Sounders.

The Aztecs opened the 1975 North American Soccer League season with a 2–1 victory on the road against the San Jose Earthquakes. The team's first home sellout occurred on July 3, 1975, in a 5–1 rout of the Pelé led New York Cosmos, Uri Banhoffer scored a hat-trick and was named NASL player of the week for his performance. The team officially protested their 2 August 1975 2–1 overtime loss to Earthquakes stating crowd noise prevented head coach Fisher from communicating with his players between the end of regulation and the beginning of overtime. The team finished the season with a record of twelve wins and ten losses, ending in third place of the Western Division. Making the playoffs as a wild card after Chicago Sting lost their final game of the season to the Washington Diplomats, the Aztecs were defeated by the St. Louis Stars in a quarter-finals match that was decided by a penalty shoot-out.

=== Best years ===
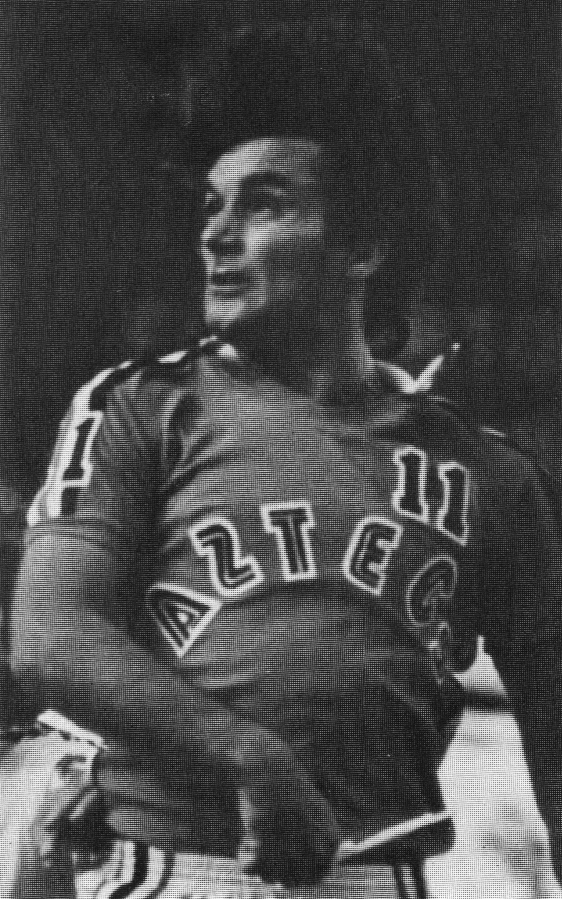
George Best playing for the Aztecs

Following the 1975 season, English singer Elton John, purchased a stake in the team, and was given permission by the league to sit on the bench during games. A few weeks later, Managing General Partner Chaffetz announced the team's intention of signing 1968 Ballon d'Or winner George Best, who had been released by Manchester United. After some confusion in December between the team announcing Best's signing and the player denying he had, George Best arrived in Los Angeles on February 20, 1976. The Aztecs opened the 1976 North American Soccer League season on the road with a 1–2 loss against the San Jose Earthquakes, Best scored his first of fifteen goals for the season on April 25, 1976, in the team's home opener against the Rochester Lancers. Los Angeles finished the season in third place of the Pacific Conference Southern Division with a record of twelve wins and twelve losses. The Aztecs were defeated in the First Round of the playoffs 2–0 by the Dallas Tornado on August 18, 1976.

After playing the previous two seasons at Murdock Stadium on the campus of El Camino College, the team moved to the L.A. Coliseum for the 1977 season. The Aztecs began the 1977 North American Soccer League season on the road against the Earthquakes again, this time beating San Jose 3–0. On July 3, 1977, the largest home crowd of the season, 32,165, attended the game against the Cosmos, for Brazilian superstar Pelé's last competitive appearance in Los Angeles. The Aztec won the game 4–1. The Aztecs finished the season in second place of the Pacific Conference Southern Division with a record of fifteen wins and eleven losses. The Aztecs were defeated by the Seattle Sounders in the Conference Championships after having beaten the Earthquakes in the first round, and Dallas Tornado over two-legs in the Division Championships.

After the season, the team was purchased by a group headed by Alan Rothenberg with former Los Angeles Lakers player Rudy LaRusso named general manager. The Aztecs also signed a lease to play its homes matches at the Rose Bowl for the 1978 North American Soccer League season. In the first game of the season, the Aztecs lost to the Houston Hurricane in a shoot-out after playing to a 2–2 draw. Rumor's of Best's extravagant lifestyle and various personal problems, including alcoholism, began to spread during the previous season. After missing two training sessions and meeting with the team owners to address his concerns with the direction of the club, Best skipped the team's final practice before their May 10, 1978, match against the Oakland Stompers, and the team announced his indefinite suspension. The following month, the team traded Best to the Fort Lauderdale Strikers, with the Aztecs receiving players George Dewsnip, Andy Rowland and the Strikers first 1980 draft choice. On June 6, 1978, and with a record of five wins in thirteen games, the Aztecs fired head coach Terry Fisher and replaced him with Tommy Smith. With only three wins during the next fourteen games, Smith was replaced by team Director of Personnel Peter Short for the final two games of the season. The Aztecs finished the season in last place of the National Conference Western Division, recording nine wins and twenty-one loses. It was the team's worst outdoor season record and the only outdoor season the Aztecs did not qualify for the playoffs. The Aztecs did not participate in the 1978 NASL Skelly Indoor Invitational, but did play a few indoor exhibition games in March 1978.

=== Michels & Cruyff years ===
Head coach Rinus Michels ahead of the 1979 season

On November 14, 1978, team president Larry Friend announced former FC Barcelona, AFC Ajax, and Dutch national team manager Rinus Michels had been hired as head coach. Michels revamped the team's roster with only four players from the Aztecs 1978 team remaining on the roster for the 1979 NASL season. The Aztecs started the season with a record of five wins in seven games when on May 22, 1979, the team announced the signing of three-time Ballon d'Or winner Johan Cruyff on a $1.4 million contract over two years which also included a percentage of gate receipts, making Cruyff the highest paid athlete in Southern California. The Aztecs finished the season in second place of the National Conference Western Division with a record of eighteen wins and twelve losses. Prior to signing Cruyff, the Aztecs averaged 7,500 fans a game, but ended the season with an average attendance of 14,333. The Aztecs defeated the Washington Diplomats two games to none in the first round of the playoffs. The Aztecs won the home leg of the Conference Semifinals against the Vancouver Whitecaps in an overtime shootout, but lost the away leg and the 30 minute mini game. Cruyff was awarded the league MVP and Larry Hulcer was named the Rookie of the Year for the 1979 season.

From September through October 1979, the team embarked on a three-country European tour beginning with a 2–1 victory over Paris Saint-Germain F.C. The team then played six games in the Netherlands winning three, losing two and earning one draw. On the team's final leg through England, the Aztec drew 1–1 against Birmingham City F.C. and lost 2–0 to Chelsea F.C. Mexican media company Televisa purchased the team in early 1980 and sold the team's rights to Johan Cruyff to the Washington Diplomats for $1 million in order to save payroll money; Cruyff alleged the new owners wanted more Mexican players instead of him. The Aztecs participated in the 1979–80 NASL Indoor season earning only two wins in twelve matches. A few weeks prior to the beginning of the 1980 outdoor season, Michels resigned has head coach, but was able to reach an agreement with the new owners and confirmed he would be returning. The Aztecs finished the 1980 season in second place of the National Conference Western Division with a record of twenty wins and twelve losses. Losing the first game of the Conference Quarterfinals at RFK Stadium the Aztecs defeated the Diplomats in the series by winning the home leg in a shootout, and the 30-minute minigame 2–0. The Aztecs advanced to the Conference Championships after defeating the Seattle Sounders in another shootout after each team won their home leg and playing to a 1–1 tie in the minigame. The Aztecs were defeated by the New York Cosmos in both games of the Conference Championships. Less than a month after the team was eliminated from the playoffs, Michels left the team for the position of technical director of FC Köln.

=== Final season ===
The Aztecs achieved their best indoor season record with eleven wins and seven loses and earning first place of the Western Division in the 1980–81 NASL Indoor season but were eliminated in the first round of the playoffs by Edmonton Drillers. On January 9, 1981, the Aztecs announced Cláudio Coutinho had signed a two-year contract to coach the team. The team also moved back to the Los Angeles Memorial Coliseum to play their home games for the 1981 outdoor season. The Aztecs finished the 1981 North American Soccer League season in second place of the Western Division with a record of nineteen wins and thirteen losses and an average attendance of 5,814. The team was knocked out of the first round of the playoffs by the Montreal Manic two games to one, the last game decided on a controversial penalty call in overtime. Following the season on December 9, 1981, Televisa released a statement stating the team would not be operating for the 1982 season and that any remaining player contracts would be sold.

== Year-by-year ==
Year	Division	League	Reg. season	Playoffs	Open Cup	Avg. Attend.
1974	1	NASL	1st, Western	Champions	did not enter	5,098
1975	N/A	NASL Indoor	3rd, Region 4	did not qualify	N/A	N/A
1975	1	NASL	3rd, Western	Quarterfinals	did not enter	8,307
1976	1	NASL	3rd, Pacific Southern	1st Round	did not enter	8,051
1977	1	NASL	3rd, Pacific Southern	Semifinals	did not enter	9,638
1978	N/A	NASL Indoor	4th, Schlitz Tournament	N/A	N/A	N/A
1978	1	NASL	4th, National Western	did not qualify	did not enter	9,301
1979	1	NASL	2nd, National Western	Conference Semifinals	did not enter	14,334
1979–80	N/A	NASL Indoor	5th, Western	did not qualify	N/A	3,152
1980	1	NASL	2nd, National Western	Conference Championships	did not enter	12,057
1980–81	N/A	NASL Indoor	1st, Western	1st Round	N/A	3,439
1981	1	NASL	2nd, Western	1st Round	did not enter	5,814

== Media Coverage ==
Television coverage was present from the start. KMEX-DT, then called KMEX-TV, broadcast a first season match in Spanish, with Hugo Bandi and Luis Bravo commentating. Later KWHY broadcast 8 away matches. Mario Machado, who doubled as public address announcer for a time, provided commentary, with Bandi providing a Spanish translation. (Curiously when KMEX provided coverage in 1981, there would be a similar bilingual format). There would be 8 televised matches in 1977, 7 on KHJ-TV (now KCAL) and the other on KMEX. Radio coverage was happening by now too, with KGIL and KFOX on all but 4 matches, and KWKW doing Spanish coverage on two matches. In 1978, KIIS covered all but 2 matches, and 6 in Spanish on KWKW. 7 matches were on KTTV, with Chick Hearn, who had announced Los Angeles Wolves matches a decade earlier, returning to soccer commentary for two seasons. It was around this time that pay television outlet ON TV broadcast matches as well. KTTV would have 8 (mostly taped) matches in 1979, plus a playoff match, KHJ-TV would televise another playoff match. KIIS would cut back to 10 matches, while KWKW would increase to 14. Both stations would broadcast two home playoff matches. As noted above, KMEX would broadcast 8 matches with bilingual commentary in 1981, Gil Stratton and Jose Losada doing the honors. KWKW would be sole radio broadcaster.

== Notable players ==
- (Mexico) Javier Aguirre
- (United States) Gary Allison
- (England) Lee Atack
- (South Africa) Desmond Backos
- (England) Phil Beal
- (Northern Ireland) George Best
- (Canada) Željko Bilecki
- (Canada) Bob Bolitho
- (England) Colin Boulton
- (England) Colin Clarke
- (United States) Martin Cohen
- (Scotland) Charlie Cooke
- (Uruguay) Julio César Cortés
- (Brazil) Renato Costa
- (England) Peter Coyne
- (Netherlands) Johan Cruyff
- (England) Chris Dangerfield
- (Trinidad and Tobago) Steve David
- (Wales) Ron Davies
- (Mexico) Antonio de la Torre Villalpando
- (United States) Roberto de Oliveira
- (England) George Dewsnip
- (Argentina) Angelo DiBernardo
- (Socialist Federal Republic of Yugoslavia) Vito Dimitrijević
- (Trinidad and Tobago) Tony Douglas
- (England) Gary Etherington
- (United States) Bernie Fagan
- (Scotland) Mike Ferguson
- (United States) Santiago Formoso
- (United States) Randy Garber
- (United States) Poli Garcia
- (United States) Steve Gay
- Uruguay Graffigna
- (United States) Austin Hayes
- (England) Graham Horn
- (United States) Larry Hulcer
- (Wales) Alan Jones
- (England) Garry Jones
- (United States) Jerry Kazarian
- (England) Alan Kelley
- (England) Jimmy Kelly
- (Socialist Federal Republic of Yugoslavia) Mihalj Keri
- (Hungary) György Kottán
- (Canada) Bob Lenarduzzi
- (England) Dave Lennard
- (England) Malcolm Linton
- (Trinidad and Tobago) Sammy Llewellyn
- (Spain) Miguel Lopez
- (Brazil) Luís Fernando Gaúcho
- (United States) Terry Mancini
- (England) Jackie Marsh
- (United States) John Mason
- (England) Bobby McAlinden
- (Scotland) John McGrane
- (Scotland) Mike McLenaghen
- (Scotland) Doug McMillan
- (England) Alan Merrick
- (Peru) Ramón Mifflin
- (United States) Ane Mihailovich
- (United States) Jim Millinder
- (United States) Bill Mishalow
- (Trinidad and Tobago) Ramon Moraldo
- (United States) Dave Morrison
- (Canada) Buzz Parsons
- (United States) Hugo Pérez
- (Mexico) Héctor Pulido
- (United States) Brian Quinn
- (Brazil) Luiz Rangel
- (United States) Tom Reynolds
- (United States) Bob Rigby
- (Scotland) Andy Rolland
- (Argentina) Rubén Omar Romano
- (Netherlands) Thomas Rongen
- (England) Alex Russell
- (Czech Republic) Miro Rys
- (United States) Todd Saldana
- (United States) Bill Sautter
- (United States) Dave Shelton
- (United States) Bobby Sibbald
- (Scotland) Dave Smith
- (England) Tommy Smith
- (Poland) Franciszek Smuda
- (United States) Frantz St. Lot
- (England) Richard A. Deeb
- (Netherlands) Wim Suurbier
- (United States) Chris Turner
- (Hungary) Juli Veee
- (Netherlands) Leo van Veen
- (Mexico) Sergio Velazquez
- (United States) Scott Vorst
- (Germany) Walter Wagner
- (United States) Rudy Ybarra

== Ownership ==
- Dr. Jack Gregory – Founder / co-owner
- Elton John – co-owner (1975–1977)
- Alan Rothenberg – owner (1977–80)
- Televisa – owners (1980–1981)

== Honors ==
NASL championships
- 1974

NASL Regular Season Premierships

- 1974

Division champions

- 1974 Western Division
- 1980–81 Western Division (indoor)

League MVP

- 1979 Johan Cruyff

Rookie of the Year

- 1974 Doug McMillan
- 1979 Larry Hulcer

League scoring champion

- 1977 Steve David (26 goals, 6 assists, 58 points)

League goal scoring champion

- 1977 Steve David (26 goals)

League Assists Leader

- 1974 Doug McMillan (10 assists)
- 1977 George Best (18 assists)

Indoor tournament scoring champion

- 1978 Peter Anderson (6 goals)

Indoor All-Stars

- 1980–81 Mihalj Keri, Chris Dangerfield

All-Star first team selections

- 1976 George Best
- 1977 Steve David, George Best
- 1979 Johan Cruyff

All-Star second team selections

- 1974 Luis Marotte, Doug McMillan
- 1977 Charlie Cooke
- 1979 Mihalj Keri
- 1980 Luis Fernando, Mihalj Keri
- 1981 Mihalj Keri

All-Star honorable mentions

- 1976 Charlie Cooke
- 1979 Wim Suurbier

U.S. Soccer Hall of Fame

- 2003 Bob Lenarduzzi
- 2006 Hugo Pérez

Canadian Soccer Hall of Fame

- 2001 Bob Lenarduzzi
- 2003 Buzz Parsons
- 2004 Bob Bolitho
- 2008 John McGrane

Indoor Soccer Hall of Fame

- 2012 Juli Veee
- 2013 Brian Quinn
