= Dewsnip =

Dewsnip is a surname. Notable people with the surname include:

- George Dewsnip (born 1956), English footballer
- Neil Dewsnip, English football and manager
