= New Jersey Rockets =

The New Jersey Rockets can refer to the following sports teams:

- New Jersey Rockets (ice hockey), an American Tier III ice hockey team competing in the Eastern Hockey League (2013–)
- New Jersey Rockets (MISL), an American defunct professional football (soccer) team
