= Roberto Oliveira =

Roberto Oliveira may refer to:

- Roberto Oliveira (footballer, born 1953), Brazilian football manager and former defender
- Roberto de Oliveira (soccer) (born 1955), American soccer forward
