= Papandrea =

Papandrea is a surname of Greek/Italian origin, present mostly in south Italy and countries with significant Italian settlements such as the United States, Brazil, Australia and Argentina In etymological terms, it is believed to derivate from the vocables “papa” (meaning father/priest) and “Andreas” ( a personal name, equivalent to Andrew in English-speaking countries), thus in a direct translation it would connote something akin to “ Andrew, the father” or “Andrew, the priest”.

Notable people with the surname include:

- Bruna Papandrea (born 1971), Australian film and television producer and the founder of production company Made Up Stories
- Chloe Papandrea (born 1994), Australian singer-songwriter
- James L. Papandrea (born 1963), Australian author, Roman Catholic theologian, historian, speaker, and singer/songwriter
- Luis Papandrea (born 1952), Argentine Argentine retired professional soccer player
- Mary-Rose Papandrea, academic and professor
