= Nicky Megaloudis =

American soccer player-coach

Personal information
- Date of birth: September 24, 1957 (age 69)
- Place of birth: New York, New York, U.S.
- Position: Defender

Youth career
- 1975–1977: Long Island University

Senior career*
Years	Team	Apps	(Gls)
1978–1980	Houston Hurricane	46	(1)
1978–1980	Houston Summit (indoor)	35	(10)
1980–1984	New York Arrows (indoor)	135	(9)
1984–1985	Las Vegas Americans (indoor)	22	(4)
Total		238	(24)

Managerial career
- 1997: Florida Strikers
- 1997–2000: Miami Fusion (assistant)
- * Club domestic league appearances and goals

Nicky Megaloudis (born September 24, 1957) is an American retired soccer defender who played professionally in the North American Soccer League and Major Indoor Soccer League.

== Playing career ==
=== Youth ===
Megaloudis' father, Demosthenes, moved to the United States from Greece in the late 1940s, Megaloudis grew up on Long Island as part of an extensive soccer playing family. In 1975, Megaloudis, uncle of Chris Megaloudis, graduated from Long Island City High School. He then entered Long Island University where he played on the men's soccer team from 1975 to 1977. He was a 1976 and 1977 Honorable Mention (third team) All American.

=== Professional ===
In 1978, Megaloudis turned professional with the Houston Hurricane of the North American Soccer League. That fall, the Houston Summit signed most of the Hurricane roster, including Megaloudis, for the Summit's upcoming Major Indoor Soccer League season. Megaloudis alternated between the two teams until the fall of 1980 when he moved to the New York Arrows. He remained with the Arrows until 1984 when he moved to the Las Vegas Americans for the 1984–1985 season.

== Coaching career ==
In 1997, Megaloudis coached the Florida Strikers of the USISL. In the fall of 1997, he became an assistant coach with the Miami Fusion of Major League Soccer. He held that position until May 2000 when he moved to the Fusion front office.

== Personal life ==
In 2004, Megaloudis' daughter, Nicole Megaloudis, a freshman forward on the Virginia Commonwealth University women's soccer team, died in a single car accident on I-64 West in Goochland County, VA. Megaloudis and his wife, Gail, had divorced and Gail had later married Thomas Rongen. As a result, D.C. United holds an annual Nicole Cup to raise money for college soccer scholarships.
