= Matthew O'Sullivan =

Matthew or Matt O'Sullivan may refer to:

- Matt O'Sullivan (born 1978), Australian senator
- Matt O'Sullivan (soccer), retired American soccer player
- Matthew O'Sullivan (actor) , Australian actor, starring in 2025 film Penny Lane Is Dead

== See also ==
- Matthew Sullivan (disambiguation)
