= Roberto de Oliveira =

American soccer player

Personal information
- Date of birth: September 11, 1955 (age 71)
- Place of birth: New York City, New York, U.S.
- Height: 5 ft 9 in (1.75 m)
- Position: Forward

Senior career*
Years	Team	Apps	(Gls)
1976	Cleveland Cobras	20	(10)
1977	New York Cosmos	1	(0)
1978–1980	Detroit Express	23	(1)
1979–1980	Detroit Express (indoor)	4	(1)
1981	Los Angeles Aztecs	3	(0)
Total		51	(12)
- * Club domestic league appearances and goals

Roberto de Oliveira (born September 11, 1955) is an American former soccer player who played for the Detroit Express in the North American Soccer League.

== Career statistics ==
=== Club ===
Club	Season	League			Cup		Other		Total	
Club	Season	Division	Apps	Goals	Apps	Goals	Apps	Goals	Apps	Goals
Cleveland Cobras	1976	ASL	20	10	0	0	0	0	20	10
New York Cosmos	1977	NASL	1	0	0	0	0	0	1	0
Detroit Express	1978	NASL	3	0	0	0	0	0	3	0
Detroit Express	1979	NASL	13	1	0	0	0	0	13	1
Detroit Express	1980	NASL	7	0	0	0	0	0	7	0
Detroit Express	Total		23	1	0	0	0	0	23	1
Detroit Express	1979–80	NASL (indoor)	4	1	0	0	0	0	4	1
Los Angeles Aztecs	1981	NASL	3	0	0	0	0	0	3	0
Career total			51	12	0	0	0	0	51	12
