= Nino Zec =

Yugoslav footballer

Personal information
- Full name: Ninoslav Zec
- Date of birth: 22 July 1949 (age 77)
- Place of birth: Miloševo, SFR Yugoslavia
- Positions: Midfielder; striker

Senior career*
Years	Team	Apps	(Gls)
1968–1978	OFK Beograd	271	(50)
1978	Tulsa Roughnecks	28	(9)
1979	Atlanta Chiefs	15	(5)
1979–1980	Houston Hurricane	34	(6)
1979–1980	Pittsburgh Spirit (indoor)	6	(0)
1981–1984	Jacksonville Tea Men	45	(6)
1983–1984	Tulsa Roughnecks (indoor)	3	(0)
Total		131	(26)
- * Club domestic league appearances and goals

Ninoslav "Nino" Zec (Serbian Cyrillic: Нинослав Нино Зец, born 7 July 1949) is a Yugoslav retired footballer who played as midfielder or striker.

== Career ==
Born in Miloševo, SR Serbia, Zec began his professional career in 1968 with OFK Beograd. In 1978, Zec moved to the United States to play in the NASL, signing with the Tulsa Roughnecks. He moved to the Atlanta Chiefs in 1979 and was traded to the Houston Hurricane during the season. In 1980, the league terminated the Houston franchise and in December 1980 the Jacksonville Tea Men signed Zec. In 1983, the Tea Men moved to the American Soccer League. Zec spent the 1983 season with the Tea Men in the ASL. When the ASL collapsed at the end of the season, Zec and his teammates moved to the United Soccer League. He also played six games for the Pittsburgh Spirit during the 1979–1980 Major Indoor Soccer League season. He played another three games for the Tulsa Roughnecks during the 1983–1984 NASL indoor season.

He currently lives in Florida where he owns a flooring business. His father in law was one of the most famous Yugoslavian strikers Stjepan Bobek. Zec was the first player ever to receive a yellow card in Yugoslavian football after the booking rule was introduced.
