= Larry Hulcer =

American soccer player and coach

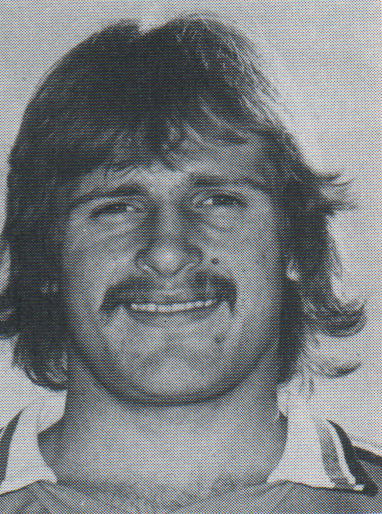
- Hulcer in 1979

Personal information
- Date of birth: April 26, 1957 (age 69)
- Place of birth: St. Louis, Missouri, United States
- Position: Midfielder

College career
Years	Team	Apps	(Gls)
1975–1978	St. Louis Billikens		

Senior career*
Years	Team	Apps	(Gls)
1979	Los Angeles Aztecs	22	(0)
1980–1981	New York Cosmos	16	(0)
1981–1985	St. Louis Steamers (indoor)	93	(15)
1985	Kansas City Comets (indoor)		

International career
1979–1980	United States	8	(1)
- * Club domestic league appearances and goals

Larry Hulcer is a former U.S. soccer forward and midfielder. He spent three seasons in the North American Soccer League and at least three in Major Indoor Soccer League. He also earned eight caps, scoring one goal, with the U.S. national team in 1979 and 1980.

== Player ==
=== College ===
Hulcer attended St. Louis University where he played on the men's soccer team from 1975 to 1978. He was the team's assist leader in 1976 and was a 1978 Honorable Mention (third team) All American. In 1995, St. Louis University inducted Hulcer into its Athletic Hall of Fame.

=== Professional ===
In 1979, the Los Angeles Aztecs drafted Hulcer. That season he earned NASL Rookie of the Year honors. In December 1979, the Aztecs traded Hulcer and Angelo DiBernardo to the New York Cosmos in exchange for Gary Etherington and Santiago Formoso. Hulcer spent the next two seasons with the Cosmos. On December 8, 1981, the St. Louis Steamers of Major Indoor Soccer League purchased Hulcer's contract from the Cosmos. Hulcer then spent the next three indoor seasons with the Steamers, the first year as a forward, the next two as a midfielder. The Steamers unexpectedly released him in February 1985. Hulcer then signed with the Kansas City Comets for the remainder of the season. The Comets released him in October 1985.

=== National team ===
Hulcer began playing with the U.S. B-Team in 1978 as it began preparation for the 1980 Summer Olympics. At the time professionals could not play in the Olympic games and Hulcer signed a professional contract in 1980 which took him off the Olympic squad which qualified for the Olympic games. Unfortunately for the team, the U.S. boycotted the games and the team did not compete. Hulcer earned his first cap with the U.S. national team on February 3, 1979, in a 3–1 loss to the Soviet Union. He then saw time in about half of the U.S. games in 1979. On October 5, 1980, he scored his only goal with the national team in a 2–0 victory over Luxembourg. His last cap came on November 23, 1980, in a loss to Mexico.

== Coach ==
After Hulcer retired from playing professionally, he remained in St. Louis where he joined the coaching ranks and worked for St. Louis Envelope Company. His coaching career included time with the St. Louis Soccer Club and the Busch Soccer Club.
