= Scott Vorst =

American soccer player

Personal information
- Place of birth: St. Louis, Missouri, United States
- Position: Defender

Youth career
- 1977: Saint Louis Billikens

Senior career*
Years	Team	Apps	(Gls)
1978	Los Angeles Aztecs	9	(0)
1978–1979	St. Louis Steamers (indoor)	7	(0)
- * Club domestic league appearances and goals

Scott Vorst is a retired American soccer defender who played professionally in the North American Soccer League and the Major Indoor Soccer League.

In 1977, Vorst played for the Saint Louis Billikens men's soccer. In 1978, he turned professional with the Los Angeles Aztecs of the North American Soccer League. In the fall of 1978, he moved to the St. Louis Steamers of the Major Indoor Soccer League.
