= Luiz Rangel =

Brazilian footballer (born 1956)

Personal information
- Full name: Luiz Ronaldo Nunes Rangel
- Date of birth: August 14, 1956 (age 70)
- Place of birth: Niterói, Brazil
- Height: 5 ft 8 in (1.73 m)
- Position: Midfielder

Youth career
- 1972–1976: Botafogo

Senior career*
Years	Team	Apps	(Gls)
1977–1983	Botafogo		
1980	→ Santa Cruz (loan)		
1981	→ Los Angeles Aztecs (loan)	2	(0)
1982	→ Americano (loan)		
1983	→ Volta Redonda (loan)		
1984	Fortaleza	16	(3)
1987–1988	Vianense	0	(0)
1988–1989	Gouveia	2	(0)
Total		20	(3)

Managerial career
- 2008: Botafogo (interim)
- 2011: Portuguesa (RJ)
- 2011: São Mateus
- 2011: Rio Branco-ES
- * Club domestic league appearances and goals

Luiz Ronaldo Nunes Rangel (born 14 August 1956), commonly known as Luisinho Rangel, Luizinho or Luiz Rangel, is a Brazilian former soccer player who played in the NASL.

== Career statistics ==
Club	Season	League			Cup		Other		Total	
Club	Season	Division	Apps	Goals	Apps	Goals	Apps	Goals	Apps	Goals
Los Angeles Aztecs (loan)	1981	NASL	2	0	0	0	0	0	2	0
Fortaleza	1984	Série A	16	3	0	0	0	0	16	3
Vianense	1987–88	Segunda Divisão	0	0	0	0	0	0	0	0
Gouveia	1988–89	Terceira Divisão	2	0	0	0	0	0	2	0
Career total			20	3	0	0	0	0	20	3
