= Angelo DiBernardo =

Argentine-American soccer player and coach

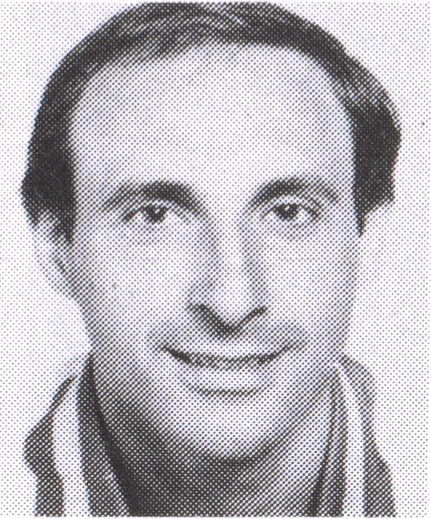
- DiBernardo circa 1984

Personal information
- Date of birth: May 16, 1956 (age 70)
- Place of birth: Buenos Aires, Argentina
- Positions: Midfielder; forward

College career
Years	Team	Apps	(Gls)
1976–1978	Indiana University		

Senior career*
Years	Team	Apps	(Gls)
1979	Los Angeles Aztecs	15	(1)
1980–1984	New York Cosmos	80	(11)
1984–1985	New York Cosmos (indoor)	30	(13)
1985–1986	Kansas City Comets (indoor)	48	(11)
1987–1988	St. Louis Steamers (indoor)	6	(0)

International career
1979–1985	United States	20	(3)

Managerial career
- 1991–2013: Waubonsie Valley High School
- * Club domestic league appearances and goals

Angelo DiBernardo (born May 16, 1956) is a former soccer player who played professionally in the North American Soccer League and Major Indoor Soccer League. Born in Argentina, he played for the United States national team and also represented them at the 1984 Summer Olympics. After retiring from playing professionally, he taught Spanish and coached boys and girls high school soccer.

== Youth and college ==
DiBernardo, a native of Argentina, moved to the United States with his family when he was sixteen. His family settled in the Chicago area where DiBernardo attended J. Sterling Morton High School West in Berwyn, Illinois. He played soccer both for the school's soccer team and for Sparta, a local Chicago club. DiBernardo attended Indiana University where he played on the school's men's soccer team for three seasons from 1976 to 1978. He had an immediate impact on the team, helping it to the 1976 NCAA Men's Soccer Championship which Indiana lost to San Francisco. In 1977, Indiana failed to make the NCAA post-season, but DiBernardo was selected as a first team All American. In 1978, Indiana reprised the 1976 season, making it to the championship game, but losing to San Francisco yet again. This year DiBernardo won the Hermann Trophy as the top collegiate soccer player in the country. At the end of the season, DiBernardo left Indiana and turned pro. He finished his collegiate career with 54 goals and 17 assists for 125 points. In 1991, Indiana University inducted DiBernardo into its Athletic Hall of Fame. He was also selected to the Soccer America College Team of the Century.

== National team ==
In February 1979, DiBernardo earned his first cap for the national team, coming on as a substitute for Ty Keough in a loss to the Soviet Union. DiBernardo played every national team game in 1979 and was selected to play at the 1980 Summer Olympics in Moscow, but the U.S. boycotted the games. DiBernardo became an integral part of the U.S. efforts to qualify for the 1982 World Cup and played in the four qualification games in 1980, but the U.S. failed to reach the finals.

== NASL ==
By this time DiBernardo had already played a season with the Los Angeles Aztecs, who drafted DiBernardo, of the North American Soccer League. He played the 1979 season with the Aztecs before they traded him and Larry Hulcer to the New York Cosmos. He would remain with the Cosmos from 1980 until 1984 when the NASL collapsed. He had played for the Cosmos as an amateur in the late 1970s. In 1980, he played 29 games and scored 7 goals, adding 13 assists. The 1981 season began well for DiBernardo. He played defense, midfield and forward with the top NASL team until he pulled a hamstring. The injury healed slowly and limited him to only 17 games with the team. In 1982, DiBernardo played only one game before being badly injured in a hard tackle. Although he recovered from the injury, he never regained his pre-injury quickness or agility. In addition to playing outdoors with the Cosmos, DiBernardo played the 1983–1984 NASL indoor season. In May 1984, the Cosmos asked DiBernardo to take a 20% pay cut. He refused and the team placed him on waivers seven games into the season.

== 1984 Olympics ==
After being cut by the Cosmos, DiBernardo spent the rest of the spring and summer playing with the national team as it prepared for the 1984 Summer Olympics and began the qualification for the 1986 FIFA World Cup. He played two of the U.S. team's games in the Olympics. His last game with the national team came as a substitute in the 1985 World Cup qualification loss to Costa Rica in Torrance which led to the failure of the team to make the finals.

== MISL ==
He played the 1985–1986 Major Indoor Soccer League season with the Kansas City Comets. In 1987–1988, he played six games with the St. Louis Steamers before suffering a back injury which finished his playing career.

== High school coaching ==
Since retiring from playing, DiBernardo became a Spanish teacher and soccer coach at Waubonsie Valley High School in Aurora, Illinois beginning in 1991. The team's highest finish came in 2001 when it took third in the state. DiBernardo also coached the school's girls team for a single season, 1991–1992. That team went 19–2–3. DiBernardo's Argentinian heritage has aided him with teaching the Spanish language and South American culture. DiBernardo was let go from Waubonsie Valley in December 2013, after coaching for 23 seasons with a 335–147–55 record.

He also founded the Americas Soccer Club with Rudy Keller, who had played with DiBernardo in their youth club days.

== Family ==
DiBernardo's daughter Vanessa was a member of the U.S. Women's Under-20 National Team that won the Under-20 Women's World Cup in Japan in 2012. Vanessa played for the University of Illinois women's soccer team and currently plays for the Kansas City Current.
