= Matthew Sullivan (disambiguation) =

Matthew Sullivan was an architect.

Matthew or Matt Sullivan may also refer to:

- Matt Sullivan (1857–1937), Chief Justice of California
- Matt Sullivan character in Blackwoods
- Matt Sullivan, character in 40 Days and 40 Nights

== See also ==
- Matthew O'Sullivan (disambiguation)
