= George Dewsnip =

English footballer

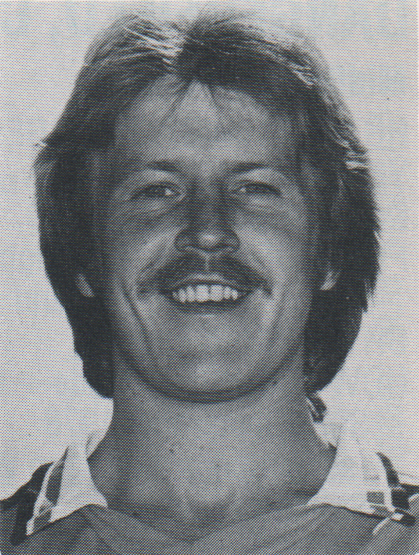
- Dewsnip in 1979

Personal information
- Date of birth: 6 May 1956 (age 70)
- Place of birth: Little HultonSalford, England
- Position: Left winger

Youth career
- Thurrock
- Gidea Park Rangers

Senior career*
Years	Team	Apps	(Gls)
1972–1974	Preston North End	0	(0)
1974–1977	Southport	87	(11)
1977–1978	Fort Lauderdale Strikers	28	(3)
1978–1979	Los Angeles Aztecs	13	(3)
1979	Atlanta Chiefs	17	(0)
1980	Columbus Magic		
1980–1982	Cleveland Force (indoor)	54	(18)
1982	New Jersey Rockets (indoor)	12	(1)
- * Club domestic league appearances and goals

George Dewsnip is an English retired professional footballer who played in the Football League, North American Soccer League, American Soccer League and Major Indoor Soccer League.

He became an apprentice in 1972 and later signed professional terms with Preston North End but was released in 1974 without making a first team appearance. He then joined nearby Southport.

In June 1977, Southport sold Dewsnip's contract to the Fort Lauderdale Strikers of the North American Soccer League for £11,000. In June 1978, the Strikers sent Dewsnip, Andy Rolland and the number one selection in the 1980 NASL Draft to the Los Angeles Aztecs in exchange for George Best. He spent a season and a half in Los Angeles before being sent to the Atlanta Chiefs. He finished the 1979 season in Atlanta, then played for the Columbus Magic of the American Soccer League in 1980. That fall, he signed with the Cleveland Force of the Major Indoor Soccer League.
