= Tibor Molnar (footballer, born 1952) =

Hungarian footballer

Tibor Molnár
Personal information
- Date of birth: 6 June 1952 (age 74)
- Place of birth: Budapest, Hungary
- Position: Midfielder

Youth career
- 1967–1969: Vasas SC

Senior career*
Years	Team	Apps	(Gls)
1971	Dallas Tornado (indoor)	2	(0)
1971	Dallas Tornado	2	(0)
1973–1974	Toronto Hungaria		
1974–1975	Toronto Italia		(17)
1976	Rochester Lancers (indoor)	4	(3)
1976	Rochester Lancers	4	(0)
1976–1977	San Jose Earthquakes	32	(0)
1978	Tulsa Roughnecks (indoor)	4	(4)
1978	Montreal Castors		
1978–1981	New York Arrows (indoor)	74	(33)
1980–1981	Hartford Hellions (indoor)	21	(5)
1981	Baltimore Blast (indoor)	3	(0)
1982–1983	Pittsburgh Spirit (indoor)	27	(6)
- * Club domestic league appearances and goals

Tibor Molnar (born June 6, 1952) is a Hungarian former footballer who played as a midfielder in the North American Soccer League, the Canadian National Soccer League, and the Major Indoor Soccer League in the 1970s and early 1980s.

== Early life ==
Born in Budapest, he grew up in the same neighborhood as indoor soccer hall-of-famer, Juli Veee. Like many, he disliked how the totalitarian, communist government controlled nearly every aspect of a Hungarian's life, and dreamed of life in a free society like the U.S. By his own accounts, he and a friend were always trying to sneak away to the west, posing as tourists, but were regularly stopped at the border. Rather than place him in jail and put him on trial, as would likely happen to adults at that time, the border guards would merely put him and his friend on a bus back home.

== Career ==
He played for second division side Vasas SC at age 15 and quit school because of soccer. Two years later in 1970 he sneaked out of the country, presumably as a tourist visiting Vienna on his 18th birthday. He trained with FK Austria Wien, and friends arranged for him to travel to the U.S. In 1971 Molnar joined the Dallas Tornado of NASL and scored his only NASL goal in Game 1 of the NASL Championship Final. After the 1971 season Molnar returned first to Austria, and then attempted to play for Beerschot A.C., a Belgian side from Antwerp, but instead was forced to serve a two-year European suspension for playing outside Hungary without permission. In 1973 and 1974 he played in the National Soccer League to play with Toronto Hungaria. The second portion of the 1974 NSL season he played with Toronto Italia.

In 1976, he returned to the NASL to play with the Rochester Lancers. Primarily a playmaker, he became unhappy with the defense-first role that Lancers coach Don Popovic wanted him to play. After playing in only four of the first seven matches of the season, he requested a trade. The team obliged, and on June 8, 1976, he was transferred for cash to the San Jose Earthquakes, where he played two seasons before being dealt to the Tulsa Roughnecks in exchange for Victor Kodelja. Later in 1978 he returned to the National Soccer League to play with Montreal Castors.

== Indoor career ==
Molnar played indoor soccer in both the NASL and MISL. He was a member of the 1971 indoor tournament champion Dallas Tornado, recording one assist in 2 games. In the 1976 tournament he was a runner-up with Rochester scoring three goals in four games. In the winter of 1978, Molnar returned to the indoor scene to play with Tulsa Roughnecks. He was named co-MVP of the Skelly Invitational, won by Tulsa.

When the MISL began play in 1978 he joined Coach Popovic's New York Arrows, winning titles in 1978–79 and 1979–80. From there he had injury-plagued stops with the Hartford Hellions, Baltimore Blast and Pittsburgh Spirit before retiring.

== Honors ==
- Dallas Tornado
  - NASL: 1971
  - NASL indoor: 1971
- Toronto Italia
  - CNSL: 1975
- Rochester Lancers
  - NASL indoor: Runner up 1976
- Tulsa Roughnecks
  - NASL indoor: 1978
- New York Arrows
  - MISL: 1978–79
  - MISL: 1979–80

Individual honors

- Tournament MVP
  - NASL indoor: 1978
