= Dave Shelton =

American soccer player

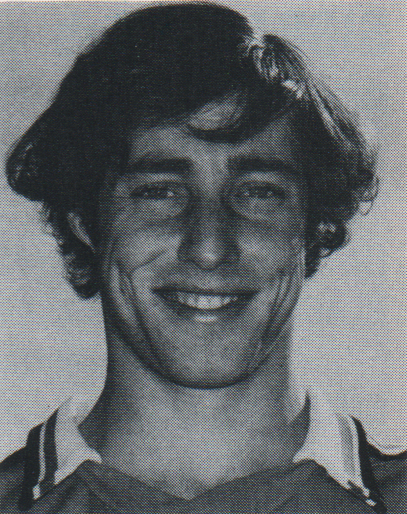
- Shelton in 1979

Personal information
- Full name: David Shelton
- Date of birth: February 27, 1956 (age 70)
- Place of birth: Chicago, Illinois, United States
- Positions: Midfielder; defender

Youth career
- 1975–1977: Indiana Hoosiers

Senior career*
Years	Team	Apps	(Gls)
1978	Detroit Express	5	(0)
1979–1981	Los Angeles Aztecs	27	(0)
1979–1981	Los Angeles Aztecs (indoor)	28	(12)
- * Club domestic league appearances and goals

Dave Shelton is a retired American soccer player who played four seasons in the North American Soccer League.

Shelton attended the Indiana University where he played on the men's soccer team from 1975 to 1977. He was the 1976 NCAA Most Outstanding Defensive Player as the Hoosiers finished runner-up in the NCAA Men's Division I Soccer Championship. In 1977, he was selected as an Honorable Mention All American.

In 1978, Shelton turned professional when the Detroit Express of the North American Soccer League picked him second overall in the draft. In 1979, he moved to the Los Angeles Aztecs where he played three outdoor and two indoor seasons.
