= 1979 North American Soccer League season =

Soccer league season

North American Soccer League
- Season: 1979
- Country: United States; Canada
- Teams: 24
- Champions: Vancouver Whitecaps (1st title)
- Premiers: New York Cosmos (3rd title)
- Matches: 360
- Goals: 1,374 (3.82 per match)
- Top goalscorer: (Italy) Giorgio Chinaglia (26 goals)
- Biggest home win: SEA 9–0 EDM (August 1)
- Biggest away win: MEM 0–6 ATL (July 21); SJ 0–6 SD (August 11)
- Highest scoring: DET 6–5 (SO) CHI (July 7); DET 8–2 FTL (June 27)
- Longest winning run: 8, New York (July 8 – August 12)
- Longest losing run: 14, Edmonton (May 26 – July 18)
- Highest attendance: 76,031 (Tulsa at New York) (August 26)
- Lowest attendance: 653 (N.E. at Houston) (April 19)
- Average attendance: 14,201

The 1979 North American Soccer League season was the 67th season of FIFA-sanctioned soccer and the 12th with a national first-division league in the United States and Canada.

== Changes from the previous season ==
=== Rules changes ===
A rule modification required that each squad play two U.S. or Canadian players and that each 17-man roster carry six such players.

=== New teams ===
- None

=== Teams folding ===
- None

=== Teams moving ===
- Colorado Caribous to Atlanta Chiefs
- Oakland Stompers to Edmonton Drillers

=== Name changes ===
- Cosmos to New York Cosmos
- Toronto Metros-Croatia to Toronto Blizzard

== Map of clubs ==
American East Division American Central Division American West Division
National East Division National Central Division National West Division

== Season recap ==
Compared to the previous season's upheaval, 1979 was a relatively tranquil year. The league format remained unchanged with 24 teams divided into six divisions within two conferences, and a 16-team playoff. A slight modification to the first round of the playoffs, from a single game to the two-game format used in later rounds, was made. Also the minigame, used to decide tied playoff series, no longer ended on a golden goal (sudden death). Instead, the entire 30 minutes was played.

Still, there were issues to be sorted out. There was a brief players' strike on April 14, as the league refused to recognize the newly formed Players Association. However, since the majority of NASL players were foreign and unsure of American and Canadian labor laws, support was minimal. An estimated three quarters of NASL players crossed the picket line once the Justice Department implied that foreign players would be subject to deportation.

The Cosmos decided to put "New York" back into their name after a two-year absence. With a change in ownership, the Toronto franchise was now called the Toronto Blizzard, while Toronto Croatia (who had merged with the Metros back in 1975) returned to their old league, the National Soccer League. The Colorado Caribous moved to Atlanta to become the reborn Atlanta Chiefs in October 1978, while the Oakland Stompers would move to Edmonton just a month before the start of the season. Both teams struggled, finishing last in their respective divisions. The new Edmonton Drillers were particularly bad, setting a record for most consecutive losses in league history with 14.

At the other end of the table, the Houston Hurricane went from worst to first in the American Conference, going undefeated in their 15 home matches at the Astrodome and earning Timo Liekoski Coach of the Year honors. However, the Hurricane were upset in the first round of the ASC playoffs, as the Philadelphia Fury, who were winless on the road during the regular season, won the deciding game in Houston.

That meant the door was opened for the Tampa Bay Rowdies to win their second straight ASC title, sweeping the Fury and outlasting the San Diego Sockers in a minigame at Tampa Stadium. The Rowdies were led by Oscar Fabbiani's 25 goals and a defense that gave up 46 goals, the second-fewest in the league.

The two-time defending champion Cosmos kept rolling, posting another 24–6 record and surpassing their league record for points with 216. Johan Cruyff joined the team in the fall of 1978 for a few exhibitions, but the Los Angeles Aztecs bought out his NASL option for $600,000 to take him to the West Coast. Cruyff scored two goals against the Rochester Lancers on his debut, while leading the Aztecs to a nine-win turnaround. Despite their second-round playoff loss to the Vancouver Whitecaps, he earned league MVP honors for his efforts.

New York proved that they did not need him to score goals, as Giorgio Chinaglia led the league for the third straight year. However, he lost out on the scoring title by a point to Fabbiani. As befitting their status within the league, the Cosmos had the honor of playing in the first game of ABC Sports' three-year TV contract with the league in May; a Soccer Bowl '78 rematch in which they lost 3–2 at Tampa Bay. The network would cover nine regular-season and playoff games per year. This included coverage of the next three Soccer Bowls.

However, the league's dream of the Cosmos hosting another Soccer Bowl in front of a national TV audience went up in smoke when New York lost to Vancouver in a memorable playoff matchup. After the Whitecaps won the first game of the National Conference final in Vancouver, the teams played for three and a half hours at Giants Stadium three days later on ABC. The Cosmos won the regular game in a shootout, tying the series at one. The deciding minigame would also go to a shootout, where Derek Possee gave Vancouver the lead. After the Cosmos' Ricky Davis and the Whitecaps' Alan Ball missed on their chances, New York's Nelsi Morais was unable to beat the five-second clock and his goal was waved off, giving Vancouver the win.

Vancouver went on to beat the Rowdies a week later in the Soccer Bowl. Trevor Whymark scored both Vancouver goals and earned game MVP honors, while Tampa Bay suffered their second straight loss in the championship game. Attendance at Giants Stadium was well below projections, as 50,699 showed up despite 66,843 tickets having been sold. The Whitecaps' Alan Ball was named playoff MVP for his seven-assist effort in Vancouver's championship run. Attendance estimates vary (they range from 60,000 to 150,000 people), but the resulting championship parade is still considered the largest public demonstration in Vancouver civic history.

Another positive sign for the league was that this would be the first offseason in NASL history where no franchises folded or moved.

== Regular season ==
6 points for a win, 0 points for a loss, 1 point for each regulation goal scored up to three per game.

=== Division standings ===
-Playoffs via division standings. -Playoffs via wildcard.

American Conference

East Division
Pos	Team	Pld	W	L	GF	GA	GD	BP	Pts
1	Tampa Bay Rowdies	30	19	11	67	46	+21	55	169
2	Fort Lauderdale Strikers	30	17	13	75	64	+11	63	165
3	Philadelphia Fury	30	10	20	55	60	−5	51	111
4	New England Tea Men	30	12	18	41	56	−15	38	110

Updated to match(es) played on September 2, 1979. Source: Overall standings

Central Division
Pos	Team	Pld	W	L	GF	GA	GD	BP	Pts
1	Houston Hurricane	30	22	8	61	46	+15	55	187
2	Chicago Sting	30	16	14	70	61	+9	63	159
3	Detroit Express	30	14	16	60	56	+4	48	132
4	Memphis Rogues	30	6	24	38	74	−36	37	73

Updated to match(es) played on September 2, 1979. Source: Overall standings

West Division
Pos	Team	Pld	W	L	GF	GA	GD	BP	Pts
1	San Diego Sockers	30	15	15	59	55	+4	50	140 (Note: San Diego and California finished the season with identical records and point totals. San Diego was awarded the division title due to a better goal differential.)
2	California Surf	30	15	15	53	56	−3	50	140
3	Edmonton Drillers	30	8	22	43	78	−35	40	88
4	San Jose Earthquakes	30	8	22	41	74	−33	38	86

Updated to match(es) played on September 2, 1979. Source: Overall standings
Notes:

National Conference

East Division
Pos	Team	Pld	W	L	GF	GA	GD	BP	Pts
1	New York Cosmos	30	24	6	84	52	+32	72	216
2	Washington Diplomats	30	19	11	68	50	+18	58	172
3	Toronto Blizzard	30	14	16	52	65	−13	49	133
4	Rochester Lancers	30	15	15	43	57	−14	42	132

Updated to match(es) played on September 2, 1979. Source: Overall standings

Central Division
Pos	Team	Pld	W	L	GF	GA	GD	BP	Pts
1	Minnesota Kicks	30	21	9	67	48	+19	58	184
2	Dallas Tornado	30	17	13	53	51	+2	50	152
3	Tulsa Roughnecks	30	14	16	61	56	+5	55	139
4	Atlanta Chiefs	30	12	18	59	61	−2	49	121

Updated to match(es) played on September 2, 1979. Source: Overall standings

West Division
Pos	Team	Pld	W	L	GF	GA	GD	BP	Pts
1	Vancouver Whitecaps	30	20	10	54	34	+20	52	172
2	Los Angeles Aztecs	30	18	12	62	47	+15	54	162
3	Seattle Sounders	30	13	17	58	52	+6	47	125
4	Portland Timbers	30	11	19	50	75	−25	56	122

Updated to match(es) played on September 2, 1979. Source: Overall standings

=== Conference standings ===
==== American Conference ====
American Conference standings
Pos	Div	Team	Pld	W	L	GF	GA	GD	BP	Pts	Playoff qualification
1	C	Houston Hurricane	30	22	8	61	46	+15	55	187	Division winners
2	E	Tampa Bay Rowdies (A)	30	19	11	67	46	+21	55	169	Division winners
3	W	San Diego Sockers	30	15	15	59	55	+4	50	140	Division winners
4	E	Fort Lauderdale Strikers	30	17	13	75	64	+11	63	165	Division runners-up
5	C	Chicago Sting	30	16	14	70	61	+9	63	159	Division runners-up
6	W	California Surf	30	15	15	53	56	−3	50	140	Division runners-up
7	C	Detroit Express	30	14	16	60	56	+4	48	132	Wildcards
8	E	Philadelphia Fury	30	10	20	55	60	−5	51	111	Wildcards
9	E	New England Tea Men	30	12	18	41	56	−15	38	110	
10	W	Edmonton Drillers	30	8	22	43	78	−35	40	88	
11	W	San Jose Earthquakes	30	8	22	41	74	−33	38	86	
12	C	Memphis Rogues	30	6	24	38	74	−36	37	73	

Updated to match(es) played on September 2, 1979. Source: Overall standings
Rules for classification: 1) Division position; 2) Points; 3) Wins; 4) Goal differential
(A) Conference champion

==== National Conference ====
National Conference standings
Pos	Div	Team	Pld	W	L	GF	GA	GD	BP	Pts	Playoff qualification
1	E	New York Cosmos	30	24	6	84	52	+32	72	216	Division winners
2	C	Minnesota Kicks	30	21	9	67	48	+19	58	184	Division winners
3	W	Vancouver Whitecaps (N)	30	20	10	54	34	+20	52	172	Division winners
4	E	Washington Diplomats	30	19	11	68	50	+18	58	172	Division runners-up
5	W	Los Angeles Aztecs	30	18	12	62	47	+15	54	162	Division runners-up
6	C	Dallas Tornado	30	17	13	53	51	+2	50	152	Division runners-up
7	C	Tulsa Roughnecks	30	14	16	61	56	+5	55	139	Wildcards
8	E	Toronto Blizzard	30	14	16	52	65	−13	49	133	Wildcards
9	E	Rochester Lancers	30	15	15	43	57	−14	42	132	
10	W	Seattle Sounders	30	13	17	58	52	+6	47	125	
11	W	Portland Timbers	30	11	19	50	75	−25	56	122	
12	C	Atlanta Chiefs	30	12	18	59	61	−2	49	121	

Updated to match(es) played on September 2, 1979. Source: Overall standings
Rules for classification: 1) Division position; 2) Points; 3) Wins; 4) Goal differential
(N) Conference champion

=== Overall standings ===
Overall standings
Pos	Div	Team	Pld	W	L	GF	GA	GD	BP	Pts
1	NE	New York Cosmos	30	24	6	84	52	+32	72	216
2	AC	Houston Hurricane	30	22	8	61	46	+15	55	187
3	NC	Minnesota Kicks	30	21	9	67	48	+19	58	184
4	NW	Vancouver Whitecaps (C)	30	20	10	54	34	+20	52	172
5	NE	Washington Diplomats	30	19	11	68	50	+18	58	172
6	AE	Tampa Bay Rowdies	30	19	11	67	46	+21	55	169
7	AE	Fort Lauderdale Strikers	30	17	13	75	64	+11	63	165
8	NW	Los Angeles Aztecs	30	18	12	62	47	+15	54	162
9	AC	Chicago Sting	30	16	14	70	61	+9	63	159
10	NC	Dallas Tornado	30	17	13	53	51	+2	50	152
11	AW	San Diego Sockers	30	15	15	59	55	+4	50	140
12	AW	California Surf	30	15	15	53	56	−3	50	140
13	NC	Tulsa Roughnecks	30	14	16	61	56	+5	55	139
14	NE	Toronto Blizzard	30	14	16	52	65	−13	49	133
15	NE	Rochester Lancers	30	15	15	43	57	−14	42	132
16	AC	Detroit Express	30	14	16	60	56	+4	48	132
17	NW	Seattle Sounders	30	13	17	58	52	+6	47	125
18	NW	Portland Timbers	30	11	19	50	75	−25	56	122
19	NC	Atlanta Chiefs	30	12	18	59	61	−2	49	121
20	AE	Philadelphia Fury	30	10	20	55	60	−5	51	111
21	AE	New England Tea Men	30	12	18	41	56	−15	38	110
22	AW	Edmonton Drillers	30	8	22	43	78	−35	40	88
23	AW	San Jose Earthquakes	30	8	22	41	74	−33	38	86
24	AC	Memphis Rogues	30	6	24	38	74	−36	37	73

Updated to match(es) played on September 2, 1979. Source: soccerstats.us
Rules for classification: 1) Points; 2) Wins; 3) Goal differential
(C) NASL Champions

== NASL League Leaders ==
=== Scoring ===
GP = Games Played, G = Goals (worth 2 points), A = Assists (worth 1 point), Pts = Points

Player	Team	GP	G	A	Pts
(Chile) Oscar Fabbiani	Tampa Bay Rowdies	26	25	8	58
(Italy) Giorgio Chinaglia	New York Cosmos	27	26	5	57
(Germany) Gerd Müller	Fort Lauderdale Strikers	25	19	17	55
(Scotland) David Robb	Philadelphia Fury	30	16	20	52
(England) Jeff Bourne	Atlanta Chiefs	29	18	15	51
(Germany) Karl-Heinz Granitza	Chicago Sting	30	20	10	50
(Peru) Teófilo Cubillas	Fort Lauderdale Strikers	30	16	18	50
(England) Alan Willey	Minnesota Kicks	29	21	7	49
(England) Dennis Tueart	New York Cosmos	27	16	16	48
(England) Laurie Abrahams	California/Tulsa	25	18	9	45
(Netherlands) Johan Cruyff	Los Angeles Aztecs	23	13	16	42

=== Goalkeeping ===
Note: GP = Games played; Min - Minutes played; GA = Goals against; GAA = Goals against average; W = Wins; L = Losses; SO = Shutouts

Player	Team	GP	Min	SV	GA	GAA	W	L	SO
(England) Phil Parkes	Vancouver Whitecaps	29	2704	100	29	0.96	20	9	7
(United States) Victor Nogueira	Atlanta Chiefs	17	1432	79	20	1.26	8	8	5
(Canada) Željko Bilecki	Tampa Bay Rowdies	17	1549	93	22	1.28	12	5	5
(United States) Mike Ivanow	Seattle Sounders	28	2517	149	39	1.39	13	15	2
(Northern Ireland) Bill Irwin	Washington Diplomats	28	2603	134	42	1.45	17	11	4
(England) Paul Hammond	Houston Hurricane	29	2705	215	44	1.46	21	8	6
(Germany) Volkmar Gross	San Diego/Minnesota	24	2132	137	38	1.604	17	7	6
(England) Kevin Keelan	New England Tea Men	25	2242	133	40	1.605	12	13	2
(England) Colin Boulton	Los Angeles/Tulsa	30	2746	109	49	1.606	16	14	7
(Canada) Tino Lettieri	Minnesota Kicks	16	1368	95	25	1.63	10	5	2

== NASL All-Stars ==
First Team	Position	Second Team	Honorable Mention
(England) Phil Parkes, Vancouver	G	(England) Paul Hammond, Houston	(United States) Alan Mayer, San Diego
(Brazil) Carlos Alberto, New York	D	(Brazil) Marinho, New York	(England) Steve Litt, Minnesota
(Canada) Bruce Wilson, Chicago	D	(Scotland) John Gorman, Tampa Bay	(United States) Bob Smith, San Diego
(Netherlands) Wim Rijsbergen, New York	D	(Socialist Federal Republic of Yugoslavia) Mihalj Keri, Los Angeles	(Netherlands) Wim Suurbier, Los Angeles
(South Africa) Mike Connell, Tampa Bay	D	(Canada) Bob Lenarduzzi, Vancouver	(Portugal) Artur Correia, New England
(Germany) Franz Beckenbauer, New York	M	(Peru) Teófilo Cubillas, Fort Lauderdale	(England) Rodney Marsh, Tampa Bay
(Netherlands) Johan Neeskens, New York	M	(Socialist Federal Republic of Yugoslavia) Vladislav Bogićević, New York	(England) Alan Hudson, Seattle
(South Africa) Ace Ntsoelengoe, Minnesota	M	(England) Alan Ball, Vancouver	(Republic of Ireland) Gerry Daly, New England
(Netherlands) Johan Cruyff, Los Angeles	F	(Chile) Óscar Fabbiani, Tampa Bay	(Denmark) Jørgen Kristensen, Chicago
(England) Trevor Francis, Detroit	F	(Germany) Karl-Heinz Granitza, Chicago	(South Africa) Steve Wegerle, Tampa Bay
(Italy) Giorgio Chinaglia, New York	F	(Germany) Gerd Müller, Fort Lauderdale	(England) Dennis Tueart, New York

== Playoff ==
The top two teams from each division qualified for the playoffs automatically. The two teams with the highest point totals remaining in each conference filled out the field as wild cards and were given the lowest first round seeds. Playoff match-ups and home/away status were reset after each round, based on regular season point totals.

In 1979 and 1980, if a playoff series was tied at one victory each, a full 30 minute mini-game was played. If neither team held an advantage after the 30 minutes, the teams would then move on to an NASL shoot-out to determine a series winner.

=== Bracket ===
Conference Quarterfinals
A1	Houston Hurricane	1	1	–
A8	Philadelphia Fury	2	2	–
A2	Tampa Bay Rowdies	3	3	–
A7	Detroit Express	0	1	–
American Conference
A3	San Diego Sockers	4	7	–
A6	California Surf	2	2	–
A4	Fort Lauderdale Strikers	0	0	–
A5	Chicago Sting	2	1	–
N1	New York Cosmos	3	2	–
N8	Toronto Blizzard	1	0	–
N2	Minnesota Kicks	1	1	–
N7	Tulsa Roughnecks	2	2	–
National Conference
N3	Vancouver Whitecaps	3	2	–
N6	Dallas Tornado	2	1	–
N4	Washington Diplomats	1	3	–
N5	Los Angeles Aztecs	3	4	–

Conference Semifinals
A2	Tampa Bay Rowdies	3(2)	1	–
A8	Philadelphia Fury	2(0)	0	–
A5	Chicago Sting	0	0	–
A3	San Diego Sockers	2	1	–
N1	New York Cosmos	0	3	3
N7	Tulsa Roughnecks	3	0	1
N3	Vancouver Whitecaps	2(1)	1	1
N5	Los Angeles Aztecs	3(2)	0	0

Conference Championships
A2	Tampa Bay Rowdies	1	3(3)	1
A3	San Diego Sockers	2	2(0)	0
N1	New York Cosmos	0	3(3)	0(2)
N3	Vancouver Whitecaps	2	2(1)	1(3)

Soccer Bowl '79
A2	Tampa Bay Rowdies	1
N3	Vancouver Whitecaps	2

=== First round ===
Lower seed		Higher seed	Game 1	Game 2	Mini-game	(lower seed hosts Game 1)
Philadelphia Fury	-	Houston Hurricane	2–1	2–1	x	August 14 • Veterans Stadium • 3,337; August 20 • Houston Astrodome • 7,530
Detroit Express	-	Tampa Bay Rowdies	0–3	1–3	x	August 15 • Pontiac Silverdome • 21,539; August 19 • Tampa Stadium • 27,210
Chicago Sting	-	Fort Lauderdale Strikers	2–0	1–0	x	August 15 • Soldier Field • 10,019; August 18 • Lockhart Stadium • 13,691
California Surf	-	San Diego Sockers	2–4	2–7	x	August 16 • Anaheim Stadium • 8,460; August 18 • San Diego Stadium • 10,225
Tulsa Roughnecks	-	Minnesota Kicks	2–1 (OT)	2–1 (OT)	x	August 15 • Skelly Stadium • 14,105; August 19 • Metropolitan Stadium • 28,996
Dallas Tornado	-	Vancouver Whitecaps	2–3	1 –2	x	August 15 • Ownby Stadium • 8,829; August 18 • Empire Stadium • 30,328
Los Angeles Aztecs	-	Washington Diplomats	3–1	4–3 (OT)	x	August 15 • Rose Bowl • 12,042; August 19 • RFK Stadium • 14,802
Toronto Blizzard	-	New York Cosmos	1–3	0–2	x	August 16 • Exhibition Stadium • 30,356; August 19 • Giants Stadium • 46,531

=== Conference semifinals ===
Lower seed		Higher seed	Game 1	Game 2	Mini-game	(lower seed hosts Game 1)
San Diego Sockers	-	Chicago Sting	2–0	1–0	x	August 22 • San Diego Stadium • 11,561; August 25 • Wrigley Field • 15,379
Los Angeles Aztecs	-	Vancouver Whitecaps	3–2 (SO, 2–1)	0–1	0–1	August 22 • Rose Bowl • 21,213; August 25 • Empire Stadium • 32,375
Philadelphia Fury	-	Tampa Bay Rowdies	2–3 (SO, 0–2)	0–1	x	August 23 • Franklin Field • 10,395; August 25 • Tampa Stadium • 21,112
Tulsa Roughnecks	-	New York Cosmos	3–0	0–3	1–3	August 23 • Skelly Stadium • 26,011; August 26 • Giants Stadium • 76,031

=== Conference Championships ===
Lower seed		Higher seed	Game 1	Game 2	Mini-game	(lower seed hosts Game 1)
Vancouver Whitecaps	-	New York Cosmos	2–0	2–3 (SO, 1–3)	1–0 (SO, 3–2)	August 29 • Empire Stadium • 32,875; September 1 • Giants Stadium • 44,109
San Diego Sockers	-	Tampa Bay Rowdies	2–1	2–3 (SO, 0–3)	0–1	August 30 • San Diego Stadium • 20,267; September 2 • Tampa Stadium • 38,766

=== Soccer Bowl '79 ===
September 8
2:00 pm EDT

Vancouver Whitecaps	2–1	Tampa Bay Rowdies
Whymark 12:37; Whymark 59:37 (Ball)		Van der Veen 22:25 (Anderson)

Giants Stadium, East Rutherford, NJ
Attendance: 50,699
Referee: Gino D'Ippolito (USA)

1979 NASL Champions: Vancouver Whitecaps

== Post season awards ==
- Most Valuable Player: (Netherlands) Johan Cruyff, Los Angeles
- Coach of the year: (Finland) Timo Liekoski, Houston
- Rookie of the year: (United States) Larry Hulcer, Los Angeles
- North American Player of the Year: (United States) Rick Davis, New York
- Playoff MVP: (England) Alan Ball, Vancouver

== Average home attendance ==
Team	Average
New York Cosmos	46,690
Tampa Bay Rowdies	28,546
Minnesota Kicks	24,580
Vancouver Whitecaps	22,962
Seattle Sounders	18,998
Tulsa Roughnecks	16,426
San Jose Earthquakes	15,092
Los Angeles Aztecs	14,334
Detroit Express	14,058
Fort Lauderdale Strikers	13,708
Washington Diplomats	11,973
Toronto Blizzard	11,821
San Diego Sockers	11,271
Portland Timbers	11,172
California Surf	10,330
Edmonton Drillers	9,924
Dallas Tornado	9,306
Rochester Lancers	8,680
Chicago Sting	8,062
Atlanta Chiefs	7,350
Memphis Rogues	7,137
New England Tea Men	6,562
Houston Hurricane	6,212
Philadelphia Fury	5,624
