= Stewart Jump =

English footballer

Personal information
- Full name: Stewart Jump
- Date of birth: 27 January 1952 (age 74)
- Place of birth: Crumpsall, Manchester, England
- Height: 5 ft 9 in (1.75 m)
- Position: Defender

Youth career
- 1965–1970: Stoke City

Senior career*
Years	Team	Apps	(Gls)
1970–1973	Stoke City	44	(1)
1973–1978	Crystal Palace	81	(2)
1977	→ Fulham (loan)	3	(0)
1975–1977	→ Tampa Bay Rowdies (loan)	60	(1)
1978–1980	Houston Hurricane	74	(2)
1978–1980	Houston Summit (indoor)	45	(28)
1980–1981	Minnesota Kicks	44	(1)
1981–1982	New Jersey Rockets (indoor)	32	(5)
1982–1983	Baltimore Blast (indoor)	43	(1)
1983–1984	Tacoma Stars (indoor)	17	(0)
Total		443	(41)
- * Club domestic league appearances and goals

Stewart Jump (born 27 January 1952) is an English former footballer in the Football League for Crystal Palace, Fulham and Stoke City. He also had a successful career playing in the United States, and was chosen as the MVP of the 1975 Soccer Bowl.

== Career ==
Jump was born in Manchester and joined Stoke City as an apprentice in 1965. He progressed through the youth ranks at the Victoria Ground and signed a professional contract in 1970. He made his debut against Coventry City in February 1971 and played in 12 First Division matches in 1970–71 scoring once against Blackpool. Jump played 33 games in 1971–72 and made 11 appearances in 1972–73. After playing just five matches in 1973–74 he was sold to Crystal Palace for £75,000.

Jump spent four seasons at Selhurst Park making 91 appearances scoring twice and he also played three matches for Fulham F.C. in 1977. He then decided to move to the United States to play for the Tampa Bay Rowdies in the North American Soccer League for the 1975, 1976 and 1977 summer seasons. In 1978, the Houston Hurricane of the NASL purchased Jump's contract from Crystal Palace. He played two seasons for the Hurricane. He then played for several Major Indoor Soccer League teams as well as the Minnesota Kicks.

== Career statistics ==
Appearances and goals by club, season and competition
Club	Season	League			FA Cup		League Cup		Other		Total	
Club	Season	Division	Apps	Goals	Apps	Goals	Apps	Goals	Apps	Goals	Apps	Goals
Stoke City	1970–71	First Division	12	1	0	0	0	0	2 (Note: Appearances in Anglo-Italian Cup)	1	14	2
Stoke City	1971–72	First Division	19	0	2	0	5	0	7 (Note: Four appearances in Anglo-Italian Cup and three in Texaco Cup)	0	33	0
Stoke City	1972–73	First Division	10	0	0	0	1	0	0	0	11	0
Stoke City	1973–74	First Division	3	0	0	0	1	0	1 (Note: Appearances in Texaco Cup)	0	5	0
Stoke City	Total		44	1	2	0	7	0	10	1	63	2
Crystal Palace	1973–74	Second Division	22	1	1	0	0	0	0	0	23	1
Crystal Palace	1974–75	Third Division	21	1	0	0	3	0	0	0	24	1
Crystal Palace	1975–76	Third Division	25	0	4	0	0	0	0	0	29	0
Crystal Palace	1976–77	Third Division	12	0	1	0	0	0	0	0	13	0
Crystal Palace	1977–78	Second Division	1	0	0	0	0	0	0	0	1	0
Crystal Palace	Total		81	2	7	0	3	0	0	0	91	2
Fulham (loan)	1976–77	Second Division	3	0	0	0	0	0	0	0	3	0
Tampa Bay Rowdies (loan)	1975	NASL	21	0	—		—		—		21	0
Tampa Bay Rowdies (loan)	1976	NASL	17	1	—		—		—		17	1
Tampa Bay Rowdies (loan)	1977	NASL	22	0	—		—		—		22	0
Tampa Bay Rowdies (loan)	Total		60	1	—		—		—		30	1
Houston Hurricane	1978	NASL	28	1	—		—		—		28	1
Houston Hurricane	1979	NASL	26	0	—		—		—		26	0
Houston Hurricane	1980	NASL	20	1	—		—		—		20	1
Houston Hurricane	Total		74	2	—		—		—		74	2
Minnesota Kicks	1980	NASL	12	0	—		—		—		12	0
Minnesota Kicks	1981	NASL	32	1	—		—		—		32	1
Minnesota Kicks	Total		44	1	—		—		—		44	1
Career Total			306	7	9	0	10	0	10	1	305	8
