= Alan Kelley =

English footballer

Personal information
- Date of birth: 24 December 1952 (age 73)
- Place of birth: Bootle, England
- Height: 5 ft 7 in (1.70 m)
- Position: Fullback

Youth career
- –1970: Southport

Senior career*
Years	Team	Apps	(Gls)
1970–1972	Southport	23	(2)
1972–1976	Crewe Alexandra	107	(0)
1977–1978	Los Angeles Aztecs	18	(1)
1979	San Diego Sockers	0	(0)
1980	California Surf	22	(1)
1980	California Surf (indoor)	14	(2)
1979–82	Philadelphia Fever (indoor)	108	(20)
1980	California Sunshine		
1980	Cleveland Cobras		
1982–85	Los Angeles Lazers (indoor)	138	(29)
Total		170	(4)
- * Club domestic league appearances and goals

Alan Kelley (born 24 December 1952) is an English former professional footballer who played as a fullback. Kelley, who was active in both England and the United States, made over 150 career appearances.

== Career ==
Born in Bootle, Kelley played in the Football League for Southport and Crewe Alexandra, and in the North American Soccer League for the Los Angeles Aztecs, the San Diego Sockers and the California Surf. He played for the California Sunshine and the Cleveland Cobras of the American Soccer League. Kelley also spent several years in the Major Indoor Soccer League playing for the Philadelphia Fever and the Los Angeles Lazers. In recent years, he has been a college assistant coach and a high school head coach in the South Bay area of Los Angeles County in southern California.
