= John Stremlau =

American soccer player

Personal information
- Date of birth: October 23, 1953 (age 73)
- Place of birth: St. Louis, Missouri, United States
- Positions: Forward; midfielder

Youth career
- 1972–1975: SIU-E

Senior career*
Years	Team	Apps	(Gls)
1976	Dallas Tornado	9	(1)
1977	St. Louis Stars	19	(1)
1978–1980	Houston Hurricane	66	(0)
1978–1980	Houston Summit (indoor)	56	(39)
1980–1983	St. Louis Steamers (indoor)	126	(21)
1983–1984	Kansas City Comets (indoor)	39	(9)
- * Club domestic league appearances and goals

John Stremlau is a retired U.S. soccer player who played five seasons in the North American Soccer League and at least six in the Major Indoor Soccer League.

== Player ==
=== College ===
Stremlau grew up in St. Louis, Missouri. He attended Southern Illinois University Edwardsville (SIU-E) where he played on the men's soccer team from 1972 to 1975. He finished his collegiate career ranked sixth on both the school's career goals and points lists with 33 and 91 respectively. He was elected to the SIUE Athletics Hall of Fame in 2007.

=== Professional ===
In 1976, Stremlau signed with the Dallas Tornado of the North American Soccer League (NASL). He moved to the St. Louis Stars for the 1977 season before moving again, this time to the Houston Hurricane in 1978. The Hurricane folded in 1980, but Stremlau was already an established indoor soccer player and he continued his career in that venue. When the Major Indoor Soccer League (MISL) began, the Houston franchise, known as Houston Summit. decided to import most of its players from the local NASL team, the Houston Hurricane. Stremlau joined the Summit and spent two indoor seasons with the team. In 1980, the Hurricane folded and the Summit moved to Baltimore. Stremlau moved to the St. Louis Steamers where he played three more seasons before being traded to the Kansas City Comets.

=== Olympic team ===
In 1975, Stremlau was part of the U.S. Olympic soccer team which attempted, but failed to qualify for the 1976 Summer Olympics. On April 20, 1975, he scored a goal in a 3–2 loss to Bermuda.

== Coach ==
Stremlau coaches youth soccer in St. Louis with the Busch Soccer Club.

In 2005, he was inducted into the St. Louis Soccer Hall of Fame.
