= Paul Hammond (footballer) =

English footballer

Personal information
- Date of birth: 26 July 1953 (age 73)
- Place of birth: Nottingham, England
- Position: Goalkeeper

Youth career
- 1970–1972: Crystal Palace

Senior career*
Years	Team	Apps	(Gls)
1972–1977	Crystal Palace	117	(0)
1975	→ Tampa Bay Rowdies (loan)	12	(0)
1977–1978	Tampa Bay Rowdies	32	(0)
1978–1980	Houston Hurricane	57	(0)
1978–1979	Houston Summit (indoor)	17	(0)
1979–1980	Hartford Hellions (indoor)	9	(0)
1980–1981	Seattle Sounders (indoor)	3	(0)
1981–1982	Seattle Sounders	40	(0)
1983	Team America	18	(0)
1984	Toronto Blizzard	21	(0)
1985–1988	Toronto Blizzard (NSL)	12+	(0)
1989	Hamilton Steelers	3	(0)

Managerial career
- 2006–2007: Bridport
- * Club domestic league appearances and goals

Paul Hammond is an English former professional association football goalkeeper who played professionally in England, the North American Soccer League and Major Indoor Soccer League.

== Playing career ==
On 13 January 1971, Hammond signed as an apprentice with English First Division club Crystal Palace. He remained in the Palace youth team until first team keeper, John Jackson was injured in 1972. While Hammond then became the starting keeper, his inexperience was a contributing factor to Palace's slide to the second division, then third division. In the midst of Palace's free fall through the English leagues, the team loaned Hammond to the Tampa Bay Rowdies of the North American Soccer League for off-season training.

The Rowdies were created in 1974 and began play in 1975. The new owners hired Eddie Firmani, an assistant with Palace, as the team's first head coach. Firmani brought over three Palace players, Stewart Jump, Mark Lindsay and Hammond for the 1975 season. Amazingly, the Rowdies won the league championship that season, with Hammond recording clean sheets in all three playoff games. He saved a penalty in the 1–0 quarter-final win over Toronto, and survived an onslaught of Portland shots in the Rowdies 2–0 Soccer Bowl victory. However, Hammond returned to Palace at the completion of the loan and was replaced by U.S. great Arnie Mausser. Although Mausser had been capped by the U.S. national team, and was selected as the top NASL goalkeeper for 1976, Firmani preferred Hammond and negotiated his purchase from Palace. Hammond made a total of 117 Football League appearances for Palace. At this time Palace was attempting to rebuild its team and used the funds from Hammond's sale to purchase striker Jeff Bourne from Derby County. Hammond played with the Rowdies through the 1977 season, but was traded to the Houston Hurricane after only eight games of the 1978 season. He then spent the 1979 and 1980 seasons in Houston, being named to the NASL second team All Star list in 1979. While in Houston, Hammond was introduced to professional indoor soccer when a new league, the Major Indoor Soccer League began operations in 1978–1979. Hammond played for the Houston Summit Soccer which drew many of its players from the NASL Hurricane. Hammond was selected as the Goalkeeper of the Year as the Summit ran to the best record only to fall to the champion New York Arrows in the playoff semifinals.

At the end of the 1980 season, the Hurricane folded and Hammond went to the Seattle Sounders dispersal sale. By this time Hammond had blossomed into an excellent keeper. In 1982, the Sounders went to the championship game, only to fall to the New York Cosmos by a score of 1–0. That year Hammond was ranked as the third best keeper in the league. At the end of the season, Hammond entered contract negotiations with the Sounders. However, other opportunities beckoned. He had gained his U.S. citizenship and the United States Soccer Federation had decided to enter the U.S. national team into the NASL. The team, fittingly known as Team America, drew on U.S. citizens playing in the NASL, MISL and the American Soccer League. However, many U.S. players were unwilling to leave their professional teams to play full-time for the national team. To make up a full roster, USSF allowed a limited number of non-U.S. citizens, such as Alan Green to join Team America. Hammond elected to leave the Sounders after they failed to meet his demands and signed with Team America. When Team America finished the 1983 season with a 10–20 record, the worst in the NASL, USSF withdrew the team from the league. At that point, Hammond moved to the Toronto Blizzard for the last season of the NASL. In 1984, Hammond achieved his greatest success in the NASL when he had the lowest goals-against average in the league. That gained him another Second Team All Star team selection. Hammond remained with the Blizzard for the 1985 season, which they played in the National Soccer League of Canada. He also played for the Hamilton Steelers.

== Managerial career ==
Hammond managed Bridport for the 2006–07 season.

== Honours ==
- Soccer Bowl '75
- Soccer Bowl '82 (runner-up)
- Soccer Bowl '84 (runner-up)

=== Individual ===
- MISL Goalkeeper of the Year: 1978–79
- All-MISL team: 1978–79 (second team)
- NASL All-Star: 1979 (second team)
- NASL All-Star: 1984 (second team)
