= Ian Anderson (Scottish footballer) =

Scottish footballer

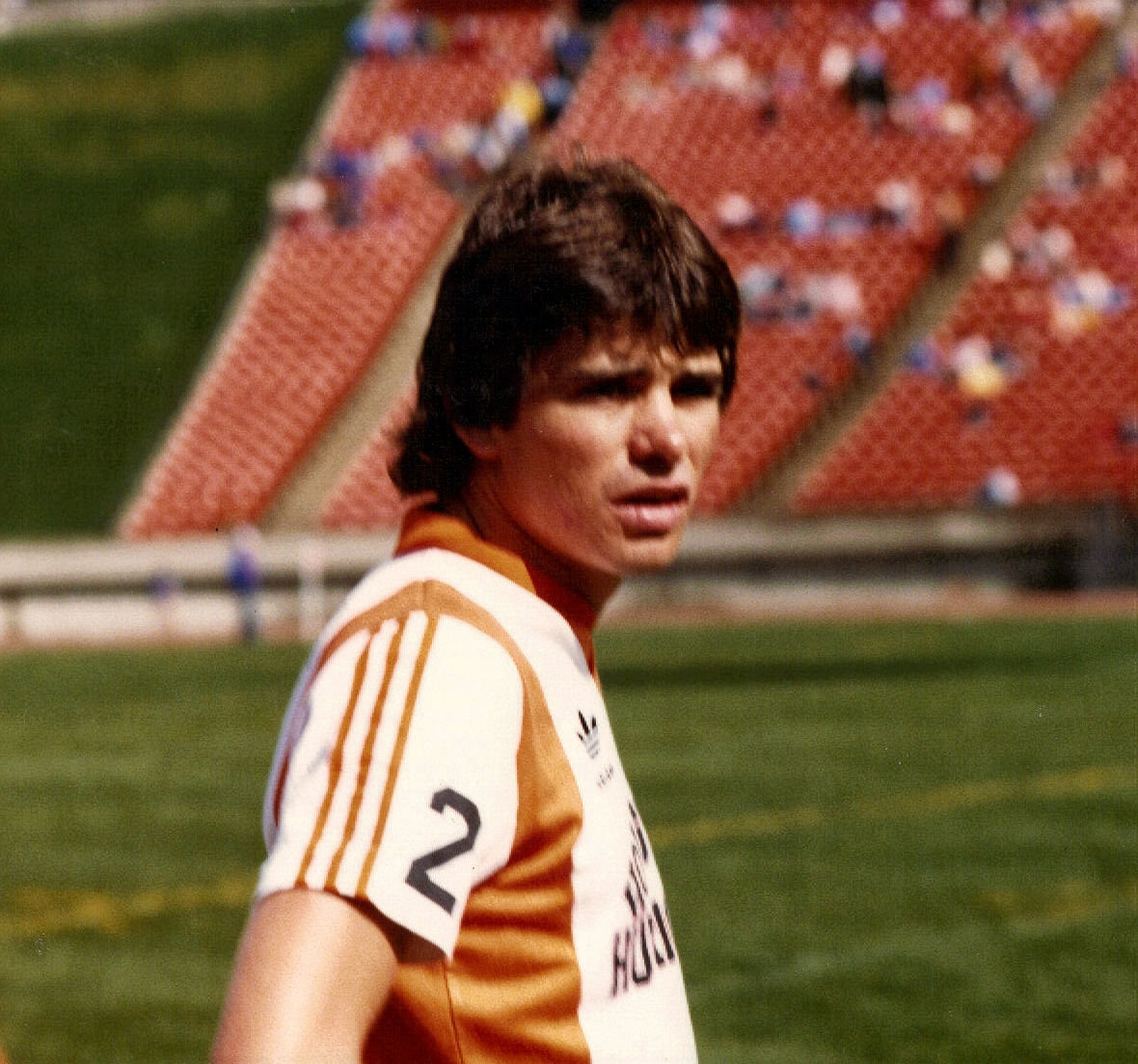
- Ian Anderson playing for Houston Hurricane

Personal information
- Date of birth: 11 September 1954
- Place of birth: Edinburgh, Scotland
- Date of death: 5 November 2008 (aged 54)
- Place of death: Edinburgh, Scotland
- Position: Defender

Senior career*
| Years | Team | Apps | (Gls) |
| 1972–1975 | Dundee | 27 | (4) |
| 1975–1978 | St Johnstone | 61 | (9) |
| 1977 | →Tampa Bay Rowdies (loan) | 11 | (2) |
| 1978–1980 | Houston Hurricane | 85 | (17) |
| 1978–1980 | Houston Summit (indoor) | 52 | (55) |
| 1981 | Tampa Bay Rowdies | 27 | (2) |
| 1980–1982 | Cleveland Force (indoor) | 85 | (64) |
| 1982 | New Jersey Rockets (indoor) | 39 | (18) |
| 1982–1983 | St. Louis Steamers (indoor) | 41 | (12) |
| 1983–1985 | Wichita Wings (indoor) | 86 | (15) |
| 1985–1986 | Canton Invaders (indoor) | | |

Managerial career
- 1982: New Jersey Rockets
- 1986–1987: Kansas Argyles
- * Club domestic league appearances and goals

Ian Anderson (11 September 1954 – 5 November 2008) was a Scottish professional football defender who spent most of his career playing in the United States.

Anderson began his professional career with Dundee when he was sixteen, his debut with the first team coming in August 1972. He moved to St Johnstone in December 1975. St Johnstone sent him on loan in 1977 to the Tampa Bay Rowdies of the North American Soccer League. In 1978, the Rowdies traded the American rights to Anderson to the Houston Hurricane in exchange for draft picks. Houston then purchased his contract from St Johnstone. That fall, the Houston Summit became a member of the Major Indoor Soccer League. The team was essentially the Houston Hurricane in an indoor guise. He was a 1978–1979 MISL All Star with Houston.

When both the Hurricane and Summit collapsed in 1980, Anderson signed with the Cleveland Force of MISL. In December 1980, the Rowdies selected Anderson in the NASL Dispersal Draft which included players from the disbanded Hurricane. While the team wanted him for the NASL indoor season, he remained with the Force for the rest of the season, garnering first team All Star honors. He returned to the Rowdies for the 1981 outdoor season before moving indoors permanently that fall with the Force.

On January 6, 1982, the New Jersey Rockets purchased Anderson from the Cleveland Force. and in February 1982, Anderson replaced the fired Timo Liekoski as head coach of the New Jersey Rockets. In 1983, he moved to the Wichita Wings, where he played two seasons. In October 1985, he signed with the Canton Invaders of the American Indoor Soccer Association. In 1986–1987, he coached the Kansas Argyles, an independent indoor soccer team.

Anderson died on 5 November 2008 at Western General Hospital in Edinburgh. He was survived by his wife, Jacqueline, and two adult children. His funeral service was held one week later in Mortonhall Crematorium Pentland Chapel, Edinburgh.
