= Santiago Formoso =

American soccer defender

Personal information
- Date of birth: July 4, 1953 (age 73)
- Place of birth: Vigo, Spain
- Height: 5 ft 9 in (1.75 m)
- Position: Defender

Youth career
- 1965–1969: Santa Mariña

College career
Years	Team	Apps	(Gls)
1974	Penn Quakers		

Senior career*
Years	Team	Apps	(Gls)
1976	Hartford Bicentennials	24	(0)
1977	Connecticut Bicentennials	25	(1)
1978–1979	New York Cosmos	43	(2)
1980	Los Angeles Aztecs	11	(0)
1980	Houston Hurricane	10	(0)
1981–1982	Buffalo Stallions (indoor)	5	(0)
1982–1983	Carolina Lightnin'		
1984	Charlotte Gold		
1985	Greek American AA		

International career
1976–1977	United States	7	(0)
- * Club domestic league appearances and goals

Santiago Formoso (born July 4, 1953) is an American soccer defender who spent five seasons in the North American Soccer League. He also earned seven caps with the U.S. national team in 1976 and 1977.

== Club career ==
Santiago Formoso was born in Vigo, Spain, 1953. He emigrated to the United States in 1969, following his father, a merchant seaman. He established in Newark, New Jersey, and attended Kearny High School, graduating in 1973. He also played with Newark Beira-Mar. His father became a cook in Long Island, while his mother worked in a clothing factory. His father died of cancer in 1974.

After high school, Formoso attended the University of Pennsylvania where he played on the men's soccer team. While at university, he became a U.S. citizen. In 1976, Formoso left the university and signed with the Hartford Bicentennials of the North American Soccer League (NASL). The team moved from Hartford to New Haven, Connecticut between the 1976 and 1977 seasons, making a name change with the move. At the end of the 1977 season, the Bicentennials relocated to Oakland, California and Formoso decided to terminate his contract to remain close to his mother. Next, he joined the New York Cosmos. He spent two seasons in New York before being traded to the Los Angeles Aztecs. However, he played only eleven games of the 1980 season before moving to the Houston Hurricane for the last ten games of that season. In 1982, he played for the Carolina Lightnin' in the American Soccer League. In 1984, he played for the Charlotte Gold in the United Soccer League. With the collapse of the USL, Formoso moved north to play for Greek American AA in the Cosmopolitan Soccer League.

== International career ==
In 1975, while at the university, Formoso was called into the U.S. Olympic soccer team as it ran through the qualification campaign for the 1976 Summer Olympics. However, two losses to Mexico in August 1975 kept the U.S. out of the Olympics. Formoso was on the American team at the 1975 Pan American Games.

Formoso earned his first of seven caps with the U.S. national team on October 3, 1976. That game, a qualifier for the 1978 FIFA World Cup ended in a scoreless tie with Mexico. Formoso's next game with the national team did not end so well when the U.S. lost 3–0 twelve days later to Mexico in Puebla. Formoso then played in two friendlies with Haiti before playing in the U.S. loss to Canada on December 22, 1976, which bumped the U.S. from contention for the World Cup finals. Formoso played two games in 1977, his last was a 1–0 victory over China on October 10, 1977.

== After retirement ==
=== MetroStars ===
Formoso was also a part of the MetroStars marketing department from at least 1988 until his firing in 2001.

== Honors ==
Formoso was inducted into the Hudson County, New Jersey Sports Hall of Fame in 1995.
