= Tony Crudo =

American soccer player

Personal information
- Full name: Anthony Crudo
- Date of birth: March 25, 1959 (age 67)
- Place of birth: Seattle, Washington, United States
- Position: Defender

Youth career
- 1976: Shorecrest High School

Senior career*
Years	Team	Apps	(Gls)
1977–1979	Tampa Bay Rowdies	19	(0)
1978–1979	Tampa Bay Rowdies (indoor)	12	(2)
1979–1981	California Surf	45	(1)
1979–1981	California Surf (indoor)	24	(0)
1981–1982	Seattle Sounders (indoor)	17	(3)
1982	Seattle Sounders	3	(0)

International career
1979–1982	United States	7	(0)
- * Club domestic league appearances and goals

Anthony John Crudo (born March 25, 1959, in Seattle, Washington) is a former U.S. soccer defender who spent five seasons in the North American Soccer League. He also earned seven caps with the U.S. national team between 1979 and 1982.

== Youth ==
In 1968 played for Federal Way Boys Club. In 1969 moved to Shoreline and played for Lake City Blue Barons (coached by his dad Ray Crudo). Crudo attended Shorecrest High School in Shoreline, Washington, where he was a member of the school's 1976 state championship soccer team.

== NASL ==
Crudo signed with the Tampa Bay Rowdies of the North American Soccer League (NASL) in the fall of 1977. He saw no regular-season outdoor games that year, but did play in an exhibition game against China on October 13, 1977. In 1979, he played the first seven games of the season in Tampa Bay before being traded to the California Surf in July. During the 1980–81 NASL indoor season, Crudo played 13 games. He continued with the Surf until the end of 1981 when the Surf folded. In October 1981, the Seattle Sounders purchased his contract. He played only three games during the 1982 season. He left the NASL at the end of the season.

== National team ==
Crudo played seven times with the U.S. national team between 1979 and 1982. His first caps came in a 6–0 loss to France on May 2, 1979. He played on World Cup qualifier, a loss to Canada on November 1, 1980. His last game with the national team came on March 21, 1982, a victory over Trinidad and Tobago.

== Coaching ==
Crudo continues to live in Washington where he is a special education teacher, the boys and girls soccer coach at Fife High School, and the Girls Sparta 99 coach.
