= Mark Moran (soccer) =

American soccer player

Personal information
- Date of birth: September 26, 1954 (age 72)
- Place of birth: St. Louis, Missouri, U.S.
- Height: 5 ft 11 in (1.80 m)
- Position: Midfielder

Youth career
- 1973–1976: SIU Edwardsville Cougars

Senior career*
Years	Team	Apps	(Gls)
1977–1981	Minnesota Kicks	74	(3)
1979–1981	Minnesota Kicks (indoor)	30	(7)
- * Club domestic league appearances and goals

Mark Moran (born September 26, 1954) is an American retired soccer midfielder who played in the North American Soccer League.

In 1973, Moran graduated from St. Thomas Aquinas-Mercy High School in St. Louis, Missouri. He then attended Southern Illinois University, Edwardsville, playing on the men's soccer team from 1973 to 1976. In 1977, he turned professional with the Minnesota Kicks of the North American Soccer League. He played five outdoor and two indoor seasons in Minnesota. After ending his soccer career he moved back to St. Louis, MO, and began a career as a CRNA. He remains there with his wife and children, and continues to help coach in his grandkids' soccer leagues.
