= Matt O'Sullivan (soccer) =

American soccer player (born 1955)

Personal information
- Date of birth: July 1, 1955 (age 71)
- Place of birth: San Francisco, California, U.S.
- Position: Defender

Youth career
- Chico State Wildcats

Senior career*
Years	Team	Apps	(Gls)
1976	Seattle Sounders		
1978–1980	Houston Hurricane	63	(0)
1978–1979	Houston Hurricane (indoor)		
1978–1980	Houston Summit (indoor)	29	(7)
1981–1984	Memphis Americans (indoor)	107	(11)
- * Club domestic league appearances and goals

Matt O'Sullivan is an American retired soccer player who played professionally in the Major Indoor Soccer League and North American Soccer League.

== Youth ==
O'Sullivan grew up in the San Francisco Bay Area and was introduced to soccer while living in La Honda. His first team was the La Honda Bandits which played in the Northern California division of the American Youth Soccer Organization (AYSO). O'Sullivan's father, Tommy, was one of the founding members of the Northern California division of the AYSO. O'Sullivan attended the Woodside Priory School in Portola Valley and was named All American his senior year. Matt played three years with the Juventus Soccer Club of Redwood City during which two state championships, as well as two trips to the final eight of the McGuire Cup, were achieved. O'Sullivan attended Chico State University where he played on the men's soccer team as a starter for all four years playing in the first Collegiate Division Two Soccer Championship. He was a 1974 and 1975 Honorable Mention All American and was inducted into the Wildcat's Hall of Fame in 1996. O'Sullivan was a member of the 1976 Olympic Soccer Team playing in several international matches and qualifying games and a member of the U.S. National 'B' Team in 1977 which travelled and played in South Korea.

== Professional ==
In 1976, Seattle Sounders selected O'Sullivan in the first round of the North American Soccer League draft. In 1977, he signed with the Houston Hurricane, playing three outdoor seasons. He also went on loan with the Houston Summit of the Major Indoor Soccer League for two indoor seasons. He played 3 seasons with the Memphis Americans retiring from professional soccer in 1984.
