= Steve Newman (soccer) =

American soccer player and coach

Personal information
- Date of birth: December 29, 1953
- Place of birth: Seattle, Washington, United States
- Date of death: October 12, 2012 (aged 58)
- Place of death: United States
- Position: Forward

Senior career*
Years	Team	Apps	(Gls)
1977–1978	Dallas Tornado	0	(0)
1978	Indianapolis Daredevils	19	(14)
1978–1979	Cleveland Force (indoor)	7	(0)
1979	Seattle Sounders	1	(0)
1980	Columbus Magic		
- * Club domestic league appearances and goals

Steve Newman (December 29, 1953 – October 12, 2012) was an American soccer forward who played professionally in the North American Soccer League and American Soccer League.

He spent two seasons with the Dallas Tornado in the North American Soccer League, but never cracked the first team. In 1978, he played for the Indianapolis Daredevils of the American Soccer League. In 1979, he played one game for the Seattle Sounders. He was the head coach of the Mercer Island High School boys' soccer team where he was the 2005 and 2009 King County 3A/2A Coach of the Year.

Newman died of a heart attack on October 12, 2012.
