= Gary Allison =

American soccer player

Personal information
- Date of birth: October 14, 1952 (age 74)
- Place of birth: Munich, West Germany
- Position: Goalkeeper

Youth career
- 1969–1972: Westmont College

Senior career*
Years	Team	Apps	(Gls)
1973–1974	Dallas Tornado	1	(0)
1975	Los Angeles Aztecs	10	(0)
1976–1977	Sacramento Spirits		
1978–1979	San Diego Sockers	1	(0)
1979–1980	Cleveland Force (indoor)	25	(0)
1980–1981	Chicago Horizon (indoor)	25	(0)
1981–1982	Pittsburgh Spirit (indoor)	20	(0)
1982–1983	Los Angeles Lazers (indoor)	12	(0)
1983–1984	Buffalo Stallions (indoor)	13	(0)
- * Club domestic league appearances and goals

Gary Allison is a German retired-born American soccer player. This outstanding goalkeeper played professionally, for 12 years, from 1973 to 1984, in the NASL (North American Soccer League), ASL(American Soccer League) and MISL( Major Indoor Soccer League) after attending Westmont College (1969–1972) in Santa Barbara, Ca.

Allison was born in 1952 in Munich, Germany but raised in Fuerstenfeldbruck. In 1960, he was adopted by an American military family and became a US citizen. He attended Bitburg H.S. in Germany (received All-Conference award for Europe) and graduated in 1969 from Wasson H.S. in Colorado Springs, Co. He attended Westmont College where he helped guide the Warriors to a National Championship (NAIA) in 1972.

== College ==
Allison attended and played 4 yrs. at Westmont College, in Santa Barbara, Ca. His stellar intercollegiate career was capped in 1972 when he was named MVP of the national tournament in winning the National Championship. Subsequently, he was chosen to the first ever Senior Bowl (he was the starting keeper for the West Squad), and named runner-up for Soccer Player of the Year honors. Additionally he was nominated for All-America honors, All-West Coast –all 4 years, and twice to the NAIA all-tournament team. He was named, twice, as Santa Barbara outstanding soccer player, in ’71 and ’72. His collegiate career was capped by being inducted into the NAIA Hall of Fame in 1986. In 1973, he was drafted by the Dallas Tornado of the NASL.

== Professional ==
In 1973, he signed with the Dallas Tornado of the North American Soccer League. He played in only several games(international) over two seasons. In 1975, he was traded to the Los Angeles Aztecs in return for 8 players. He achieved the starters role until an injury cut his season short. After a lengthy recovery, he joined the Sacramento Spirits (in the American Soccer League)where he played in 1976-1977 . In 1977, he led the league with the lowest goals against average and was named to the All-Star team. In 1978, he returned to the NASL to play for the San Diego Sockers and saw limited action due to injuries. In 1979, he joined the MISL (Major Indoor Soccer League)where he would play a single season each year, before injuries knocked him out of the starting roles in Cleveland Force, Chicago Horizon, Pittsburgh Spirit, Los Angeles Lazers and Buffalo Stallions, and finally a career-ending injury in Buffalo in 1984. He was a unanimous selection to the MISL All-Star team in 1981 while playing for the Chicago Horizon. He retired in 1984 due to an injury after 12 years in the pro's.

== Business ==
Allison died July 6, 2023, and is survived by his wife, Ruth, stepson, Daniel, and daughters, Cynthia Natalie Allison and Stella Lu Allison.
