= Freddie Garcia =

Mexican footballer (born 1952)

Personal information
- Date of birth: July 7, 1952 (age 74)
- Place of birth: Guanajuato, Mexico
- Position: Forward

Senior career*
Years	Team	Apps	(Gls)
1973–1979	Dallas Tornado	37	(3)
1978–1979	Cleveland Force (indoor)	6	(3)
1979–1980	Wichita Wings (indoor)	29	(11)
- * Club domestic league appearances and goals

Freddie Garcia (born 7 July 1952) is a Mexican former footballer who played as a forward. He spent seven seasons in the North American Soccer League and two in the Major Indoor Soccer League.

Born in Mexico, Garcia grew up in the United States. In 1973, he signed with the Dallas Tornado of the North American Soccer League. He would play seven seasons with the Tornado, the last in 1979. He also played two seasons in the Major Indoor Soccer League, the 1978–79 season with the Cleveland Force and the 1979–1980 season with the Wichita Wings.
