= Woody Hartman =

American soccer player and coach

Personal information
- Date of birth: June 25, 1954 (age 72)
- Place of birth: Philadelphia, Pennsylvania, U.S.
- Height: 5 ft 10 in (1.78 m)
- Position: Goalkeeper

Youth career
- 1987: Temple Owls

Senior career*
Years	Team	Apps	(Gls)
1976	New Jersey Americans		
1978–1981	Philadelphia Fever (indoor)	42	(0)

Managerial career
- 1976–1980: Father Judge High School
- 1984–1992: Philadelphia Textile (assistant)
- 1993–1996: Drexel Dragons (assistant)
- 1996–1997: Philadelphia KiXX (assistant)
- 1997–2009: Drexel Dragons (assistant)
- 2015: Cairn Highlanders (assistant)
- * Club domestic league appearances and goals

Woody Hartman is an American retired soccer goalkeeper and coach. He played professionally in the American Soccer League, leading the league in saves in 1976, and the Major Indoor Soccer League. He also coached at the collegiate and professional levels.

Hartman graduated from Frankford High School. He attended Temple University, where he played on the men's soccer team from 1972 to 1974. In 1976, Hartman turned professional with the New Jersey Americans of the American Soccer League. He led the league in saves. That fall, he began his coaching career as head coach of the Father Judge High School soccer team, a position he held until 1980. In 2006, Father Judge High School inducted Hartman into its Hall of Honor. He did not play professionally again until 1978 when he signed with the Philadelphia Fever of the Major Indoor Soccer League. He spent three seasons with the Fever. In 1984, Hartman became the assistant coach to Lew Meehl at Philadelphia Textile. In 1993, both Meehl and Hartman moved to Drexel University. On September 26, 1996, Hartman left Drexel to become the goalkeeper coach for the Philadelphia KiXX of the National Professional Soccer League. In 1997, he returned to Drexel as an assistant to Meehl.
