= Jim Pollihan =

American soccer player & coach (born 1954)

Personal information
- Full name: James Pollihan
- Date of birth: February 13, 1954 (age 72)
- Place of birth: St. Louis, Missouri, United States
- Position: Defender

Youth career
- 1970–1975: Quincy University

Senior career*
| Years | Team | Apps | (Gls) |
| 1976–1980 | Rochester Lancers | 131 | (6) |
| 1978–1979 | New York Arrows (indoor) | 23 | (10) |
| 1979–1980 | Houston Summit (indoor) | 21 | (12) |
| 1980–1984 | Baltimore Blast (indoor) | 141 | (13) |

International career
| 1976–1979 | United States | 15 | (0) |

Managerial career
- 1986–1991: Baltimore Blast (assistant)
- 1991–1999: Harrisburg Heat
- * Club domestic league appearances and goals

James Pollihan is a former U.S. soccer player who was an outstanding collegiate forward with Quincy University but moved to defense as a professional. He earned fifteen caps with the U.S. national team between 1976 and 1979.

== Player ==
=== College ===
Pollihan starred as a forward with the Quincy University soccer team between 1972 and 1976. Quincy played in the NAIA where it dominated the men's soccer competition from the late 1960s through the 1980s. In 1970, Pollihan's first year with the team, Quincy, went to the championship game where it fell to Davis and Elkins College. Pollihan was selected to the All Tournament team. Beginning in 1973, Quincy went on a tear, winning the next three titles. Pollihan was named the tournament's Outstanding Forward in 1973, 1974 and 1975. He added to his honors when he was selected as the tournament MVP in 1974. In addition, he was an NAIA second team All American in 1974 and an Honorable Mention in 1975. In 1982, the NAIA inducted Pollihan into its soccer Hall of Fame. He has also been inducted into the Quincy University Hall of Fame.

=== Professional ===
On January 14, 1976, the Rochester Lancers of the North American Soccer League (NASL) drafted Pollihan in the first round of the NASL College Draft. The Los Angeles Skyhawks of the American Soccer League also drafted Pollihan, but he signed with the Lancers. Pollihan spent five seasons with the Lancers until the team folded at the end of the 1980 season. In 1978, the New York Arrows of Major Indoor Soccer League (MISL) began to prepare for both the team's and the league's first season. Rather than building a roster from scratch, the team decided to sign the Rochester Lancers players as its team.

In 1977, he was named to the Rochester Lancers Team of the Decade. On December 22, 1978, the Arrows played the Cincinnati Kids in the league's first game. Pollihan, despite being a defender, scored the game's, the team's, and the league's first goal. Pollihan won the league championship with the Arrows that season, then went on to spend another five seasons in the MISL. He played from 1979 to 1980 with the Houston Summit and from 1980 to 1984 with the Baltimore Blast.

=== National team ===
Pollihan earned fifteen caps with the U.S. national team between 1976 and 1979. His first game came when he started a September 24, 1976 tie with Canada. He played one more game a month later, then did not appear for the U.S. again for another year. He played in about half the U.S. games through 1977 and 1979. His last cap came in a crushing 6–0 loss to France on May 2, 1979.

== Coaching ==
Pollihan was an assistant coach with the Baltimore Blast as early as the fall of 1986. He resigned from the Blast on August 16, 1991, in order to become the head coach of the Harrisburg Heat. In 1991, the Harrisburg Heat an expansion franchise with the National Professional Soccer League (NPSL) hired Pollihan as the club's first coach. He took the Heat into the playoffs each of his seven seasons as head coach. In 1995, the Heat went to the championship series only to fall to the St. Louis Ambush. Pollihan was also the 1991–1992 NPSL Coach of the Year. After handing over the coaching reins to Richard Chinapoo in 1999, Pollihan moved into the team's front office as the Vice President of Soccer Operations, a position he held until January 2003. He is fourth on the NPSL list of coaching victories with 155.
