= Houston Summit =

Defunct indoor soccer team

Houston Summit were a professional indoor soccer team that operated from 1978 to 1980. They played in the original Major Indoor Soccer League. In 1980, the franchise was moved to Baltimore to become the Baltimore Blast. Their roster mainly included players from the Houston NASL, the Houston Hurricane. During the two seasons that the Summit played in Houston, the average home attendance was 2,749. The team was named for its home arena.

== Season-by-season ==
Season	Record	Regular season	Playoffs
1978–79	18–6	1st	Lost Semifinals to Philadelphia Fever
1979–80	20–12	1st, Central Division	Lost MISL Finals to New York Arrows

== Honors ==
MISL Championships
- runner-up: (1979–80)

MISL Regular Season Prmiereships

- (1978–79)

MISL Division Championships

- Central Division: (1979–80)

MISL Coach Of The Year

- Timo Liekoski (1978–79)

MISL Goalkeeper of the Year

- Paul Hammond (1978–79)
- Sepp Gantenhammer (1979–80)

MISL Leading Goalkeeper

- Paul Hammond (1978–79)
- Sepp Gantenhammer (1979–80)
All-MISL: First Team
- Kai Haaskivi (1978–79, 1979–80)
- Ian Anderson (1978–79)

All-MISL: Second Team

- Paul Hammond (1978–79)
- Stewart Jump (1978–79)

All-MISL: Honorable Mention

- Mick Poole (1979–80)
- Jim Pollihan (1979–80)

MISL All-Star Game Selections: First Team

- Mick Poole (1979–80)
- Ian Anderson (1979–80)
- Kai Haaskivi (1979–80)

MISL All-Star Game Selections: Second Team

- Stewart Jump (1979–80)
- John Stremlau (1979–80)
