= Luis Papandrea =

Argentine association football player

Personal information
- Full name: Luis Héctor Papandrea
- Date of birth: 8 August 1952 (age 74)
- Place of birth: Buenos Aires, Argentina
- Position: Defender

Senior career*
Years	Team	Apps	(Gls)
1972-1977	Ferro Carril Oeste	118	(13)
1976	→ Racing (loan)	25	(0)
1978	Tampa Bay Rowdies (indoor)	1	(0)
1978	Tampa Bay Rowdies	15	(0)
1979-1981	Platense	25	(0)
1982	Central Norte	8	(0)

Managerial career
- Ferro Carril Oeste (assistant)
- Lone Star Soccer Club
- * Club domestic league appearances and goals

Luis Héctor Papandrea (born 8 August 1952) is an Argentine retired professional footballer who played as a defender.

== Playing career ==
Papandrea made his professional debut for Ferro Carril Oeste on 26 March 1972, at age 19. He would go on to make 118 appearances for the club. In 1976 he was loaned to Racing, where he played 25 games. After a return to Ferro in 1977, he received a free release on 31 December 1977.

In March 1978 he was invited to the United States for a two-week trial with the Tampa Bay Rowdies of the North American Soccer League. Rowdies’ coach Gordon Jago like what he saw and signed him after only six days. Papandrea made 15 appearances and 13 starts that season, helping Tampa Bay to Soccer Bowl '78.

Having been released from Tampa Bay in October after the season ended, he returned to Argentina, and joined First Division side Platense for three years. In 1982, he finished out his career with Central Norte.

== Post-playing career ==
After retiring, Papandrea joined the coaching staff of Ferro. He later served as assessor for Estudiantes, and as the general coordinator for Los Cardales Club. Ultimately he returned to the United States, and has been coaching at the youth development level in Austin, Texas since 1993.

== Personal life ==
Papandrea was born and raised in Buenos Aires, Argentina. He is of Greek and Italian heritage through his great-grandparents. His younger brother Ruben also played at Ferro. He and his wife Susana were married in 1973 and have three children. Papandrea stated in a 1978 interview that in Greek his last name means very manly.

== Honors ==
- North American Soccer League
  - Soccer Bowl '78: Finalist
