= Timo Liekoski =

Finnish footballer and manager (born 1942)

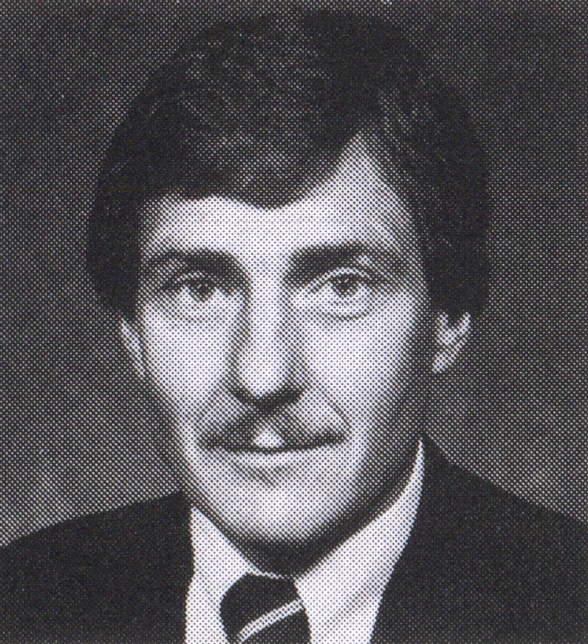
- Liekoski circa 1984

Personal information
- Date of birth: 30 June 1942 (age 84)
- Place of birth: Helsinki, Finland
- Position: Goalkeeper

College career
Years	Team	Apps	(Gls)
1964	SUNY New Paltz Hawks		
1966–1969	Hartwick Hawks		

Senior career*
Years	Team	Apps	(Gls)
1964	Kingston Kickers		

Managerial career
- 1972: Milwaukee Panthers
- 1973–1975: Hartwick Hawks
- 1976–1977: Dallas Tornado (assistant)
- 1978–1979: Houston Hurricane
- 1978–1979: Houston Summit
- 1980–1981: Edmonton Drillers
- 1981–1982: New Jersey Rockets
- 1982–1988: Cleveland Force
- 1988–1992: Canton Invaders
- 1991–1994: United States (assistant)
- 1994–1995: United States U23
- 1995–1996: Columbus Crew
- 1997: MYPA
- 1999: Finland Futsal
- Finland U-17
- * Club domestic league appearances and goals

Timo Liekoski (born June 30, 1942) is a Finnish soccer coach who managed teams in the North American Soccer League, Major Indoor Soccer League, American Indoor Soccer Association and Major League Soccer. He currently holds a variety of coaching positions with the Football Association of Finland. Liekoski is the only individual to have served as a head coach in all four major professional soccer leagues in the United States.

== Player ==
A native of Finland, Liekoski was drafted into the Finnish army when he was eighteen. After completing his service two years later, he moved to the United States. In 1964, Liekoski was working as a dishwasher when Al Miller noticed him watching Miller and his teammates practicing. At the time Miller played for the amateur Kingston Kickers and coached at the State University of New York at New Paltz. Miller invited Liekoski, a goalkeeper, to join the Kingston Kickers. After Liekoski proved his worth, Miller then recruited him into the New Paltz State soccer team. Miller moved to Hartwick College after Liekoski's freshman season, and took Liekoski with him. Liekoski sat out a season, per NCAA rules, then played his sophomore and junior seasons as the Warriors starting goalkeeper. After breaking his wrist during the preseason to his senior year, Liekoski moved to defender where he was a second team All American. He graduated in 1971 with a bachelor's degree in economics and later earned a master's degree in education from Whittier College.

== Coach ==
=== College ===
Liekoski began his coaching career in 1972 when he served as the first head coach of the University of Wisconsin–Milwaukee soccer team. In 1973, Liekoski replaced Miller as head coach of the Hartwick College men's soccer team. He lasted only two seasons and compiled a 30–9–7 record. He took the Hawks to the 1974 NCAA Final Four and was inducted into the Hartwick College Athletic Hall of Fame in 1995.

During his two seasons at Hartwick, Liekoski compiled a 30–9–7 record, and the 1974 team advanced to the NCAA tournament's national semifinals.

=== Professional ===
In 1976, Miller became head coach of the Dallas Tornado of the North American Soccer League. He brought Liekoski in as an assistant that year. In 1978, he became the head coach of the Houston Hurricane. That fall, Liekoski became the head coach of the Houston Summit, a team in the newly established Major Indoor Soccer League. He took the Summit to a league leading 18–6 record and gained MISL Coach of the Year honors. He followed this in 1979 when he coached the Hurricane to an unexpected 22–8 record and was named the 1979 NASL Coach of the Year. The Edmonton Drillers hired Liekoski in 1980. Liekoski took the team, which had finished the 1979 season at 8–22 to 17–15 in 1980. He then took the Drillers to the 1980–1981 NASL indoor championship. However, when Edmonton began the 1981 season at 6–12, the team fired him on June 22, 1981. In September 1981, the expansion New Jersey Rockets hired Liekoski. In February 1982, the Rockets fired him after the team started with a 4–13 record. In July 1982, the Cleveland Force hired Liekoski. He coached the Force until July 1988 when the team folded. On September 26, 1988, the Canton Invaders of the American Indoor Soccer Association signed Liekoski to a one-year contract, with an option for a second year. He took the Invaders to the 1989 and 1990 championships.

=== U.S. national team ===
In August 1991, Bora Milutinovic, head coach of the U.S. national team brought in Liekoski as his assistant in preparation for a series of European games. He returned to coach the Invaders as they began the 1991–1992 season, but took a leave of absence in January 1992 to rejoin the national team. In June 1992, he left the Invaders and became a full-time assistant to Milutinovic. In 1994, Milutinovic and his staff took the national team to the second round of the 1994 FIFA World Cup. In October 1994, he was named as head coach of the U.S. Olympic soccer team as it prepared for the 1996 Summer Olympics. After losing three games without scoring a goal at the 1995 Pan American games, then finishing ninth at the 1995 World University Games, Liekoski was fired in September 1995.

=== Professional ===
On December 5, 1995, the Columbus Crew of Major League Soccer hired Liekoski as the team's first coach. On August 3, 1996, Liekoski resigned after the Crew began the season at 6–16. He then returned to Finland where he coached Myllykosken Pallo in 1997.

=== Finland national team ===
In 1998, he was hired by the Football Association of Finland and has held a variety of national coaching positions. In 1999, he coached the Finland national futsal team. He also headed the Finland national under-17 football team.
