= New Jersey Rockets (MISL) =

The New Jersey Rockets were an indoor soccer team based in East Rutherford, New Jersey that played in the Major Indoor Soccer League for the 1981–82 season. Their home arena was the Brendan Byrne Arena, now known as the Meadowlands Arena. One of the owners was Timothy Sullivan, who was later asked if he wanted to be a part-owner of the New Jersey Devils, to which he replied, "hockey is too big a risk." The Rockets' average attendance for their one season of play was 6,565.

== Head coaches ==
- (Finland) Timo Liekoski (1981–1982)
- (Scotland) Ian Anderson (1982)
