= Houston Hurricane =

Defunct American soccer club

- Full name: Houston Hurricane
- Nickname: Hurricane
- Founded: 1978
- Dissolved: 1980
- Stadium: Astrodome
- Capacity: 45,000
- Chairman: Hans Von Mende
- Head coach: Timo Liekoski; Eckhard Krautzun
- League: NASL
Home colors	Away colors

The Houston Hurricane was a soccer team based out of Houston that played in the NASL. They played from 1978 to 1980. Their home field was the Astrodome. Their colors were orange, white and red.

== History ==
The team was the last of six expansion teams granted for the 1978 season and had about three months to sign players and sell tickets. Though the coach, Timo Liekoski, who had been an assistant with the Dallas Tornado, was capable, assembling a competitive team in so short a time would be daunting. In any case, the Hurricane placed last in its first season with ten wins of thirty matches (there were no draws in the NASL) and drew a miserable average attendance of 5,806, with only the Chicago Sting and San Diego Sockers drawing less in the 24-team league.

In the 1979 season, the Hurricane produced the second best record in the league, winning the division with 22 wins in thirty matches. Timo Liekoski was awarded Coach of the Year honors. But the Hurricane couldn't replicate those results in the playoffs, losing to the Philadelphia Fury in two straight. Average attendance was better at 6,211 but was still next to last in the league - the worst being Philadelphia. Kyle Rote, Jr. had joined the Hurricane that season, but left the team after the season on a relief mission to Cambodia and later retired from soccer.

The Hurricane didn't do as well in what turned out to be their final season, placing second in the division and again losing in the playoffs versus the Edmonton Drillers. They won fourteen and lost eighteen in the expanded schedule, and attendance fell to 5,818 a match, with only the Atlanta Chiefs and, again, Philadelphia being the only teams with worse gates. The Hurricane's Denver-based owners had had enough, and the team folded in late 1980.

== Year-by-year ==
Year	League	W	L	Pts	Reg. season	Playoffs	Attendance
1978 Skelly	NASL indoor	0	2	N/A	4th	N/A	1,750 (est)
1978 Schlitz	NASL indoor	2	0	20	2nd, runners-up	N/A	4,278
1978	NASL	10	20	96	4th, American Conference, Central Division	did not qualify	7,750
1979	NASL	22	8	187	1st, American Conference, Central Division	Lost Conference Quarterfinal (Philadelphia)	6,212
1979–80	NASL Indoor	did not enter					
1980	NASL	14	18	130	2nd, American Conference, Central Division	Lost 1st Round (Edmonton)	5,818

== Honors ==
Regular Season Premiership

- 1979: runner-up

Division titles

- 1979: Central Division, American Conference

Coach of the Year

- 1979: Timo Liekoski

FIFA World Cup players

- 1966: (Switzerland) Fritz Künzli

All-Star Selections

- 1979: Paul Hammond (second team)

Indoor Tournament MVP

- 1978: Mark Lindsay

Indoor All-Tournament Team

- 1978: Dale Russell

U.S. Soccer Hall of Fame members

- 2009: Kyle Rote Jr.

Indoor Soccer Hall of Fame members

- 2013 Kai Haaskivi
- 2019 Timo Liekoski
