= 1981–82 Tampa Bay Rowdies indoor season =

Tampa Bay Rowdies
1981–82 indoor season
- Owner: (United States) George Strawbridge, Jr. (United States) Lamar Hunt (United States) Bill McNutt
- President: (United States) Chas Serednesky, Jr
- Manager: (England) Gordon Jago
- Stadium: Bayfront Center
- NASL: Division: 2nd Playoffs: Finalists
- Top goalscorer: League: (Brazil) Tatu (21 goals); All: (Brazil) Tatu (30 goals)
- Highest home attendance: 6,122 (Feb. 12 vs. New York)
- Lowest home attendance: 4,625 (Feb. 3 vs. Jacksonville)
- Average home league attendance: 5,347
- Biggest win: 10–3 (Feb. 6 @ New York)
- Biggest defeat: 3–9 (Dec 13 @ Toronto)
Home colors	Away colors

The 1981–82 Tampa Bay Rowdies indoor season was the eighth indoor season of the club's existence.

== Overview ==
As in previous years, all home games were played at the Bayfront Center in St. Petersburg, Florida. Tampa Bay entered their eighth indoor season looking for redemption, after the 1980–81 indoor team was the first in club history to miss the playoffs. The club had several noteworthy changes occur in the lead-up to the 1981–82 indoor campaign.

Just as the team's 1981 outdoor playoff run was ending the Rowdies announced a partnership with Brazilian giants São Paulo FC. The agreement would allow the Rowdies to sign up to three loan players during São Paulo’s off season, as well as allowing Tampa Bay’s young players to train with the Brazilian club’s reserve squad.

Less than two weeks later on September 16, a press conference was held announcing that the Dallas Tornado were merging with Tampa Bay. The Dallas owners would become minority owners of the Florida club. For their part, the Rowdies gained the number one overall pick in the upcoming amateur draft, and their choice of players from the Dallas roster. Ultimately they added four, and sold the rest to various NASL, ASL, and MISL clubs.

Just prior to the start of the indoor season Mike Connell was named team captain. He had served as acting captain since May, after Jan van der Veen was traded to California during the 1981 outdoor season. Two noteworthy young players made their Rowdie debuts in December at the beginning of the indoor season. Hugo Pérez, a future U.S. Hall of Famer, who had just turned 18 a few weeks earlier, scored five goals in his first two indoor matches. Not to be outdone, a 19-year-old São Paulo loaner, nicknamed Tatu, scored a hattrick to kick off what would become a legendary 21-year indoor career.

For the team as a whole the 18-game regular season got of to a slow 1–3 start. Things began to pick up after Tatu’s arrival on match-day five. The Rowdies made it into the playoffs in large part by winning seven of their last nine matches. They were edged out for the division title by Chicago on the last day of the regular season, in an overtime thriller in front of a then-record indoor crowd of 19,938 at Chicago Stadium.

Tampa Bay ended the regular season with an 11–7 record and placed second in the Central Division, qualifying them for the playoffs. Rookie sensation Tatu led the club with 21 goals, while Zequinha was the team’s points and assists leader with 60 and 22 respectively.

In the playoffs, the Rowdies beat Montreal and Tulsa in the first two rounds to make it to the finals. In the indoor finals, San Diego Sockers beat Tampa Bay in a sweep. After winning that title, the Sockers went on to win 10 out of the next 11 indoor seasons they played in the NASL indoor and MISL leagues.

Shortly after the playoffs the Rowdies learned that they had placed three players on the 1981–82 all-star team first squad, and one more on the second team.

== Club ==
=== Roster ===
No.	Position	Nation	Player
1	GK	USA	Winston DuBose
2	DF	GER	Peter Gruber
3	DF	SCO	John Gorman
4	DF	YUG	Refik Kozić
6	DF	RSA	Mike Connell (capt.)
7	FW	BRA	Zequinha
8	MF	CAN	Wes McLeod
9	FW	BRA	Luís Fernando
11	FW	USA	Njego Pesa
12	MF	USA	# Perry Van der Beck
13	DF	USA	Carl Bennett
14	FW	BRA	Tatu
16	MF	USA	Pedro DeBrito
16	DF	USA	Ray Vigliotti
17	DF	CAN	Terry Moore
18	FW	URU	Washington Olivera
19	MF	RSA	Neill Roberts
20	GK	GER	Jürgen Stars
21	MF	CAN	Paul Roe
23	FW	CAN	Keith Bailey
24	DF	CAN	Peter Roe
25	FW	USA	Hugo Pérez
27	FW	BRA	Jaiminho

# on injured reserve all season

=== Management and technical staff ===
- (United States) George W. Strawbridge, Jr., owner
- (United States) Chas Serednesky, Jr., president
- (Portugal) Francisco Marcos, director of player personal
- (England) Gordon Jago, head coach
- (England) Kevin Keelan, assistant coach
- (United States) Ken Shields, trainer
- (United States) Alfredo Beronda, equipment manager
- (United States) Dr. Andrew Boyer, team physician

=== Honors ===
- NASL Atlantic Conference: 1981–82 Champions
- NASL Indoor: 1981–82 runners-up

==== Individual honors ====
Four Rowdies received individual honors following the 1981–82 NASL indoor season.

- Atlantic Conference All-Star, First Team: Tatu
- Atlantic Conference All-Star, First Team: Mike Connell
- Atlantic Conference All-Star, First Team: Jürgen Stars
- Atlantic Conference All-Star, Second Team: John Gorman

== Preseason friendlies ==
Tampa Bay played one preseason exhibition match on December 2 against the Jacksonville Tea Men, winning, 9–2.

=== Preseason results ===
Date	Opponent	Venue	Result	Attendance	Scorers	"Ref."
December 2, 1981	Jacksonville Tea Men	H	9–2	closed-door	Peter Roe (2), Pérez (2), Roberts, Olivera, Gorman, Gruber, Zequinha	

== Regular season ==
=== Final division standings ===
W = Wins, L = Losses, GB = Games behind 1st place, % = Winning percentage, GF = Goals for, GA = Goals against

Atlantic Conference • Central Division	W	L	GB	%	GF	GA
Chicago Sting	12	6	–	.667	139	117
Tampa Bay Rowdies	11	7	1	.611	121	113
Tulsa Roughnecks	10	8	2	.556	128	103

=== Results ===
Date	Opponent	Venue	Result	Attendance	Scorers	"Ref."
December 5, 1981	Montreal Manic	H	8–5	5,545	Roberts (2), Zequinha(2), Pérez (2), Peter Roe, Pesa	
December 11, 1981	Tulsa Roughnecks	A	6–5	5,531	Perez (3), Zequinha, Pesa	
December 13, 1981	Toronto Blizzard	A	9–3	5,325	Pesa (3)	
December 17, 1981	Tulsa Roughnecks	A	5–4	4,681	Kozić, Peter Roe, Pérez, Zequinha	
December 19, 1981	Jacksonville Tea Men	H	8–6	4,918	Tatu (3), McLeod (2), Peter Roe, Gorman, Zequinha	
December 23, 1981	Chicago Sting	H	10–8	5,081	Zequinha (2), Peter Roe (2), Pesa (2), Roberts, Moore, Tatu, Gorman	
December 26, 1981	Chicago Sting	A	8–6	11,606	Tatu (3), Zequinha (2), Pérez	
January 2, 1982	Tulsa Roughnecks	H	5–4	5,545	Pesa (2), Tatu (2), Gorman	
January 5, 1982	Jacksonville Tea Men	A	4–2	6,526	Tatu (2)	
January 10, 1982	Toronto Blizzard	A	2–4	3,492	McLeod (2), Pesa, Peter Roe	
January 15, 1982	Montreal Manic	A	6–5	6,730	Gorman, Gruber, Zequinha, Pesa, Tatu	
January 20, 1982	Chicago Sting	H	10–9(OT)	5,214	McLeod (3), Tatu (2), Moore, Pesa, Pérez, Gruber, Peter Roe	
January 23, 1982	Tulsa Roughnecks	A	8–9	5,383	Zequinha (3), Roberts, McLeod, Gorman, Tatu, Pesa, Gruber	
January 30, 1982	Toronto Blizzard	H	8–7	5,545	Roberts (2), Zequinha (2), Pesa (2), Tatu, Gorman	
February 3, 1982	Jacksonville Tea Men	H	7–6(OT)	4,625	Tatu (3), McLeod (2), Zequinha, Peter Roe	
February 6, 1982	New York Cosmos	A	3–10	10,199	McLeod (3), Tatu (2), Peter Roe (2), Kozić, Zequinha, Paul Roe	
February 12, 1982	New York Cosmos	H	8–7	6,112	Pérez (3), Zequinha (2), McLeod (2), Kozić	
February 14, 1982	Chicago Sting	A	10–9(OT)	19,938	Paul Roe (3), Roberts (2), Pérez (2), Kozić (2)	

== Playoffs ==
The playoffs are a home and home series. If one team fails to win both games, then a non-sudden-death, 15-minute mini-game is played, with a brief halftime to changes ends of the field. If the mini-game remains tied after full-time, then the match moves to sudden-death overtime periods, each lasting 7:30.

=== Bracket ===
First round Best-of-3
P1	Edmonton Drillers	8	12	–
P4	Seattle Sounders	6	4	–
P2	San Diego Sockers	4	8	–
P3	Vancouver Whitecaps	3	4	–
A1	Chicago Sting	4	7(OT)	1
A4	Tulsa Roughnecks	5	6	3
A2	Montreal Manic	7	3	1
A3	Tampa Bay Rowdies	8(OT)	2	2(3OT)

Conference finals Best-of-3
P1	Edmonton Drillers	2	3	–
P2	San Diego Sockers	8	12	–
A4	Tulsa Roughnecks	4	4	0
A3	Tampa Bay Rowdies	5	3	1

Championship series Best-of-3
P2	San Diego Sockers	9	10	–
A3	Tampa Bay Rowdies	7	5	–

=== Results ===
Date	Opponent	Venue	Result	Attendance	Scorers	"Ref."
February 18, 1982	Montreal Manic	H	8–7(OT)	4,880	Tatu (3), Zequinha (2), Pesa, DeBrito, Kozić	
February 21, 1982	Montreal Manic	A	2–3	15,855	Tatu, own goal	
February 21, 1982	Montreal Manic	A	1–2(3OT)	(Mini-game)	Fernando, Roberts	
February 25, 1982	Tulsa Roughnecks	A	5–4	7,021	McLeod (2), Tatu (2), Peter Roe	
March 1, 1982	Tulsa Roughnecks	H	3–4	5,545	Zequinha, McLeod, Tatu	
March 1, 1982	Tulsa Roughnecks	H	1–0	(Mini-game)	Pesa	
March 3, 1982	San Diego Sockers (Finals)	A	9–7	12,840	Pérez (2), Gruber (2), Peter Roe, Zequinha, McLeod	
March 8, 1982	San Diego Sockers (Finals)	H	5–10	6,325	Tatu (2), McLeod, Zequinha, Roberts	

== Statistics ==
=== Season scoring ===
GP = Games played, G = Goals (worth 2 points), A = Assists (worth 1 point), Pts = Points

Player	GP	G	A	Pts
Zequinha	18	19	22	60
Tatu	14	21	7	49
Wes McLeod	14	15	14	44
Peter Roe	16	10	23	43
Njego Pesa	13	15	8	38
Hugo Pérez	17	13	8	34
John Gorman	18	6	16	28
Neill Roberts	17	8	9	25
Peter Gruber	18	3	12	18
Refik Kozić	15	5	5	15
Mike Connell	16	0	12	12
Paul Roe	7	4	2	10
Terry Moore	13	2	6	10
Carl Bennett	6	0	2	2
Jürgen Stars	11	0	2	2
Washington Olivera	1	0	1	1
Winston DuBose	7	0	0	0
Keith Bailey	7	0	0	0
Pedro DeBrito	2	0	0	0
Ray Vigliotti	1	0	0	0
Jaiminho	1	0	0	0
Luís Fernando	0	0	0	0

=== Season goalkeeping ===
Note: GP = Games played; Min = Minutes played; GA = Goals against; GAA = Goals against average; W = Wins; L = Losses

Player	GP	Min	Svs	GA	GAA	W	L
Jürgen Stars	11	663:45	193	68	6.14	7	4
Winston DuBose	7	420:16	90	45	6.43	4	3

=== Playoff scoring ===
GP = Games played, G = Goals (worth 2 points), A = Assists (worth 1 point), Pts = Points

Player	GP	G	A	Pts
Tatu	5	9	1	19
Wes McLeod	4	5	7	17
Zequinha	5	5	5	15
Refik Kozić	6	2	7	11
Peter Roe	6	2	6	10
Hugo Pérez	4	3	1	7
John Gorman	6	0	5	5
Neill Roberts	6	2	0	4
Peter Gruber	6	2	0	4
Jürgen Stars	5	0	4	4
Mike Connell	6	0	3	3
Paul Roe	6	0	3	3
Pedro DeBrito	3	1	0	2
Luís Fernando	3	1	0	2
Njego Pesa	2	1	0	2
Keith Bailey	2	0	0	0
Terry Moore	2	0	0	0
Winston DuBose	1	0	0	0
own goal	1	1	0	2

=== Playoff goalkeeping ===
Note: GP = Games played; MGP = Mini-games played; Min = Minutes played; GA = Goals against; GAA = Goals against average; W = Wins; L = Losses

Player	GP	MGP	Min	Svs	GA	GAA	W	L
Jürgen Stars	5	2	343:41	117	31	5.41	3	4
Winston DuBose	1	0	60:03	17	7	6.98	1	0
Mike Connell	4	0	3:54	3	0	0.00	0	0

== Player movement ==
=== In ===
No.	Pos.	Player	Transferred from	Fee/notes	Date	Source
7	FW	(Brazil) Zequinha	(United States) Dallas Tornado	Rowdies/Tornado merger	September 16, 1981	
11	FW	(United States) Njego Pesa	(United States) Dallas Tornado	Rowdies/Tornado merger	September 16, 1981	
13	DF	(United States) Carl Bennett	(United States) Dallas Tornado	Rowdies/Tornado merger	September 16, 1981	
2	DF	(Germany) Peter Gruber	(United States) Dallas Tornado	Rowdies/Tornado merger	September 16, 1981	
16	DF	(United States) Ray Vigliotti	(United States) Dallas Tornado	Rowdies/Tornado merger	September 16, 1981	
20	GK	(Germany) Jürgen Stars	(Canada) Calgary Boomers	NASL dispersal draft	October 6, 1981	
14	FW	(Brazil) Tatu	(Brazil) São Paulo	loan in	December 1, 1981	
21	MF	(Canada) Paul Roe	(Canada) Hamilton Steelers	free transfer	December 12, 1981	
16	FW	(United States) Pedro DeBrito	(United States) UConn	NASL entry draft	December 14, 1981	
27	MF	(Brazil) Jaiminho	(Brazil) São Paulo	loan in	January 11, 1982	

=== Out ===
No.	Pos.	Player	Transferred to	Fee/notes	Date	Source
2	DF	(Scotland) Ian Anderson	(United States) Cleveland Force	returned from loan	September 10, 1981	
9	FW	(England) Frank Worthington	(England) Birmingham City	returned from loan	September 10, 1981	
25	FW	(England) David Moss	(England) Luton Town	returned from loan	September 10, 1981	
11	DF	(United States) Dave Taber	none	release	October 21, 1981	
16	MF	(Canada) Billy Sweetzer	none	release	October 21, 1981	
13	GK	(England) Kevin Keelan	(United States) Tampa Bay	release, hired as asst. coach	October 21, 1981	
15	MF	(England) Dave Mehmet	(England) Charlton Athletic	sold contract for $130,000	November 18, 1981	
14	FW	(Republic of Ireland) Tony Kinsella	(England) Ipswich Town	sold contract	November 20, 1981	
21	DF	(England) Manny Andruszewski	none	released	November 20, 1981	
22	GK	(United States) Kevin Clinton	none	released	December 3, 1981	
16	DF	(United States) Ray Vigliotti	(United States) Baltimore Blast	released; signed with Baltimore	December 12, 1982	
27	MF	(Brazil) Jaiminho	(Brazil) São Paulo	returned from loan	February 23, 1982	

== See also ==
- 1981–82 NASL Indoor season
- 1982 in American soccer
- Tampa Bay Rowdies (1975–1993)
