= 1982 Tampa Bay Rowdies season =

Tampa Bay Rowdies
1982 season
- Owner: (United States) George W. Strawbridge, Jr.
- President: (United States) Chas Serednesky, Jr
- Head coach: (England) Gordon Jago (resigned July 8) (England) Kevin Keelan (interim) (United States) Al Miller
- Stadium: Tampa Stadium
- NASL: Division: 3rd Playoffs: Did not qualify
- U.S. Open Cup: Did not enter
- Top goalscorer: (Brazil) Luís Fernando (16 goals)
- Highest home attendance: 40,098 (July 4 v. Jacksonville)
- Lowest home attendance: 7,131 (August 10 v. Montreal)
- Average home league attendance: 22,532
Home colors	Away colors

The 1982 season was the original Tampa Bay Rowdies eighth season of existence, and their eighth season in the North American Soccer League, the then-top division of soccer in the United States and Canada. In the 1982 season, the Rowdies finished third in the Southern Division, failing to qualify for the playoffs for the first time in franchise history. Brazilian striker, Luís Fernando lead the club in scoring, with 16 goals in the regular season and 25 across all competitions.

== Club ==
=== Roster ===
No.	Position	Nation	Player
0	GK	CAN	Jack Brand
1	GK	GER	Jürgen Stars
2	DF	GER	Peter Gruber
3	DF	SCO	John Gorman
4	DF	YUG	Refik Kozić
5	DF	GER	Peter Nogly
6	DF	RSA	Mike Connell (capt.)
7	FW	BRA	Zequinha
8	MF	CAN	Wes McLeod
9	FW	BRA	Luís Fernando
10	FW	BRA	Tatu
11	MF	BRA	Marcelino Oliveira
12	MF	USA	Perry Van der Beck
13	DF	USA	Carl Bennett
14	FW	USA	Njego Pesa
15	MF	CAN	Paul Roe
16	MF	USA	Pedro DeBrito
17	DF	USA	Don Droege
17	DF	CAN	Terry Moore
19	FW	USA	Hugo Pérez
20	GK	CAN	Tom Boric
21	DF	CAN	Bruce Bates
22	MF	ARG	Carlos Babington
22	GK	USA	Kevin Clinton
24	DF	CAN	Peter Roe

=== Management and technical staff ===
Gordon Jago began the season as head coach but stepped down the day after a 2–1 loss to the Chicago Sting on July 7. Although Al Miller was immediately named as Jago's successor, assistant coach Kevin Keelan served as the interim head coach for one match at San Diego on July 10. Miller joined the team the following day. Keelan also filled in as coach on July 31, during the Sunshine International Series, while Miller attended his daughter's wedding in Dallas. Other members of the staff included the team's trainer, Ken Shields and equipment manager, Alfredo Beronda.

- (United States) George W. Strawbridge, Jr., owner
- (United States) Ted Moore, general manager
- (Portugal) Francisco Marcos, director of player personal
- (England) Gordon Jago, head coach (resigned July 7)
- (England) Kevin Keelan, head coach (interim)
- (United States) Al Miller, head coach (began July 11)
- (United States) Ken Shields, trainer
- (United States) Alfredo Beronda, equipment manager

=== Honors ===
Three Rowdies received individual honors following the 1982 NASL season.

- NASL Rookie of the Year: Pedro DeBrito
- NASL All-Star, First Team: Peter Nogly
- NASL All-Star, Honorable Mention: Mike Connell

== Competitions ==
=== Preseason friendlies ===
Tampa Bay finished their preseason exhibition schedule undefeated with three victories over other NASL teams, one victory over an NCAA Division I squad, one victory over an NCAA Division II squad, and a draw versus the Honduras National Team as that squad prepared for the upcoming 1982 FIFA World Cup.

==== Preseason results ====
Date	Opponent	Venue	Result	Attendance	Scorers
March 17, 1982	Toronto Blizzard	Tangerine Bowl	1–0	1,936	Luis Fernando
March 19, 1982	Rollins College Tars	Sandspur Bowl	4–0		Luis Fernando (3), Zequinha
March 20, 1982	Montreal Manic	Tangerine Bowl	3–2 (SO)	2,623	own goal, Luis Fernando
March 24, 1982	Jacksonville Tea Men	Tangerine Bowl	3–1	2,020	Luis Fernando (2), Njego Pesa
March 28, 1982	Honduras National Team	Tad Gormley Stadium	1–1	7,000	Zequinha
March 31, 1982	South Florida Bulls	USF Soccer Stadium	3–1		Njego Pesa (2), Peter Roe

==== Other friendlies ====
Date	Opponent	Venue	Result	Attendance	Scorers
April 14, 1982	Univ. Tampa Spartans	Tampa Stadium	4–0	closed-door	Njego Pesa (2), Marcelino Oliveira, Fernando

=== North American Soccer League ===
The Rowdies finished the regular season with 112 points placing them in 3rd place out of four teams in the Southern Division, and 12th out of 14 teams in the league overall. It also marked the first time Tampa Bay failed to qualify for the NASL playoffs in eight seasons. Predictably, as the losses mounted attendance dipped, with only a handful of home games reaching the 20,000 mark. Two of those were rivalry games against Fort Lauderdale and New York. One match was followed by a massive Fourth of July fireworks display, while another preceded a free concert featuring music legends, Chuck Berry and The Drifters. The remaining 20,000+ crowd showed up for the opening night of the season.

==== Regular-season standings ====
NASL Southern Division	W	L	GF	GA	PTS
Fort Lauderdale Strikers	18	14	64	74	163
Tulsa Roughnecks	16	16	69	57	151
Tampa Bay Rowdies	12	20	47	77	112
Jacksonville Tea Men	11	21	41	71	105

==== Regular season results ====
Date	Opponent	Venue	Result	Attendance	Scorers
April 3, 1982	Tulsa Roughnecks	H	3–1	27,379	Luis Fernando (2), Zequinha
April 10, 1982	Fort Lauderdale Strikers	H	2–3	25,390	Zequinha, Luis Fernando
April 18, 1982	New York Cosmos	A	2–0	52,436	
April 24, 1982	Toronto Blizzard	H	1–2	17,761	Peter Nogly
April 30, 1982	Jacksonville Tea Men	A	2–0	10,031	
May 2, 1982	Montreal Manic	A	0–2	20,612	Luis Fernando, Mike Connell
May 5, 1982	Fort Lauderdale Strikers	A	2–3	15,205	Marcelino Oliveira, Fernando, Connell
May 7, 1982	Seattle Sounders	H	1–0	15,700	Luis Fernando
May 15, 1982	Portland Timbers	H	1–2 (SO)	18,237	Luis Fernando
May 19, 1982	Jacksonville Tea Men	H	0–2	13,204	
May 22, 1982	Golden Bay Earthquakes	A	6–2	12,797	Luis Fernando, Zequinha
May 29, 1982	Edmonton Drillers	H	4–1	25,387	Tatu (2), Luis Fernando (2)
June 2, 1982	Tulsa Roughnecks	H	2–0	12,109	own goal, Zequinha
June 5, 1982	Tulsa Roughnecks	A	2–0	14,332	
June 9, 1982	Fort Lauderdale Strikers	H	4–2	15,211	Nogly, Tatu, Fernando, Pedro DeBrito
June 12, 1982	New York Cosmos	H	0–2	28,475	
June 16, 1982	Vancouver Whitecaps	A	3–0	18,257	
June 20, 1982	Edmonton Drillers	A	1–3	4,023	Luis Fernando (2), Wes McLeod
June 23, 1982	Golden Bay Earthquakes	H	2–1 (OT)	13,103	Luis Fernando, Peter Nogly
June 26, 1982	Vancouver Whitecaps	H	2–5	14,633	Carlos Babington, Wes McLeod
June 30, 1982	Jacksonville Tea Men	A	4–0	8,488	
July 4, 1982	Jacksonville Tea Men	H	2–0	40,098	Carlos Babington, Tatu
July 7, 1982	Chicago Sting	H	1–2 (SO)	12,863	Carlos Babington
July 10, 1982	San Diego Sockers	A	1–2	6,785	Luis Fernando
July 15, 1982	Tulsa Roughnecks	A	3–0	14,527	
July 17, 1982	Seattle Sounders	A	3–4 (SO)	11,132	Tatu (2), own goal
August 4, 1982	Chicago Sting	A	3–1	9,051	Pedro DeBrito
August 8, 1982	Portland Timbers	A	5–0	6,620	
August 10, 1982	Montreal Manic	H	0–3	7,131	
August 13, 1982	San Diego Sockers	H	3–1	9,436	own goal, Tatu, Luis Fernando
August 18, 1982	Fort Lauderdale Strikers	A	2–1	11,426	Peter Nogly
August 22, 1982	Toronto Blizzard	A	9–2	9,731	Perry Van Der Beck, Don Droege

=== Sunshine International Series ===
The Sunshine International Series was the first international competition to use the NASL’s point system to determine the standings. As such, teams were awarded six points for wins in regulation or overtime, four points for a shoot–out win, and up to three bonus points for each goal scored in regulation. All four teams faced one another. The Rowdies netted four goals and were winless in the series. On the final day of the competition a double header was played at Tampa Stadium with all four teams in action, followed by a concert featuring country-pop crossover singer, Crystal Gayle.

==== Series standings ====
SIS Teams	League	W	L	GF	GA	PTS
São Paulo FC	Série A	3	0	6	2	24
Ipswich Town F.C.	First Div.	2	1	4	2	15
Fort Lauderdale Strikers	NASL	1	2	4	4	10
Tampa Bay Rowdies	NASL	0	3	4	9	4

==== Series results ====
Date	Opponent	Venue	Result	Attendance	Scorers
July 24, 1982	Ipswich Town F.C.	H	1–3	10,693	Luis Fernando
July 28, 1982	São Paulo FC	H	2–3	8,353	Luis Fernando, Refik Kozić
July 31, 1982	Fort Lauderdale Strikers	H	1–3	21,220	Pedro DeBrito

== See also ==
- 1982 North American Soccer League season
- 1982 in American soccer
- Tampa Bay Rowdies (1975–1993)
