= Keith Bailey (soccer) =

Canadian soccer player (1961–2026)

Keith Bailey-
Personal information
- Full name: Keith Brian Bailey
- Date of birth: 7 October 1961
- Place of birth: Toronto, Ontario, Canada
- Date of death: October 2026 (aged 65)
- Positions: Forward; midfielder
- 1978–1979: Bradford City

Senior career*
Years	Team	Apps	(Gls)
1979	Bradford City	3	
1980–1981	Tampa Bay Rowdies	22	(1)
1981–1982	Tampa Bay Rowdies (indoor)	7	(0)
1982	Tampa Bay Rowdies II (reserve team)		
1988–2000	Steeton A.F.C.		
- * Club domestic league appearances and goals

Keith Brian Bailey (7 October 1961 – October 2026) was a Canadian professional soccer player who played as a forward and midfielder.

== Early life ==
Bailey was born in Toronto, Ontario, on 7 October 1961, to English parents. When he was six months old his family returned to England, to a rural part of West Yorkshire.

== Career ==
=== Youth ===
In 1977 Bailey was chosen to play on several local and district select teams. In 1978 at age 16 he signed with Fourth Division club, Bradford City and made several first team appearances with them.

=== NASL career ===
Bailey's aunt and uncle, Ann and Norman Bailey, lived in St. Petersburg, Florida at that time. Through sheer persistence they were able to persuade the North American Soccer League side Tampa Bay Rowdies to grant their nephew a tryout of sorts, while he was visiting them on holiday in May 1980. Impressed by what he saw, Rowdies’ coach Gordon Jago signed Bailey to a three-year contract in early June. Two weeks later he collected an assist in his first ever league match, a start for Tampa Bay at Minnesota Kicks, and scored a goal in his third NASL appearance, coming on as a substitute.

His promising NASL start was abruptly cut short after breaking both his left tibia and fibula during a training ground collision on 7 August. The compound fracture and subsequent rehab forced him to miss the remainder of the 1980 season and playoffs as well as the entire 1980–81 indoor season. He came back to make fourteen appearances in 1981 and another seven in the 1981–82 indoor season. The Rowdies released him in March 1982. He spent the summer of 1982 with Tampa Bay's reserve team, Rowdies II. He later returned to West Yorkshire and played at Steeton A.F.C. before retiring. He spent 12 seasons with Steeton.

== Death ==
Bailey died in October 2026, at the age of 65.

== Honors ==
- North American Soccer League finalist: 1981–82 indoor
