= Paul Roe =

Anglo-Canadian soccer player

Personal information
- Date of birth: 21 November 1959
- Place of birth: Manchester, England
- Date of death: 5 October 2019 (aged 59)
- Place of death: Tampa, Florida
- Position: Forward

Senior career*
Years	Team	Apps	(Gls)
1978	Toronto Metros-Croatia	7	
1979	Toronto Blizzard		
1979–1980	Edmonton Drillers	4	
1980–1981	Edmonton Drillers (indoor)	11	(3)
1981	Hamilton Steelers		
1981–1982	Tampa Bay Rowdies (indoor)	7	(4)
1982	Tampa Bay Rowdies	17	
1983–1984	Tacoma Stars (indoor)	47	(2)
1986–1987	Tampa Bay Rowdies (indoor)		
1988–1990	Tampa Bay Rowdies	31	

International career
1976–1979	Canada U-20	6	
- * Club domestic league appearances and goals

Paul Roe (born 21 November 1959 - 5 October 2019) was a Canadian soccer player who spent five years in the North American Soccer League and one in the Major Indoor Soccer League. He also played in Canada's National Soccer League, the American Indoor Soccer Association, the American Soccer League and the American Professional Soccer League.

Roe represented Canada at the U20 level six times. He played for Toronto Metros-Croatia in 1978 before getting released in June 1979. After his release, Roe was quickly picked up by the Edmonton Drillers and won an NASL indoor title in 1980–81 with them. Roe spent the summer of 1981 with the Hamilton Steelers, who won the NSL title. The following season, 1981–82, he was an indoor runner up with the Tampa Bay Rowdies.

Roe was born in Manchester, England. He was the younger brother of Canadian international soccer player, Peter Roe.

== See also ==
- Peter Roe (soccer)
