= Vigliotti =

Vigliotti is an Italian surname. Notable people with the surname include:

- Jonathan Vigliotti (born 1983), American television journalist
- Ray Vigliotti (born 1960), American soccer player
