= Kevin Keelan =

English footballer (born 1941)

Kevin Keelan MBE
Personal information
- Full name: Kevin Damien Keelan
- Date of birth: 5 January 1941 (age 85)
- Place of birth: Calcutta, Bengal Province, British India
- Position: Goalkeeper

Youth career
- 1956–1958: Kidderminster Harriers
- 1958–1960: Aston Villa

Senior career*
Years	Team	Apps	(Gls)
1960–1961	Aston Villa	5	(0)
1961	Stockport County	3	(0)
1961–1962	Kidderminster Harriers		
1962–1963	Wrexham	68	(0)
1963–1980	Norwich City	571	(0)
1978–1979	→ New England Tea Men (loan)	54	(0)
1980	New England Tea Men	29	(0)
1980–1981	Jacksonville Tea Men (indoor)	13	(0)
1981	Tampa Bay Rowdies	18	(0)
Total		753	(0)

Managerial career
- 1981–1982: Tampa Bay Rowdies (assistant)
- 1982: Tampa Bay Rowdies (interim)
- 1991–: University of Tampa (assistant)
- 1997: Tampa Bay Mutiny (assistant)
- * Club domestic league appearances and goals

Kevin Damien Keelan (born 5 January 1941) is an English former professional footballer who played as a goalkeeper. He spent the majority of his career with Norwich City, though he also played for Aston Villa, Stockport County, Wrexham, New England Tea Men and Tampa Bay Rowdies.

Keelan was appointed a Member of the Order of the British Empire (MBE) in the 1980 Birthday Honours "for services to Norwich City Football Club".

== Playing career ==
Keelan was born in British India, where his father was serving in the Army.

After beginning his career with Kidderminster Harriers, he had spells with Aston Villa, Stockport County, Kidderminster Harriers again and Wrexham before signing for Norwich City in the summer of 1963. Between then and 1980 he would make 673 first-team appearances for the club, a record.

He was twice Norwich's player of the year and played in the teams that lost the League Cup Final to Tottenham Hotspur in 1973 and Aston Villa in 1975.

In both 1978 and 1979, Norwich City sent Keelan on loan to the New England Tea Men of the North American Soccer League for the summer season. He was named in the 1978 NASL All-Star Team.

== Coaching career ==
While playing for the Tampa Bay Rowdies in 1981, Keelan also served as an assistant manager, a position he retained in 1982. In July 1982, he also served as the interim manager when Gordon Jago resigned. In June 1991, the University of Tampa hired Keelan as the goalkeeper coach for the men's soccer team. In February 1997, he replaced Peter Mellor as the goalkeeper coach for the Tampa Bay Mutiny of Major League Soccer.

In an interview for the Norwich City matchday programme on 30 April 2006, Keelan confirmed that he organised goalkeeping schools in Cape Coral and Tampa Florida and coached "pretty much every night". He also stated that for 20 years he worked for a contact lenses manufactory but was planning to retire at the end of 2006 to concentrate on his coaching. He was a staff coach with the Florida Soccer Club.

== Honours ==
Norwich City

- Football League Cup runner-up: 1972–73, 1974–75

== Sources ==
- Mark Davage; John Eastwood; Kevin Platt (2001). Canary Citizens. Jarrold Publishing. ISBN 0-7117-2020-7.
