= Peter Simonini =

American soccer player-coach

Personal information
- Date of birth: January 19, 1957 (age 69)
- Place of birth: Somerville, Massachusetts, U.S.
- Height: 5 ft 11 in (1.80 m)
- Position: Goalkeeper

College career
Years	Team	Apps	(Gls)
1976–1979	Plymouth State Panthers		

Senior career*
Years	Team	Apps	(Gls)
1979–1981	New England Tea Men (indoor)	8	(0)
1980	New England Tea Men	5	(0)
1981–1983	Jacksonville Tea Men		
1984–1985	Dallas Sidekicks (indoor)	2	(0)

Managerial career
- 1987–2007: Bentley Falcons
- 1996–1999: New Hampshire Phantoms (asst.)
- 2004: New England Revolution (asst.)
- 2013–: Duxbury FC (goalkeeping)
- * Club domestic league appearances and goals

Peter Simonini (born January 19, 1957) was an American soccer goalkeeper who was the 1983 American Soccer League MVP. He spent two seasons in the North American Soccer League, one in the American Soccer League, one in the United Soccer League and one in the Major Indoor Soccer League. He later served as the head coach of the Bentley College men's soccer team for twenty years. His son Peter Simonini dances for the Boston Ballet graduate program.

== Player ==
Simonini attended Plymouth State University, playing on the soccer team from 1976 to 1979. He finished his career with a 0.35 goals against average, an NCAA Division III record. In 1990, Plymouth State inducted Simonini into its Hall of Fame. The New England Tea Men of the North American Soccer League drafted Simonini in the first round (third overall) of the 1980 NASL College Draft. He saw time in five games that season. Following the 1980 season, the Tea Men moved to Florida and became the Jacksonville Tea Men. Following the 1982 season, the Tea Men left the NASL and moved to the second division American Soccer League. The Tea Men defeated the Pennsylvania Stoners to win the 1983 championship as Simonini was chosen as the league MVP. The ASL collapsed at the end of the 1983 season and the Tea Men moved to the newly established United Soccer League. The Dallas Sidekicks of Major Indoor Soccer League (MISL) signed Simonini as a free agent on September 14, 1984. He played two games with Dallas before suffering a season ending knee injury in November 1984.

== Coach ==
Simonini has served as the head coach of the NCAA Division II Bentley College soccer team from 1987 to 2007. He finished his tenure with a 188-167-19 record. Simonini has also served as an assistant coach with the New Hampshire Phantoms of the USISL. From 1996 to 1999, and again in 2004, Simonini was the goalkeeper coach for the New England Revolution of Major League Soccer. He later moved on to coaching youth soccer, becoming a goalkeeper coach for Duxbury Football Club (DFC) in Duxbury, Massachusetts. He helped lead them to a 6-1-1 record and the Maple D5 title in 2014. His protégés, Tim Mehrmann and Jacob Hochstein, went on to become the goalkeepers for Duxbury High School.
