= Carl Bennett =

Carl Bennett may refer to:

- Carl Bennett (basketball)
- Carl Bennett (racing driver)
- Carl Bennett (soccer)
- Carl Bennett (statistician)
