= 1980 North American Soccer League season =

Soccer league season

North American Soccer League 1980 season
- Season: 1980
- Teams: 24
- Champions: New York Cosmos (4th title)
- Premiers: New York Cosmos (4th title) most total points Seattle Sounders best Won/Loss record
- Matches: 384
- Goals: 1,371 (3.57 per match)
- Top goalscorer: (Italy) Giorgio Chinaglia (32 goals)
- Highest attendance: 70,312 (Ft. Lauderdale @ NY)
- Lowest attendance: 254 (Memphis at New England)
- Average attendance: 14,440

Statistics of North American Soccer League in season 1980. This was the 13th season of the NASL.

== Overview ==
The league comprised 24 teams; for the only time in NASL history, the lineup of teams was identical to the year before, with no clubs joining or dropping out, franchise shifts or even name changes. The New York Cosmos defeated the Fort Lauderdale Strikers in the finals on September 21 to win the championship. For the third time in league history the team with the most wins (Seattle) did not win the regular season due to the NASL's system of awarding bonus points for goals scored.

== Changes from the previous season ==
The 1980 season saw the regular season expand from 30 games to 32 games. Three North Americans were required to be among the eleven playing in the match for each team, up from two during the previous season.

=== New teams ===
- None

=== Teams folding ===
- None

=== Teams moving ===
- None

=== Name changes ===
- None

== Map of clubs ==
American East Division American Central Division American West Division
National East Division National Central Division National West Division

== Regular season ==
W = Wins, L = Losses, GF = Goals For, GA = Goals Against, PT= point system

6 points for a win, 0 points for a loss, 1 point for each regulation goal scored up to three per game.

-Premiers (most points). -Best record. -Other playoff teams.

=== American Conference ===
Eastern Division	W	L	GF	GA	PT
Tampa Bay Rowdies ^{(2)}	19	13	61	50	168
Fort Lauderdale Strikers ^{(4)}	18	14	61	55	163
New England Tea Men ^{(7)}	18	14	54	56	154
Philadelphia Fury	10	22	42	68	98

Central Division	W	L	GF	GA	PT
Chicago Sting ^{(1)}	21	11	80	50	187
Houston Hurricane ^{(6)}	14	18	56	69	130
Detroit Express	14	18	51	52	129
Memphis Rogues	14	18	49	57	126

Western Division	W	L	GF	GA	PT
Edmonton Drillers ^{(3)}	17	15	58	51	149
California Surf ^{(5)}	15	17	61	67	144
San Diego Sockers ^{(8)}	16	16	53	51	140
San Jose Earthquakes	9	23	45	68	95

=== National Conference ===
Eastern Division	W	L	GF	GA	PT
New York Cosmos ^{(1)}	24	8	87	41	213
Washington Diplomats ^{(5)}	17	15	72	61	159
Toronto Blizzard	14	18	49	65	128
Rochester Lancers	12	20	42	67	109

Central Division	W	L	GF	GA	PT
Dallas Tornado ^{(3)}	18	14	57	58	157
Minnesota Kicks ^{(6)}	16	16	66	56	147
Tulsa Roughnecks ^{(8)}	15	17	56	62	139
Atlanta Chiefs	7	25	34	84	74

Western Division	W	L	GF	GA	PT
Seattle Sounders ^{(2)}	25	7	74	31	207
Los Angeles Aztecs ^{(4)}	20	12	61	52	174
Vancouver Whitecaps ^{(7)}	16	16	52	47	139
Portland Timbers	15	17	50	53	133

== NASL All-Stars ==
First Team	Position	Second Team	Honorable Mention
(England) Phil Parkes, Chicago	G	(Canada) Jack Brand, Seattle	(Netherlands) Jan van Beveren, Fort Lauderdale
(Brazil) Carlos Alberto, New York	D	(Socialist Federal Republic of Yugoslavia) Mihalj Keri, Los Angeles	(England) David Nish, Seattle
(South Africa) Mike Connell, Tampa Bay	D	(Netherlands) Wim Rijsbergen, New York	(Scotland) John Gorman, Tampa Bay
(Netherlands) Rudi Krol, Vancouver	D	(Germany) Peter Nogly, Edmonton	(Haiti) Frantz Mathieu, Chicago
(Scotland) Bruce Rioch, Seattle	D	(England) John Ryan, Seattle	(Iran) Andranik Eskandarian, New York
(Germany) Franz Beckenbauer, New York	M	(Germany) Arno Steffenhagen, Chicago	(England) Ray Hudson, Ft. Lauderdale
(Socialist Federal Republic of Yugoslavia) Vladislav Bogićević, New York	M	(Netherlands) Johan Neeskens, New York	(South Africa) Ace Ntsoelengoe, Minnesota
(Peru) Teófilo Cubillas, Fort Lauderdale	M	(England) Alan Hudson, Seattle	(South Africa) Jomo Sono, Toronto
(Italy) Giorgio Chinaglia, New York	F	(South Africa) Steve Wegerle, Tampa Bay	(Scotland) Tommy Hutchison, Seattle
(Netherlands) Johan Cruyff, Washington	F	(Germany) Karl-Heinz Granitza, Chicago	(England) Alan Green, Washington
(England) Roger Davies, Seattle	F	(Brazil) Luis Fernando, Los Angeles	(Paraguay) Julio César Romero, New York

== Playoffs ==
The top two teams from each division qualified for the playoffs automatically. The last two spots would go to the next best teams in the conference, regardless of division. The top three conference seeds went to the division winners, seeds 4-6 went to the second place teams and the last two seeds were given wild-card berths. The winners of each successive round would be reseeded within the conference by regular season point total, regardless of first-round seeding. The Soccer Bowl remained a single game final.

In 1979 and 1980, if a playoff series was tied at one win apiece, a full 30 minute mini-game was played. If there was no winner after the 30 minutes ended, the teams would then move on to a shoot-out to determine a series winner.

=== Bracket ===
Conference Quarterfinals
AC1	Chicago	1	3	1(0)
AC8	San Diego	2	2	1(3)
AC2	Tampa Bay	1	4	–
AC7	New England	0	0	–
AC3	Edmonton	2	0	1
AC6	Houston	1	1	0
AC4	Fort Lauderdale	2	0	0(3)
AC5	California	1	2	0(2)
NC1	New York	3	8	–
NC8	Tulsa	1	1	–
NC3	Dallas	1	2	–
NC6	Minnesota	0	0	–
NC4	Los Angeles	0	1(5)	2
NC5	Washington	1	1(4)	0
NC2	Seattle	2	3	–
NC7	Vancouver	1	1	–

Conference Semifinals
San Diego	6	0	1(2)
Tampa Bay	3	6	1(0)
Edmonton	0	2(2)	0
Fort Lauderdale	1	2(1)	3
New York	3	0	3
Dallas	2	3	0
Los Angeles	3	0	1(2)
Seattle	0	4	1(0)

Conference Championships
San Diego	1	4	0
Fort Lauderdale	2	2	2
New York	2	3	–
Los Angeles	1	1	–

Soccer Bowl '80
Fort Lauderdale	0
New York	3

=== First round ===
Lower seed		Higher seed	Game 1	Game 2	Mini-game	(lower seed hosts Game 1)
Minnesota Kicks	-	Dallas Tornado	0–1	0–2	x	August 27 • Metropolitan Stadium • 17,461; August 31 • Texas Stadium • 8,674
San Diego Sockers	-	Chicago Sting	2–1	2 - 3	2–1 (SO, 3–0)	August 27 • San Diego Stadium • 12,125; August 30 • Comiskey Park • 12,267
New England Tea Men	-	Tampa Bay Rowdies	0–1	0–4	x	August 27 • Schaefer Stadium • 17,121; August 30 • Tampa Stadium • 26,368
Vancouver Whitecaps	-	Seattle Sounders	1–2 (OT)	1 –3	x	August 27 • Empire Stadium • 27,231; August 30 • Kingdome • 35,254
Washington Diplomats	-	Los Angeles Aztecs	1–0	1–2 (SO, 4–5)	0–2	August 27 • RFK Stadium • 20,231; August 30 • Rose Bowl • 14,163
Houston Hurricane	-	Edmonton Drillers	1–2	1–0	0–1	August 27 • Astrodome • 3,902; August 31 • Commonwealth Stadium • 22,059
California Surf	-	Fort Lauderdale Strikers	1–2	2–0	0–1 (SO, 2–3)	August 28 • Anaheim Stadium • 2,929; August 31 • Lockhart Stadium • 15,282
Tulsa Roughnecks	-	New York Cosmos	1–3	1–8	x	August 28 • Skelly Stadium • 22,890; August 31 • Giants Stadium • 40,285

=== Conference semifinals ===
Lower seed		Higher seed	Game 1	Game 2	Mini-game	(lower seed hosts Game 1)
Los Angeles Aztecs	-	Seattle Sounders	3–0	0–4	2–1 (SO, 2–0)	September 3 • Rose Bowl • 13,466; September 5 • Kingdome • 32,564
Edmonton Drillers	-	Fort Lauderdale Strikers	0–1	3–2 (SO, 2–1)	0 - 3	September 3 • Commonwealth Stadium • 18,029; September 6 • Lockhart Stadium • 17,380
Dallas Tornado	-	New York Cosmos	2–3	3–0	0–3	September 3 • Texas Stadium • 7,459; September 7 • Giants Stadium • 45,153
San Diego Sockers	-	Tampa Bay Rowdies	6–3	0–6	2–1 (SO, 2–0)	September 4 • San Diego Stadium • 20,109; September 7 • Tampa Stadium • 25,852

=== Conference Championships ===
Lower seed		Higher seed	Game 1	Game 2	Mini-game	(lower seed hosts Game 1)
San Diego Sockers	-	Fort Lauderdale Strikers	1–2	4–2	0–2	September 11 • San Diego Stadium • 27,635; September 13 • Lockhart Stadium • 18,420
Los Angeles Aztecs	-	New York Cosmos	1–2	1–3	x	September 10 • Rose Bowl • 25,487; September 13 • Giants Stadium • 42,324

=== Soccer Bowl '80 ===
September 21
12:44 pm EDT

New York Cosmos	3–0	Fort Lauderdale Strikers
Romero; Chinaglia; Chinaglia (87:07)

RFK Stadium, Washington, D.C.
Attendance: 50,768
Referee: Paul Avis (Canada)

1980 NASL Champions: New York Cosmos

== Post season awards ==
- Most Valuable Player: (England) Roger Davies, Seattle
- Coach of the year: (England) Alan Hinton, Seattle
- Rookie of the year: (United States) Jeff Durgan, New York
- North American Player of the Year: (Canada) Jack Brand, Seattle

== Average home attendance ==
Team	Average
New York Cosmos	42,754
Tampa Bay Rowdies	28,345
Vancouver Whitecaps	26,834
Seattle Sounders	24,246
Tulsa Roughnecks	19,787
Washington Diplomats	19,205
Minnesota Kicks	18,279
Toronto Blizzard	15,043
Fort Lauderdale Strikers	14,279
San Jose Earthquakes	13,169
San Diego Sockers	12,753
Los Angeles Aztecs	12,057
Chicago Sting	11,672
Detroit Express	11,198
Edmonton Drillers	10,920
Portland Timbers	10,210
Memphis Rogues	9,864
New England Tea Men	8,748
Rochester Lancers	7,757
California Surf	7,593
Dallas Tornado	6,752
Houston Hurricane	5,818
Atlanta Chiefs	4,884
Philadelphia Fury	4,465
