= Neil Roberts =

Neil Roberts may refer to:

- Neil Roberts (actor) (born 1964), English actor
- Neil Roberts (anarchist) (1960–1982), activist who killed himself when he bombed the New Zealand police database
- Neil Roberts (Australian footballer) (born 1933), Australian rules footballer
- Neil Roberts (basketball) (born 1945), American basketball coach
- Neil Roberts (politician) (born 1955), Australian politician
- Neil Roberts (author) (born 1946), English professor and author
- Neil Roberts (racing driver), NASCAR Cup Series driver; see 1953 Southern 500
- Neil Roberts (Welsh footballer) (born 1978)
- Dr. Neil Roberts, fictional character from American TV series The OC
- Neil C. Roberts (died 2002), U.S. Navy SEAL; first casualty of the Battle of Takur Ghar in Afghanistan

== See also ==
- Neill Roberts (born 1954), soccer player
- Robert Neill (disambiguation)
