= Don Droege =

American soccer player

Personal information
- Full name: Donald T. Droege
- Date of birth: January 21, 1955 (age 71)
- Place of birth: St. Louis, Missouri, United States
- Position: Defender

College career
Years	Team	Apps	(Gls)
1973–1976	St. Louis University		

Senior career*
Years	Team	Apps	(Gls)
1977–1978	Rochester Lancers	45	(1)
1979–1980	Washington Diplomats	49	(2)
1980–1981	Chicago Horizon (indoor)	32	(2)
1981	Atlanta Chiefs	31	(2)
1982	Tulsa Roughnecks	18	(2)
1982	Tampa Bay Rowdies	7	(1)
1982–1983	Chicago Sting (indoor)	10	(0)
1983	Chicago Sting	24	(2)
1983–1985	St. Louis Steamers (indoor)	65	(5)

International career
1977–1979	United States	8	(0)
- * Club domestic league appearances and goals

Don Droege is a former U.S. soccer defender who played seven seasons in the North American Soccer League and three seasons in the Major Indoor Soccer League. He also earned eight caps with the U.S. national team between 1977 and 1979.

== Youth and college ==
Droege grew up in St. Louis, Missouri and attended Christian Brothers College High School where he was the soccer team's 1971 and 1972 defensive MVP. He was also co-captain of the 1972 team. In addition to playing soccer, he was also a baseball letterman his senior year. After graduating from high school, Droege attended St. Louis University, playing on the men's soccer team from 1973 to 1976.

== NASL ==
Droege had originally been drafted by the North American Soccer League (NASL)'s Minnesota Kicks in the second round of the 1976 NASL Draft, but had another year of college eligibility remaining and returned to St. Louis University for the 1976 season. The Rochester Lancers drafted him in the first round in 1977. In December 1978, the Lancers traded Droege to the Washington Diplomats. The Diplomats folded at the end of the 1980 season and Droege was selected by the New England Tea Men in the dispersal draft. However, the Tea Men sold his contract to the Atlanta Chiefs for the 1981 season. However, by that time the NASL's decline was accelerating and the Chiefs folded at the end of the season. Droege moved again, this time to the Tulsa Roughnecks. However, after eighteen games, the Roughnecks traded Droege to the Tampa Bay Rowdies in exchange for Njego Pesa and Terry Moore. He saw time in seven games for the Rowdies in 1982. In 1983, Droege finished his NASL career with the Chicago Sting.

== MISL ==
In 1980, Droege signed with the Chicago Horizon of Major Indoor Soccer League (MISL). The Horizon lasted only one season before folding. Droege did not return to the MISL until he left the NASL in 1983. That fall, Droege returned to Saint Louis to sign with the St. Louis Steamers. He spent two seasons with the Steamers before retiring from playing professionally in 1985.

== National team ==
Droege's first game with the national team came in a 3–1 loss to Guatemala on September 18, 1977. Nine days later, he came on as a substitute in a 3–0 loss to Mexico. From that point on, he played the rest of the U.S. games in 1977. He played in only one of the three U.S. games in 1978, then earned his last cap on May 2, 1979, in a 6–0 loss to France.

Droege was inducted into St. Louis Soccer Hall of Fame in 2005.
