= Keith Bailey =

Keith Bailey may refer to:

- Keith Bailey (cricketer) (born 1964), Irish cricketer
- Keith Bailey (soccer) (1961–2026), Canadian soccer player
- Keith Bailey (drummer), English rock music drummer active from 1960s–80s
