= Robert John O'Neill =

Robert John O'Neill may refer to:

- Robert O'Neill (historian), Australian historian and academic
- Robert John O'Neill (bishop), American prelate of the Episcopal Church

== See also ==
- Robert O'Neill (disambiguation)
