= Arnie Mausser =

American soccer player

Personal information
- Full name: Arnold Mausser
- Date of birth: February 28, 1954 (age 72)
- Place of birth: Queens, New York, United States
- Height: 6 ft 5 in (1.96 m)
- Position: Goalkeeper

Youth career
- Blau-Weiss Gottschee; Brooklyn Technical High School

Senior career*
Years	Team	Apps	(Gls)
1974	Rhode Island Oceaneers		
1975	Hartford Bicentennials	22	(0)
1976	Tampa Bay Rowdies	24	(0)
1976–77	Tampa Bay Rowdies (indoor)	5	(0)
1977	Vancouver Whitecaps	26	(0)
1978	Colorado Caribous	28	(0)
1979–1980	Fort Lauderdale Strikers	36	(0)
1980	New England Tea Men	2	(0)
1980–1982	Jacksonville Tea Men (indoor)	20	(0)
1981–1982	Jacksonville Tea Men	50	(0)
1983	Tampa Bay Rowdies (indoor)	1	(0)
1983	Team America	12	(0)
1983–1984	Tampa Bay Rowdies (indoor)	8	(0)
1984	Tampa Bay Rowdies	23	(0)
1985	Kansas City Comets (indoor)	1	(0)
1985–1986	Buffalo Stallions (indoor)		
1986–1987	Tampa Bay Rowdies (indoor)		
1988–1989	Fort Lauderdale Strikers		
1990	Albany Capitals		
1990–1992	Fort Lauderdale Strikers		

International career
1975–1985	United States	35	(0)
- * Club domestic league appearances and goals

Arnold "Arnie" Mausser (born February 28, 1954) is an American former soccer goalkeeper who played with eight different NASL teams from 1975 to 1984. He is a member of the National Soccer Hall of Fame.

Mausser may be considered one of the finest goalkeepers the United States has ever produced. He is known as the trailblazer for future U.S. goalkeepers such as Kasey Keller, Tim Howard, and Brad Friedel. He was a big man (standing 6' 5") who threw with his right hand, but kicked with his left foot.

== Early life ==
Growing up in Queens, New York, with two younger brothers, Mausser played numerous sports, his favorite being basketball. However, in the eighth grade, he began playing goalkeeper because of his size. Most of his early experience he got playing for Blau-Weiss Gottschee in Ridgewood, Queens. He graduated from Brooklyn Technical High School. As Mausser got older, he trained with numerous local teams, eventually catching the eye of the coach of the Rhode Island Oceaneers of the American Soccer League (ASL). He signed with the team in 1974 and played a single season before moving to the NASL.

== Club career ==
In 1975, Mausser joined the Hartford Bicentennials of the North American Soccer League (NASL). He remained with the team for only a single season before moving to the Tampa Bay Rowdies before the start of the 1976 indoor season. He led the Rowdies to the 1976 indoor title, winning all of his starts. Outdoors in 1976, his excellent play with the Rowdies (six shutouts and 28 goals scored against him in 24 games) led to his selection as a first team NASL All Star and the North American player of the year. Despite his success with the Rowdies, the Tampa Bay coach Eddie Firmani preferred English goalkeeper Paul Hammond who had spent the 1975 season with the Rowdies. As a result, Firmani traded Mausser in 1977 to the Vancouver Whitecaps after the Rowdies signed Hammond.

Although this move was not the result of Mausser's actions, a pattern had been set which continued throughout his career and earned Mausser a reputation as a mercenary playing for whoever offered the best pay. From Vancouver, he moved to the Colorado Caribous, again after only a single season. After only one season in Colorado, he moved to the Fort Lauderdale Strikers, then was traded to the New England Teamen during the 1980 season. At the end of the season, the Teamen moved to Jacksonville, Florida, where Mausser spent the next two seasons as part of the Jacksonville Tea Men.

In the winter of 1983, he briefly returned to the Rowdies for the indoor Grand Prix, making one appearance. From there Mausser joined Team America, the short-lived USSF attempt to form the United States men's national soccer team into a quasi-professional team. In 1984, he played the NASL's last outdoor season back with the Rowdies. When the NASL folded, he briefly played with the Kansas City Comets of the Major Indoor Soccer League (MISL). He also played a season with the Buffalo Stallions of the MISL.

Mauser moved to the Fort Lauderdale Strikers, of the American Soccer League in 1988, then to the Albany Capitals of the American Professional Soccer League for the 1990 season. He ended his career back with the Strikers for another two seasons before retiring in 1992.

== National team ==
Mausser's strong play earned him the starting goalkeeper position for the national team with which he earned 35 caps between 1975 and 1985, appearing in three World Cup qualifying campaigns. He generally played well for the national team, earning 10 shutouts. However, he had a hand in one of the biggest fiascos in U.S. national soccer team history. In 1985, the U.S. was a tie away from going to the second round of the 1985 CONCACAF Championship qualification for the 1986 FIFA World Cup. They had one game left, a home match with Costa Rica in Torrance, California. The U.S. had beaten Costa Rica, 3–0, at the 1984 Summer Olympics and had tied them, 1–1, in Costa Rica five days before the match in Torrance. However, the U.S. team played disjointedly, and in the 35th minute, Mausser weakly punched away a cross he could have caught. The ball flopped to the feet of Evaristo Coronado who easily scored the goal which eliminated the U.S. from World Cup contention and sent Costa Rica to the second round instead. Mausser played one more game for the national team, a 5–0 thrashing by England on June 16, when he saved a penalty by Glenn Hoddle. Mausser continued to be part of the U.S. national soccer team until the 1990 World Cup, though he never played again. There is some debate as to Mausser not being selected to the 1990 World Cup squad which was likely because the team was looking at its youth rather than veteran leadership at the time.

Mausser was inducted into the National Soccer Hall of Fame in 2003.
