= Albert Guðmundsson (footballer, born 1958) =

Icelandic footballer

Personal information
- Full name: Albert Guðmundsson
- Date of birth: 30 April 1958 (age 68)
- Place of birth: Iceland
- Position: Midfielder

Senior career*
Years	Team	Apps	(Gls)
1975–1980	Valur	94	(17)
1981	Edmonton Drillers	13	(0)
1982	Valur	3	(1)
1983	Helsingborg	15	(1)
1984	Mjällby	4	(0)
1985	Hittarp	20	(1)
1986	Ängelholm	?	(?)
1987	Malmö	8	(1)
1987	Landskrona	13	(0)

International career
1975	Iceland U19	5	(1)
1978	Iceland U21	1	(0)
1977–1980	Iceland	7	(1)
- * Club domestic league appearances and goals

Albert Guðmundsson (born 30 April 1958) is an Icelandic former footballer who played as a midfielder. He won seven caps for the Iceland national football team between 1977 and 1980. During his playing career, Albert had spells in Iceland, Canada and Sweden.
