= Lorenz Hilkes =

German footballer

Personal information
- Date of birth: 31 August 1950 (age 76)
- Position: Striker

Senior career*
Years	Team	Apps	(Gls)
1973–1974	Borussia Mönchengladbach	5	(0)
1975	VfB Stuttgart	12	(1)
1976–1977	SpVgg Fürth	58	(21)
1979–1980	Edmonton Drillers	34	(15)
1981–1984	San Diego Sockers	64	(21)
1981–1984	San Diego Sockers (indoor)	77	(41)
- * Club domestic league appearances and goals

Lorenz Hilkes (born 31 August 1950) is a retired German football player. He spent two seasons in the Bundesliga with Borussia Mönchengladbach and VfB Stuttgart. He later played in the North American Soccer League for the Edmonton Drillers, and in both the NASL and Major Indoor Soccer League for the San Diego Sockers.

== Honours ==
- UEFA Cup winner: 1974–75
- Bundesliga champion: 1974–75
- Bundesliga runner-up: 1973–74
- NASL indoor champion: 1981–82, 1983–84
- MISL champion: 1982–83
