= 1980–81 NASL indoor season =

Indoor soccer league season

North American Soccer League 1980–81 indoor season
- Season: 1980–81
- Teams: 19
- Champions: Edmonton Drillers
- Premiers: Chicago Sting
- Matches: 171
- Goals: 1,998 (11.68 per match)
- Top goalscorer: (West Germany) Karl-Heinz Granitza (42 goals)
- Average attendance: 5,146

The 1980–81 season was the North American Soccer League's second indoor soccer season.

== Overview ==
A total of 19 of a possible 21 NASL teams participated. New York and Montreal (who was moving from Philadelphia) were the only hold-outs this indoor season. Just as the season was getting underway, the Jacksonville Tea Men relocated from New England. Teams played an 18-game regular season. The four Canadian teams were realigned into one division and forced to play only one another during the regular season. This was due to early season litigation which restricted NASL teams' travel between the U.S. and Canada. The Edmonton Drillers won the championship in a two-game finals-sweep of the Chicago Sting. This was the Drillers' first, and only, NASL indoor title. Kai Haaskivi of Edmonton won both the regular season and playoff MVP awards.

== Map of clubs ==
Northern Division Eastern Division Central Division Western Division Southern Division

== Regular season ==
W = Wins, L = Losses, GB = Games behind 1st place, % = Winning percentage, GF = Goals for, GA = Goals against

Eastern Division	W	L	GB	%	GF	GA
Atlanta Chiefs	13	5	–	.722	97	75
Tampa Bay Rowdies	9	9	4	.500	126	120
Jacksonville Tea Men	8	10	5	.444	96	102
Fort Lauderdale Strikers	1	17	12	.056	58	125

Central Division	W	L	GB	%	GF	GA
Chicago Sting	13	5	–	.722	146	103
Minnesota Kicks	12	6	1	.667	93	73
Detroit Express	7	11	6	.389	90	106

Southern Division	W	L	GB	%	GF	GA
California Surf	10	8	–	.556	104	118
Tulsa Roughnecks	9	9	1	.500	111	113
Dallas Tornado	7	11	3	.389	110	125
San Diego Sockers	6	12	4	.333	106	121

Northern Division	W	L	GB	%	GF	GA
Vancouver Whitecaps	11	7	–	.611	91	96
Edmonton Drillers	10	8	1	.556	128	109
Calgary Boomers	10	8	1	.556	100	94
Toronto Blizzard	5	13	6	.278	101	121

Western Division	W	L	GB	%	GF	GA
Los Angeles Aztecs	11	7	–	.611	118	99
Portland Timbers	10	8	1	.556	110	93
San Jose Earthquakes	10	8	1	.556	118	115
Seattle Sounders	9	9	2	.500	106	98

== NASL All-Stars ==
All-star selections were made, by region, by the NASL coaches and general managers. Each voter cast ballots for one goalie and five outfield players regardless of position.

All-North team	Position	All-East team	Position	All-West team
(Zimbabwe) Bruce Grobbelaar, Vancouver	G	(Canada) Tino Lettieri, Minnesota	G	(Scotland) Mike Hewitt, San Jose
–	D	(Sweden) Björn Nordqvist, Minnesota	D	(Socialist Federal Republic of Yugoslavia) Mihalj Keri, Los Angeles
(Canada) Gerry Gray, Vancouver	M	–	M	(England) Alan Hudson, Seattle
(Canada) Carl Valentine, Vancouver	F	(South Africa) Steve Wegerle, Tampa Bay	F	(England) Stuart Lee, Portland
(Finland) Kai Haaskivi, Edmonton	F	(Argentina) Pato Margetic, Detroit	F	(Northern Ireland) George Best, San Jose
(Canada) Drew Ferguson, Edmonton	F	(England) Keith Furphy, Atlanta	F	(United States) Juli Veee, San Diego
(Argentina) Juan Carlos Molina, Calgary	F	(Germany) Karl-Heinz Granitza, Chicago	F	(England) Chris Dangerfield, Los Angeles
(Scotland) Bobby Prentice, Toronto	F			

== Playoffs ==
=== Bracket ===
First round Best-of-3
P1	Chicago Sting	6	8(OT)	–
W2	Portland Timbers	2	7	–
E1	Atlanta Chiefs	10	5(OT)	–
C2	Minnesota Kicks	8	4	–
N2	Edmonton Drillers	8	10	–
W1	Los Angeles Aztecs	3	6	–
C1	Vancouver Whitecaps	0	8	4
S1	California Surf	3	5	0

Semifinals; Best-of-3
P1	Chicago Sting	8	5	4
E1	Atlanta Chiefs	3	9	2
N2	Edmonton Drillers	9	6	–
C1	Vancouver Whitecaps	7	4	–

Championship series Best-of-3
P1	Chicago Sting	6	4	–
N2	Edmonton Drillers	9	5	–

=== 1st round ===
If a playoff series is tied after two games, a 15 minute, tie breaker mini-game is played.

Higher seed		Lower seed	Game 1	Game 2	Mini-game	Attendance
Edmonton Drillers	-	Los Angeles Aztecs	8–3	10–6	x	February 16 • L.A. Sports Arena • 1,621; February 19 • Northlands Coliseum • 4,310
Vancouver Whitecaps	-	California Surf	0–3	8–5	4–0	February 18 • Long Beach Arena • 472; February 21 • Pacific Coliseum • 8,496
Atlanta Chiefs	-	Minnesota Kicks	10–8	5–4 (OT)	x	February 16 • Met Center • 6,354; February 20 • The Omni • 6,150
Chicago Sting	-	Portland Timbers	#6–2	8–7 (OT)	x	February 17 • Chicago Stadium • 3,254; February 19 • Chicago Stadium • 6,286

#Scheduling conflicts at the Portland Coliseum forced both games to be played in Chicago.

=== Semi-finals ===
Higher seed		Lower seed	Game 1	Game 2	Mini-game	Attendance
Vancouver Whitecaps	-	Edmonton Drillers	7–9	4–6	x	February 24 • Northlands Coliseum • 3,420; February 28 • Pacific Coliseum • 11,758
Chicago Sting	-	Atlanta Chiefs	8–3	5–9	4–2	February 25 • The Omni • 9,187; February 28 • Chicago Stadium • 12,376

=== Championship finals ===
Higher seed		Lower seed	Game 1	Game 2	Mini-game	Attendance
Chicago Sting	-	Edmonton Drillers	*6–9	4–5	x	March 2 • Edmonton Gardens • 5,089; March 7 • Chicago Stadium • 16,257

*Scheduling conflicts at the Northlands Coliseum forced Game 1 of the Finals to be moved across the street to the Edmonton Gardens.

==== Championship match reports ====
March 2, 1981 Game 1	Edmonton Drillers	9–6	Chicago Sting	Edmonton, Alberta
8:30 P.M. (MST)	Raduka (3:09); Guðmundsson (9:09); Haaskivi; Haaskivi; Haaskivi; Oostrom; Haaskivi; Haaskivi; Haaskivi	Report	Hall; Hall; Simanton; Long (34:18); Fajkus; Simanton	Stadium: Edmonton Gardens; Attendance: 5,089

March 7, 1981 Game 2	Chicago Sting	4–5	Edmonton Drillers	Chicago, Illinois
2:00 P.M. (CST)	Granitza; Steffenhagen; Hall (32:33); Peter (58:54)	Report	Sweeney (31:15); Knight (37:57); Oostrom (40:14); Guðmundsson (46:53); Oostrom (58:49)	Stadium: Chicago Stadium; Attendance: 16,257; Referee: Toros Kibritjan (USA)

1980–81 NASL indoor champions: Edmonton Drillers

== Post season awards ==
- Most Valuable Player: (Finland) Kai Haaskivi, Edmonton
- Finals MVP: (Finland) Kai Haaskivi, Edmonton
