= Robert O'Neal =

Robert O'Neal may refer to:

- Robert O'Neal (American football)
- Robert O'Neal (murderer)

== See also ==
- Robert O'Neill (disambiguation)
