= Peter Mellor =

British-born American soccer player and coach (born 1947)

Personal information
- Full name: Peter Joseph Mellor
- Date of birth: 20 November 1947 (age 78)
- Place of birth: Prestbury, Cheshire, England
- Height: 6 ft 2 in (1.88 m)
- Position: Goalkeeper

Youth career
- 1966–1969: Witton Albion

Senior career*
Years	Team	Apps	(Gls)
1966–1969	Witton Albion	61	(0)
1969–1972	Burnley	69	(0)
1972	→ Chesterfield (loan)	4	(0)
1972–1977	Fulham	190	(0)
1977–1978	Hereford United	32	(0)
1978–1981	Portsmouth	129	(0)
1982	Edmonton Drillers	27	(0)
Total		512	(0)

International career
1966	England Youth	1	
- * Club domestic league appearances and goals

Peter Mellor (born 20 November 1947) is an American former professional footballer whose playing career as a goalkeeper spanned three decades. He played 17 years in the top three tiers of English professional football with Burnley, Fulham, Hereford United and Portsmouth. He is now a coach in the United States.

== Early and personal life ==
Mellor was born in Prestbury, Cheshire, and was raised in Manchester, England. In 1992 he moved to Tampa, Florida. He and his wife Valerie have been married for over four decades, are both US citizens, and have two children. They have lived in Longboat Key, Florida, and Fort Myers, Florida.

== Playing career ==
Mellor's playing career spanned three decades; he played more than 800 league and cup matches over 17 years in the top three tiers of English professional football with Burnley, Fulham, Hereford United, and Portsmouth.

He served as the English U-23 National Team goalkeeper from 1969 to 1970. Mellor won an England Youth cap whilst with his first club Witton Albion in the Cheshire County League. Tall, fair haired and ever-smiling Mellor was soon spotted by Burnley (the Clarets) in 1969, and quickly became their regular keeper, playing for them from 1969 to 1972. The arrival of Alan Stevenson from Chesterfield in January 1972 saw him going in the opposite direction for a loan period at Saltergate.

From there a month later he was sent to Fulham (the Cottagers, who play at Craven Cottage), which paid £25,000 to the Clarets. At Fulham, teammate Alan Mullery noted that he thought Mellor had literally broken every finger on both hands. Mellor was to make over 220 appearances for Fulham in all competitions over six seasons from 1972 to 1977, including perhaps most memorably an appearance in the 1975 FA Cup Final, during which he was unfortunate enough to be deemed at fault for West Ham's two goals, both scored by Alan Taylor.

Mellor moved to Hereford (the Bulls) in September 1977 for the 1977–78 season, but in July of the following year moved to his final league club Portsmouth (Pompey), playing for them until 1982. Mellor quickly became a hugely popular cult figure at Fratton Park, keeping the emerging young Alan Knight out of the team long after he was ready, as Knight made only eight appearances over the course of three years, until the 1981–82 season.

From 1981 to 1983 he played for the Edmonton Drillers in the North American Soccer League. Mellor ended his playing career in Canada, retiring in January 1983.

== Coaching career ==
Mellor later lived and coached in the United States.

He became a staff coach with the United States Soccer Federation from 1992 onward, training the goalies. He designed and wrote the curriculum for the first US Soccer National Goalkeeping License for coaches. Among the players he has identified or coached are Kasey Keller, Marcus Hahnemann, Brad Friedel, Landon Donovan, DaMarcus Beasley, Freddy Adu, Oguchi Onyewu, Michael Bradley, Bobby Convey, Tim Howard, Nick Rimando, and Hope Solo. Mellor also served as national staff coach and goalkeeping instructor for the National Soccer Coaches Association of America for 15 years.

He served as the goalkeeper coach for the Tampa Bay Mutiny of Major League Soccer (MLS), beginning in 1996. That year he also became one of the original coaches for the US U-17 Residency Program in Bradenton, Florida. In 1997, he became the US Soccer Federation's first full-time national goalkeeping coach. He was a goalkeeper coach at the 2000 Summer Olympics with Team USA, which came in fourth. In 2005 through 2007, Mellor served as the assistant coach for the expansion club Real Salt Lake of MLS's Western Conference, managing the goalkeepers and reserve squad.

In 2010, the United Soccer Leagues retained Mellor as National Technical Director, assigned responsibility for managing the technical aspects of USL's player development programs, helping USL teams in the areas of scouting, development, and advancement of players, and setting up a coaches network in the US and Canada to identify top goalkeeping talent for USL teams.

== Beach soccer ==
In the late 1980s Mellor came up with the idea for and founded Major Beach Soccer, soccer on the beach. His inspiration was beach soccer, that he saw in Brazil. As of 2015, the governing body of soccer was considering making it an Olympic sport. The beach soccer field is much smaller than a maximum size soccer field, the goals are smaller, it includes five players on the field on each side at one time, and it has three 10-minute periods. By 2009, there were Major Beach Soccer tournaments being held in Fort Myers Beach, Clearwater Beach, and Daytona Beach. In 2016, Mellor was the Major Beach Soccer President, and 53 teams competed at the Major Beach Soccer National Championship.

== Honors ==
Fulham

- FA Cup runner-up: 1974–75
