= Robert Neale =

Robert Neale may refer to:

- Robert Neale (pilot) (1914–1994), United States Navy dive-bomber pilot
- Robert E. Neale (1929–2025), American minister, psychologist, paperfolder, and magician

== See also ==
- Robert Neal (born 1956), Australian rules footballer
- Robert R. Neall (born 1948), American politician
- Bob Neal (disambiguation)
- Robert Neill (disambiguation)
