= Bob Neal =

Bob Neal may refer to:

- Bob Neal (Atlanta sportscaster) (born 1942), television sportscaster based in Atlanta, Georgia, known for his work covering NBA games for TNT and TBS
- Bob Neal (Cleveland sportscaster) (1916–1983), former radio and television broadcaster for the Cleveland Indians and the Cleveland Browns
- Bob Neal (promoter) (1917–1983), country music promoter
- Robert "Speedy" Neal (born 1962), American football player

== See also ==
- Bob Neill (born 1952), British politician and barrister
- Robert Neale (disambiguation)
- Robert Neill (disambiguation)
