= Robert Neill =

Robert Neill may refer to:

- Robert Neill (American politician) (1838–1907), U.S. Representative from Arkansas
- Robert Neill (Australian footballer) (born 1974), former Australian rules footballer
- Robert Neill (cricketer) (1864–1930), New Zealand cricketer
- Robert Miln Neill (1882–1914), Scottish rugby player
- Robert W. Neill (1853–1928), Scottish footballer (Queen's Park FC and Scotland)
- Bob Neill (born 1952), British politician
- Robert Neill (writer) (1905–1979), British writer of historical fiction
- Bobby Neill (1933–2022), Scottish boxer
- Bobby Neill (footballer) (1875–1913), Scottish footballer

== See also ==
- Robert Neale (disambiguation)
- Bob Neal (disambiguation)
- Robert O'Neill (disambiguation)
- Neil Roberts (disambiguation)
