= 1982 North American Soccer League season =

Soccer league season

North American Soccer League
- Season: 1982
- Teams: 14
- Champions: New York Cosmos (5th title)
- Premiers: New York Cosmos (6th title)
- Matches: 224
- Goals: 809 (3.61 per match)
- Top goalscorer: Ricardo Alonso (21 goals)
- Highest attendance: 52,436; Tampa Bay at New York (April 18)
- Lowest attendance: 2,120; San Jose at Edmonton (August 4)
- Average attendance: 13,155

Statistics of North American Soccer League in season 1982. This was the 15th season of the NASL.

== Overview ==
The league comprised 14 teams. The New York Cosmos won the championship. The NASL no longer used the 35-yard line for offside, but retained its presence for use in tie-breaker shootouts.

== Changes from the previous season ==
=== New teams ===
- None

=== Teams folding ===
- Atlanta Chiefs
- Calgary Boomers
- California Surf
- Dallas Tornado
- Los Angeles Aztecs
- Minnesota Kicks
- Washington Diplomats

Atlanta, Calgary, California, Dallas and Washington folded in September 1981, while Los Angeles and Minnesota were dissolved in November–December 1981.

=== Teams moving ===
- None

=== Name changes ===
- None

== Map of clubs ==
Eastern Division Southern Division Western Division

== Regular season ==
W = Wins, L = Losses, GF = Goals For, GA = Goals Against, PT= point system

6 points for a win in regulation and overtime, 4 point for a penalty shootout win, 0 points for a loss, 1 bonus point for each regulation goal scored, up to three per game.

Premiers (most points). Other playoff teams.

Eastern Division	W	L	GF	GA	PT
New York Cosmos	23	9	73	52	203
Montreal Manic	19	13	60	43	159
Toronto Blizzard	17	15	64	47	151
Chicago Sting	13	19	56	67	129

Southern Division	W	L	GF	GA	PT
Fort Lauderdale Strikers	18	14	64	74	163
Tulsa Roughnecks	16	16	69	57	151
Tampa Bay Rowdies	12	20	47	77	112
Jacksonville Tea Men	11	21	41	71	105

Western Division	W	L	GF	GA	PT
Seattle Sounders	18	14	72	48	166
San Diego Sockers	19	13	71	54	162
Vancouver Whitecaps	20	12	58	48	160
Portland Timbers	14	18	49	44	122
San Jose Earthquakes	13	19	47	62	114
Edmonton Drillers	11	21	38	65	93

== NASL All-Stars ==
First Team	Position	Second Team	Honorable Mention
(Germany) Hubert Birkenmeier, New York	G	(Netherlands) Jan van Beveren, Fort Lauderdale	(Sweden) Jan Möller, Toronto
(Haiti) Frantz Mathieu, Chicago	D	(England) Barry Wallace, Tulsa	(Canada) Bruce Wilson, Toronto
(South Korea) Cho Young-Jeung, Portland	D	(United States) Jeff Durgan, New York	(South Africa) Mike Connell, Tampa Bay
(Germany) Peter Nogly, Tampa Bay	D	(Brazil) Carlos Alberto, New York	(England) John Wile, Vancouver
(Iran) Andranik Eskandarian, New York	D	(England) Ray Evans, Seattle	(Canada) Bob Lenarduzzi, Vancouver
(Socialist Federal Republic of Yugoslavia) Vladislav Bogićević, New York	M	(England) Steve Daley, Seattle	(England) Vince Hilaire, San Jose
(South Africa) Ace Ntsoelengoe, Toronto	M	(Netherlands) Johan Neeskens, New York	(England) Ray Hudson, Fort Lauderdale
(Germany) Arno Steffenhagen, Chicago	M	(Peru) Teófilo Cubillas, Ft. Lauderdale	(United States) Juli Veee, San Diego
(Italy) Giorgio Chinaglia, New York	F	(England) Steve Hunt, New York	(Canada) Branko Šegota, Fort Lauderdale
(England) Peter Ward, Seattle	F	(Germany) Karl-Heinz Granitza, Chicago	(South Africa) David Byrne, Toronto
(Argentina) Ricardo Alonso, Jacksonville	F	(Argentina) Pato Margetic, Chicago	(England) Laurie Abrahams, Tulsa • (England) Godfrey Ingram, San Jose • (England) Carl Valentine, Vancouver

== Playoffs ==
=== Bracket ===
Quarterfinals (Best-of-3)
1	New York Cosmos	5	0	1
8	Tulsa Roughnecks	0	1	0
4	San Diego Sockers	5	0	2
5	Vancouver Whitecaps	1	1	1
3	Fort Lauderdale Strikers	2	1	4
6	Montreal Manic	3	0	1
2	Seattle Sounders	4	1	4
7	Toronto Blizzard	2	2	2

Semifinals (Best-of-3)
1	New York Cosmos	2	2	–
4	San Diego Sockers	1	1	–
3	Fort Lauderdale Strikers	0	4	0
2	Seattle Sounders	2	3	1

Soccer Bowl '82 (Single match)
1	New York Cosmos	1
2	Seattle Sounders	0

=== Quarterfinals ===
Higher seed	Lower seed	Game 1	Game 2	Game 3	Attendance^{†}
New York Cosmos	Tulsa Roughnecks	5–0	0–1	1–0	August 25 • Giants Stadium • 23,917; August 28 • Skelly Stadium • 15,817; September 1 • Giants Stadium • 24,209
Seattle Sounders	Toronto Blizzard	4–2	1–2 (OT)	4–2	August 25 • Kingdome • 13,005; August 27 • Exhibition Stadium • 5,099; September 1 • Kingdome • 17,332
Fort Lauderdale Strikers	Montreal Manic	*2–3 (OT)	1–0 (OT)	4–1	*August 25 • Olympic Stadium • 15,232; August 29 • Lockhart Stadium • 10,696; September 1 • Lockhart Stadium • 11,897
San Diego Sockers	Vancouver Whitecaps	5–1	0–1	2–1	August 25 • Jack Murphy Stadium • 7,267; August 29 • Empire Stadium • 18,253; September 2 • Jack Murphy Stadium • 8,857

† Higher seed hosts Games 1 and 3

* Montreal Manic hosted Game 1 (instead of Game 2) due to stadium conflicts with the Expos baseball club.

=== Semifinals ===
Higher seed	Lower seed	Game 1	Game 2	Game 3	Attendance^{†}
New York Cosmos	San Diego Sockers	2–1	2–1 (OT)	×	September 5 • Giants Stadium • 34,653; September 8 • Jack Murphy Stadium • 13,074
Seattle Sounders	Fort Lauderdale Strikers	2–0	3–4 (OT)	1–0 (OT)	September 4 • Kingdome • 17,338; September 8 • Lockhart Stadium • 15,196; September 10 • Kingdome • 28,986

† Higher seed hosts Games 1 and 3

=== Soccer Bowl '82 ===
September 18

New York Cosmos	1–0	Seattle Sounders
Chinaglia (30:17)

Jack Murphy Stadium, San Diego
Attendance: 22,634
Referee: David Socha (USA)

1982 NASL Champions: New York Cosmos

== Post season awards ==
- Most Valuable Player: (England) Peter Ward, Seattle
- Coach of the year: (Republic of Ireland) Johnny Giles, Vancouver
- Rookie of the year: (United States) Pedro DeBrito, Tampa Bay
- North American Player of the Year: (United States) Mark Peterson, Seattle
- Soccer Bowl MVP: (Italy) Giorgio Chinaglia, New York

== Attendances ==
Club	Games	Total	Average
New York Cosmos	16	459,888	28,743
Montreal Manic	16	341,573	21,348
Tampa Bay Rowdies	16	296,048	18,503
Vancouver Whitecaps	16	292,011	18,251
Tulsa Roughnecks	16	232,862	14,554
Seattle Sounders	16	200,630	12,539
Ft. Lauderdale Strikers	16	197,525	12,345
San Jose Earthquakes	16	176,187	11,012
Chicago Sting	16	150,033	9,377
Portland Timbers	16	140,583	8,786
San Diego Sockers	16	136,504	8,532
Toronto Blizzard	16	129,674	8,105
Jacksonville Tea Men	16	114,564	7,160
Edmonton Drillers	16	78,745	4,922
