= Robert O'Neill =

Robert O'Neill or O'Neil may refer to:

- Robert J. O'Neill (born 1976), US Navy SEAL who claims to have fatally shot Osama bin Laden
- Robert O'Neill (footballer) (1883–1961), Australian rules footballer
- Robert O'Neill (historian) (1936–2023), Australian historian and academic
- Robert E. O'Neill (fl. 2010s), American attorney
- Robert Torrens O'Neill (1845–1910), Irish politician who served in the UK House of Commons
- Robert M. O'Neil (1934–2018), American lawyer and president of the University of Virginia
- Bob O'Neil (1931–2012), American football player
- Bob O'Neill (1905–1978), Australian rules footballer
- Robert John O'Neill (bishop), retired Episcopal bishop of Colorado
- Robert Vincent O'Neil (1930–2022), American screenwriter, film director, and playwright
- Mr. Robert O'Neil, a Teenage Mutant Ninja Turtles character

== See also ==
- Robert Neill (disambiguation)
- Robert O'Neal (disambiguation)
