= Kai Haaskivi =

Finnish footballer and coach (born 1955)

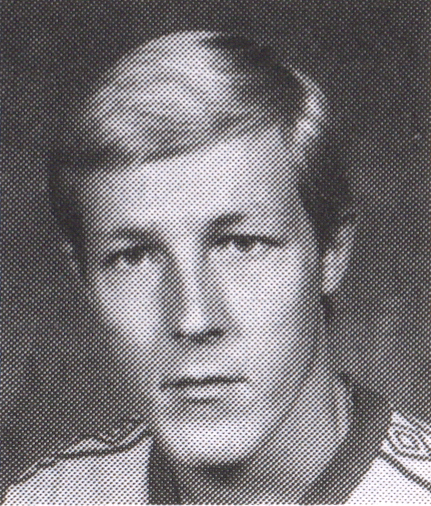
- Haaskivi circa 1984

Personal information
- Full name: Kai Olavi Haaskivi
- Date of birth: 28 December 1955 (age 70)
- Place of birth: Lahti, Finland
- Height: 5 ft 10 in (1.78 m)
- Positions: Forward; midfielder

Senior career*
Years	Team	Apps	(Gls)
1973–1978	GrIFK, HJK Helsinki, Kiffen Helsinki		
1978–1979	Dallas Tornado	20	(1)
1978–1980	Houston Summit (indoor)	49	(90)
1979–1980	Houston Hurricane	55	(15)
1980–1982	Edmonton Drillers (indoor)	36	(60)
1981–1982	Edmonton Drillers	60	(14)
1982–1988	Cleveland Force (indoor)	241	(156)
1988–1989	Baltimore Blast (indoor)	48	(12)
1989–1993	Cleveland Crunch (indoor)	60	(26)

International career^{‡}
1977–1984	Finland	12	(3)

Managerial career
- 1989–1990: Cleveland Crunch
- 1995–1999: IMG Soccer Academy (Director)
- 2001–2004: Pittsburgh Riverhounds
- 2005–2007: Myers University (Men's and Women's teams)
- * Club domestic league appearances and goals as of 12 May 2009 ‡ National team caps and goals as of 12 May 2009

Kai Haaskivi (born 28 December 1955) is a retired Finnish soccer player. He starred in the North American Soccer League, playing outdoor as well as indoor soccer. He also played for the Finland national football team. He now coaches in the United States.

== Playing career ==
=== Professional ===
The 178 cm midfielder began his NASL career in the summer of 1978 with the Dallas Tornado. Haaskivi played in 1979–80 with the Houston Hurricane and 1981–82 with the Edmonton Drillers. He led the league in assists in 1981 with 21 and helped the Drillers win the 1980–81 NASL indoor championship and was named the MVP of the finals. He finished his NASL career with 112 points in 135 games.

Haaskivi began his MISL career in the league's inaugural season of 1978–79 with the Houston Summit. Playing the next season with the Summit as well, he was named an MISL all-star in both seasons. The team lost the championship to the New York Arrows in 1980.

Haaskivi went on to star with the Cleveland Force from 1982–88. While with the Force he led the league in assists in the 1986–87 season. He then played one season for the Baltimore Blast before returning to Cleveland as player-coach of the Cleveland Crunch in 1989. He retired as a player after the 1991–92 season when the MISL, by then named Major Soccer League, folded. The Crunch moved to the National Professional Soccer League. Haaskivi served as color analyst on the team's radio broadcasts.

Haaskivi finished his career in the top ten of several MISL career statistical categories, including fifth in points with 683, tied for ninth in goals with 297, second in assists with 386, and eights in games played with 425. He was an eight-time league all-star selection and was named MVP of the 1987 All-Star Game in Los Angeles.

=== International ===
Haaskivi played 12 full internationals for Finland, notching three goals in the process. In a 1982 friendly in Helsinki against England, celebrating the Finnish F.A.'s 75th anniversary, he scored on a penalty kick as the Finnish team lost 1–4. He also scored against Italy's World Cup Legend, Dino Zoff, in Turin, Italy during a 1978 World Cup qualifier.

== Coaching career ==
During the mid-1990s he served as the first director for IMG's soccer academy in Bradenton. He was assistant coach of the U-17 U.S. National (boys) Teams. From 2001 to 2004 he was head coach and general manager of Pittsburgh Riverhounds, an A-League team. He also coached in Cleveland as the men's and women's head coach for the Myers University Mustangs, and NAIA school. Served as the director of coaching for the Cleveland United and the Braden River soccer club in Florida. Currently works for the US Soccer Federation as a Youth National Team Scout.

== Awards and honors ==
In September 2006, Kai was inducted to the Greater Cleveland Sports Hall of Fame and in March 2013, Haaskivi was one of six men named to the 2013 class of the Indoor Soccer Hall of Fame. The other inductees are Gordon Jago, Preki, Zoltán Tóth, Brian Quinn, and Mike Stankovic.

== Personal ==
Haaskivi is brother-in-law of former star Finnish ice hockey player Matti Hagman and uncle to Calgary Flames Left Wing Niklas Hagman. His father, Olavi Haaskivi, served as the Director of Coaching for the Finnish Football Association for 35 years. His son is the actor Olli Haaskivi. Daughter, Nina Haaskivi.

== Notes and references ==
=== General ===
- Kanerva, Juha (2003). Jalkapallon pikkujättiläinen (in Finnish). WSOY. p. 495. ISBN 951-0-27037-7. OCLC 58365792.
