= Robert O'Neill (footballer) =

Australian rules footballer

Personal information
- Full name: Robert O'Neill
- Born: 3 April 1883; Korong Vale, Victoria
- Died: 25 July 1961 (aged 78); Camperdown, Victoria

Playing career^{1}
Years	Club	Games (Goals)
1902	St Kilda	1 (0)
- ^{1} Playing statistics correct to the end of 1902.

Robert O'Neill (Born 3 April 1883 – 25 July 1961) was an Australian rules footballer who played with St Kilda in the Victorian Football League (VFL).
