= Tony Kinsella =

English footballer (born 1961)

Personal information
- Full name: Anthony Steven Kinsella
- Date of birth: 30 October 1961 (age 65)
- Place of birth: Orsett, England
- Height: 5 ft 8 in (1.73 m)
- Position: Left winger

Team information
- Current team: Leiston (assistant manager)

Senior career*
Years	Team	Apps	(Gls)
1978–1981	Millwall	61	(1)
1981	Tampa Bay Rowdies	15	(0)
1982–1984	Ipswich Town	9	(0)
1984–1986	Millwall	22	(1)
1986–1987	Enfield	?	(?)
1987–1988	Doncaster Rovers	30	(4)
1988–1989	Chelmsford City	3	(0)
Total		140	(6)

International career
	Republic of Ireland U21	2	(0)
- * Club domestic league appearances and goals

Anthony Steven Kinsella (born 30 October 1961) is an English former footballer who played as a left winger in the Football League.

== PLaying career ==
Born in Orsett in Essex, Kinsella started his career in the youth team at Millwall, winning an FA Youth Cup winners medal in 1979. He played for a number of professional football teams in England and the USA.

== Coaching career ==
Kinsella joined the coaching staff at Leiston in 2015. After manager Glen Driver left the club in October 2018, Kinsella took over for a match as caretaker manager, before also leaving.

In 2019, Kinsella became Driver's assistant at Braintree Town.
