= 1981–82 NASL indoor season =

Indoor soccer league season

North American Soccer League 1981–82 indoor season
- Season: 1981–82
- Teams: 13
- Champions: San Diego Sockers
- Premiers: Edmonton Drillers
- Matches: 117
- Goals: 1,392 (11.9 per match)
- Top goalscorer: (United States) Juli Veee (51 goals)
- Highest attendance: 19,398 (Tampa Bay @ Chicago)
- Average attendance: 6,202

The 1981–82 season was the North American Soccer League's third indoor soccer season.

== Overview ==
Thirteen of a possible 14 NASL teams participated. Fort Lauderdale was the only non-participant in the 18-game regular season. The Los Angeles Aztecs and the Minnesota Kicks had been scheduled to participate but were unable to do so, due to mounting financial issues. By early December both teams had folded. Other changes in the indoor structure included the separating of the teams into two conferences, each with two divisions. The Atlantic Conference contained the East and Central Divisions, while the Pacific Conference held the West and Northwest Divisions. During the regular season teams played eighteen matches within their conference only. Four teams from each conference advanced to the playoffs, which included the two division winners, along with the two non-division winners with the best won-loss record. The championship series was broadcast live on ESPN. The San Diego Sockers won the championship with a two-game finals sweep of the Tampa Bay Rowdies. This was the Sockers' first ever NASL title. Juli Veee of San Diego won both the regular season and playoff MVP awards.

== Map of clubs ==
East Division Central Division Northwest Division West Division

== Regular season ==
W = Wins, L = Losses, GB = Games behind 1st place, % = Winning percentage, GF = Goals for, GA = Goals against

=== Atlantic Conference ===
East Division	W	L	GB	%	GF	GA
Montreal Manic	9	9	–	.500	93	97
Toronto Blizzard	8	10	1	.444	86	96
Jacksonville Tea Men	7	11	2	.389	86	106
New York Cosmos	6	12	3	.333	102	123

Central Division	W	L	GB	%	GF	GA
Chicago Sting	12	6	–	.667	139	117
Tampa Bay Rowdies	11	7	1	.611	121	113
Tulsa Roughnecks	10	8	2	.556	128	103

=== Pacific Conference ===
West Division	W	L	GB	%	GF	GA
San Diego Sockers	10	8	–	.556	147	110
Portland Timbers	7	11	3	.389	86	103
San Jose Earthquakes	5	13	5	.278	83	141

Northwest Division	W	L	GB	%	GF	GA
Edmonton Drillers	13	5	–	.722	133	92
Vancouver Whitecaps	10	8	3	.556	93	94
Seattle Sounders	9	9	4	.500	95	97

== NASL All-Stars ==
=== First team ===
Pacific Conference	Position	Atlantic Conference
(Germany) Volkmar Gross, San Diego	G	(Germany) Jürgen Stars, Tampa Bay
(England) Alan Hudson, Seattle	D	(England) Barry Wallace, Tulsa
(Northern Ireland) Martin Donnelly, San Diego	D	(South Africa) Mike Connell, Tampa Bay
(Netherlands) Jan Goossens, Edmonton	F	(Brazil) Tatu, Tampa Bay
(Finland) Kai Haaskivi, Edmonton	F	(Germany) Karl-Heinz Granitza, Chicago
(United States) Juli Veee, San Diego	F	(England) Gordon Hill, Montreal

=== Second team ===
Pacific Conference	Position	Atlantic Conference
(Canada) John Baretta, Edmonton	G	(Socialist Federal Republic of Yugoslavia) Blagoje Tamindžić, Toronto
(United States) Bernie James, Edmonton	D	(United States) Derek Spalding, Chicago
(Germany) Gert Wieczorkowski, San Diego	D	(Scotland) John Gorman, Tampa Bay
(Canada) Dale Mitchell, Portland	F	(Argentina) Pato Margetic, Chicago
(Canada) Carl Valentine, Vancouver	F	(England) Laurie Abrahams, Tulsa
(Germany) Jean Willrich, San Diego	F	(Germany) Ingo Peter, Chicago

== Playoffs ==
=== Bracket ===
First round Best-of-3
P1	Edmonton Drillers	8	12	–
P4	Seattle Sounders	6	4	–
P2	San Diego Sockers	4	8	–
P3	Vancouver Whitecaps	3	4	–
A1	Chicago Sting	4	7 (OT)	1
A4	Tulsa Roughnecks	5	6	3
A2	Montreal Manic	7	3	1
A3	Tampa Bay Rowdies	8 (OT)	2	2 (3OT)

Conference finals Best-of-3
P1	Edmonton Drillers	2	3	–
P2	San Diego Sockers	8	12	–
A4	Tulsa Roughnecks	4	4	0
A3	Tampa Bay Rowdies	5	3	1

Championship series Best-of-3
P2	San Diego Sockers	9	10	–
A3	Tampa Bay Rowdies	7	5	–

=== 1st round ===
If a playoff series is tied after two games, a 15 minute, tie breaker mini-game is played.

Higher seed		Lower seed	Game 1	Game 2	Mini-game	Attendance
Edmonton Drillers	2–0	Seattle Sounders	8–6	12–4	x	February 17 • Kingdome • 4,112; February 20 • Northlands Coliseum • 6,027
San Diego Sockers	2–0	Vancouver Whitecaps	4–3	8–4	x	February 19 • Pacific Coliseum • 5,128; February 21 • San Diego Sports Arena • 9,728
Montreal Manic	1–1	Tampa Bay Rowdies	7–8 (OT)	3–2	1–2 (3OT)	February 18 • Bayfront Center • 5,043; February 21 • Montreal Forum • 15,855
Chicago Sting	1–1	Tulsa Roughnecks	4–5	7–6 (OT)	1–3	February 16 • Expo Square Pavilion • 5,482; February 18 • Chicago Stadium • 16,077

=== Semi-finals ===
Higher seed		Lower seed	Game 1	Game 2	Mini-game	Attendance
Tampa Bay Rowdies	1–1	Tulsa Roughnecks	5–4	3–4	1–0	February 25 • Expo Square Pavilion • 7,021; March 1 • Bayfront Center • 5,545
Edmonton Drillers	0–2	San Diego Sockers	2–8	3–12	x	February 25 • San Diego Sports Arena • 8,435; March 1 • San Diego Sports Arena • 12,840

Although Edmonton was the higher seed, a scheduling conflict forced both games to be played in San Diego.

=== Championship finals ===
*Higher seed		Lower seed	Game 1	Game 2	Mini-game	Attendance
Tampa Bay Rowdies	0–2	San Diego Sockers	7–9	5–10	x	March 3 • San Diego Sports Arena • 12,840; March 8 • Bayfront Center • 6,325

*Championship finals re-seeded based on regular-season won-loss record.

==== Championship match reports ====
March 3, 1982 Game 1	San Diego Sockers	9–7	Tampa Bay Rowdies	San Diego, California
7:00 P.M. (PST)	Veee (2:50); Veee; Coker; Hilkes (15:42); Veee (19:04); Deyna; Coker (42:32); Willrich (46:22); Willrich	Report	Zequinha; Roe (13:03); Pérez; McLeod; Pérez (29:45); Gruber (44:03); Gruber	Stadium: San Diego Sports Arena; Attendance: 12,840; Referee: Manuel Ortiz, Sr.

March 8, 1982 Game 2	Tampa Bay Rowdies	5–10	San Diego Sockers	St. Petersburg, Florida
8:00 P.M. (EST)	Tatu (27:43); McLeod; Tatu (34:08); Zequinha (35:56); Roberts (48:17)	Report	Veee (8:34); Veee (12:13); Deyna; Deyna; Fernandez; Hilkes (36:47); Willrich (43:02); Coker; Willrich; Veee (59:18)	Stadium: Bayfront Center; Attendance: 6,325; Referee: Gordon Arrowsmith (Canada)

1981–82 NASL Indoor Champions: San Diego Sockers

== Postseason awards ==
- Most Valuable Player: (United States) Juli Veee, San Diego
- Playoff MVP: (United States) Juli Veee, San Diego
