= Alan Green (footballer, born 1954) =

English footballer

Personal information
- Full name: Alan Paul Green
- Date of birth: 1 January 1954 (age 72)
- Place of birth: Worcester, England
- Height: 5 ft 5 1/2 in (1.66 m)
- Position: Forward

Youth career
- 1970–1972: Coventry City

Senior career*
Years	Team	Apps	(Gls)
1972–1979	Coventry City	98	(30)
1977	→ Washington Diplomats (loan)	16	(9)
1979–1980	Washington Diplomats	56	(42)
1980–1982	Jacksonville Tea Men (indoor)	21	(22)
1981–1982	Jacksonville Tea Men	48	(27)
1982–1983	Golden Bay Earthquakes (indoor)	18	(7)
1983	→ Team America (loan)	20	(5)
1983–1984	New York Cosmos (indoor)	31	(18)
1983–1984	New York Cosmos	14	(5)
1984–1985	New York Cosmos (MISL)	10	(5)

International career
1972	England Youth	7	(1)
1984	United States	1	(0)
- * Club domestic league appearances and goals

Alan Paul Green (born 1 January 1954) is a former professional footballer. Born in England, he began his career with Coventry City before moving to the United States in 1979. He played seven seasons in the North American Soccer League and earned one cap with the U.S. national team.

== Professional ==
=== In England ===
Green, a native of Worcester, England, began his professional career with Coventry City. He joined the club as a striker in 1970 but did not make his first team debut until 22 April 1972, his only appearance during that season. He peaked with the club during the 1975–76 season when he played 31 games and scored nine goals. After that, his appearances and goals slowly began to taper off.

=== In the United States ===
In 1977, Coventry loaned Green to the Washington Diplomats (Dips) of the North American Soccer League (NASL), whose season ran during the summer months or the English off-season. Green played 16 games, scoring nine goals and assisting on five others. At the end of the 1978-79 English season, Green left Coventry to move permanently to the NASL, rejoining the Diplomats for the next two years. Green became a prolific scorer with the Dips, finding the net 42 times in 56 games, earning NASL All-Star Honorable Mention honours for 1980.

At the end of the 1980 season, the Dips sold Green to the Jacksonville Tea Men; he spent two seasons with the Tea Men. In his first season, Green again gained NASL All-Star Honorable Mention; in 1982, however, he bagged only six goals in 18 games. At the end of the season, the Tea Men traded Green to the San Jose Earthquakes. He played the 1982-1983 NASL indoor season with the Earthquakes, scoring seven goals.

In 1983, U.S. Soccer entered the United States national team, as Team America, into the NASL. The team drew on American citizens playing in the NASL, Major Indoor Soccer League, and American Soccer League. However, the USSF and the NASL quickly discovered that many top American players preferred to remain with their existing clubs. To fill the roster, U.S. Soccer was forced to draw on foreign imports, and it negotiated with the Earthquakes to loan Green to Team America although he was still a British subject. Team America's 1983 season was a disaster, with a league-worst 10–20 record and dwindling attendance figures; the club folded at the season's end. Green then became a free agent and signed with the New York Cosmos as the team prepared for the 1983-84 NASL indoor season. Green received his American citizenship in November 1983 and played with the Cosmos through the indoor season, the subsequent 1984 outdoor season, and finally, the club's 1984-85 indoor season in the Major Indoor Soccer League. In 1985, just as the NASL was collapsing, Green retired as a player.

== U.S. National Team ==
Once Green gained U.S. citizenship, he earned a single cap with the United States national team in a 30 May 1984 scoreless tie with Italy. He started but came off for Perry Van der Beck.
