= Gordon Jago =

English football player and manager (1932–2025)

Gordon Jago MBE
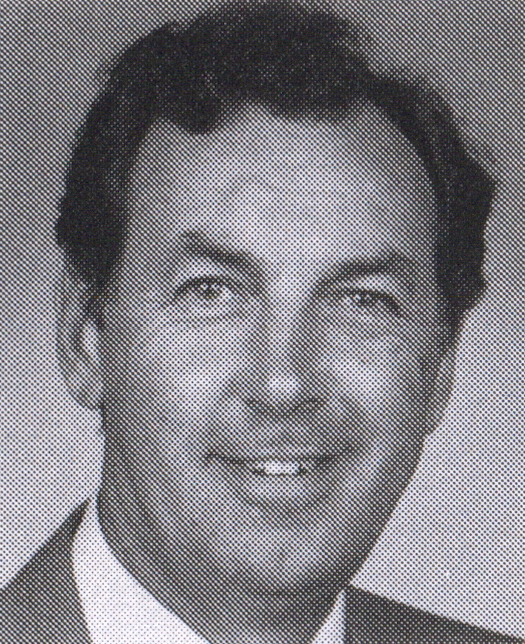
- Jago circa 1984

Personal information
- Full name: Gordon Harold Jago
- Date of birth: 22 October 1932
- Place of birth: Poplar, London, England
- Date of death: 4 July 2025 (aged 92)
- Place of death: Dallas, Texas, U.S.
- Position: Centre-back

Senior career*
| Years | Team | Apps | (Gls) |
| 1949–1954 | Dulwich Hamlet | | |
| 1954–1962 | Charlton Athletic | 137 | (1) |

International career
| 1949 | England U20 | 6 | (0) |

Managerial career
- 1962–1967: Eastbourne United
- 1967–1969: Baltimore Bays
- 1968: United States (assistant manager)
- 1969: United States
- 1971–1974: Queens Park Rangers
- 1974–1977: Millwall
- 1978–1982: Tampa Bay Rowdies
- 1984–1989: Dallas Sidekicks
- 1991–1997: Dallas Sidekicks
- * Club domestic league appearances and goals

Gordon Harold Jago (22 October 1932 – 4 July 2025) was an English football player and manager, and the director of the Dr. Pepper Dallas Cup international youth tournament.

== Playing career ==
Born in Poplar, London, Jago began his professional career as a center back in the Football League at Charlton Athletic, with whom he joined in the 1954–55 season from non-league team Dulwich Hamlet. Prior to Charlton, he played in six full internationals as a member of the England U20 squad. He made a total of 137 league appearances for Charlton scoring one goal, at The Valley and 147 in all competitions.

Jago's final season with the Addicks was 1961–62 before he moved back to non-league football, managing Eastbourne United. He started his coaching career with a spell at Fulham.

== Managerial and coaching career ==
In 1967, Jago was appointed coach of the National Professional Soccer League, and future NASL side, Baltimore Bays. He later served in a dual capacity as the team's general manager as well. In 1968, Jago assisted Phil Woosnam when the latter was appointed head coach of the United States national team in an effort to qualify for the 1970 World Cup in Mexico. A year later he succeeded Woosnam when the latter was appointed Commissioner of the NASL, but ended this role after suffering two defeats in his only games in charge and failing to reach Mexico.

=== Success in England ===
In 1970, Jago joined Queens Park Rangers as a coach and became manager in January 1971. It was under his guidance that the basis of the QPR team which in 1975–76 would come within a point of the League title was assembled. He signed pivotal players such as Stan Bowles, Don Givens, Dave Thomas and Frank McLintock and led the club to promotion to the First Division in 1972–73.

Jago left the club in October 1974 and was later appointed manager of Millwall where he remained until 1977. In 1976 Jago took Millwall from the Third to the Second Division.

=== Tampa Bay Rowdies ===
Jago returned to North America to coach the NASL side, Tampa Bay Rowdies between 1978 and 1982. He saw great success especially early on in Tampa, losing in the outdoor final in both 1978 and 1979 and winning an indoor championship in his second year. Jago would return the Rowdies to the indoor final in the 1981–82 season, but came up short on his second try. He took the Rowdies to the outdoor post-season in four of his five years in Tampa, before resigning in the latter part of a disappointing 1982 outdoor campaign.

=== Dallas Sidekicks ===
After a very brief stint as the general manager at QPR in 1984, Jago later had two separate stints as coach of indoor soccer side Dallas Sidekicks between 1984 and 1997. In between he served as the Sidekicks' team president. In 1996 he also became a ten percent stakeholder in the club. In 1998 Jago stepped down as coach for good. He became President of the World Indoor Soccer League until the merger with the MISL for the 2002–03 season. From 2013 to 2016 Jago served as the colour commentator to Norm Hitzges for the Dallas Sidekicks' televised MASL home games.

== Dr. Pepper Dallas Cup ==
Jago served as executive director of the Dr Pepper Dallas Cup before he stepped down in 2013. Afterward he continued to be an Ambassador and Special Consultant for the tournament. During his tenure the Dallas Cup rose to become one of the preeminent youth soccer tournaments in the world.

== Recognition ==
In 2005 he was made a charter member of the FC Dallas Walk of Fame. In recognition of his lifetime of achievements in advancing the sport, he was made a Member of the Order of the British Empire (MBE) by Queen Elizabeth II in 2006. In December 2010 at the ESPN Wide World of Sports Disney Showcase, Gordon Jago was presented the "Lifelong Achievement Award" at Disney World in Orlando.

In March 2013, Jago was one of six men named to the 2013 class of the Indoor Soccer Hall of Fame. The other inductees, all players, are Preki, Kai Haaskivi, Zoltán Tóth, Brian Quinn, and Mike Stankovic.

A member of the Sidekicks Hall of Fame, he was also awarded a Lifetime Achievement Award by the Dr. Pepper Dallas Cup in recognition of his invaluable, selfless, and far reaching contribution to the beautiful game in March 2016.

== Personal life and death ==
Jago married his wife June Isabella Loveday, a former London police officer, in March 1960. The marriage produced one child. His wife died on 8 December 2014. In March 2017 his autobiography, A Soccer Pioneer: The Autobiography of Gordon Jago, was published by Saint Johann Press.

Jago died in Dallas, Texas on 4 July 2025, aged 92.

== Honours ==
=== Coach ===
Queens Park Rangers

- Second Division promotion to First Division: 1972–73

Millwall

- Third Division promotion to Second Division: 1975–76

Tampa Bay Rowdies

- NASL indoor: 1979–80; runner-up 1979, 1981–82
- Soccer Bowl runner-up: 1978, 1979
- American Conference: 1978, 1979
- Atlantic Conference indoor: 1981–82
- Eastern Division (of Atlantic Conf.): 1978, 1979, 1980

Dallas Sidekicks

- MISL: 1986–87; runner-up 1991–92
- CISL: 1993; runner-up 1994
- MISL Eastern Division: 1986–87
- CISL Eastern Division: 1994

Individual Honors

- MISL Coach of the Year: 1986–87, 1991–92, 1993
- FC Dallas Walk of Fame: 2005
- Member of the Order of the British Empire: 2006
- Indoor Soccer Hall of Fame: 2013
- Dr. Pepper Dallas Cup Lifetime Achievement Award: 2016
