= Steve Long (soccer) =

American soccer player

Personal information
- Date of birth: April 23, 1957 (age 69)
- Place of birth: Babonga, Belgian Congo
- Positions: Forward; midfielder

Youth career
- 1975–1978: Wheaton College

Senior career*
Years	Team	Apps	(Gls)
1979	Pennsylvania Stoners	28	(10)
1979–1981	Chicago Sting	48	(4)
1980–1981	Chicago Sting (indoor)	7	(2)
1981–1984	Memphis Americans (indoor)	127	(39)
1984–1985	Las Vegas Americans (indoor)	13	(0)
- * Club domestic league appearances and goals

Steve Long is an American retired soccer player who played in the American Soccer League, North American Soccer League and Major Indoor Soccer League.

Although born in the Belgian Congo, he was raised in Brazil. He attended Wheaton College where he played on the men's soccer team from 1975 to 1978. He scored 59 goals and added 21 assists for 139 points. This puts him in fourth place on the team's all-time career points list. He was inducted into the school's Athletic Hall of Fame in 1993. In 1979, he played for the Pennsylvania Stoners of the American Soccer League. He then moved to the Chicago Sting of the North American Soccer League. In 1981, he moved, this time to the Memphis Americans of the Major Indoor Soccer League. When the team moved west to Las Vegas in 1984, Long went with it. However, he retired at the end of the 1984–1985 season.
