= New England Tea Men =

Defunct American soccer club

- Full name: New England Tea Men
- Founded: 1978
- Dissolved: 1980; 46 years ago
- Stadium: Schaefer Stadium, Foxborough, Massachusetts; Nickerson Field, Boston, Massachusetts; Providence Civic Center (indoor) Providence, Rhode Island
- Capacity: 60,000; 11,940 (indoor)
- Coach: Noel Cantwell
- League: NASL
colors	Away colors

The New England Tea Men were an American professional soccer team based in the Greater Boston metropolitan area. They played in the North American Soccer League (NASL) from 1978 to 1980. Their home venues for outdoor play were Schaefer Stadium (shared with the NFL's New England Patriots) in Foxborough, Massachusetts, and Nickerson Field near Boston University. They also played one season of indoor soccer in the NASL, using the Providence Civic Center for home games.

The Tea Men were originally owned by Unilever's Lipton subsidiary and given their unusual name as a nod to both the company's product line and the Boston Tea Party.

The Tea Men won their division in 1978 and made a further playoff run in 1980. However, the team struggled for financial solvency in Massachusetts. Right at the start of the 1980–81 indoor season they relocated to Jacksonville, Florida and became the Jacksonville Tea Men.

== History ==
Led in its initial season by former Charlton Athletic F.C. striker Mike Flanagan, the Tea Men won their division to much public acclaim, with Flanagan winning the league MVP award.

Subsequent seasons proved not as successful for two important reasons. First, Flanagan, contracted to Charlton, remained in England (an attempt to secure him via a transfer failed, reportedly over endorsement rights). Second, the team was temporarily evicted from Schaefer Stadium in Foxborough, Massachusetts when the owners of Foxboro Raceway – located next door – claimed that the Tea Men's matches were causing traffic problems on racing dates.

After spending one unhappy season at Nickerson Field on the campus of Boston University, the team reached an accord with Foxboro Raceway to play in Foxboro, but not on racing dates. As a result, the Tea Men had to play many Monday night matches, which caused attendance to dwindle. At one home game during the 1980 season, only 254 fans attended a game, an all time low for the NASL.

After leaving New England, the team moved to Jacksonville, Florida and became the Jacksonville Tea Men.

== Media coverage ==
The Tea Men had extensive radio coverage through their existence. Ten different stations, of which the main one was WLYN, based in Lynn, offered coverage in 1978 before it was scaled back to simply WLYN. WBZ-TV covered a small number of matches on television for the first two seasons before the switch to WLVI in 1980.

== Year-by-year ==
Year	League	W	L	Pts	Reg. season	Playoffs	Avg. attendance
1978	NASL	19	11	165	1st(t), American Conference, Eastern Division	Lost 1st Round (Ft. Lauderdale)	12,064
1979	NASL	12	18	110	4th, American Conference, Eastern Division	did not qualify	6,562
1979–80	NASL Indoor	2	10	—	5th, Eastern Division	did not qualify	3,249
1980	NASL	18	14	154	3rd, American Conference, Eastern Division	Lost 1st Round (Tampa Bay)	8,748

== Honors ==
Division champions (1)
- 1983 Southern Division

NASL Most Valuable Player

- 1978 Mike Flanagan

U.S. Soccer Hall of Fame

- 2003 Arnie Mausser

All-Star first team selections

- 1978 Gerry Daly, Mike Flanagan, Kevin Keelan, Chris Turner

All-Star honorable mentions

- 1978 Dave D'Errico
- 1979 Artur Correia & Gerry Daly

== Staff ==
- (United States) Derek Carroll – President
- (United States) Bill Alex – Play-by-Play Announcer
- Steve Glendye – Color Commentator on Northeast Sports Network

== Coaches ==
- (Republic of Ireland) Noel Cantwell – Head Coach
- (England) Dennis Viollet – Assistant Manager

== See also ==
- Boston Rovers
- Boston Beacons
- Boston Minutemen
- Jacksonville Tea Men
- New England Revolution
