= Luís Fernando Gaúcho =

Brazilian footballer

Personal information
- Full name: Luís Fernando Trieweiler
- Date of birth: 29 March 1955 (age 71)
- Place of birth: Novo Hamburgo, Brazil
- Height: 5 ft 11 in (1.80 m)
- Position: Striker

Youth career
- 1974–1977: Sport Club Internacional

Senior career*
Years	Team	Apps	(Gls)
1977–1979	América (SP)		
1980–1981	Los Angeles Aztecs	35	(31)
1980–1981	Los Angeles Aztecs (indoor)	5	(5)
1981–1983	Tampa Bay Rowdies	56	(28)
1981–1982	Tampa Bay Rowdies (indoor)		
- 15 de Novembro
- Grêmio
- * Club domestic league appearances and goals

Luís Fernando Trieweiler (born 29 March 1955), better known as Luís Fernando Gaúcho, is a Brazilian retired footballer who played as a forward in the 1970s and 80s in Brazil, the United States and Portugal. He was known simply as Luís Fernando while playing in the North American Soccer League.

== Career ==
Luís Fernando Gaúcho was in Novo Hamburgo, Brazil. He was discovered playing in the Brazilian state of Rio Grande do Sul by the director of América Futebol Clube (SP). He began his professional career on the junior team of Sport Club Internacional in 1974, scoring 88 goals, before moving to América (SP) of the First Division in 1977. While at América (SP), he was the top scorer of the Campeonato Paulista League for 1979 with 27 goals.

In 1980 he moved to the Los Angeles Aztecs of the NASL and promptly scored 28 goals in 28 matches that season. That total was second only to Giorgio Chinaglia's 32 markers, and earned Luís Fernando a spot on the 1980 All-NASL 2nd team. In the playoffs, he carried the Aztecs all the way to the final four, before losing to the eventual champion Cosmos in the semi-final. It was L.A.'s best playoff showing since 1977. The following year, a mid-season trade saw him acquired by the struggling Tampa Bay Rowdies. His 9 goals in the final 16 games helped buoy the Rowdies past Seattle into the last playoff spot. His 16 goals in 1982 earned him the Rowdies' team MVP honors. In 91 career NASL games from 1980 to 1983, he scored 59 goles and added 12 assists.

After returning to his homeland he also played for the Brazilian sides 15 de Novembro and Grêmio.
