= Jürgen Stars =

German footballer

Personal information
- Date of birth: 24 June 1948 (age 78)
- Place of birth: Lübeck, West Germany
- Position: Goalkeeper

Youth career
- TSV Schlutup
- 1965–1967: TSV Kücknitz

Senior career*
Years	Team	Apps	(Gls)
1967–1972	1. FC Phönix Lübeck	?	(0)
1971–1977	SV Röchling Völklingen	112	(0)
1977–1980	Hamburger SV	2	(0)
1980–1981	VfR Bürstadt	25	(0)
1981	Calgary Boomers	7	(0)
1981–1982	Hamburger SV	0	(0)
1981–1984	Tampa Bay Rowdies (indoor)	39	(0)
1982–1983	Tampa Bay Rowdies	35	(0)
1984	Tulsa Roughnecks	2	(0)
1984–1986	Altona 93		(0)
1986–1988	VfL Pinneberg		(0)
- * Club domestic league appearances and goals

Jürgen Stars (born 24 June 1948) is a German former professional footballer who played as a goalkeeper in the Bundesliga and the North American Soccer League.

== Career ==
Stars began his professional career in 1967 in his hometown, with 1. FC Phönix Lübeck in the Regionalliga Nord. Also playing for Phönix Lübeck that season was defender Peter Nogly, who would later become Stars' teammate twice more at Hamburg and Tampa Bay.

After four seasons in Lübeck, he joined SV Röchling Völklingen who were initially playing in the Regionalliga Südwest. Stars played there from 1971 to 1977, and under coach Helmuth Johannsen the Völklingen squad twice finished as runner-up 1972 and 1973 in the Bundesliga promotion round. In 1974 his team gained promotion to the 2. Bundesliga South. Between 1974 and 1977, he played in 112 league games at Völklingen.

By signing with Hamburger SV in 1977, Stars finally made it to top-flight European football in the Bundesliga. However, he saw limited action in three seasons, serving mostly as the back-up to Rudi Kargus, who was a fixture in goal at HSV. He only played two league games, but was a member of Hamburg's 1979 Bundesliga champion team. While in HSV he appeared in several DFB-Pokal matches and one Cup Winners' Cup match. He also played in the first leg of the 1977 European Super Cup, a 1–1 draw against Liverpool.

In 1980 Stars moved to newly promoted second division side VfR Bürstadt. There he appeared in 25 matches, helping VfR to 13th place in the table. However, since it was the final year that the 2. Bundesliga used the two-track system, Buerstadt was nevertheless relegated in the Amateur Oberliga Hessen for 1981–82.

Beginning in 1981 Stars also played four years in the NASL, initially for the Calgary Boomers. He then briefly returned to Hamburg before joining Tampa Bay Rowdies during their march to 1981–82 indoor finals. He played three indoor seasons and two outdoor campaigns in Tampa, before moving on to the Tulsa Roughnecks for the 1984 outdoor season. As the starting goalie in Tampa, he won one indoor title in 1983 as well as a runner-up finish in 1981–82.

The NASL folded before the 1985, and Stars returned to West Germany. He finished his club career at Altona 93 and VfL Pinneberg. Over the course of his playing days, Notable teammates of Jürgen Stars were Kevin Keegan, Ivan Buljan, Arno Steffenhagen, Franz Gerber, Hugo Perez, Tatu, and Roy Wegerle. Because of some previous police training, he earned the nickname "Starski" -a reference to the popular television police drama Starsky & Hutch.

== Retirement ==
After his retirement he served as an assistant coach or goalkeeper coach at several German clubs, including HSV in 1996–97 and SV Halstenbek-Rellingen in the Hamburg Oberliga in 2010. He has referred to his time with Tampa Bay in the NASL as "the best time of my life."

== Honors ==
Röchling Völklingen

- Regionalliga Südwest runner-up: 1971–72, 1972–73

Hamburger SV

- Bundesliga: 1978–79
- European Cup runner up: 1979–80
- Bundesliga runner-up: 1979–80
- European Super Cup runner-up: 1977

Tampa Bay Rowdies

- NASL indoor Champion: 1983
- NASL indoor runner-up: 1981–82
- NASL indoor All-star: 1981–82
