= Ray Vigliotti =

American soccer player

Personal information
- Full name: Raymond Vigliotti
- Date of birth: January 13, 1960 (age 66)
- Place of birth: Laurel, Maryland, United States
- Height: 5 ft 9 in (1.75 m)
- Position: Defender

College career
Years	Team	Apps	(Gls)
1978–1979	South Carolina Gamecocks		

Senior career*
Years	Team	Apps	(Gls)
1979–1981	New York Arrows (indoor)	32	(2)
1980	Miami Americans		
1981	Tampa Bay Rowdies (indoor)	1	(0)
1981–1982	Baltimore Blast (indoor)	16	(2)
1982–1983	Wichita Wings (indoor)	14	(1)
1983–1984	New York Arrows (indoor)	18	(2)
- * Club domestic league appearances and goals

Raymond "Ray" Vigliotti is a retired American soccer defender who played professionally in the Major Indoor Soccer League and American Soccer League.

Vigliotti graduated from Laurel High School and played on the U-18 National Youth Team. He attended the University of South Carolina where he played on the men's soccer team in 1978 and 1979. In 1979, the New York Arrows selected Vigliotti in the Major Indoor Soccer League draft and spent two seasons with them. He played the 1980 outdoor season with the Miami Americans of the American Soccer League. Vigliotti was a member of the 1980 US Olympic Soccer team that qualified for the Moscow Olympics, but could not attend due to the US' boycott of Russia's invasion of Afghanistan. In 1981, Vigliotti signed with the Tampa Bay Rowdies for the North American Soccer League's indoor season. He was released on December 24, 1981, after playing a single game. He moved to the Baltimore Blast for the remainder of the 1981–1982 season. On October 2, 1982, Vigliotti signed as a free agent with the Wichita Wings for the 1982–1983 season and finished his career back with the Arrows during the 1983–1984 season.
