= Carl Bennett (soccer) =

American soccer player

Personal information
- Full name: Carl Bennett
- Date of birth: August 9, 1961 (age 65)
- Place of birth: Seattle, Washington, U.S.
- Position: Defender

Senior career*
Years	Team	Apps	(Gls)
1980-1981	Dallas Tornado	11	(0)
1981–82	Tampa Bay Rowdies (indoor)	11	(0)
1982	Tampa Bay Rowdies	1	(0)
1983	Carolina Lightnin'	1	(0)

International career
1979	United States U19	2	(0)
- * Club domestic league appearances and goals

Carl Bennett (born August 9, 1961) is an American retired professional soccer player.

== Career ==
A native of Seattle, Bennett spent two seasons with the Dallas Tornado of the North American Soccer League. When the team was merged with the Tampa Bay Rowdies shortly after the 1981 season, he was one of several Tornado players Tampa Bay chose to retain. An unfortunate string of knee injuries limited his playing time and the Rowdies ultimately released him at the start of the 1983 season. Upon his release the Carolina Lightnin' of the American Soccer League quickly picked Bennett up, but he suffered yet another injury in his first appearance, and by mid-June was released to make roster space for another player. In 1984, Bennett suited up for the Oklahoma City Stampede of the United Soccer League.

As a youth, Bennett made two appearances for the United States U19 squad.

== Honors ==
- North American Soccer League
  - 1981–82 indoor: Finalist
