= Neill Roberts =

South African soccer player

Personal information
- Date of birth: 30 March 1954 (age 72)
- Place of birth: Durban, South Africa
- Positions: Forward; defender

Senior career*
Years	Team	Apps	(Gls)
1972–1974	Durban Celtic		
1975–1976	Maritzburg		
1976–1977	FC Amsterdam	1	(0)
1977–1978	Durban City		
1979	Sacramento Gold	7	(?)
1979	Atlanta Chiefs	19	(14)
1980–1981	Tampa Bay Rowdies	53	(12)
1980–1982	Tampa Bay Rowdies (indoor)		
1982	Edmonton Drillers	13	(5)
1982–1983	Toronto Blizzard	44	(20)
1983–1984	Tampa Bay Rowdies (indoor)	22	(15)
1984	Tampa Bay Rowdies	12	(9)
1984–1986	Chicago Sting (indoor)	68	(41)
1986–1987	Wichita Wings (indoor)	54	(21)
1987–1988	Minnesota Strikers (indoor)	31	(4)
1990	Minnesota Thunder		
- * Club domestic league appearances and goals

Neill Roberts is a retired South Africa soccer forward who spent six seasons in the North American Soccer League and four in the Major Indoor Soccer League.

Roberts spent seven years as a professional in South Africa. In 1979, Roberts signed during the season with the Atlanta Chiefs of the North American Soccer League and promptly scored fourteen goals in nineteen games. During the offseason, the Tampa Bay Rowdies purchased his contract from the Chiefs. However, his goal production dropped with the Rowdies. He played the 1980 and 1981 outdoor seasons with the Rowdies, scoring twelve goals in fifty-three games. Following the 1981-1982 indoor season, the Rowdies sent him to the Edmonton Drillers. Roberts began the 1982 season in Edmonton before being sent to the Toronto Blizzard in June. He was the league's 6th leading scorer in 1982 with 42 points in 12 games. Before the 1984 season, the Rowdies acquired Roberts. He was the 15th leading scorer in 1984 with 23 points in 23 games. He was the league's 24th all-time leading scorer with 156 points in 143 career games. At the end of the 1984 outdoor season, the Rowdies sold Robert's contract to the Chicago Sting as the Sting prepared to enter the Major Indoor Soccer League. The move to the Sting also saw Roberts move to the backline as Chicago coach Willy Roy converted Roberts to a defender. On 1 March 1986, the Sting sold Roberts contract to the Wichita Wings for $30,000. The Wings released him at the end of the season. In November 1987, Roberts signed as a free agent with the Minnesota Strikers. The Strikers released him in 1988. In 1990, he joined the newly established, independent amateur club, the Minnesota Thunder.

Roberts currently coaches the U-11 (Mutiny) boys team of F.C. Tampa youth soccer organization in Tampa, Florida.
