= Terry Moore (soccer) =

Canadian soccer player (born 1958)

Personal information
- Date of birth: June 2, 1958 (age 68)
- Place of birth: Moncton, New Brunswick, Canada
- Position: Defender

Senior career*
Years	Team	Apps	(Gls)
- Larne
- Glentoran
1980–1981	San Diego Sockers	11	(0)
1980–1981	San Diego Sockers (indoor)	12	(2)
1981–1982	Tampa Bay Rowdies	42	(2)
1981–1982	Tampa Bay Rowdies (indoor)	21	(4)
1982–1984	Tulsa Roughnecks	64	(0)
1983–1984	Tulsa Roughnecks (indoor)		
1985–1992	Glentoran		

International career
1983–1986	Canada	11	(0)
- * Club domestic league appearances and goals

Terence "Terry" Moore (born June 2, 1958) is a former Canada national soccer team, NASL, and Irish League player.

Born in Moncton, New Brunswick, Moore lived the first five years of his life in Moncton until his family moved to Northern Ireland. He grew up there and played in the Irish League for Larne and the famous Belfast club Glentoran. Moore made his international debut for Canada against Scotland in 1983, and played in all four games when the Olympic team reached the quarterfinals in 1984. He was a member of the 1986 FIFA World Cup squad in Mexico in 1986, but did not play in the finals.

Moore played 118 regular season games in the NASL and 16 in the playoffs from 1980 to 1984 for three teams. He was a member of the Tulsa Roughnecks team that won the 1983 Soccer Bowl in Vancouver over Toronto Blizzard. With the NASL defunct, Moore returned to Northern Ireland to play and live. At the time of the 1986 World Cup, he was playing for Glentoran. In 2005, he was inducted into the Canadian Soccer Hall of Fame.
