= Pedro DeBrito =

American soccer player (1959–2014)

- DeBrito with Wichita Wings in c. 1988

Personal information
- Full name: Pedro Guilherme DeBrito
- Birth name: Pedro Guilherme Gomes de Brito (Note: In this Portuguese name, the first or maternal family name is Gomes and the second or paternal family name is de Brito.)
- Date of birth: May 25, 1959
- Place of birth: Ribeira Brava, Portuguese Cape Verde
- Date of death: July 5, 2014 (aged 55)
- Place of death: Miami, Florida, U.S.
- Height: 6 ft 1 in (1.85 m)
- Positions: Forward; midfielder; defender

College career
Years	Team	Apps	(Gls)
1978–1981	Connecticut Huskies		

Senior career*
Years	Team	Apps	(Gls)
1982	Tampa Bay Rowdies	29	(2)
1983	Team America	19	(0)
1983–1984	Tampa Bay Rowdies (indoor)	22	(9)
1984	New York Cosmos	23	(2)
1984–1985	New York Cosmos (indoor)	32	(12)
1985–1987	Dallas Sidekicks (indoor)	87	(35)
1987–1990	Wichita Wings (indoor)	108	(14)
1989	Albany Capitals		
1990–1992	Dallas Sidekicks (indoor)	46	(13)
1992–1993	Detroit Rockers (indoor)	23	(13)

International career
1983	United States	1	(0)
- * Club domestic league appearances and goals

Pedro Guilherme DeBrito (May 25, 1959 – July 5, 2014) was a soccer player who played as a midfielder. His career took him through multiple U.S. leagues including the North American Soccer League, Major Indoor Soccer League, American Soccer League and the National Professional Soccer League. Born in Portuguese Cape Verde, he earned one cap with the United States national team in 1983.

== College ==
DeBrito, a native of Cape Verde, moved with his family to Portugal when he was nine. His family then moved to the U.S. when he was fifteen. After high school, he attended the University of Connecticut. He played as a forward on the men's soccer team and finished his four seasons with 43 goals and 59 assists. He holds the school's career assists record and, as of July 2014, is fifth on the career goals list. In 1981, UConn defeated Alabama A&M 2–1 to win the NCAA Men's Soccer Championship. He was a 1980 Honorable Mention and 1981 First Team All American honors. The University of Connecticut inducted DeBrito into the school's Athletic Hall of Fame in 1999. He was inducted into the Connecticut Soccer Hall of Fame in the Class of 2000.

DeBrito was one of 22 college players to be part of the 40-40 club, having both 40 goals and 40 assists in their college career.

== Professional ==
The Tampa Bay Rowdies of the North American Soccer League drafted DeBrito with the first pick in the 1982 NASL College Draft. That year he was the NASL Rookie of the Year as a forward. In 1983, the U.S. Soccer Federation, in coordination with the NASL, entered the U.S. national team, known as Team America, into the NASL as a league franchise. The team drew on U.S. citizens playing in the NASL, Major Indoor Soccer League (MISL) and dies and signed with Team America. When Team America finished the 1983 season with a 10–20 record, the worst in the NASL, USSF withdrew the team from the league and DeBrito returned to the Rowdies. However, he did not play for the Rowdies in 1984 as the team traded him to the New York Cosmos on April 26, 1984, for Refik Kozić and cash. While DeBrito played as a forward with the Rowdies and as a midfielder with Team America, the Cosmos used him as an outside back. DeBrito remained with the Cosmos through the 1984 NASL outdoor season. The league collapsed at the end of the season and the Cosmos jumped to MISL for the 1984–1985 season. However, the Cosmos did not last the season and DeBrito signed with the Dallas Sidekicks (MISL) as a free agent on September 10, 1985. On February 13, 1987, DeBrito injured his right knee putting him out for the remainder of the 1986–1987 season. He began the 1987–1988 season with the Sidekicks but the team attempted to trade DeBrito the Tacoma Stars for Godfrey Ingram. When the two teams failed to complete the trade, the Sidekicks released DeBrito due to salary cap considerations nine games into the 1987–1988 season. DeBrito then signed with Wichita Wings as a free agent. Later that season, he broke his right leg. In 1989, DeBrito played for the Albany Capitals of the outdoor American Soccer League.

DeBrito returned to the Dallas Sidekicks as a free agent in 1990 and remained with the team through 1991. On December 2, 1992, he signed with the Detroit Rockers of the National Professional Soccer League and played with the team until 1994 when he retired from professional soccer. He later spent time in Portugal before returning to the United States and settling in Miami where he continued to play for local recreational soccer teams.

== National team ==
DeBrito earned his only cap in the U.S. national team's only game in 1983, a 2–0 win over Haiti on April 30, 1983.

== Personal life ==
DeBrito's parents were John and Angelina DeBrito. He had five sisters: Vera, Fernanda, Valeriana, Angela, and Maria. His younger brother, John DeBrito, was also a professional soccer player in the 1990s and early 2000s. Pedro was the Boys Varsity Soccer Coach for the Oliver-Wolcott Technical High School in Torrington, CT in 1999.

DeBrito was critically injured in an automobile accident in Miami, Florida, on July 3, 2014, and died as a result of those injuries on July 5, 2014. He was on his way to work as a manager of the Drew Estate Cigar Company when the car he was driving hit a tree in the median.
