= Peter Roe (soccer) =

Canadian international soccer player (born 1955)

Personal information
- Date of birth: September 23, 1955 (age 71)
- Place of birth: Manchester, England
- Positions: Forward; midfielder; defender

Senior career*
Years	Team	Apps	(Gls)
1973–1974	Toronto Metros	10	(3)
1975	Toronto Metros-Croatia	17	(3)
1976	Toronto Italia		
1977–1978	Toronto Metros-Croatia	54	(4)
1978–1979	New York Arrows (indoor)	4	(1)
1979–1980	Toronto Blizzard	29	(4)
1980	Vancouver Whitecaps	10	(1)
1980–1981	Vancouver Whitecaps (indoor)	18	(11)
1981–1984	Tampa Bay Rowdies	54	(0)
1983–1984	Tampa Bay Rowdies (indoor)		
1984–1985	Tacoma Stars (indoor)	41	(8)
1986–1987	Tampa Bay Rowdies (indoor)		
1987	Toronto Blizzard	6	(0)
1988	Tampa Bay Rowdies		

International career
1973–1974	Canada U-20	7	(1)
1974–1983	Canada	9	(1)
- * Club domestic league appearances and goals

Peter Roe (born 23 September 1955 in Manchester, England) is a Canadian international soccer player who spent twelve seasons in the North American Soccer League and two in the Major Indoor Soccer League. He also earned nine caps, scoring one goal, with the Canadian national soccer team between 1974 and 1983.

== Professional ==
Born in England, Roe moved to Bramalea, Ontario with his family when he was eleven. In 1973, Roe signed with the Toronto Metros of the North American Soccer League as an eighteen-year-old. In 1975, the Metros merged with Toronto Croatia to form Toronto Metros-Croatia. In 1976, he played in the National Soccer League with Toronto Italia. In 1979, the team came under new ownership which renamed the team the Toronto Blizzard. Roe continued to play for the club until 1980 through these name changes. He also briefly played for the New York Arrows during the 1978–79 Major Indoor Soccer League season. In 1980, Roe began the season with the Blizzard before moving to the Vancouver Whitecaps. He played the 1980–81 NASL indoor season with Vancouver, then began the 1981 outdoor season there before moving to the Tampa Bay Rowdies. The Rowdies released him 1984 and Roe signed with the Tacoma Stars of the MISL. He returned to the Rowdies in 1986 when it entered the American Indoor Soccer Association. When the Rowdies entered the American Soccer League in 1988, Roe again played for them. He is also the older brother of retired Canadian soccer player Paul Roe.

== National team ==
In 1973, Roe was up to the Canada U-20 men's national soccer team for a February 20, 1973 match with Nicaragua. He would go on to play seven times for the Canadian U-20 team in 1973 and 1974. He scored his only goal at the youth level in a 5–0 victory over the Dominican Republic on August 21, 1974. His last game with the U-20s came in a 2–2 tie with Cuba on August 26, 1974. He earned his first cap with the senior team two months later. On October 9, 1974, he started in a 2–0 loss to East Germany. His last match was a 2–0 loss to Scotland on June 19, 1983. Roe also played nine games for the Canadian Olympic Team including four at the 1975 Pan American games.
