= Jacksonville Tea Men =

Defunct American soccer club

- Full name: Jacksonville Tea Men
- Founded: 1980
- Dissolved: 1984
- Stadium: Gator Bowl Stadium, Jacksonville Coliseum (indoor)
- Capacity: 70,000; 9,200 (indoor)
- Coach: Noel Cantwell (1978-1982) Dennis Viollet (1983-1984)
- League: NASL (1980–1982); American Soccer League (1983); United Soccer League (1984)
colors	Away colors

The Jacksonville Tea Men was a soccer team based in Jacksonville, Florida, United States. Overall, the Tea Men played a total of four years in Jacksonville, first in the major league-level North American Soccer League (NASL) from 1980 to 1982, then in the lower level American Soccer League in 1983 and United Soccer League in 1984.

== History ==
The team originated as the New England Tea Men, who joined the North American Soccer League (NASL) as an expansion team for the 1978 season. Its owner was the Lipton tea company, who gave the team its unusual name as a dual reference to regional history (the Boston Tea Party) and the company's primary product. The club's run in New England got off to a fairly good start. They qualified for the playoffs after finishing tied for first place in their division and averaged about 11,000 fans per game for home dates at Schaefer Stadium in Foxborough, Massachusetts. Their fortunes took a turn in the offseason, however, when the neighboring horse racing track that owned the land on which Schaefer Stadium sat balked at the Tea Men’s plans to host fifteen home games in 1979 that would overlap with racing days (to avoid traffic gridlock and ensure sufficient parking was available in the lots shared by the stadium and track, the stadium’s lease forbade holding events on racing days unless the track owners granted permission). Lipton attempted to fight this decision in court, but when a judge ruled in favor of the race track, the club made last-minute arrangements to play its home matches at Boston University's Nickerson Field instead. Adding to the team’s woes was the fact that their leading scorer and the league’s reigning MVP, Mike Flanagan, failed to return from England due to contract impasses with both his club there and with New England. The relocation and a decline in the team’s performance led to a precipitous drop in ticket sales. They were able to return to Foxborough in 1980, but it was under the same restrictive conditions that forced them to avoid conflicts with the race track by playing games at undesirable times such as Monday evenings. Ticket sales plummeted even further, including a record-setting low of just 254 fans coming to an April home fixture, and Lipton decided to relocate the club to Jacksonville, drawn in by pledges of season ticket sales of 14,000 seats.

By attracting the Tea Men, Jacksonville got its first ever professional soccer team, as well as its first major league-level team in any sport. Lipton elected to retain the Tea Men moniker, leading many commentators and even the players themselves to comment that the name made little sense in a Florida city with no connection to tea. But, the corporation had already lost about one million dollars on this investment, and they did not want to spend more on rebranding or give up the marketing tie-in. So, the name and original clipper ship logo both followed the club south. They made arrangements to host indoor games at Jacksonville Coliseum and outdoor games at the Gator Bowl Stadium.

== North American Soccer League (1980-82) ==
The Tea Men started their run in Jacksonville two games into the indoor 1980–81 season. They completed the indoor schedule with an 8-10 record and missed the playoffs, but they enjoyed something of a turnaround in the 1981 outdoor season. They finished with an 18–14 record and did qualify for the playoffs, where they defeated the Atlanta Chiefs in the first round and won the first game of a best-of-three series against the San Diego Sockers before being eliminated. After drawing a crowd of 17,128 to their home debut, attendance tapered to an average of around 10,000 per game, leaving a lot of empty space in the 70,000 seat Gator Bowl. Actual season ticket sales topped out at about 4,500, nowhere near the promised 14,000. Lipton, which announced that it had lost $1.7 million since the relocation, wanted out. At the urging of mayor Jake Godbold, a group of Jacksonville investors raised funds to lease the team from Lipton and keep it operating the next season.

The 1981-82 indoor season would see the team take a step backwards, finishing 7-11 and out of the playoffs, and they would fare even worse in the 1982 outdoor season. They finished tied for the league's worst record at 11–21. During this dismal campaign, the average attendance was only 7,160 fans per game—well short of the 12,000 per game average that the club would have needed to break even financially. The investment group that had been leasing the Tea Men from Lipton returned the franchise, and Lipton, fed up with all of the red ink, looked to unload the financial albatross for good by selling the team and relocating it again. Charlotte was an early front-runner for the club's new home, and an exhibition game in Charlotte that August against the Carolina Lightnin' of the second-division American Soccer League allowed the company to test both the market and the Carolina roster to see if merging the clubs could work out. Once this option was ruled out, Lipton went on to conduct negotiations with potential buyers in both Milwaukee and Detroit, but neither of these deals was completed, either. The franchise was eventually sold to Jacksonville businessman Ingo Krieg. His plan was to see if The Tea Men's economics could be improved by staying in Jacksonville and moving down to the ASL.

During their time in the NASL the Tea Men's coach was Irishman Noel Cantwell, former manager of Coventry City (1967–1972) and Peterborough United (1972–1977). The assistant coach was Dennis Viollet, former player for Manchester United. Notable players include goalkeeper Arnie Mausser, midfielder Archie Gemmill and strikers Alan Green and Ricardo Alonso.

== American Soccer League and United Soccer League (1983-84) ==
Though it had operated since 1933, the ASL was barely hanging on in the early '80s after a long period of decline. The Tea Men were one of just six teams in the league heading into its 1983 season. Despite the fact that Lipton now had nothing to do with the team at all, new owner Ingo Krieg retained the Tea Men name to try to keep existing "Teas" fans coming out to games. Dennis Viollet stayed in town and assumed head coaching duties for the ASL Tea Men, and four players from the 1982 NASL team would also stay in northern Florida to join him. The reborn Tea Men were the class of the league, finishing the regular season with an 18–7 record (five wins better than the second best team) and winning the championship finals two games to one over the Pennsylvania Stoners.

At the ASL's annual meetings the following January, a dispute arose over rights to an expansion franchise in Fort Lauderdale. Krieg chaired the league's expansion committee, which had granted franchise rights to a group led by retired NASL all-star Ronnie Sharp. However, ASL by-laws allowed dormant owners to retain voting privileges and territorial rights, and the owner of a dormant Miami franchise wanted to run the Fort Lauderdale expansion effort. Krieg was fed up with a power structure that allowed inactive owners to have a say over the direction of the struggling league, and he worked over the weekend with the owner of the Dallas Americans, Bill Spears, to lay the groundwork for a more stable and financially sound second division organization to be called the United Soccer League. Over the course of the spring, the USL attracted three defectors from the ASL (The Tea Men, Dallas Americans and Rochester Flash) and two clubs that were effectively carrying on ASL operations in their towns but had re-organized and re-branded (the Charlotte Gold and Oklahoma City Stampede). Four new organizations would play in the new league as well (including Sharp's Fort Lauderdale Sun). The ASL was left with no active teams and closed down.

The 1984 USL season kicked off in May. The team brought back Ringo Cantillo (who had played with the Tea Men in the NASL days) and about half of the 1983 championship roster, but they were unable to replicate the success of the previous year. The 1984 squad finished last in the league's Southern Division with an 11–13 record and missed the playoffs. They also continued to struggle financially. Despite league-wide measures to control costs such as a tight salary cap and a schedule heavy on regional play to reduce travel expenses, USL owners were still losing money. Last-ditch negotiations took place in February 1985 to salvage some form of professional outdoor soccer by merging the handful of teams from the USL that were not completely insolvent with the last few NASL teams that were interested in carrying on, but these were called off without an agreement on March 5th. Facing a tax lien from the IRS, Krieg was forced to close down the Jacksonville Tea Men once and for all.

=== Year-by-year ===
Year	League	W	L	Pts	Reg. season	Playoffs	Avg Attend
1980–81	NASL Indoor	8	10	—	3rd, Eastern Division	did not qualify	—
1981	NASL	18	14	141	3rd, Southern Division	Won 1st Round (Atlanta); Lost Quarterfinal (San Diego)	9,507
1981–82	NASL Indoor	7	11	—	3rd, American Conference, East Division	did not qualify	—
1982	NASL	11	21	105	4th, Southern Division	did not qualify	7,160

=== All-time results ===
- NASL regular Season: 29–35–0
- NASL Playoffs: 3–2

== Honors ==
League Goal Scoring Champion

- 1982 Ricardo Alonso (21 goals)

League Leading Goaltender

- 1981 Arnie Mausser (GAA: 1.21)

NASL All-Stars

- 1981 Alan Green, Honorable Mention
- 1982 Ricardo Alonso, 1st Team

U.S. Soccer Hall of Fame

- 2003 Arnie Mausser
- Participations in CONCACAF Champions' Cup: 1984

== ASL/USL ==
=== Year-by-year ===
Year	Division	League	Reg. season	Playoffs	U.S. Open Cup
1983	2	ASL	1st, Eastern	Champion	did not enter
1984	N/A	USL	3rd, Southern	did not qualify	did not enter

=== Honors (ASL) ===
ASL MVP

- 1983 – Peter Simonini

ASL ROOKIE OF THE YEAR

- 1983 – Matt English

=== Players (ASL) ===
- (United States) (Costa Rica) Ringo Cantillo (1984)
- (United States) Matt English (1983) 11 Goals
- (United States) Poli Garcia (1983) 9 Goals
- (United States) (Greece) John Lignos (1984)
- (United States) (Greece) Peter Ioanou (1983) 2 Goals
- (United States) (Socialist Federal Republic of Yugoslavia) Robert Maum (1983)
- (United States) (Socialist Federal Republic of Yugoslavia) Steve Ralbovsky (1983)
- (United States) Peter Simonini (1983) 24 Apps 0 Goals
- (Socialist Federal Republic of Yugoslavia) Nino Zec (1983) 6 Goals
- (United States) (Socialist Federal Republic of Yugoslavia) Micky Zivaljevic (1983) 16 Goals
