= Mike Connell (soccer) =

South African footballer

Personal information
- Date of birth: 1 November 1956 (age 70)
- Place of birth: Johannesburg, South Africa
- Position: Defender

Senior career*
| Years | Team | Apps | (Gls) |
| 1972–1975 | Rangers Johannesburg | | |
| 1975–1984 | Tampa Bay Rowdies | 252 | (8) |
| 1979–1984 | Tampa Bay Rowdies (indoor) | 75 | (13) |
| 1985 | Tulsa Roughnecks | ? | (?) |
| 1985 | Tulsa Tornados | ? | (?) |
| 1985 | Tampa Bay Rowdies | 1 | (0) |
| 1988 | Ft. Lauderdale Strikers (ASL) | | |

Managerial career
- 1986: Clearwater Central Catholic High School
- * Club domestic league appearances and goals

Mike Connell (born 1 November 1956 in Mayfair, Johannesburg, South Africa) is a former professional footballer who spent most of his career as a defender. He played professionally in his native South Africa as well as in the North American Soccer League (NASL), mostly with the Tampa Bay Rowdies.

Connell earned the nickname "Iron Mike" by starting in an NASL record 179 consecutive regular season matches and appeared in 252 games overall, which was third in league history. Connell was also a two time first-team NASL all star.

== National team ==
Through the early 1970s, Connell was selected to the all star teams and in 1971 and 1972 was selected to the South African Schoolboy team. At the time South Africa was suspended from FIFA and no international games could be played.

== Professional ==
Alex Forbes, the manager of the professional team brought Mike into the first team squad. His full professional debut was made in 1972 at the age of 16 against Durban City. In 1973 Mike was invited to go on trial with Arsenal in England. He spent 6 months on trial but was not signed. He returned to Rangers. In 1974 Eddie Firmani, the new coach of the Tampa Bay Rowdies in Tampa USA, was scouting for players in South Africa. Rangers was playing Arcadia Shepherds who featured Steve Wegerle. After Mike was substituted his father confronted Alex Forbes on the field. An act Eddie Firmani realised gave him opportunity to get Mike. In 1975 at the age of 18 Mike arrived in Tampa, Florida USA. He remained under contract every season for the Rowdies until the NASL collapsed in 1984. He was forced to miss the entire 1976 outdoor and 1976 indoor seasons while he fulfilled his South African military obligation. His years with the team included one championship, in 1975, and two runners-up, in 1978 and 1979. In NASL indoor he won one championship in 1979–80 and one runner-up in 1981–82. Connell was also part of the 1983 Indoor Grand Prix winning side, though he did not play in the final due to injury. He was a 1979 and 1980 First Team All Star and a 1982 Honourable Mention All Star. He ranks third in career NASL regular season games played with 252. Connell holds the NASL all-time record for consecutive regular season starts with 179. The streak came to an unceremonious end on the last day of the 1984 season, with Connell's somewhat controversial benching by then coach and former teammate, Rodney Marsh, in what was to be the Rowdies final NASL game. In 1985, he spent some time with both the recently independent Tulsa Roughnecks, and also the Tulsa Tornados of the United Soccer League After the USL folded midseason, he returned to the Rowdies, now playing as an independent club for one match. He spent one season, 1988, in the ASL with the Rowdies' arch-rival, Fort Lauderdale Strikers, before fully retiring as a player.

== Coach ==
In the mid-1980s, Connell became the head coach of the Clearwater Central Catholic High School boys' team.

He has a wife, Kim, and a daughter, Ashton, and a son, Michael. They currently reside in Lutz, Florida.

At halftime of a match versus the New York Cosmos on 10 August 2013 the new Tampa Bay Rowdies honoured Connell by retiring his #6 jersey.
