= Edmonton Drillers (1979–1982) =

Canadian soccer team

- Full name: Edmonton Drillers
- Founded: 1979
- Dissolved: 1982; 44 years ago
- Stadium: Commonwealth Stadium (42,500) indoor: Northlands Coliseum (17,490); Edmonton Gardens (5,100)
- Chairman: Joe Petrone
- Head coach: Hans Kraay; Timo Liekoski; Joe Petrone
- League: North American Soccer League
Home colours	Away colours

The Edmonton Drillers were a North American Soccer League team that played both outdoors and indoors from 1979 to 1982, at the peak of the league's success. The team was brought to Edmonton by local entrepreneur and Edmonton Oilers owner Peter Pocklington, after witnessing the strong support for Brian Rice's Edmonton Black Gold team in 1978. Previous to playing in Edmonton, the team was known as the Oakland Stompers, Hartford Bicentennials and Connecticut Bicentennials.

== History ==
Joe Petrone was the Drillers general manager for their entire existence. The Drillers were coached in 1979 and 1980 by Hans Kraay, who brought a number of players with him from the Netherlands. After Kraay, Timo Liekoski took over as coach in 1981, while Patrone would serve as the team's final caretaker coach until the team folded at the end of the 1982 season.

During the outdoor season, the Drillers played their home games at Commonwealth Stadium, but dwindling crowds during the final year saw the team move to much older and smaller Clarke Stadium, which led to even fewer fans attending the games. The Drillers played their two seasons of indoor soccer at Northlands Coliseum and also at Edmonton Gardens. The outdoor team was characterized by a strong defensive style of play, but their indoor style was built upon a run-and-go style of attack. Attendance for the outdoor games ranged greatly from 10,000 in the early stages of the franchise to 4,000 per game in 1982. By comparison, the more successful and profitable indoor games had attendances ranging between 5,000 and 7,000 paying fans per game in 1981 and 1982.

Because the Northlands Coliseum was booked, Game 1 of the 1981 NASL indoor finals was instead played at the slated-for-demolition Edmonton Gardens. On March 2, 1981, the Drillers defeated the Chicago Sting, 9–6, in front of 5,089 fans to lead the series. In Game 2, played five days later, Edmonton came from behind to down the Sting, 5–4, in front of a then-record NASL indoor crowd of 16,257 at Chicago Stadium to sweep the finals and claim the 1981 NASL indoor championship.

=== Factors leading to collapse ===
In 1982, costs were skyrocketing for the team as they were with a number of the other NASL franchises. In Edmonton's case in particular, the following have been speculated as factors connected with the team's collapse: poor support by local media; difficulties stemming from a tricky deal with the owners of the Coliseum and Commonwealth Stadium relating to the attendance, concessions and parking at the indoor games; and as admitted by John Colbert, the Drillers' business manager in 1982, a business strategy that consisted a "top-down construction" for the team (i.e., bringing in expensive international players as opposed to developing cheaper local talent).

== Year-by-year results ==
Year	League	W	L	T	Pts	Reg. season	Playoffs	Average Attendance
1979	NASL	8	22	—	88	3rd, American Western	did not qualify	9,924 (16th of 24 teams)
1979–80	NASL Indoor	did not participate						
1980	NASL	17	15	—	149	1st, American Conference, Western Division	Won 1st Round (Houston); Lost Conference Semifinal (Ft. Lauderdale)	10,920 (15th of 24 teams)
1980–81	NASL Indoor	10	8	—	—	2nd, Northern Division	Won 1st Round (Los Angeles); Won Semifinal (Vancouver); Won Championship (Chicago)	3,975 (15th of 19 teams)
1981	NASL	12	20	—	123	5th, Northwest Division	did not qualify	10,632 (13th of 21 teams)
1981–82	NASL Indoor	13	5	—	—	1st, Northwest Division	Won 1st Round (Seattle); Lost Semifinal (San Diego)	2,943 (11th of 13 teams)
1982	NASL	11	21	—	93	6th, Western Division	did not qualify	4,922 (14th of 14 teams)

== Honours ==
Championships (1)

- NASL indoor: 1980–81

Regular Season/ Division Titles (2)

- NASL: 1980
- NASL indoor: 1981–82

NASL All Stars

- 1980: Peter Nogly -Second Team
- 1981: Peter Nogly -First Team

NASL indoor MVP

- 1980–81: Kai Haaskivi

NASL indoor Scoring Champion

- 1980–81: Kai Haaskivi (co-champion)

NASL indoor Finals MVP

- 1981–82: Kai Haaskivi

NASL indoor All Stars

- 1980–81: Drew Ferguson, Kai Haaskivi
- 1981–82: Jan Goossens, Kai Haaskivi

Canadian Soccer Hall of Fame

- Mike Sweeney: 2002
- Bruce Twamley: 2008

Indoor Soccer Hall of Fame

- Kai Haaskivi: 2013
- Timo Liekoski: 2019
