= 1979 Tampa Bay Rowdies indoor season =

Tampa Bay Rowdies
1979 indoor season
- Owner: (United States) George Strawbridge, Jr.
- General manager: (United States) Chas Serednesky, Jr
- Manager: (England) Gordon Jago
- Stadium: Bayfront Center
- Budweiser Indoor Invitational: runner up
- Top goalscorer: League: (Brazil) Mirandinha (4 goals); All: (South Africa) Steve Wegerle, (Brazil) Mirandinha (5 goals)
- Highest home attendance: 6,342 (Jan. 27 vs. Ft. Lauderdale)
- Lowest home attendance: 6,002 (Feb 2 vs. Houston)
- Average home league attendance: 6,181
Home colors	Away colors

The 1979 Tampa Bay Rowdies indoor season was the fifth indoor season of the club's existence.

== Overview ==
Much to the dismay of Rowdies owner, George Strawbridge, the North American Soccer League owners voted to hold off on a full indoor season for 1978–79 after previously approving it. And just as in the winters of 1977 and 1978, when indoor seasons had been nixed, the NASL did not restrict teams from scheduling indoor matches on their own. The end result of this was that the Major Indoor Soccer League was able to launch its inaugural season from December 1978 though March 1978 with virtually no competition from the NASL.

For their part, Tampa Bay played five indoor games in the Winter of 1979, the last four of which were played at the Bayfront Center. The Rowdies first match, on January 25 against the Houston Hurricane, took on a different complexion than the ones that it preceded, and not just because it was an away game. The Hurricane spent their winters playing indoors in the MISL, as the Houston Summit. Although the Summit were in midseason, the two leagues didn’t officially sanction interleague play, so when facing the Rowdies Houston played under their “Hurricane” moniker. Despite that fact, they wore their Summit uniforms, and the match featured MISL timing (four 15-minute quarters), MISL goal dimensions (6.5’ high x 12’ wide), even a bright orange MISL ball. Ironically, the NASL would wind up adopting the MISL's timing and goal size when they finally began their first full indoor season 10 months later in November 1979.

Tampa Bay's next two matches were part of a two-day, four-team mini-tournament called the 1979 NASL Budweiser Indoor Soccer Invitational. The Rowdies won both of their matches, but lost the title on goal differential to the Dallas Tornado, who had also won both of theirs. The second of those invitational matches saw Tampa Bay goalie, Winston DuBose, become only the second goalkeeper in the NASL’s brief indoor history to record a shutout.

The Rowdies game on February 2 versus the Houston Hurricane (this time played with NASL goals and timing) marked the first time they had ever lost an indoor match at home to a domestic opponent. Tampa Bay's final match of the indoor campaign was an international friendly against FC Dynamo Moscow on February 19. The lopsided, 8–1, loss closed their indoor season record at 3–2. Over 24,700 fans watched the Rowdies at home in 1979, with all but about 650 total tickets being sold for the four matches.

== Club ==
=== Roster ===
No.	Position	Nation	Player
1	GK	USA	Winston DuBose
2	GK	CAN	Željko Bilecki
3	DF	ENG	Malcolm Chandler*
4	DF	HAI	Arsène Auguste
5	MF	NED	Jan van der Veen
6	DF	RSA	Mike Connell
7	FW	RSA	Steve Wegerle
8	MF	CAN	Wes McLeod
10	MF	ENG	Rodney Marsh (capt.)
11	FW	BRA	Mirandinha
12	MF	USA	Perry Van der Beck
13	FW	USA	Dave MacWilliams
14	FW	USA	Peter Chandler
15	MF	IRL	Timothy Collins*
16	DF	ENG	Farrukh Quraishi
17	DF	USA	Tony Crudo
18	DF	USA	Sandje Ivanchukov
19	MF	USA	Tommy Maurer
23	DF	NED	Teun Kist*

*trialist players

=== Management and technical staff ===
- (United States) George W. Strawbridge, Jr., owner
- (United States) Chas Serednesky, Jr., general manager
- (England) Gordon Jago, head coach
- (United States) Ken Shields, trainer
- (United States) Alfredo Beronda, equipment manager

=== Honors ===
- Budweiser Indoor Soccer Invitational: runners-up

== Competitions ==
=== Invitational final standings ===
GF = Goals For, GA = Goals Against, GD = Goal Differential

1979 Budweiser Indoor Soccer Invitational
Team	Record	GF	GA	GD	Position
Dallas Tornado*	2–0	15	9	+6	1st place
Tampa Bay Rowdies	2–0	9	4	+5	2nd place (runners-up)
Tulsa Roughnecks	0–2	7	11	–4	3rd place
Fort Lauderdale Strikers	0–2	6	13	–7	4th place

*Dallas wins Invitational on goal differential

=== Match reports ===
January 25, 1979 1	Houston Hurricane	4–6	Tampa Bay Rowdies	Houston, Texas
8:00 PM (CST)	Vaccaro 15:17' (O’Sullivan); Russell 18:26'; Russell 34:57' (Marasco); Vasquez 48:57' (Stremlau)	Report on p. 2C	Wegerle 00:44' (Marsh); Van der Beck 24:28'; Marsh 24:51' (Connell); Wegerle 31:02'; Connell 44:37'; Wegerle 59:46' (DuBose)	Stadium: The Summit; Attendance: 2,743

January 27, 1979 2 Bud Invit'l	Tampa Bay Rowdies	6–4	Fort Lauderdale Strikers	St. Petersburg, Florida
8:30 PM	Marsh 9:16'; Mirandinha 11:50' (McLeod); Mirandinha 20:44' (Maurer); Maurer 26:38' (Marsh); Wegerle 27:43' (Marsh); Quraishi 28:25' (Mirandinha)	Report 1 Report 2	Njie 20:33' (Wiggemansen); Gemeri 24:37'; Njie 30:21' (Wiggemansen); Vaninger 34:13'	Stadium: Bayfront Center; Attendance: 6,342

January 28, 1979 3 Bud Invit'l	Tampa Bay Rowdies	3–0	Tulsa Roughnecks	St. Petersburg, Florida
7:30 PM	Marsh 1:49' (Wegerle); Mirandinha 17:50' (Marsh); Mirandinha 31:47'	Report on p. 2-C	none	Stadium: Bayfront Center; Attendance: 6,338

February 2, 1979 4	Tampa Bay Rowdies	6–15	Houston Hurricane	St. Petersburg, Florida
8:00 PM	Wegerle 00:17'; McLeod 25:26'; Marsh 28:12'; Mirandinha 31:48' (Marsh); McLeod 43:44' (Quraishi); Quraishi 54:38' (McLeod)	Report	Jump 3:12' (Stremlau); Anderson 8:04' (Haaskivi); Stremlau 9:40' (Anderson); Jump 12:07' (Lindsay); Lindsay 18:14' (Megaloudis); Lindsay 20:38' (Jump); Haaskivi 27:51'; Anderson 29:03' (Megaloudis); Jump 33:33' (Stremlau); Lindsay 33:50'; Charbonneau 34:55' (Haaskivi); Anderson 41:14', Jump'; Maurer, (T.B.) 49:12' (o.g.); Anderson 35:25' (Megaloudis); Anderson 59:19' (Megaloudis)	Stadium: Bayfront Center; Attendance: 6,002

February 19, 1979 5 Int’l friendly	Tampa Bay Rowdies	1–8	FC Dynamo Moscow	St. Petersburg, Florida
8:00 PM	Kist 25:32'	Report on p. 5C	Gershkovich 1:49'; Lovchev 4:43' (Gershkovich); Latysh 12:51'; Yakubik 15:47' (Maksimenkov); Latysh 18:29'; Reznik 35:25' (Latysh); Reznik 46:36' (Latysh); Maksimenkov 56:00' (Gershkovich)	Stadium: Bayfront Center; Attendance: 6,040

== Statistics ==
=== Scoring ===
G = Goals (worth 2 points), A = Assists (worth 1 point), Pts = Points

Player	G	A	Pts
Rodney Marsh	4	6	14
Mirandinha	5	1	11
Steve Wegerle	5	1	11
Wes McLeod	2	2	6
Farrukh Quraishi	2	1	5
Mike Connell	1	1	3
Tommy Maurer	1	1	3
Perry Van der Beck	1	0	2
Teun Kist	1	0	2
Winston DuBose	0	1	1

=== Goalkeeping ===
Note: GP = Games played; Min = Minutes played; GA = Goals against; GAA = Goals against average; W = Wins; L = Losses

Player	GP	Min	GA	GAA	W	L
Winston DuBose	5	250	23	5.52	3	1
Željko Bilecki	1	20	5	15.00	0	1

== See also ==
- 1979 team indoor stats
