= 1979 NASL Budweiser Indoor Soccer Invitational =

Indoor soccer tournament

North American Soccer League -1979 Budweiser Invitational-
Budweiser Indoor Soccer Invitational

Tournament details
- Dates: January 27, 1979 – January 28, 1979
- Teams: 4

Final positions
- Champions: Dallas Tornado (2nd title)
- Runners-up: Tampa Bay Rowdies

Tournament statistics
- Matches played: 4
- Goals scored: 42 (10.5 per match)
- Attendance: 12,680 (3,170 per match)
- Top scorer: (Scotland) Jim Ryan (7 goals)

The 1979 NASL Budweiser Indoor Soccer Invitational was a four-team indoor soccer tournament held at the Bayfront Center in St. Petersburg, Florida on the final weekend of January 1979.

== Overview ==
Four North American Soccer League teams participated in the two-day event; the Dallas Tornado, the Fort Lauderdale Strikers, the Tampa Bay Rowdies, and the Tulsa Roughnecks. Matches were 45 minutes long and divided into three 15-minute periods with an intermission between each. Each session consisted of two games (i.e. a doubleheader). Nearly 12,700 people attended the two sessions. Dallas and Tampa Bay each won both of their matches, but Dallas Tornado were crowned champions based on a greater goal differential. Dallas forward Jim Ryan lead the invitational in scoring with 7 goals. The tournament's final match saw goalkeeper Winston DuBose of Tampa Bay become only the second NASL goalie to record a rare indoor shut-out. Dallas goalkeeper Ken Cooper had accomplished the feat on two previous occasions.

These were not the only indoor games played that winter. With a fully sanctioned season of NASL indoor soccer still eleven months away, NASL teams were free to schedule their own games at that time. Tampa Bay, for example played three other indoor matches. By contrast, Fort Lauderdale scheduled only the two games of the invitational. The competing Major Indoor Soccer League had already begun their first season in December 1978.

== Map of clubs ==
1979 NASL Budweiser Indoor Soccer Invitational Clubs

== Tournament results ==
=== Sessions ===
Session 1: January 27, 1979

7:00 PM EST	Dallas Tornado	8–7	Tulsa Roughnecks	Attendance: 6,342

8:30 PM EST	Tampa Bay Rowdies	6–4	Fort Lauderdale Strikers

Session 2: January 28, 1979

6:00 PM EST	Dallas Tornado	7–2	Fort Lauderdale Strikers	Attendance: 6,338

7:30 PM EST	Tampa Bay Rowdies	3–0	Tulsa Roughnecks

=== Match reports ===
==== Session 1 ====
January 27, 1979 Match 1	Dallas Tornado	8–7	Tulsa Roughnecks	St. Petersburg, Florida
7:00 PM	Ryan (1:46); Collins (6:34); Ley (8:16); Ryan (11:47); Ryan (12:34); Haaskivi (16:46); Haaskivi (37:56); Ley (43:56)	Report 1 Report 2	Mitchell (1:53); Sautter (12:43); Danaeifard (13:24); Earle (17:18); Abrahams (18:23); Abrahams (32:14); Ralbovsky (37:24)	Stadium: Bayfront Center; Attendance: 6,342

January 27, 1979 Match 2	Tampa Bay Rowdies	6–4	Fort Lauderdale Strikers	St. Petersburg, Florida
8:30 PM	Marsh (9:16); Mirandinha (11:50); Mirandinha (20:44); Maurer (26:38); Wegerle (27:43); Quraishi (28:25)	Report 1 Report 2	Njie (20:33); Gemeri (24:37); Njie (30:21); Vaninger (34:13)	Stadium: Bayfront Center; Attendance: 6,342

==== Session 2 ====
January 28, 1979 Match 1	Dallas Tornado	7–2	Fort Lauderdale Strikers	St. Petersburg, Florida
6:00 PM	Ryan (9:38); Collins (16:28); Haaskivi (23:58); Ryan (28:54); Ryan (38:07); Haaskivi (41:04); Ryan (43:38)	Report on p. 2-C	Wiggemansen (14:36); Gemeri (21:01)	Stadium: Bayfront Center; Attendance: 6,338

January 28, 1979 Match 2	Tampa Bay Rowdies	3–0	Tulsa Roughnecks	St. Petersburg, Florida
7:30 PM	Marsh (1:49); Mirandinha (17:50); Mirandinha (31:47)	Report on p. 2-C	none	Stadium: Bayfront Center; Attendance: 6,338

== Final standings ==
GF = Goals For, GA = Goals Against, GD = Goal Differential

1979 Budweiser Indoor Soccer Invitational
Team	League	Record	GF	GA	GD	Position
Dallas Tornado*	NASL	2–0	15	9	+6	1st place
Tampa Bay Rowdies	NASL	2–0	9	4	+5	2nd place (runners-up)
Tulsa Roughnecks	NASL	0–2	7	11	–4	3rd place
Fort Lauderdale Strikers	NASL	0–2	6	13	–7	4th place

*Dallas wins title on goal differential

== Statistical leaders ==
=== Scoring ===
Goals (worth 2 points), Assists (worth 1 point)

Leading scorers	Goals	Assists	Points
(Scotland) Jimmy Ryan (Dallas)	7	1	15
(Finland) Kai Haaskivi (Dallas)	4	5	13
(Brazil) Mirandinha (Tampa Bay)	4	1	9
(England) Rodney Marsh (Tampa Bay)	2	3	7
(England) George Ley (Dallas)	2	1	5
(England) Steve Earle (Tulsa)	1	3	5
(England) Laurie Abrahams (Tulsa)	2	0	4
(United States) Chris Collins (Dallas)	2	0	4
(Canada) Tibor Gemeri (Ft Lauderdale)	2	0	4
(United States) Al Njie (Ft Lauderdale)	2	0	4
(South Africa) Roy Wiggemansen (Ft Lauderdale)	1	2	4

=== Goalkeeping ===
GA = Goals Against, GAA = Goals Against Average, SV = Saves, SF = Shots Faced, % = Save Percentage

Leading Goalkeepers	Minutes	GA	GAA	SV	SF	%	Won	Lost
(United States) Winston DuBose (Tampa Bay)	90	4	2.00	14	18	.778	2	0
(England) Ken Cooper (Dallas)	45	2	2.00	6	8	.750	1	0
(England) Colin Boulton (Tulsa)	90	11	5.50	13	24	.542	0	2
(United States) Steve Zerhusen (Ft. Lauderdale)	90	13	6.50	22	35	.629	0	2
(United States) Billy Phillips (Dallas)	45	7	7.00	10	17	.588	1	0

== Non-tournament matches ==
In addition to the tournament itself, several NASL teams participated in international indoor friendlies, and tune-ups for both the tournament and 1979 outdoor season. Dallas and Houston played twice in December 1978. The Rowdies–Hurricane match on January 25 was played using the MISL-size goals, timing and ball, as the arena was already set up for the Hurricane's alter ego, the MISL's Houston Summit. As part of a six-match, NASL tour in February, perennial Soviet powerhouse FC Dynamo Moscow scheduled three indoor games.

=== Match reports ===
December 1, 1978 1	Houston Hurricane	7–8	Dallas Tornado	Wichita, Kansas
7:30 PM (CST)	Marasco (23:15); Newman (24:50); Morielli (34:25); Morielli (39:30); Morielli (40:06); Vaccaro (48:38); Morielli (49:45)	Report	Garcia (24:15); Renshaw (25:35); Child (29:09); Cervin (37:04); Pecher (44:30); Simões (45:07); Child (45:16); Garcia (53:58)	Stadium: Kansas Coliseum; Attendance: 6,019

December 19, 1978 2	Houston Hurricane	3–7	Dallas Tornado	Houston, Texas
		Report	Garcia,,	Stadium: The Summit; Attendance: 5,007

January 25, 1979 3 (MISL rules)	Houston Hurricane	4–6	Tampa Bay Rowdies	Houston, Texas
8:00 PM (CST)	Vaccaro (15:17); Russell (18:26); Russell (34:57); Vasquez (48:57)	Report on p. 1C; Report B	Wegerle (00:44); Van der Beck (24:28); Marsh (24:51); Wegerle (31:02); Connell (44:37); Wegerle (59:46)	Stadium: The Summit; Attendance: 2,743

February 2, 1979 4	Tampa Bay Rowdies	6–15	Houston Hurricane	St. Petersburg, Florida
8:00 PM (EST)	Wegerle (00:17); McLeod (25:26); Marsh (28:12); Mirandinha (31:48); McLeod (43:44); Quraishi (54:38)	Report A Report on p. 10C	Jump (3:12); Anderson (8:04); Stremlau (9:40); Jump (12:07); Lindsay (18:14); Lindsay (20:38); Haaskivi (27:51); Anderson (29:03); Jump (33:33); Lindsay (33:50); Charbonneau (34:55); Anderson (41:14); Maurer, (T.B.) (49:12); Anderson (35:25); Anderson (59:19)	Stadium: Bayfront Center; Attendance: 6,002

February 2, 1979 5	Tulsa Roughnecks	6–4	Chicago Sting	Wichita, Kansas
7:35 PM (CST)	Earle (3:40); McDonald (18:20); Gazonas; Mitchell 16' (pen.); Abrahams (46:01); Ralbovsky (47:55)	Report 1 Report 2	Wilson (0:32); Nevers (15:26); Ingram; Fajkus (44:26)	Stadium: Britt Brown Arena; Attendance: 4,023

February 13, 1979 6 Int'l friendly	Tulsa Roughnecks	3–10	FC Dynamo Moscow	Tulsa, Oklahoma
7:30 (CST)	Abrahams; Earle (23:30); Sautter (Danaeifard)	Report 1 Report 2	Latysh (8:25); Petrushin; Yakubik,, Reznik,	Stadium: Tulsa Assembly Center; Attendance: 6,166

February 19, 1979 7 Int'l friendly	Tampa Bay Rowdies	1–8	FC Dynamo Moscow	St. Petersburg, Florida
	Kist (25:32)	Report on p. 5C	Gershkovich (1:49); Lovchev (4:43); Latysh (12:51); Yakubik (15:47); Latysh (18:29); Reznik (35:25); Reznik (46:36); Maksimenkov (56:00)	Stadium: Bayfront Center; Attendance: 6,040

February 25, 1979 8 Int'l friendly	Oakland Stompers	Canceled	FC Dynamo Moscow	Oakland, California
Cancelled: Team sold on Feb 19, moved to Edmonton on Feb 22.		Report		Stadium: Oakland-Alameda County Coliseum Arena
Note: NASL approves sale and move to Edmonton

== See also ==
- North American Soccer League
