= 1979 Fort Lauderdale Strikers indoor season =

Fort Lauderdale Strikers
1979 season
- Owner: (United States) Elizabeth Robbie
- General manager: (United States) Beau Rodgers
- Manager: (England) Ron Newman
- NASL indoor: Tournament: Fourth place
- Top goalscorer: (Socialist Federal Republic of Yugoslavia) Tibor Gemeri (2 goals)
Away colors

The 1979 Fort Lauderdale Strikers season was part of the club's twelfth season in professional soccer.

== Background ==
This was not the first instance of the Strikers playing indoors. Their first ever match, indoor or out, was an exhibition match played on February 27, 1977, versus their arch-rival, Tampa Bay Rowdies at the Bayfront Center. In January 1978 they played the Washington Diplomats indoors at the D.C. Armory on back-to-back days. The Strikers lost all of three of these matches.

== Review ==
In January 1979 four NASL teams participated in the Budweiser Indoor Soccer Invitational at the Bayfront Center in St. Petersburg, Florida. The teams were the Dallas Tornado, Ft. Lauderdale Strikers, Tulsa Roughnecks, and the host, Tampa Bay Rowdies. The event was held over two days. The Strikers finished the tournament in fourth place. The team wore a very basic, green and white, adidas uniform for the invitational. It was very similar to the away kit that the West German national team wore during that era, except that the Strikers's numbers on the backs were red and there was no team crest of any kind on the front of the jerseys.

== Competitions ==
=== Budweiser Indoor Soccer Invitational ===
1979 Budweiser Indoor Soccer Invitational
Team	League	Record	Standings	GF	GA	GD
Dallas Tornado*	NASL	2–0	1st place	15	9	+6
Tampa Bay Rowdies	NASL	2–0	2nd place (runners-up)	9	4	+5
Tulsa Roughnecks	NASL	0–2	3rd place	7	11	-4
Fort Lauderdale Strikers	NASL	0–2	4th place	6	13	-7

* Dallas wins title on goal differential

==== Results summaries ====
Session 1: January 27, 1979

7:00 PM EST	Dallas Tornado	8–7	Tulsa Roughnecks	Attendance: 6,342

8:30 PM EST	Tampa Bay Rowdies	6–4	Fort Lauderdale Strikers

Session 2: January 28, 1979

6:00 PM EST	Dallas Tornado	7–2	Fort Lauderdale Strikers	Attendance: 6,338

7:30 PM EST	Tampa Bay Rowdies	3–0	Tulsa Roughnecks

==== Match reports ====
January 27, 1979 1	Tampa Bay Rowdies	6–4	Fort Lauderdale Strikers	St. Petersburg, Florida
8:30 PM	Marsh 9:16'; Mirandinha 11:50' (McLeod); Mirandinha 20:44' (Maurer); Maurer 26:38' (Marsh); Wegerle 27:43' (Marsh); Quraishi 28:25' (Mirandinha)	Report 1 Report 2	Njie 20:33' (Wiggemansen); Gemeri 24:37'; Njie 30:21' (Wiggemansen); Vaninger 34:13'	Stadium: Bayfront Center; Attendance: 6,342

January 28, 1979 2	Dallas Tornado	7–2	Fort Lauderdale Strikers	St. Petersburg, Florida
6:00 PM	Ryan 9:38' (Haaskivi); Collins 16:28' (Haaskivi); Haaskivi 23:58' (Pecher); Ryan 28:54' (Haaskivi); Ryan 38:07' (Waddell); Haaskivi 41:04'; Ryan 43:36'	Report on p. 2-C	Wiggemansen 14:36' (Jones), Gemeri 21:01' (Hudson)	Stadium: Bayfront Center; Attendance: 6,338

== Strikers' indoor matches prior to 1979 ==
February 27, 1977 1	Tampa Bay Rowdies	9–8	Fort Lauderdale Strikers	St. Petersburg, Florida
8:00 p.m. (EST)	Lindsay 4:21' (Wegerle); Smethurst 33:13'; Smethurst 34:04' (Alston); Quraishi 41:34' (Smethurst); Smethurst 41:57' (Wegerle); Wegerle 48:29'; Smethurst 49:30' (Wegerle); Wegerle 50:41'; Alston 51:47' (Smethurst)	Report	Mulroy 12:07' (Nanchoff, Sharp); Sharp 12:27'; Nanchoff 26:40' (Chadwick); Ceballos 44:20' (Sharp); Chadwick 47:40' (Hamlyn, Sharp); Sharp 50:41'; Sharp 58:04'; Hamlyn 59:57'	Stadium: Bayfront Center; Attendance: 5,016; Referee: Sam Hornich

January 7, 1978 2	Washington Diplomats	9–2	Fort Lauderdale Strikers	Washington, D.C.
8:00 p.m. (EST)		Report	Fearnley 14:01' (Nanchoff); Proctor (Bodonczy)	Stadium: D.C. Armory; Attendance: 2,384

January 8, 1978 3	Washington Diplomats	8–5	Fort Lauderdale Strikers	Washington, D.C.
3:00 p.m. (EST)	Garber,, Welch; Darrell; Mishalow; Borozzi; Denkowski	Report	Vaninger, Hamlyn; Aguirre; Nanchoff	Stadium: D.C. Armory; Attendance: 2,163
