= 1979–80 Tampa Bay Rowdies indoor season =

Tampa Bay Rowdies
1979–80 indoor season
- Owner: (United States) George Strawbridge, Jr.
- General manager: (United States) Chas Serednesky, Jr
- Manager: (England) Gordon Jago
- Stadium: Bayfront Center
- NASL: Division: 2nd Playoffs: Champions
- Top goalscorer: League: (Socialist Federal Republic of Yugoslavia) Petar Baralić (21 goals); All: (Socialist Federal Republic of Yugoslavia) Petar Baralić (23 goals)
- Highest home attendance: 6,243 (Feb. 1 vs. Tea Men)
- Lowest home attendance: 5,262 (Dec. 15 vs. Chiefs)
- Average home league attendance: 5,910
Home colors	Away colors

The 1979–80 Tampa Bay Rowdies indoor season was the sixth indoor season of the club's existence.

== Overview ==
The 1979–80 indoor season was the Tampa Bay Rowdies' sixth season of existence, and their sixth season of indoor play. As in previous years, all home games were played at the Bayfront Center in St. Petersburg, Florida. It was the first fully sanctioned indoor season in the North American Soccer League’s history and Tampa Bay lost only once at home. The Rowdies finished second in the Eastern Division, and qualified for the playoffs with an 8–4 record. They won five of six matches in the playoffs en route to winning the Eastern Division crown, the NASL indoor championship, and a 13–5 overall finish. Yugoslavian, Petar Baralić led the club with 21 goals in the regular season, and 23 across all competitions.

=== Playoffs ===
The Rowdies completely dismantled Detroit in the first round with a 12–1 victory. In the Eastern Division championship series they swept top-seeded Atlanta, 7–3 and 6–5. In the Championship finals Memphis took the first game, by a count of 5–4. Tampa Bay stormed back on the return leg, 10–4, to set up a tiebreaker. Peter Anderson scored the only goal of the deciding mini-game to give the NASL indoor title to the Rowdies. South African, Steve Wegerle led the team in the postseason with 11 goals. While presenting the championship trophy to Rowdies captain Jan van der Veen, NASL commissioner Phil Woosnam said, “It was only fitting, because Tampa Bay was instrumental in the development of indoor soccer.”

== Club ==
=== Roster ===
No.	Position	Nation	Player
1	GK	USA	Winston DuBose
2	GK	CAN	Željko Bilecki
3	DF	SCO	John Gorman
4	DF	HAI	Arsène Auguste
5	MF	NED	Jan van der Veen (capt.)
6	DF	RSA	Mike Connell
7	FW	RSA	Steve Wegerle
8	MF	CAN	Wes McLeod
9	FW	ENG	Peter Anderson
12	MF	USA	Perry Van der Beck
13	FW	SCO	Doug Wark
14	DF	USA	Peter Chandler
15	MF	YUG	Petar Baralić
15	DF	IRL	Timothy Collins*
16	DF	ENG	Farrukh Quraishi
18	DF	USA	Sandje Ivanchukov
19	MF	USA	Tommy Maurer
20	FW	CHI	Óscar Fabbiani
21	FW	ENG	Keith Peacock
22	GK	USA	Kevin Clinton

*trialist player

=== Management and technical staff ===
- (United States) George W. Strawbridge, Jr., owner
- (United States) Chas Serednesky, Jr., general manager
- (England) Gordon Jago, head coach
- (England) Keith Peacock, assistant coach
- (United States) Ken Shields, trainer
- (United States) Alfredo Beronda, equipment manager

=== Honors ===
- NASL Indoor Champions: 1979–80
- NASL Eastern Division Indoor Champions: 1979–80

== Regular season ==
=== Final standings ===
W = Wins, L = Losses, GB = Games Behind 1st Place, % = Winning Percentage, GF = Goals For, GA = Goals Against, Avg Att = Average Home Attendance

Eastern Division	W	L	GB	%	GF	GA	Avg Att
Atlanta Chiefs	10	2	–	.833	70	46	5,069
Tampa Bay Rowdies	8	4	2	.667	75	64	5,910
Detroit Express	7	5	3	.583	70	69	3,937
Fort Lauderdale Strikers	3	9	7	.250	58	65	1,724
New England Tea Men	2	10	8	.167	52	81	3,249

=== Results ===
Date	Opponent	Venue	Result	Attendance	Scorers
November 27, 1979	Fort Lauderdale Strikers	A	4–6	2,834	Anderson (2), Baralic (2), Van der Veen (2)
December 3, 1979	Atlanta Chiefs	A	5–4(OT)	6,144	Baralic (2), McLeod (2)
December 7, 1979	Detroit Express	H	11–7	5,910	Van der Veen (4), Wark (3), Auguste, Gorman, Baralic, McLeod
December 15, 1979	Atlanta Chiefs	H	6–2	5,262	Baralic (2), Wark, McLeod, Anderson, Quriashi
December 22, 1979	New England Tea Men	H	5–4	5,675	Baralic (2), Anderson, Gorman, Connell
December 28, 1979	New England Tea Men	A	6–8	3,310	Baralic (2), Wegerle (2), McLeod, Wark, Van der Veen, Anderson
January 2, 1980	Atlanta Chiefs	A	3–2	5,425	McLeod (2)
January 12, 1980	Fort Lauderdale Strikers	H	6–5	6,243	Baralic (2), McLeod (2), Anderson, Gorman
January 22, 1980	Detroit Express	A	5–4(OT)	3,787	Fabbiani, Baralic, Wark, Anderson
February 1, 1980	New England Tea Men	H	7–6(OT)	6,223	McLeod (3), Baralic (3), Connell
February 6, 1980	Fort Lauderdale Strikers	A	8–10	1,468	Fabbiani (4), Wegerle (2), Auguste, McLeod, Van der Beck, Baralic
February 10, 1980	Detroit Express	H	6–9	6,145	Baralic (3), Fabbiani, Van der Beck, Wegerle

== Playoffs ==
=== Bracket ===
First round Single game
E2	Tampa Bay Rowdies	12	x	x
E3	Detroit Express	1	x	x
W2	Minnesota Kicks	3	x	x
W3	Tulsa Roughnecks	2	x	x

Division finals Best-of-3
E1	Atlanta Chiefs	3	5	-
E2	Tampa Bay Rowdies	7	6(OT)	-
W1	Memphis Rogues	3	4(OT)	1
W2	Minnesota Kicks	6	3	0

Championship series Best-of-3
E2	Tampa Bay Rowdies	4	10	1
W1	Memphis Rogues	5	4	0

=== Results ===
Date	Opponent	Venue	Result	Attendance	Scorers
February 19, 1980	Detroit Express	H	12–1	4,880	Fabbiani (3), Wegerle (3), McLeod (2), Connell, Baralic, Gorman, Anderson
February 23, 1980	Atlanta Chiefs	H	7–3	5,545	Wegerle (4), Fabbiani (2), Gorman
February 25, 1980	Atlanta Chiefs	A	5–6(OT)	6,141	McLeod (2), Wegerle (2), Baralic, Quraishi
February 29, 1980	Memphis Rogues (Finals)	A	5–4	9,081	Fabbiani (2), Wegerle, Van der Beck
March 2, 1980	Memphis Rogues (Finals)	H	10–4	5,545	Van der Beck (2), Connell (2), Fabbiani (2), Anderson (2), Wegerle, McLeod
March 2, 1980	Memphis Rogues (Finals)	H	1–0	(Mini-game)	Anderson

== Statistics ==
=== Season scoring ===
GP = Games played, G = Goals (worth 2 points), A = Assists (worth 1 point), Pts = Points, Pen = Penalty Minutes

Player	GP	G	A	Pts	Pen
Petar Baralić	12	21	10	51	2
Wes McLeod	12	13	12	38	2
Peter Anderson	11	7	11	25	1
Jan van der Veen	8	7	7	21	4
Óscar Fabbiani	4	6	7	19	1
Steve Wegerle	11	5	6	16	2
Doug Wark	8	6	2	14	0
John Gorman	12	3	5	11	2
Mike Connell	11	2	6	10	6
Perry Van der Beck	9	2	2	6	6
Farrukh Quraishi	12	1	4	6	8
Arsène Auguste	12	2	1	5	4
Sandje Ivanchukov	12	0	2	2	0
Željko Bilecki	12	0	2	2	2
Tommy Maurer	6	0	0	0	0
Timothy Collins	5	0	0	0	0
Winston DuBose	1	0	0	0	0
Kevin Clinton	1	0	0	0	0

=== Season goalkeeping ===
Note: GP = Games played; Min = Minutes played; GA = Goals against; GAA = Goals against average; W = Wins; L = Losses

Player	GP	Min	Svs	GA	GAA	W	L
Željko Bilecki	12	683	173	54	4.74	8	4
Kevin Clinton	1	30	13	6	12.00	0	0
Winston DuBose	1	15	1	1	4.00	0	0

=== Playoff scoring ===
GP = Games played, G = Goals (worth 2 points), A = Assists (worth 1 point), Pts = Points

Player	GP	G	A	Pts
Steve Wegerle	6	11	7	29
Óscar Fabbiani	6	9	9	27
Wes McLeod	6	5	6	16
Peter Anderson	6	4	3	11
Perry Van der Beck	6	3	4	10
Petar Baralić	6	2	5	9
John Gorman	6	2	4	8
Mike Connell	6	3	1	7
Farrukh Quraishi	6	1	1	3
Sandje Ivanchukov	6	0	2	2

== See also ==
- 1979–80 NASL Indoor season
- 1980 in American soccer
- Tampa Bay Rowdies (1975–1993)
