= Soccer Bowl '78 =

North American Soccer League championship final for the 1978 season

- Event: Soccer Bowl
New York Cosmos	Tampa Bay Rowdies
3	1
- Date: August 27, 1978
- Venue: Giants Stadium, East Rutherford, New Jersey
- Man of the Match: Dennis Tueart
- Referee: Jim Highet (Canada)
- Attendance: 74,901

Soccer Bowl '78 was the North American Soccer League's championship final for the 1978 season. It was the fourth NASL championship under the Soccer Bowl name.

The match was played at Giants Stadium in the New York City suburb of East Rutherford, New Jersey on August 27 between the American Conference champion Tampa Bay Rowdies and the National Conference champion and defending Soccer Bowl champion New York Cosmos (who had dropped "New York" from their name to simply "Cosmos" for only the 1977–78 seasons).

Seeing the large home crowds the Cosmos had drawn during the 1977 NASL season, the league awarded Soccer Bowl hosting duties to the club. The match drew a Soccer Bowl-record 74,901 fans, more than doubling the previous year's attendance at Portland's Civic Stadium. To date, it remains the largest crowd for a professional club soccer championship game in North America.

The Cosmos won the match by a 3–1 score, capturing their third league title and becoming the first repeat champion in NASL history.

== Background ==
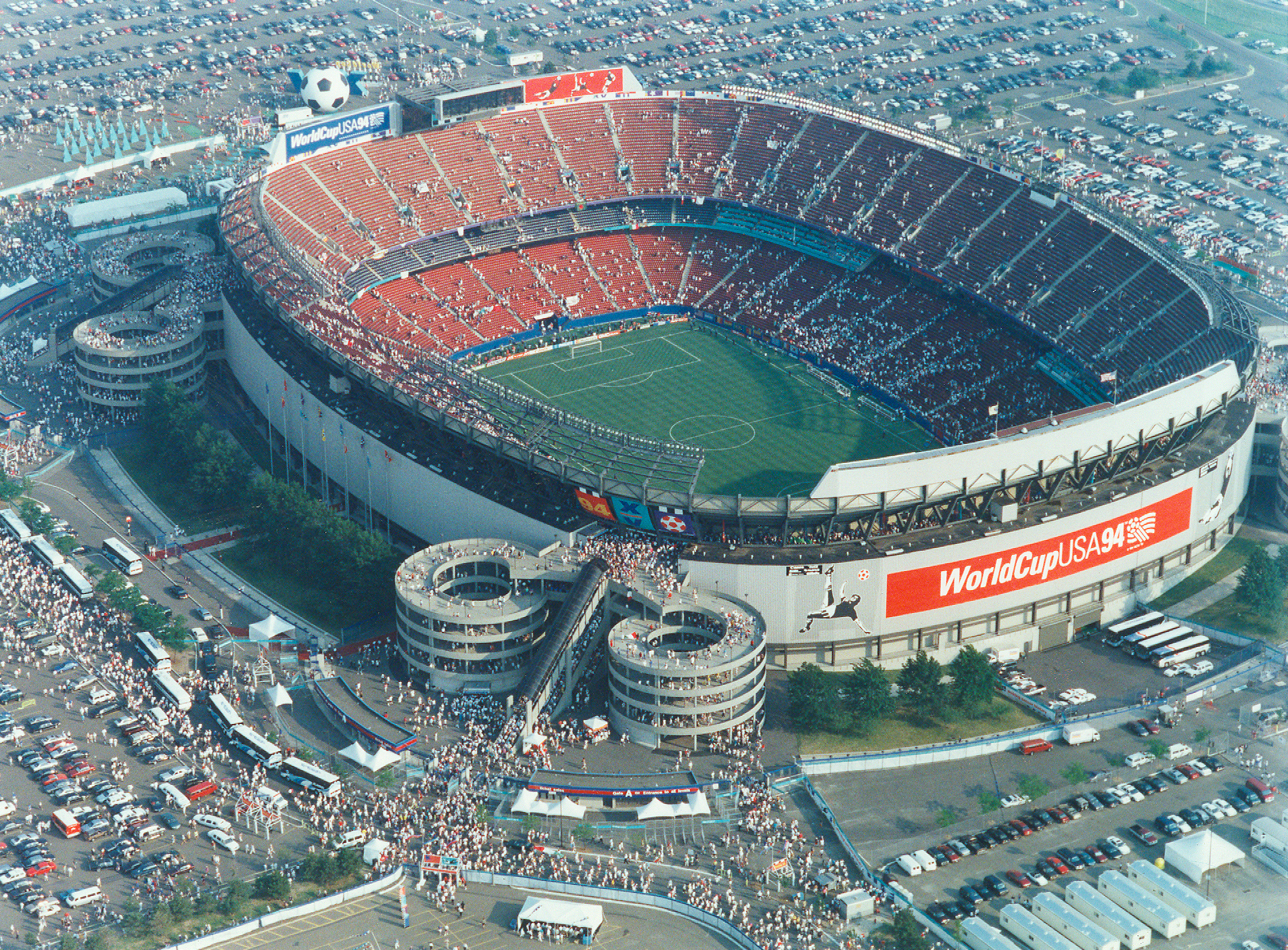
Giants Stadium was the venue for Soccer Bowl '78

=== Tampa Bay Rowdies ===
The Rowdies started off 5-8, but would eventually tie the New England Tea Men for first place in the American Conference's Eastern Division with 165 points. New England won the division on the NASL's total wins tiebreaker (19 to the Rowdies' 18), and relegated Tampa Bay to fourth place in the American Conference's playoff standings. After beating the Chicago Sting in the first round, the San Diego Sockers were defeated by a Rodney Marsh overtime goal in a mini-game tiebreaker and the Fort Lauderdale Strikers fell in a mini-game shootout in the American Conference finals. It would be the Rowdies' second trip to the Soccer Bowl in four years. Marsh led Tampa Bay in scoring with 18 goals and 16 assists for 52 points, good for fourth in the league. Near the end of the deciding match between the Rowdies and Strikers, he had gotten spiked in the shin by Maurice Whittle of Fort Lauderdale. There was concern about his availability, but all indications leading up to match day had looked positive.

=== New York Cosmos ===
While Tampa Bay encountered trouble on the way to Giants Stadium, the Cosmos hit cruise control in early May and never looked back. A 7–0 crushing of the Strikers in the team's opener heralded a run of dominance not seen in the NASL before. A 24-6 record and a league-high 212 points led to a first-place finish in the National Conference Eastern Division as the team looked to become the first back-to-back champions in NASL history. Giorgio Chinaglia's 34 goals and 79 points set league records. The Seattle Sounders fell at the first playoff hurdle, but the Minnesota Kicks proved to be quite a challenge. The Kicks won their playoff opener 9–2 behind Alan Willey's five goals to immediately put the Cosmos on the brink of elimination. However, a 4–0 win in the second game and a dramatic mini-game shootout victory helped the team from New York move on. Two shutout wins over the Portland Timbers in the National Conference championship allowed the Cosmos to become the only team in league history to play in the Soccer Bowl in their own stadium.

== Broadcasters ==
The game was broadcast live in the United States on the TVS network. Jon Miller handled play-by-play duties, while Paul Gardner was the color analyst. This would be the final NASL game broadcast by the network, as the league signed a deal with ABC Sports in the fall of 1978. Gardner would continue as the color analyst for ABC's coverage, while Miller would move on to a long career announcing Major League Baseball.

== Game summary ==
As it turned out, Marsh's shin injury had become infected and he was unable to play. An early-morning run in Central Park confirmed Tampa Bay's worst fears. The Cosmos didn't take advantage early, but Dennis Tueart's goal at 30:42 broke the deadlock. Defender Bob Iarusci broke up an offensive rush, saw Steve Hunt open for a pass and Hunt spotted Tueart standing unmarked to the left of Rowdie goalkeeper Winston DuBose and Tueart made it 1–0. Giorgio Chinaglia's 39th goal of the season made it 2–0 just before halftime. Hunt raced through the Rowdies defense, took a shot which DuBose saved, and the rebound came out to Chinaglia. The league's scoring leader put it away despite the presence of defender Mike Connell, who deflected the ball slightly with his head.

A Mirandinha goal got the Rowdies on the board with fresh hope and 17 minutes left. Tampa Bay midfielder David Robb, switched from forward to defense due to Frantz St. Lot's injury, stole a pass from Tueart in the Cosmos' end and found Mirandinha. The Brazilian fired a low shot off of the Giants Stadium post and past Cosmos goalie Jack Brand to halve the deficit. Tueart closed out the scoring four minutes later by taking a pass from Werner Roth and sliding it past the diving DuBose for the final 3–1 margin.

Dennis Tueart won Soccer Bowl MVP honors for his two-goal effort, while Pino Wilson was named the defensive player of the game. After missing 10 games due to various injuries, Tueart led the NASL in playoff scoring with six goals and five assists for 17 points in six playoff games.

=== Match details ===
August 27
4:00 p.m. EDT

New York Cosmos (Note: The team had shortened its name from "New York Cosmos" to "Cosmos" for only the 1977–78 seasons.)	3–1	Tampa Bay Rowdies
Tueart 31', 77'; Chinaglia 45'	Report 1 Report 2	Mirandinha 74'

Giants Stadium, East Rutherford
Attendance: 74,901
Referee: Jim Highet (Canada)

New York Cosmos	Tampa Bay Rowdies

GK	0	(Canada) Jack Brand
D	19	(Canada) Bob Iarusci
DF	4	(United States) Werner Roth (c)
DF	5	(Brazil) Carlos Alberto	(yellow card) 20:38'
DF	23	(Italy) Giuseppe Wilson
MF	15	(Socialist Federal Republic of Yugoslavia) Vito Dimitrijević		(substituted off) 80:39'
MF	6	(Germany) Franz Beckenbauer
MF	8	(Socialist Federal Republic of Yugoslavia) Vladislav Bogićević		(substituted off) 77:36'
FW	7	(England) Dennis Tueart		(substituted off) 83:35'
FW	9	(Italy) Giorgio Chinaglia
FW	11	(England) Steve Hunt
Substitutes:
MF	12	(Portugal) Seninho		(substituted on) 80:39'
MF	14	(England) Terry Garbett		(substituted on) 77:36'
FW	24	(Canada) Garry Ayre		(substituted on) 83:35'
MF	3	(Brazil) Nelsi Morais
MF	17	(United States) Rick Davis
FW	18	(United States) Fred Grgurev
FW	21	(United States) Gary Etherington
DF	25	(United States) Santiago Formoso
GK	1	(Turkey) Erol Yasin
Manager:
(Italy) Eddie Firmani

GK	18	(United States) Winston DuBose
DF	19	(Haiti) Frantz St. Lot		(substituted off) 56:43'
DF	3	(Scotland) Jim Fleeting
DF	6	(South Africa) Mike Connell
DF	4	(Haiti) Arsène Auguste	(yellow card) 41:15'
MF	13	(England) Mick McGuire		(substituted off) 67:30'
MF	8	(Canada) Wes McLeod
MF	11	(England) Graham Paddon
FW	7	(South Africa) Steve Wegerle
FW	5	(Scotland) David Robb
FW	12	(England) Peter Anderson (c)
Substitutes:
MF	26	(Brazil) Mirandinha		(substituted on) 56:43'
FW	14	(United States) Joey Fink		(substituted on) 67:30'
DF	23	(United States) Tony Crudo
MF	20	(United States) Boris Bandov
MF	21	(United States) Perry Van der Beck
DF	15	(Argentina) Luis Papandrea
DF	17	(United States) Kevin Eagan
DF	22	(United States) Sandje Ivanchukov
GK	27	(England) Nicky Johns
Manager:
(England) Gordon Jago

1978 NASL Champions: Cosmos

Soccer Bowl MVP:
Dennis Tueart (Cosmos)
Assistant referees:
(United States) Jim Ross
(United States) David Socha

Television: TVS
Announcers: Jon Miller, Paul Gardner

== Match statistics ==
First half
Statistic	Cosmos	Tampa Bay
Goals scored	2	0
Total shots	11	5
Shots on target	6	2
Saves	2	4
Corner kicks	3	4
Fouls	x	x
Offsides	x	x
Yellow cards	1	1
Red cards	0	0

Second half
Statistic	Cosmos	Tampa Bay
Goals scored	1	1
Total shots	9	14
Shots on target	2	6
Saves	5	1
Corner kicks	6	3
Fouls	x	x
Offsides	x	x
Yellow cards	0	0
Red cards	0	0

Overall
Statistic	Cosmos	Tampa Bay
Goals scored	3	1
Total shots	20	19
Shots on target	8	8
Saves	7	5
Corner kicks	9	7
Fouls	15	12
Offsides	6	4
Yellow cards	1	1
Red cards	0	0

== Bibliography ==
- Jose, Colin (1989). NASL: A Complete Record of the North American Soccer League. Derby, England: Breedon Books.
- Jose, Colin (2003). North American Soccer League Encyclopedia. Haworth, New Jersey: St. Johann Press.
