= Kevin Clinton =

American soccer player

Personal information
- Place of birth: United States
- Position: Goalkeeper

College career
| Years | Team | Apps | (Gls) |
- Ulster County Community College

Senior career*
| Years | Team | Apps | (Gls) |
| 1979–1981 | Tampa Bay Rowdies (indoor) | 6 | (0) |
| 1980–1982 | Tampa Bay Rowdies | 0 | (0) |
| 1988 | Tampa Bay Rowdies | 0 | (0) |
- * Club domestic league appearances and goals

Kevin Clinton is an American retired soccer goalkeeper who played professionally in the North American Soccer League and third American Soccer League.

== Career ==
Clinton graduated from Ramapo High School in Spring Valley, New York, where he was an All County goalkeeper his senior season. He then attended Ulster County Community College. In 1979, the Tampa Bay Rowdies selected Clinton in the second round (twenty-third overall) of the North American Soccer League draft. The Hartford Hellions of the Major Indoor Soccer League also drafted Clinton, but he chose to sign with the Rowdies. During his three years with the Rowdies, Clinton spent most of the time as backup to Winston DuBose, seeing playing time only during the indoor seasons. In 1988, he returned to the Rowdies, this time in the American Soccer League, but again spent the season as backup to DuBose.

In 1992, Clinton graduated from the University of South Florida with a bachelor's degree in engineering and computer science. Since then he has served in a variety of position in the information technology field.

== Personal life ==
His son Kyle Clinton played for the Tampa Bay Rowdies in 2013 and 2014.
