= Derek Backman =

South African soccer player

Personal information
- Date of birth: January 6, 1966 (age 60)
- Place of birth: South Africa
- Height: 6 ft 0 in (1.83 m)
- Position: Midfielder

Youth career
- Arcadia Shepherds

College career
Years	Team	Apps	(Gls)
1983–1987	College of Boca Raton		

Senior career*
Years	Team	Apps	(Gls)
1988	Tampa Bay Rowdies	?	(4)
1989	Fort Lauderdale Strikers		
1989–1993	Tampa Bay Rowdies		
1994	St. Petersburg Kickers		
1995	Tampa Bay Cyclones		
1996–1997	Tampa Bay Mutiny	28	(0)
- * Club domestic league appearances and goals

Derek Backman (born January 6, 1966) is a South African retired soccer player who played as a midfielder in the USISL. Backman played for the Arcadia Shepherds in his native South Africa before moving to the United States in 1983 to attend the College of Boca Raton. In 1987, Backman and his teammates won the NAIA national men's soccer championship. Backman was also a two time first team NAIA All American. He graduated in 1989 and was inducted into the school's Athletic Hall of Fame in 2004. In 1988, Backman signed with the Tampa Bay Rowdies as it prepared to enter the newly established American Soccer League. He moved to the Fort Lauderdale Strikers for the first part of the 1989 season before returning to the Rowdies for the end of the season. He then remained a regular with the team until sidelined in 1993 with a stress fracture in his left ankle. In 1990, the Rowdies moved to the American Professional Soccer League and folded at the end of the 1993 season. Backman remained in the Tampa area, coaching youth soccer and working in his family's interior design business. He also played with the amateur St. Petersburg Kickers. In 1995, Backman gained his U.S. citizenship. That year, he played for the expansion Tampa Bay Cyclones in the USISL. In February 1996, the Tampa Bay Mutiny selected Backman in the 11th round (107th overall) of the 1996 MLS Inaugural Player Draft. He played 25 games with the Mutiny in 1996, but only three in 1997. He retired in 1998. He currently plays for the amateur team Kaknballz FC, who won the state title in 2017.
