= Jack Brand =

German-Canadian soccer player

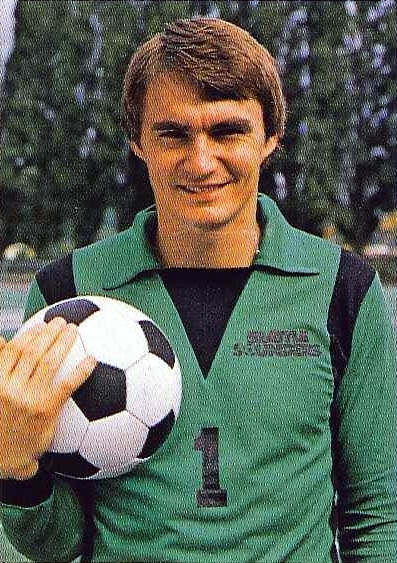
- Brand with the Seattle Sounders in 1980

Personal information
- Date of birth: 4 April 1953 (age 73)
- Place of birth: Braunschweig, West Germany
- Position: Goalkeeper

Senior career*
Years	Team	Apps	(Gls)
1973	Toronto Hungaria	?	(?)
1974	Toronto Metros	14	(0)
1975	Toronto Metros-Croatia	3	(0)
1976	Toronto Italia	?	(?)
1977	Rochester Lancers	31	(0)
1978	New York Cosmos	22	(0)
1979	Tulsa Roughnecks	9	(0)
1980–1982	Seattle Sounders	55	(0)
1982	Tampa Bay Rowdies	14	(0)
1984	F.C. Seattle		

International career
1974	Canada	1	(0)
1975, 1976	Canadian Olympic (senior)	10	(0)
- * Club domestic league appearances and goals

Jack Brand (born 4 April 1953) is a Canadian retired professional soccer goalkeeper. He holds the record for most shutouts in a season in the North American Soccer League with 15 in 1980. He was born in Braunschweig, West Germany. In 2008, Jack was inducted into the Canadian Soccer Hall of Fame

== Soccer career ==
Brand began his senior club career with Toronto Hungaria of the National Soccer League in 1973. In 1974, he joined Toronto Metros of NASL and played 14 regular season games. In '75, he played 2 regular season and 1 play-off game for the Toronto Metros-Croatia. Brand returned to the NSL for 1976, helping Toronto Italia win the league championship. He returned to the NASL for '77, playing 26 regular season games and 5 play-off games for the Rochester Lancers.

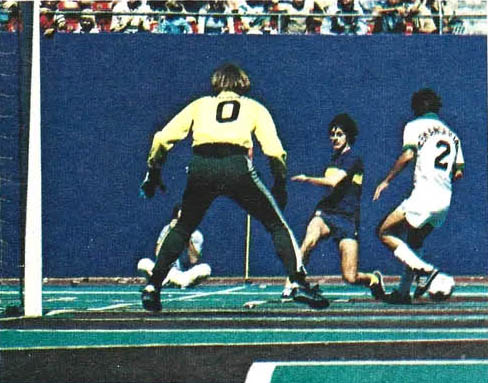
Brand (#0) during a friendly match v Argentine team Boca Juniors in 1978

With the New York Cosmos in 1978, Brand appeared in 10 regular season and 5 play-off games, and was in goal as the Cosmos won Soccer Bowl '78 3–1 over Tampa Bay. The following season after 7 games changed teams and played 4 regular season and 5 play-off games for the Tulsa Roughnecks.

1980 was Brand's career year, playing with the Seattle Sounders. The Sounders went on to post a 25–7 win-lose record, constituting a NASL record for wins in a season. Brand was voted North American Player of the Year and NASL Second Team All-Star in posting a 0.91 GAA and 15 shutouts, also a league record. The following season though the team sputtered to a losing record. Brand played in 23 games. He concluded his NASL career playing 14 contests for the Tampa Bay Rowdies in 1982. In 1984, he played for F.C. Seattle in the F.C. Seattle Challenge Cup. He briefly served as coach of F.C. Seattle before being replaced by Bruce Rioch in February 1985.

Brand was earned his only senior 'A' as a 21-year-old on 28 October 1974 in Budapest in a 1–1 draw. He was Canada's goalkeeper in their home 1976 Summer Olympics. The team was eliminated in the first stage of the tournament, losing 1–2 to the Soviet Union and 1–3 to North Korea. In 6 pre-Olympic friendlies played in Canada in 1975, Brand and the Canucks conceded a whopping 25 goals in 6 losing contests played against the Olympic teams of Poland, Hungary, and East Germany. He also was a member of the Canadian squad at the 1975 Pan American Games.

== Personal ==
Brand comes from a sports family with his parents involved in track and field. He earned a commerce and finance degree from the University of Rochester. In 1978, Brand married his high school sweetheart, Birgit Leveloh. He currently lives in Toronto, where he runs his family's industrial felt company.
