= Tim Walters =

American soccer player

Personal information
- Full name: Timothy Walters
- Date of birth: July 29, 1958 (age 68)
- Place of birth: St. Louis, Missouri, United States
- Height: 5 ft 7 in (1.70 m)
- Position: Forward

College career
Years	Team	Apps	(Gls)
1976–1979	Indiana Hoosiers		

Senior career*
Years	Team	Apps	(Gls)
1980–1982	Denver Avalanche (indoor)	78	(63)
1982–1985	St. Louis Steamers (indoor)	122	(57)
1985–1986	Wichita Wings (indoor)	48	(10)
1986–1987	Tampa Bay Rowdies (indoor)		
1992–1993	St. Louis Ambush (indoor)	33	(12)

Managerial career
- 1996–1998: St. Louis Ambush (assistant)
- * Club domestic league appearances and goals

Timothy Walters is a retired American soccer player. He played professionally in the Western Soccer Alliance and Major Indoor Soccer League.

== Player ==
Walters attended Indiana University where he played for the men's soccer team from 1976 to 1979. In 1980, he turned professional with the Denver Avalanche of the Major Indoor Soccer League. In 1982, he moved to the St. Louis Steamers where he played three seasons. In 1985, he moved to the Wichita Wings. On September 16, 1986, Walters signed with the Tampa Bay Rowdies for their single season in the American Indoor Soccer Association. Walters finished his career with the St. Louis Ambush during the 1992–1993 National Professional Soccer League.

== Coach ==
Walters coached the boys' and girls' soccer teams at Lafayette High School. In 2008, he received the Jimmy Dunn Memorial High School Coach of the Year Award. In addition to coaching high school soccer, Walters served as an assistant coach with the St. Louis Ambush for two seasons (1996–1998). In September 2001, Walters became an assistant coach with the St. Louis Steamers.
