= Dave Power (soccer) =

English-born American footballer

Personal information
- Date of birth: 5 March 1954 (age 72)
- Place of birth: Liverpool, England
- Position: Defender

Youth career
- Everton

Senior career*
Years	Team	Apps	(Gls)
1974–1977	Waterford		
1975–1977	→ New York Apollo (loan)	40	(3)
1978–1980	New York Apollo	23	(1)
1981–1983	Carolina Lightnin'	46	(6)
1984	Tampa Bay Rowdies	1	(0)
1985–1986	Columbus Capitals (indoor)	36	(4)
1986–1987	Tampa Bay Rowdies (indoor)	18	(2)
1986–1990	Tampa Bay Rowdies	61	(0)
- * Club domestic league appearances and goals

Dave Power is an English retired professional footballer.

== Career ==
Power was born in Liverpool, and played on the Everton F.C. youth squad. He began his professional career in Ireland with Waterford F.C. In 1975 while the club was touring the U.S., Waterford struck an on-loan deal for his services with New York Apollo during the summer months. After the 1977 season, he decided to move to the U.S. permanently and signed with the Apollo, winning the ASL title in 1978. In 1981 he followed former Apollo's head coach, Rodney Marsh to the Carolina Lightnin' for three seasons and won his second ASL title. In 1984 he again followed Marsh, this time to the Tampa Bay Rowdies of the NASL, but a broken leg in a friendly against Stoke City F.C. abruptly ended his season after making only one league appearance. Power played two indoor seasons in the American Indoor Soccer Association; one for the Columbus Capitals and one back with Marsh and the Rowdies. He remained with Tampa Bay as they transitioned back to outdoors in the ASL/APSL before retiring in 1990.

Power was a three-time ASL all-star and a two-time ASL champion. He served as team captain in New York for two years, at Carolina for three years and with Tampa Bay for four years. At one time he also served as director of the Rowdies' summer camp youth program, Camp Kickinthegrass.
