= Gerry Morielli =

Italian-Canadian soccer player

Personal information
- Date of birth: February 9, 1958 (age 68)
- Place of birth: Montorio, Italy
- Positions: Forward; midfielder; defender

Senior career*
Years	Team	Apps	(Gls)
1978–1980	Houston Hurricane	14	(1)
1978–1980	Houston Summit (indoor)	51	(36)
1980–1981	Baltimore Blast (indoor)	12	(4)
1981	Hartford Hellions (indoor)	10	(3)
1983	FC Inter-Montréal		
- * Club domestic league appearances and goals

Gerry Morielli is a retired Italian-Canadian soccer player who played professionally in the North American Soccer League and Major Indoor Soccer League.

In 1978, Morielli signed with the Houston Hurricane of the North American Soccer League. He would play three seasons with the Hurricane. In the fall of 1978, he began his indoor career with the Houston Summit of the Major Indoor Soccer League. The Summit drew most of its roster from the Hurricane. After two seasons with the Summit, Morielli moved to the Baltimore Blast for one season before joining the Hartford Hellions. In 1983, he played with FC Inter-Montréal in the Canadian Professional Soccer League.

On January 4, 1979, Morielli played one Olympic qualification game with the Canadian Olympic soccer team in a 3-0 loss to Bermuda. He then played two Pan American Games qualifiers later in the year.
