= Dale Russell (soccer) =

US international soccer player (born 1955)

Personal information
- Date of birth: January 19, 1955 (age 71)
- Place of birth: Warwick Parish, Bermuda
- Positions: Midfielder; forward

Youth career
- 1973–1976: Philadelphia Textile

Senior career*
Years	Team	Apps	(Gls)
1977	Portland Timbers	0	(0)
1977	Tampa Bay Rowdies	0	(0)
1978–1980	Houston Hurricane	68	(10)
1979–1980	Houston Summit (indoor)	32	(26)
1980–1982	Philadelphia Fever (indoor)	68	(31)
1982–1983	St. Louis Steamers (indoor)	34	(10)
1983–1984	Chicago Sting (indoor)	19	(5)

International career
1978	United States	1	(0)
- * Club domestic league appearances and goals

Dale Russell (born 19 January 1955) is a U.S. retired soccer forward who played in the North American Soccer League and the Major Indoor Soccer League. He also earned one cap with the U.S. national team. Born in Bermuda, he played college soccer at Philadelphia Textile, where he was a four-time All American.

== College ==
While born in Bermuda, Russell attended Philadelphia Textile where he played on the men's soccer team from 1973 to 1976. He was a four-time All American, second team as a freshman and first team each of his next three seasons. He is the school's career leader in points (198), goals (71) and is second in career assists with 55. He also led the 1974 NCAA post-season tournament with six goals and one assist for thirteen points.

== Professional ==
=== NASL ===
On January 12, 1977, the Portland Timbers of the North American Soccer League selected Russell with the first round (third pick) of the NASL draft. He never played for Portland. The Tampa Bay Rowdies drafted him in a special re-entry draft in March 1977, but he never suited up for them either. In 1978 the expansion Houston Hurricanes signed Russell. He spent three seasons with the Hurricanes.

=== MISL ===
When the Houston Summit entered Indoor Soccer League (MISL) in 1978, the team drew most of its roster from the NASL Hurricanes. The Summitt went to the MISL championship in the 1979–1980 season. They fell to the New York Arrows, 7–4, with one Houston goal coming from Russell. He finished the season with twenty-six goals. In 1980, he moved to the Philadelphia Fever for two seasons. In 1982, he signed with the St. Louis Steamers where he again spent two seasons. He also spent the 1983–1984 season with the Chicago Sting.

== National team ==
Russell earned his one cap with the U.S. national team in a 1–0 loss to Portugal on September 20, 1978. He started, but came off for Al Trost.

== Personal life ==
His father Earl is regarded as one of Bermuda's best ever players.
