= Tommy Maurer =

German-American soccer player

Personal information
- Full name: Thomas Maurer
- Date of birth: January 7, 1960 (age 66)
- Place of birth: Frankfurt, West Germany
- Position: Midfielder

Youth career
- 1975-1977: Pennsbury High School

Senior career*
Years	Team	Apps	(Gls)
1978-1979	Tampa Bay Rowdies	0	(0)
1979-1980	Tampa Bay Rowdies (indoor)	8	(1)
1981	San Diego Sockers		
- * Club domestic league appearances and goals

Tommy Maurer (born January 7, 1960) is a former North American Soccer League midfielder.

== Career ==
=== Youth ===
In 1970 his family moved to U.S. from West Germany, but with no local youth soccer leagues available Maurer started his while in the 5th grade. He was a high school All-American, and the top high school player in Pennsylvania while at Pennsbury High School in Fairless Hills, Pennsylvania. Between his junior and senior years of high school he joined 14 other Bucks County, Pennsylvania youth players on tour in France and West Germany in 1977.

=== Professional ===
In 1978, the Tampa Bay Rowdies of the North American Soccer League selected Maurer in the third round of the NASL draft, a few picks after future teammates Perry Van der Beck and Sandje Ivanchukov. They were among the first Americans ever drafted out of high school. Rowdies head coach Gordon Jago sent him to train with the German 2nd Division side, Rot-Weiss Essen, as well as with English clubs Crystal Palace, Millwell and Dullwhich Hamlet. Unlike Van der Beck and Ivanchukov, Maurer saw very limited action in Tampa, appearing only in indoor matches and club friendlies between 1978 and 1980.

After being waived by the Rowdies he headed to Southern California and tried to catch on first with the California Surf, and then the San Diego Sockers, even signing with the latter, but he never featured in a regular-season match outdoors for either club.

== Youth soccer ==
Years later he was recruited to coach by a former Tampa Bay teammate, Guy Newman, who was at the time the director of the Del Mar Carmel Valley Sharks soccer club in California. Beginning in 2005, Maurer served as assistant director of the club's boys program. He later became director of the entire recreational program. In 2012 he began a new youth club in the region called Borussia Del Mar. Maurer holds a USSF "E" coaching license.
