= Howie Charbonneau =

American soccer player

Personal information
- Date of birth: June 12, 1955 (age 71)
- Place of birth: Troy, New York, U.S.
- Position: Defender

College career
| Years | Team | Apps | (Gls) |
| 1973–1976 | Hartwick Hawks | | |

Senior career*
| Years | Team | Apps | (Gls) |
| 1977 | California Sunshine | 21 | |
| 1978–1980 | Houston Hurricane | 47 | (1) |
| 1978–1979 | Houston Summitt (indoor) | 23 | (4) |
| 1979 | Pittsburgh Spirit (indoor) | 6 | (1) |
| 1979–1980 | Hartford Hellions (indoor) | 17 | (0) |
| 1981 | New York Eagles | | |
| 1981–1982 | New Jersey Rockets (indoor) | 18 | (0) |
- * Club domestic league appearances and goals

Howie Charbonneau (born June 12, 1955) is an American retired soccer defender who played professionally in the North American Soccer League, the American Soccer League and Major Indoor Soccer League.

== Career ==
Charbonneau began high school at Shaker High School before transferring to Shenendehowa High School before his junior year. In high school, he played soccer and ran track. Charbonneau attended Hartwick College, playing on the men's soccer team from 1973 to 1976. The Tampa Bay Rowdies selected him as the 71st pick of the 1977 NASL draft, but did not make the roster. He then joined the California Sunshine of ASL. In 1978, he signed with the Houston Hurricane of the NASL where he spent three seasons. That fall, he and much of the Hurricane roster was signed to form the core of the Houston Summitt of the MISL. He continued to play for the Hurricane during the summer and indoors with MISL teams during the winter. In 1979, he began the MISL season with the Pittsburgh Spirit before being traded to the Hartford Hellions. He spent 1981 back in the ASL with the New York Eagles. He also played the 1981–82 MISL season with the New Jersey Rockets.
