= Tampa Bay Terror =

American indoor soccer team

The Tampa Bay Terror was the name of an indoor soccer team based in the Tampa Bay, Florida area that competed in the defunct National Professional Soccer League (NPSL). The team existed for two seasons before folding: 1995–1996 and 1996–1997. The team's home games were held at the Bayfront Center in St. Petersburg. In the two seasons that the Terror played in the NPSL.

== Year-by-year record ==
Year	Record	Regular season	Playoffs	Avg. attendance
1995–96	14–26	6th American Division	Did not qualify	1,828
1996–97	15–25	4th East Division	First Round	2,073

== Head coach ==
- (England) Kenny Cooper Sr. 1995–1996
- (United States) Perry Van der Beck 1996–1997
