= Chris Collins (soccer) =

American soccer player (born 1956)

Personal information
- Date of birth: March 8, 1956 (age 70)
- Place of birth: Ontario, New York, U.S.
- Positions: Midfielder; defender

Youth career
- 1974–1977: SUNY Oneonta

Senior career*
Years	Team	Apps	(Gls)
1978–1981	Dallas Tornado	30	(0)
1979–1980	Wichita Wings (indoor)	31	(11)
1980–1981	Dallas Tornado (indoor)	18	(7)
- * Club domestic league appearances and goals

Chris Collins is an American retired soccer player who played professionally in the North American Soccer League and Major Indoor Soccer League.

Collins attended school in the Wayne Central School District where he played both basketball and soccer. He attended SUNY Oneonta where he was the captain of the men's soccer team for three seasons. In 1978, the Dallas Tornado selected Collins in the second round of the North American Soccer League. He played outdoor soccer with the Tornado through the 1981 season. He also played the 1979-1980 indoor season with the Wichita Wings of the Major Indoor Soccer League and the 1980-1981 NASL indoor season with the Dallas Tornado.
