= Jan van der Veen =

Dutch footballer (born 1948)

- van der Veen with Sparta in 1973

Personal information
- Date of birth: 6 July 1948 (age 78)
- Place of birth: Meppel, Netherlands
- Position: Midfielder

Senior career*
Years	Team	Apps	(Gls)
1967–1976	Sparta Rotterdam	257	(9)
1976–1978	Royal Antwerp	50	(3)
1978	San Diego Sockers	23	(0)
1978–1979	Go Ahead Eagles	13	(0)
1979–1981	Tampa Bay Rowdies	66	(9)
1979–1981	Tampa Bay Rowdies (indoor)	26	(19)
1981	California Surf	21	(4)
1981–1982	Phoenix Inferno (indoor)	20	(20)
1981–1983	Willem II	63	(1)
1983	Tampa Bay Rowdies	17	(3)
1983–1984	Wichita Wings (indoor)	40	(16)
1984–1985	Helmond Sport	29	(0)
- * Club domestic league appearances and goals

Jan van der Veen (born 6 July 1948) is a Dutch retired professional footballer who played for Sparta Rotterdam, Royal Antwerp, Go Ahead Eagles, Willem II and Helmond Sport. He also played in the NASL between 1978 and 1983 for the San Diego Sockers, Tampa Bay Rowdies and California Surf. van der Veen scored Tampa Bay's lone goal in the 22nd minute of Soccer Bowl '79 (NASL league final), which the Rowdies lost 2–1. He also played in the Major Indoor Soccer League for the Phoenix Inferno and the Wichita Wings.
