= Nikolai Latysh =

Russian football coach (born 1955)

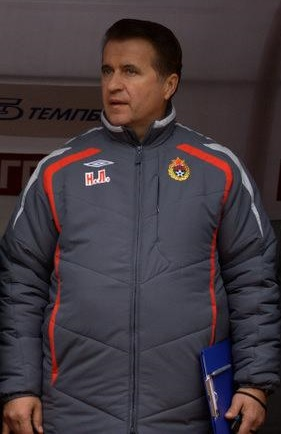
- Latysh in 2007

Personal information
- Full name: Nikolai Ivanovich Latysh
- Date of birth: 2 August 1955 (age 71)
- Place of birth: Oleksandriia, Ukrainian SSR
- Height: 1.77 m (5 ft 10 in)
- Positions: Forward; midfielder

Team information
- Current team: FC Tobol (assistant coach)

Senior career*
Years	Team	Apps	(Gls)
1971–1972	FC Shakhtar Oleksandriia		
1973–1976	FC Zirka Kirovohrad	79	(4)
1976–1978	FC Shakhtar Donetsk	34	(11)
1979–1984	FC Dynamo Moscow	124	(20)
1984–1985	FC Zirka Kirovohrad	61	(8)
1986	FC Spartak Moscow	5	(0)
1986–1987	FC Zirka Kirovohrad	28	(2)
1987–1988	FC Arsenal Tula	44	(12)
1989–1990	FC Druzhba Maykop	51	(16)
1991	FC Zirka Kirovohrad	1	(0)

Managerial career
- 1991: FC Zirka Kirovohrad
- 1991–1994: FC Dynamo Moscow (assistant)
- 1995–1999: FC Alania Vladikavkaz (assistant)
- 2000–2001: FC Dynamo Moscow (assistant)
- 2001–2002: Russia U21 (assistant)
- 2002–2003: PFC CSKA Moscow (assistant)
- 2002–2004: Russia (assistant)
- 2004–2008: PFC CSKA Moscow (assistant)
- 2006: Russia (assistant)
- 2009–2010: FC Dynamo Kyiv (assistant)
- 2011–2014: FC Alania Vladikavkaz (assistant)
- 2014–2015: FC Aktobe (assistant)
- 2018: FC Urozhay Krasnodar (assistant)
- 2019–: FC Tobol (assistant)
- * Club domestic league appearances and goals

Nikolai Ivanovich Latysh (Russian: Николай Иванович Латыш; born 2 August 1955) is a Russian professional football coach and a former player from Ukraine. He is an assistant manager with FC Tobol.

== Playing career ==
As a player, he made his professional debut in the Soviet Top League in 1976 for FC Shakhtar Donetsk.

== Coaching career ==
From 26 June to 18 July 2018, Nikolai was an assistant manager with FC Urozhay Krasnodar.

== Honours ==
- Soviet Top League bronze: 1978, 1986.
- Soviet Cup winner: 1984.

== European club competitions ==
With FC Dynamo Moscow.

- European Cup Winners' Cup 1979–80: 1 game.
- UEFA Cup 1980–81: 1 game.
- UEFA Cup 1982–83: 2 games.
