= Yuriy Reznyk =

Ukrainian footballer and coach

Personal information
- Full name: Yuriy Ivanovych Reznyk
- Date of birth: 13 August 1954 (age 72)
- Place of birth: Poltava, Ukrainian SSR
- Height: 1.75 m (5 ft 9 in)
- Positions: Midfielder; striker

Senior career*
Years	Team	Apps	(Gls)
1971–1972	Budivelnyk Poltava		
1973	Hranit Cherkasy		
1973–1974	SK Chernihiv		
1975–1978	Shakhtar Donetsk	87	(20)
1979–1982	Dynamo Moscow	80	(7)
1983	Spartak Moscow	25	(4)
1985–1989	Vorskla Poltava	124	(32)

Managerial career
- 1989: Vorskla Poltava (assistant)
- * Club domestic league appearances and goals

Yuriy Ivanovych Reznyk (Ukrainian: Юрій Іванович Резник; born 13 August 1954) is a Soviet and Ukrainian former professional footballer and coach.

== Club career ==
He made his professional debut in the Soviet Second League in 1971 for FC Stroitel Poltava.

== Honours ==
- Soviet Top League runner-up: 1975, 1983.
- Soviet Top League bronze: 1978.

== European club competitions ==
With FC Dynamo Moscow.

- European Cup Winners' Cup 1979–80: 3 games.
- UEFA Cup 1980–81: 2 games.
