= Sandje Ivanchukov =

American soccer player

Sandje Saranovich Ivanchukov
- Sandje Ivanchukov in 1979

Personal information
- Full name: Sandje S. Ivanchukov
- Date of birth: July 23, 1960
- Place of birth: Neptune Township, New Jersey, United States
- Date of death: August 29, 2007 (aged 47)
- Place of death: Wilkes-Barre, Pennsylvania, United States
- Position: Defender

Youth career
- 1975–1977: Howell High School

Senior career*
Years	Team	Apps	(Gls)
1978–1980	Tampa Bay Rowdies	12	(0)
1979–1980	Tampa Bay Rowdies (indoor)	12	(0)
1980	San Jose Earthquakes	2	(0)
1981	New England Sharks		
1981–1982	Philadelphia Fever (indoor)		
1982	Pennsylvania Stoners		
- * Club domestic league appearances and goals

Sandje Ivanchukov (Russian: Санджи Саранович Иванчуков, Oirat: Иванчукан Санҗ, romanized: İvançukan Sanc, July 23, 1960 – August 29, 2007) was an American soccer defender who played professionally in the North American Soccer League, American Soccer League and Major Indoor Soccer League.

== Youth ==
Ethnically Kalmyk Mongol, Ivanchukov's father, Saran Ivanchukov, immigrated to the United States from Bulgaria where he had played on the Bulgarian national team. Born in Neptune Township, New Jersey, Ivanchukov grew up in Howell Township and graduated from Howell High School. He was a 1977 Second Team NSCAA High School All American soccer player.

== Professional ==
In 1978, the Tampa Bay Rowdies drafted Ivanchukov out of high school. He signed on an amateur contract in order to maintain his eligibility for the Olympic team. He played two and a half outdoor and one indoor season with Tampa Bay. In June 1980, the Rowdies traded Ivanchukov to the San Jose Earthquakes. The Earthquakes released him at the end of the season. In 1981, he played for the New England Sharks of the American Soccer League. In the fall of 1981, he joined the Philadelphia Fever of the Major Indoor Soccer League and spent the 1982 season with the Pennsylvania Stoners of the American Soccer League.

== National team ==
Ivanchukov played for the national youth teams. In 1979, he was a member of the U.S. soccer team at the 1979 Pan American Games.

Ivanchukov later gained his degree from DeVry Technical Institute in computer robotics.
