= Tibor Gemeri =

Canadian soccer player

Personal information
- Date of birth: April 29, 1951 (age 75)
- Place of birth: Subotica, FPR Yugoslavia
- Height: 1.73 m (5 ft 8 in)
- Position: Midfielder

Senior career*
Years	Team	Apps	(Gls)
1974–1975	Crvenka		
1975–1976	Serbian White Eagles		
1976	Utah Golden Spikers		
1977	Toronto Italia		
1978–1981	Fort Lauderdale Strikers	49	(1)
1981	Toronto Blizzard	9	(2)

International career
1980	Canada	1	(0)
- * Club domestic league appearances and goals

Tibor Gemeri (born April 29, 1951) is a retired soccer player. Born in Yugoslavia, he represented the Canada national team.

== Career ==
Born in Subotica, SR Serbia, SFR Yugoslavia, he played with FK Crvenka in the Yugoslav Second League before moving to Canada in 1975. Initially he played in the National Soccer League with the Serbian White Eagles FC, and in 1977 with Toronto Italia. He played club football for the Fort Lauderdale Strikers and the Toronto Blizzard in the North American Soccer League.

== International career ==
Gemeri made his debut for Canada in a scoreless draw on October 25, 1980 in a World Cup qualification match against the United States in Fort Lauderdale. He was replaced at half time by Mike Sweeney.
