= Mirandinha (footballer, born 1952) =

Brazilian footballer

Personal information
- Full name: Sebastião Miranda da Silva Filho
- Date of birth: 26 February 1952 (age 74)
- Place of birth: Bebedouro, São Paulo, Brazil
- Position: Forward

Senior career*
Years	Team	Apps	(Gls)
1969–1970	América-SP		
1970–1973	Corinthians	76	(39)
1974–1978	São Paulo	28	(11)
1978–1979	Tampa Bay Rowdies	20	(3)
1979	Tampa Bay Rowdies (indoor)	5	(5)
1979	Memphis Rogues	12	(5)
1981	Atlético-GO		
1981–1982	Tigres		
1983	Taubaté		
1985	Ginásio Pinhalense-SP		

International career
1974	Brazil	6	(0)
- * Club domestic league appearances and goals

Sebastião Miranda da Silva Filho, usually called Mirandinha, (born 26 February 1952) is a Brazilian former footballer who played as a forward. At international level, he was included in the Brazilian squad for the 1974 FIFA World Cup.

== Club career ==
Mirandinha spent his early career in Brazil. In 1978, São Paulo sent him to the Tampa Bay Rowdies midway through the North American Soccer League season. That season, the Rowdies went to the championship where they fell to the New York Cosmos. Mirandinha scored the lone Rowdies goal in the 3–1 Soccer Bowl '78 loss. He also co-led the team in goals for the Rowdies' brief winter indoor campaign of 1979, scoring five times in five matches. He began the 1979 season in Tampa Bay before being traded to the Memphis Rogues on 7 June 1979.

Other clubs may have included ABC-RN, Guará-DF, Douradense-MS, União de Mogi-SP, Saad-SP, Independente de Limeira

== International career ==
Mirandinha earned four caps with the Brazil national team at the 1974 FIFA World Cup, scoring no goals and accumulating one yellow card in a first round match versus Zaire. His other appearances included once as a starter in a 0–0 tie against Scotland in the first round, and twice more as a second-half substitute in losses to Netherlands in the second round and to Poland in the third place match. He was also an unused substitute in three additional matches in the tournament.

== Honours ==
=== Player ===
São Paulo

- Campeonato Paulista: 1975
- Campeonato Brasileiro: 1977

=== Manager ===
CENE

- Campeonato Sul-Mato-Grossense: 2002, 2005, 2011
