= Denny Vaninger =

American soccer player and coach

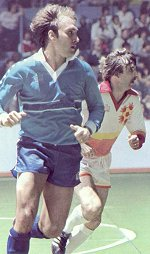

Personal information
- Full name: Dennis Vaninger
- Date of birth: March 14, 1952 (age 74)
- Place of birth: St. Louis, Missouri, United States
- Position: Forward

Youth career
- 1970–1972: St. Louis Florisant

Senior career*
Years	Team	Apps	(Gls)
1971–1972	St. Louis Kutis		
1972	Serbian White Eagles		
1973–1977	St. Louis Stars	71	(22)
1974	St. Louis Stars (indoor)	1	(4)
1978–1979	Fort Lauderdale Strikers	20	(3)
1979	New Jersey Americans		
1980	Miami Americans		
1980–1982	St. Louis Steamers (indoor)		

International career
1974–1975	United States	3	(1)

Managerial career
- 1989–1990: St. Louis Storm (assistant)
- * Club domestic league appearances and goals

Dennis "Denny" Vaninger is a former U.S. soccer forward who spent seven seasons in the North American Soccer League and at least two seasons in Major Indoor Soccer League. He earned three caps, scoring one goal, with the U.S. national team. He also won the 1971 U.S. Amateur Cup with St. Louis Kutis. He continues to coach youth soccer in his hometown of St. Louis, Missouri.

== Player ==
=== Early career ===
Vaninger grew up in St. Louis, Missouri and attended St. Mary's High School where he played on the boys' soccer team. The team won the 1970 Missouri State high school championship. That season, Vaninger scored twenty-three goals. After graduating from high school, Vaninger attended St. Louis Florisant Valley Community College from 1970 to 1972. He played two seasons on the school's soccer team, earning junior college All-American honors both seasons. Florisant Valley won the national junior college championship in both 1970 and 1971. In addition to playing with Florisant Valley, Vaninger was also a member of St. Louis Kutis. In 1971, Kutis won the U.S. National Amateur Cup. Vaninger assisted on the third of Kutis' four goals in their 4–1 win over Cleveland, Ohio club Inter-Italian. In 1972, he also played abroad in the National Soccer League with the Serbian White Eagles.

=== Professional ===
In 1973, Vaninger signed with the St. Louis Stars of the North American Soccer League (NASL). In an 11–4 indoor dismantling at the hands of the visiting Red Army team on February 13, 1974, he accounted for all four Stars' goals. Vaninger spent five seasons with the Stars until they folded at the end of the 1977 season. He then moved to the Fort Lauderdale Strikers for the 1978 and 1979 seasons. However, in 1979, he played only one game and left the NASL to sign for the New Jersey Americans. In 1980, he joined the Miami Americans of the American Soccer League where he played for one season. In 1980, Vaninger signed with the expansion St. Louis Steamers of Major Indoor Soccer League (MISL). He played two seasons with the Steamers until 1982. Some sources state that he continued to play professionally until 1983. Vaninger is tied for the MISL record with 3 powerplay goals in one game.

=== National team ===
Vaninger earned three caps with the U.S. national team in 1974 and 1975. His first game came September 5, 1974, when he scored the lone U.S. goal in a 3–1 loss to Mexico. His last game came in a March 26, 1975 loss to Poland in Poland.

== Coach ==
In 1989, the expansion St. Louis Storm of MISL hired Vaninger as an assistant coach. In 1990, he became the Director of Youth Development. Vaninger was the director of the Busch soccer club before being replaced by Steve Pecher in 1999 when he left to become the Director of Coaching and Education for the Missouri Youth Soccer Association.

In 2002, Vaninger was inducted in the St. Louis Soccer Players Hall of Fame.

In 2020, Vaninger was inducted in the St. Louis Sports Hall of Fame.
