= Al Njie =

American soccer player

Personal information
- Full name: Alieu Njie
- Date of birth: April 15, 1955 (age 71)
- Place of birth: Atlanta, Georgia, U.S.
- Height: 5 ft 11 in (1.80 m)
- Position: Forward

Youth career
- 1977–1978: FIU Golden Panthers

Senior career*
Years	Team	Apps	(Gls)
1979	Fort Lauderdale Strikers	6	(0)
1979–1980	Fort Lauderdale Strikers (indoor)		
1980	Miami Americans		
1980–1981	Phoenix Inferno (indoor)	6	(2)
- * Club domestic league appearances and goals

Alieu Njie is an American retired soccer forward who played professionally in the North American Soccer League, American Soccer League and Major Indoor Soccer League.

Njie attended Florida International University, playing on the men's soccer team in 1977 and 1978. In 1979, the Fort Lauderdale Strikers selected Njie in the North American Soccer League college draft. He spent the 1979 NASL outdoor and 1979–1980 NASL indoor seasons with the Strikers. In 1980, the Strikers released Njie and he signed with the Miami Americans of the American Soccer League. He returned to the indoor game in the fall of 1980, this time with the Phoenix Inferno of the Major Indoor Soccer League.
