= Mark Lindsay (footballer) =

English footballer

Personal information
- Full name: Mark Edward Lindsay
- Date of birth: 6 March 1955 (age 71)
- Place of birth: Lambeth, England
- Height: 5 ft 10 in (1.78 m)
- Position: Midfielder

Youth career
- –1973: Crystal Palace

Senior career*
| Years | Team | Apps | (Gls) |
| 1973–1975 | Crystal Palace | 30 | (0) |
| 1975–1977 | Tampa Bay Rowdies | 59 | (6) |
| 1975–1978 | Tampa Bay Rowdies (indoor) | 11 | (7) |
| 1978 | Houston Hurricane (indoor) | | |
| 1978–1979 | Houston Hurricane | 12 | (4) |
| 1978–1979 | Houston Summit (indoor) | 10 | (3) |
| 1979–1981 | California Surf | 65 | (10) |
| 1979–1981 | California Surf (indoor) | 30 | (25) |
| 1981 | San Jose Earthquakes | 16 | (4) |
| 1981–1982 | Jacksonville Tea Men (indoor) | 16 | (9) |
| 1982 | Jacksonville Tea Men | 29 | (1) |
| 1982–1983 | Baltimore Blast (indoor) | 13 | (2) |
| 1983–1984 | Los Angeles Lazers (indoor) | 40 | (11) |
| 1984 | Tampa Bay Rowdies | 7 | (0) |
| 1986–1987 | Tampa Bay Rowdies (indoor) | | |
| Total | | 338 | (82) |
- * Club domestic league appearances and goals

Mark Edward Lindsay (born 6 March 1955) is an English retired professional footballer who played as a midfielder.

== Career ==
Born in Lambeth, Lindsay began his youth career at Crystal Palace, and signed professional terms in August 1973. He made 30 appearances in the Football League for the club.

He later played in the United States, spending nine seasons in the North American Soccer League, three in the Major Indoor Soccer League, and one in the American Indoor Soccer Association, playing with Tampa Bay Rowdies, Houston Hurricane, Houston Summit, California Surf, San Jose Earthquakes, Jacksonville Tea Men, Baltimore Blast and Los Angeles Lazers.
