= Steve Wegerle =

South African soccer player

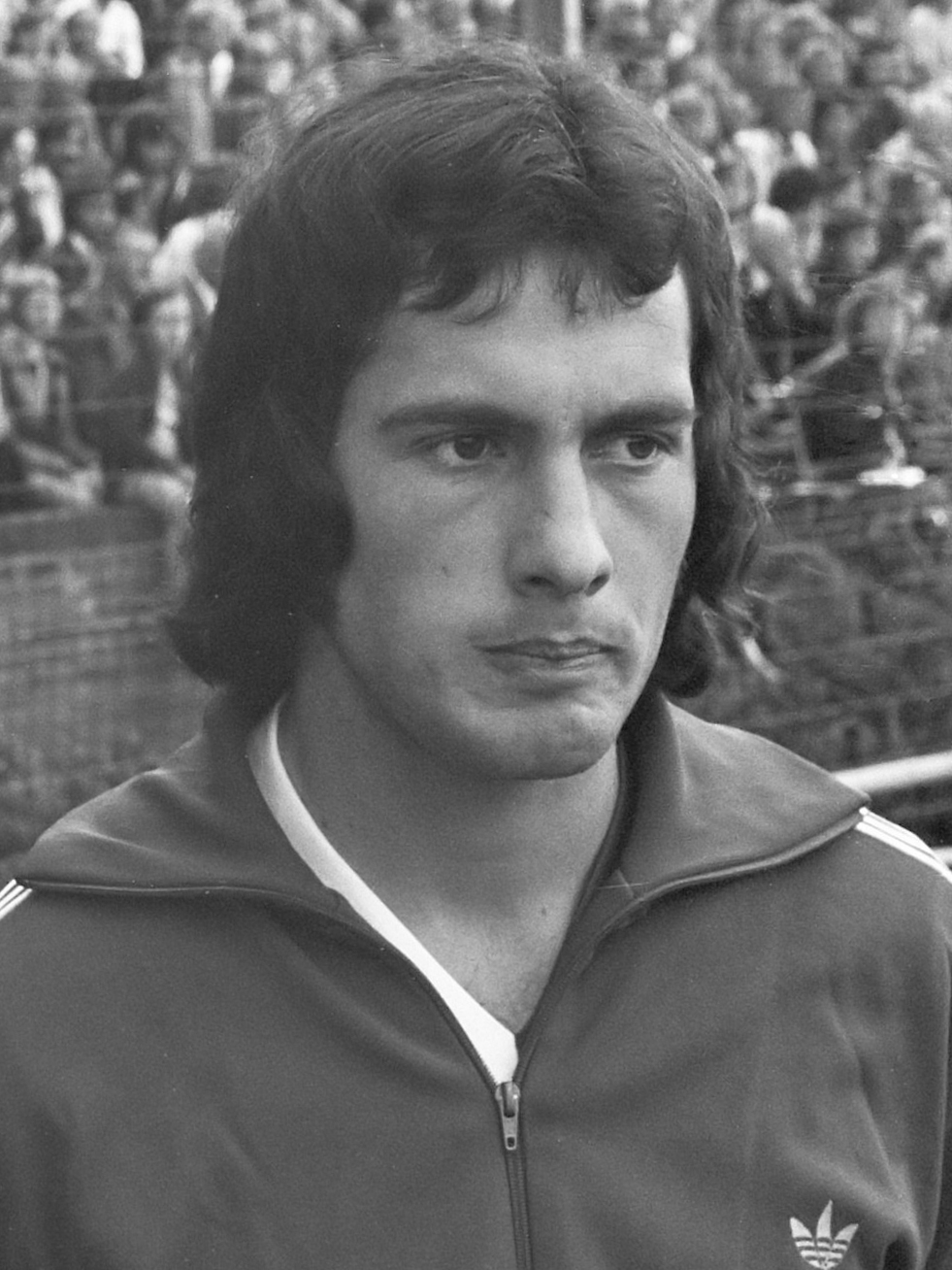
- Steve Wegerle (1975)

Personal information
- Date of birth: 15 May 1953 (age 73)
- Place of birth: Pretoria, South Africa
- Position: Winger

Youth career
- Leyland Motors

Senior career*
Years	Team	Apps	(Gls)
1968–1970	Arcadia United		
1970–1971	Leyland Motors		
1971–1974	Arcadia Shepherds		
1975	Coventry City	0	(0)
1975–1976	Feyenoord	5	(1)
1976	Arcadia Shepherds		
1977–1981	Tampa Bay Rowdies	138	(32)
1979–1980	Tampa Bay Rowdies (indoor)	5	(5)
1981–1982	New York Cosmos	35	(5)
1981–1982	New York Cosmos (indoor)	18	(7)
1983	Fort Lauderdale Strikers (indoor)	8	(7)
1983	Fort Lauderdale Strikers	19	(0)
1983–1984	Tampa Bay Rowdies (indoor)	25	(5)
1984	Tampa Bay Rowdies	23	(3)
1984–1986	Wichita Wings (indoor)	57	(16)
1986–1987	Tampa Bay Rowdies (indoor)	35	(26)
1988–1990	Tampa Bay Rowdies		

International career
	South Africa	5	(?)
- * Club domestic league appearances and goals

Steve Wegerle (born 15 May 1953) is a South African former professional soccer player who played as a winger.

== Early life ==
Wegerle was born in Pretoria.

== Playing career ==
He was voted Player of the Year in South Africa in 1974. He then joined Coventry City in 1975, but made no first team appearances. Steve Wegerle played 5 times for Feyenoord Rotterdam in 1975–76, finishing 2nd with Feyenoord in the Dutch competition, with 88 goals for and 40 goals against. His brother Geoffrey also played for Feyenoord Rotterdam in that 1975/1976 season. After June 1976, Steve Wegerle starred for the Tampa Bay Rowdies of the North American Soccer League for five seasons from 1977 to 1981. While with the Rowdies, Wegerle played in Soccer Bowl '78 and Soccer Bowl '79 (both defeats), as well as the 1979–80 NASL indoor finals, which Tampa Bay won. He joined the New York Cosmos during the 1981 season at age 28. He played in Soccer Bowl '81 and '82 with the Cosmos, winning the latter. Wegerle played 1983 with the Fort Lauderdale Strikers before returning in 1984 to finish his NASL career with the Rowdies. Wegerle's 152 points in 196 career games ranks him as the league's 27th all-time leading scoring. His 88 assists rank him 4th in that category.

Wegerle played for the Rowdies during the 1986–1987 American Indoor Soccer Association season. He later played for the team in the American Soccer League in 1988 and 1989 and then in the American Professional Soccer League in 1990.

== Personal life ==
Wegerle is the father of Bryce Wegerle. His brother Roy Wegerle is a former American international and MLS star, while his brother Geoff Wegerle played in the NASL for the 1978 season with Oakland and 1983 with Toronto. Steve and Roy were on the Rowdies together in 1984. Steve and Geoff played together on the post-NASL Rowdies from 1986 to 1988. Steve's mother is Scottish and his father is German.
