= Perry Van der Beck =

American soccer player (born 1959)

Personal information
- Date of birth: November 5, 1959 (age 66)
- Place of birth: Florissant, Missouri, United States
- Height: 6 ft 0 in (1.83 m)
- Position: Midfielder

Senior career*
Years	Team	Apps	(Gls)
1978–1982	Tampa Bay Rowdies	73	(5)
1979–1984	Tampa Bay Rowdies (indoor)	46	(20)
1983	Team America	28	(1)
1984	Tampa Bay Rowdies	24	(5)
1984–1987	Dallas Sidekicks (indoor)	57	(15)
1987–1988	St. Louis Steamers (indoor)	47	(7)
1988–1992	Wichita Wings (indoor)	173	(58)
1989–1993	Tampa Bay Rowdies	82	(9)
1995–1997	Tampa Bay Terror (indoor)	36	(6)
1997	St. Louis Ambush (indoor)	5	(1)
Total		571	(127)

International career
1979–1985	United States	23	(2)

Managerial career
- 1996–1997: Tampa Bay Terror
- 1998–2001: Tampa Bay Mutiny (assistant)
- 2001: Tampa Bay Mutiny
- 2010: Tampa Bay Rowdies (interim)
- * Club domestic league appearances and goals

Perry Van der Beck (born November 5, 1959, in Florissant, Missouri) is an American former soccer player, former coach and technical director, and the former Vice President of Competition and Operations for the United Soccer League.

Van der Beck began his playing career with the Tampa Bay Rowdies of the original North American Soccer League and ended it with the St. Louis Ambush of the indoor National Professional Soccer League. He also earned twenty-three caps, scoring two goals, with the U.S. national team between 1979 and 1985. He played for various indoor and outdoor teams until 1998, when he retired from the pitch and became an assistant coach with the Tampa Bay Mutiny.

After coaching for several other clubs and youth soccer organizations, Van der Beck was hired as the technical director and youth director for the new Tampa Bay Rowdies in 2008. He was later promoted to be the club's executive vice president and director of player development. In January 2014 he was again promoted to the position of general manager. Following the hiring of former teammate Farrukh Quraishi as president and general manager, Van der Beck returned to his role as the team's technical director.

== NASL ==
In 1978, the Tampa Bay Rowdies of the North American Soccer League (NASL) drafted Perry Van der Beck out of St. Thomas Aquinas High School in Florissant, Missouri. At the time he was the youngest native born American playing professional soccer. He was also the first American ever drafted out of high school. Despite his youth and relative inexperience when he joined the Rowdies, he gradually worked himself into becoming a significant contributor to the team. At the time, the Rowdies were a top-tier team in the NASL. In both 1978 and 1979, they made it to the Soccer Bowl championship game.

In 1983, Van der Beck played with Team America during its dismal single season. USSF wanted to combine all the dominant U.S. players in NASL onto one team to give them an opportunity to develop, as well as to create publicity for the national team. While the concept attracted the support of Van der Beck and some other U.S. players, it was viewed with suspicion by many others, such as Rick Davis. Team America went 10–20 and folded after the 1983 season. Van der Beck then returned to the Rowdies for a single season.

During his time with the Rowdies, the NASL had played both an indoor as well as its more well known outdoor seasons. He was member of the Rowdies' 1979–80 NASL indoor championship team as well as their 1981–82 indoor runner-up squad. However, the NASL was at heart an outdoor league and when the Major Indoor Soccer League (MISL) began operation, it quickly took over the indoor soccer market. By the time Van der Beck had returned to the Rowdies in 1984, the NASL was on its last legs and in 1985, Van Der Beck left the team to follow former Rowdies coach Gordon Jago to the Dallas Sidekicks of the MISL.

== MISL ==
Van der Beck remained with the Sidekicks for three seasons, capping his time with the team by winning the MISL championship in 1987. On July 4, 1987, the Sidekicks announced they would not renew Van der Beck's contract and he became a free agent. On August 11, 1987, he signed with the St. Louis Steamers. He then moved, sometime later, to the Wichita Wings.

== National team ==
In 1979, Van der Beck played his first game with the U.S. national team. He would go on to earn 23 caps, scoring two goals with the team. He was an integral part in the U.S. failed attempts to qualify for the 1982 and 1986 FIFA World Cups.

In 1979, he was a member of the U.S. soccer team at the 1979 Pan American Games. In 1980, he would have been the captain of the U.S. soccer team at the 1980 Summer Olympics. Despite qualifying for the tournament, the U.S. did not send a team to Moscow when President Jimmy Carter organized a boycott of the games in response to the Soviet invasion of Afghanistan.

In 1985, Van der Beck was selected the U.S. Soccer Athlete of the Year.

Van der Beck served on the US Soccer Board of Directors from 1986 to 1993.

In 2011, Van der Beck was inducted into the St. Louis Soccer Hall of Fame.

Van der Beck has owned and operated the original Camp Kikinthagrass since 2003.

== NPSL ==
He served as the player/coach with the Tampa Bay Terror of the National Professional Soccer League during the 1996–97 season.

== Coaching and front office ==
At the end of the 1997 season, he retired from playing and joined the Tampa Bay Mutiny of Major League Soccer (MLS) as an assistant coach for the 1998 season. In 2001, he became the head coach of the Mutiny for its last 11 games of the team's existence when then head coach, Alfonso Mondelo was fired. While assistant coach of the Mutiny, he also coached the Northdale Rangers of the Florida Youth Soccer Association to three State Cups and the 1998 Region III Cup. After MLS shut down the Mutiny at the end of the 2001 season, Van Der Beck replaced Peter Vermes as the Super Y-League Olympic Development Program National Camp Technical Director. He also spent one season as a staff coach with the Adidas Elite Soccer Program, which identifies the nation's best high school players and coaches them in weeklong training programs.

=== Tampa Bay Rowdies ===
In June 2008, Van der Beck was hired as the technical director of the expansion FC Tampa Bay of the USL First Division . By the time the team took the pitch in 2010, the team switched to the USSF Division 2 Professional League and Van der Beck had been promoted to executive vice president and director of player development. Head coach Paul Dalglish left the team with 2 games remaining in the regular season, and Van der Beck served as the interim coach until January 2011, when Ricky Hill was hired as the club's new head coach and Van der Beck returned to his executive position. In January 2014 he was promoted from the position of technical director to the club's general manager. With the November 18, 2014, hiring of Quraishi as team president and general manager, Van der Beck re-assumed the role of technical director. In May 2016 Van der Beck resigned as the Tampa Bay Rowdies’ assistant general manager and vice president of community relations.

=== USL vice president ===
On June 23, 2016, the United Soccer League announced that Van der Beck would be the new Vice President of Competition and Operations, replacing David Wagner. In his new role he is responsible for the day-to-day league operations, competition, schedule, discipline and refereeing.
