= Bayfront Center =

Arena in Florida, United States

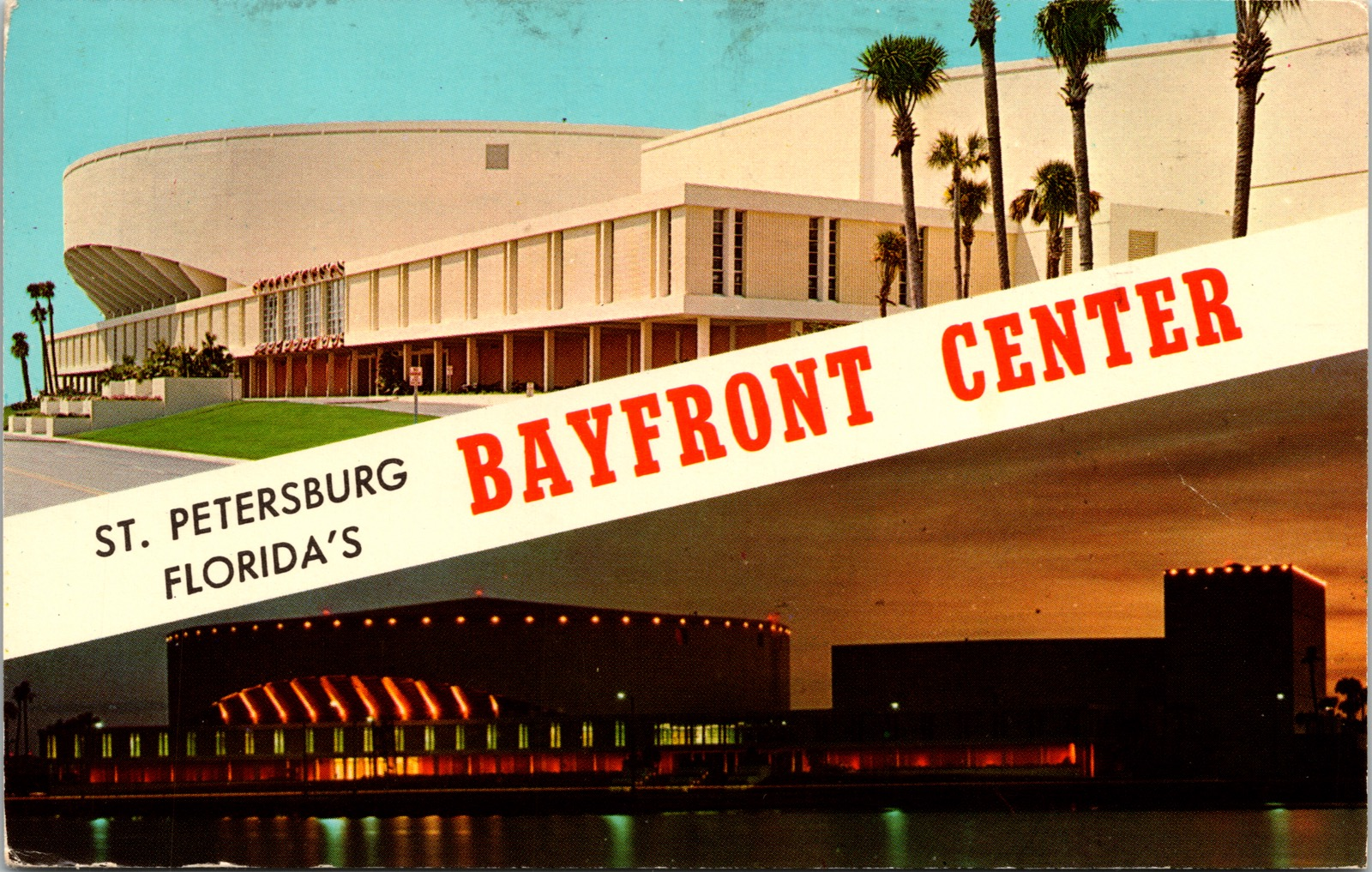
- 1960s postcard
- Interactive map of Bayfront Center
- Address: 400 First Street South
- Location: St. Petersburg, Florida
- Coordinates: 27°45′59.7″N 82°37′54.1″W
- Owner: City of St. Petersburg
- Capacity: Concerts: 8,600; Indoor soccer: 6,410; Ice hockey: 5,800

Construction
- Groundbreaking: September 19, 1963
- Opened: May 1, 1965
- Demolished: December 1, 2004
- Cost: $5 million

Tenants
- The Floridians (ABA) (1970–1972); Suncoast Suns (EHL/SHL) (1971–1973); Tampa Bay Rowdies (NASL/AISA) (1975–1984, 1986–1987); Tampa Bay Thrillers (CBA) (1984–1985, 1986–1987); Tampa Bay Terror (NPSL) (1995–1997); Tampa Bay ThunderDawgs (ABA) (2000–2001)

Bayfront Center was an indoor arena located in St. Petersburg, Florida that hosted many concerts, sporting and other events. Depending on the configuration, it could hold up to 8,600 people. The arena was opened in 1965 and demolished in 2004. It adjoined the Mahaffey Theater, which is still standing.

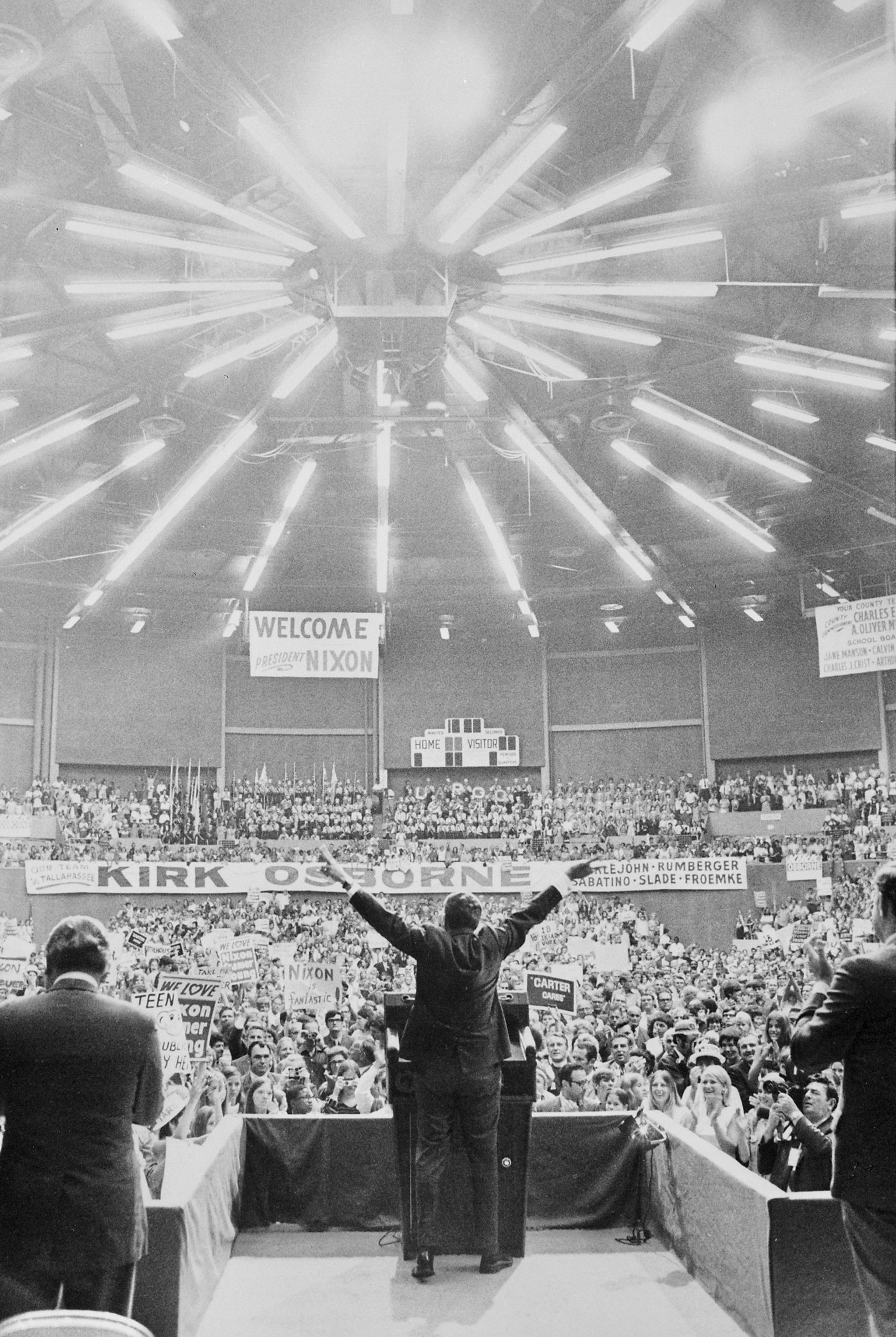
President Richard Nixon in Bayfront Center Arena in 1970

== Musical acts ==
Over its 40-year history, a wide variety of top entertainers performed at the Bayfront Center including: Elvis Presley, Iron Maiden, Metallica, Lynyrd Skynyrd, B.B. King, Van Halen, Bruce Springsteen, Frank Sinatra, Aerosmith, the Beach Boys, James Brown, the Grateful Dead, Elton John, RUSH, The Police, Billy Joel, Johnny Cash, the Beastie Boys, Liberace, Bon Jovi, Jimmy Buffett, Ray Charles, Bob Dylan, KISS, The Smiths, Supertramp and The Who.

== Sports ==
=== Basketball ===
The venue hosted the American Basketball Association's The Floridians when the team played in St. Petersburg during the 1970–71 and 1971–72 seasons.

The South Florida Bulls men's basketball team used the Bayfront Center for some home games between 1974 and 1980.

The Tampa Bay Thrillers of the Continental Basketball Association played two non-consecutive seasons (1984–85 and 1986–87) in the arena, winning the CBA title in 1985. Because of an apparent rent/lease dispute they moved to Tampa the following year and won another title. With a new owner at the helm they returned to the Bayfront Center for their third season. Attendance sagged to as few as 295 fans, so the franchise relocated to Rapid City, South Dakota at the end of that regular season, and won that year's CBA title for an unusual three-peat. The arena served as the home arena of the Tampa Bay ThunderDawgs of the ABA for the 2000-2001 season.

=== Ice hockey ===
The Bayfront Center was home ice for the St. Petersburg Suns of the Eastern Hockey League from 1971 to 1973, and then for the Suncoast Suns of the Southern Hockey League for the 1973–74 season.

=== Indoor soccer ===
The Tampa Bay Rowdies of the North American Soccer League played nearly all of their indoor home games at the Bayfront Center throughout their NASL existence, winning titles in 1976, 1979–80 and 1983. The Rowdies later joined American Indoor Soccer Association and again used the arena for the AISA 1986–87 season.

The Tampa Bay Terror of the National Professional Soccer League also used the venue in the 1995–96 and 1996–97 seasons.

== Other events ==
From the 1960s to the 1990s, the Bayfront Center was the location for Ringling Brothers & Barnum and Bailey's annual spring TV taping. Until 1992, every spring Ringling Brothers taped a network TV special from the arena and also shot all the photos for their programs there.

The Pinellas County Industrial and Aerospace Exhibition, featuring several of NASA's Apollo program displays, was held at the venue from 1968 to 1971.

The arena also hosted many professional wrestling events, including being a primary venue for Championship Wrestling from Florida in the 60s, 70s, and 80s. It also hosted the WCW's SuperBrawl I and VI, and Slamboree (1995). Other groups, such as Jehovah's Witnesses, held annual conventions featuring Bible discourses, which were free of charge.

Additionally, the Bayfront Center was the location for most of Pinellas County high school commencement ceremonies.

== Demise ==
The Bayfront Center was finally imploded in 2004 to make way for an eventual replacement facility for the nearby Salvador Dalí Museum.
