= Winston DuBose =

American soccer player

Personal information
- Date of birth: July 28, 1955 (age 71)
- Place of birth: Orlando, Florida, United States
- Position: Goalkeeper

College career
Years	Team	Apps	(Gls)
1973–1977	Florida Technical University (UCF)		

Senior career*
Years	Team	Apps	(Gls)
1977–1982	Tampa Bay Rowdies	90	(0)
1979–1982	Tampa Bay Rowdies (indoor)	22	(0)
1982–1985	Tulsa Roughnecks	93+	(0)
1983–1984	Tulsa Roughnecks (indoor)	25	(0)
1985–1988	Tampa Bay Rowdies	?	(0)
1988–1989	Oldham Athletic	1	(0)
1988–1991	Tampa Bay Rowdies	82	(0)

International career
1979–1985	United States	14	(0)
- * Club domestic league appearances and goals

Winston DuBose is an American former soccer goalkeeper who spent eight seasons in the North American Soccer League, four in the American Professional Soccer League and one in the American Indoor Soccer Association. He also earned fourteen caps with the United States men's national soccer team. He spent a season at Oldham Athletic in 1988-89, making just one appearance in the League Cup v Darlington.

== Youth and college ==
Born in Orlando, Florida, DuBose attended Trinity Preparatory School in Winter Park, Florida. After graduating from high school, he played collegiate soccer at Florida Technological University, now known as the University of Central Florida, from 1973 to 1976 where he earned All-American honors. He was inducted in the school's athletic Hall of Fame in 2000.

== United States ==
DuBose began his professional career in 1977 with the Tampa Bay Rowdies of the North American Soccer League. He helped the Rowdies to an appearance in Soccer Bowl '78, where they fell to the Cosmos. In 1982, the Rowdies traded DuBose to the Tulsa Roughnecks where he won the 1983 NASL championship. At the end of the 1984 season, the Roughnecks announced that they were folding, and the rest of the NASL collapsed the following spring before the 1985 outdoor season could begin. Left with few professional options, DuBose joined a revived version of the Roughnecks that gamely attempted to play a 20-game schedule as an independent team in the summer of 1985 but closed up shop about halfway through that schedule. He then found his way back to the Rowdies, who were also operating as an independent club playing exhibition games and invitational tournaments. In 1986, the Rowdies entered the American Indoor Soccer Association for a single season before spending the 1985–1988 season as an independent team. In 1988, a new, east-coast-based league came into existence. The Rowdies entered the league, known as the American Soccer League for its first season. DuBose showed his class when he led the league with a 0.75 goals-against average. At the end of the season, he moved to England where he spent several months with the Second Division, now Championship, Oldham Athletic. On October 6, 1988, he signed a one-year contract with Oldham's first team. In 1989, he returned to the U.S. to rejoin the Rowdies. In 1990, the ASL merged with the west coast based Western Soccer League to form the American Professional Soccer League (APSL). DuBose continued to play for the Rowdies in the APSL until he retired following the 1991 season. During his years in the ASL, he was an All-Star in both 1988 and 1989.

== Europe ==
DuBose first went to Europe in 1977. He spent six months during the winter of 1977–1978 playing with the Southampton F.C. reserves. He returned to Southampton F.C. in the fall of 1978 to January 1979. From December 1979 to February 1980, he spent three months at Ipswich Town F.C. Played 5 games in the reserves. While in England he also gained experience playing for Cambridge City in the Southern League. He played over 30 games for Cambridge City in two seasons.

He was unable to get a work permit again until 1988, when he moved to Oldham Athletic at the behest of then-manager Rodney Marsh, with whom he had played in Tampa Bay. He later said, "It was unheard of then. Being there was the right fit for me, but I was 34 years old. I would have loved to have gone there back in 1979, not in 1988, but it was the perfect storm, just to even get me there then. People helped me out and cashed in favors." "Favors" in that context refers to people who advocated to grant the work permit to DuBose; without their help, chances are he would have been denied the work permit.

When DuBose was trying his hand at European soccer in 1989, he was one of only a handful of American pioneers then playing professionally on the continent: only Chris Sullivan (Le Touquet AC), Frank Klopas (AEK Athens), Paul Caligiuri (Meppen), Bruce Murray (FC Lucerne), and Peter Vermes (Raba Eto) were also eking out a living there at the time.

== National team ==
Sporadically throughout his professional career, DuBose also manned the nets for the U.S. national team. His first cap came as a second-half substitute against Bermuda on October 7, 1979. He gained his first start for his country against Ireland three weeks later. His first shutout came against Luxembourg, in 1980. He cites playing against Mexico in front of over 100,000 people at the Azteca as his greatest footballing memory, though the U.S. lost the match, 5–1. He played his final game for the national team in 1985.

== Post soccer career ==
DuBose now runs a computer business in Florida with his former Rowdies teammate Peter Anderson. He also worked part-time as a commentator for home games of the Tampa Bay Mutiny of Major League Soccer until the team's closure after the 2001 season. As recently as 2010, DuBose served as the color radio analyst for the Tampa Bay Rowdies of the new NASL.

He has coached and mentored youth teams for over 20 years, currently developing the next generation of U.S. keepers at FC Tampa Rangers.

== Honors ==
Tulsa Roughnecks

- NASL Soccer Bowl Championships: 1983
- NASL Southern Division Championships: 1983

Tampa Bay Rowdies

- NASL American Conference Champion: 1978

Individual

- American Soccer League All-Star: 1988, 1989
