= Tampa Bay Rowdies (1975–1993) =

Defunct American soccer club

- Full name: Tampa Bay Rowdies
- Nickname: Rowdies
- Founded: June 19, 1974
- Dissolved: January 31, 1994; 32 years ago
- Stadium: Outdoor: Tampa Stadium (71,000); USF Soccer Stadium (4,000); Indoor: Bayfront Center (6,410); Expo Hall (9,200); Lakeland Civic Center (8,178)
- Owner(s): George W. Strawbridge, Jr. (1974–1983); Stella Thayer, Bob Blanchard & Dick Corbett (1983–1986); Cornelia Corbett (1986–1994)
- Chairman: Beau Rogers, IV; Chas Serednesky, Jr
- Coach: Eddie Firmani (1975–1977); John Boyle (1977); Gordon Jago (1978–1982); Al Miller (1982–83); Rodney Marsh (1984)
- League: North American Soccer League (1975–1984); American Indoor Soccer Association (1986–1987); American Soccer League (1988–1989); American Professional Soccer League (1990–1993)
Home colors	Away colors

The Tampa Bay Rowdies were an American professional soccer team based in Tampa, Florida, that competed in the original North American Soccer League (NASL) from 1975 to 1984. They enjoyed popular support in the Tampa Bay area until the NASL folded in 1984, after which the team played in various minor indoor and outdoor leagues before finally folding on January 31, 1994. The Rowdies played nearly all of their outdoor home games at Tampa Stadium and nearly all of their indoor games at the Bayfront Center Arena in nearby St. Petersburg, Florida. Although San Diego played indoors until 1996, the Rowdies were the last surviving NASL franchise that played outdoor soccer on a regular basis.

== NASL: 1975–1984 ==
On June 19, 1974 George Strawbridge and Beau Rogers, IV purchased an expansion franchise in North American Soccer League for the sum of $25,000 and by July 24 they named Eddie Firmani their coach. In October 1974, Alex Pringle became the first player to sign with the team. On November 21, 1974, the Tampa Bay Professional Soccer Club announced that it would henceforth be known as the Tampa Bay Rowdies. The Rowdies played ten seasons at Tampa Stadium and won their only Soccer Bowl championship in their 1975 inaugural season, defeating the Portland Timbers 2–0 on August 24. The Rowdies also finished as runners-up in 1978 and 1979. The team showcased international stars such as midfielder and team captain Rodney Marsh (England), 1979 league scoring leader Óscar Fabbiani (Chile), swift and forward Steve Wegerle (South Africa), rock-solid defenseman Arsene Auguste (Haiti), 1976 NASL goal scoring champion Derek Smethurst (South Africa), who was also the franchise's all-time leading goal scorer with 57 tallies in 65 games, and forward Clyde Best (Bermuda). Coached along the way by Firmani, John Boyle, Gordon Jago, Al Miller, and Marsh after his retirement, their catch phrase and marketing slogan was "The Rowdies arrrre...a kick in the grass!"

While no NASL team captured a treble, in 1975–76 Tampa Bay came the closest by successively winning the three different NASL titles then available (Soccer Bowl '75, 1976 Indoor Title, 1976 Regular Season title) within twelve months. On and off the pitch, the Rowdies proved to be one of the league's most recognizable brands. At one three-year point in their history, the team regularly drew crowds of well over 25,000 spectators per night. In 1979, three matches were attended by over 40,000 people, and the following year two more surpassed the 50,000 mark. The Rowdies had long-standing rivalries with both the Ft. Lauderdale Strikers and the New York Cosmos.

Following the 1981 season the Dallas Tornado merged with Tampa Bay. At the time, Dallas principals Lamar Hunt and Bill McNutt retained a minority stake in the Rowdies. Two years later after the 1983 season, Strawbidge, Hunt and McNutt sold the team outright to local investors Stella Thayer, Bob Blanchard and Dick Corbett.

=== Year-by-year ===
Year	Record	Regular season finish	Playoffs	Leading goal scorers	Avg. attend.
1975	16–6	1st, Eastern Division	NASL Champions (3-0)	Derek Smethurst-18, Stewart Scullion-7	10,728
1976	18–6	1st, Eastern Division, Atlantic Conference	Atlantic Conf. Championship (1-1)	Derek Smethurst-20, Rodney Marsh-11, Stewart Scullion-10	16,452
1977	14–12	3rd, Eastern Division, Atlantic Conference	Divisional Playoffs (0-1)	Derek Smethurst-19, Rodney Marsh-8, David Robb-8	19,491
1978	18–12	1st, Eastern Division, American Conference	Runners-up (4-3)	Rodney Marsh-18, David Robb-16, Steve Wegerle-7	18,123
1979	19–11	1st, Eastern Division, American Conference	Runners-up (6-2)	Óscar Fabbiani-25, Rodney Marsh-11, Petar Baralić-9	27,650
1980	19–13	1st, Eastern Division, American Conference	American Conf. Semifinals (3-2)	Oscar Fabbiani-13, Neill Roberts-10, Steve Wegerle-9	28,345
1981	15–17	4th, Southern Division	Quarterfinals (3-2)	Frank Worthington-11, Luís Fernando-9, David Moss-9	22,299
1982	12–20	3rd, Southern Division	Did not qualify	Luís Fernando-16, Tatu-7	22,532
1983	7–23	3rd, Southern Division	Did not qualify	Tatu-12, Manny Rojas-8	18,507
1984	9–15	4th, Eastern Division	Did not qualify	Roy Wegerle-9, Neill Roberts-9, Wes McLeod-7	10,932

==== Home attendance records ====
Year	Attendance	Opponent
1980	56,389	California
1980	54,247	New York
1981	48,355	San Diego
1979	45,888	Rochester
1977	45,288	Cosmos
1976	42,611	New York
1978	41,888	Cosmos
1977	41,680	Zenit Leningrad
1979	41,102	Ft. Lauderdale
1979	40,701	New York
1980	40,368	Ft. Lauderdale
1982	40,098	Jacksonville
1979	38,766	San Diego*
1978	37,249	Ft. Lauderdale*

*playoff game

==== NASL Indoor Soccer ====
In the winter of 1975, the NASL conducted a two-tiered, 16-team indoor tournament with four regional winners meeting in a "final-four" style championship. The Rowdies defeated the New York Cosmos 13–5 in the semi-final, before losing 8–5 to the host San Jose Earthquakes in the finals on March 16 at the Cow Palace. The Rowdies again reached the final-four in 1976. This time Tampa Bay, the host team, would not be denied, as they followed up a 6–2 semi-final win over Dallas with a 6–4 finals triumph over the Rochester Lancers on March 27 in the Bayfront Center. Over the next few years, the Rowdies (and a handful of other NASL teams) played indoor friendlies and invitationals to prepare for the start of the outdoor season. The NASL did not sanction a full indoor season until 1979–80, when the Rowdies won the championship by defeating the Memphis Rogues 2 games to 1. The 1980–81 campaign marked the first time Tampa Bay missed the playoffs, indoor or outdoor. In the 1981–82 season they lost the finals to the San Diego Sockers 2 games to 0. Once again the NASL chose not to sanction a full indoor season in 1982–83, but (in addition to a few friendlies) Tampa Bay and three other teams participated in the Grand Prix of Indoor Soccer. The Rowdies finished second in the round-robin stage and went on to defeat Montreal for the championship in a double overtime thriller at the Montreal Forum; 5–4. The final NASL indoor season took place in 1983–84 and the Rowdies finished last out of the seven teams. Due to scheduling issues that season, the Rowdies played five games at the Bayfront Center, eight at the State Fairgrounds' Expo Hall in Tampa, and three in the Lakeland Civic Center. Tampa Bay regularly drew home crowds of over five thousand "fannies" to the Bayfront Center, despite the arena's limited seating capacity and relatively remote location.

Indoor year	Record	Regular season finish	Playoffs	Leading goal scorers	Avg. attend.
1975	3–1	1st, Region 3 (2–0)	Runners-up (1–1)	Doug Wark-10, Cantillo-5, Hartze-4	4,235
1976	5–0	1st, Eastern Region (2–0)	NASL Champions (2–0)	Clyde Best-11, Scullion-6, Smethurst-4, Marsh-4	5,458
1977	1–1	(friendlies only)	none	Derek Smethurst-5, Marsh-4, S. Wegerle-3	5,685
1978	6–2	(friendlies only)	none	Smethurst-14, Fink-10 Marsh-9, McLeod-8	5,901
1979	3–2	2nd, Budweiser Invitational (2–0)	Invitational Runners-up	Mirandinha-5, S. Wegerle-5, Marsh-4	6,181
1979–80	8–4	2nd, Eastern Division	NASL Champions (5–1)	Peter Baralić-21, McLeod-13, P. Anderson-7	5,712
1980–81	9–9	2nd, Eastern Division	did not qualify	Óscar Fabbiani-31, S. Wegerle-25, McLeod-21	5,175
1981–82	11–7	2nd, Cent. Division, American Conf.	Runners-up (4–4)	Tatu-21, Zequinha-19, McLeod-15, Pesa-15	5,372
1983	10–2	2nd, in Grand Prix preliminaries (4–2)	Grand Prix Champions (2–0)	Hugo Pérez-12, Tatu-12, Karpun-11, McLeod-8	4,771
1983–84	9–23	7th	did not qualify	Tatu-49, Peter Roe-22, Van der Beck-18	2,334

==== Indoor home attendance records ====
Year	Attendance	Opponent
1978	6,410	Washington
1978	6,410	Minnesota
1978	6,399	Dallas
1978	6,384	Tulsa
1977	6,354	Zenit Leningrad
1979	6,342	Fort Lauderdale
1979	6,338	Tulsa
1982	6,325	San Diego*
1980	6,243	Fort Lauderdale
1980	6,200	New England
1980	6,145	Detroit
1980	6,141	Atlanta*
1979	6,040	Dynamo Moscow
1979	6,002	Houston

*playoff game

=== Players, coaches, and honors – NASL era ===
==== Honors ====
NASL championships (1)
- 1975
- runner-up: 1978, 1979

NASL Indoor championships (3)

- 1976, 1979–80, 1983
- runner-up: 1975, 1979, 1981–82

Regular Season Premiership (1)

- 1976 (18–6 -154 points)
- runner-up: 1975

Division titles (6)

- 1975 Eastern Division
- 1976 Eastern Division, Atlantic Conference
- 1978 Eastern Division, American Conference
- 1979 Eastern Division, American Conference
- 1980 Eastern Division, American Conference
- 1979–80 Eastern Division Playoffs (indoor)

Conference Titles (3)

- 1978 American Conference
- 1979 American Conference
- 1981–82 Atlantic Conference (indoor)

Regional Titles (2)

- 1975 Indoor Region 3
- 1976 Indoor East Region

League scoring champion

- 1979 Óscar Fabbiani (25 goals, 8 assists, 58 points)

League goal scoring champion

- 1976 Derek Smethurst (20 goals)

Indoor Grand Prix Assists Leader

- 1983 Wes McLeod (13 assists)

Finals MVP

- 1975 Stewart Jump
- 1976 Clyde Best (indoor)
- 1979–80 ???? (indoor)

Regionals MVP

- 1975 Ringo Cantillo (indoor)
- 1976 Stewart Scullion (indoor)

Coach of the Year

- 1976 Eddie Firmani

Rookie of the Year

- 1982 Pedro DeBrito
- 1983 Gregg Thompson
- 1984 Roy Wegerle

North American Player of the Year

- 1976 Arnie Mausser

FIFA World Cup players

- (Australia) Adrian Alston (1974)
- (Argentina) Carlos Babington (1974)
- (Brazil) Clodoaldo (1970)
- (Brazil) Antônio Lima dos Santos (1966)
- (Brazil) Mirandinha (1974)
- (Canada) Terry Moore (1986) did not play
- (Chile) Eduardo Bonvallet (1982)
- (Chile) Manny Rojas (1982)
- (Haiti) Arsène Auguste (1974)
- (United States) Hugo Pérez (1994)
- (United States) Roy Wegerle (1994, 1998)
NASL All-time Leaders
- Consecutive regular season starts: Mike Connell (179)
- Career games by a US-born player: Arnie Mausser (224)

All-Star first team selections

- 1975 Farrukh Quraishi
- 1976 Rodney Marsh, Arnie Mausser, Tommy Smith
- 1977 Derek Smethurst
- 1978 Rodney Marsh
- 1979 Mike Connell
- 1980 Mike Connell
- 1981 John Gorman
- 1982 Peter Nogly

All-Star second team selections

- 1975 John Boyle, Stewart Jump, Stewart Scullion
- 1976 Stewart Jump, Stewart Scullion, Derek Smethurst
- 1977 Arsène Auguste, Rodney Marsh, Steve Wegerle
- 1978 Arsène Auguste, Steve Wegerle
- 1979 Óscar Fabbiani, John Gorman
- 1980 Steve Wegerle

All-Star honorable mentions

- 1975 Clyde Best, John Sissons, Derek Smethurst
- 1979 Rodney Marsh, Steve Wegerle
- 1980 John Gorman
- 1982 Mike Connell
- 1983 Gregg Thompson
- 1984 Gregg Thompson

Indoor All-Stars

- 1975 Doug Wark (All-Tournament Team)
- 1976 Clyde Best (All-Tournament Team)
- 1976 Derek Smethurst (All-Tournament Team)
- 1976 Stewart Scullion (All-Tournament Team)
- 1976 Arsène Auguste (All-Eastern Regional Team)
- 1976 Rodney Marsh (All-Eastern Regional Team)
- 1976 Stewart Scullion (All-Eastern Regional Team)
- 1980–81 Steve Wegerle (All-East Team)
- 1981–82 Tatu (Atlantic)
- 1981–82 Mike Connell (Atlantic)
- 1981–82 Jürgen Stars (Atlantic)
- 1981–82 John Gorman (2nd team)
- 1983–84 Frantz Mathieu (reserve)
- 1983–84 Mike Connell (reserve)

U.S. Soccer Hall of Fame members

- 1992 Lamar Hunt (owner/executive)
- 1995 Al Miller
- 2003 Arnie Mausser
- 2008 Hugo Pérez
- 2015 Glenn Myernick
- 2024 Francisco Marcos (executive)

Canadian Soccer Hall of Fame members

- 2004 Bob Bolitho
- 2005 Wes McLeod
- 2005 Terry Moore
- 2008 Jack Brand

Indoor Soccer Hall of Fame members

- 2012 Tatu
- 2013 Gordon Jago

Other National Halls of Fame

- 2000 Adrian Alston (Australia)

==== Head coaches ====
Coach	Tenure	League	Cup^	Indoor	Indoor Cup^	Totals*
(Italy) Eddie Firmani	1977–1984	41–15	3–1	4–0	3–1	51–17
(England) Lenny Glover (interim)	1977	0–1	–	–	–	0–1
(Scotland) John Boyle	1977	7–8	0–1	–	–	7–9
(England) Gordon Jago	1978–1982	81–56	17–9	28–20	11–5	137–90
(England) Kevin Keelan (interim)	1982	0–1	–	–	–	0–1
(United States) Al Miller	1982–1983	9–30	0–0	4–2	2–0	15–32
(England) Rodney Marsh	1983–1984	9–15	–	9–23	–	18–38

*Excludes friendlies. ^Cup includes playoff games and mini-games.

==== Team captains ====
Captain	Outdoor seasons	Indoor seasons
(Scotland) John Boyle	1975	1975
(South Africa) Derek Smethurst	-	1976
(England) Rodney Marsh	1976, 1978, 1979	1978, 1979
(England) Tommy Smith	1976	-
(Scotland) Alex Pringle	-	1977
(Scotland) Lenny Glover	1977	-
(Netherlands) Jan van der Veen	1978, 1981	1979–80, 1980–81
(South Africa) Mike Connell	1981, 1982, 1983, 1984	1981–82, 1983–84
(Canada) Wes McLeod	-	*1983

*due to Connell injury

==== Most appearances in club history ====
*Excludes friendlies and indoor matches. ^Includes playoff games.

Player	Total Apps*	League	Cup^	Tenure	Leagues
(South Africa) Mike Connell	277	252	25	1975, 1977–1984	NASL
(Canada) Wes McLeod	211	188	23	1977–1984	NASL
(South Africa) Steve Wegerle	210	188	22	1977–1981, 1984, 1988–1990	NASL, ASL, APSL
(United States) Perry Van der Beck	190	171	19	1978–1982, 1984, 1989–1993	NASL, ASL, APSL
(United States) Winston DuBose	165	147	18	1977–1982, 1988–1991	NASL, ASL, APSL
(Socialist Federal Republic of Yugoslavia) Refik Kozić	134	125	9	1980–1984	NASL
(Scotland) John Gorman	128	111	17	1979–1982	NASL
(England) Rodney Marsh	110	94	16	1976–1979	NASL
(South Africa) Derek Backman	100	90	10	1988–1993	ASL, APSL
(Netherlands) Jan van der Veen	94	84	10	1979–1981, 1983	NASL

==== Retired numbers ====
In a ceremony held before the final home game of the 1989 regular season, Steve Wegerle became the first Tampa Bay Rowdies player to have his number retired by the team. That night he assisted on all three Rowdies' goals in a 3–0 victory over arch-rival Fort Lauderdale. He went on to appear in several home matches during the 1990 season as well.

While Mike Connell's and Perry Van der Beck's numbers have since been retired by the current franchise, Wegerle's #7 continues to be reissued each season.

No.	Player	Position	Nation	Tenure	Date Retired	Ref
6	Mike Connell	Defender	South Africa	1975–1984	August 10, 2013	
7	Steve Wegerle (Note: Number reissued by the current Rowdies franchise, which did not acknowledge the retirement.)	Forward	South Africa	1977–1981, 1984, 1988–1990	July 22, 1989	
12	Perry Van der Beck	Midfielder	United States	1978–82, 1984, 1991–93	October 1, 2010	

=== Club culture ===
As part of a name-the-team contest, on November 21, 1974, the franchise announced that the name Tampa Bay Rowdies was selected. Of nearly 12,500 entries it was Clearwater attorney Bill Wilhelm's suggestion that won. That suggestion earned Wilhelm a vacation to Acapulco and a lifetime pass to all home games. The Rowdies' fans were known as "Fannies". Advertisements for the club declared that "Soccer is a kick in the grass" and encouraged their supporters to "Get up, get out, and get Rowdy!" and to "make a fanny of yourself!". The calls were answered by fans who threw confetti, drank beer, chanted during games, and generally "let the guys know we're behind them." One memorable fan, Bob Rogers, won a "Rowdiest Fan" contest by donning a giant soccer head and throwing himself into the Tampa Stadium goal. The club gave "Soccer Head" complimentary tickets to future games so that he could continue his antics for the crowd, even bringing him along when the Rowdies played in Soccer Bowl '79.

While anyone who supported the club could call themselves a Fanny, members of the official Rowdies Fan Club particularly claimed the moniker as their own. The fan club held regular meetings and social events and published a newsletter.

The "Wowdies" were the Rowdies' cheerleaders. The team also had a pep band known as the "Loudies" that sat in the south endzone and attended local pep rallies.

== Post-NASL: 1985–1993 ==
The NASL folded in 1984, but the Rowdies continued to play for several more years. They continued to use Tampa Stadium as their home ground for outdoor games except during the 1991 and 1992 seasons in the APSL. Those two years were spent at the USF Soccer Stadium, before returning to Tampa Stadium in 1993 for the team's final season in existence.

=== Independent: 1985–1987 ===
With Rodney Marsh staying on as coach (through 1987), the Rowdies operated as an independent team for two years before joining the American Indoor Soccer Association for one season (1986–87). Cornelia Corbett, Dick Corbett's wife and a businesswoman in her own right, became sole owner of the team in 1986. As a footnote, in 2011 the University of South Florida opened the new Corbett Soccer Stadium for their NCAA Division I men's and women's teams, after the Corbetts made a $1.5 million donation to the project. The stadium features several display cases highlighting the history of the Tampa Bay Rowdies. Since 2005, the USF Bulls and the crosstown rival University of Tampa Spartans men's squads have competed annually for the preseason Rowdies Cup, which celebrates the city's rich soccer history. To date the NCAA Division II Spartans have only captured the trophy once, back in 2012.

==== 1985 Outdoor ====
As an independent club, the Rowdies played only one match in 1985. It was against the U.S. Men's team on the Fourth of July in front of 30,038 fans.

==== 1986 Outdoor ====
In the summer of 1986 the Rowdies staged a four-game series at Tampa Stadium called the Coca-Cola Classic International Soccer Series, which culminated with a Fourth of July match, and also included a post-game fireworks display and laser light show. Since Tampa Bay had only a handful of players under contract at the time, their roster was composed mostly of guest players from Queens Park Rangers F.C. The only NASL-era Rowdies on this roster were Roy Wegerle, Steve Wegerle, Dave Power, and the head coach, Rodney Marsh. Four former Rowdies played in the final game of this series for the opposing NASL All-Stars. These included Mike Connell, Winston DuBose, Wes McLeod and Tatu.

They also played a pair of friendlies against the newly established Orlando Lions on February 22 and July 2 at Lake Brantley High School, using their regular players. Tampa Bay won the matches by scores of 1–0 and 2–1(SO) respectively.

==== 1987 Outdoor ====
In 1987 Tampa Bay played twice against the Orlando Lions, on May 16 at the Florida Citrus Bowl, and then again on May 23 at Pepin-Rood Stadium. The Rowdies lost the first encounter, 2–0, with the teams tying, 2–2, in the return leg.

==== 1985–87 Outdoor results ====
Date	Opponent	Venue	Result	Attendance	Goal Scorers	Ref.
July 4, 1985	USMNT	Tampa Stadium	1–2	30,038	Hoddle	
February 22, 1986	@Orlando Lions	Lake Brantley High School	0–1	4,200	G. Wegerle	
June 7, 1986	Glentoran F.C. (Northern Ireland)	Tampa Stadium	1–0	6,900	Chivers	
June 14, 1986	Dundee F.C. (Scotland)	Tampa Stadium	2–1(SO, 4–3)	2,787	R Wegerle	
June 21, 1986	Canada U-20	Tampa Stadium	0–1	4,010		
July 2, 1986	@Orlando Lions	Lake Brantley High School	1–2(SO, 2–3)		White	
July 4, 1986	NASL All-Stars	Tampa Stadium	3–4(SO, 5–6)	29,755	R Wegerle, James, Loram	
May 16, 1987	@Orlando Lions	Florida Citrus Bowl	2–0	2,060		
May 23, 1987	Orlando Lions	Pepin-Rood Stadium	2–2		Marsh, Astigarraga	

=== AISA: 1986–1987 ===
The Rowdies played one season of indoor soccer in the American Indoor Soccer Association, once again using the Bayfront Center as their home. After a strong start they finished third in their division and eventually lost in the first round of the playoffs. Steve Wegerle was selected as a starter in the AISA All-Star game and scored the game's first goal. Arnie Mausser, Rubén Astigarraga, and Glenn Ervine also made the Southern Division team. Ervine added a goal in the fourth quarter. Tim Walters was a late All-Star addition, because Astigarraga was unable play in the match.

==== Year-by-year ====
Year	League	Games	Won	Lost	GF	GA	Regular season	Playoffs	Attendance (21 games)
1986–87	AISA	42	21	21	170	172	3rd, Southern	Quarterfinals	43,015 (avg. 2,048)

==== 1986–1987 roster ====
- 1 – (United States) Arnie Mausser 35 Apps 0 Goals
- 2 – (Haiti) Arsène Auguste
- 3 – (United States) David Dodge
- 4 – (United States) Dave Power
- 5 – (United States) Steve Savage
- 5 – (Netherlands) Wim Suurbier (player/asst. coach)
- 6 – (Canada) Peter Roe
- 6 – (England) Mike Balson
- 7 – (South Africa) Steve Wegerle 35 Apps 26 Goals
- 8 – (England) Rodney Marsh (player/head coach)
- 9 – (United States) Jay White
- 10 – (Argentina) Rubén Astigarraga
- 10 – (United States) Derek Sanderson
- 11 – (Scotland) Duncan MacEwan
- 12 – (Socialist Federal Republic of Yugoslavia) Tony Frankovich
- 12 – (South Africa) Derek Smethurst
- 13 – (United States) Tim Walters
- 14 – (South Africa) Geoff Wegerle
- 15 – (England) Mark Lindsay
- 16 – (South Africa) Karim Murabet
- 17 – (Canada) Paul Roe
- 18 – (South Africa) Nathan Sacks
- 19 – (United States) Nick Mangione
- 20 – (United States) Soloman Hilton
- 21 – (United States) Tim Borer
- 22 – (United States) Mike Fall
- 23 – (United States) Glenn Ervine
- (United States) Rui Farias

=== ASL/APSL: 1988–1993 ===
In the summer of 1988, the Rowdies joined the third incarnation of the American Soccer League. They would stay in this league and its successor (the APSL) until the team folded after the 1993 season. During this six year stretch they achieved moderate success, winning one division title and making the playoffs four times. In 1992 they finished as runners-up to Colorado in the regular season, in the Professional Cup final, and in the APSL final as well.

==== Year-by-year ====
Year	League	Won	Lost	Points	Regular season	Playoffs	U.S. Open Cup
1988	ASL	10	10	30	3rd, Southern	did not qualify	did not enter
1989	ASL	12	8	35	1st, Southern	Semifinals	did not enter
1990	APSL	10	10	29	2nd, ASL South	ASL Semifinals	did not enter
1991	APSL	8	13	69	3rd, American	did not qualify	did not enter
1992	APSL	10	6	87	2nd	Runners-up	did not enter
1993	APSL	12	12	118	3rd	Semifinals	did not enter

=== Players, coaches, and honors – post-NASL era ===
==== Honors – post-NASL ====
Championships

- 1992: ASPL (runner-up)
- 1992: Professional Cup (runner-up)

Division titles

- 1989: ASL Southern Division

Leading Scorer

- 1992: Jean Harbor (13 g, 4 a)

Top Goalkeeper

- 1988: Winston DuBose (0.75 gaa)

Assists Leader

- 1992: Kevin Sloan (6 a)

Coach of the Year

- 1992: Ricky Hill
- 1993: Ken Fogarty

FIFA World Cup players

- (Haiti) Arsène Auguste (1974)
- (Netherlands) Wim Suurbier (1974, 1978)
- (United States) Steve Trittschuh (1990)
- (United States) Peter Vermes (1990)

First Team All Star

- 1988: Winston DuBose, Steve Wegerle
- 1989: Winston DuBose, Steve Trittschuh, Steve Wegerle
- 1990: David Byrne
- 1992: Bill Andracki, Steve Trittschuh, Ricky Hill, Kevin Sloan, Jean Harbor
- 1993: Steve Trittschuh

Second Team All Star

- 1986–87: Arnie Mausser
- 1991: Marcelo Carrera
- 1993: Paul Dougherty, Pierre Morice

Honorable Mention

- 1986–87: Steve Wegerle

AISA All-Star Game selections

- 1986–87: Steve Wegerle (starter)
- 1986–87: Arnie Mausser (reserve)
- 1986–87: Glenn Ervine (reserve)
- 1986–87: Rubén Astigarraga (injured)
- 1986–87: Tim Walters (reserve)

U.S. Soccer Hall of Fame members

- 2013 Peter Vermes

Other National Halls of Fame

- 2016 Mark Lawrenson (England)

==== Coaches – post-NASL ====
- (England) Rodney Marsh: 1984–1987
- (Netherlands) Wim Suurbier: 1986–87
- (England) Ken Fogarty: 1989–1992
- (South Africa) Steve Wegerle: 1991–1992
- (England) Ricky Hill: 1992
- (England) Ken Fogarty: 1993

==== Team captains – post-NASL ====
- (United States) Dave Power: 1986–1989
- (United States) Derek Backman: 1990
- (South Africa) David Byrne: 1991
- (England) Ricky Hill: 1992
- (England) Terry Rowe: 1993

== Legacy ==
=== Tampa Bay Mutiny: 1996–2001 ===
Due largely to the Rowdies' historical success on and off the pitch, in 1994 MLS selected the Tampa Bay Mutiny as one of its original ten teams. The Mutiny won the first Supporters' Shield and qualified for the playoffs in four of their six seasons. Several former Rowdies, including Perry Van der Beck, Farrukh Quraishi, Roy Wegerle and Steve Trittschuh, were involved with the Mutiny as players, coaches, or front office staff. They also played for three seasons on the Rowdies' home pitch, Tampa Stadium. While the Mutiny have no connection to either Rowdies franchise, the team often paid tribute to the former Rowdies by wearing jerseys of their colors, and even wearing the logo of both the Tampa Bay Mutiny and Rowdies on the same shirt.

MLS initially operated the team with the hope of selling to a private local owner. That became difficult after Malcolm Glazer bought the Tampa Bay Buccaneers of the National Football League in 1995 and demanded the community build a new stadium. Raymond James Stadium was completed in 1998 and Tampa Stadium was demolished soon thereafter, forcing the Mutiny to move to the new facility.

The Bucs' lease agreement in their new home allowed them to keep most non-ticket revenues from all events at the facility, including Mutiny matches, severely damaging the financial viability of the soccer club. As financial losses mounted (up to $2 million a year), MLS desperately courted Glazer to buy the Mutiny. Glazer declined, so the league opted to fold the Mutiny, along with the other Florida-based MLS team of that era, the Miami Fusion, in early 2002.

=== New Rowdies: 2010–present ===
In 2008, it was announced that a new incarnation of the Tampa Bay Rowdies would play in a new second division NASL. They wore striped green and gold kits similar to the old Rowdies, and a star reflecting the 1975 championship. After several changes to the league, Tampa Bay finally kicked off in the summer of 2010, but they took the pitch as "FC Tampa Bay" due to a licensing dispute over the Rowdies name and trademarks. Beginning in 2012, the team reached an agreement to officially use the Rowdies name along with logos and other intellectual property of the original team, and won Soccer Bowl 2012.

To date, the new Rowdies have honored both Mike Connell's and Perry Van der Beck's significant contribution to soccer, both on and off the field in the community at large, by retiring their jerseys. The Rowdies won the 2012 NASL Championship. As of 2017 they are currently members of the second division, United Soccer League, and have announced their intention to gain entry into MLS's next wave of expansion.

=== Rowdies Cup ===
The South Florida Bulls annually face their crosstown rivals, the Tampa Spartans, in an NCAA men's preseason soccer match which celebrates the Tampa Bay Area's rich soccer history. In addition to holding the Rowdies Cup trophy for the next 12 months, the winning side also get to hoist the actual Soccer Bowl trophy that was won originally by the Rowdies in 1975. The trophy is currently housed at Corbett Soccer Stadium on the USF campus. Formerly called the Mayor's Cup from 1979 until 2005, as of the 2019 edition, USF holds a 24–10–3 edge in the all-time series, which dates back to 1972.

=== Tampa Bay Terror and Florida Tropics SC ===
Indoor soccer by the Rowdies had officially ended when the team played in the American Indoor Soccer Association for one season (1986–87). For two seasons, another Tampa Bay area team played in the same league, from 1995 to 1997, called the Tampa Bay Terror; however, the team did not last more than two seasons, despite having some members of the Rowdies on the roster. It was not until 2016 that a stable indoor soccer team played in the region. Another unrelated indoor soccer team called the Florida Tropics SC have played in the Major Arena Soccer League since 2016. The team eventually began outdoor competition, also competing in the developmental United Premier Soccer League. Despite being unrelated to the Rowdies, these two teams succeed the Tampa Bay region in indoor soccer since the original Rowdies had folded.
