= Farrukh Quraishi =

Iranian-American sports announcer (born 1951)

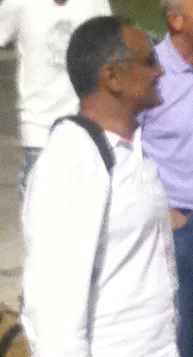

Personal information
- Date of birth: November 13, 1951 (age 74)
- Place of birth: Masjid-I-Sulaiman, Iran
- Position: Defender

College career
Years	Team	Apps	(Gls)
1972–1974	Oneonta Red Dragons		

Senior career*
Years	Team	Apps	(Gls)
1975–1980	Tampa Bay Rowdies	77	(0)
1977	Wycombe Wanderers	13	(0)
1979–1980	Tampa Bay Rowdies (indoor)	13	(2)
1980–1981	Calgary Boomers (indoor)	14	(2)
- * Club domestic league appearances and goals

Farrukh Quraishi (Persian: فرخ قریشی, born November 13, 1951) is an Iranian retired footballer. He spent six seasons in the North American Soccer League playing for the Tampa Bay Rowdies and Calgary Boomers. Since retiring from playing, he has held numerous executive positions with the United States Soccer Federation. Quraishi won the 1974 Hermann Trophy. Most recently he was the President and General Manager of the modern Tampa Bay Rowdies.

== Playing career ==
=== Youth ===
Quraishi was born in Iran, but grew up in Slough, near London, England. He went to Burnham Grammar School. In the late 1960s, Francisco Marcos, who later founded the United Soccer Leagues (USL), was an assistant coach at Oneonta State and a fledgling soccer entrepreneur. He had created American International Sports Exchange to coordinate overseas soccer tours for U.S. teams. On one of these trips in 1970, Marcos met Quraishi and convinced him to attend and play soccer at Oneonta State. Over his three years with Oneonta, Quraishi developed into one of the era's best college players. He was a member of the 1972 Oneonta team which lost to SIU-E in the NCAA Division II championship game. That year he was selected to the 1972 State University of New York Conference All Conference team, an honor he repeated in 1973 and 1974. Although the team did not advance as far his junior and senior year, he was showered with accolades, being named a first team All American in 1973 and 1974. He capped this when he was named the 1974 Hermann Trophy winner as the best collegiate player in the nation. Oneonta State inducted Quraishi into its Athletic Hall of Fame in 1999.

=== Professional ===
In 1975, the Tampa Bay Rowdies of the North American Soccer League selected Quraishi with the first overall pick in the NASL college draft. That season, despite being a rookie, Quraishi was named to the NASL All Star First Team. However, Quraishi remained committed to his education, which he had not yet finished, and continued to study while playing. In 1976, he graduated from Oneonta with a bachelor's degree in sociology. Quraishi struggled with injuries, including a broken leg, which had a severe negative impact on his career. While he played 21 games as a rookie, he never again saw that many games in a season. In 1976, he played fifteen and in 1977 fourteen games. In the first half of the 1977–78 season, he played 15 games for English semi-professional team Wycombe Wanderers. He lost the entire 1978 season due to the broken leg but came back strong in 1979, seeing time in eighteen games. However, injuries again reduced his playing time and he entered only nine games in 1980. He then moved to the expansion Calgary Boomers for whom he played one indoor season, 1980–1981. At the end of the indoor season, he retired from playing professionally and moved back to Tampa.

== Administrative career ==
=== Public relations ===
While playing with the Rowdies, Quraishi also served as the team's director of youth development. In this capacity he got his first taste of managing and developing a team's infrastructure. While the players are the natural focus of any sport, these players are supported by owners, executives, managers, salesmen, etc. Quraishi gained valuable exposure to this side of soccer at an early point in his career and it served him well for the rest of his life. As part of his duties in community relations, Quraishi developed soccer leagues and soccer camps throughout the Tampa Bay area. When he returned to Tampa, Caspers Company, a McDonald's franchisee, hired him as its director of public relations. As part of his duties, he placed the McDonald's name and logo into the public's awareness through charity and youth events. Among these was the establishment of the McDonald's Sun Bowl International Youth Soccer Tournament. He remained with the company until 1992 when he re-entered the soccer world full-time as Orlando, Florida’s venue executive director for the 1994 FIFA World Cup.

=== Tampa Bay Mutiny ===
After the World Cup, Quraishi became involved in the establishment of Major League Soccer (MLS). MLS began developing itself prior to its first season in 1996, Quraishi became part of the process of bringing a franchise to Tampa Bay. When MLS created the Tampa Bay Mutiny, it hired Quraishi as the team's president and general manager. Despite a successful inaugural season, the Mutiny, which was one of three teams directly owned by the league, had one of the lowest average attendances in MLS. Despite winning the Supporter's Shield for having the best regular season record in MLS, winning the Eastern Conference regular season title, producing the league MVP (Carlos Valderrama), scoring champion (Roy Lassiter), rookie of the year (Steve Ralston), coach of the year (Thomas Rongen) and six players named to the MLS All-Star team, Quraishi was fired by then MLS commissioner Doug Logan. Reasons given for Quraishi's firing were poor attendance and the fact that the team's director of finance, Mark Fortunat, was charged with embezzling money from the club. As one of three teams directly owned by the league (the others were San Jose and Dallas), the team's director of finance also reported directly to the finance department at MLS headquarters in Los Angeles. Quraishi was not implicated in the Fortunat incident and was in fact instrumental in Fortunat being convicted of the charges when MLS decided to drop the matter. As a result of Quraishi's firing, Thomas Rongen, the team's head coach, resigned and moved to the New England Revolution.

=== United Soccer League ===
Despite this disappointment, Quraishi did not leave soccer management, but became a professional sports consultant for two years before moving to Massachusetts in 1998 to join Massachusetts Professional Soccer where he served as executive vice president and chief operating officer, overseeing the management of the Boston Bulldogs, the Cape Cod Crusaders and the Boston Renegades.. Quraishi also worked as a soccer broadcast announcer and worked with Master Coach International, a match and player video analysis company that developed proprietary software. In 2004, he was appointed to the USL Owners Advisory Council.

=== Tampa Bay Rowdies ===
On November 18, 2014, Quraishi was named president and General Manager of the Tampa Bay Rowdies. The Rowdies fired Farrukh Quraishi August 21, 2015.
