= 1983 Tulsa Roughnecks season =

Tulsa Roughnecks
1983 season
- General manager: (United States) Alex Skotarek
- Head coach: (England) Terry Hennessey
- Stadium: Skelly Stadium
- NASL: Southern Division: 1st Overall: 5th
- NASL playoffs: Winners
- Top goalscorer: League: (England) Ron Futcher (15 goals); All: (England) Ron Futcher (21 goals)
- Highest home attendance: 19,160 (May 21 vs. New York)
- Lowest home attendance: 7,499 (June 8 vs. Ft. Lauderdale)
- Average home league attendance: 12,417
Home colors	Away colors

The 1983 Tulsa Roughnecks season was the club's sixth season of existence, and their fifth in the North American Soccer League, the top flight of American soccer at that time. The 1983 season was Terry Hennessey's second full NASL season as head coach of the Roughnecks.

On October 1, 1983, Tulsa defeated Toronto 2–0 in Soccer Bowl '83 in Vancouver, becoming the first professional franchise to win a sports championship title in the state of Oklahoma.

== Club ==
=== Roster ===
No.	Position	Nation	Player
0	GK	USA	Winston DuBose
1	GK	CAN	Željko Bilecki
2	DF	CAN	Terry Moore
3	DF	ENG	Barry Wallace
4	MF	ENG	Pasquale Fuccillo
5	DF	USA	Val Fernandes
6	FW	USA	Njego Pesa
7	FW	BRA	Zequinha
8	FW	ENG	Ron Futcher
9	MF	IRI	Iraj Danaeifard
10	MF	IRL	Gerry Reardon
11	FW	NGR	Thompson Usiyan
12	MF	NIR	Billy Caskey
13	MF	USA	Todd Saldana
14	FW	ENG	Laurie Abrahams
15	MF	USA	Carmelo D'Anzi
17	MF	POL	Adam Krupa
18	DF	NIR	Victor Moreland
20	DF	CAN	Ivan Belfiore
22	GK	USA	Paul Coffee

=== Management and technical staff ===
- (United States) Carl Moore – Co-Owner
- (United States) Mike Kimbrel – Co-Owner
- (United States) Rick Lowenherz – Co-Owner
- (United States) Fred Williams – Co-Owner
- (United States) Alex Skotarek – General Manager
- (United States) Jim Boeh – Communications Director
- (Wales) Terry Hennessey – Head Coach
- (England) Steve Earle – Assistant Coach
- (United States) Larry Egge – Trainer

=== Honors ===
The Roughnecks received two individual honors following the 1983 NASL season.

- Soccer Bowl Man of the Match: Njego Pesa
- NASL All-Star, First Team: Barry Wallace

== Competitions ==
=== Friendlies ===
13 April 1983 friendly	Fort Lauderdale Strikers	2–1	Tulsa Roughnecks	Lake Worth
20:00 EDT	Kidd (48:48); Kidd 66'; Kidd (red card) 88'	Report	Saldana 36'	Stadium: John Leonard High School Stadium; Attendance: 1,200

friendly	Jacksonville Tea Men (ASL)	0–3	Tulsa Roughnecks	Jacksonville
		Report	,,	Stadium: Gator Bowl

3 May 1983 friendly	Oklahoma City Slickers (ASL)	3–3	Tulsa Roughnecks	Ponca City
	Kramer; Millinder (pen.); Hudson	Report	D'Anzi; D'Anzi 57'; Abrahams 67'	Stadium: Ponca City High School Stadium; Attendance: 1,500

27 May 1983 friendly	United States U20s	2–2	Tulsa Roughnecks	Anaheim
19:30 PDT	Sanderson,	Report 1 Report 2		Stadium: Glover Stadium

=== NASL regular season ===
==== Overview ====
Competition	First match	Last match	Starting round	Final position	Record							
Competition	First match	Last match	Starting round	Final position	Pld	W	D	L	GF	GA	GD	Win %
1983 Season	26 April 1983	1 October 1983	Matchday 1	Winners	30	17	0	13	56	49	+7	56.67
Total					30	17	0	13	56	49	+7	56.67

Source: Competitions

==== Division standings ====
W = Wins, L = Losses, GF = Goals For, GA = Goals Against, GD = Goal differential, PTS= point system

6 points for a win in regulation and overtime, 4 point for a shootout win, 0 points for a loss, 1 bonus point for each regulation goal scored, up to three per game.
- Qualified for NASL playoffs.

Southern Division	W	L	GF	GA	GD	PTS
Tulsa Roughnecks	17	13	56	49	+7	145
Fort Lauderdale Strikers	14	16	60	63	-3	136
Tampa Bay Rowdies	7	23	48	87	-39	83
Team America	10	20	33	54	-21	79

==== Overall league playoff seeding ====
Division champions automatically receive top three seeds
- Division champions

Pos	Club	G	W	L	GF	GA	GD	Pts
1	New York Cosmos	30	22	8	87	49	+38	194
2	Vancouver Whitecaps	30	24	6	63	34	+29	187
3	Tulsa Roughnecks	30	17	13	56	49	+7	145
4	Golden Bay Earthquakes	30	20	10	71	54	+17	169
5	Chicago Sting	30	15	15	66	73	-7	147
6	Fort Lauderdale Strikers	30	14	16	60	63	-3	136
7	Toronto Blizzard	30	16	14	51	48	+3	135
8	Montreal Manic	30	12	18	58	71	-13	124

==== Results by round ====
Round	1	2	3	4	5	6	7	8	9	10	11	12	13	14	15	16	17	18	19	20	21	22	23	24	25	26	27	28	29	30
Stadium	A	H	A	A	A	H	H	A	A	H	H	A	H	A	H	H	A	A	H	A	H	A	H	H	H	H	A	A	H	A
Result	L	W	L	L	L	L	W	L	L	L	W	W	W	W	L	W	L	W	W	L	W	L	W	L	W	W	W	W	W	W
Position	2	1	4	4	2	3	1	1	2	4	3	2	1	1	1	1	1	1	1	2	2	2	2	2	1	1	1	1	1	1

Updated to match(es) played on 17 August 2020. Source: Match reports
A = Away; H = Home; W = Win; D = Draw; L = Loss

==== Match reports ====
22 April 1983 1	Tampa Bay Rowdies	4–3	Tulsa Roughnecks	Tampa
20:00 EDT	Nogly (21:56); Rojas; Kozić (yellow card) 56:41'; Roe (yellow card) 68:20'; Connell (68:54); Tatu	Report	Belfiore (yellow card) 9:17'; Futcher (31:01); Usiyan (yellow card) 27:16' (yellow-red card) 55:06'; Caskey (yellow card) 23:21' (yellow-red card) 55:45'; Abrahams (62:07); Belfiore	Stadium: Tampa Stadium; Attendance: 10,925; Referee: Bob Evans

30 April 1983 2	Tulsa Roughnecks	1–0	Tampa Bay Rowdies	Tulsa
19:30 CDT	Futcher (yellow card) 33:38'; Moore (yellow card) 64:59'; Abrahams (73:08)	Report	Roe (yellow card) 27:30'; Connell (yellow card) 79:56'	Stadium: Skelly Stadium; Attendance: 18,953; Referee: Manuel Ortiz

8 May 1983 3	Team America	1–0	Tulsa Roughnecks	Washington, D.C.
17:00 EDT	Green 73'	Report		Stadium: RFK Stadium; Attendance: 14,211

11 May 1983 4	Montreal Manic	4–1	Tulsa Roughnecks	Montreal
20:00 EDT	Willey (43:38); Comrie (71:56); Comrie; Vujović	Report 1 Report 2	Zequinha (53:44)	Stadium: Olympic Stadium; Attendance: 5,280

15 May 1983 5	New York Cosmos	5–2	Tulsa Roughnecks	East Rutherford
14:30 EDT	Chinaglia (9:43); Chinaglia (34:52); Chinaglia; Moyers (72:50); Cabañas	Report 1 Report 2	Futcher (63:34); Futcher	Stadium: Giants Stadium; Attendance: 22,621

21 May 1983 6	Tulsa Roughnecks	1–2	New York Cosmos	Tulsa
19:50 CDT	Futcher (57:02)	Report 1 Report 2	Moyers (32:51); Cabañas (yellow card) 37'; Chinaglia	Stadium: Skelly Stadium; Attendance: 19,160; Referee: Robert Morgan

25 May 1983 7	Tulsa Roughnecks	3–1	Montreal Manic	Tulsa
19:30 CDT	Abrahams (48:42); Moore (yellow card) 55:31'; Zequinha; Futcher (71:51); DuBose (yellow card) 76:05'	Report	Mitchell (yellow card) 25:18'; Vujović (88:32)	Stadium: Skelly Stadium; Attendance: 9,364; Referee: Ed Bellion

30 May 1983 8	Golden Bay Earthquakes	3–1	Tulsa Roughnecks	San Jose
14:30 PDT	Žungul; Žungul (37:53); Žungul (86:45)	Report	Futcher (30:36); Billy Caskey (red card)	Stadium: Spartan Stadium; Attendance: 9,897

1 June 1983 9	Vancouver Whitecaps	1–2 (2OT)	Tulsa Roughnecks	Vancouver
19:30 PDT	Thijssen (28:01)	Report	Futcher (58:24); Watson 101:11'	Stadium: Empire Stadium; Attendance: 18,277; Referee: Majid Abotalebi

4 June 1983 10	Tulsa Roughnecks	0–1 (2OT)	Team America	Tulsa
19:30 CDT		Report	Dan Canter 102:24' (pen.)	Stadium: Skelly Stadium; Attendance: 11,742

8 June 1983 11	Tulsa Roughnecks	2–1 (OT)	Fort Lauderdale Strikers	Tulsa
19:30 CDT	Futcher (yellow card) 57:44'; Futcher; Futcher 93:36' (D'Anzi, Danaeifard)	Report 1 Report 2	Cubillas	Stadium: Skelly Stadium; Attendance: 7,499

12 June 1983 12	San Diego Sockers	1–2	Tulsa Roughnecks	San Diego
19:30 PDT	Wieczorkowski (77:38)	Report 1 Report 2	Futcher (10:35); Reardon (69:20)	Stadium: Jack Murphy Stadium; Attendance: 3,383

18 June 1983 13	Tulsa Roughnecks	4–0	Chicago Sting	Tulsa
19:30 CDT	D'Anzi (16:50); Pesa (75:32); Pesa; Futcher; Futcher (yellow card); Caskey (yellow card); D'Anzi (yellow card)	Report	Gruber (yellow card); Granitza (yellow card); Gallagher (yellow card)	Stadium: Skelly Stadium; Attendance: 16,089; Referee: Bob Evans

25 June 1983 14	Fort Lauderdale Strikers	1–1 (SO) (2–3 p)	Tulsa Roughnecks	Fort Lauderdale
20:00 EDT	Šegota (9:54); Villa (yellow card) 61:38'	Report 1 Report 2	Moreland (yellow card) 14:58'; Futcher (19:20); Moore (yellow card) 91:29'	Stadium: Lockhart Stadium; Attendance: 8,499
	Penalties
	Šegota (penalty missed); Kidd (penalty scored); Wegerle (penalty missed); Miller (penalty scored); Hudson (penalty missed)		(penalty scored) Pesa; (penalty scored) Wallace; (penalty scored) Reardon; (penalty missed) Futcher; (penalty missed) Moreland

29 June 1983 15	Tulsa Roughnecks	1–1 (SO) (2–3 p)	San Diego Sockers	Tulsa
19:30 CDT	Caskey (62:53)	Report 1 Report 2	Deyna (75:58)	Stadium: Skelly Stadium; Attendance: 9,157
	Penalties
	Wallace (penalty scored); Moreland (penalty scored) (penalty missed) (penalty missed) (penalty missed); Caskey (penalty missed)		(penalty scored) Willrich; (penalty scored) Deyna; (penalty missed) Wieczorkowski; (penalty missed) Coker (penalty missed); (penalty scored) Hirmez

3 July 1983 16	Tulsa Roughnecks	2–1 (OT)	Seattle Sounders	Tulsa
19:30 CDT	Abrahams (85:47); Evans 92:35' (o.g.)	Report	Peterson (0:55)	Stadium: Skelly Stadium; Attendance: 13,191

6 July 1983 17	Toronto Blizzard	2–1	Tulsa Roughnecks	Toronto
20:00 EDT	Nicholl (76:38); Nicholl (87:29)	Report	Wallace (86:45)	Stadium: Exhibition Stadium; Attendance: 8,099

9 July 1983 18	Chicago Sting	1–1 (SO) (1–3 p)	Tulsa Roughnecks	Chicago
19:30 CDT	Droege (yellow card); Gallagher (yellow card); Margetic (yellow card) , (red card); Alonso (yellow card); Roy (red card); Granitza (89:57)	Report 1 Report 2	Futcher; Moore (yellow card) , (red card); Moreland (yellow card)	Stadium: Soldier Field; Attendance: 10,276; Referee: Manuel Ortiz
	Penalties
	Huson (penalty scored); M. Twellman (penalty scored); Granitza (penalty missed); Tyma (penalty missed)		(penalty scored) Abrahams; (penalty scored) Pesa; (penalty missed) Futcher; (penalty scored) Wallace

13 July 1983 19	Tulsa Roughnecks	4–0	Chicago Sting	Tulsa
19:30 CDT	Pesa (yellow card) 0:42'; Pesa; Pesa; Usiyan (73:41); Pesa (87:42)	Report 1 Report 2		Stadium: Skelly Stadium; Attendance: 14,124; Referee: Ed Bellion

17 July 1983 20	New York Cosmos	3–0	Tulsa Roughnecks	East Rutherford
19:00 EDT	Moyers; Cabañas; Romero; Cabañas (yellow card)	Report		Stadium: Giants Stadium; Attendance: 24,296; Referee: Howard Krollfeifer

23 July 1983 21	Tulsa Roughnecks	3–2	Fort Lauderdale Strikers	Tulsa
19:30 CDT	Pesa; Caskey (yellow card) 56:00'; Wallace (67:11); Danaeifard (69:53); D'Anzi (yellow card) 81:59'	Report	Šegota (4:39); Walsh (yellow card) 20:38'; Šegota; Villa (yellow card) 56:00'; Davies (yellow card) 67:31'	Stadium: Skelly Stadium; Attendance: 11,134

27 July 1983 22	Seattle Sounders	3–1	Tulsa Roughnecks	Seattle
19:30 PDT	Ward (8:08); Evans (61:03); Kemp (85:35)	Report	Abrahams (39:59)	Stadium: Kingdome; Attendance: 4,270

30 July 1983 23	Tulsa Roughnecks	2–1 (2OT)	Vancouver Whitecaps	Tulsa
19:30 CDT	Pesa (39:18); Krupa 99:24' (Abrahams, Fuccillo)	Report 1 Report 2	Lorimer (57:59); Lettieri (yellow card) 90:00', (red card) 99:24'	Stadium: Skelly Stadium; Attendance: 10,809; Referee: Bob Evans

6 August 1983 24	Tulsa Roughnecks	1–2	Golden Bay Earthquakes	Tulsa
19:30 CDT	Pesa (34:45)	Report	Ingram (37:08); Ingram (73:45)	Stadium: Skelly Stadium; Attendance: 11,290

13 August 1983 25	Tulsa Roughnecks	1–0	Toronto Blizzard	Tulsa
19:30 CDT	Danaeifard	Report	Ragan (yellow card) 67', (red card) 67'	Stadium: Skelly Stadium; Attendance: 11,663

17 August 1983 26	Tulsa Roughnecks	4–1	Tampa Bay Rowdies	Tulsa
19:30 CDT	Krupa; Wallace (25:07); Wallace; Pesa	Report	Gerber (yellow card) 4:09' van der Veen (23:56) van der Veen (yellow card) 53:25'	Stadium: Skelly Stadium; Attendance: 9,752; Referee: Bill Schofield

21 August 1983 27	Team America	2–3	Tulsa Roughnecks	Washington, D.C.
14:30 EDT	Parkinson; Parkinson (63:00)	Report 1 Report 2	Abrahams; Futcher (70:45); Abrahams (88:51)	Stadium: RFK Stadium; Attendance: 4,423

27 August 1983 28	Fort Lauderdale Strikers	2–4	Tulsa Roughnecks	Fort Lauderdale
20:00 EDT	Šegota (32:57); Kidd	Report	Abrahams; Pesa (yellow card) 41:00'; Futcher; Moreland (yellow card) 64:30'; Pesa; Wallace (yellow card) 77:50'	Stadium: Lockhart Stadium; Attendance: 12,814; Referee: Davis Socha

31 August 1983 29	Tulsa Roughnecks	1–0	Team America	Tulsa
19:30 CDT	Wallace	Report		Stadium: Skelly Stadium; Attendance: 12,322

3 September 1983 30	Tampa Bay Rowdies	1–3	Tulsa Roughnecks	Tampa
20:00 EDT	McLeod van der Veen (yellow card) 57:48'; Longwell (yellow card) 70:14'	Report	Abrahams (4:05); Futcher (yellow card) 13:21'; Danaeifard (yellow card) 27:28'; Caskey (yellow card) 32:08'; Krupa (yellow card) 42:59'; Pesa; Abrahams (85:20)	Stadium: Tampa Stadium; Attendance: 6,525; Referee: Angelo Bratsis

=== NASL Playoffs ===
==== Playoff bracket ====
Quarterfinals (Best-of-3)
1	New York Cosmos	2	0(2)	–
8	Montreal Manic	4	1(3)	–
3	Tulsa Roughnecks	3	4	–
6	Fort Lauderdale Strikers	2	2	–
4	Golden Bay Earthquakes	6	0	5
5	Chicago Sting	1	1	2
2	Vancouver Whitecaps	1	3	0
7	Toronto Blizzard	0	4	1

Semifinals (Best-of-3)
8	Montreal Manic	1(8)	1	0
3	Tulsa Roughnecks	2(9)	0	3
3	Golden Bay Earthquakes	0(3)	0	–
7	Toronto Blizzard	1(5)	2	–

Soccer Bowl '83 (Single match)
3	Tulsa Roughnecks	2
7	Toronto Blizzard	0

==== Quarter-finals ====
6 September 1983 Game 1	Tulsa Roughnecks	3–2 (2OT)	Fort Lauderdale Strikers	Tulsa
19:30 CDT	Pesa (8:11); Danaeifard (46:17); Futcher (yellow card) 93:49'; Fuccillo 101:24' (Abrahams, Krupa)	Report	Hudson; Šegota (yellow card) 37:54'; Davies	Stadium: Skelly Stadium; Attendance: 7,826; Referee: Bill Maxwell

10 September 1983 Game 2	Fort Lauderdale Strikers	2–4	Tulsa Roughnecks	Fort Lauderdale
20:00 EDT	Davies (7:50); Bolitho (yellow card) 9:55'; Davies; Hudson (yellow card) 32:54'; Kidd (yellow card) 34:19'	Report	Pesa (yellow card) 32:33'; Moreland (yellow card) 34:19'; Fuccillo (red card) 79:40'; Abrahams (80:58); Futcher (83:20); Futcher; Rongen (89:32)	Stadium: Lockhart Stadium; Attendance: 8,873; Referee: Gord Arrowsmith (Canada)

==== Semi-finals ====
18 September 1983 Game 1	Tulsa Roughnecks	1–1 (SO) (9–8 p)	Montreal Manic	Tulsa
19:30 CDT	Futcher (yellow card) 71:00'; Futcher	Report 1 Report 2	Mitchell (78:57)	Stadium: Skelly Stadium; Attendance: 10,625; Referee: Gino D'Ippolito (USA)
	Penalties
	(penalty scored) (penalty scored) (penalty scored) (penalty scored) (penalty scored) (penalty scored) (penalty scored) (penalty scored) (penalty missed) (penalty missed); Pesa (penalty scored)		(penalty scored) (penalty scored) (penalty scored) (penalty scored) (penalty scored) (penalty scored) (penalty scored) (penalty scored) (penalty missed) (penalty missed); (penalty missed) Quinn

26 September 1983 Game 2	Montreal Manic	1–0	Tulsa Roughnecks	Montreal
20:00 EDT	Quin (yellow card) 49:52'; Gray (yellow card) 56:52'; Lodeweges (yellow card) 85:24'; Lodeweges (88:05)	Report	Belfiore (yellow card) 42:31'; Moreland (yellow card) 44:39'; Pesa (yellow card) 75:33'	Stadium: Olympic Stadium; Attendance: 16,185; Referee: Peter Johnson (USA)

28 September 1983 Game 3	Tulsa Roughnecks	3–0	Montreal Manic	Tulsa
20:30 CDT	Futcher (yellow card) 26:05'; Futcher; Futcher; Wallace (53:42)	Report 1 Report 2		Stadium: Skelly Stadium; Attendance: 18,090; Referee: Toros Kibritjan (USA)

==== Final ====
1 October 1983 Soccer Bowl '83	Tulsa Roughnecks	2–0	Toronto Blizzard	Vancouver
16:00 (PDT)	Pesa; Futcher		Spalding (yellow card) 2'; Wilson (yellow card) 52'	Stadium: BC Place Stadium; Attendance: 53,326; Referee: Ed Bellion

== Statistics ==
=== Season scoring ===
GP = Games Played, G = Goals (worth 2 points), A = Assists (worth 1 point), Pts = Points

Player	GP	G	A	Pts
Ron Futcher	26	15	10	40
Laurie Abrahams	22	11	11	33
Njego Pesa	24	11	2	24
Barry Wallace	26	5	5	15
Iraj Danaeifard	22	2	10	14
Adam Krupa	24	4	6	10
Zequinha	16	2	4	8
Thompson Usiyan	11	1	4	6
Billy Caskey	22	1	3	5
Gerry Reardon	24	1	2	4
Carmelo D'Anzi	7	1	2	4
Victor Moreland	26	0	4	4
Pasquale Fuccillo	19	0	4	4
Val Fernandes	19	0	3	3
Terry Moore	28	0	1	2
Ivan Belfiore	20	0	1	2
Todd Saldana	10	0	1	1
Winston DuBose	30	0	1	1
own goals	na	1	na	na

=== Season goalkeeping ===
Note: GP = Games played; Min = Minutes played; Svs = Saves; GA = Goals against; GAA = Goals against average; W = Wins; L = Losses; SO = Shut outs

Player	GP	Min	Svs	GA	GAA	W	L	SO
Winston DuBose	30	2783	136	48	1.55	17	13	5

=== Playoff scoring ===
G = Goals (worth 2 points), A = Assists (worth 1 point), Pts = Points

Player	G	A	Pts
Ron Futcher	6	0	12
Laurie Abrahams	1	4	6
Njego Pesa	2	1	5
Barry Wallace	1	2	4
Iraj Danaeifard	1	1	3
Adam Krupa	0	3	3
Pasquale Fuccillo	1	0	2
Val Fernandes	0	2	2
Billy Caskey	0	1	1
Terry Moore	0	1	1
Victor Moreland	0	1	1
Thompson Usiyan	0	1	1
Winston DuBose	0	1	1
own goals	1	na	na

=== Playoff goalkeeping ===
Note: GP = Games played; Min = Minutes played; Svs = Saves; GA = Goals against; GAA = Goals against average; W = Wins; L = Losses; SO = Shut outs

Player	GP	Min	Svs	GA	GAA	W	L	SO
Winston DuBose	6	587	23	6	0.952	5	1	2
