= 1983 Tampa Bay Rowdies indoor season =

Tampa Bay Rowdies
1983 indoor season
- Owner: (United States) George Strawbridge, Jr. (United States) Lamar Hunt (United States) Bill McNutt
- General manager: (United States) Ted Moore
- Manager: (United States) Al Miller
- Stadium: Bayfront Center, Lakeland Civic Center
- NASL Grand Prix: Round robin: 2nd Grand Prix: Champions
- Top goalscorer: League: (United States) Hugo Pérez (10 goals); All: (United States) Hugo Pérez (Brazil) Tatu (12 goals)
- Highest home attendance: 5,545 (Feb. 5 vs. Strikers)
- Lowest home attendance: 3,506 (Feb. 25 vs. Strikers)
- Average home league attendance: 4,756
Home colors	Away colors

The 1983 Tampa Bay Rowdies indoor season was the ninth indoor season of the team's existence. The Rowdies captured the Indoor Grand Prix title. Although they would play for another 10 years, including two more indoors in 1983–84 and 1986–87, this would be the final trophy won by the original club.

== Overview ==
Nearly all of the NASL teams opted out of participating in a full 1982–83 indoor season. Four clubs (Fort Lauderdale Strikers, Montreal Manic, Tulsa Roughnecks and Tampa Bay) played in a scaled down indoor tournament called the Grand Prix of Indoor Soccer. In this format each team would play a total of eight times, consisting of three weeks of double round-robin play, followed by a seeded "championship weekend" of matches.

A four-week long "shootout challenge" competition sponsored by Molson beer, was also played each match day, with the overall winners splitting a $5,000 purse on the final day.

Overall Tampa Bay fared well in the round-robin stage with a 4–2 record and 42 points. However, both losses were to Montreal who had finished with an identical record and points. The Manic earned the number one seed based on the head-to-head tiebreaker. This paired Tampa Bay up with the 3–3 Roughnecks for the semifinals. The Rowdies defeated Tulsa, 8–6, with a third quarter barrage that eventually turned a one-goal deficit into a three-goal cushion. That victory earned them a rematch with Montreal for the Grand Prix title.

In the championship final, "Le Manic" and the Rowdies battled back and forth into double overtime at the Montreal Forum. The visitors gained a 2–0 advantage, before Dale Mitchell put Montreal in the lead with a second period hat-trick. Each team added a goal in the third quarter. Tampa Bay continued to trail for most of the fourth until Zequinha tied the match with 1:55 remaining to send it to sudden death overtime. The first extra session failed to produce a golden goal, but with just under two minutes lapsed in the second overtime Mark Karpun beat his defender down the left wing. He then tucked a shot past Manic goalie, Mehdi Cerbah, inside the far post for the game winner and the Rowdies' third indoor trophy.

Combined with their 4–0 record in friendlies, the Tampa Bay Rowdies completed their winter 1983 indoor schedule with a record of 10–2 in all matches. The Rowdies also won the finals of the $5,000 shootout challenge against Fort Lauderdale. In that event, goalie Jürgen Stars stopped all five Strikers' shots, while Wes McLeod and Hugo Perez converted their attempts for a 2–0 victory.

== Club ==
The team's winter roster saw numerous changes over the course of the brief indoor season. Goalkeeper, Tom Boric was lost for the remainder of the indoor season after a knee injury in the Rowdies' second grand prix match on January 22. Defender, Mike Connell was only able to appear in one match because of a nagging Achilles injury. With Connell injured, Wes McLeod served as team captain for the 12-game indoor season Brazilian indoor specialist Tatu did not arrive from São Paulo FC until January 28, because of transfer issues, and missed the first four games. Peter Roe missed the final six matches with a broken toe.

Around the same time the NASL began the ill-fated Team America experiment. The February try-outs for Team America overlapped with the Grand Prix schedule and as a result Arnie Mausser, Pedro DeBrito, Perry Van der Beck and Glenn Myernick became unavailable to the Rowdies for several games including the semifinal and championship matches. This forced the Tampa Bay coach, Al Miller to use rookies and reserve team players more often.

=== Roster ===
No.	Position	Nation	Player
00	GK	USA	Arnie Mausser
1	GK	GER	Jürgen Stars
2	DF	GER	Peter Gruber
3	DF	USA	Glenn Myernick
4	DF	YUG	Refik Kozić
5	DF	GER	Peter Nogly
6	DF	RSA	Mike Connell
7	FW	BRA	Zequinha
8	MF	CAN	Wes McLeod (capt.)
10	FW	BRA	Tatu
11	MF	BRA	Marcelino Oliveira
12	MF	USA	Perry Van der Beck
14	MF	ARG	Juan Carlos Molina
15	MF	CAN	Peter Roe
16	FW	USA	Pedro DeBrito
17	DF	USA	Gregg Thompson
18	FW	CAN	Mark Karpun
19	FW	USA	Hugo Pérez
20	GK	CAN	Tom Boric
21	DF	CAN	Bruce Bates
22	MF	USA	Matty Miller
23	MF	CAN	Jim Easton
—	MF	USA	Mike Fall

=== Management and technical staff ===
- (United States) George W. Strawbridge, Jr., owner
- (United States) Lamar Hunt, co-owner
- (United States) Bill McNutt, co-owner
- (United States) Ted Moore, general manager
- (Portugal) Francisco Marcos, director of player personal
- (United States) Al Miller, head coach
- (United States) Ken Shields, trainer
- (United States) Alfredo Beronda, equipment manager

=== Honors ===
- NASL Grand Prix of Indoor Soccer: Champions
- Grand Prix assists leader: Wes McLeod (12)

== Competitions ==
=== Friendlies ===
The Rowdies participated in and won four friendlies. The first was played at Reunion Arena in Dallas against Tulsa. Three days before the grand prix began they faced Tulsa again at Oklahoma City's Myriad Arena. A mid-grand prix friendly pitted the club against Montreal at the Bayfront Center on January 29. Finally, in-state rival, Fort Lauderdale, met Tampa Bay at the Lakeland Civic Center in a post-tournament fixture, to close out the Rowdies' abbreviated 1983 indoor campaign.

=== Grand Prix round-robin table ===
G = Games, W = Wins, L = Losses, GF = Goals For, GA = Goals Against, GD = Goal Differential, PTS= point system

6 points awarded for a win. Beginning with the fourth goal, 1 bonus point awarded for each goal scored. Maximum of 5 bonus points per game.

Pos	Team	G	W	L	GF	GA	GD	PTS
1*	Montreal Manic	6	4	2	36	31	+5	42
2	Tampa Bay Rowdies	6	4	2	38	31	+7	42
3	Tulsa Roughnecks	6	3	3	33	37	−4	33
4	Ft. Lauderdale Strikers	6	1	5	32	40	−8	20

*Montreal wins top seed based on 2–0 head-to-head record vs. Tampa Bay.

=== Grand Prix Championship rounds ===
Semifinals
1	Montreal Manic	11
4	Fort Lauderdale Strikers	4
3	Tulsa Roughnecks	6
2	Tampa Bay Rowdies	8

Championship Final
1	Montreal Manic	4
2	Tampa Bay Rowdies	5(2OT)

=== Match reports ===
January 15, 1983 friendly	Tulsa Roughnecks	3–6	Tampa Bay Rowdies	Dallas, Texas
	Belfiore 8:42' (Krupa, DuBose); Danaeifard 36:17'; Pesa 55:57' (Abrahams)	Report 1 Report 2(p. 2C)	McLeod 6:59' (Nogly, Pérez); Karpun 37:23'; Zequinha 39:53' (Molina, Nogly); Van der Beck 42:30' (Roe); McLeod 51:45'; Pérez 56:33' (Zequinha)	Stadium: Reunion Arena; Attendance: 5,451

January 18, 1983 friendly	Tulsa Roughnecks	3–5	Tampa Bay Rowdies	Oklahoma City, Oklahoma
7:30 PM (CST)	Saldana 21:07'; Saldana 21:29' (Danaiford); Saldana 52:00' (Riordan)	Report 1 Report 2 Report 3	Nogly 19:08' (Oliveira); Van der Beck 19:19'; McLeod 22:55' (Myernick); Karpun 24:51' (Myernick); Roe 28:23' (Karpun, Nogly)	Stadium: Myriad Arena; Attendance: 2,551

January 21, 1983 Matchday 1	Montreal Manic	6–3	Tampa Bay Rowdies	Tulsa, Oklahoma
7:00 PM (CST)	Ion 16:37' (Vujović); Quinn 23:33'; Knight 39:42'; Dill 41:52' (Vujović); Knight 45:27' (Mitchell); Vujović 57:53' (O'Brien)	Report 1 Report 2	Kozić 3:02' (Pérez); Zequinha 44:21'; Nogly 47:34' (Myernick)	Stadium: Tulsa Fairgrounds Pavilion; Attendance: 3,552

January 22, 1983 Matchday 2	Tulsa Roughnecks	2–7	Tampa Bay Rowdies	Tulsa, Oklahoma
9:00 PM (CST)	Caskey 14:51'; Pesa 55:00' (Krupa)	Report 1 Report 2	Zequinha 27:44' (Bates); Pérez 31:58' (McLeod); Pérez 32:10' (Roe, McLeod); Roe 45:31' (Gruber, McLeod); Myernick 47:44' (McLeod, Oliveira); Zequinha 48:15' (Roe, Oliveira); Pérez 55:16' (Roe)	Stadium: Tulsa Fairgrounds Pavilion; Attendance: 4,341

January 29, 1983 friendly	Tampa Bay Rowdies	7–5	Montreal Manic	St. Petersburg, Florida
7:30 PM (EST)	Karpun 7:38' (Myernick); Tatu 34:32' (Molina, Kozić); Oliveira 35:46' (Molina, Myernick); Tatu 39:05' (Molina); Pérez 40:28' (McLeod); Nogly 48:47' (Pérez); Van der Beck 58:37'	Report 1 Report 2(p. 2C)	Mitchell 18:46'; Willey 24:27' (Falzon, Knight); Usiyan 37:56' (Marcantonio, Lodeweges); Usiyan 39:40'; Mitchell 40:40' (O'Brien)	Stadium: Bayfront Center; Attendance: 5,525

February 4, 1983 Matchday 3	Tampa Bay Rowdies	7–6	Tulsa Roughnecks	St. Petersburg, Florida
9:00 PM (EST)	Myernick 1:51' (Zequinha); Gruber 8:15' (Roe, Pérez); Oliveira 18:59' (Myernick); Tatu 22:14' (Nogly); Pérez 22:50'; Pérez 34:17' (Nogly, Roe); Tatu 47:02' (Nogly, McLeod)	Report 1 Report 2(p. 2C)	Wallace 13:30'; Pesa 37:33' (Huson, Caskey); Weller 43:23' (pen.); Weller 49:15' (Wallace); Caskey 56:26' (Moore); Weller 59:54' (Pesa)	Stadium: Bayfront Center; Attendance: 4,450; Referee: Gus Constantine

February 5, 1979 Matchday 4	Tampa Bay Rowdies	10–6	Fort Lauderdale Strikers	St. Petersburg, Florida
9:00 PM (EST)	Zequinha 4:35' (pen.); Tatu 6:01' (Van der Beck); Molina 17:15' (Myernick, Tatu); McLeod 26:21' (Van der Beck, Gruber); McLeod 45:46' (Oliveira, Tatu); Pérez 51:22' (Bates); Pérez 54:09' (McLeod); Tatu 56:02' (McLeod, Nogly); McLeod 59:00' (Kozić, Tatu); DeBrito 59:25' (McLeod, Oliveira)	Report 1 Report 2	Cubillas 12:21' (Šegota); Szatmari 14:26' (Cubillas); Šegota 25:55' (Wegerle); Šegota 40:42' (Cubillas); Bolitho 46:45' (Cubillas, Šegota); Cubillas 59:35' (Strong, Meschbach)	Stadium: Bayfront Center; Attendance: 5,545

February 11, 1983 Matchday 5	Tampa Bay Rowdies	7–5	Fort Lauderdale Strikers	Tulsa, Oklahoma
7:00 PM (CST)	Tatu 8:36' (Nogly, Zequinha); Tatu 19:32' (Molina); Tatu 26:38' (Nogly, Molina); Karpun 38:07' (Molina); Karpun 39:21' (McLeod, Oliveira); Molina 51:29' (Zequinha); Pérez 54:25' (Zequinha, Tatu)	Report 1 Report 2	Šegota 25:32' (Cubillas); Šegota 28:02' (Whelan); Šegota 36:53' (Wegerle); Wegerle 41:51' (Kidd, Cubillas); Cubillas 42:46'	Stadium: Tulsa Fairgrounds Pavilion; Attendance: 2,064; Referee: Manuel Ortiz

February 12, 1983 Matchday 6	Tampa Bay Rowdies	4–5	Montreal Manic	Tulsa, Oklahoma
7:00 PM (CST)	Karpun 6:38' (Pérez); Molina 26:03' (Stars); Oliveira 26:57' (Kozić); Oliveira 46:06' (Tatu, Zequinha)	Report 1 Report 2	Towers 3:54' (Willey); Ion 28:51' (Vujović, Marcantonio); Mitchell 39:07' (Willey, Uremović); Mitchell 42:57' (Vujović); Vujović 44:32'	Stadium: Tulsa Fairgrounds Pavilion; Attendance: 3,245

February 18, 1983 Semifinal	Tampa Bay Rowdies	8–6	Tulsa Roughnecks	Montreal, Quebec
7:30 PM (EST)	Pérez 11:58' (McLeod, Kozić); Karpun 13:45' (McLeod); Zequinha 23:47' (Molina); McLeod 35:18' (Karpun); Nogly 40:26'; Karpun 41:14' (Gruber); Tatu 43:03' (Nogly); McLeod 59:56' (Nogly)	Report 1 Report 2	Pesa 5:38' (Berrio); Abrahams 6:15' (Caskey); Weller 12:18' (Wallace); Abrahams 31:13' (Weller ) Abrahams 53:23' (Weller); Pesa 55:44' (Caskey, Reardon)	Stadium: Montreal Forum, Montreal, Quebec; Attendance: 6,049

February 20, 1983 Finals	Montreal Manic	4–5 (2OT)	Tampa Bay Rowdies	Montreal, Quebec
3:30 PM (EST)	Mitchel 16:17'; Mitchel 19:51' (McGane); Mitchel 24:53' (Uremović); Lodeweges 44:01'	Report 1 Report 2 Report 3(p. 2C)	Tatu 7:06' (McLeod, Pérez); Pérez 11:12'; Nogly 31:46'; Zequinha 58:05' (Gruber, Tatu); Karpun 69:78' (Nogly)	Stadium: Montreal Forum, Montreal, Quebec; Attendance: 7,895; Referee: Gord Arrowsmith (Canada)

February 25, 1983 friendly	Tampa Bay Rowdies	8–5	Fort Lauderdale Strikers	Lakeland, Florida
8:00 PM (EST)	Tatu 6:15' (Gruber, Easton); Karpun 13:04'; Miller 22:55' (Pérez, Kozić); Karpun 31:35' (Fall); Gruber 44:42' (Fall); Molina 46:43' (Thompson); Bates 53:38' (Molina, McLeod); Oliveira 57:51' (Pérez, Molina)	Report 1 Report 2 Report 3(p. 2C)	Kidd 13:26' (Segota); Cubillas 23:55' (Kidd); Kidd 36:14' (Whelan); Meschbach 39:31' (Kadupski, Cubillas); Kidd 54:16' (Kadupski)	Stadium: Lakeland Civic Center; Attendance: 3,506

== Statistics ==
=== Scoring ===
GP = Games Played, G = Goals (worth 2 points), A = Assists (worth 1 point), Pts = Points

Player	GP	G	A	Pts
Hugo Pérez	12	12	8	32
Tatu	8	12	6	30
Wes McLeod	12	8	14	30
Mark Karpun	10	11	2	24
Peter Nogly	11	5	12	22
Zequinha	10	7	6	20
Juan Carlos Molina	10	4	10	18
Marcelino Oliveira	10	5	6	16
Glenn Myernick	7	2	7	11
Peter Roe	6	2	6	10
Peter Gruber	12	2	5	9
Perry Van der Beck	7	3	2	8
Refik Kozić	11	1	5	7
Bruce Bates	7	1	2	4
Pedro DeBrito	6	1	0	2
Matty Miller	1	1	0	2
Mike Fall	1	0	2	2
Jürgen Stars	9	0	1	1
Gregg Thompson	5	0	1	1
Jim Easton Jr.	4	0	1	1
Tom Boric	2	0	0	0
Mike Connell	1	0	0	0
Arnie Mausser	1	0	0	0

=== Goalkeeping ===
Note: GP = Games played; Min = Minutes played; SV = Saves; GA = Goals against; GAA = Goals against average; W = Wins; L = Losses

Player	GP	Min	SV	GA	GAA	W	L
Jürgen Stars	9	550	127	45	4.91	7	2
Tom Boric	2	120	38	5	2.50	2	0
Arnie Mausser	1	60	14	6	6.00	1	0

== See also ==
- 1983 team indoor stats
