= 1983 NASL Grand Prix of Indoor Soccer =

Indoor soccer tournament

North American Soccer League 1983 Grand Prix of Indoor
NASL Indoor Grand Prix

Tournament details
- Dates: January 21, 1983 – February 20, 1983
- Teams: 4

Final positions
- Champions: Tampa Bay Rowdies (3rd title)
- Runners-up: Montreal Manic

Tournament statistics
- Matches played: 16
- Goals scored: 199 (12.44 per match)
- Attendance: 37,111 (2,319 per match)
- Top scorer(s): (England) Laurie Abrahams (Canada) Dale Mitchell (12 goals)
- Best player(s): (England) Laurie Abrahams (Algeria) Mehdi Cerbah

The 1983 NASL Grand Prix of Indoor Soccer was an indoor soccer tournament staged by four franchises of the North American Soccer League.

== Overview ==
The NASL franchises from Fort Lauderdale, Tampa Bay, Montreal, and Tulsa opted to play the Grand Prix in early 1983 as a makeshift indoor season, because for various reasons, the eight other NASL clubs had chosen to forego playing a full 1982–83 NASL indoor season. Three of those eight teams (Chicago, Golden Bay and San Diego) had joined the Major Indoor Soccer League for 1982-83 season, while the remaining five squads chose to sit out winter indoor play completely.

The tournament consisted of three weeks of double round-robin play for the purpose of seeding, followed by a Championship weekend at the Forum in Montreal. Fort Lauderdale did not host a round because there was no suitable venue in the area that also met the minimum seating requirements. Instead, Tulsa hosted Rounds 1 and 3. The tournament would mark the third time NASL teams played in such an event, with the first two coming in 1975 and 1976. Additionally the teams participated in a season-long Shootout Challenge competition, the champions of which would split a $5,000 purse.

Montreal and Tampa Bay finished tied on both points and record after the preliminary rounds, but Montreal held the head-to-head tie-breaker, and with it the top seed. Tampa Bay won the championship final 5–4 on a golden goal by Mark Karpun at 1:58 of the second, seven and a half minute, overtime period. This victory marked the Rowdies' third indoor trophy and fourth title overall in the NASL. Laurie Abrahams of Tulsa led all scorers (12 goals, 6 assists) and was named the offensive MVP, while Montreal goalie Mehdi Cerbah who posted a 4.36 goals-against-average was the defensive MVP of the tournament. Tampa Bay also won the $5,000 Shootout Challenge purse by defeating Ft. Lauderdale, 2–0, with Rowdies goalie Jürgen Stars stopping all three Strikers shots in the final round.

== Map of clubs ==
1983 NASL Grand Prix of Indoor Soccer Clubs

== Preliminary rounds ==
=== Round 1 ===
played at Tulsa Fairgrounds Pavilion in Tulsa, Oklahoma

January 21	Montreal Manic	6–3	Tampa Bay Rowdies	Attendance: 3,522

Fort Lauderdale Strikers	8–4	Tulsa Roughnecks

January 22	Montreal Manic	8–6	Fort Lauderdale Strikers	Attendance: 4,341

Tampa Bay Rowdies	7–2	Tulsa Roughnecks

=== Round 2 ===
played at the Bayfront Center in St. Petersburg, Florida

February 4	Montreal Manic	6–3	Fort Lauderdale Strikers	Attendance: 4,450

Tampa Bay Rowdies	7–6	Tulsa Roughnecks

February 5	Tulsa Roughnecks	7–4	Montreal Manic	Attendance: 5,545

Tampa Bay Rowdies	10–6	Fort Lauderdale Strikers

=== Round 3 ===
played at the Tulsa Fairgrounds Pavilion in Tulsa, Oklahoma

February 11	Tampa Bay Rowdies	7–5	Fort Lauderdale Strikers	Attendance: 2,064

Tulsa Roughnecks	8–7	Montreal Manic

February 12	Montreal Manic	5–4	Tampa Bay Rowdies	Attendance: 3,245

Tulsa Roughnecks	5–4 (OT)	Fort Lauderdale Strikers

=== Seeding ===
G = Games, W = Wins, L = Losses, GF = Goals For, GA = Goals Against, GD = Goal Differential, PTS= point system

6 points awarded for a win. Beginning with the fourth goal, 1 bonus point awarded for each goal scored. Maximum of 5 bonus points per game.

Pos	Team	G	W	L	GF	GA	GD	PTS
1*	Montreal Manic	6	4	2	36	31	+5	42
2	Tampa Bay Rowdies	6	4	2	38	31	+7	42
3	Tulsa Roughnecks	6	3	3	33	37	–4	33
4	Fort Lauderdale Strikers	6	1	5	32	40	–8	20

*Montreal wins top seed based on 2–0 head-to-head edge over Tampa Bay

== Grand Prix Championship rounds ==
=== Bracket ===
Semifinals
1	Montreal Manic	11
4	Fort Lauderdale Strikers	4
3	Tulsa Roughnecks	6
2	Tampa Bay Rowdies	8

Championship Final
1	Montreal Manic	4
2	Tampa Bay Rowdies	5(2OT)
Third place
3	Tulsa Roughnecks	9
4	Fort Lauderdale Strikers	4

=== Semi-finals ===
played at the Montreal Forum in Montreal, Quebec

February 18	Tampa Bay Rowdies	8–6	Tulsa Roughnecks	Attendance: 6,049

Montreal Manic	11–4	Fort Lauderdale Strikers

=== Third-place match ===
played at the Montreal Forum in Montreal, Quebec (1:30 PM EST)

February 20	Tulsa Roughnecks	9–4	Fort Lauderdale Strikers

=== Championship final ===
February 20, 1983
3:30 PM EST

Montreal Manic	4–5 (2OT)	Tampa Bay Rowdies
Mitchell (16:17); Mitchell (19:51); Mitchell (24:53); Lodeweges (44:01)	Report (p. 2C)	Tatu; Perez (11:12); Nogly (31:46); Zequinha; Karpun 69:28' (Nogly)

Montreal Forum, Montreal, Quebec, Montreal, Quebec
Attendance: 7,895
Referee: Gord Arrowsmith (Canada)

1983 Indoor Grand Prix Champions: Tampa Bay Rowdies

== Tournament awards ==
- Most Valuable Players:
  - Offensive: (England) Laurie Abrahams (Tulsa) - Goals: 12 Assists: 6 Total Pts: 30
  - Defensive: (Algeria) Mehdi Cerbah (Montreal) Goals-against-average: 4.36
- $5,000 Shootout Challenge:
  - Semi-finals: Tampa Bay 3 – 1 Tulsa • Fort Lauderdale 3 – 1 Montreal
  - Finals: Tampa Bay 2 – 0 Fort Lauderdale

== Final rankings ==
G = Games, W = Wins, L = Losses, GF = Goals For, GA = Goals Against, GD = Goal Differential

Pos	Team	G	W	L	GF	GA	GD
1	Tampa Bay Rowdies	8	6	2	51	41	+10
2	Montreal Manic	8	5	3	51	40	+11
3	Tulsa Roughnecks	8	4	4	48	49	-1
4	Fort Lauderdale Strikers	8	1	7	40	60	-20

=== Statistics ===
Leading scorers	Goals	Assists	Points
(England) Laurie Abrahams (Tulsa)	12	6	30
(Canada) Dale Mitchell (Montreal)	12	4	28
(Canada) Branko Šegota (Fort Lauderdale)	10	8	28
(Socialist Federal Republic of Yugoslavia) Dragan Vujović (Montreal)	9	7	25
(Peru) Teófilo Cubillas (Fort Lauderdale)	8	9	25
(United States) Hugo Pérez (Tampa Bay)	10	4	24
(Brazil) Tatu (Tampa Bay)	9	5	23
(England) Keith Weller (Tulsa)	8	7	23
(Canada) Wes McLeod (Tampa Bay)	5	12	22
(United States) Njego Pesa (Tulsa)	9	4	22
(England) Alan Willey (Montreal)	8	6	22
(South Africa) Steve Wegerle (Fort Lauderdale)	7	6	20

Leading Goalkeepers	Minutes	GA	GAA
(Algeria) Mehdi Cerbah (Montreal)	330	24	4.36
(Germany) Jürgen Stars (Tampa Bay)	377	32	5.09
(United States) Craig Scarpelli (Fort Lauderdale)	330	33	5.99
(United States) Winston DuBose (Tulsa)	486	49	6.05

== Non-grand prix matches ==
In addition to the Grand Prix tournament, the four teams took part in other indoor matches as tune-ups for both the outdoor season and the Grand Prix itself.

=== Match reports ===
January 14, 1983 1	Tea Men All-Stars	3–4	Fort Lauderdale Strikers	Jacksonville, Florida
	Zec	Report	Whelan, (59:22); Bolitho; Šegota	Stadium: Jacksonville Coliseum; Attendance: 5,000

January 15, 1983 2	Tulsa Roughnecks	3–6	Tampa Bay Rowdies	Dallas, Texas
	Belfiore; Danaeifard (36:17); Pesa (55:57)	Report p. 2-C	McLeod; Karpun (37:23); Zequinha; Van der Beck (42:30); McLeod (51:45); Pérez (56:33)	Stadium: Reunion Arena; Attendance: 5,451

January 18, 1983 3	Tulsa Roughnecks	3–5	Tampa Bay Rowdies	Oklahoma City, Oklahoma
	Saldana (21:07); Saldana (21:29); Saldana (52:00)	Report 1 (p. 5-C); Report 2	Nogly (18:08); Van der Beck (19:14); McLeod (Myernick); Karpun (Myernick); Roe	Stadium: Myriad Arena; Attendance: 2,500

January 29, 1983 4	Tampa Bay Rowdies	7–5	Montreal Manic	St. Petersburg, Florida
7:30 PM (EST)	Karpun (7:38); Tatu; Oliveira; Tatu (39:05); Pérez (40:28); Nogly (48:47); Van der Beck (58:37)	Report p. 2-C	Mitchell (18:46); Willey; Usiyan; Usiyan (39:40); Mitchell (40:40)	Stadium: Bayfront Center; Attendance: 5,525

February 25, 1983 5	Tampa Bay Rowdies	8–5	Fort Lauderdale Strikers	Lakeland, Florida
8:00 PM (EST)	Tatu; Karpun (13:04); Miller; Karpun (31:35); Gruber (44:42); Molina (46:43); Bates; Oliveira	Report p. 2-C	Kidd (13:26); Cubillas (23:55); Kidd (36:14); Meschbach; Kidd (54:16)	Stadium: Lakeland Civic Center; Attendance: 3,506
