= 1983 Fort Lauderdale Strikers season =

Fort Lauderdale Strikers
1983 season
- Owner: (United States) Elizabeth Robbie
- General manager: (United States) Tim Robbie
- Manager: (England) David Chadwick
- Stadium: Lockhart Stadium
- NASL: Southern Division: Second place Quarterfinalist
- Top goalscorer: League: (England) Brian Kidd (18 goals); All: (England) Brian Kidd (18 goals)
- Average home league attendance: 10,823
Home colors	Away colors

The 1983 Fort Lauderdale Strikers season was the seventh season of the Fort Lauderdale Striker's team, and the club's seventeenth season in professional soccer. This year the team made it to the quarterfinals of the North American Soccer League playoffs, where they lost to the Tulsa Roughnecks. It would be the last year of the club's incarnation as the Fort Lauderdale Strikers in the original NASL. The following year they relocated to Minnesota for the 1984 season and became the Minnesota Strikers.

== Competitions ==
=== NASL Playoffs ===
==== Quarterfinals ====
Higher seed		Lower seed	Game 1	Game 2	Game 3
Tulsa Roughnecks	-	Fort Lauderdale Strikers	3–2 (OT)	4–2	x	September 6 • Skelly Stadium • 7,826; September 10 • Lockhart Stadium • 8,873

==== Bracket ====
Quarterfinals
1	New York Cosmos	2	0(2)	–
8	Montreal Manic	4	1(3)	–
3	Tulsa Roughnecks	3	4	–
6	Fort Lauderdale Strikers	2	2	–
4	Golden Bay Earthquakes	6	0	5
5	Chicago Sting	1	1	2
2	Vancouver Whitecaps	1	3	0
7	Toronto Blizzard	0	4	1

Semifinals
8	Montreal Manic	1(8)	1	0
3	Tulsa Roughnecks	2(9)	0	3
3	Golden Bay Earthquakes	0(3)	0	–
7	Toronto Blizzard	1(5)	2	–

Soccer Bowl '83
3	Tulsa Roughnecks	2
7	Toronto Blizzard	0
