= Soccer Bowl '83 =

Soccer match

- Event: Soccer Bowl
Tulsa Roughnecks	Toronto Blizzard
2	0
- Date: October 1, 1983
- Venue: BC Place Stadium, Vancouver, British Columbia
- MVP: Njego Pesa (Tulsa Roughnecks)
- Referee: Ed Bellion (United States)
- Attendance: 53,326

Soccer Bowl '83 was the 17th edition of the Soccer Bowl, the championship match of North American Soccer League (NASL), which took place on October 1, 1983. It was the final match of the 1983 North American Soccer League playoffs and was contested by the Tulsa Roughnecks and the Toronto Blizzard at the Stadium at BC Place in Vancouver, British Columbia.

== Background ==
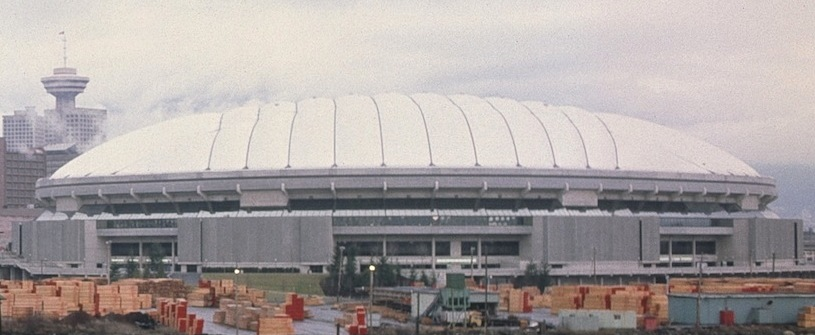
BC Place was the venue for Soccer Bowl '83

=== Tulsa Roughnecks ===
The Tulsa Roughnecks won the Southern Division with a 17–13 record and a total of 145 points. They dispatched the Fort Lauderdale Strikers in the quarterfinals with a two-game sweep. By virtue of their two games to one victory In the semifinals against the Montreal Manic, the Roughnecks advanced to the Soccer Bowl for the first time in franchise history.

=== Toronto Blizzard ===
The Toronto Blizzard qualified for the playoffs as a wild card by finishing third in the Eastern Division with a 16–14 record and a total of 135 points. In the quarterfinals they were the upset-winner over the Western Division champion Vancouver Whitecaps by two games to one. Vancouver had only lost 6 matches all season. The Blizzard pulled off a second upset in their semifinal match-up by sweeping the Golden Bay Earthquakes in two games, and earning their second ever trip to the Soccer Bowl.

=== Pre-match controversy ===
During game three of their semifinal series with Montreal, Tulsa forward Ron Futcher picked up his third yellow card of the playoffs. By rule this earned him a one-match suspension, and league director of operations Ted Howard was poised to enforce it. For his part, Futcher was not only the team's leading scorer, but also a leader in the Roughnecks' locker room. Tulsa's owners appealed the yellow card and even alluded to the press, the possibility of boycotting the final if Futcher was not allowed to play. Toronto team president Clive Toye felt that bending the rules for a star player might set a bad precedent, but was nevertheless prepared to face whatever lineup Tulsa put on the pitch. Ultimately, NASL president Howard J. Samuels overruled Ted Howard and decided to allow Futcher to play, because he felt that the fans in attendance would be the ones made to suffer by Futcher's absence.

== Match details ==
October 1, 1983
4:00 p.m. (PDT)

Tulsa Roughnecks	2–0	Toronto Blizzard
Pesa 56'; Futcher 62'	Report

BC Place Stadium, Vancouver
Attendance: 53,326
Referee: Ed Bellion (United States)

Tulsa Roughnecks	Toronto Blizzard

GK	0	(United States) Winston DuBose
DF	5	(United States) Val Fernandes
DF	2	(Canada) Terry Moore
DF	18	(Northern Ireland) Victor Moreland (c)
DF	3	(England) Barry Wallace
MF	17	(Poland) Adam Krupa	(substituted off) 56'
MF	9	(Iran) Iraj Danaifard
MF	20	(Canada) Ivan Belfiore	(substituted off) 56'
FW	6	(United States) Njego Pesa
FW	14	(England) Laurie Abrahams
FW	9	(England) Ron Futcher
Substitutes:
GK	22	(United States) Paul Coffee
MF	11	(Nigeria) Thompson Usiyan	(substituted on) 56'
MF	4	(England) Pasquale Fuccillo	(substituted on) 56'
FW	7	(Brazil) Zequinha
MF	10	(Republic of Ireland) Gerry Reardon
MF	13	(United States) Todd Saldana
Manager:
(Wales) Terry Hennessey

GK	1	(Sweden) Jan Möller
DF	3	(Canada) Bruce Wilson (c)	(yellow card) 52'
DF	4	(Sweden) Conny Karlsson
DF	17	(Scotland) Derek Spalding	(yellow card) 2'
DF	10	(England) Cliff Calvert
MF	16	(Canada) Randy Ragan
MF	8	(South Africa) Patrick Ntsoelengoe
MF	5	(Northern Ireland) Jimmy Nicholl
FW	19	(England) David Byrne
FW	11	(Italy) Roberto Bettega
FW	6	(South Africa) Neill Roberts	(substituted off) 81'
Substitutes:
GK	22	(Canada) Sven Habermann
MF	14	(South Africa) Geoff Wegerle	(substituted on) 81'
DF	7	(Canada) Victor Kodelja
DF	24	(Canada) Collin Miller
MF	12	(Canada) Pasquale de Luca
Manager:
(England) Bob Houghton

1983 NASL Champions: Tulsa Roughnecks

Soccer Bowl MVP:
Njego Pesa

Assistant referees:
(United States) Howard Krollfeifer
(United States) Gary Shugarts
Fourth official:
(Canada) Dave Roach
Reserve referee:
(United States) Bill Maxwell

Television: Budwieser Network (syndicated)
Announcers: Bob Carpenter, Gordon Bradley
Touchline reporter: Al Miller

== Match statistics ==
Statistic	Tulsa	Toronto
Goals scored	2	0
Total shots	11	14
Shots on target	4	3
Saves	3	2
Corner kicks	2	5
Fouls	19	19
Offsides	4	9
Yellow cards	0	2
Red cards	0	0

== See also ==
- 1983 North American Soccer League season
