= Tulsa Roughnecks =

Tulsa Roughnecks may refer to any of four distinct professional soccer teams:

- Tulsa Roughnecks (1978–1984), the original top-flight team that played in the North American Soccer League from 1978 to 1984.
- Tulsa Roughnecks (1993–2000), the team that played in United Soccer Leagues from 1993 to 1999.
- Tulsa Roughnecks (W-League), the team that played in the USL's W-League in 1995
- FC Tulsa, a USL pro team that began play in 2015 as Tulsa Roughnecks FC
