= 1982 Fort Lauderdale Strikers season =

Fort Lauderdale Strikers
1982 season
- Owner: (United States) Elizabeth Robbie
- General manager: (United States) Tim Robbie
- Manager: (Germany) Eckhard Krautzun (fired Sept. 23) (England) David Chadwick
- Stadium: Lockhart Stadium
- NASL: Southern Division: first place Semifinalist
- Top goalscorer: League: (England) Brian Kidd (15 goals); All: (England) Brian Kidd (16 goals)
- Average home league attendance: 12,345
Home colors	Away colors

The 1982 Fort Lauderdale Strikers season was the sixth season of the Fort Lauderdale Striker's team, and the club's sixteenth season in professional soccer. This year the team made it to semifinals of the North American Soccer League playoffs.

== Competitions ==
=== Sunshine International Series ===
The Sunshine International Series was the first international competition to use the NASL's point system to determine the standings. As such, teams were awarded six points for wins in regulation or overtime, four points for a shoot–out win, and up to three bonus points for each goal scored in regulation. All four teams faced one another with Fort Lauderdale hosting games on July 24 and 28. On the final day of the competition a double header was played at Tampa Stadium with all four teams in action, followed by a concert featuring country-pop crossover singer, Crystal Gayle. São Paulo FC won the series with a perfect record. The Strikers netted four goals and won one match, finishing third.

==== Series standings ====
SIS Teams	League	W	L	GF	GA	PTS
São Paulo FC	Série A	3	0	6	2	24
Ipswich Town F.C.	First Div.	2	1	4	2	15
Fort Lauderdale Strikers	NASL	1	2	4	4	10
Tampa Bay Rowdies	NASL	0	3	4	9	4

==== Series results ====
Date	Opponent	Venue	Result	Attendance	Scorers
July 24, 1982	São Paulo FC	Lockhart Stadium	1–2	5,887	Ray Hudson
July 28, 1982	Ipswich Town F.C.	Lockhart Stadium	0–1 (OT)	7,535	
July 31, 1982	Tampa Bay Rowdies	Tampa Stadium	1–3	21,220	Robert Meschbach, Bruce Miller, Edi Kirschner

=== NASL regular season ===
Regular season W = Wins, L = Losses, GF = Goals For, GA = Goals Against, PT= point system

6 points for a win in regulation and overtime, 4 point for a shootout win, 0 points for a loss, 1 bonus point for each regulation goal scored, up to three per game.

NASL Southern Division	W	L	GF	GA	PT
Fort Lauderdale Strikers	18	14	64	74	163
Tulsa Roughnecks	16	16	69	57	151
Tampa Bay Rowdies	12	20	47	77	112
Jacksonville Tea Men	11	21	41	71	105

=== NASL Playoffs ===
==== Quarterfinals ====
Higher seed		Lower seed	Game 1	Game 2	Game 3
Fort Lauderdale Strikers	-	Montreal Manic	*2–3 (OT)	1–0 (OT)	4–1	*August 25 • Olympic Stadium • 15,232; August 29 • Lockhart Stadium • 10,696; September 1 • Lockhart Stadium • 11,897

*Montreal Manic hosted Game 1 (instead of Game 2) due to stadium conflicts with the Expos baseball club.

==== Semifinals ====
Higher seed		Lower seed	Game 1	Game 2	Game 3
Seattle Sounders	-	Fort Lauderdale Strikers	2–0	3–4 (OT)	1–0 (OT)	September 4 • Kingdome • 17,338; September 8 • Lockhart Stadium • 15,196; September 10 • Kingdome • 28,986

==== Bracket ====
Quarterfinals
1	New York Cosmos	5	0	1
8	Tulsa Roughnecks	0	1	0
4	San Diego Sockers	5	0	2
5	Vancouver Whitecaps	1	1	1
3	Fort Lauderdale Strikers	2	1	4
6	Montreal Manic	3	0	1
2	Seattle Sounders	4	1	4
7	Toronto Blizzard	2	2	2

Semifinals
1	New York Cosmos	2	2	–
4	San Diego Sockers	1	1	–
3	Fort Lauderdale Strikers	0	4	0
2	Seattle Sounders	2	3	1

Soccer Bowl '83
1	New York Cosmos	1
2	Seattle Sounders	0
