= Roughnecks =

Roughnecks can refer to:

- Roughneck, those employed in the oil industry.
- Roughnecks (TV series), a 1990s BBC One programme about oil rig workers
- Roughnecks: Starship Troopers Chronicles, a CGI animation television series
- Calgary Roughnecks, a Canadian lacrosse team in the National Lacrosse League
- Houston Roughnecks (2020), an American football team in the XFL
- Houston Roughnecks (2024), an American football team in the United Football League
- Tulsa Roughnecks (1978–84), an American soccer team in the original North American Soccer League
- Tulsa Roughnecks (1993–2000), an American soccer team in the United Soccer Leagues
- Tulsa Roughnecks FC, an American soccer team in the United Soccer League Championship
