= Barry Wallace =

Barry Wallace may refer to:

- Barry Wallace, guitarist with The Fratellis, an indie rock band from Glasgow, Scotland
- Barry Wallace (footballer) (1959–2006), English football (soccer) defender
