= 9th Soccer Bowl =

The 9th Soccer Bowl may refer to:

- Soccer Bowl '78, the ninth championship game of the original North American Soccer League
- Soccer Bowl '83, the ninth championship game of the original North American Soccer League that used the "Soccer Bowl" moniker
