= Maricle =

Maricle is a surname. Notable people with the surname include:

- Allen Maricle (born 1962), American politician and communication specialist
- Jason Maricle, American soccer player
- Leona Maricle (1905–1988), American actress
- Sherrie Maricle (born 1963), American jazz drummer
