= Larry Dill =

Canadian soccer player (born 1963)

Personal information
- Date of birth: 17 April 1963 (age 63)
- Place of birth: Burnaby, British Columbia, Canada
- Positions: Midfielder; defender

Youth career
- Cliff Avenue United

Senior career*
Years	Team	Apps	(Gls)
1981–1982	Edmonton Drillers	28	(0)
1981–1982	Edmonton Drillers (indoor)	8	(1)
1983	Montreal Manic	9	(0)
- * Club domestic league appearances and goals

Larry Dill (born April 17, 1963) is a Canadian former professional soccer player who played as a defender, and later midfielder. He spent three seasons in the original North American Soccer League (NASL), as well as one season in the NASL Indoor league.

== Playing career ==
At the age of fifteen, Dill got the chance to play in England after impressing with several British Columbia youth select teams. He spent time training with Sheffield Wednesday and Rotherham United, both of the Football League Third Division. During his third year overseas, Dill was selected with the second overall pick of the 1981 North American Soccer League (NASL) draft by the Edmonton Drillers, just behind 1980 Hermann Trophy winner Joe Morrone Jr. He played 28 matches for the Drillers during the 1981 and 1982 seasons, switching from defender to midfielder during the latter. He also made eight appearances for Edmonton during the 1981–82 NASL Indoor season, scoring once as they finished first in the Northwest Division. He scored during a 6–3 loss to the Seattle Sounders at the Kingdome in December.

Dill signed with the Montreal Manic ahead of the 1983 season, playing in nine matches. Although the club upset the number-one seed New York Cosmos in the playoffs, the Manic folded after the season, and Dill was one of the 16 players made available in the dispersal draft among the 10 remaining franchises. However, he failed to join another team.
