= History of the Iran national football team =

History of the Iran national football team began with the team's first international match on 23 August 1941. The Iranian Football Federation was founded in 1920.

== History ==
=== Early years ===
The first match that Team Melli played was on 23 August 1941, away at Kabul in a 1–0 win against British India, while Iran's first FIFA international match was on 25 August 1941, away at Afghanistan. Iran won the Asian Cup three consecutive times (1968, 1972, 1976), to which the team has not been able to add since.

Iran Golden Generation Won the Asian Cup three consecutive times (1968, 1972, 1976) to which the team has not been able to add since.Iran's record of three consecutive championships still stands today. Among the key Iranian players in the late 1960s and early 1970s were Parviz Ghelichkhani and Ali Jabbari, who were among the Best Players in Asian history and the best Asian Players in the 1970s.

The Legendary Generation of Iran included players such as Parviz Ghelichkhani and Ali Jabbari, Ali Parvin, Nasser Hejazi, Gholamhossein Mazloumi, Homayoun Behzadi, and Hassan Roshan, which is one of the Best Generations in the History of Asian football.

Asian Games champion in 1974.

They advanced to the quarterfinals at the 1976 Summer Olympics.

Qualifying for the 1978 World Cup as the only representative from Asia and Oceania.

=== 1978 FIFA World Cup in Argentina ===
Additional information: 1978 FIFA World Cup qualification (AFC and OFC)
Additional information: 1978 FIFA World Cup – Group 4

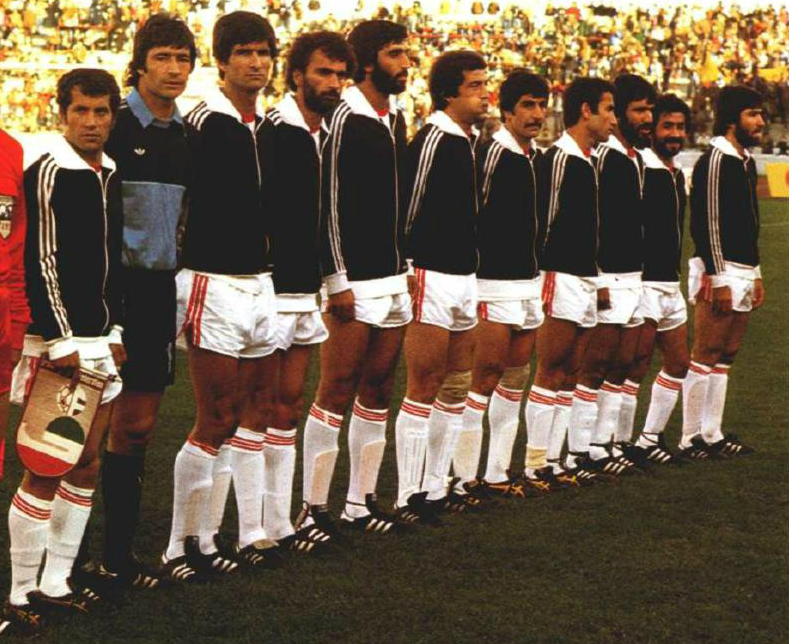
Iran's squad playing in '78 World Cup match against Scotland in Cordoba, Estadio Cordoba, Argentina on 7 June 1978 (16:45)

In 1978, Iran made its first appearance in the World Cup after defeating Australia in Tehran. Iran lost two of three group stage matches against the Netherlands and Peru. Team Melli managed to surprise the footballing community by securing one point in its first ever World Cup appearance against Scotland which saw Iraj Danaeifard cancel out an own goal scored by Andranik Eskandarian for the 1–1 draw.
