= Gene DuChateau =

American soccer player and coach

Personal information
- Full name: Eugene DuChateau
- Date of birth: January 23, 1954 (age 72)
- Place of birth: Queens, New York, United States
- Position: Goalkeeper

College career
| Years | Team | Apps | (Gls) |
| 1972–1976 | Adelphi University | | |

Senior career*
| Years | Team | Apps | (Gls) |
| 1976 | Hartford Bicentennials | 13 | (0) |
| 1977 | Connecticut Bicentennials | 18 | (0) |
| 1978 | Oakland Stompers | 5 | (0) |
| 1979 | Memphis Rogues | 3 | (0) |
| 1979–1980 | Tulsa Roughnecks | 35 | (0) |
| 1980–1981 | Tulsa Roughnecks (indoor) | 6 | (0) |
| 1980–1981 | Detroit Express (indoor) | 9 | (0) |

Managerial career
- 2005–: California Cougars (assistant)
- * Club domestic league appearances and goals

Eugene "Gene" DuChateau (born in Queens, New York) is a former U.S. soccer goalkeeper who spent six seasons in the North American Soccer League. He is an assistant coach with the California Cougars.

== College ==
DuChateau attended Adelphi University where he played on the men's Division II soccer team from 1972 to 1976. In 1973, DuChateau set an Adelphi record, which still stands, for most shutouts in a season (12). The next year, Adelphi won the Division II national championship over Seattle Pacific. In 1974, DuChateau was a second team Division II All American.

== NASL ==
The Hartford Bicentennials of the North American Soccer League (NASL) drafted DuChateau in the 1976 NASL College Draft. He spent the 1976 season in Hartford followed by the 1977 season with the team, now known as the Connecticut Bicentennials after they moved from Hartford to New Haven, Connecticut. The team moved again between the 1977 and 1978 season, this time across the country to Oakland, California where the team was renamed the Oakland Stompers. While DuChateau had played approximately half of his team's games in his first two seasons, the move to Oakland brought a sharp reduction in playing time. While he found little success on the field, the move to Oakland led to his meeting his wife, Laurie, who was a Stomper's cheerleader. When the team relocated again, this time to Edmonton, Alberta, Canada, DuChateau moved to a new team, the Memphis Rogues. However, only three games into the 1979 season, Memphis traded DuChateau to the Tulsa Roughnecks. He spent the remainder of the 1979 and the 1980 season in Tulsa, finally regaining his spot as his team's starting goalkeeper. The NASL ran an indoor schedule during the winter of 1980–1981. During that indoor season, the Roughnecks traded DuChateau to the Detroit Express. At this point, DuChateau was tired of the constant moving and decided to retire from playing and move back to northern California.

== Post-playing career ==
When DuChateau arrived in California, he found a job as a salesman for Qoxhi, a football betting outfit. Although his job was in sales, he also contributed to the company's handicapping of football games.

== Coaching ==
In 2005, Troy Dayak, then head coach of the California Cougars of the Major Indoor Soccer League (MISL) hired DuChateau as an assistant coach. When the Cougars fired Dayak, they elected to retain DuChateau.
