= Bruce Bates =

Canadian soccer player

Personal information
- Date of birth: June 13, 1960 (age 66)
- Place of birth: British Columbia, Canada
- Height: 1.79 m (5 ft 10 in)
- Position: Defender

Youth career
- 1980: Richmond Olympic

Senior career*
| Years | Team | Apps | (Gls) |
| 1981 | Calgary Boomers | 10 | (0) |
| 1982 | Tampa Bay Rowdies | 9 | (0) |
| 1983 | Tampa Bay Rowdies (indoor) | 4 | (1) |
| 1983 | Calgary Mustangs | | |
| 1985 | New Westminster Q.P.R. (PRSL) | | |
- * Club domestic league appearances and goals

Bruce Bates (born June 13, 1960) is a Canadian soccer player.

== Career ==
A native of the Vancouver area, Bates played amateur soccer locally for Richmond Olympic and briefly spent time as a reserve player for the Vancouver Whitecaps. At age 20, he joined the Calgary Boomers, on the NASL side. He appeared in ten matches that year, but the Boomers folded after one season. In 1982, he joined Calgary teammates Jürgen Stars and Tom Boric on the Tampa Bay Rowdies roster. He also played for the Rowdies during their run to the 1983 Indoor Grand Prix title.

Before the 1983 outdoor season began, he and Peter Gruber were dealt to Calgary Mustangs of the Canadian Professional Soccer League, where he was later named team captain. The CPSL folded after only one season.

In 1985, he played in the semi-pro Pacific Rim Soccer League for the New Westminster Queens Park Rangers along with other NASL alumni, Garry Ayre, Peter Stanley, and Carl Shearer. He and the Rangers won the season title with a 16-4-4 record, but fell, 3–0, to Vancouver Columbus in the PSRL President's Cup finals.

== Honours ==
- North American Soccer League
  - 1983 Indoor Grand Prix: Champion
- Pacific Rim Soccer League
  - 1985: Champion
  - 1985: President's Cup finalist
