= Carmelo D'Anzi =

Italian-American soccer player and coach (born 1956)

Personal information
- Date of birth: 24 November 1956 (age 69)
- Place of birth: Messina, Italy
- Height: 1.91 m (6 ft 3 in)
- Position: Forward

Youth career
- Papa Giovanni XXIII

Senior career*
Years	Team	Apps	(Gls)
1974–1977	Rhode Island Oceaneers	32	(18)
1977–1978	Francavilla di Sicilia	60	(21)
1978	Connecticut Yankees	18	(15)
1979–1981	New York United		
1981–1982	Cruz Azul	25	(20)
1982	Aquila		
1983	Tulsa Roughnecks	30	(17)

Managerial career
- Richardson Rockets
- Ceranova
- Dallas Texans
- 2010–2012: Wick
- * Club domestic league appearances and goals

Carmelo D'Anzi (born 24 November 1956) is an Italian-American football coach and former player.

Born in Messina, Italy, he began his career with the Papa Giovanni XXIII club in Providence. He played for Cruz Azul from 1981 to 1982. In 1983, he joined the Tulsa Roughnecks of the North American Soccer League where he won the league title in 1983 with the Tulsa Roughnecks.

He was inducted into the New England Soccer Hall of Fame in November 2006.

On 7 June 2010, D'Anzi was appointed manager of Wick in West Sussex, England.
