= Adam Krupa =

Polish footballer

Personal information
- Full name: Adam Krupa
- Date of birth: 18 December 1952 (age 73)
- Place of birth: Cieszyn, Poland
- Height: 1.76 m (5 ft 9 in)
- Position: Midfielder

Senior career*
Years	Team	Apps	(Gls)
- Piast Cieszyn
1971–1976	Polonia Bytom	133	(7)
1976–1977	Arka Gdynia	30	(1)
1978–1981	Polonia Bytom	55	(2)
1981–1984	Tulsa Roughnecks (indoors)	36	(15)
1982–1984	Tulsa Roughnecks	51	(5)
1985–1986	Chicago Sting	10	(0)

International career
- Poland U23
- * Club domestic league appearances and goals

Adam Krupa (born 18 December 1952) is a Polish former professional footballer who played as a midfielder.

== Career ==
Adam Krupa began his footballing career in his hometown with Piast Cieszyn. In 1971 he moved to Polonia Bytom, of Poland's premier league, the Ekstraklasa. Krupa then played briefly for Arka Gdynia, before returning to Polonia Bytom in 1978. In total he made over 200 appearances in the Ekstraklasa, scoring 10 goals. He also played at the international level for Poland's U23 squad.

In 1981 he moved to the United States and joined the Tulsa Roughnecks of the North American Soccer League. He was a starter in Soccer Bowl '83 on the Roughnecks' only championship winning team. Krupa also played indoor soccer for Tulsa from 1981 to 1984. After the NASL folded in 1985, he signed with the Chicago Sting of the Major Indoor Soccer League during the 1985–86 season where he appeared in 10 games.

== Honors ==
Tulsa Roughnecks

- Soccer Bowl: 1983
