= Gerry Reardon =

Irish footballer

Personal information
- Date of birth: 7 October 1960 (age 66)
- Place of birth: London, England
- Position: Midfielder

Youth career
- 1979–1982: Adelphi Panthers

Senior career*
Years	Team	Apps	(Gls)
1983	Tulsa Roughnecks	24	(1)
1983–1984	Tulsa Roughnecks (indoor)	28	(2)
1984	New York Cosmos	1	
- * Club domestic league appearances and goals

Gerry Reardon is an Irish retired football midfielder who played professionally in the North American Soccer League.

== Career ==
Reardon attended Adelphi University, where he was a 1979 First Team and 1980 Third Team All American soccer player. He is a member of the Adelphi Athletic Hall of Fame.

In December 1982, the Tulsa Roughnecks selected Reardon in the second round of the North American Soccer League draft. He was part of the Tulsa team which went on to win the 1983 Soccer Bowl. He then played the entire 1983–1984 NASL indoor season with the Roughnecks before moving to the New York Cosmos for the 1984 season.

He works for the FAI.
