= 1983 North American Soccer League season =

Soccer league season

North American Soccer League 1983 season
- Season: 1983
- Teams: 12
- Champions: Tulsa Roughnecks
- Premiers: New York Cosmos (7th title) most total points *Vancouver best Won/Loss record
- Matches: 180
- Goals: 708 (3.93 per match)
- Top goalscorer: (Paraguay) Roberto Cabañas (25 goals)
- Highest attendance: 60,342; Seattle at Vancouver (June 20)
- Lowest attendance: 3,079; Toronto at San Diego (May 25)
- Average attendance: 13,258

Statistics of North American Soccer League in season 1983. This was the 16th and penultimate season of the NASL.

== Overview ==
There were 12 teams in the league. The Tulsa Roughnecks won the championship. Though Vancouver won two more games than any other club, for the fourth time in league history, the team with the most wins did not win the regular season due to the NASL's system of awarding points.

== Changes from the previous season ==
=== New teams ===
- Team America

=== Teams folding ===
- Edmonton Drillers
- Jacksonville Tea Men
- Portland Timbers

=== Teams moving ===
- None

=== Name changes ===
- San Jose to Golden Bay

== Map of clubs ==
Eastern Division Southern Division Western Division

== Regular season ==
W = Wins, L = Losses, GF = Goals For, GA = Goals Against, PT= point system

6 points for a win in regulation and overtime, 4 point for a shootout win, 0 points for a loss, 1 bonus point for each regulation goal scored, up to three per game.

-Premiers (most points). -Best record. -Other playoff teams.

Eastern Division	W	L	GF	GA	PT
New York Cosmos ^{(1)}	22	8	87	49	194
Chicago Sting ^{(5)}	15	15	66	73	147
Toronto Blizzard ^{(7)}	16	14	51	48	135
Montreal Manic ^{(8)}	12	18	58	71	124

Southern Division	W	L	GF	GA	PT
Tulsa Roughnecks ^{(3)}	17	13	56	49	145
Fort Lauderdale Strikers ^{(6)}	14	16	60	63	136
Tampa Bay Rowdies	7	23	48	87	83
Team America	10	20	33	54	79

Western Division	W	L	GF	GA	PT
Vancouver Whitecaps ^{(2)}	24	6	63	34	187
Golden Bay Earthquakes ^{(4)}	20	10	71	54	169
Seattle Sounders	12	18	62	61	119
San Diego Sockers	11	19	53	65	106

== NASL All-Stars ==
First Team	Position	Second Team	Honorable Mention
(Netherlands) Jan van Beveren, Fort Lauderdale	G	(Canada) Tino Lettieri, Vancouver	(Germany) Hubert Birkenmeier, New York
(England) David Watson, Vancouver	D	(England) Ray Evans, Seattle	(United States) Gregg Thompson, Tampa Bay
(Germany) Franz Beckenbauer, New York	D	(Canada) Bruce Wilson, Toronto	(Jersey) Dave Huson, Chicago
(Iran) Andranik Eskandarian, New York	D	(Haiti) Frantz Mathieu, Montreal	(Socialist Federal Republic of Yugoslavia) Mihalj Keri, Golden Bay
(England) Barry Wallace, Tulsa	D	(South Korea) Cho Young-Jeung, Chicago	(Canada) Bruce Miller, Fort Lauderdale
(Socialist Federal Republic of Yugoslavia) Vladislav Bogićević, New York	M	(Germany) Karl-Heinz Granitza, Chicago	(Republic of Ireland) Fran O'Brien, Vancouver
(Poland) Stan Terlecki, Golden Bay	M	(England) Steve Daley, Seattle	(United States) Rick Davis, New York
(Netherlands) Frans Thijssen, Vancouver	M	(Poland) Kaz Deyna, San Diego	(England) Ray Hudson, Fort Lauderdale
(Paraguay) Roberto Cabañas, New York	F	(Italy) Giorgio Chinaglia, New York	(England) David Cross, Vancouver
(Socialist Federal Republic of Yugoslavia) Steve Zungul, Golden Bay	F	(Argentina) Ricardo Alonso, Chicago	(England) Peter Ward, Seattle
(Argentina) Pato Margetic, Chicago	F	(South Africa) David Byrne, Toronto	(England) Peter Beardsley, Vancouver

== Playoffs ==
=== Bracket ===
Quarterfinals (Best-of-3)
1	New York Cosmos	2	0(2)	–
8	Montreal Manic	4	1(3)	–
3	Tulsa Roughnecks	3	4	–
6	Fort Lauderdale Strikers	2	2	–
4	Golden Bay Earthquakes	6	0	5
5	Chicago Sting	1	1	2
2	Vancouver Whitecaps	1	3	0
7	Toronto Blizzard	0	4	1

Semifinals (Best-of-3)
8	Montreal Manic	1(8)	1	0
3	Tulsa Roughnecks	2(9)	0	3
4	Golden Bay Earthquakes	0(3)	0	–
7	Toronto Blizzard	1(5)	2	–

Soccer Bowl '83 (Single match)
3	Tulsa Roughnecks	2
7	Toronto Blizzard	0

=== Quarterfinals ===
Higher seed		Lower seed	Game 1	Game 2	Game 3	*(higher seed hosts Games 1 and 3)
New York Cosmos	-	Montreal Manic	2–4	0–1 (SO, 2–3)	x	September 6 • Giants Stadium • 17,202; September 12 • Olympic Stadium • 20,726
Tulsa Roughnecks	-	Fort Lauderdale Strikers	3–2 (OT)	4–2	x	September 6 • Skelly Stadium • 7,826; September 10 • Lockhart Stadium • 8,873
Golden Bay Earthquakes	-	Chicago Sting	6–1	0–1	5–2	September 7 • Spartan Stadium • 16,572; September 12 • Soldier Field • 5,852; September 14 • Spartan Stadium • 17,361
Vancouver Whitecaps	-	Toronto Blizzard	1–0	3–4	0–1	September 8 • BC Place Stadium • 22,015; September 12 • Exhibition Stadium • 7,958; September 15 • BC Place Stadium • 24,545

=== Semifinals ===
Higher seed		Lower seed	Game 1	Game 2	Game 3	*(higher seed hosts Games 1 and 3)
Tulsa Roughnecks	-	Montreal Manic	2–1 (SO, 9–8)	0–1	3–0	September 18 • Skelly Stadium • 10,625; September 26 • Olympic Stadium • 16,185; September 28 • Skelly Stadium • 18,090
Golden Bay Earthquakes	-	Toronto Blizzard	0–1 (SO, 3–5)	0–2	x	September 17 • Spartan Stadium • 19,027; September 22 • Exhibition Stadium • 15,556

=== Soccer Bowl '83 ===
October 1
16:00 (PDT)

Tulsa Roughnecks	2–0	Toronto Blizzard
Pesa; Futcher	Report

BC Place Stadium, Vancouver
Attendance: 53,326
Referee: Ed Bellion (USA)

1983 NASL Champions: Tulsa Roughnecks

== Post season awards ==
- Most Valuable Player: (Paraguay) Roberto Cabanas, New York
- Coach of the year: (Socialist Federal Republic of Yugoslavia) Don Popovic, Golden Bay
- Rookie of the year: (United States) Gregg Thompson, Tampa Bay
- North American Player of the Year: (Canada) Tino Lettieri, Vancouver
- Soccer Bowl MVP: (United States) Njego Pesa, Tulsa

== Attendances ==
Club	Games	Total	Average
Vancouver Whitecaps	15	437,454	29,164
New York Cosmos	15	408,635	27,242
Team America	15	195,032	13,002
Tulsa Roughnecks	15	186,229	12,415
Golden Bay Earthquakes	15	178,999	11,933
Toronto Blizzard	15	174,457	11,630
Tampa Bay Rowdies	15	167,575	11,172
Chicago Sting	15	164,061	10,937
Ft. Lauderdale Strikers	15	162,430	10,829
Seattle Sounders	15	122,721	8,181
Montreal Manic	15	118,650	7,910
San Diego Sockers	15	70,268	4,685
