= Barry Wallace (footballer) =

English footballer (1959-2006)

Personal information
- Full name: Barry Daniel Wallace
- Date of birth: 17 April 1959
- Place of birth: London, England
- Date of death: 17 October 2006 (aged 47)
- Place of death: Lenexa, Kansas, United States
- Position: Midfielder

Youth career
- 1975–1977: Queens Park Rangers

Senior career*
Years	Team	Apps	(Gls)
1977–1980	Queens Park Rangers	25	(0)
1980–1984	Tulsa Roughnecks	128	(18)
1980–1981	Tulsa Roughnecks (indoor)	16	(13)
1984	Minnesota Strikers	4	(0)
1984–1985	Minnesota Strikers (indoor)	16	(5)
1985–1987	Wichita Wings (indoor)	94	(45)
1987–1988	Kansas City Comets (indoor)	54	(29)
1988	Fort Lauderdale Strikers		
1989	Kansas City Comets (indoor)	24	(12)
1989	Tulsa Renegades		
1989	Tacoma Stars (indoor)	10	(0)
1989–1990	Kansas City Comets (indoor)	29	(9)
1991	Tulsa Renegades (indoor)		
1991–1992	Tulsa Ambush (indoor)	19	(12)
1993–1994	Tulsa Roughnecks (indoor)		
1994	Wichita Wings (indoor)	2	(0)
1995–1996	Tulsa Roughnecks (indoor)		
1996	Tulsa Roughnecks		
- * Club domestic league appearances and goals

Barry Daniel Wallace (17 April 1959 – 17 October 2006) was an English football midfielder who played professionally in the Football League, North American Soccer League and Major Indoor Soccer League. After his retirement from playing, Wallace spent the rest of his life coaching youth soccer teams.

== Playing career ==
In 1975, Wallace signed with Queens Park Rangers at the age of sixteen. He spent two seasons in the QPR youth system before graduating to the first team in 1977. He played twenty-five first team games over three seasons. In 1980, he moved to the United States to sign with the Tulsa Roughnecks of the North American Soccer League. He remained with the Roughnecks until traded to the Minnesota Strikers during the 1984 season. Wallace was named to four all-NASL teams, including the 1983 Best XI. In Soccer Bowl '83 he assisted on the game-winning goal by Njego Pesa. He finished the 1984 outdoor season with the Strikers, then began the 1984–1985 indoor season in Minnesota before being sent to the Wichita Wings in January 1985. On 20 October 1987, Wallace signed as a free agent with the Kansas City Comets. In June 1988, Wallace returned to outdoor soccer with the Fort Lauderdale Strikers of the American Soccer League. He rejoined the Comets as a free agent in January 1989. In June 1989, he moved to the Tulsa Renegades of the Southwest Outdoor Soccer League. At the time, Wallace lived in Tulsa. In July 1989, Wallace signed as a free agent with the Tacoma Stars of MISL. He joined the team at the end of the SOSL playoffs in August. On 23 December 1989, the Stars traded Wallace to the Kansas City Comets in exchange for Kia and Gerry Gray. The Comets released Wallace at the end of the season. In January 1991, he signed with the Tulsa Renegades which were in the midst of the 1990–91 Sunbelt Independent Soccer League season. In December 1991, he moved to the Tulsa Ambush of the National Professional Soccer League. In 1993, he played for the Tulsa Roughnecks in the USISL. In December 1994, the Wichita Wings signed Wallace to a short-term contract after the team was decimated by injuries. In 1995, he returned to the Tulsa Roughnecks. He finished his professional career with the Roughnecks during the 1996 USISL outdoor season.

== Personal life and death ==
Wallace was born in London in 1959 to James and Violet Wallace. He had one brother four sisters. In early September 2006 Wallace learned he had terminal cancer and died in Kansas in mid-October. He left behind his wife Krisiti, son Daniel, daughter Sophie, and step-daughters Stephanie, Stacie and Sydnie.
