= Joe Morrone Jr. =

American soccer player (born 1959)

Joe Morrone (NOT Joe Morrone Jr. - that is his father Joseph J. Morrone Jr.)
Personal information
- Full name: Joseph M. Morrone
- Date of birth: March 19, 1959 (age 67)
- Place of birth: Middlebury, Vermont, U.S.
- Position: Midfielder

College career
Years	Team	Apps	(Gls)
1977–1980	UConn Huskies		

Senior career*
Years	Team	Apps	(Gls)
1980–1982	Tulsa Roughnecks (indoor)	28	(11)
1981–1982	Tulsa Roughnecks	35	(9)
1982	San Jose Earthquakes	12	(0)
1982–1983	Golden Bay Earthquakes (indoor)	30	(0)
1983–1984	Pittsburgh Spirit (indoor)	34	(10)
- * Club domestic league appearances and goals

Joseph M. Morrone (sometimes called Joe Jr. in error) (March 19, 1959 – May 10, 2026) is a former U.S. soccer midfielder who is the son of soccer coach Joseph J. Morrone Jr. While playing for the UConn Huskies, he won the 1980 Hermann Trophy as the top collegiate player of the year and the 1981 North American Soccer League Rookie of the Year. At the time, Morrone was the most decorated athlete in the University of Connecticut's history.

== Sports career ==
Morrone played soccer at E. O. Smith High School, where he was All-American and State Champion in 1976 and 1977. His father was UConn soccer coach Joseph J. Morrone Jr. Morrone attended the University of Connecticut from 1977 to 1980 where he starred on his father's team. In 1980, he capped his four years at the school with first team All American honors and the Hermann Trophy as the best college player that year. He finished his career at UConn with 158 points on 61 goals and 36 assists.

In 1980, Morrone joined the U.S. Olympic team as it began qualification for the 1980 Moscow Summer Olympics. Morrone scored two winning goals for the U.S. team in a 2–1 victory over Suriname and a 1–0 victory over Costa Rica. The U.S. finished tops in qualification but did not get to play because President Jimmy Carter boycotted the games after the Soviet Union invaded Afghanistan.

Morrone was drafted with the first selection of the 1980 draft by the Tulsa Roughnecks of the North American Soccer League. He garnered Rookie of the Year honors in 1981. He played the 1981 and part of the 1982 season with Tulsa. He also appeared in 18 indoor games for them between 1980 and 1982. In May 1982 the Roughnecks traded Morrone to the San Jose Earthquakes in exchange for Todd Saldana and two draft choices.

Morrone played the 1982 NASL and the 1982–1983 Major Indoor Soccer League season with the Earthquakes. He then signed with the Pittsburgh Spirit. He unexpectedly retired on March 5, 1984, stating he was burned out on soccer and wished to complete his business degree.
