= Alex Skotarek =

Personal information
- Full name: Alexander Skotarek
- Date of birth: April 2, 1949 (age 77)
- Place of birth: Sindelfingen, Germany
- Position: Defender

College career
Years	Team	Apps	(Gls)
1968	Michigan State Spartans		

Senior career*
Years	Team	Apps	(Gls)
1971–1972	MVV Maastricht	14	(1)
1973–1975	Diepenbeek VV	53	(8)
1975–1977	Chicago Sting	66	(2)
1978–1981	Tulsa Roughnecks	68	(0)
1979–1980	Tulsa Roughnecks (indoor)	12	(1)

International career
1975–1976	United States	10	(0)

Managerial career
- 1978: Tulsa Roughnecks
- * Club domestic league appearances and goals

Alexander Skotarek (born April 2, 1949) is a retired German American soccer defender. He played in both Europe and the North American Soccer League during the 1970s and early 1980s. He also earned ten caps with the U.S. national team in 1975 and 1976. His parents are from Poland.

== Player ==
=== College ===
Skotarek attended Michigan State University where he played on the men's soccer team. He is tied for seventh on Michigan State's season assists list with nine in 1968. That season, Michigan State and Maryland were declared co-champions in the NCAA Men's Soccer Championship after the game remained tied at 2–2 after two overtimes.

=== Club career ===
Following college, Skotarek pursued a professional career in Europe. He spent at least the 1971 and 1972 seasons with Dutch First Division club MVV Maastricht. Prior to the 1973 season, he was transferred from MVV to a Belgian club from Diepenbeek.

In 1975, he returned to the U.S. and signed with the Chicago Sting of the North American Soccer League (NASL). He spent three seasons in Chicago before being traded to the Tulsa Roughnecks. He then played with the Roughnecks from 1978 through 1981. However, in 1981, he saw time in only one game and retired from playing professional soccer.

=== National team ===
Skotarek played ten times for the U.S. national team in 1975 and 1976. Skotarek's first game with the national team came on August 19, 1975, in a 3–1 loss to Mexico. He played one more game that year, another loss to Mexico six days later. His next eight games all came in 1976, five of them were first-round qualification games for the 1978 FIFA World Cup. However, the U.S. was eliminated after losing 3–0 to Canada in a tiebreaker game played in Haiti. Skotarek was also on the Team America roster for the USA Bicentennial Cup which pitted a mixture of U.S. national team players and NASL stars against the national teams of England, Brazil and Italy.

== Coach and general manager ==
In 1978, Skotarek was the interim head coach of the Tulsa Roughnecks during part of its inaugural season. In July 1982, he became the team's general manager.
