= Jason Maricle =

American soccer player

Personal information
- Place of birth: United States
- Positions: Forward; midfielder

College career
Years	Team	Apps	(Gls)
1988–1991	Lees–McRae Bobcats		

Senior career*
Years	Team	Apps	(Gls)
1992–1993	Dayton Dynamo (indoor)	36	(14)
1993–1994	Tulsa Roughnecks (indoor)	12	(18)
1994	Tulsa Roughnecks		
1994–1995	Dayton Dynamo (indoor)	33	(15)
1995	Cincinnati Silverbacks (indoor)	7	(2)
1995–1996	Baltimore Spirit (indoor)	29	(13)
1996–1998	Tulsa Roughnecks		
- * Club domestic league appearances and goals

Jason Maricle is an American retired soccer player who played professionally in the USISL and National Professional Soccer League.

Maricle attended Lees–McRae College where he was a 1990 NJCAA Honorable Mention All American soccer player. In 1992, he turned professional with the Dayton Dynamo of the National Professional Soccer League. In 1993, Maricle moved to the Tulsa Roughnecks for the 1993–94 USISL indoor season. Maricle was the fourth leading scorer in the USISL that season. Maricle continued to play for Tulsa during the 1995 USISL outdoor season. In the fall of 1994, he rejoined the Dayton Dynamo. In 1995, the Dynamo moved to Cincinnati, Ohio and became the Cincinnati Silverbacks. On November 20, 1995, the Silverbacks sold Maricle's contract to the Baltimore Spirit. During the summer of 1996, Maricle left the Spirit to move to Tulsa where he worked for a vinyl sign business. When he arrived in Tulsa, Maricle signed with the Roughnecks and played for them in his spare time until 1998.
