= Paul Coffee =

American soccer player

Personal information
- Date of birth: November 12, 1956 (age 69)
- Place of birth: Santa Clara, California, U.S.
- Position: Goalkeeper

College career
Years	Team	Apps	(Gls)
1976–1979	San Jose State Spartans		

Senior career*
Years	Team	Apps	(Gls)
1979–1981	Chicago Sting	31	(0)
1980–1981	Chicago Sting (indoor)	10	(0)
1981–1982	Philadelphia Fever (indoor)	32	(0)
1982–1983	Chicago Sting (indoor)	12	(0)
1983–1984	Tulsa Roughnecks (indoor)	10	(0)
- * Club domestic league appearances and goals

Paul Coffee is an American retired soccer goalkeeper who played professionally in the North American Soccer League and Major Indoor Soccer League.

Coffee played soccer at San Jose State University. In 1979, he signed as an amateur with the Chicago Sting of the North American Soccer League in order to maintain his Olympic eligibility. In 1980, he was selected for the U.S. Olympic soccer team, which had qualified for the 1980 Summer Olympics. He did not compete when President Carter declared that the U.S. would boycott the Olympics, held in Moscow, after the Soviet Union invaded Afghanistan. Coffee turned professional with the Sting and remained with them until 1981, playing three outdoor and one NASL indoor seasons. In 1980, he signed with the Philadelphia Fever of the Major Indoor Soccer League before returning to the Sting, now playing in the MISL for the 1982–1983 season. He finished his career with the Tulsa Roughnecks during the 1983–1984 NASL indoor season.
