= Val Fernandes =

Brazilian-American soccer player

Personal information
- Date of birth: March 24, 1958 (age 68)
- Place of birth: São Paulo, Brazil
- Positions: Midfielder; defender

College career
Years	Team	Apps	(Gls)
1977–1980	Azusa Pacific University		

Senior career*
Years	Team	Apps	(Gls)
1981	California Surf	2	(0)
1983	San Diego Sockers	1	(0)
1983–1984	Tulsa Roughnecks	43	(0)
1983–1984	Tulsa Roughnecks (indoor)	32	(1)
1984–1985	Chicago Sting (indoor)	43	(8)
1985–1986	Los Angeles Lazers (indoor)	20	(6)
1989	California Kickers		
- * Club domestic league appearances and goals

Val Fernandes is a retired Brazilian-American soccer defender who played professionally in the North American Soccer League, Major Indoor Soccer League and Western Soccer League.

Fernandes attended Azusa Pacific University, playing on the men's soccer team from 1977 to 1980. He was inducted in the school's Athletic Hall of Fame in 1992. In 1981, Fernandes played two games for the California Surf before being released. He spent a year not playing, then was signed by the San Diego Sockers in 1983. He played only one game before being waived, but was picked up by the Tulsa Roughnecks and won the 1983 NASL championship with them. In 1984, he moved to the Major Indoor Soccer League where he played two seasons, one with the Chicago Sting and the other with the Los Angeles Lazers. In 1989, he played for the California Kickers of the Western Soccer Alliance.
