= Laurie Abrahams =

English football player and coach (1953–2026)

Personal information
- Full name: Lawrence Adam Michael Abrahams
- Date of birth: 3 April 1953
- Place of birth: Stepney, London, England
- Date of death: 12 April 2026 (aged 73)
- Position: Forward

Senior career*
Years	Team	Apps	(Gls)
- Alford
–1977	Barking		
1977–1978	Charlton Athletic	16	(2)
1978	New England Tea Men	17	(7)
1979	Tulsa Roughnecks	15	(10)
1979–1981	California Surf	58	(30)
1980–1981	California Surf (indoor)	14	(14)
1982–1983	Tulsa Roughnecks	53	(28)
1983–1984	Tulsa Roughnecks (indoor)	25	(23)
1984	San Diego Sockers	19	(1)
1984–1985	New York Cosmos (indoor)	18	(7)
1985–1986	Kansas City Comets (indoor)	55	(38)
1986	Melbourne Croatia	9	(5)
1986–1987	Wichita Wings (indoor)	23	(14)
Total		283	(142)
- * Club domestic league appearances and goals

Lawrence Adam Michael Abrahams (3 April 1953 – 12 April 2026) was an English professional football player and coach who played as a forward in England, the United States, and Australia. From 1977 to 1987, Abrahams played 283 career league games, and scored 142 league goals.

== Playing career ==
Abrahams was born in Stepney, in the East End of London. His family moved to Alfold in Surrey and he started his football career in the youth team at Alfold F.C., (once scoring 101 goals in a single season). He returned to London. He joined non-league club Barking, also working in a tailor's shop. He signed a professional contract in 1977 with Charlton Athletic. He spent one season at Charlton, making sixteen appearances. After leaving Charlton in 1978, Abrahams moved to the United States and played in the North American Soccer League for the New England Tea Men, Tulsa Roughnecks, and California Surf. The Surf folded at the end of the 1981 season and on 6 October 1981, the Tulsa Roughnecks selected Abrahams in the Dispersal Draft. He played the 1982 and 1983 outdoor seasons in Tulsa followed by the 1983–84 NASL indoor season. He was the Offensive MVP of 1983 NASL Grand Prix of Indoor Soccer, posting 12 goals and 6 assists in 8 games. In May 1984, the Roughnecks traded Abrahams to the San Diego Sockers in exchange for Peter Skouras and two used soccer balls. He began the season paired with Ade Coker up front. Still, he was relegated to the bench after the Sockers acquired Steve Zungul and Branko Segota. On 17 October 1984, the Sockers sold Abrahams's rights to the New York Cosmos for $25,000. The Cosmos entered the Major Indoor Soccer League in the fall of 1984, but sold his contract to the Kansas City Comets in January 1985. He remained with the Comets through the 1985–86 season. Abrahams spent the 1986 season in Australia with the Melbourne Knights, where he made 9 appearances, before returning to America to play with the Wichita Wings during the 1986–87 MISL season.

== Coaching career ==
Abrahams worked as the Assistant Soccer Coach at Irvine Valley College. He also worked at Santa Ana College.

== Death ==
Abrahams died on 12 April 2026, at the age of 73.
