= Victor Moreland =

Northern Irish footballer (born 1957)

Vic Moreland
Personal information
- Date of birth: 15 June 1957 (age 69)
- Place of birth: Belfast, Northern Ireland
- Positions: Midfielder; defender

Senior career*
Years	Team	Apps	(Gls)
1973–1978	Glentoran	159	(27)
1978	→ Tulsa Roughnecks (loan)	28	(0)
1978–1980	Derby County	42	(1)
1980–1984	Tulsa Roughnecks	136	(14)
1980–1981	Tulsa Roughnecks (indoor)	18	(7)
1984–1985	Chicago Sting (indoor)	38	(11)
1985–1988	Dallas Sidekicks (indoor)	144	(27)
1988–1991	Wichita Wings (indoor)	125	(20)
1989–1991	Fort Lauderdale Strikers		
1991–1992	Tulsa Ambush (indoor)		
1994–1996	Tulsa Roughnecks		

International career
1978	Northern Ireland U21	1	(0)
1978–1979	Northern Ireland	6	(1)

Managerial career
- 1990–1991: Fort Lauderdale Strikers (assistant)
- 1991–1992: Tulsa Ambush
- 1995–1996: Tulsa Roughnecks
- * Club domestic league appearances and goals

Victor Moreland (born 15 June 1957) is a retired professional footballer from Northern Ireland who began his career in Northern Ireland, spent two seasons in the Football League before moving to the United States. He then played six seasons in the North American Soccer League, seven in the Major Indoor Soccer League as well as several seasons in several lower division indoor and outdoor leagues.

== Club career ==
Born in Belfast, Moreland began his career as a midfielder with Glentoran in 1973. In 1978, Glentoran sent him on loan to the Tulsa Roughnecks of the North American Soccer League. He returned to Ireland and began the 1978–79 season with them before Glentoran sold him and Billy Caskey to Derby County for £90,000 in September 1978. He played two seasons with Derby before the team sold his contract, along with Caskey's to the Tulsa Roughnecks for $100,000 in 1980.

The NASL ran an indoor season during the 1980–81 winter. Up to this time, Moreland had played as a defensive midfielder, but beginning with the 1981 NASL outdoor season, he moved permanently to the backline. In 1984, he was named to the All League Second Team. In the fall of 1984, he moved to the Chicago Sting of the Major Indoor Soccer League. On 18 September 1985, the Sting sold his contract to the Dallas Sidekicks. On 15 June 1988, the Sidekicks released him to reduce the team's player salaries. He signed with the Wichita Wings on 1 July 1988.

In June 1989, he returned to outdoor soccer with the Fort Lauderdale Strikers of the American Soccer League. That year, the Strikers won the league title, then defeated the San Diego Nomads of the Western Soccer League for the first national outdoor championship since the demise of the NASL in 1984. On 18 June 1989, the Cleveland Crunch selected Moreland in the MISL expansion draft. However, he refused to sign with Cleveland and the Crunch allowed him to sign with the Wings in September 1989 in return for an undisclosed amount of cash and the Wing's first round selection in the 1990 MISL Draft. He remained with the Wings until the spring of 1991. In the summer of 1990 and 1991, he played for the Strikers, this time also adding duties as an assistant coach.

In August 1991, he was named as a player-coach with the Tulsa Ambush in the National Professional Soccer League. Moreland retired in 1992. He came out of retirement in November 1994, to play for the Tulsa Roughnecks in the 1994–95 USISL indoor season. He continued to play for the Roughnecks during the 1995 USISL outdoor season, then became the head coach of the Roughnecks for the 1995–96 indoor season. He remained with the team until the start of the 1996 outdoor season, when he stepped down as coach. He continued to play sporadically for the Roughnecks into the 1997–98 indoor season, filling in whenever injuries caught the team shorthanded. He founded, and continues to run, the Tulsa Nationals Soccer Academy in 1995.

== International career ==
In March 1978, Moreland played one game with the Northern Ireland U-21 team. On 29 November 1978, he earned his first of six caps with the Northern Ireland national team against Bulgaria. He scored his only goal with the national team in a 5–1 loss to England on 17 October 1979. His last international game came a month later when Northern Ireland defeated Ireland on 21 November 1979.
