= Billy Caskey =

Northern Irish footballer (born 1954)

Personal information
- Full name: William Thomas Caskey
- Date of birth: 12 October 1953 (age 73)
- Place of birth: Belfast, Northern Ireland
- Positions: Forward; midfielder

Senior career*
Years	Team	Apps	(Gls)
1972–1974	Crusaders		
1974	East Belfast		
1974–1978	Glentoran	79	(36)
1978	→ Tulsa Roughnecks (loan)	27	(11)
1978–1980	Derby County	28	(3)
1980–1984	Tulsa Roughnecks	128	(22)
1979–1983	Tulsa Roughnecks (indoor)	42	(31)
1984–1985	Glentoran	24	(5)
1985	Tulsa Roughnecks (exhibition)		
1985–1986	Dallas Sidekicks (indoor)	42	(26)
1986–1993	Glentoran	236	(51)
1994–1996	Dundela		(10)
- Abbey Villa

International career
1978–1982	Northern Ireland	7	(1)
- * Club domestic league appearances and goals

William Thomas Caskey (born 10 December 1954) is a retired professional football midfielder from Northern Ireland. He played in the Irish Football League, Football League, North American Soccer League and Major Indoor Soccer League. He also earned seven caps, scoring one goal, with the Northern Ireland national team between 1978 and 1982.

== Club career ==
Born in Belfast, Caskey began his career with Crusaders and East Belfast before moving to Glentoran in October 1974. Caskey played for Glentoran until 1978. He was named as the Northern Ireland Football Writers' Association Player of the Year for the 1976/77 season. In the summer of 1978, the team sent him on loan to the Tulsa Roughnecks of the North American Soccer League. When he returned to Glentoran in the fall, the team sent him and Victor Moreland to Derby County for £90,000. He played two seasons for Derby County, going on loan with Tulsa in 1979. In 1980, Derby County sold his contract to the Roughnecks. In 1983, Tulsa won the NASL championship, but Caskey was sidelined with a broken leg. In the fall of 1984, Caskey returned to Glentoran where he won the 1985 Irish Cup. In the spring of 1985, he returned to the United States and played for the Roughnecks who were now an independent team following the collapse of the NASL. In the fall, he signed with the Dallas Sidekicks of Major Indoor Soccer League. He holds the record for most penalty minutes (34) in the MISL whilst plying for the Dallas Sidekicks. Caskey was suspended from the MISL on 11 August 1986 for three seasons after assaulting a referee during Game 4 of the Dallas Sidekicks Eastern Division Semi-final series with Minnesota Strikers in 1986. This ended his indoor career. He was the first Sidekick ever to be ejected from a playoff game and to be expelled from the league. He returned to Northern Ireland and played with Glentoran until 1993. A year later, he signed with Dundela and completed his professional career with them in 1996. He then played with amateur teams, including Abbey Villa until 2005 when a knee injury forced him into retirement.

== International career ==
On 11 November 1978, Caskey earned the first of his international caps, and scored his first and only goal, with the Northern Ireland national team in a 2–0 victory over Bulgaria. He went on to play seven times with Northern Ireland, his last game coming in a 4–0 loss to France on 24 March 1982.
