= Gregg Thompson =

American soccer player and coach

Personal information
- Date of birth: August 4, 1960 (age 66)
- Place of birth: San Jose, California, United States
- Position: Defender

College career
Years	Team	Apps	(Gls)
1978, 1980–1982	Indiana Hoosiers		

Senior career*
Years	Team	Apps	(Gls)
1983–1984	Tampa Bay Rowdies	47	(0)
1983–1984	Tampa Bay Rowdies (indoor)	35	(9)
1984–1988	Minnesota Strikers (indoor)	187	(29)

International career
1984–1985	United States	12	(1)
- * Club domestic league appearances and goals

Gregg Thompson (born August 4, 1960) is an American former soccer player. He played as a defender who was the 1983 North American Soccer League Rookie of the Year. He was also voted team MVP (by his teammates) and the most Popular Player (by the fans) during his rookie year while playing for the Tampa Bay Rowdies. He spent two seasons in the NASL and four in the Major Indoor Soccer League. He was a member of the U.S. National Team from 1984 to 1986 and participated in the 1984 Summer Olympics. Thompson earned twelve caps with the United States national team.

== High school and college ==
Thompson spent his early youth in California before moving to Stillwater, Minnesota when he was fourteen. He became a star athlete at Stillwater High School. His high school did not have a soccer team when he moved to Minnesota, so Thompson played football and ran track while playing soccer with local youth clubs. He was an outstanding running back, averaging 8.9 yards per carry over his high school career while breaking over 40 football records at Stillwater High School. Thompson was fast running the 40 yard dash in 4.4 seconds and strong benching over 350 lbs. (he weighed 165 pounds) He earned All State honors and received football athletic scholarship offers from the University of Colorado, University of Minnesota, the University of Wisconsin–Madison, numerous Division II schools and all of the Ivy League programs.

His biggest claim to fame was his accomplishments during the state semi-final game against Columbia Heights. There was 30 seconds remaining on the clock, Stillwater was losing the game 14-13 and the ball was 37 yards away from the goalpost. Stillwater decided to attempt a field goal. Thompson was the field goal kicker as well. Thompson was successful in making the 37-yard field goal but there was a penalty on the play. The refs moved the ball back 5 yards. Thompson was again successful in kicking a 42-yard field goal to win the game. It was later found out that Thompson completely tore his ACL and meniscus on the fifth play of the game; nevertheless, his final game stats included throwing a touchdown pass, rushing for 125 yards and kicking the game-winning field goal.

Thompson also went to the state finals in track his senior year long jumping over 22' and triple jumping nearly 47'. (his first triple jump as a junior in high school was the fifth best ever recorded in the state at the time) While he was one of the best football players to come out of the state of Minnesota, he preferred soccer and chose to attend Indiana University when that school offered him an athletic scholarship to play soccer. Thompson was voted the Minnesota High School Athlete of the Year when he graduated from Stillwater in 1978.

Thompson joined the Hoosiers in 1978. He did not play in 1979 because of a knee injury, but became a regular through the 1980–1982 seasons. In 1982, he captained Indiana as it ran to the NCAA championship game. In that game, Indiana went up against Duke University and its top defenseman Joe Ulrich. Thompson scored the first goal, but Duke replied and the game ended tied at one all. The game was in its eighth overtime when Ulrich fouled Thompson just outside the box. Thompson replied with a swerving free kick which found the net, giving Indiana its first national title. Thompson would come in second in the balloting for the Hermann Trophy that year, losing to Ulrich.

In 2007, Thompson was inducted into the Indiana University Hall of Fame. One of only seven soccer players to be inducted into the IU Hall of Fame.

== Professional ==
The Los Angeles Lazers of Major Indoor Soccer League selected Thompson with the number one selection in the 1983 MISL Draft. Tampa Bay Rowdies of the North American Soccer League selected Thompson as the first pick in the 1983 NASL college draft. He elected to sign with the Rowdies and was named the 1983 NASL Rookie of the Year after playing thirty games. Following the 1984 NASL season, the league collapsed. After the collapse of the NASL, the Rowdies traded Thompson to the Minnesota Strikers of Major Indoor Soccer League (MISL). He remained with the Strikers through the 1987–1988 MISL season before retiring.

== National and Olympic teams ==
At the end of the 1983 NASL season, Thompson joined the U.S. Olympic team as it prepared for the 1984 Summer Olympics in Los Angeles. Thompson played all three games for the U.S. at the Olympics, including scoring the U.S. goal in its 1–1 tie with Egypt in front of 85,000 people at Stanford Stadium. The U.S. finished the first round at 1–1–1 and failed to qualify for the second round.

Even before the Olympic games, Thompson had earned his first cap with the U.S. national team in a May 20, 1984 scoreless tie with Italy. He would go on to play a total of 12 times for the full national team between 1984 and 1985, including several qualification matches for the 1986 FIFA World Cup. His last national team game came in the May 31, 1985 debacle in Torrance, California when the U.S. lost to Costa Rica. That loss cost the U.S. a spot in the final round of qualifications.

== Post-playing career ==
Thompson is a partner in a real estate group located in Roseville, CA and coaches youth soccer. He has 4 children (3 boys & a girl) Ty (the oldest) started all four years at Stanford. During his senior year, captained Stanford to their first NCAA Division 1 Championship, Tanner played 4 years at Indiana University. He was All-American during his sophomore, junior and senior year, Tommy was signed as a homegrown player by the San Jose Earthquakes after his freshman year at Indiana University and is a starter for the Earthquakes, Tatum (daughter) is his favorite soccer player of all time.
