= Ivan Belfiore =

Canadian soccer player

Personal information
- Date of birth: 4 September 1960 (age 66)
- Place of birth: Vancouver, British Columbia, Canada
- Position: Defender

Senior career*
Years	Team	Apps	(Gls)
1979–1980	Detroit Express	34	(0)
1980–1981	Detroit Express (indoor)	15	(3)
1981	Washington Diplomats	19	(0)
1982	Chicago Sting	22	(0)
1982–1983	Chicago Sting (indoor)	1	(0)
1983	Tulsa Roughnecks	20	(0)
1983–1984	Tulsa Roughnecks (indoor)	11	(0)
1986	Edmonton Brick Men		
1988–1989	Vancouver 86ers	27	(1)
Total		122	(3)

International career
1978	Canada U20	4	(0)
1979	Canada U23	1	(0)
- * Club domestic league appearances and goals

Ivan Belfiore (born 4 September 1960) is a Canadian former professional soccer player who played as a defender.

== Career ==
Born in Vancouver, British Columbia, Belfiore played as a professional in the North American Soccer League, the Major Indoor Soccer League, the Western Soccer Alliance and the Canadian Soccer League for the Detroit Express, the Washington Diplomats, the Chicago Sting, the Tulsa Roughnecks, the Edmonton Brick Men and Vancouver 86ers.

Belfiore made four appearances for the Canadian under-20 national team during the 1978 CONCACAF U-20 tournament, and he also played one game for the Canadian Olympic Team during qualifications for the 1980 Summer Olympics.
