= Peter Gruber (footballer) =

German footballer

Personal information
- Date of birth: 7 September 1952 (age 74)
- Place of birth: Munich, West Germany
- Position: Defender

Youth career
- SV Gartenstadt Trudering

Senior career*
Years	Team	Apps	(Gls)
1976–1980	Bayern Munich	41	(2)
1980–1981	Dallas Tornado	59	(4)
1980–1981	Dallas Tornado (indoor)	11	(9)
1982	Tampa Bay Rowdies	20	(0)
1983	Chicago Sting	25	(1)
1983–1984	Chicago Sting (indoor)	18	(0)
- * Club domestic league appearances and goals

Peter Gruber (born 7 September 1952) is a German former professional footballer who played as a defender.

Gruber spent four seasons in the Bundesliga with FC Bayern Munich. In 1980, he moved to the United States and signed with the Dallas Tornado of the North American Soccer League. After two outdoor and one indoor season with the Tornado, he moved to the Tampa Bay Rowdies for one season before finishing his NASL career with the Chicago Sting. In March 1986, he was awarded $22,580 in workers' compensation for a 1983 knee injury he received during an indoor game with the Sting.

== Honours ==
- Bundesliga champion: 1979–80
