= Tulsa Roughnecks (1993–2000) =

- Founded: 1993
- Dissolved: 2000

The second Tulsa Roughnecks were an American soccer team that played in the United Soccer Leagues from 1993–99.

== History ==
In January 1993, Tulsa businessman "Mack" Amini applied for a franchise in the United States Interregional Soccer League. The application was approved and the team began play in the summer of 1993 under head coach Ali Adibi who had been coaching the Southern Nazarene soccer team. In 1994, Adibi was named Coach of the Year. Adibi resigned in 1995 and was replaced by Zeljko "Vince" Krsnik. Krsnik lasted only three weeks before being fired. Adibi replaced him as interim coach, but the coaching turmoil led to drop in the standings. Tulsa, which had finished in either first or second place each season, now finished in seventh. In September 1995, the team elevated player Victor Moreland to the head coaching position. In November 1996, Adibi returned again as head coach. Adibi would continue to coach the team until it folded in 1999, except for several games during the summer of 1998 when two players shared the duties of coach as Adibi dealt with business matters. During the winter of 1998–1999, the Roughnecks did not play an indoor season for the first time in its existence. In 1999, the team went under new ownership which renamed it the Green Country Roughnecks. In 1999, Adibi purchased the team, renamed it the Tulsa Roughnecks and withdrew it from the USL. The Roughnecks spent the 1999–2000 winter season playing with several unafilliated indoor teams in an ad hoc league. The Roughnecks were good enough to go the championship game where they fell to the Oklahoma City Hatters. Adibi disbanded the team at the end of the season.

=== Year-by-year ===
==== Indoor ====
Year	Division	League	Reg. season	Playoffs	Open Cup
1993/94	3	USISL Indoor	1st, South Central	3rd Place	N/A
1994/95	3	USISL Indoor	2nd, South Central	Semifinals	N/A
1995/96	3	USISL Indoor	2nd, Central	Sizzlin' Five	N/A
1996/97	3	USISL I-League	1st, West	Runners-up	N/A
1997/98	3	USISL I-League	2nd	Runners-up	N/A
1999/2000	3		Runner up	Did not qualify	Did not qualify

==== Outdoor ====
Year	Division	League	Reg. season	Playoffs	Open Cup
1993	N/A	USISL	1st South Central	Divisional Finals	Did not enter
1994	3	USISL	1st, South Central	Divisional Semifinals	Did not enter
1995	3	USISL Pro League	7th, South Central	Did not qualify	Did not qualify
1996	3	USISL Pro League	3rd, Central	Conference Finals	Did not qualify
1997	3	USISL D-3 Pro League	4th, South Central	Did not qualify	Did not qualify
1998	3	USISL D-3 Pro League	4th, South Central	Did not qualify	Did not qualify
1999	3	USL D-3 Pro League	6th, Western	Did not qualify	Did not qualify

== Coaches ==
- Ali Adibi (1993–1995)
- Zeljko "Vince" Krsnik (1995)
- Ali Adibi (1995)
- Victor Moreland (1995–1996)
- Ali Adibi (1996–2000)
- Tama Andofar / Jason Maricle (1998 – interim)
