= Branko Šegota =

Canadian soccer player (born 1961)

Personal information
- Full name: Branimir Šegota
- Date of birth: June 8, 1961 (age 65)
- Place of birth: Rijeka, FPR Yugoslavia
- Height: 5 ft 8 in (1.73 m)
- Position: Striker

Senior career*
Years	Team	Apps	(Gls)
1978	Montreal Castors		
1978–1981	New York Arrows (indoor)	87	(94)
1979–1980	Rochester Lancers	39	(25)
1981–1983	Fort Lauderdale Strikers	74	(30)
1983	Fort Lauderdale Strikers (indoor)	9	(10)
1984	Golden Bay Earthquakes	24	(18)
1984–1991	San Diego Sockers (indoor)	282	(298)
1988	Toronto Blizzard	8	(5)
1991–1992	St. Louis Storm (indoor)	34	(47)
1994–1995	Las Vegas Dustdevils (indoor)	25	(34)
1996–1997	Baltimore Spirit (indoor)	18	(15)

International career
1980–1988	Canada	20	(3)

Managerial career
- 2004: Cleveland Internationals (assistant)
- * Club domestic league appearances and goals

Branimir "Branko" Šegota (born June 8, 1961) is a Canadian former professional soccer forward, starring in the original Major Indoor Soccer League (MISL), the North American Soccer League (NASL), the Continental Indoor Soccer League (CISL), the National Professional Soccer League, and the Canadian Soccer League.

== Club career ==
Born in Rijeka, then part of PR Croatia, FPR Yugoslavia, Branko Šegota moved with his family to Canada at the age of 7. Raised in Toronto, Ontario, Šegota began his pro soccer career at age 17, signing with the New York Arrows of MISL. Before he began his indoor career he played in the National Soccer League in 1978 with Montreal Castors. He was named NASL's North American player of the year in 1984 with the Golden Bay Earthquakes. During his 18-year pro career he also played outdoors in the NASL in 1979 and 1980 with Rochester Lancers and from 1981 to 1983 with Fort Lauderdale Strikers and several summers after that in the Canadian Soccer League with the Toronto Blizzard. Šegota played winters in the MISL with the Arrows, San Diego Sockers from 1984 to 1985 through 1990–91, and St. Louis Storm. He played indoors (in 1994 and 1995) for the Las Vegas Dustdevils of the CISL and as recently as 1997 for the Baltimore Spirit of the National Professional Soccer League.

Šegota scored 73 goals in 147 regular season NASL games to rank 13th in the history of the league. He also scored 12 goals in 13 play-off games, including 11 in the 1981 play-offs. In the history of the original MISL he ranked second in career goal and points scoring with 463 goals and 841 points. His 378 assists ranks him third. His being nine MISL championship teams, three with the Arrows and 6 with the Sockers is also a record. He was a five-time MISL all-star.

== International career ==
Šegota earned 20 caps for Canada including appearances as a substitute in all 3 of the country's 1986 World Cup games. He played for Canada at the 1979 FIFA World Youth Championship, scoring twice in a 3–1 win over Portugal. He earned his first senior cap in a 1–1 World Cup qualifying draw against Mexico in 1980. Šegota scored three goals in his 20 appearances. His final cap came in a 3–2 win over Guatemala in a World Cup qualifier in 1988. He was inducted into the Canadian Soccer Hall of Fame in 2002.

== Coaching career ==
Šegota served as an assistant coach with the Cleveland Internationals of the Premier Development League in 2004 after coaching their youth program for 6 years. He has three children, Ashley, Toni, and Emma, with his wife Ena Šegota.

== Career statistics ==
Scores and results list Canada's goal tally first.

#	Date	Venue	Opponent	Score	Result	Competition
1	November 1, 1980	Empire Stadium, Vancouver, Canada	United States	2–0	2–1	1982 FIFA World Cup qualification
3.	October 12, 1981	Skinner Park, San Fernando, Trinidad and Tobago	Trinidad and Tobago	2–0	4–2	Friendly match
5	October 14, 1981	Stade Pierre-Antonius, Pointe-à-Pitre, Guadeloupe	Guadeloupe	2–1	2–1	Friendly match
