= Njego Pesa =

American soccer player (born 1958)

Personal information
- Date of birth: May 30, 1958 (age 68)
- Place of birth: Zaton, PR Croatia, FPR Yugoslavia
- Height: 5 ft 9 in (1.75 m)
- Position: Forward

College career
Years	Team	Apps	(Gls)
1978–1979	Ulster Senators		

Senior career*
Years	Team	Apps	(Gls)
1979–1981	Dallas Tornado	64	(18)
1979–1980	St. Louis Steamers (indoor)	15	(15)
1982	Tampa Bay Rowdies	11	(0)
1982–1983	Tulsa Roughnecks	35	(15)
1983–1984	New York Arrows (indoor)	17	(15)
1984–1986	St. Louis Steamers (indoor)	87	(42)
1986–1987	New York Express (indoor)	20	(16)
1986–1987	San Diego Sockers (indoor)	17	(5)

International career
1979–1982	United States	7	(0)
- * Club domestic league appearances and goals

Njego Pesa (Croatian: Peša; born May 30, 1958) is an American former soccer forward who played in the North American Soccer League and Major Indoor Soccer League. He earned seven caps with the U.S. national team.

== Youth ==
Pesa was born in Croatia, but moved to the U.S. as a youth and grew up in Queens, New York. He attended Ulster Community College where he played on the men's soccer team from 1977 to 1978. Ulster won the JUCO national title in 1978 with Pesa leading the attack.

== Professional ==
In January 1979, the Dallas Tornado of the North American Soccer League (NASL) traded Jeff Bourne in exchange for the first pick in the upcoming College Draft. With that pick, they took Pesa, signing him for $18,000. In 1979, he saw time in twelve games, scoring only one goal, but came alive in 1980 when he bagged thirteen goals in twenty-six appearances. During the winter of 1979–1980, Pesa also played for the expansion St. Louis Steamers of the Major Indoor Soccer League. In 1981, Pesa experienced a scoring drought with the Tornado, scoring only one goal in twenty-six games. The Tornado then traded him to the Tampa Bay Rowdies. The Rowdies traded him to the Tulsa Roughnecks halfway through the 1982 season after Pesa failed to score in eleven games. The trade took place on July 2, 1982, as the Rowdies sent Pesa and Terry Moore to Tulsa in exchange for Don Droege. Pesa regained his scoring touch with the Roughnecks, getting four goals in thirteen games with Tulsa that season. Then in 1983, his career hit its highest point as Tulsa went to the NASL title game. The Roughnecks won that game, and the NASL title, defeating the Toronto Blizzard 2–0. Pesa scored the first goal and was the game's MVP. Pesa left both the Roughnecks and the NASL in 1983 to devote himself to indoor soccer. In 1983, he signed with the New York Arrows of Major Indoor Soccer League (MISL). In March 1984, the Arrows sold him to the St. Louis Steamers. He remained with the Steamers through the 1985–1986 season. In 1986, he moved to the expansion New York Express, but the team folded after the half time break. Pesa became a free agent and signed with the San Diego Sockers on March 6, 1987. The Sockers released him in June following the loss to the Tacoma Stars in the MISL championship series.

== National team ==
Pesa earned seven caps with the U.S. national team between 1979 and 1982.

He scored one goal with the U.S. Olympic team in a 4–4 tie with Suriname in an April 2, 1980 Olympic qualification game. However, that game is not considered a full international by FIFA.
