= Iraj Danaeifard =

Iranian footballer (1951–2018)

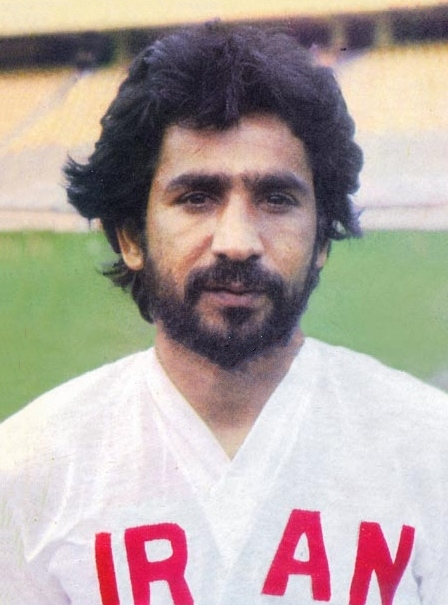
- Iraj playing at 1970 Asian Champion Club Tournament

Personal information
- Date of birth: 11 March 1951
- Place of birth: Tehran, Iran
- Date of death: 12 December 2018 (aged 67)
- Place of death: Shiraz, Iran
- Position: Midfielder

Senior career*
Years	Team	Apps	(Gls)
1970–1972	Taj		
1972–1974	Oghab		
1974–1977	Pas		
1977–1980	Taj		
1980–1984	Tulsa Roughnecks	67	(3)
1980–1984	Tulsa Roughnecks (indoor)	32	(12)

International career^{‡}
1977–1980	Iran	17	(3)
- * Club domestic league appearances and goals as of 30 August 2006 ‡ National team caps and goals as of 30 August 2006

Iraj Danaeifard (Persian: ايرج دانايی فرد, 11 March 1951 – 12 December 2018) was an Iranian football player who played most of his career for Taj and also the Iran national football team.

== Club career ==
Danaeifard became involved in football at a young age. His father, Ali Danaeifard was one of the founders of Taj SC football club. He became famous in Iran while playing for the club, winning the Iranian league in 1971. He also played for Oghab F.C. and Pas F.C., where he won the Iranian Takht Jamshid in 1977. In 1977, he returned to Taj.

In 1980, he moved to the United States and started playing for the NASL team, the Tulsa Roughnecks. He won a major league championship ring in 1983 when the Roughnecks won the NASL title. He remained in the club until 1984 when the league folded, and retired from football soon thereafter.

== International career ==
Danaeifard was invited to the national team for the first time in 1977 and helped the team qualify for 1978 World Cup. He played well in the tournament and many still remember his goal against Scotland, which was Iran's first goal ever at a World Cup. After the Asian Cup in Kuwait in 1980 and reaching the third place he retired from international football with 17 caps and 3 goals for his country.

== Death ==
Danaeifard died on 12 December 2018 of liver failure. He was 67.

== Career statistics ==
=== International goals ===
#	Date	Venue	Opponent	Score	Result	Competition
1.	7 Jun 1978	Estadio Chateau Carreras, Córdoba, Argentina	Scotland	1–1	D	1978 FIFA World Cup
2.	5 Sep 1980	Al-Ain Stadium, Al-Ain, United Arab Emirates	United Arab Emirates	2–0	W	Friendly
3.	24 Sep 1980	Sabah Al Salem Stadium, Kuwait City, Kuwait	North Korea	3–2	W	1980 AFC Asian Cup
Correct as of 24 July 2021
