= Tulsa Roughnecks (1978–1984) =

Defunct American soccer club

- Full name: Tulsa Roughnecks
- Nicknames: Roughnecks; Necks
- Founded: November 15, 1977
- Dissolved: July 17, 1985; 41 years ago
- Stadium: outdoor: Skelly Stadium (40,000) indoor: Tulsa Assembly Center (8,900); Tulsa Fairgrounds Pavilion (5,883)
- League: NASL
Home colors	Away colors

The Tulsa Roughnecks (1978–1984) were a North American Soccer League (NASL) team from Tulsa, Oklahoma. It played its home games at Skelly Stadium on the campus of the University of Tulsa. The team, previously Team Hawaii, moved to Tulsa after the 1977 season. In 1983, Alex Skotarek became general manager and led one of the lowest-budgeted teams in the NASL to a championship, defeating Toronto, 2–0, at Soccer Bowl '83.

Shortly after the Tulsa Roughnecks victory of the 1983 Soccer Bowl, President Ronald Reagan sent congratulatory remarks to the team as they carried the trophy in a celebration parade through downtown Tulsa. Until the Oklahoma City Thunder won the NBA Finals in 2025, the Roughnecks were the only major professional team from Oklahoma to win a championship.

== Highlights ==
The Roughnecks first match was a 6–5 indoor loss on February 11, 1978, at the Bayfront Center versus the Tampa Bay Rowdies. Three nights later in their home debut, the same two teams faced off in front of the first 3,250 Roughnecks fans at the Tulsa Assembly Center. A few weeks later they would capture the Skelly Indoor Invitational which they hosted. Over the years Tulsa regularly appeared in the NASL playoffs. They won the NASL title in Soccer Bowl '83, defeating the Toronto Blizzard at BC Place Stadium (Vancouver) by a score of 2–0 before a paid attendance of 60,051. The team's all-time win–loss record was 104–106. The Roughnecks' home games consistently drew better-than-league-average attendance with the annual record occurring during the 1980 season when the team averaged 19,787 spectators over 16 games for a total attendance that year of 316,593 (placing the Roughnecks at No. 5 between the Seattle Sounders and the Washington Diplomats). The largest home game attendance for Tulsa occurred on April 26, 1980, when 30,822 fans watched the Roughnecks' 2–1 victory over the New York Cosmos at Skelly Stadium. The highest attendance for any Roughneck game occurred on August 26, 1979, when Tulsa met the Cosmos in New York for a NASL playoff game before a crowd of 76,031.

=== Post-NASL ===
When, in August 1984, the Major Indoor Soccer League rejected the Roughnecks' application to join several other NASL teams in participating in the MISL's 1984–85 season (citing the town's small market status and subpar arena), team owners decided to fold the financially struggling franchise as of the end of the NASL season in September. Former general manager Noel Lemon and a handful of local investors were not ready to give up on soccer in Tulsa, and they were granted permission in January 1985 to revive the name and put together a team to play outdoors that summer. Before this club could take the field, though, the NASL completed its long, slow collapse and cancelled the upcoming 1985 season in March. Lemon's new Roughnecks, which featured several holdover players from the previous iteration of the team, carried on as an independent club and pieced together a 20-game exhibition schedule against teams from the MISL, WACS, Europe and South America, as well as former NASL and USL sides that had not folded. Excluding several cancelations along the way, the team compiled a record of 8–2–1, before suspending operations on July 17, 1985.

Famous Roughnecks players include Iraj Danaeifard, Alex Skotarek, Charlie Mitchell, Billy Caskey, Victor Moreland, Barry Wallace, Alan Woodward, Zeljko Bilecki, Carmelo D'Anzi, Winston DuBose, Njego Pesa, Laurie Abrahams, Chance Fry, Terry Moore and David McCreery.

== Media Coverage ==
The Roughnecks had good media coverage from the start with KRMG (AM) broadcasting on radio and initially KTUL television, before the switch to Tulsa Cable Sports. Bob Carpenter called games on both outlets.

== Year-by-year ==
Year	League	W	L	T	Pts	Reg. season	Playoffs	Avg. attendance
1978	NASL indoor	2	2	0	—	N/A	Won, Skelly Invitational	2,250
1978	NASL	15	15	0	132	2nd, National Conference, Central Division	Lost 1st Round (Minnesota)	11,256
1979	NASL indoor	0	3	0	—	N/A	3rd Place, Budweiser Invitational	6,340
1979	NASL	14	16	0	139	3rd, National Conference, Central Division	Won Conference Quarterfinal (Minnesota); Lost Conference Semifinal (New York)	16,426
1979–80	NASL Indoor	7	5	0	—	3rd, Western	Lost 1st Round (Minnesota)	4,657
1980	NASL	15	17	0	139	3rd, National Conference, Central Division	Lost 1st Round (New York)	19,787
1980–81	NASL Indoor	9	9	0	—	2nd, Southern Division	did not qualify	5,288
1981	NASL	17	15	0	154	3rd, Central Division	Lost 1st Round (Minnesota)	17,188
1981–82	NASL Indoor	10	8	0	—	3rd, American Conference, Central Division	Won 1st Round (Chicago); Lost Semifinal (Tampa Bay)	5,308
1982	NASL	16	16	0	112	2nd, Southern Division	Lost 1st Round (New York)	14,554
1983	NASL Indoor Grand Prix	4	4	0	—	3rd in Grand Prix preliminary rounds	Lost Semifinal (Tampa Bay); Won 3rd place match (Ft. Lauderdale)	3,293
1983	NASL	17	13	0	145	1st, Southern Division	Won 1st Round (Ft. Lauderdale); Won Semifinals (Montreal); Won Soccer Bowl '83 (Toronto)	12,415
1983–84	NASL Indoor	11	21	0	—	6th	did not qualify	3,707
1984	NASL	10	14	0	98	4th, Western Division	did not qualify	7,797
1985	Independent	8	2	1	—	friendlies only	none	3,651

== Honors ==
NASL championships (2)
- 1983
- 1978 indoor tournament

Division champions (1)

- 1983 Southern Division

Rookie of the Year

- 1981 Joe Morrone, Jr.

Soccer Bowl MVP

- 1983 Njego Pesa

Indoor Tournament MVP

- 1978 Nino Zec & Tibor Molnar
- 1983 Laurie Abrahams (offensive)

Indoor leading goal scorer

- 1978 Nino Zec & Milan Dovedan (5 goals)
- 1983 Laurie Abrahams (12 goals)

Indoor Leading Scorer

- 1978 Nino Zec (5 goals, 2 assists, 12 points)
- 1983 Laurie Abrahams (12 goals, 6 assists, 30 points)

Indoor Assists Leader

- 1979–80 Steve Earle (18 assists)

All-Star first team selections

- 1983 Barry Wallace

All-Star second team selections

- 1981 Barry Wallace
- 1982 Barry Wallace
- 1984 Terry Moore & Victor Moreland

All-Star honorable mentions

- 1981 Duncan McKenzie
- 1982 Laurie Abrahams
- 1984 Ron Futcher

Indoor All-Tournament Team

- 1978 Nino Zec, Milan Dovedan, Tibor Molnar, Gary Allison

Indoor All-Stars

- 1981–82 Barry Wallace
- 1983–84 Barry Wallace (starter) & Zequinha (reserve)

Canadian Soccer Hall of Fame

- 2004 Bob Bolitho
- 2005 Terry Moore
- 2008 Jack Brand

Indoor Soccer Hall of Fame

- 2012 Kim Roentved

== Ownership & Staff ==
- (United States) Carl Moore – Co-Owner (1978–83)
- (United States) Mike Kimbrel – Co-Owner (1978–83)
- (United States) Rick Lowenherz – Co-Owner (1978–83)
- (United States) Fred Williams – Co-Owner (1978–83)
- (United States) Jim Boeh – Communications Director
- (United States) Noel Lemon – General Manager (1978–1981
- (United States) Alex Skotarek – General Manager (1983)
- Tulsa Cable – Owner (1984)

=== Players ===
- (Brazil) Zequinha (1983–84)
- (Canada) (Socialist Federal Republic of Yugoslavia) Željko Bilecki (1981–82)
- (Canada) Bob Bolitho (1980–81)
- (Canada) (Germany) Jack Brand (1979)
- (Canada) Dean DiTocco (1978–80)
- (Canada) Terry Moore (1982–84)
- (Denmark) Kim Roentved (1982)
- (England) Laurie Abrahams (1979, 1982–83)
- (England) Colin Boulton (1978–79)
- (England) David Bradford (1982/1984)
- (England) Viv Busby (1981–82)
- (England) Chris Dangerfield (1978)
- (England) Terry Darracott (1979)
- (England) Roger Davies (1979)
- (England) Alan Dugdale (1980–81)
- (England) Steve Earle (1978/1980)
- (England) Lil Fuccillo (1983)
- (England) Ron Futcher (1983–84)
- (England) David Irving (1980)
- (England) David Johnson (1984)
- (England) Jimmy Kelly (1980–81)
- (England) Duncan McKenzie (1981)
- (England) David Nish (1979)
- (England) Tommy Ord (1980)
- (England) Colin Waldron (1978)
- (England) Barry Wallace (1980–85)
- (England) Alan Woodward (1979–81)
- (Germany) Franz Gerber (1982)
- (Iceland) Johannes Edvaldsson (1980–81)
- (Iran) Iraj Danaeifard (1980–85)
- (Republic of Ireland) Don O'Riordan (1979–80)
- (Italy) Carmelo D'Anzi (1983)
- (Nigeria) Thompson Usiyan (1983–84)
- (Northern Ireland) Billy Caskey (1978–85)
- (Northern Ireland) David McCreery (1981–82)
- (Northern Ireland) Chris McGrath (1981–82)
- (Northern Ireland) Victor Moreland (1978; 1980–85)
- (Poland) Adam Krupa (1981–85)
- (Scotland) Charlie Mitchell (1978)
- (Scotland) Davie Robb (1980)
- (Scotland) Eric Robertson (1980)
- (United States) Delroy Allen (1980–82)
- (United States) Matt Bahr (1978)
- (United States) Winston DuBose (1982–85)
- (United States) Gene DuChateau (1979–81)
- (United States) Chance Fry (1983–85)
- (United States) Billy Gazonas (1978–1980)
- (United States) Joe Morrone, Jr. (1981–1982)
- (United States) (Socialist Federal Republic of Yugoslavia) Njego Pesa (1982–83)
- (United States) Bill Sautter (1978–79)
- (United States) Alex Skotarek (1978–81)
- (United States) Brian Shugart
- (Wales) Ron Davies (1979)
- (Wales) Clive Griffiths (1980)
- (Wales) Wayne Hughes (1979)
- (Socialist Federal Republic of Yugoslavia) Petar Nikezić (1978)
- (Socialist Federal Republic of Yugoslavia) Nino Zec (1978, 1983–84)

Many former players have found employment as paid trainers of youth soccer teams for clubs such as the Tulsa United, Tulsa Soccer Club (TSC), Tornado Soccer Club, and Hurricane Football Club (HFC).

=== Coaches ===
- (England) Bill Foulkes (1978)
- (United States) (Germany) Alex Skotarek (1978)
- (England) Alan Hinton (1979)
- (Scotland) Charlie Mitchell (1980–1981)
- (Wales) Terry Hennessey (1981–1983, won 1983 Soccer Bowl)
- (England) Steve Earle (1983–84 indoor season only)
- (Netherlands) Wim Suurbier (1984)

== See also ==
- San Antonio Thunder
- Team Hawaii
- Tulsa Renegades
- Tulsa Roughnecks (1993–2000)
- Tulsa Tornados
