= 1988 San Jose Earthquakes season =

San Jose Earthquakes
1988 season
- Coach: Tony Zanotto
- Stadium: Spartan Stadium
- Western Soccer Alliance: 3rd
- WSA Playoffs: Final
- National Challenge Cup: Did not enter
- Top goalscorer: Frank Van den Brand Horninge (5)

The 1988 San Jose Earthquakes season was their fifteenth overall, and the club's fourth in the Western Soccer Alliance. The Earthquakes finished the season in third place and reached the final in the playoffs, losing 5–0 to the Seattle Storm.

== Squad ==
The 1988 squad

Note: Flags indicate national team as defined under FIFA eligibility rules; some limited exceptions apply. Players may hold more than one non-FIFA nationality.

No.	Pos.	Nation	Player
—	DF	USA	Alex Basso
—	MF	USA	Ralph Black
—	MF	MEX	Tomas Boy
—	DF	USA	Barney Boyce
—	FW		Abuelo Cruz
—	MF	ENG	Chris Dangerfield
—	GK	USA	Vince Da Silva
—	MF	USA	Mike Getchell
—	FW	USA	Tim Graefe
—	GK		Nicholas Hatzopoulos
—	MF	USA	John Houston
—	FW	USA	Jim Hutchinson
—	FW		Jorge Ilbanez
—	GK	USA	Aram Kardzair
—	FW	USA	Jacques LaDouceur

No.	Pos.	Nation	Player
—	FW		Alberto Luna
—	DF	USA	Steve McCargo
—	DF		John Nicholson
—	MF		Oscar Padilla
—	FW	USA	George Pastor
—	FW	USA	Tony Salciccia
—	MF	USA	Tom Silvas
—	DF	USA	Joe Siveria
—	GK	USA	Hunter Stern
—	FW	VIE	Dzung Tran
—	FW		Frank Van den Brand Horninge
—	GK	USA	David Vanole
—	DF	USA	Chris Wentzien
—	DF	USA	Mike Whitlatch Retired professional soccer player. Was captain of Chico State Soccer team then Played right back for San Jose Earthquakes, represented US in Marlboro cup
—	DF	USA	Robbie Zipp

== Competitions ==
=== Western Soccer Alliance ===
==== Season ====
Date	Opponent	Venue	Result	Scorers
May 1, 1988	Vancouver Whitecaps	H	0–4	
May 11, 1988	Calgary Kickers	H	3–3*	Basso (3)
May 21, 1988	California Kickers	H	3–0 (aet)	Vilmar (2), Getchell
June 5, 1988	San Diego Nomads	H	1–1*	Tran
June 10, 1988	Los Angeles Heat	A	2–0 (aet)	Van den Brand Horninge, Dangerfield
June 12, 1988	California Kickers	A	4–2 (aet)	Silvas, Tran, Ilbanez, Van den Brand Horninge
June 17, 1988	F.C. Portland	H	1–0	Van den Brand Horninge
June 25, 1988	Los Angeles Heat	H	1–0 (aet)	Zipp
July 1, 1988	Seattle Storm	A	0–3	
July 2, 1988	F.C. Portland	A	3–1	Whitlatch, Salccicia, Van den Brand Horninge
July 8, 1988	San Diego Nomads	A	1–2 (aet)	Van den Brand Horninge
July 17, 1988	Seattle Storm	H	1–3	Dangerfield

==== Playoffs ====
Date	Opponent	Venue	Result	Scorers
July 23, 1988	San Diego Nomads	A	1–1*	Boy
July 30, 1988	Seattle Storm	A	0–5	

* = Penalty kicks

==== Standings ====
Place	Team	GP	W	L	GF	GA	Points
1	Seattle Storm	12	10	2	25	10	83
2	San Diego Nomads	12	9	3	23	17	76
3	San Jose Earthquakes	12	7	5	20	19	61
4	Los Angeles Heat	12	7	5	20	17	61
5	California Kickers	12	3	9	17	28	35
6	F.C. Portland	12	1	11	16	32	22

Points system: Six points per win. One point per goal up to three points per game.
