= List of San Jose Earthquakes seasons =

The San Jose Earthquakes are a soccer team based in San Jose, California, that competes in Major League Soccer (MLS), the most senior soccer league in the United States. San Jose Earthquakes was established as the San Jose Clash in 1994 becoming a founding member of MLS where they competed starting in 1996. The team rebranded and changed their name in 2000 to San Jose Earthquakes, connecting them with the former professional team that played in San Jose from 1974 to 1988. The franchise was moved at the conclusion of the 2005 MLS season to Houston to become the Houston Dynamo, thus putting the team and its records on hiatus. The team was revived two years later as an MLS expansion franchise, beginning play in 2008.

In addition to the MLS season, San Jose also competes in the annual U.S. Open Cup tournament. Depending on the team's performance in these two competitions, they may also qualify for the MLS Cup Playoffs in the same year and the CONCACAF Champions League the following year. The CONCACAF Champions League winner qualifies for the next FIFA Club World Cup. The Earthquakes have won two MLS Cups and Supporters Shields apiece, but they have yet to win the Lamar Hunt U.S. Open Cup. Having won 4 trophies, San Jose is the eighth most successful MLS club and one of only three clubs to win the MLS Cup and Supporters Shield multiple times. The following list summarizes the Earthquakes' yearly performance in all competitive competitions.

== Key ==
Key to competitions

- Major League Soccer (MLS) – The top-flight of soccer in the United States, established in 1996.
- U.S. Open Cup (USOC) – The premier knockout cup competition in U.S. soccer, first contested in 1914.
- CONCACAF Champions League (CCL) – The premier competition in North American soccer since 1962. It went by the name of Champions' Cup until 2008.

Key to colors and symbols

1st or W	Winners
2nd or RU	Runners-up
3rd	Third place
Last	Wooden Spoon
♦	MLS Golden Boot
	Highest average attendance
Italics	Ongoing competition

Key to league record

- Season = The year and article of the season
- Div = Division/level on pyramid
- League = League name
- Pld = Games played
- W = Games won
- L = Games lost
- D = Games drawn
- GF = Goals for
- GA = Goals against
- GD = Goal difference
- Pts = Points
- PPG = Points per game
- Conf. = Conference position
- Overall = League position

Key to cup record

- DNE = Did not enter
- DNQ = Did not qualify
- NH = Competition not held or canceled
- QR = Qualifying round
- PR = Preliminary round
- GS = Group stage
- R1 = First round
- R2 = Second round
- R3 = Third round
- R4 = Fourth round
- R5 = Fifth round
- Ro16 = Round of 16
- QF = Quarterfinals
- SF = Semifinals
- F = Final
- RU = Runners-up
- W = Winners

== Seasons ==
Season	League										Position		Playoffs	USOC	Continental / Other		Average attendance	Top goalscorer(s)	
Season	League	Pld	W	L	D	GF	GA	GD	Pts	PPG	Conf.	Overall	Playoffs	USOC	Continental / Other		Average attendance	Name(s)	Goals
1974	NASL	20	9	8	3	43	38	15	21	1.05	2nd West	4th	QF	DNE	DNE	DNE	16,584	(United States) Paul Child	15
1975	NASL	22	8	14	0	37	48	−11	16	0.72	5th West	17th	did not qualify	DNE	DNE	DNE	17,927	(United States) llija Mitic	14
1976	NASL	24	14	10	0	47	30	17	28	1.16	1st South	6th	SF	DNE	DNE	DNE	19,826	(United States) llija Mitic	14
1977	NASL	26	14	12	0	37	44	−13	28	1.07	2nd South	9th	R1	DNE			17,739	(United States) Paul Child	13
1978	NASL	30	8	22	0	36	81	−45	16	0.53	4th American West	23rd	did not qualify	DNE			14,281	(United States) Paul Child / (Netherlands) Peter Ressel	8
1979	NASL	30	8	22	0	41	74	−33	16	0.53	4th American West	23rd	did not qualify	DNE			15,092	(Germany) Bernie Gersdorff	10
1980	NASL	32	9	23	0	45	68	−23	18	0.56	4th American West	23rd	did not qualify				13,169	(Trinidad and Tobago) Steve David	14
1981	NASL	32	11	21	0	44	78	−34	22	0.69	4th West	19th	did not qualify				12,400	(England) George Best	13
1982	NASL	32	13	19	0	47	62	−45	26	0.81	5th West	11th	did not qualify				11,012	Godfrey Ingram	17
1983	NASL	30	20	10	0	71	54	17	40	1.33	2nd West	3rd	SF				11,933	(Socialist Federal Republic of Yugoslavia) Steve Zungul	16
1984	NASL	24	8	16	0	61	62	−1	16	0.67	5th West	8th	did not qualify				10,676	(Socialist Federal Republic of Yugoslavia) Steve Zungul	20
1985	WACS	7	4	2	1	10	9	1	9	1.29	N/A	1st	N/A					(England) Chris Dangerfield	2
1986	WSA	14	3	4	7	13	23	−10	13	0.93	N/A	6th	N/A					(United States) Chris Fry	8
1987	WSA	13	6	7	0	21	13					3rd	Runners-up						
1988	WSA	12	7	5	0	20	19					3rd	Runners-up						
1989– 1995	No club existed																		
1996	MLS	32	15	17	0	50	50	0	39	1.22	4th	6th	QF	DNE	DNE		17,232	(United States) Paul Bravo	13
1997	MLS	32	12	20	0	50	59	−9	30	1.07	5th	10th	DNQ	QF	DNQ		13,597	(El Salvador) Ronald Cerritos	12
1998	MLS	32	13	19	0	48	60	−12	33	1.03	5th	10th	DNQ	QF	DNQ		13,653	(El Salvador) Ronald Cerritos	13
1999	MLS	32	19	13	0	48	49	−1	37	1.16	5th	7th	DNQ	DNQ	DNQ		14,959	(El Salvador) Ronald Cerritos	15
2000	MLS	32	7	17	8	35	50	−15	29	0.91	4th	12th	DNQ	QF	DNQ		12,460	(Sierra Leone) Abdul Conteh	8
2001	MLS	26	13	7	6	47	29	18	45	1.73	2nd	5th	W	QF	DNQ		9,635	(El Salvador) Ronald Cerritos	11
2002	MLS	28	14	11	3	45	35	10	45	1.61	2nd	2nd	QF	QF	CONCACAF Champions' Cup	QF	11,150	(Ecuador) Ariel Graziani	14
2003	MLS	30	14	7	9	45	35	10	51	1.70	1st	2nd	W	Ro16	CONCACAF Champions' Cup	Ro16	10,465	(United States) Landon Donovan	12
2004	MLS	30	9	10	11	41	35	6	38	1.27	4th	7th	QF	SF	CONCACAF Champions' Cup	QF	13,001	(United States) Brian Ching	12
2005	MLS	32	18	4	10	53	31	22	64	2.00	1st	1st	QF	QF	DNQ		13,037	(Canada) Dwayne De Rosario	9
2006	On Hiatus																		
2007	On Hiatus																		
2008	MLS	30	8	13	9	32	38	−6	33	1.10	7th	14th	DNQ	QR1	DNE		13,713	(England) Darren Huckerby	6
2009	MLS	30	7	14	9	36	50	−14	30	1.00	8th	14th	DNQ	QR1	DNQ		14,114	(Jamaica) Ryan Johnson	11
2010	MLS	30	13	10	7	34	33	1	46	1.53	6th	8th	SF	QR2	DNQ		9,659	(United States) Chris Wondolowski	19♦
2011	MLS	34	8	12	14	40	45	−5	38	1.12	7th	14th	DNQ	QR3	DNQ		11,857	(United States) Chris Wondolowski	16
2012	MLS	34	19	6	9	72	43	29	66	1.94	1st	1st	QF	QF	DNQ		13,293	(United States) Chris Wondolowski	27♦
2013	MLS	34	14	11	9	35	42	−7	51	1.50	6th	10th	DNQ	R3	CONCACAF Champions League	QF	12,765	(United States) Chris Wondolowski	13
2014	MLS	34	6	16	12	35	50	−15	30	0.88	9th	18th	DNQ	Ro16	DNQ		14,947	(United States) Chris Wondolowski	14
2015	MLS	34	13	13	8	41	39	2	47	1.38	7th	13th	DNQ	Ro16	DNQ		20,979	(United States) Chris Wondolowski	18
2016	MLS	34	8	12	14	32	40	−8	38	1.12	9th	17th	DNQ	R4	DNQ		19,930	(United States) Chris Wondolowski	12
2017	MLS	34	13	14	7	39	60	−21	46	1.35	6th	12th	R1	SF	DNQ		19,875	(United States) Chris Wondolowski	15
2018	MLS	34	4	21	9	49	71	−22	21	0.62	12th	23rd	DNQ	R4	DNQ		19,032	(Netherlands) Danny Hoesen	12
2019	MLS	34	13	16	5	52	55	−3	44	1.29	8th	15th	DNQ	Ro16	DNQ		18,781	(United States) Chris Wondolowski	15
2020	MLS	23	8	9	6	35	51	−16	30	1.30	8th	16th	R1	NH	MLS is Back Tournament	QF	15,112	(United States) Chris Wondolowski	9
2021	MLS	34	10	13	11	46	54	−8	41	1.21	10th	21st	DNQ	NH	DNQ		12,101	(Mexico) Javier Eduardo López	12
2022	MLS	34	8	15	11	52	69	−17	35	1.03	14th	26th	DNQ	RD16	DNQ		12,911	(United States) Jeremy Ebobisse	17
2023	MLS	34	10	10	14	39	43	−4	44	1.29	9th	16th	WC	R3	2023 Leagues Cup	GS	18,041	(Argentina) Cristian Espinoza	13
2024	MLS	34	6	25	3	41	78	−37	21	0.62	14th	29th	DNQ	Ro16	2024 Leagues Cup	Ro16	18,782	(Norway) Amahl Pellegrino	7
2025	MLS	34	11	15	8	60	63	−3	41	1.21	10th	20th	DNQ	QF	DNQ		18,153	(Venezuela) Josef Martínez	14
Total	—	759	278	294	187	1,040	1,104	−64	972	1.29	—	—	—	—	—		—	(United States) Chris Wondolowski	171

1. Avg. attendance only includes statistics from regular season matches.
2. Top goalscorer(s) includes all goals scored in the regular season, MLS Cup Playoffs, U.S. Open Cup, MLS is Back Tournament, CONCACAF Champions League, FIFA Club World Cup, and other competitive continental matches.
