= 1987 San Jose Earthquakes season =

San Jose Earthquakes
1987 season
- Coach: Barney Boyce
- Stadium: Spartan Stadium
- Western Soccer Alliance: 3rd
- WSA Playoffs: Final
- National Challenge Cup: Did not enter
- Top goalscorer: Joe Mihaljevic (7)

The 1987 San Jose Earthquakes season was the fourteenth overall for the Earthquakes franchise, and the club's third in the Western Soccer Alliance. The Earthquakes finished the season in third place, then shut out the second place Seattle Storm in the Wild Card playoff game. In the Final, they were defeated by the San Diego Nomads, 3-1.

== Squad ==
The 1987 squad

Note: Flags indicate national team as defined under FIFA eligibility rules; some limited exceptions apply. Players may hold more than one non-FIFA nationality.

No.	Pos.	Nation	Player
—	FW	USA	Sean Blakeman
—	DF	USA	Barney Boyce
—	MF	USA	Mike Brewin
—	FW	USA	Rino Chimienti
—	FW		James Cole
—	GK	USA	Kurt Devlin
—	DF	USA	John Doyle
—	MF	USA	David Gold
—	MF	USA	Robert Grouchau
—	DF	SWE	Stefan Hansson
—	GK		Nicholas Hatzopoulos
—	MF		Jadir Henrique
—	FW		Jorge Ilbanez
—	MF	USA	Steve Lammie

No.	Pos.	Nation	Player
—	FW		Alberto Luna
—	DF	USA	Tim Martin
—	GK	USA	Danny Mendoza
—	FW	USA	Joe Mihaljevic
—	FW	USA	Ronnie Morriss
—	FW	USA	Don Murphy
—	DF	USA	John Nicholson
—	FW	USA	Dave Palic
—	FW	USA	George Pastor
—		USA	Steve Sellers
—	DF	USA	Joe Siveria
—	FW		Frank Van den Brand Horninge
—	DF	USA	Chris Wentzien
—	DF	USA	Robbie Zipp

== Competitions ==
=== Western Soccer Alliance ===
==== Season ====
Date	Opponent	Venue	Result	Scorers
March 16, 1987	California Kickers	A	3–2	Mihaljevic, Henrique, Wiskel
March 21, 1987	F.C. Seattle	H	3–1	Wiskel, Palic, Henrique
March 29, 1987	California Kickers	H	1–2	Blakeman
April 4, 1987	San Diego Nomads	H	1–2 (aet)	Mihaljevic
April 11, 1987	Los Angeles Heat	A	2–0	Pastor, Mihaljevic
April 12, 1987	San Diego Nomads	A	0–0*	
April 26, 1987	F.C. Portland	H	5–1	Mihaljevic (3), Martin, Zipp
May 3, 1987	Los Angeles Heat	H	6–0	Pastor (3), Mihaljevic, Blakeman, Murphy
May 16, 1987	F.C. Portland	A	0–1	
May 17, 1987	F.C. Seattle	A	0–3	

==== Playoffs ====
Date	Opponent	Venue	Result	Scorers
June 7, 1987	F.C. Seattle	A	3–0	Palic, Henrique, Pastor
June 14, 1987	San Diego Nomads	A	1–2	Henrique

* = Penalty kicks

==== Standings ====
Place	Team	GP	W	L	OW	OL	PW	PL	GF	GA	Points
1	San Diego Nomads	10	6	4	1	0	1	1	17	9	31
2	F.C. Seattle	10	5	5	1	1	1	1	16	14	31
3	San Jose Earthquakes	10	5	5	1	1	1	1	21	13	31
4	F.C. Portland	10	5	5	2	0	0	0	9	16	24
5	Los Angeles Heat	10	5	5	0	1	0	0	9	15	24
6	California Kickers	10	4	6	0	2	2	0	11	16	23
