= 1986 San Jose Earthquakes season =

San Jose Earthquakes
1986 season
- Coach: Steve Litt
- Stadium: Spartan Stadium
- Western Soccer Alliance: 6th
- National Challenge Cup: Did not enter
- Top goalscorer: Chance Fry (8)

The 1986 San Jose Earthquakes season was the thirteenth overall for the franchise, and the club's second in the Western Soccer Alliance. The Earthquakes finished the season in sixth place. With no playoffs, the first-place Hollywood Kickers were league champions.

== Squad ==
The 1986 squad

Note: Flags indicate national team as defined under FIFA eligibility rules; some limited exceptions apply. Players may hold more than one non-FIFA nationality.

No.	Pos.	Nation	Player
—	DF	USA	Barney Boyce
—	FW	USA	Chance Fry
—	FW		Jorge Ilbanez
—	DF	USA	Chris McCargo
—	DF	USA	Steve McCargo
—	FW	USA	Ronnie Morriss
—	DF	ENG	Mark Nickeas
—	MF		Oscar Padilla
—	FW	USA	George Pastor
—	FW	USA	Jose Ramos
—	MF	USA	Mark Arya
—	MF	USA	Hamid Ghods-Gooya
—	FW		Long Tran

No.	Pos.	Nation	Player
—	DF	USA	Dev Rendler
—	FW	USA	Tony Salciccia
—	FW	USA	Derek Sanderson
—	DF	USA	Joe Siveria
—	MF		Costas Skouras
—	GK	USA	John Spurgeon
—	GK	USA	Hunter Stern
—	FW	VIE	Dzung Tran
—	FW	USA	Frank Van den Brand Horninge
—	MF	USA	Ray Wilson
—	MF		Maricio Gonzalez
—	DF	USA	Robbie Zipp

== Competitions ==
=== Western Soccer Alliance ===
==== Match results ====
Date	Opponent	Venue	Result	Scorers
May 18, 1986	San Diego Nomads	A	1–1	Fry
May 29, 1986	Dundee	H	0–4	
June 1, 1986	Manchester City	H	0–1	
June 7, 1986	Hollywood Kickers	A	3–2	Fry (2), Sanderson
June 14, 1986	Los Angeles Heat	A	1–1	Tran
June 22, 1986	F.C. Portland	H	2–0	S. McCargo (2)
June 24, 1986	Edmonton Brick Men	A	3–3	S. McCargo (2), Fry
June 27, 1986	F.C. Seattle	A	0–1	
June 29, 1986	F.C. Portland	A	1–3	C. McCargo
July 3, 1986	Hollywood Kickers	H	2–6	S. McCargo, Fry
July 12, 1986	Los Angeles Heat	H	2–2	Sanderson, Pastor
July 19, 1986	San Diego Nomads	H	4–1	Fry (2), Sanderson, Salciccia
August 1, 1986	Edmonton Brick Men	H	3–4	Sanderson (2), Salciccia
August 15, 1986	F.C. Seattle	H	1–3	Fry

==== Standings ====
Pos	Team	Pld	W	T	L	GF	GA	GD	Pts
3	F.C. Portland	14	6	2	6	19	22	−3	20
4	Los Angeles Heat	14	4	5	5	15	14	+1	17
5	San Diego Nomads	14	4	4	6	18	20	−2	16
6	San Jose Earthquakes	14	3	4	7	23	32	−9	13
7	Edmonton Brick Men	14	3	3	8	18	28	−10	12

Source: A-League Archive
Rules for classification: 1) points; 2) goal difference; 3) number of goals scored.

Standings include games played against Manchester City and Dundee FC.
