= Heritage Cup (MLS) =

American soccer rivalry

- Location: Western United States
- Teams: San Jose Earthquakes; Seattle Sounders FC
- First meeting: May 19, 1974; NASL; Seattle 3–1 San Jose
- Latest meeting: May 13, 2026; MLS regular season Seattle 3–2 San Jose

Statistics
- Total meetings: 84
- Most wins: Seattle (37)
- All-time series: Seattle: 37; Ties: 18; San Jose: 29
- Largest victory: Seattle 7–1 San Jose (MLS, September 10, 2020)

The Heritage Cup is an annual cup rivalry between Major League Soccer (MLS) teams San Jose Earthquakes and Seattle Sounders FC. Both teams carried their names forward from their North American Soccer League (NASL) predecessors. However, the rivalry is also geographical as the two cities are based on the West Coast.

== Club namesakes ==
Major League Soccer	North American Soccer League
San Jose Earthquakes	San Jose Earthquakes
Seattle Sounders FC	Seattle Sounders

== History ==
=== Cup history ===
The Heritage Cup trophy was conceived and designed by San Jose Earthquakes fan Rob Stevenson and was commissioned by San Jose's Soccer Silicon Valley Community Foundation in collaboration with Seattle Sounders FC supporters. The competition began in 2009 when the expansion Seattle began play, becoming the second MLS team named after their North American Soccer League counterpart – San Jose having been the first when they inherited the Earthquakes name in time for the 2000 season.

=== MLS times ===
The original Earthquakes and Sounders sides did have a rivalry while playing in the NASL. However, it did not completely resurface during the 2009 season with fans of both teams viewing other clubs as bigger rivals. That season, the first MLS meeting of the teams was not considered for the competition due to the schedule consisting of two games in Seattle and only one in San Jose. Seattle won the initial meeting at home 2–0 and the second 2–1. The San Jose Earthquakes won the inaugural cup on goals scored after a 4–0 home victory on August 2, 2009.

Present and future MLS teams that carry on the name of their market's NASL predecessors are eligible to join the competition. However, when the Portland Timbers and Vancouver Whitecaps FC became eligible to compete for the cup upon joining the league in 2011, both teams' supporters elected not to participate. They left open the possibility of joining if a couple of additional eligible teams join MLS, thereby better differentiating the Heritage Cup from the Cascadia Cup.

The 2012 MLS Season brought an unbalanced schedule for the first time since 2009. The rules to the cup therefore reverted to counting only the last two matches between the teams, the way it will be counted in any season that has an unbalanced schedule.

Due to the COVID-19 pandemic in 2020 the organizers sent out the following proposal:

Gentlemen,

Here is the latest information for you about the 2020 Heritage Cup, the annual competition between San Jose and Seattle. The Quakes have not won the Cup since 2015, while Seattle displayed the Cup and used it in-stadium to promote their anniversary last year. As you know, the Heritage Cup is a joint operation between San Jose fans and some Sounders fans. This year presents a special challenge and we could only come up with one viable option, which is to use the July 10 San Jose vs Seattle game in Orlando as the Heritage Cup game for 2020. We delayed until now to arrange this, hoping to hear about the league schedule, but that didn't happen. So this will be a one-game competition, on neutral ground.

We hope that this might also help the MLS Is Back tournament as well. If you can help us get information about this game and the Heritage Cup to MLS and especially to the ESPN producers and broadcast team as quickly as possible, this might be an additional storyline they can use in their telecast to add a little more drama to the game.

The match ended in a 0–0 draw and the San Jose Earthquakes, group B winners in the MLS is Back Tournament, were awarded the Heritage Cup for 2020.

For 2021 there was an unbalanced three-game regular season schedule between the two competing MLS teams. The Heritage Cup was awarded based on the results of the final two of three matches of each participating team, with each team hosting one match, namely the July 31 match hosted by Seattle Sounders FC and the September 29 match hosted by San Jose Earthquakes. Seattle regained the Cup with their 3–1 victory in San Jose.

== Statistics ==
As of May 13, 2026

Competition	Matches	Wins		Draws
Competition	Matches	San Jose	Seattle	Draws
NASL (1974–1983)	24	9	10	5
WACS/WSA/WSL (1985–1988)	8	2	6	0
MLS (2009–present)	44	15	18	11
League totals (regular season)	76	26	34	16
WSA playoffs	2	1	1	0
League totals (playoffs)	2	1	1	0
U.S. Open Cup	6	2	2	2
U.S. Open Cup totals	6	2	2	2
All-time totals	84	29	37	18

=== MLS era honours ===
San Jose	Competition	Seattle
Domestic
2	MLS Cup	2
2	Supporters' Shield	1
—	U.S. Open Cup	4
4	Aggregate	7
Continental and Worldwide
—	CONCACAF Champions League	1
—	Leagues Cup	1
—	Campeones Cup	—
0	Aggregate	2
4	Total aggregate	9

== Results ==
Competitive matches only

=== NASL era ===
For statistical purposes, matches that went to shootouts are counted as draws. Matches ending with a shootout are denoted with *.

Season	Date	Competition	Stadium	Home team	Result	Away team	Attendance	Series	Ref.
1974	May 19	NASL	Memorial Stadium	Seattle Sounders	3–1	San Jose Earthquakes	12,463	SEA 1–0–0	
1974	June 30	NASL	Spartan Stadium	San Jose Earthquakes	2–2*	Seattle Sounders	13,638	SEA 1–0–1	
1975	June 21	NASL	Memorial Stadium	Seattle Sounders	5–1	San Jose Earthquakes	16,710	SEA 2–0–1	
1975	July 12	NASL	Spartan Stadium	San Jose Earthquakes	2–2*	Seattle Sounders	18,672	SEA 2–0–2	
1975	August 9	NASL	Memorial Stadium	Seattle Sounders	1–2	San Jose Earthquakes	17,925	SEA 2–1–2	
1976	June 4	NASL	Kingdome	Seattle Sounders	1–2	San Jose Earthquakes	20,774	Tied 2–2–2	
1976	June 20	NASL	Spartan Stadium	San Jose Earthquakes	2–1	Seattle Sounders	18,637	SJ 3–2–2	
1977	April 23	NASL	Spartan Stadium	San Jose Earthquakes	2–0	Seattle Sounders	17,047	SJ 4–2–2	
1977	May 21	NASL	Kingdome	Seattle Sounders	0–1	San Jose Earthquakes	23,647	SJ 5–2–2	
1978	April 30	NASL	Spartan Stadium	San Jose Earthquakes	1–0	Seattle Sounders	13,421	SJ 6–2–2	
1978	May 13	NASL	Kingdome	Seattle Sounders	3–1	San Jose Earthquakes	24,273	SJ 6–3–2	
1979	May 12	NASL	Kingdome	Seattle Sounders	2–1	San Jose Earthquakes	16,564	SJ 6–4–2	
1979	May 19	NASL	Spartan Stadium	San Jose Earthquakes	0–1	Seattle Sounders	16,109	SJ 6–5–2	
1980	April 19	NASL	Spartan Stadium	San Jose Earthquakes	0–1	Seattle Sounders	12,875	Tied 6–6–2	
1980	May 3	NASL	Kingdome	Seattle Sounders	4–0	San Jose Earthquakes	19,360	SEA 7–6–2	
1981	June 20	NASL	Kingdome	Seattle Sounders	1–0	San Jose Earthquakes	17,586	SEA 8–6–2	
1981	August 8	NASL	Spartan Stadium	San Jose Earthquakes	3–0	Seattle Sounders	13, 472	SEA 8–7–2	
1982	April 11	NASL	Kingdome	Seattle Sounders	0–0*	San Jose Earthquakes	4,954	SEA 8–7–3	
1982	July 3	NASL	Kingdome	Seattle Sounders	5–4	San Jose Earthquakes	9,549	SEA 9–7–3	
1982	August 7	NASL	Spartan Stadium	San Jose Earthquakes	1–2	Seattle Sounders	11,471	SEA 10–7–3	
1983	June 15	NASL	Kingdome	Seattle Sounders	1–1*	Golden Bay Earthquakes	6,346	SEA 10–7–4	
1983	July 6	NASL	Spartan Stadium	Golden Bay Earthquakes	2–2*	Seattle Sounders	9,970	SEA 10–7–5	
1983	July 13	NASL	Kingdome	Seattle Sounders	2–5	Golden Bay Earthquakes	6,058	SEA 10–8–5	
1983	September 3	NASL	Spartan Stadium	Golden Bay Earthquakes	2–1	Seattle Sounders	14,721	SEA 10–9–5	

=== Alliance era ===
Season	Date	Competition	Stadium	Home team	Result	Away team	Attendance	Series	Ref.
1985	July 7	WACS	Memorial Stadium	F.C. Seattle	3–1	San Jose Earthquakes	1,773	SEA 1–0–0	
1985	August 2	WACS	Spartan Stadium	San Jose Earthquakes	1–0	F.C. Seattle	3,212	Tied 1–1–0	
1986	June 27	WSA	Memorial Stadium	F.C. Seattle	1–0	San Jose Earthquakes	1,124	SEA 2–1–0	
1986	August 15	WSA	Spartan Stadium	San Jose Earthquakes	1–3	F.C. Seattle	1,300	SEA 3–1–0	
1987	March 21	WSA	Spartan Stadium	San Jose Earthquakes	3–1	F.C. Seattle Storm		SEA 3–2–0	
1987	May 17	WSA	Memorial Stadium	F.C. Seattle Storm	3–0	San Jose Earthquakes		SEA 4–2–0	
1987	June 7	WSA Playoffs	Memorial Stadium	F.C. Seattle Storm	0–3	San Jose Earthquakes		SEA 4–3–0	
1988	July 1	WSA	Memorial Stadium	Seattle Storm	3–0	San Jose Earthquakes		SEA 5–3–0	
1988	July 17	WSA	Spartan Stadium	San Jose Earthquakes	1–3	Seattle Sounders	2,804	SEA 6–3–0	
1988	July 30	WSA Championship	Memorial Stadium	Seattle Storm	5–0	San Jose Earthquakes	5,600	SEA 7–3–0	

=== 1996–2008 ===
Results from when the two teams played each other between 1996 and 2008.

Season	Date	Competition	Stadium	Home team	Result	Away team	Attendance	Series	Ref.
2002	July 17	U.S. Open Cup	Interbay Stadium	Seattle Sounders	3–4	San Jose Earthquakes	1,275		
2003	August 5	U.S. Open Cup	Husky Soccer Stadium	Seattle Sounders	1–0	San Jose Earthquakes	2,510		

=== MLS era ===
For statistical purposes, matches that went to shootouts are counted as draws. Matches ending with a shootout are denoted with *.

Heritage Cup match‡

Season	Date	Competition	Stadium	Home team	Result	Away team	Attendance	Series	Ref.
2009	April 25	MLS	Qwest Field	Seattle Sounders FC	2–0	San Jose Earthquakes	28,838	SEA 1–0–0	
2009	June 13‡	MLS	Qwest Field	Seattle Sounders FC	2–1	San Jose Earthquakes	28,999	SEA 2–0–0	
2009	August 2‡	MLS	Buck Shaw Stadium	San Jose Earthquakes	4–0	Seattle Sounders FC	9,919	SEA 2–1–0	
2010	May 22‡	MLS	Qwest Field	Seattle Sounders FC	0–1	San Jose Earthquakes	35,953	Tied 2–2–0	
2010	July 31‡	MLS	Buck Shaw Stadium	San Jose Earthquakes	0–1	Seattle Sounders FC	10,351	SEA 3–2–0	
2011	April 2‡	MLS	Buck Shaw Stadium	San Jose Earthquakes	2–2	Seattle Sounders FC	10,276	SEA 3–2–1	
2011	October 15‡	MLS	CenturyLink Field	Seattle Sounders FC	2–1	San Jose Earthquakes	64,140	SEA 4–2–1	
2012	March 31	MLS	CenturyLink Field	Seattle Sounders FC	0–1	San Jose Earthquakes	38,458	SEA 4–3–1	
2012	June 26	U.S. Open Cup	Kezar Stadium	San Jose Earthquakes	0–1	Seattle Sounders FC	7,219	SEA 5–3–1	
2012	August 11‡	MLS	Buck Shaw Stadium	San Jose Earthquakes	2–1	Seattle Sounders FC	10,744	SEA 5–4–1	
2012	September 22‡	MLS	CenturyLink Field	Seattle Sounders FC	1–2	San Jose Earthquakes	38,948	Tied 5–5–1	
2013	March 23	MLS	Buck Shaw Stadium	San Jose Earthquakes	1–0	Seattle Sounders FC	10,525	SJ 6–5–1	
2013	May 11‡	MLS	CenturyLink Field	Seattle Sounders FC	4–0	San Jose Earthquakes	38,880	Tied 6–6–1	
2013	July 13‡	MLS	Buck Shaw Stadium	San Jose Earthquakes	1–0	Seattle Sounders FC	10,525	SJ 7–6–1	
2014	May 17	MLS	CenturyLink Field	Seattle Sounders FC	1–0	San Jose Earthquakes	49,746	Tied 7–7–1	
2014	June 24	U.S. Open Cup	Starfire Sports	Seattle Sounders FC	1–1*	San Jose Earthquakes	4,023	Tied 7–7–2	
2014	August 2‡	MLS	Levi's Stadium	San Jose Earthquakes	1–0	Seattle Sounders FC	48,765	SJ 8–7–2	
2014	August 20‡	MLS	CenturyLink Field	Seattle Sounders FC	1–1	San Jose Earthquakes	38,509	SJ 8–7–3	
2015	March 14	MLS	CenturyLinkField	Seattle Sounders FC	2–3	San Jose Earthquakes	39,175	SJ 9–7–3	
2015	June 20‡	MLS	CenturyLink Field	Seattle Sounders FC	0–2	San Jose Earthquakes	39,971	SJ 10–7–3	
2015	September 12‡	MLS	Avaya Stadium	San Jose Earthquakes	1–1	Seattle Sounders FC	18,000	SJ 10–7–4	
2016	May 7‡	MLS	CenturyLink Field	Seattle Sounders FC	2–0	San Jose Earthquakes	39,570	SJ 10–8–4	
2016	September 10‡	MLS	Avaya Stadium	San Jose Earthquakes	1–1	Seattle Sounders FC	18,000	SJ 10–8–5	
2017	April 8‡	MLS	Avaya Stadium	San Jose Earthquakes	1–1	Seattle Sounders FC	18,000	SJ 10–8–6	
2017	June 28	U.S. Open Cup	Avaya Stadium	San Jose Earthquakes	2–1	Seattle Sounders FC	13,442	SJ 11–8–6	
2017	July 23‡	MLS	CenturyLink Field	Seattle Sounders FC	3–0	San Jose Earthquakes	43,528	SJ 11–9–6	
2018	July 25‡	MLS	Avaya Stadium	San Jose Earthquakes	0–1	Seattle Sounders FC	16,478	SJ 11–10–6	
2018	October 28‡	MLS	CenturyLink Field	Seattle Sounders FC	2–1	San Jose Earthquakes	42,617	Tied 11–11–6	
2019	April 24‡	MLS	CenturyLink Field	Seattle Sounders FC	2–2	San Jose Earthquakes	37,722	Tied 11–11–7	
2019	September 29‡	MLS	Avaya Stadium	San Jose Earthquakes	0–1	Seattle Sounders FC	18,000	SEA 12–11–7	
2020	July 10‡	MLS is Back	ESPN Sports Complex	Seattle Sounders FC	0–0	San Jose Earthquakes	0 (Note: No spectators due to COVID-19 pandemic)	SEA 12–11–8	
2020	September 10‡	MLS	CenturyLink Field	Seattle Sounders FC	7–1	San Jose Earthquakes	0	SEA 13–11–8	
2020	October 18	MLS	Earthquakes Stadium	San Jose Earthquakes	0–0	Seattle Sounders FC	0	SEA 13–11–9	
2020	November 8	MLS	CenturyLink Field	Seattle Sounders FC	4–1	San Jose Earthquakes	0	SEA 14–11–9	
2021	May 12	MLS	PayPal Park	San Jose Earthquakes	0–1	Seattle Sounders FC	5,000 (Note: Limited capacity due to social distancing due to COVID-19 pandemic)	SEA 15–11–9	
2021	July 31‡	MLS	Lumen Field	Seattle Sounders FC	0–1	San Jose Earthquakes	32,704	SEA 15–12–9	
2021	September 29‡	MLS	PayPal Park	San Jose Earthquakes	1–3	Seattle Sounders FC	11,361	SEA 16–12–9	
2022	April 23‡	MLS	PayPal Park	San Jose Earthquakes	4–3	Seattle Sounders FC	12,467	SEA 16–13–9	
2022	May 11	U.S. Open Cup	Starfire Sports	Seattle Sounders	2–2*	San Jose Earthquakes	3,773	SEA 16–13–10	
2022	October 9‡	MLS	Lumen Field	Seattle Sounders	2–2	San Jose Earthquakes	33,910	SEA 16–13–11	
2023	May 31‡	MLS	Lumen Field	Seattle Sounders	0–1	San Jose Earthquakes	30,013	SEA 16–14–11	
2023	July 12‡	MLS	PayPal Park	San Jose Earthquakes	2–0	Seattle Sounders FC	13,577	SEA 16–15–11	
2024	March 23‡	MLS	PayPal Park	San Jose Earthquakes	3–2	Seattle Sounders FC	16,109	Tied 16–16–11	
2024	September 18‡	MLS	Lumen Field	Seattle Sounders	2–2	San Jose Earthquakes	29,326	Tied 16–16–12	
2025	March 29‡	MLS	PayPal Park	San Jose Earthquakes	1–1	Seattle Sounders FC	15,228	Tied 16–16–13	
2025	July 19‡	MLS	Lumen Field	Seattle Sounders	3–2	San Jose Earthquakes	30,129	SEA 17–16–13	
2026	March 15‡	MLS	PayPal Park	San Jose Earthquakes	0–1	Seattle Sounders FC	18,251	SEA 18–16–13	
2026	May 13‡	MLS	Lumen Field	Seattle Sounders	3–2	San Jose Earthquakes	28,726	SEA 19–16–13	

=== Cup winners by season ===
Year	Winner	SJ points	SEA points	Notes
2009	San Jose Earthquakes	3	3	San Jose Earthquakes won 5–2 on aggregate.
2010	Seattle Sounders FC	3	3	Seattle Sounders FC won based on MLS standings position after 1–1 tie on aggregate.
2011	Seattle Sounders FC	1	4	Seattle Sounders FC won on points.
2012	San Jose Earthquakes	6	0	San Jose Earthquakes won on points.
2013	Seattle Sounders FC	3	3	Seattle Sounders FC won 4–1 on aggregate.
2014	San Jose Earthquakes	4	1	San Jose Earthquakes won on points.
2015	San Jose Earthquakes	4	1	San Jose Earthquakes won on points.
2016	Seattle Sounders FC	1	4	Seattle Sounders FC won on points.
2017	Seattle Sounders FC	1	4	Seattle Sounders FC won on points.
2018	Seattle Sounders FC	0	6	Seattle Sounders FC won on points.
2019	Seattle Sounders FC	1	4	Seattle Sounders FC won on points.
2020	San Jose Earthquakes	1	4	San Jose Earthquakes won based on the tiebreaker rule at MLS is Back.
2021	Seattle Sounders FC	3	3	Seattle Sounders FC won 3–2 on aggregate.
2022	San Jose Earthquakes	4	1	San Jose Earthquakes won on points.
2023	San Jose Earthquakes	6	0	San Jose Earthquakes won on points.
2024	San Jose Earthquakes	4	1	San Jose Earthquakes won on points.
2025	Seattle Sounders FC	1	4	Seattle Sounders FC won on points.
2026	Seattle Sounders FC	0	6	Seattle Sounders FC won on points.

=== Western Conference standings finishes ===
Sounders Earthquakes

P.	2009	2010	2011	2012	2013	2014	2015	2016	2017	2018	2019	2020	2021	2022	2023	2024	2025	2026
1				1		1												
2			2						2	2	2	2	2		2			
3	3			3														
4		4			4		4	4								4		4
5																	5	
6		6			6				6									
7			7				7											
8	8										8	8						8
9						9		9							9			
10													10				10	
11														11				
12										12								
13																		
14														14		14		
15																		

• Total: Seattle with 16 higher finishes, San Jose with 2.

== Notes ==
1. These matches were the determined matches to be specifically for the Heritage Cup cup competition between 2009 and 2011.
2. These matches were the determined matches to be specifically for the Heritage Cup cup competition between 2012 and 2014.

== See also ==
- 49ers–Seahawks rivalry
