= 1987 Western Soccer Alliance =

Western Soccer Alliance -1987 Season-
- Season: 1987
- Champions: San Diego Nomads (1st title)
- Premiers: San Diego Nomads (1st title)
- Top goalscorer: Joe Mihaljevic (7 goals)

Final league standings for the 1987 Western Soccer Alliance season.

== History ==
Prior to the season, the Edmonton Brick Men left the league to join the new Canadian Soccer League. This left the Alliance with six teams, which retained its regular season single table standings, but added a post-season playoff to determine the league champion for 1987. The San Diego Nomads won both the regular season and playoff titles.

== League standings ==
Place	Team	GP	W	L	OW	OL	PW	PL	GF	GA	Points	Qualification
1	San Diego Nomads (C)	10	6	4	1	0	1	1	17	9	31	Playoff final
2	F.C. Seattle	10	5	5	1	1	0	1	16	14	31	Playoff semifinal
3	San Jose Earthquakes	10	5	5	1	1	0	1	21	13	31	Playoff semifinal
4	F.C. Portland	10	5	5	0	1	0	0	9	15	24	
5	Los Angeles Heat	10	5	5	2	0	0	0	9	16	24	
6	California Kickers	10	4	6	0	2	2	0	11	16	23	

(C) Champion

== Playoffs ==
=== Bracket ===
Wild Card Semi-final			1987 WSA Final
			1	San Diego Nomads	3
2	F.C. Seattle	0	3	San Jose Earthquakes	1
3	San Jose Earthquakes	3

=== Wild card ===
June 7, 1987
1:00 PM PST

F.C. Seattle (WA)	0–3	San Jose Earthquakes (CA)
		4' Dave Palic; Jadir Henrique; George Pastor

Memorial Stadium, Seattle, Washington
Referee: (USA)

=== Final ===
June 14, 1987
7:30 PM PST

San Diego Nomads (CA)	3–1	San Jose Earthquakes (CA)
Paul Stumpf (yellow card) 31'; Steve Black 53'; Mario Gonzalez 62'; Steve Black 85'	Report	31' Jadir Henrique

Southwestern College, Chula Vista, California
Attendance: 2,000
Referee: (USA)

== Points leaders ==
Rank	Scorer	Club	Goals	Assists	Points
1	Joe Mihaljevic	San Jose Earthquakes	7	2	16
2	Marcelo Balboa	San Diego Nomads	6	0	12
3	Geoff Wall	F.C. Seattle	4	4	12
4	Mike Enneking	F.C. Seattle	5	0	10
5	George Pastor	San Jose Earthquakes	4	2	10
6	John Hamel	F.C. Seattle	3	1	7
7	John Gerrard	Los Angeles Heat	3	1	7
8	Jadir Henrique	San Jose Earthquakes	2	3	7
9	Steve Boardman	San Diego Nomads	2	3	7
10	John Sissons	San Diego Nomads	3	0	6
11	Amir Darabi	California Kickers	3	0	6

== Honors ==
- MVP: Brent Goulet
- Leading goal scorer: Joe Mihaljevic
- Leading goalkeeper: Anton Nistl
- First Team All League

Goalkeeper: Anton Nistl
Defenders: Steve Boardman, Barney Boyce, Daryl Green, Robbie Zipp
Midfielders: Jadir Henrique, George Pastor, Geoff Wall
Forwards: Brent Goulet, Tim Martin, Joe Mihaljevic

- Second Team All League

Goalkeeper: Mike Lane
Defenders: Marcelo Balboa, Arturo Velazco, Eric Biefeld, Chris Wentzien
Midfielders: Steve Black, John Hamel, Richard Torres
Forwards: Scott Benedetti, John Gerard, John Sissons
