= 1988 Western Soccer Alliance =

Western Soccer Alliance -1988 Season-
- Season: 1988
- Champions: F.C. Seattle Storm (1st title)
- Premiers: F.C. Seattle Storm (1st title)
- Top goalscorer: Scott Benedetti (8 goals)

Final league standings for the 1988 Western Soccer Alliance season.

== League standings ==
Pos	Team	Pld	W	L	GF	GA	GD	BP	Pts	Qualification
1	F.C. Seattle Storm (C)	12	10	2	25	10	+15	21	83	WSA Playoff Final
2	San Diego Nomads	12	9	3	23	17	+6	19	76	WSA Playoff Semi-final
3	San Jose Earthquakes	12	7	5	20	19	+1	14	61	WSA Playoff Semi-final
4	Los Angeles Heat	12	7	5	20	17	+3	14	61	
5	California Kickers	12	3	9	17	28	−11	8	35	
6	F.C. Portland	12	1	11	16	32	−16	5	22	
(Canada)	Vancouver 86ers	6	3	3	12	7	+5	11	32	Not eligible for playoffs (Note: Canadian clubs played league matches, which did have implications on their opponents' standings, but were not actually included in the official standings.)
(Canada)	Calgary Kickers	6	2	4	8	11	−3	8	24	Not eligible for playoffs

Rules for classification: Six points per win. One point per goal up to three points per game.
(C) Champions

== Playoffs ==
=== Bracket ===
Wild Card Semi-final			1988 WSA Final
			1	F.C. Seattle Storm	5
2	San Diego Nomads	1(5)	3	San Jose Earthquakes	0
3	San Jose Earthquakes	1(6)

=== Semifinal ===
July 23, 1988
7:30 PM PST

San Diego Nomads (CA)	1–1 (aet)	San Jose Earthquakes (CA)
Steve Boardman (yellow card) 27', (goal) 90'; Paul Dougherty (yellow card) 63'; Steve Black (yellow card) 83'	Report	Tomás Boy 20' (pen.); Mike Whitlatch (yellow card) 63'; Joe Silveira (yellow card) 63'; Mike Getchell (red card) 63'
Penalties
Mario Gonzalez (penalty missed); Steve Boardman (penalty missed); Jerome Watson (penalty scored); Steve Black (penalty missed); Mike Bradley (penalty scored); Rene Ortiz (penalty scored); Jeff Ward (penalty scored); Greg Schwartz (penalty scored); Brad Stratton (penalty missed)	5–6	(penalty missed) Alex Basso; (penalty scored) Chris Dangerfield; (penalty missed) Joe Silveira; (penalty missed) John Nicholson; (penalty scored) Tomás Boy; (penalty scored) Frank Van Den Brand Horninge; (penalty scored) Chris Wentzien; (penalty scored) Mike Whitlatch; (penalty scored) Jacques LaDouceur

Southwestern College, San Diego, California
Attendance: 2,000
Referee: Nabil Noujaim (USA)

=== Final ===
July 30, 1988
7:30 PM PST

F.C. Seattle Storm (WA)	5–0	San Jose Earthquakes (CA)
Bobby Bruch 1', 8'; John Hamel 27', (red card) 71'; Bernie James (yellow card) 32'; Peter Hattrup 46', (yellow card) 68'; Chance Fry 63'	Report	John Nicholson (yellow card) 1'; Mike Whitlatch (yellow card) 25'; Van Den Brand Horning (yellow card) 68'

Memorial Stadium, Seattle, Washington
Attendance: 5,600
Referee: Rainier Graumann (USA)

== Points leaders ==
Rank	Scorer	Club	Goals	Assists	Points
1	Scott Benedetti	F.C. Portland	8	0	16
2	Justin Fashanu	Los Angeles Heat	5	4	14
3	Eddie Henderson	F.C. Seattle	5	4	14
4	Jerome Watson	San Diego Nomads	6	1	13
5	Peter Hattrup	F.C. Seattle	6	1	13
6	Billy Thompson	Los Angeles Heat	5	3	13
7	Frank van den Brand Hornige	San Jose Earthquakes	5	1	11
8	Chance Fry	F.C. Seattle	3	3	9
9	Brendan Murphy	California Kickers	4	0	8
10	Mario Gonzalez	San Diego Nomads	4	0	8
11	Grant Gibbs	F.C. Seattle	4	0	8
11	Dzung Tran	San Jose Earthquakes	2	4	8
11	Ridal Fernandez	Los Angeles Heat	3	1	7
11	John Sissons	San Diego Nomads	3	1	7
11	Thor Lee	California Kickers	3	0	6
11	Alex Basso	San Jose Earthquakes	3	0	6
11	Eric Phillippi	F.C. Portland	3	0	6

== Honors ==
- MVP: Marcelo Balboa
- Leading goal scorer: Scott Benedetti
- Leading goalkeeper: Jeff Koch
- First Team All League

Goalkeeper: Todd Strobeck
Defenders: Marcelo Balboa, Grant Gibbs, Arturo Velazco, Jeff Stock
Midfielders: Peter Hattrup, Billy Thompson, Tomás Boy
Forwards: Justin Fashanu, Eddie Henderson, Abuelo Cruz

- Second Team All League

Goalkeeper: Bob Ammann
Defenders: Mario Gonzalez, Daryl Green, Danny Pena, Martín Vásquez
Midfielders: Chris Dangerfield, Dzung Tran, Jerome Watson
Forwards: Scott Benedetti, Chance Fry, John Sissons
