= 1985 San Jose Earthquakes season =

San Jose Earthquakes
1985 season
- Coach: Laurie Calloway
- Stadium: Spartan Stadium
- Western Alliance Challenge Series: 1st
- National Challenge Cup: Did not enter
- Top goalscorer: Chris Dangerfield (2)

The 1985 San Jose Earthquakes season was the twelfth overall for the Earthquakes franchise. They played in the four-team Western Alliance Challenge Series, which would become the Western Soccer Alliance in 1986. The Earthquakes finished in first place and were league champions.

== Squad ==
The 1985 squad

Note: Flags indicate national team as defined under FIFA eligibility rules; some limited exceptions apply. Players may hold more than one non-FIFA nationality.

No.	Pos.	Nation	Player
—	MF	USA	Mark Arya
—	DF	USA	Billy Crook
—	MF	ENG	Chris Dangerfield
—	MF	USA	Fred Hamel
—	MF	USA	Germain Iglesias
—	FW		Jorge Ilbanez
—	DF	USA	Chris McCargo
—	DF	ENG	Mark Nickeas
—	FW		Jesus Perez
—	FW		Jose Ramos

No.	Pos.	Nation	Player
—	GK	USA	Bob Rigby
—	DF	USA	Dev Rendler
—	MF	USA	Dan Salvemimi
—	FW	USA	Derek Sanderson
—	MF	USA	Tim Schulz
—	MF	USA	Mike Simon
—	DF	USA	Joe Siveria
—	GK	USA	Hunter Stern
—	FW	VIE	Dzung Tran
—	FW		Frank Van den Brand Horninge

== Competitions ==
=== Western Alliance Challenge Series ===
==== Match results ====
Date	Opponent	Venue	Result	Scorers
July 6, 1985	Victoria Riptide	A	1–0	own goal
July 7, 1985	F.C. Seattle	A	1–3	Dangerfield
July 13, 1985	F.C. Portland	H	3–2	Dangerfield (2), Tran
July 17, 1985	F.C. Portland	A	1–2	Tran
July 20, 1985	Canada	H	1–1	Sanderson
August 2, 1985	F.C. Seattle	H	1–0	Morales
August 17, 1985	Victoria Riptide	H	2–1	Hamel, Dangerfield

==== Standings ====
Place	Team	GP	W	L	T	GF	GA	Points
1	San Jose Earthquakes	7	4	2	1	10	9	13
2	Victoria Riptide	7	3	3	1	16	11	10
3	F.C. Seattle	7	3	3	1	13	13	10
4	F.C. Portland	7	1	4	2	8	16	5
