= Steve Sengelmann =

American soccer player

Personal information
- Full name: Steve Sengelmann
- Date of birth: July 14, 1965 (age 61)
- Place of birth: Naples, Italy
- Height: 6 ft 0 in (1.83 m)
- Position: Defender

Youth career
- 1979–1984: Culver-Palisades
- 1983, 1985–1988: Cal State Los Angeles

Senior career*
Years	Team	Apps	(Gls)
1987–1988	California Kickers	?	(2)
1990–1991	Salt Lake Sting		
~1995~	Salt Lake City Flamengo		
1996–1997	El Paso Patriots		

International career
1986	United States	2	(0)
- * Club domestic league appearances and goals

Steve Sengelmann (Sangleman or Sengleman in various sources) (born July 14, 1965) is a former soccer player who played as a defender. He spent two season in the Western Soccer Alliance, American Professional Soccer League, and USISL. Born in Italy, he earned two caps for the United States national team.

== Professional ==
Sengelmann graduated from Santa Monica High School in 1983. He then attended Cal State Los Angeles After starting his freshman season in 1983, he moved to Germany. He spent a year and a half in Germany where he trained with the Bundeswehr German National Army Team in Duisburg. After turning down an offer with a club team in the Oberliga he returned to the United States where he played for CSLA from 1985 to 1988. He played for Team West in the 1985 National Sports Festival earning a gold medal and was selected to the U.S. soccer team at the World University Games. He also played for Team West in the 1986 and 1987 US Olympic Festivals, winning a Silver and Bronze medal respectively. In 1987, Sengelmann signed with the California Kickers of the Western Soccer Alliance during the collegiate off season. He remained with the Kickers through the 1988 season. In February 1990, he signed with the Salt Lake Sting of the American Professional Soccer League and played two seasons with them. In 1996 and 1997, he was with the El Paso Patriots of the USISL A-League.

== National team ==
Sengelmann earned two caps with the U.S. national team. Both came in the February 1986 Miami Cup. The first was a scoreless tie with Canada on February 5. The second was a 1–1 tie with Uruguay two days later. In that game, he came on for John Stollmeyer.
