= Thor Lee =

American soccer player (born 1965)

Personal information
- Date of birth: June 5, 1965 (age 61)
- Place of birth: Long Beach, California, United States
- Height: 6 ft 0 in (1.83 m)
- Position: Defender

Youth career
- 1984–1987: CSU Northridge

Senior career*
Years	Team	Apps	(Gls)
1987–1989	California Kickers		
1989–1990	Los Angeles Lazers (indoor)	31	(1)
1990	Los Angeles Heat		
1991	Salt Lake Sting	11	(0)
1993–1994	Los Angeles Salsa		
1994–1995	Wichita Wings (indoor)	4	(2)
1996	D.C. United	2	(0)
1996	San Diego Sockers (indoor)	28	(5)
1997	Anaheim Splash (indoor)		
1997–1998	Buffalo Blizzard (indoor)	14	(3)
1998	Sacramento Knights (indoor)		
- * Club domestic league appearances and goals

Thor Lee (born June 5, 1965) is a retired U.S. soccer defender who played professionally in several U.S. leagues including one season in Major League Soccer.

Lee attended CSU Northridge where he played on the school's NCAA Division II soccer team from 1984 to 1987. In 1987, CSU Northridge went to the National Championship where it fell to Southern Connecticut State University. Lee was a 1986 second team and a 1987 first team All-American. He graduated with a bachelor's degree in Health Sciences.

In 1987, Lee spent the collegiate off-season with the California Kickers in the Western Soccer Alliance. He remained with the Kickers through the 1989 season. In June 1988, the Los Angeles Lazers selected Lee in the third round of the Major Indoor Soccer League draft. The Lazers folded at the end of the season and in July 1990 the San Diego Sockers selected Lee in the dispersal draft, but did not sign him. 1990, the WSA merged with the American Soccer League to form the American Professional Soccer League. Lee moved to the Los Angeles Heat for the 1990 APSL season. The Heat folded at the end of the season and Lee joined the Salt Lake Sting for the 1991 season. On April 2, 1993, Lee signed with the Los Angeles Salsa and spent the 1993 and 1994 APSL seasons with them. In the fall of 1994, he signed with the Wichita Wings in the National Professional Soccer League. On February 7, 1996, D.C. United selected Lee in the fifth round (fiftieth overall) in the 1996 MLS Inaugural Player Draft. He played two games before being waived on April 16, 1996. He was then signed by the San Diego Sockers of the Continental Indoor Soccer League five days later. The Sockers folded at the end of the season and the Anaheim Splash selected him in the dispersal draft. He spent the 1997 season in Anaheim. In February 1998, he joined the Buffalo Blizzard of the NPSL on loan from the Splash. In 1998, he played for the Sacramento Knights in the Premier Soccer Alliance.

Lee was a sales associate with Ramsey-Shilling Commercial Real Estate in Southern California.

Thor Lee is currently a VP with Avison Young Commercial Real Estate in Southern California.
