= Chris Dangerfield =

English footballer (born 1955)

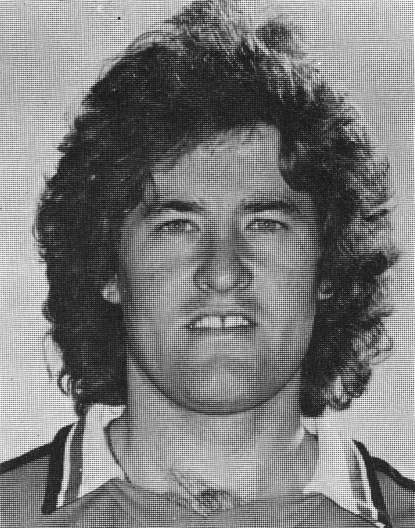
- Dangerfield in 1979

Personal information
- Full name: Christopher George Dangerfield
- Date of birth: 9 August 1955 (age 71)
- Place of birth: Coleshill, Warwickshire, England
- Height: 6 ft 0 in (1.83 m)
- Positions: Forward; midfielder

Youth career
- 1972–1976: Wolverhampton Wanderers

Senior career*
Years	Team	Apps	(Gls)
1975–1976	→ Portland Timbers (loan)	36	(6)
1976	Port Vale	2	(0)
1976–1977	Coventry City	0	(0)
1977	Las Vegas Quicksilvers	16	(2)
1977	Team Hawaii	6	(0)
1978	Tulsa Roughnecks	1	(0)
1978	California Surf	22	(0)
1979–1981	Los Angeles Aztecs	99	(69)
1982	San Jose Earthquakes	45	(25)
1982–1984	Golden Bay Earthquakes (indoor)	75	(57)
1984–1988	Minnesota Strikers (indoor)	159	(60)
1985	San Jose Earthquakes		
1988	San Jose Earthquakes		
- San Jose Oaks
Total		461+	(219+)

International career
1973–1974	England Youth	2	(0)

Managerial career
- 1992–1996: San Jose Oaks
- * Club domestic league appearances and goals

Christopher George Dangerfield (born 9 August 1955) is an English former footballer who spent most of his career in the United States.

He began his career in England before playing ten seasons in the North American Soccer League and at least one in the Western Soccer Alliance. A former England under-20 international, he played for Wolverhampton Wanderers, Portland Timbers, Port Vale, Las Vegas Quicksilvers, Team Hawaii, Tulsa Roughnecks, California Surf, Los Angeles Aztecs, San Jose Earthquakes / Golden Bay Earthquakes, Minnesota Strikers, and San Jose Oaks.

== Playing career ==
Dangerfield grew up in Sutton Coldfield and attended John Willmott School. Preferring rugby as a youth, he began playing football around 14. In 1972, he began his career with Wolverhampton Wanderers, but made no first-team appearances. In 1975, he went on loan with the expansion Portland Timbers of the North American Soccer League, and scored four goals in 14 games in the 1975 season. Timbers reached Soccer Bowl '75, losing 2–0 to the Tampa Bay Rowdies at the Spartan Stadium. He was kept on by manager Vic Crowe for the 1976 season, scoring another two goals in 22 appearances. He was then released from his contract at Molineux by Wolves boss Bill McGarry. He returned to England to have a trial with Port Vale in August 1976, but only made two substitute appearances at Vale Park in the Third Division for Roy Sproson's "Valiants". He then signed with Coventry City, where he spent the entire 1976–77 season with the team's reserve team in The Central League and then turned down a new contract offer from manager Jimmy Hill to search for first-team football elsewhere.

In 1977, he moved permanently to the United States and signed with Derek Trevis's Las Vegas Quicksilvers, who boasted the legendary Eusébio on their playing staff. Dangerfield scored two goals in 16 games in the 1977 season. He was traded to Team Hawaii, playing six games. At the end of the season, both Quicksilvers and Team Hawaii were disbanded. In 1978, he began the season with the Tulsa Roughnecks, but saw time in only one game before being sent to the California Surf, where he made 22 appearances. In 1979, he signed with the Los Angeles Aztecs, scoring nine goals in 22 games in his first season at the Los Angeles Memorial Coliseum. He then scored 15 goals in 12 games in the 1979–80 Indoor season. He scored two goals in 19 games in the 1980 season, before hitting 35 goals in 16 matches in the 1980–81 Indoor season. He scored eight goals in 30 appearances in the 1981 season.

Dangerfield moved to the San Jose Earthquakes in 1982, and scored 16 goals in 15 games in the 1981–82 Indoor season and then nine goals in 30 appearances in the 1982 season. At the end of the 1982 season, the Earthquakes were renamed the Golden Bay Earthquakes. They entered the Major Indoor Soccer League for the winter indoor season. Dangerfield was the 15th leading scorer with 48 games, 52 goals, 20 assists, and 72 points. The Earthquakes returned to the NASL for the 1983 outdoor seasons. Dangerfield injured his knee during the 1983–84 NASL indoor season and lost the entire 1984 outdoor season. In February 1985, the Kansas City Comets of the Major Indoor Soccer League made an offer to purchase Dangerfield's contract from the Earthquakes. The deal fell through when Dangerfield was unable to pass a physical.

In March 1985, he signed as a free agent with the Minnesota Strikers of the MISL. He scored four goals in seven games in 1984–85, 24 goals in 47 games in 1985–86, 20 goals in 49 appearances in 1986–87, and hit 12 goals in 52 matches in the 1987–88 season. In June 1985, he returned to the renamed San Jose Earthquakes for the Western Soccer Alliance. He played one more season, 1988, for the Earthquakes in the Western Soccer Alliance after which he retired from playing professionally. However, he continued to play for the San Jose Oaks, eventually also becoming the team's coach.

== Coaching career ==
In 1992, he became the coach of the amateur San Jose Oaks, taking them to the 1992 U.S. Open Cup title. He remained in that position until 1996.

He holds a USSF "National-A" coaching licence and has coached for the De Anza Soccer Club of Cupertino, Saratoga, West San Jose, area of California, and has worked as the head coach of teams in the US Soccer Development Academy League until the end of the 2011 season.

After coaching for De Anza Force's club and Academy teams, Chris worked with Comcast SportsNet Bay Area as a color commentator for the San Jose Earthquakes, working from 1996 to 1999 and returning to the role in 2014. He was inducted into the San Jose Earthquakers Hall of Fame in March 2018.

== Career statistics ==
Appearances and goals by club, season and competition
Club	Season	League			FA Cup		Other		Total	
Club	Season	Division	Apps	Goals	Apps	Goals	Apps	Goals	Apps	Goals
Port Vale	1976–77	Third Division	2	0	0	0	0	0	2	0
Portland Timbers (loan)	1975	NASL	14	4	—		—		14	4
Portland Timbers (loan)	1976	NASL	22	2	—		—		22	2
Portland Timbers (loan)	Total		36	6	0	0	0	0	36	6
Las Vegas Quicksilvers	1977	NASL	16	2	—		—		16	2
Team Hawaii	1977	NASL	6	0	—		—		6	0
Tulsa Roughnecks	1978	NASL	1	0	—		—		1	0
California Surf	1978	NASL	22	0	—		—		22	0
Los Angeles Aztecs	1979	NASL	22	9	—		—		22	9
Los Angeles Aztecs	1979–80	NASL Indoor	12	15	—		—		12	15
Los Angeles Aztecs	1980	NASL	19	2	—		—		19	2
Los Angeles Aztecs	1980–81	NASL Indoor	16	35	—		—		16	35
Los Angeles Aztecs	1981	NASL	30	8	—		—		30	8
Los Angeles Aztecs	Total		0	0	0	0	0	0	0	0
San Jose Earthquakes	1981–82	NASL Indoor	15	16	—		—		15	16
San Jose Earthquakes	1982	NASL	30	9	—		—		30	9
San Jose Earthquakes	Total		0	0	0	0	0	0	0	0
Golden Bay Earthquakes	1982–83	MISL	48	52	—		—		48	52
Golden Bay Earthquakes	1983	NASL	30	5	—		—		30	5
Golden Bay Earthquakes	1984	NASL	0	0	—		—		0	0
Golden Bay Earthquakes	Total		78	57	0	0	0	0	78	57
Minnesota Strikers	1984–85	MISL	11	4	—		—		11	4
San Jose Earthquakes	1985	WSL								
Minnesota Strikers	1985–86	MISL	47	24	—		—		47	24
Minnesota Strikers	1986–87	MISL	49	20	—		—		49	20
Minnesota Strikers	1987–88	MISL	52	12	—		—		52	12
Minnesota Strikers	Total		148	56	0	0	0	0	148	56
San Jose Earthquakes	1988	WSA								

== Honours ==
Individual

- San Jose Earthquakes Hall of Fame inductee: March 2018

Portland Timbers

- Soccer Bowl runner-up: 1975

San Jose Oaks

- US Open Cup: 1992
