= 1984 Golden Bay Earthquakes season =

Golden Bay Earthquakes
1984 season
- Coach: Dragan Popović
- Stadium: Spartan Stadium
- NASL: Division: 5th Overall: 8th
- NASL Playoffs: Did not qualify
- National Challenge Cup: Did not enter
- Top goalscorer: Steve Zungul (20)
- Average home league attendance: 10,676

The 1984 Golden Bay Earthquakes season was the club's eleventh as a franchise in the North American Soccer League, then the top tier of American soccer. The Earthquakes finished in fifth place in the Western Division. The league folded at the end of the season, and the team would then participate in the four-team 1985 Western Alliance Challenge Series, which led to the formal establishment of the Western Soccer Alliance in 1986.

== Squad ==
The 1984 squad

Note: Flags indicate national team as defined under FIFA eligibility rules; some limited exceptions apply. Players may hold more than one non-FIFA nationality.

No.	Pos.	Nation	Player
1	GK	USA	Bob Rigby
3	DF	USA	Mike Hunter
4	MF	USA	Charlie Fajkus
5	DF	ENG	Steve Litt
6	MF	CAN	Mike Sweeney
7	FW	ENG	Chris Dangerfield
9	MF	USA	Germain Iglesias
10	FW	NED	Jan Goossens
11	FW	YUG	Steve Zungul
12	MF	MEX	Leonardo Cuellar
13	FW	USA	Tim Bartro
14	DF	YUG	Mihalj Keri

No.	Pos.	Nation	Player
—	MF	USA	Eric Tate
16	FW	ENG	Godfrey Ingram
17	FW	ARG	Ricardo Alonso
17	DF	USA	Hayden Knight
18	MF	CHI	Manny Rojas
19	DF	CAN	George Katakalidis
20	FW	CAN	Branko Šegota
21	MF	USA	Fernando Clavijo
22	DF	USA	Barney Boyce
23	FW	CAN	Igor Vrablic
25	MF	USA	Tim Schulz
26	DF	URU	Edgardo Lopez
27	GK	USA	Chris Sigler
31	GK	NIR	Bill Irwin

== Competitions ==
=== NASL ===
==== Season ====
Date	Opponent	Venue	Result	Scorers
May 19, 1984	San Diego Sockers	H	2–2*	Hunter, Zungul
May 23, 1984	Vancouver Whitecaps	A	3–5	Rojas, Zungul (2)
May 27, 1984	Chicago Sting	H	2–3	Zungul (2)
June 3, 1984	San Diego Sockers	A	2–2*	Rojas, Zungul
June 8, 1984	Minnesota Strikers	A	1–2	Sweeney
June 13, 1984	New York Cosmos	H	1–3	Rojas
June 22, 1984	Tulsa Roughnecks	A	1–3	Segota
June 30, 1984	Tampa Bay Rowdies	H	9–0	Vrablic (2), Zungul (4), Segota (2), Sweeney
July 4, 1984	Tampa Bay Rowdies	A	1–2	Zungul
July 8, 1984	Tulsa Roughnecks	H	4–1	Zungul, Goossens (2), Vrablic
July 11, 1984	Toronto Blizzard	H	2–0	Goossens, Segota
July 14, 1984	Minnesota Strikers	H	2–3	Zungul (2)
July 21, 1984	Chicago Sting	A	2–4	Alonso, Segota
July 25, 1984	Tulsa Roughnecks	H	1–3	Zungul
August 8, 1984	Chicago Sting	A	6–3	Segota (3), Zungul, Alonso, Vrablic
August 12, 1984	Toronto Blizzard	A	3–5	Segota (3)
August 18, 1984	Vancouver Whitecaps	H	2–2*	Ingram, Segota
August 22, 1984	Vancouver Whitecaps	H	3–2	Segota, Lopez, Ingram
August 25, 1984	Toronto Blizzard	H	2–2*	Segota (2)
August 29, 1984	Tampa Bay Rowdies	A	4–5	Segota, Zungul (3)
September 1, 1984	Minnesota Strikers	A	2–1	Segota, Fajkus
September 3, 1984	New York Cosmos	H	3–4	Clavijo, Zungul, Segota
September 8, 1984	San Diego Sockers	H	1–2	Cuellar
September 12, 1984	New York Cosmos	A	1–0	Ingram

* = Shootout

==== Western Division ====
Western Division	W	L	GF	GA	BP	Pts	Home	Road
San Diego Sockers	14	10	51	42	40	118	9-3	5-7
Vancouver Whitecaps	13	11	51	48	43	117	10-2	3-9
Minnesota Strikers	14	10	40	44	35	115	8-4	6-6
Tulsa Roughnecks	10	14	42	46	38	98	8-4	2-10
Golden Bay Earthquakes	8	16	61	62	49	95	4-8	4-8
