= Lee Cornwell =

English-American soccer player

Personal information
- Date of birth: 15 March 1958 (age 68)
- Place of birth: London, England
- Position: Defender

Senior career*
Years	Team	Apps	(Gls)
1979–1981	California Surf (indoor)	11	(2)
1981–1982	Baltimore Blast (indoor)	29	(1)
1982–1987	Los Angeles Lazers (indoor)	153	(31)
1989	Leyton Orient		
- * Club domestic league appearances and goals

Lee Cornwell is an English retired-American football defender who spent most of his career in the American indoor leagues.

In 1980, Cornwell moved to the United States from Leyton Orient to sign with the California Surf of the North American Soccer League. He played the 1979-1981 NASL indoor/outdoor season with the Surf. In 1981, Cornwell moved to the Baltimore Blast of the Major Indoor Soccer League. In 1982, he moved to the Los Angeles Lazers. The Lazers retired 1 November 1988. Cornwell became an American citizen during his time with the Lazers. In 1989, he spent one season with the California Kickers of the Western Soccer League.
