= Richard Berg (disambiguation) =

Richard Berg could refer to:

- Richard Berg (1943–2019), American game designer
- Dick Berg (1922–2009), American screenwriter
- Dick Berg (1944–2018), American sports promoter and athlete
- Rick Berg (born 1959), American politician

== See also ==
- Richard Bergh (1858–1919), Swedish artist and critic
- Dick Burg (born 1936), American hockey player
- Richard Borg, American game designer
