= Fred Hamel =

American soccer player and coach

Personal information
- Date of birth: February 2, 1962 (age 64)
- Place of birth: Seattle, Washington, U.S.
- Height: 5 ft 8 in (1.73 m)
- Position: Midfielder

Youth career
- 1970–1980: Lake City Hawks

Senior career*
Years	Team	Apps	(Gls)
1980–1982	Seattle Sounders	0	(0)
1980–1982	Seattle Sounders (indoor)	4	(1)
1985	San Jose Earthquakes	7	(1)
- * Club domestic league appearances and goals

Fred Hamel is an American retired soccer midfielder who played professionally in the North American Soccer League and Western Soccer Alliance. He is currently a professor at the University of Puget Sound.

Hamel was selected for the U.S. National U-17 team in 1977, touring Germany with the team. As a teenager, he also was selected twice to play in the National Sports Festival in Colorado Springs. His youth team, the Lake City Hawks, won the Washington State championship seven times in 10 years, and the team also won a West Coast Championship in 1974, defeating state and provincial championship teams from California, Oregon, and British Columbia. In 1980, Hamel captained the Bishop Blanchet High School soccer team to the state championship, and in 2016 was named to Bishop Blanchet's Athletic Hall of Fame.

Hamel was drafted by the Seattle Sounders of the North American Soccer League in 1980, along with Brian Schmetzer. Hamel played with the team for three seasons, from 1980 to 1982, under coaches Alan Hinton and Bobby Howe. He never cracked the first team during the outdoor seasons, but saw several games during two indoor seasons. In 1985, he played for the San Jose Earthquakes in the Western Alliance Challenge Series. The Earthquakes won the Western Alliance league that year with Hamel as a starting midfielder. That year Hamel also earned his bachelor's degree from the University of Santa Clara.

Hamel has two master's degrees from the University of Chicago. He completed a Ph.D. in education from the University of Washington (Seattle) in 2000. He has coached several youth teams (including his kids' teams), and high school teams in Illinois and Washington State. He is married to Catherine Hamel, and has two children, Tedra and Will.
