= Dave Palic =

American soccer player

David Palic
Personal information
- Full name: David Palic
- Place of birth: San Gabriel, California, U.S.
- Positions: Midfielder; forward

Youth career
- 1985–1988: Santa Clara Broncos

Senior career*
Years	Team	Apps	(Gls)
1987	San Jose Earthquakes	?	(1)
1989–1990	San Francisco Bay Blackhawks		
1992	San Jose Oaks		
- * Club domestic league appearances and goals

David Palic is an American retired soccer player who played professionally in the Western Soccer Alliance and American Professional Soccer League.

== High School ==
Palic graduated from La Salle High School where he played from 1982 - 1985. In 1985 he was awarded the California Interscholastic Federation (CIF) 1-A Division Player of the Year. While playing for the Lancers he won two CIF SS 1-A Championships in 1983 and 1984. Palic is a member of the La Salle HS Athletic Hall of Fame.

== College ==
Palic graduated from Santa Clara University, playing on the men's soccer team from 1985 to 1988. He was a 1988 Second Team NCAA All American. He was an All West Coast Conference (WCC) selection in 1986 and 1988. He is 2nd on the all time SCU men's soccer career assist list, with 34 assists. He is 8th on the all time SCU men's soccer career points list, with 62 points (goals and assists). In 1989 he received the Victor Corsignlia Award, given annually to Santa Clara University's top senior male athlete. In 2001, Palic was inducted into the SCU Athletic Hall of Fame. In 2017, Palic's #16 jersey received honorary recognition.

== Professional ==
In 1987, Palic spent the collegiate off season with the San Jose Earthquakes of the Western Soccer Alliance. In 1989, he turned professional with the San Francisco Bay Blackhawks. He continued to play for the Blackhawks in 1990. While playing for the San Jose Oaks in 1992 they won the 1992 U.S. Open Cup with Palic scoring the opening goal. The San Jose Oaks where the last amateur team to win the US Open Cup.
