= Eric Biefeld =

American soccer player

Personal information
- Date of birth: c. 1965 (age 60–61)
- Place of birth: United States
- Height: 6 ft 0 in (1.83 m)
- Position: Defender

Youth career
- 1983–1986: UCLA

Senior career*
Years	Team	Apps	(Gls)
1987–1990	Los Angeles Heat		

International career
1986	United States	2	(0)
- * Club domestic league appearances and goals

Eric Biefeld is a former U.S. soccer defender. He played three seasons in the Western Soccer Alliance and one season in the American Professional Soccer League. He also earned two caps with the U.S. national team in 1986.

== Youth and college ==
Biefeld, brother to U.S. women's national team defender Joy Fawcett (née Biefeld) grew up in Huntington Beach, California. He played on the Edison High School boys' soccer team, later entering the teams Hall of Fame. After graduating from Edison in 1983, Biefeld entered UCLA. In his four seasons with the Bruins, he was a mainstay of the team's defense, earning 1985 and 1986 team defensive MVP recognition and second team All-American honors in 1986. In 1985, the Bruins won the NCAA Men's Soccer Championship.

== Los Angeles Heat ==
In 1987, Biefeld signed with the expansion Los Angeles Heat of the Western Soccer Alliance (WSA). He spent four seasons with the Heat. In 1990, they played in the American Professional Soccer League which was created by the merger of the WSA and American Soccer League. The Heat folded following the 1990 season.

== National team ==
In 1986, Biefeld was called up to the U.S. national team for the Miami Cup. He earned two caps at the tournament. In the first game, the U.S. played to a scoreless tie with Canada on February 5, 1986, and a 1–1 tie with Uruguay two days later.

== Post soccer career ==
Biefeld is currently a firefighter in La Mirada, California and plays on the Los Angeles County Firefighter soccer team.
