= Jacques LaDouceur =

American soccer player-coach (born 1959)

Personal information
- Date of birth: April 29, 1959 (age 67)
- Place of birth: Port-au-Prince, Haiti
- Position: Forward

College career
Years	Team	Apps	(Gls)
1980–1981	Howard Bison		

Senior career*
Years	Team	Apps	(Gls)
1982–1984	Panionios	58	(1)
1985–1992	San Diego Sockers (indoor)	279	(51)
1988	San Jose Earthquakes		
1992–1993	Chicago Power (indoor)	4	(0)

International career
1984–1985	United States	10	(2)

Managerial career
- Palomar College
- * Club domestic league appearances and goals

Jacques LaDouceur (born April 29, 1959) is a retired soccer player who played as a forward. He played two seasons in Greece before returning to the U.S. for eight seasons of indoor soccer. Born in Haiti, he earned ten caps, scoring two goals, with the United States national team in 1984 and 1985.

== Youth and college ==
Born in Port-au-Prince, Haiti, LaDouceur grew up the youngest of four children raised by a single mother. In 1967, his mother gained an opportunity to move to the U.S. to work in the textile industry. In the fall of 1969, his mother had saved enough money to move the family to the U.S. and on December 12, 1969, LaDouceur landed at Kennedy Airport in New York City. He went on to attend Fulton-Montgomery Community College in Johnstown, New York before transferring to Howard University.

== Professional career ==
LaDouceur began his professional career with Greek First Division club Panionios in 1982. In 1984, he returned to the U.S. where he signed with the San Diego Sockers of Major Indoor Soccer League (MISL). He remained with the Sockers for eight seasons, leaving the team after the 1992-1993 CISL Championship Series with the Dallas Sidekicks. During those years, the Sockers won six league championships. LaDouceur moved to the Chicago Power of the National Professional Soccer League to finish their 1992 - 1993 season. He played four games with the Power, scoring one goal, then retired. In 1988, he spent the summer outdoor season with the San Jose Earthquakes in the Western Soccer Alliance.

== National team ==
LaDouceur earned ten caps and scored two goals with the U.S. national team in 1984 and 1985. He made his debut in an October 9, 1984 victory over El Salvador. He came on as a substitute for Perry Van der Beck and promptly scored. Jeff Hooker also scored a goal in the game, his first for the national team, making this one of the few games where two players score while earning their first caps. He played every national team game following that appearance, up to an April 4, 1985 tie with Canada. His next, and last game, with the national team came a month later in a June 16, 1985 loss to England.

== Coaching ==
After retiring from playing professionally, LaDouceur joined the coaching ranks. He is both a youth coach as well as the women's coach at Palomar College, a community college in San Diego, California.
