= Mike Getchell =

American soccer player

Personal information
- Full name: Michael D. Getchell
- Date of birth: May 6, 1963 (age 63)
- Place of birth: Lake Oswego, Oregon, U.S.
- Position: Midfielder

Youth career
- 1981–1985: UCLA Bruins

Senior career*
Years	Team	Apps	(Gls)
1986	Hollywood Kickers		
1987–1988	Tacoma Stars (indoor)	28	(0)
1988	San Jose Earthquakes		
1988–1989	Monterrey	19	(0)
1989–1990	Atlanta Attack (indoor)		
1990	Los Angeles Heat		
1991	Colorado Foxes	4	(0)
- * Club domestic league appearances and goals

Mike Getchell is an American retired soccer midfielder who played professionally in the Western Soccer Alliance, Mexican Primera División, Major Indoor Soccer League and American Professional Soccer League. He is the Managing Director Latin America for DHR International.

== Youth ==
Born in the United States, Getchell spent much of his youth in Brazil where his Episcopalian father was serving. Government unrest forced the Getchells to leave Brazil and they moved to Portland, Oregon, before settling in northern California for Mike's senior year of high school. Getchell Trained with the Golden Gate Gales (ASL) youth team, and played for the Berkley Mavericks soccer club where he was approached by Sigi Schmid. He attended UCLA, playing on the men's soccer team from 1981 to 1985. He lost the entire 1983 season due to injury. In 1985, Getchell and his teammates won the NCAA Men's Division I Soccer Championship. He graduated with a bachelor's degree in political science and international relations. Getchell later earned an MBA through a joint degree program run by Business School São Paulo and the University of Toronto.

== Professional ==
In 1986, Getchell turned professional with the Hollywood Kickers of the Western Soccer Alliance. In June 1986, the Tacoma Stars selected Getchell in the second round of the Major Indoor Soccer League draft. However, a torn anterior cruciate ligament prevented him from playing for over a year. He spent the 1987-1988 MISL season in Tacoma. In 1988, he played for the San Jose Earthquakes. During his time in San Jose, teammates Tomás Boy and Francisco Javier Cruz recommended him to C.F. Monterrey of the Mexican Primera División. Getchell played the 1988–1989 season in Monterrey where he became the first native-born American to play in the modern era. A coaching change led to Getchell falling out of the lineup and in the 1989-1990 pre-season, Monterrey released him. He returned to the United States and joined the Atlanta Attack of the American Indoor Soccer Association. In 1990, he played for the Los Angeles Heat in the American Professional Soccer League. In 1991, he finished his career with the Colorado Foxes.
