= Martín Vásquez =

Mexican-American soccer player and coach (born 1963)

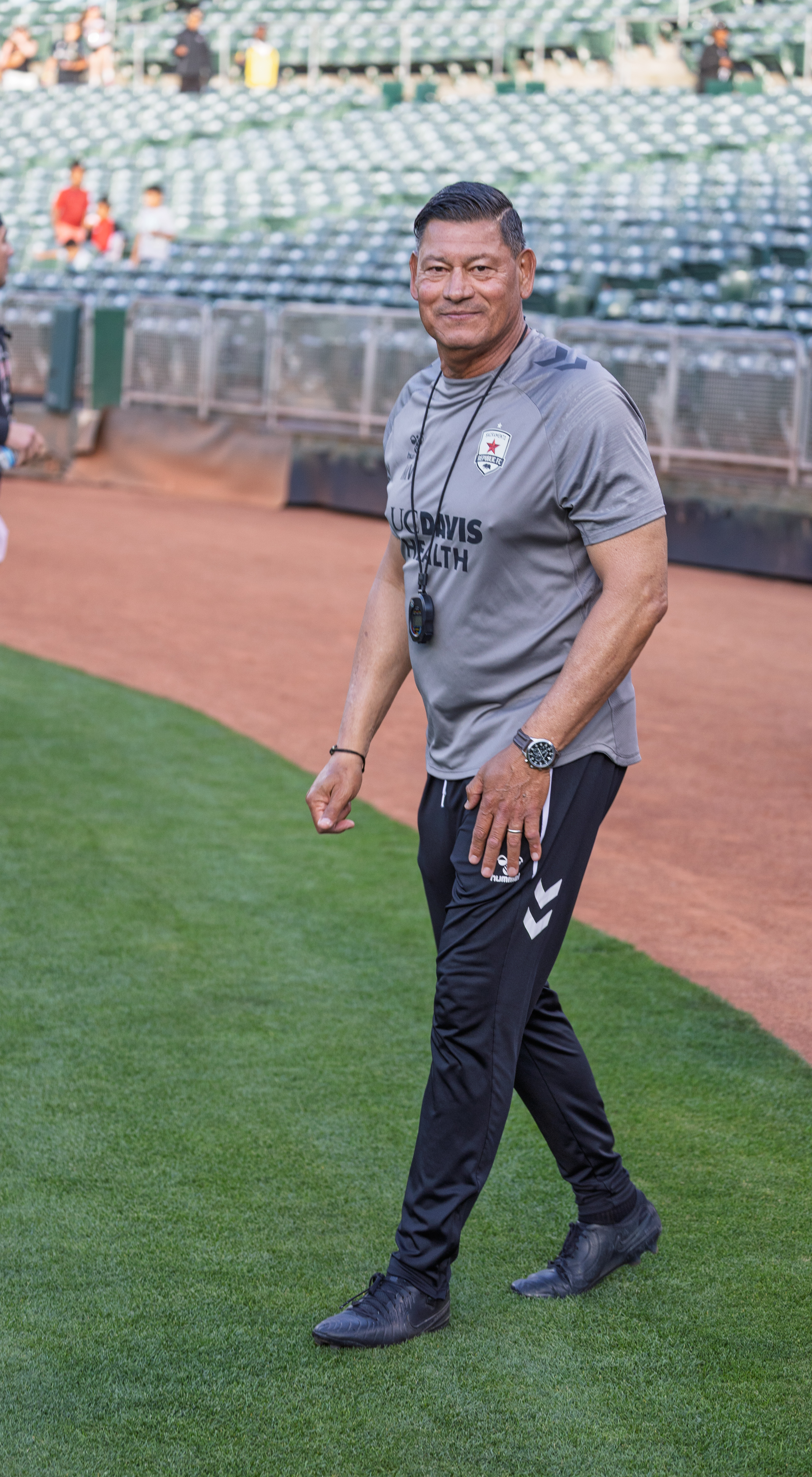
- Vásquez with the Sacramento Republic in 2026

Personal information
- Full name: Martín Vásquez Gómez
- Date of birth: December 24, 1963 (age 62)
- Place of birth: Yahualica, Jalisco, Mexico
- Height: 6 ft 0 in (1.83 m)
- Positions: Defender; midfielder

Youth career
- 1984: Tecos UAG

College career
Years	Team	Apps	(Gls)
1981–1983	Cal State Los Angeles		(67)

Senior career*
Years	Team	Apps	(Gls)
1984–1986	Los Angeles Lazers (indoor)	39	(5)
1986–1988	California Kickers		(4+)
1986–1988	Memphis Storm (indoor)	63	(44)
1988–1990	UdeG	62	(2)
1990–1991	Puebla	36	(2)
1991–1992	Veracruz	25	(0)
1992–1996	Atlas	119	(1)
1996–1997	Tampa Bay Mutiny	59	(9)
1998	San Jose Clash	28	(0)
1999	Orange County Zodiac	19	(0)
Total		450+	(67+)

International career
1990–1992	Mexico	3	(0)
1996–1997	United States	7	(0)

Managerial career
- 1999–2000: Cal Poly Pomona (assistant)
- 2001–2002: San Diego Spirit (assistant)
- 2004: LA Galaxy (assistant)
- 2005–2007: Chivas USA (assistant)
- 2008–2009: Bayern Munich (assistant)
- 2010: Chivas USA
- 2011–2014: United States (assistant)
- 2019: Real Monarchs
- 2021: Houston Dynamo (assistant)
- 2022–2023: Central Valley Fuego
- 2024–: Sacramento Republic (assistant)
- * Club domestic league appearances and goals

Martín Vásquez Gómez (born December 24, 1963) is a professional soccer coach and former player. The first of seven players to have played for both the United States and Mexico, he has served as a coach since retiring. He is currently an assistant coach for USL Championship club Sacramento Republic.

== Playing career ==
=== Youth and college ===
Vasquez and his family moved to Los Angeles at age 12. He attended Alhambra High School in Alhambra, California, where he was a high school All-American soccer player. After high school, he returned to Mexico to briefly play for the B side of the Leones Negros de Guadalajara.

In 1981, Vasquez entered California State University, Los Angeles, playing on the men's soccer team from 1981 to 1983. During his first two years, he spent the college off-season with Cojumatlan in the San Gabriel Valley Soccer League, in El Monte, California.

=== Club ===
In the fall of 1984, Vasquez signed with the Los Angeles Lazers of the Major Indoor Soccer League. He then played for the Hollywood Kickers of the Western Soccer Alliance. That fall, he joined the Memphis Storm in the American Indoor Soccer Association, where he scored seventeen goals and added nineteen assists in twenty-three games, ranking second on the league's points list.

In 1987, Vasquez returned to the Kickers, now renamed the California Kickers. In 1988, Cachorros de la Universidad de Guadalajara signed the player, based on the recommendation of Hugo Salcedo, president of the Kickers. In 1990–91, he represented Puebla, moving to Veracruz in the following campaign.

In 1992, Vasquez joined Atlas, leaving four years later to return to the United States, with the establishment of Major League Soccer. That year, he was allocated to the Tampa Bay Mutiny, and spent two season with them, before rounding out his MLS career with the San Jose Clash in 1998. The next year, he played for the Orange County Zodiac in the USL A-League.

=== Mexico ===
Vasquez played three games with the Mexico national team one of them being against Colombia in April 1990 under manager Manuel Lapuente and the other two against the CIS, during César Luis Menotti's spell as coach. However, none of the matches he played for his birth nation were FIFA-sanctioned.

=== United States ===
Vasquez received American citizenship in 1996. Subsequently, he was called up to the United States national team by Steve Sampson, going on to earn seven caps in a two-year span. His debut came on December 21, 1996, against Guatemala (2–2 away draw), in a 1998 World Cup qualifier, and he last appeared in the home 4–2 victory over El Salvador, for the same competition, on November 16, 1997. He started the game, then came off in the 63rd minute for Mike Sorber.

== Coaching career ==
After retiring from his playing career, Vasquez worked as assistant coach with Cal Poly Pomona and the women's team San Diego Spirit. He also coached the Damien High School boys' team for two seasons. After one season as assistant with the Los Angeles Galaxy, he joined newly created MLS team Chivas USA in the same capacity, on January 2, 2005.

Between July 2008 and April 2009, Vasquez worked as the assistant to Jürgen Klinsmann at German club Bayern Munich. He left when Klinsmann was dismissed due to bad results. Vasquez was hired to his first head coaching job on December 2, 2009, at former club Chivas.

Vasquez was released from his duties following a season, which saw the Goats miss the playoffs for the first time since its 2005 expansion campaign.

Vasquez was recalled by Klinsmann after the latter was named head coach of the United States men's national team as an assistant coach for a friendly against Mexico on August 11, 2011. On March 31, 2014, less than three months before the World Cup Vasquez was replaced by Tab Ramos, relegating him to unannounced "other responsibilities", which later turned out to be scouting and match observations.

On 14 April 2022, Vasquez was named head coach of USL League One side Central Valley Fuego. Vásquez parted ways with Fuego FC on July 3, 2023.

Vásquez joined Mark Briggs' staff at Sacramento Republic on 18 January 2024.

== Managerial statistics ==
Team	From	To	Record				
Team	From	To	G	W	D	L	Win %
Chivas USA	December 2, 2009	October 27, 2010	30	8	4	18	26.67

== Honors ==
Individual

- MLS All-Star: 1996
