= Derek Sanderson (soccer) =

American soccer player (1963–2024)

Personal information
- Date of birth: December 14, 1963 (age 62)
- Place of birth: San Jose, California, U.S.
- Date of death: May 11, 2024
- Place of death: Los Angeles, California, United States
- Height: 6 ft 2 in (1.88 m)
- Positions: Midfielder; forward

Youth career
- Mount Pleasant

Senior career*
Years	Team	Apps	(Gls)
1982	Portland Timbers	0	(0)
1982–1983	Golden Bay Earthquakes (indoor)	8	(0)
1983	Golden Bay Earthquakes		
1984	Jacksonville Tea Men		
1984–1986	Kalamazoo Kangaroos (indoor)		
1985–1986	San Jose Earthquakes		
1986–1987	Milwaukee Wave (indoor)	31	(18)
1987	Tampa Bay Rowdies (indoor)		
1988	Tampa Bay Rowdies	1	(0)
1988	Orlando Lions		
1989	San Francisco Bay Blackhawks		
1990–1991	Salt Lake Sting		(14)
1991	Fort Lauderdale Strikers	10	(7)
1992	Colorado Foxes	7	(0)
1992	Miami Freedom	5	(2)
1998	California Jaguars	1	(0)

International career
- U.S. U-20
- * Club domestic league appearances and goals

Derek Sanderson is an American retired soccer player who played professionally in eight leagues including the North American Soccer League, Major Indoor Soccer League and American Professional Soccer League. He played three games for the U.S. at the 1983 FIFA World Youth Championship.

== Professional ==
In 1982, Sanderson graduated from Mount Pleasant High School. That year, the Portland Timbers selected Sanderson in the fourth round of the North American Soccer League draft. However, Sanderson never cracked the first team. In the fall of 1982, he moved to the Golden Bay Earthquakes as they competed in the Major Indoor Soccer League. He remained with the Earthquakes for the 1983 North American Soccer League season, but spent much of the season with the United States men's national under-20 soccer team. In 1984, Sanderson moved to the Jacksonville Tea Men of the United Soccer League. That fall, he joined the Kalamazoo Kangaroos of the American Indoor Soccer Association. In 1985, he rejoined the Earthquakes, now playing in the Western Alliance Challenge Series. In the fall of 1985, Sanderson rejoined the Kangaroos, beginning the season in Kalamazoo before being traded to the Milwaukee Wave halfway through the season. In the summer of 1986, he again played for the Earthquakes. That fall, he rejoined the Wave for the 1986–1987 AISA season. In February 1987, the Wave sold his contract to the Tampa Bay Rowdies. He remained with the Rowdies as they played an independent outdoor season in 1987. In 1988, he began the American Soccer League season with the Rowdies, but was released on April 30, 1988, to free up a roster spot for Mark Kane. A week later, he signed with the Orlando Lions. In 1989, Sanderson returned to Northern California to join the San Francisco Bay Blackhawks. In 1990, he played for the Salt Lake Sting in the American Professional Soccer League which had been formed by the merger of the Western Soccer Alliance and the American Soccer League. In 1991, Sanderson began the season with the Sting but moved to the Fort Lauderdale Strikers after the Sting experienced financial difficulties. That season, he was a First Team All Star. On April 9, 1992, Sanderson signed with the Colorado Foxes. After failing to score in seven games, the Foxes sent him to the Miami Freedom. In 1998, he came out of retirement to play one game for the California Jaguars.

== International ==
In 1983, Sanderson played for the United States men's national under-20 soccer team at the 1983 FIFA World Youth Championship.
