= Alex Basso =

American soccer player (born 1960)

Personal information
- Date of birth: 1960 (age 65–66)
- Place of birth: Argentina
- Positions: Forward; defender

Senior career*
Years	Team	Apps	(Gls)
1978–1979	Independiente - ARG 1st Div		
1979–1980	Detroit Lightning (indoor)	6	(1)
1980	Golden Gate Gales	17	(5)
1981	New York United	20	(5)
1981–82	Panionios GSS	21	(4)
1988	San Jose Earthquakes	8	(3)
1989	San Francisco Bay Blackhawks	9	(3)
1990	Real Santa Barbara	19	(0)
1998	California Jaguars	3	(0)
- * Club domestic league appearances and goals

Alex Basso is an American retired professional soccer player. He played professionally in the American Soccer League, Super League Greece, Western Soccer Alliance and Major Indoor Soccer League.

Born in Argentina, Basso grew up in Fremont, California, where he played for the Fremont United and Newark Soccer Clubs. In 1978, he graduated from John F. Kennedy High School where he played on the boys' soccer team. In 1979, he signed with the Detroit Lightning of the Major Indoor Soccer League. In 1980, he moved outdoors with the Golden Gate Gales of the American Soccer League. In 1981, he played for New York United. In December 1981 he signed a five-year contract with Greek first division club Panionios, but he stayed only half season, till June 1982.

From 1984 to 1987, Basso played for the United States national futsal team. In 1988, he joined the San Jose Earthquakes of the Western Soccer Alliance. In 1989, he played for the San Francisco Bay Blackhawks. In 1990, he was the captain of Real Santa Barbara of the American Professional Soccer League.
