= Geoff Wall =

American soccer player and coach

Personal information
- Date of birth: September 14, 1964 (age 62)
- Place of birth: Tacoma, Washington, United States
- Height: 5 ft 10 in (1.78 m)
- Position: Midfielder

Senior career*
Years	Team	Apps	(Gls)
1983	Seattle Sounders	7	(0)
1983–1986	Tacoma Stars (indoor)	74	(8)
1984	Fort Lauderdale Sun		
1985–1988	F.C. Seattle	?	(10)
- * Club domestic league appearances and goals

Geoff Wall is a retired American soccer midfielder who played professionally in the North American Soccer League, Major Indoor Soccer League and Western Soccer Alliance.

Wall graduated from Ballard High School in 1982. He was a 1981 Parade Magazine High School All American soccer player. On December 15, 1981, the Portland Timbers selected Wall in the second round of the NASL draft. However, the Timbers folded in 1982. and Wall went on trial with AFC Bournemouth for four months. Wall also played for the U.S. U-19 national soccer team during this time. On April 29, 1983, he signed with the Seattle Sounders of the North American Soccer League. He played seven games with the Sounders which folded at the end of the season. In the fall of 1983, he joined the Tacoma Stars of the Major Indoor Soccer League and played three seasons with them. In the summer of 1984, Wall played for the Fort Lauderdale Sun in the United Soccer League. In 1985, he signed with F.C. Seattle of the Western Soccer Alliance and played with them through the 1988 season.

Wall continued to play amateur indoor and outdoor soccer in Seattle and coached youth soccer. In 1991, he joined the Seattle Fire Department.
