= Frank Barton (English footballer) =

English footballer (born 1947)

Personal information
- Date of birth: 22 October 1947 (age 79)
- Place of birth: Barton-upon-Humber, Lincolnshire, England
- Height: 5 ft 10 in (1.78 m)
- Position: Midfielder

Senior career*
Years	Team	Apps	(Gls)
1964–1968	Scunthorpe United	93	(26)
1968–1972	Carlisle United	165	(22)
1972–1973	Blackpool	18	(1)
1973–1976	Grimsby Town	123	(15)
1976–1978	AFC Bournemouth	66	(13)
1978	Hereford United	22	(3)
1978–1979	AFC Bournemouth	22	(2)
1979–1982	Seattle Sounders	78	(11)
1979–1980	Wichita Wings (indoor)	27	(9)
1981–1982	Seattle Sounders (indoor)	18	(9)
1983–1984	Tacoma Stars (indoor)	33	(2)
Total		587	(93)

Managerial career
- 1994–1996: Seattle Sounders (assistant)
- * Club domestic league appearances and goals

Frank Barton (born 22 October 1947) is an English retired footballer who played as a midfielder during the 1960s and 1970s.

Barton also gained international honours with England Youth team playing for his country in 5 international games in which he scored the first goal of a 3–0 victory over Spain at Swindon in 1966. He also obtained his English Football Association Full Coaching Certification in 1968 at the Lilleshall Training Centre.

He went on to play for Seattle Sounders of the North American Soccer League from 1979 until 1982. He also played indoor soccer for Seattle, the Wichita Wings and the Tacoma Stars.

In 1994, Barton became an assistant coach with the Seattle Sounders in the American Professional Soccer League.

Barton currently serves as a head coach with Emerald City Football Club in Seattle.

== Personal life ==
Barton is the grandfather of footballer Kelis Barton, who plays for Women's National League North club Rugby Borough.
