= Emerald City Football Club =

Emerald City Football Club (ECFC) is a Seattle-based select soccer club. ECFC is a premier year-round soccer club with professional coaching. It is one of Seattle's oldest select soccer clubs, having formed in 1979. ECFC is a non-profit, 501c3 organization largely run by volunteers. ECFC teams compete with other premier clubs in Washington State in the Puget Sound Premier League (PSPL). ECFC players come from all different neighborhoods in the Seattle and Puget Sound region, rather than from one specific geographical area. ECFC is a member of US Club Soccer.

== Players ==
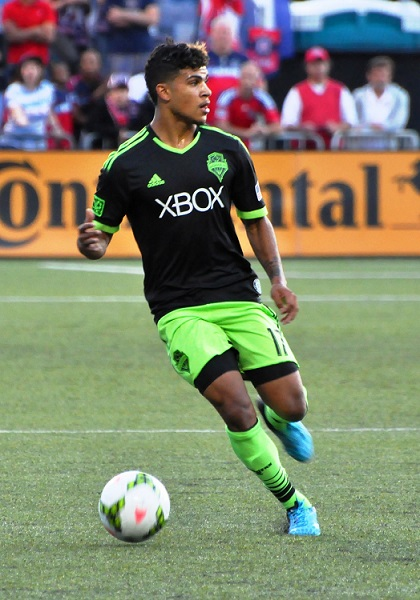
DeAndre Yedlin in 2014

Many former and current professional soccer players have spent some time playing for the Emerald City Football Club, including:

- Aaron Kovar (M) - 2009-2010, ECFC
- Henry Wingo (M) - Years?, ECFC
- Jamie Finch (M) - 2005-2007, ECFC
- Sean Morris (M) - 2007, ECFC
- DeAndre Yedlin (M) - 2004-2006, ECFC
- George John (M) - Years?, ECFC
- Ely Allen (M) - Years?, ECFC
- Temryss Lane (F) - 1990-2000, ECFC

== Coaches ==
Several notable professional players have served or serve currently as coaches with ECFC. This includes Frank Barton, who played professionally for almost 20 years, including with the Seattle Sounders. Mutanda Kwesele recently joined ECFC as a coach in 2019.

Effective December 1, 2016, the Director of Coaching is John Hamel, a Seattle-area former professional soccer player and long-time coach for ECFC. John is joined by David Smith who serves as Technical Director for the club.

The previous Director of Coaching at ECFC was Bobby Howe, an English footballer who has played for West Ham United and the Seattle Sounders, and also coached for the Seattle Sounders and Portland Timbers. Bobby is a 2016 recipient of the Dr. Thomas Fleck, US Youth Soccer Excellence in Coaching Education Award. Bobby is still an active coach for ECFC.

Brian Schmetzer, current coach for the Seattle Sounders, spent several years coaching for Emerald City FC in the late 1990s. Brian served as Technical Director and Director of Coaching for ECFC prior to joining the Sounders organization in 2002.
