= George Mihaljević =

Croatian-American footballer and coach

Personal information
- Full name: Đuro Mihaljević
- Date of birth: 28 February 1936 (age 90)
- Place of birth: Kingdom of Yugoslavia

Youth career
- 1948–1953: Radnički Beograd

Senior career*
Years	Team	Apps	(Gls)
1953–1954	Radnički Beograd		

Managerial career
- 1967: St. Louis Stars
- * Club domestic league appearances and goals

Đuro "George" Mihaljević (born 28 February 1936) is a Croatian-American former football player and coach.

== Career ==
Mihaljević began his career with the youth team of Radnički Beograd in 1948. Between the ages of 18 and 22 he played professionally in Austria, Germany and Switzerland, before moving to the United States, where he joined the Army. After retiring as a player, he became the first ever coach of the St. Louis Stars during the 1967 season.

== Personal life ==
Mihaljević has five children. His eldest son Joe Mihaljević was also a professional footballer; together they run the Mihaljevic Soccer School, now in Folsom, California, a soccer school which George founded in St. Louis, Missouri.
