= Dzung Tran =

Vietnamese footballer

Personal information
- Date of birth: 1963 (age 62–63)
- Place of birth: Huế, South Vietnam
- Height: 5 ft 7 in (1.70 m)
- Positions: Forward; midfielder

College career
Years	Team	Apps	(Gls)
1983–1984	Foothill Owls		

Senior career*
Years	Team	Apps	(Gls)
1985–1986	San Jose Earthquakes	?	(2)
1985	San Diego Sockers (indoor)	0	(0)
1986–1987	Los Angeles Heat	?	(0)
1987	Milwaukee Wave (indoor)	39	(10)
1988	San Jose Earthquakes	?	(3)
1990–1991	Milwaukee Wave (indoor)	23	(10)
1990–1991	Salt Lake Sting		
1991	San Francisco Bay Blackhawks	6	(0)
1996	San Jose Oaks		
- * Club domestic league appearances and goals

Dzung Tran is a Vietnamese retired footballer who spent time in the Major Indoor Soccer League, Western Soccer Alliance and National Professional Soccer League.

In 1978, Tran, his father and brother, escaped Vietnam after the communist capture of South Vietnam. He attended Livermore High School before transferring to San Jose High School where he graduated in 1983. In 1984, he practiced with the Golden Bay Earthquakes, including playing two minutes of a preseason game. That fall, he began playing soccer at Foothill College, but Golden Gate Conference officials determined that his game with the Earthquakes counted as a professional event. Therefore, he was stripped of his collegiate eligibility during the season. In June 1985, the San Diego Sockers selected Tran in the first round of the Major Indoor Soccer League draft. The Sockers released him in December 1985. In 1985, he played for the San Jose Earthquakes which won the Western Alliance Challenge Series. He continued to play for the Earthquakes in 1986 before moving to the Los Angeles Heat for the 1987 Western Soccer Alliance season. In the fall of 1986, Tran signed with the Milwaukee Wave of the American Indoor Soccer Association. In 1988, he returned to the Earthquakes. In 1990, he played for the Salt Lake Sting in the American Professional Soccer League. He then returned to the Milwaukee Wave for the 1990–1991 indoor season. In 1991, he began the season with the Sting which folded halfway through the season. He then signed with the San Francisco Bay Blackhawks. He later played for the San Jose Oaks.
