= Arturo Velazco =

American soccer player (born 1964)

Personal information
- Date of birth: December 18, 1964 (age 61)
- Place of birth: San Diego, California, United States
- Height: 5 ft 10 in (1.78 m)
- Position: Defender

Senior career*
Years	Team	Apps	(Gls)
1986–1990	San Diego Nomads		
1989–1990	San Diego Sockers	13	(0)
1990–1992	Milwaukee Wave (indoor)	73	(8)
1991	Colorado Foxes	17	(1)
1992	Miami Freedom	15	(1)
1992–1994	Wichita Wings (indoor)	72	(9)
1993–1994	Los Angeles Salsa		
1995	Mexico Toros (indoor)	25	(2)

International career
1988	United States	2	(0)
- * Club domestic league appearances and goals

Arturo Velazco (born December 18, 1964) is an American former soccer defender. He played four seasons in the Western Soccer Alliance, five in the American Professional Soccer League, at least three in the National Professional Soccer League and one in the Continental Indoor Soccer League. He also earned two caps with the United States men's national soccer team in 1988.

== Club career ==
=== Outdoor soccer ===
Velazco graduated from La Jolla High School. In 1984, he joined the San Diego Sockers of the North American Soccer League, but never entered a first-team game. In 1986, he signed with the San Diego Nomads of the Western Soccer Alliance. He played with the Nomads through the 1990 season. During his four seasons with the Nomads, Velazco won the 1987 and 1989 championships. In 1988, Velazco was a first team All Star. In 1990, the WSA merged with the American Soccer League to form the American Professional Soccer League. The Nomads failed to make the playoffs, then withdrew from the league. Velazco then moved to the Colorado Foxes for the 1991 season. He moved again in 1992, this time to the Miami Freedom. On April 29, 1993, he signed with the expansion Los Angeles Salsa The Salsa lasted only two seasons before folding in 1994.

=== Indoor soccer ===
On October 4, 1989, Velazco began his indoor career with the San Diego Sockers of the Major Indoor Soccer League. In October 1990, he moved to the Milwaukee Wave of the National Professional Soccer League. He was a first team All Star that season. He also played at least two seasons, 1992–1994 with the Wichita Wings of the NPSL. In 1995, he played with the Mexico Toros of the Continental Indoor Soccer League.

== International career ==
Velazco earned two caps with the United States men's national soccer team, both in June 1988. The first came in a 1–1 tie with Chile on June 1. The second was a 3–1 loss to Chile two days later.
