= John Hamel =

American soccer player

Personal information
- Date of birth: January 31, 1967 (age 59)
- Place of birth: Seattle, Washington, U.S.
- Height: 5 ft 7 in (1.70 m)
- Position: Midfielder

Youth career
- 1985–1988: Washington Huskies

Senior career*
Years	Team	Apps	(Gls)
1987–1990	Seattle Storm		
1989–1990	Tacoma Stars (indoor)	33	(2)
1996	Seattle SeaDogs (indoor)	10	(1)
- * Club domestic league appearances and goals

John Hamel (born January 31, 1967) is an American retired soccer midfielder who played three seasons in the Western Soccer Alliance, one in the American Professional Soccer League, one in the Continental Indoor Soccer League and at least one in the Major Indoor Soccer League.

== Playing ==
Hamel grew up in Seattle where he attended Blanchet High School. He then attended the University of Washington where he played on the men's soccer team from 1985 to 1988. In 1987, he moved to the F.C. Seattle of the Western Soccer Alliance. That year he was second team All-WSA. He played for Seattle through the 1990 season. That year, the team's last in existence, was spent in the American Professional Soccer League. On July 9, 1989, the Tacoma Stars of the Major Indoor Soccer League selected Hamel in the fourth round of the MISL draft. In 1996, Hamel signed with the Seattle SeaDogs of the Continental Indoor Soccer League. He played only that one season with the SeaDogs.

== Coaching ==
Hamel has spent many years coaching in the Seattle area. He has served primarily as a coach at Emerald City Football Club for the past 10+ years. John has coached several of his older boys’ teams to the finals of their respective state championships. John also has served recreational players for 13 years in CYO and 7 years in SYSA member clubs. He has also coached 3 years in the Liberty High School Boys and Girls programs and 4 years in the Lakeside High School Boys program. John also coaches periodically for Peter Fewing's soccer camps. John holds his US Soccer ‘B’ License.

Effective December 1, 2016, John Hamel has been named the Director of Coaching for Emerald City Football Club. He succeeds Bobby Howe in this capacity.
