= John Stollmeyer =

American soccer player and coach

Personal information
- Full name: John Michael Stollmeyer
- Date of birth: October 25, 1962 (age 64)
- Place of birth: Pittsburgh, Pennsylvania, United States
- Height: 5 ft 9 in (1.75 m)
- Positions: Midfielder; defender

College career
Years	Team	Apps	(Gls)
1982–1985	Indiana University		

Senior career*
Years	Team	Apps	(Gls)
1986–1988	Cleveland Force (indoor)	101	(29)
1989–1990	Arizona Condors		
1990	Washington Stars		

International career
1986–1990	United States	31	(0)

Managerial career
- Notre Dame (assistant)
- * Club domestic league appearances and goals

John Michael Stollmeyer (born October 25, 1962, in Pittsburgh) is an American former soccer player. He played two seasons in Major Indoor Soccer League and one each in both the American Soccer League and the American Professional Soccer League. He also earned thirty-one caps with the U.S. national team from 1986 to 1990 and was a member of the U.S. team at the 1990 FIFA World Cup.

== High school and college ==
Stollmeyer, a native of Pennsylvania, attended Thomas Jefferson High School in Annandale, Virginia. In 1981, he was the National Amateur Soccer Athlete of the Year. In December 1980, he was selected by the Tampa Bay Rowdies in the first round of the North American Soccer League draft. Instead of signing with the Rowdies he chose to attend Indiana University Bloomington from 1982 to 1986. While at Indiana, he was a member of the school's NCAA Men's Soccer Championship teams of 1982 and 1983, as well as the 1984 second-place team. He was selected as a second-team All-American in 1982 and 1985 and a third-team All-American in 1984. In 1982, he was the NCAA Defender of the Year. In 1999, he was elected to the Indiana University Hall of Fame.

== U.S. Olympic Sports Festival ==
In the early 1980s, the U.S. Olympic organization initiated the Olympic Sports Festival as a means of identifying and training prospective Olympians. In soccer, the organization divided prominent amateur players into four teams, north, south, east and west. Stollmeyer was a member of the East Regional Team for the 1982, 1983 and 1985 Olympic Sports Festivals.

== Cleveland Force ==
In 1985, Stollmeyer was drafted by the Cleveland Force of the Major Indoor Soccer League (MISL). He was the MISL rookie of the year in 1986–1987. Stollmeyer's second season with the team, 1987–1988, was his last as the team folded at the end of the season.

== WSL/APSL ==
When the Cleveland Force closed in 1988, he moved to the Arizona Condors of the outdoor Western Soccer League. Stollmeyer played with the Condors for one season in 1990. Once again, Stollmeyer was left without a team when the Condors folded at the end of the 1990 season. He was briefly associated with the Washington Stars, but that team also folded in 1990.

== National teams ==
While in high school, he played on the U.S. team at the 1981 FIFA World Youth Championship in Australia. Stollmayer also was on the U.S. team at the 1983 Pan American Games. During his time with the Force, Stollmeyer was a member of the 1987 Pan American Games U.S. team. In Indianapolis, the U.S. defeated Trinidad and Tobago 3–0, tied El Salvador 0–0, but lost to Argentina 0–2. The 1–1–1 record gave the U.S. 2nd place in its pool, but not enough to advance out of group play. That year he was also a member of the U.S. 1987 Summer Universiade soccer team in Zagreb, Croatia.

The following year Stollmeyer played for the U.S. team at the 1988 Summer Olympics in Seoul, South Korea. That team tied Argentina and South Korea, then lost to the Soviet Union. Once again, Stollmeyer's team failed to exit group play.

Despite the professional disappointments, Stollmeyer still made the U.S. team for the 1990 FIFA World Cup in Italy. However, in this last major international tournament of his career, Stollmeyer's team again failed to exit group play, losing to Italy, Czechoslovakia and Austria.

== Coaching ==
After he retired from playing professionally, Stollmeyer spent time as an assistant coach with Notre Dame.

== Post-soccer career ==
Stollmeyer is a Vice President of investments for Raymond James in Indianapolis.
