= Dick Berg (sports promoter) =

American sports promoter (1944–2018)

- Born: 1944; Puyallup, Washington
- Died: March 22, 2018
- Occupation(s): sports promoter, athlete
- Known for: Promotions for the NFL and the Olympics. Quarterback at Stanford University. Coined the term "49er Faithful" for the 49er's fans.

Dick Berg (1944 - March 22, 2018) was a sports promoter and athlete. He promoted the NFL and the Olympics and was also quarterback at Stanford University.

== Life and career ==
Berg was born and raised in Puyallup, Washington.

He was a quarterback at Stanford University where he helped win their first victory over Notre Dame University in 1963.

Berg started promoting sports while attending law school at the University of Washington and working for the Seattle Chamber of Commerce. He helped the city of Seattle with its NBA expansion and getting SuperSonics to move there. He became the team’s director of marketing.

He was the first general manager for the San Jose Earthquakes, and is said to have come up with the name Earthquakes.

He also worked for and promoted Dallas Tornado of the NASL and the Los Angeles Express of the United States Football League.

General Manager of the San Francisco FOG (MISL) 1980-81.

He coined the term "49er Faithful" for the 49er's fans.

== Personal life ==
Berg was married and divorced three times. One of his sons drowned at age of 2 in their California home pool. He had another son named Brady and daughter named Alexa.

== Bibliography ==
- 197?, Eavesdropping America, Dick Berg, Glenn Dickey
