= Joe Mihaljevic =

American soccer player and coach

Joe Mihaljević
Personal information
- Full name: Joseph Maurice Mihaljević
- Date of birth: September 19, 1960 (age 66)
- Place of birth: St. Louis, Missouri, United States
- Height: 6 ft 1 in (1.85 m)
- Position: Forward

Youth career
- Hartwick College

Senior career*
| Years | Team | Apps | (Gls) |
| 1982–1987 | Pittsburgh Spirit (indoor) | 9 | (0) |
| 1988 | Fort Wayne Flames (indoor) | 12 | (2) |
| 1986–1987 | San Jose Earthquakes | | |
| 1988 | Miami Sharks | | |
| 1990–1992 | San Jose Oaks | | |

Managerial career
- 2007–: Folsom High School
- Rio Americano High School
- 2008–: Mihaljevic Soccer Club – Top Gun
- * Club domestic league appearances and goals

Joe Mihaljević (born September 19, 1960, in St. Louis, Missouri) is a retired soccer forward. He runs a year-round soccer school in Folsom, California

== Youth ==
His father, Đuro Đuro "George" Mihaljević, a native of Croatia, played professionally in Europe before immigrating to the U.S. He eventually settled in St. Louis, Missouri where he became the first head coach of the North American Soccer League's St. Louis Stars. In 1966, George established the first soccer school in the United States in St. Louis, Missouri "Mihaljevic Soccer School", and developed many talented players. At age 8, Mihaljević began attending his father's school and played for its competitive team, Missouri Mules. The team won 2 international youth tournaments in the Netherlands & Canada.

== College ==
After graduating from high school in 1978, Mihaljević was sent to live with relatives in the former Yugoslavia to train & play soccer. He reluctantly turned down a 4-year contract with 1st Division Teams, Red Star Belgrade and OFK Beograd due to the country's impending civil war. Upon returning to the United States, he attended Meramec Community College and was a first team "All AMERICAN" after he graduated junior college Mihaljević was offered a full NCAA, Division I scholarship to Hartwick College in Oneonta, New York in 1978. Coached by one of the top coaches in the United States Jim Lennox a United States Staff Coach where Joe said he received the best training of his life along with his father George. In addition to playing collegiate soccer, Mihaljević played on amateur clubs. In 1981, he was on the Anheuser-Busch Soccer Club when it won the U.S. Amateur Cup. Mihaljević scored the winning goal 2–1 against Philadelphia Bayern.

== Professional career ==
In 1982, the Pittsburgh Spirit of the Major Indoor Soccer League (MISL) drafted Mihaljević as its 2nd-round draft pick and played on a line with Stan Terlecki of Poland the Co-MVP of the League with Steve Zungul. In 1988, Mihaljević joined the Fort Wayne Flames of the American Indoor Soccer Association (AISA) for the Challenge Cup Playoffs. In 1986, the San Jose Earthquakes of the Western Soccer Alliance (WSA) signed Mihaljević. The next year, he was the Alliance's "Leading Goal Scorer" and became the "United States' Leading Goal Scorer" in 1987 with seven goals and two assists. He moved east to the Miami Sharks for the 1988 American Soccer League (ASL) season, under the coaching of 1970's World Cup Captain, Carlos Alberto Torres, of Brazil where he established himself as a force on the team by scoring 5 goals in the last 25 minutes of his 2nd game, defeating the Washington Diplomats, 5–1, a record for "Most Goals Scored in a Game". He also had Dirceu Guimares as a midfielder on the Miami Sharks. Dirceu Guimares was voted 3rd "Most Valuable Player in the World at the 1978 World Cup for Brazil behind Mario Kempes of Argentina and Rob Rensenbrink of Holland.

In 1990, he joined the San Jose Oaks Soccer Club and remained with the team through the 1992 season when the team took the U.S. Open Cup. Mihaljević was voted 1992 U.S. Open Cup "Most Valuable Player" with a goal and 2 assists in the final game (3–1).

== Coaching ==
After retiring from playing professionally Mihaljević re-opened his father's soccer school in Folsom, California in September 2003, also named "Mihaljevic Soccer School".

== Personal ==
Mihaljević has 4 children with Lynette Trinidad-Mihaljević (married 1994. divorced 2018): Joey, Dominique, John Paul & Milan.
