= 1978 in American soccer =

Soccer in the United States
- Season: 1978

The 1978 season was the 66th season of competitive soccer in the United States.

== National teams ==
=== Men ===
==== Senior ====
Wins	Losses	Draws
0	2	1

September 3 Friendly	Iceland	0–0	United States	Reykjavík, Iceland

September 6 Friendly	Switzerland	2–0	United States	Zürich, Switzerland

September 20 Friendly	Portugal	1–0	United States	Lisbon, Portugal

== League standings ==
=== North American Soccer League (Div. 1) ===
==== National Conference ====
Eastern Division

Pos.	Club	GP	W	L	GF	GA	GD	Pts.	Qualification
1	Cosmos	30	24	6	88	39	+49	212	1978 NASL Playoffs
2	Washington Diplomats	30	16	14	55	47	+8	145	1978 NASL Playoffs
