= 1986 National Challenge Cup =

- Dewar Challenge Cup

Tournament details
- Country: United States

Final positions
- Champions: Kutis SC (2nd title)
- Runners-up: San Pedro Yugoslavs
- 1987 CONCACAF Champions' Cup: Kutis SC

The 1986 National Challenge Cup marked the 72nd edition of the USSF's annual open soccer championship. Notably, teams from the American Soccer League chose not to participate that year, leaving the field open for other contenders. In a tightly contested final, Kutis SC of St. Louis emerged victorious, edging out the San Pedro Yugoslavs with a 1–0 win to claim the championship title.
