= George Pastor =

American soccer player and coach

Personal information
- Full name: Jorge Pastor
- Date of birth: 23 November 1963 (age 62)
- Place of birth: Lima, Peru
- Position: Forward

Senior career*
| Years | Team | Apps | (Gls) |
| 1986–1988 | San Jose Earthquakes | | |
| 1986–1991 | Milwaukee Wave (indoor) | 156 | (174) |
| 1989 | San Francisco Bay Blackhawks | | |
| 1990–1991 | Salt Lake Sting | | (20) |
| 1991–1992 | St. Louis Storm (indoor) | 39 | (21) |
| 1992 | San Jose Oaks | | |

International career
| 1988–1989 | United States | 7 | (0) |
- * Club domestic league appearances and goals

George Pastor (born November 23, 1963) is a former U.S. soccer forward who was a prolific indoor soccer goal scorer. He also earned seven caps with the U.S. national team in 1988 and 1989.

== Indoor career ==
Pastor's reputation rests largely on his highly successful indoor soccer career. In 1986, he signed with the Milwaukee Wave of the American Indoor Soccer Association. Over his five seasons in Milwaukee, he scored a team record 174 goals. In 1991, he moved to the St. Louis Storm of Major Soccer League (MSL) for the 1991–1992 season. The Storm folded at the end of the season.

== Outdoor career ==
In 1986, Pastor joined the San Jose Earthquakes of the Western Soccer Alliance (WSA). He spent the next two seasons with the Earthquakes as they lost the WSA championship game in both 1987 and 1988. The team folded at the end of the 1988 season and Pastor signed with the San Francisco Bay Blackhawks for the 1989 season. After only one year with the Blackhawks, he moved to the Salt Lake Sting of the American Professional Soccer League in 1990. The Sting folded after the 1991 season.

Without a professional club in 1992, Pastor moved to the semi-pro San Jose Oaks. That year, the Oaks won the U.S. Open Cup.

== National team ==
Pastor earned seven caps with the U.S. national team in 1988 and 1989. His first game with the national team came in a 1–1 tie with Chile on June 1, 1988. He played one World Cup qualification game, another 1–1 tie, this time with Trinidad and Tobago on May 13, 1989. Pastor's last game with the national team was as a substitute for Paul Caligiuri on June 24, 1989, a 1–0 loss to Colombia.

== Coaching ==
Since retiring from playing professionally, Pastor has coached several youth teams. He is currently a staff coach with the Mavericks soccer club.
