= Barney Boyce =

American soccer player and coach (born 1960)

Personal information
- Date of birth: November 2, 1960 (age 65)
- Place of birth: St. Louis, Missouri, U.S.
- Height: 5 ft 10 in (1.78 m)
- Positions: Defender; midfielder

Senior career*
Years	Team	Apps	(Gls)
1980	Washington Diplomats	5	(0)
1981	Montreal Manic	1	(0)
1981–1982	Kansas City Comets (indoor)	3	(0)
1982	San Jose Earthquakes	11	(0)
1982–1983	Golden Bay Earthquakes (indoor)	38	(1)
1983–1984	Golden Bay Earthquakes	24	(0)
1985–1988	San Jose Earthquakes		
1990	Salt Lake Sting		
1992	San Jose Oaks		

Managerial career
- 1987–1988: San Jose Earthquakes
- * Club domestic league appearances and goals

Barney Boyce (born November 2, 1960) is an American retired soccer player who played professionally in the North American Soccer League, Major Indoor Soccer League and Western Soccer Alliance. He coached the San Jose Earthquakes in the Western Soccer Alliance.

== Player ==
On September 13, 1979, the Washington Diplomats of the North American Soccer League signed Boyce who was eighteen at the time. He had been playing in Yugoslavia at the time. In the fall of 1980, the Montreal Manic purchased Boyce's contract from the Dips. He played limited time with the Manic in 1981 before moving to the Kansas City Comets for the 1981-1982 Major Indoor Soccer League season.

In 1982, Boyce moved to the San Jose Earthquakes. In the fall of 1982, the team was renamed the Golden Bay Earthquakes and spent the indoor season playing in the MISL. The Earthquakes returned to the NASL for the 1983 outdoor season. Boyce remained with the Earthquakes through the 1984 NASL season, the 1985 independent exhibition season, and continued with the Earthquakes as they entered the Western Soccer Alliance in 1986. He continued to play for the Earthquakes through 1988. In 1990, he played for the Salt Lake Sting in the American Professional Soccer League. In 1992, Boyce played for the San Jose Oaks.

== Coach ==
In 1987, Boyce became the head coach of the Earthquakes and took the team to the WSA championship game. He began the 1988 season as head coach, but was fired in June and replaced by Tomás Boy after a poor start.
