= Salt Lake Sting =

- Full name: Salt Lake Sting
- Nickname: Sting
- Founded: 1990
- Ground: Derks Field
- Capacity: 10,000
- League: American Professional Soccer League

The Salt Lake Sting was a professional soccer team based in Salt Lake City, Utah. They played in the American Professional Soccer League. The club was originally owned by Jack Donovan, who was also the head of the ownership group for Salt Lake City's minor league baseball team of the era, the Salt Lake Trappers. The Sting lasted parts of two seasons, but financial concerns caused league officials to shut the franchise down in midseason on July 5, 1991.

== Stadium ==
The Sting played their short career at Derks Field, a minor-league baseball stadium. The field was laid out in the outfield, and a portion of the field was dirt because it was the infield portion of the baseball diamond.

== Initial season ==
Nearly 10,000 fans attended the first game in April, 1990. The club averaged 5,400 attendees over the 13 games of the first season. This thrilled the ownership as they were hoping to average 2,500. A crowd of 9,439 watched the final game against the San Diego Nomads. The Sting ended the season with a 12-8 record and second place in the Western Soccer League conference. They were knocked out of the playoffs by the Colorado Foxes 2-1 and 4-1. George Pastor was the second leading scorer and Derek Sanderson was the fifth leading scorer in the APSL.

== Second season ==
Director Fred Gray had high hopes for the 1991 season with new coach Valery Volostnykn. The new squad returned leading scorer George Pastor and added local talent Steve Sengelmann of Provo and goalkeeper Pat Vietti of Salt Lake. The club ended the season with a 3-17 record and folded before the final game could be played.

== Ownership ==
- (United States) Jack Donovan

== Staff ==
- (United States) Fred Gray - General Manager

Fred Gray Public Relations Director/Director of Soccer Operations

== Coaching ==
The team was coached by Laurie Calloway from England during their rookie season in 1990. The coach for the Salt Lake Sting in 1991 was Valery Volostnykh from Russia who previously coached at Real Santa Barbara.

- (England) Laurie Calloway (1990)
- (Soviet Union) Valery Volostnykh (1991)

== Players ==
- Category:Salt Lake Sting players

== Year-by-year ==
Year	Division	League	Reg. season	Playoffs	Open Cup
1990	N/A	APSL	2nd, WSL North	WSL 1st Round	Did not enter
1991	N/A	APSL	4th, Western	Did not qualify	Did not enter
