= Robbie Zipp =

American soccer player and referee

Personal information
- Full name: Robert Zipp
- Date of birth: September 7, 1963 (age 63)
- Place of birth: United States
- Height: 5 ft 11 in (1.80 m)
- Positions: Midfielder; defender

Senior career*
Years	Team	Apps	(Gls)
1980–82	Seattle Sounders (indoor)	2	(0)
1981	Washington Diplomats	0	(0)
1982	Seattle Sounders	0	(0)
1984–1985	F.C. Seattle	?	(0)
1986–1988	San Jose Earthquakes		
- * Club domestic league appearances and goals

Robert Zipp is a retired U.S. soccer player who currently serves as a youth soccer referee.

Zipp attended O'Dea High School in Seattle, Washington where he was a four-year varsity letterman on the boys' soccer team. He was also a two-year letterman on the football team. Additionally, Parade Magazine selected Zipp as a high school All-American soccer player in 1980 and 1981. After graduating from high school, he was drafted in the first round of the North American Soccer League (NASL) draft. Records don't show which team drafted him. However, in 1981, Zipp was a member of Washington Diplomats. Zipp then played the 1981-1982 NASL indoor season with the Seattle Sounders; however, he never appeared in an outdoor game with the Sounders. The Sounders folded at the end of the 1983 NASL season and in 1984, Zipp joined F.C. Seattle for the F.C. Seattle Challenge '84. This four team round-robin series pitted F.C. Seattle, an independent local Seattle “super club” against the New York Cosmos, Vancouver Whitecaps and Minnesota Strikers. F.C. Seattle was largely stocked with ex-NASL players put out of work by the disintegration of the NASL.

In 1985, F.C. Seattle joined with several other independent west coast clubs to form the Western Soccer Alliance (WSA). Zipp continued with the team this season, becoming the team captain after former captain Jeff Durgan was released following the team's game with the Canadian national soccer team. In 1986, Zipp moved to the San Jose Earthquakes. He remained with the Earthquakes through the 1988 WSA season, after which the Earthquakes folded.

Since retiring from playing professionally, Zipp has remained active as a youth soccer referee. He is currently an AYSA referee coordinator. In 2004, O’Dea High School inducted Zipp into the school's Athletic Wall of Honor.
