= 1985 Western Alliance Challenge Series =

Western Alliance Challenge Series
- Season: 1985
- Champions: San Jose Earthquakes (1st title)

The inaugural edition of the Western Alliance Challenge Series, a soccer competition between teams in the United States and Canada, took place in 1985. The four participating teams were F.C. Seattle, the Victoria Riptide, F.C. Portland, and the San Jose Earthquakes; these teams later joined the Western Soccer Alliance, which later merged with the American Soccer League to form the American Professional Soccer League, the forerunner of the USL First Division.

== History ==
In 1984, the independent F.C. Seattle hosted the F.C. Seattle Challenge which included several North American Soccer League teams. The success of the tournament led league officials to offer an NASL franchise to the F.C. Seattle ownership. The team declined the offer and instead decided to build on the success of the tournament by creating an ad hoc league with several other independent soccer teams in the Pacific Northwest. Three teams joined F.C. Seattle, the Victoria Riptide, F.C. Portland and the San Jose Earthquakes which had played in the NASL before its demise in the spring of 1985. These four teams played each other and the non-league Edmonton Brick Men and Canada national soccer team. The games against the Brick Men and Canada national team were included in the final league standings. The series proved financially successful and led to the formal establishment of the Western Soccer Alliance.

== League standings ==
Pos	Team	Pld	W	T	L	GF	GA	GD	Pts
1	San Jose Earthquakes (C)	7	4	1	2	10	9	+1	13
2	F.C. Seattle	7	3	1	3	16	11	+5	10
3	Victoria Riptide	7	3	1	3	13	13	0	10
4	F.C. Portland	7	1	2	4	8	16	−8	5

(C) Champions
