= San Jose Oaks =

- Full name: San Jose Oaks Soccer Club
- Founded: 1974
- Chairman: Andy Hewitt
- League: Peninsula Soccer League

The San Jose Oaks are a semi-professional soccer club from San Jose, California with affiliations to the California Soccer Association and the USSF.

== History ==
The Oaks were founded in 1974 as an amateur side. The team has participated in the California International Soccer League and the Peninsula Soccer League. Among their most notable achievements was winning the 1992 U.S. Open Cup and subsequent participation in the CONCACAF Cup Winners' Cup". The Oaks have also participated at under 23, over 30 and over 35 levels.

== Honors ==
Peninsula Soccer League

- Champions 1979–80, 1980–81
- Under 23 Champions 1988–89

California Major League

- Champions 1981–82, 1990–91, 1991–92

California State Cup

- Champions 1988–89

U.S. Open Cup

- Champions 1992
- State Champions 1990–91
- Over 30 Champions 1992
- Women's 1992
- Participants in CONCACAF Cup Winners Cup: 1993
