= San Jose Earthquakes (1974–1988) =

Defunct American soccer club

- Full name: San Jose Earthquakes
- Founded: December 11, 1973
- Dissolved: 1988; 38 years ago
- Stadium: Outdoor: Spartan Stadium (18,155); Indoor: Cow Palace (11,089); Oakland Coliseum Arena (13,601)
- League: NASL (1974–1984); MISL (1982–1983); WSA (1985–1988)
Home colors	Away colors

The San Jose Earthquakes were a professional soccer club that played from 1974 to 1988. The team began as an expansion franchise in the North American Soccer League (NASL), and was originally set to play in San Francisco; but slow season ticket sales led to a late switch to San Jose's Spartan Stadium. The switch to sports-starved San Jose was an immediate hit, and the Earthquakes led the league with attendance over 15,000 per game in 1974, double the league average. The team's success led Spartan Stadium to be chosen as site of the first NASL Soccer Bowl in 1975. From 1983 to 1984, the team was known as the Golden Bay Earthquakes. During this time, it also played in the original Major Indoor Soccer League and in the NASL's indoor circuit, winning the first ever NASL indoor tournament in 1975. Their indoor games were first played at the Cow Palace and later at the Oakland Coliseum Arena.

Following the collapse of the NASL in 1984, the team's name reverted to San Jose Earthquakes prior to joining the Western Soccer Alliance in 1985, where it played until the league's folding after the 1988 season. The club hosted a "10th Anniversary Reunion Game" on May 12, 1984, to celebrate the founding of the club. The game pitted alumni who primarily were members of the original 1974 team against the 1984 Golden Bay squad.

The name Earthquakes was created by general manager Dick Berg. While it was criticized due to San Jose's proximity to the San Andreas Fault, the name stayed on. In 1999, the Earthquakes name returned when San Jose's Major League Soccer franchise renamed themselves from the Clash to Earthquakes. A rebranding in 2014 added "1974" to the MLS team's crest, an explicit reference to the original NASL team.

== Year-by-year ==
Outdoor:

Season	League	W	L	T	GF	GA	Finish	Playoffs	Avg. Attend.
1974	NASL	9	8	3	43	38	2nd West	Lost Quarterfinal	16,584
1975	NASL	8	14		37	48	5th West	did not qualify	17,927
1976	NASL	14	10		47	30	1st South	Lost Conference Finals	19,826
1977	NASL	14	12		37	44	2nd South	Lost in 1st round	17,739
1978	NASL	8	22		36	81	4th American West	did not qualify	14,281
1979	NASL	8	22		41	74	4th American West	did not qualify	15,092
1980	NASL	9	23		45	68	4th American West	did not qualify	13,169
1981	NASL	11	21		44	78	4th West	did not qualify	12,400
1982	NASL	13	19		47	62	5th West	did not qualify	11,012
1983	NASL	20	10		71	54	2nd West	Lost Semifinal	11,933
1984	NASL	8	16		61	62	5th West	did not qualify	10,676
1985	WACS	4	2	1	10	9	1st	N/A	
1986	WSA	3	4	7	13	23	6th	N/A	
1987	WSA	6	7		21	13	3rd	Runners-up	
1988	WSA	7	5		20	19	3rd	Runners-up	

Note: The team played as the Golden Bay Earthquakes in the 1983 and 1984 seasons.

=== NASL and MISL Indoor Soccer ===
In the winter of 1975, the NASL ran a two-tiered, 16-team indoor tournament with four regional winners meeting in a "final-four" style championship. Not only did San Jose host their region at the Cow Palace, but the final four as well. The Quakes swept through the tournament unscathed, defeating the Tampa Bay Rowdies 8–5 in the final to the delight of their fans. San Jose teammates Paul Child and Gabbo Gavric were named co-MVPs. In 1976, the Earthquakes again advanced to the final four before losing to the Rochester Lancers at the Bayfront Center in Florida. They would rebound the following day to win the 3rd Place match 5–2 over Dallas. The NASL would not begin playing full indoor seasons until 1979–80, but San Jose did not fare nearly as well in that format. The NASL canceled its 1982–83 indoor season. As a result, the Earthquakes along with Chicago and San Diego played in the MISL that winter.

Season	League	W	L	GF	GA	Place	Playoffs
1975	NASL	4	0	37	17	1st West	NASL Champions
1976	NASL	3	1	35	18	1st West	3rd place
1980–81	NASL	10	8	118	115	3rd West	did not qualify
1981–82	NASL	5	13	83	141	3rd National West	did not qualify
1982–83	MISL	17	31	240	290	5th West	did not qualify
1983–84	NASL	19	13	206	190	4th	Lost Semifinal

Note: The team played the 1982/83 and 1983/84 seasons as the Golden Bay Earthquakes.

== Head coaches ==
- (Socialist Federal Republic of Yugoslavia) Momčilo Gavrić (1974)
- (Socialist Federal Republic of Yugoslavia) Ivan Toplak (1974–1975)
- (Socialist Federal Republic of Yugoslavia) Momčilo Gavrić (1975–1978)
- (United States) Terry Fisher (1978–1979)
- (Germany) Peter Stubbe (1979)
- (England) Bill Foulkes (1980)
- (Scotland) Jimmy Gabriel (1981)
- (England) Peter Short (1982)
- (England) Joe Mallett (1982)
- (Socialist Federal Republic of Yugoslavia) Dragan Popović (1983–1984)
- (England) Laurie Calloway (1985)
- (England) Steve Litt (1986)
- (United States) Barney Boyce (1987–1988)
- (Mexico) Tomás Boy (1988)
- (United States) Tony Zanotto (1988)

== Honors ==
Championships
- 1975 NASL indoor
- 1985 WACS
- 1987 WSA (runner-up)
- 1988 WSA (runner-up)

NASL Division titles

- 1974 Southern Division, Pacific Conference
- 1975 Region 4 (indoor)
- 1976 West Regional (indoor)

NASL Most Valuable Player

- 1975 Paul Child & Gabbo Garvic (indoor)
- 1983–84 Steve Zungul (indoor)
- 1984 Steve Zungul

North American Player of the Year

- 1984 Branko Šegota

Coach of the Year

- 1983 Don Popovic

Leading Scorer

- 1974 Paul Child 36 points
- 1975 Paul Child (indoor) 31 points
- 1982–83 Steve Zungul (MISL) 122 points
- 1983–84 Steve Zungul (indoor) 119 points
- 1984 Steve Zungul 50 points
- 1987 Joe Mihaljevic 16 points

Leading Goal Scorer

- 1974 Paul Child 15 goals
- 1975 Paul Child (indoor) 14 goals
- 1976 Juli Veee (indoor) 8 goals
- 1982–83 Steve Zungul (MISL) 75 goals
- 1983–84 Steve Zungul (indoor) 63 goals
- 1984 Steve Zungul 20 goals
- 1987 Joe Mihaljevic 7 goals

Assists Leader

- 1983–84 Steve Zungul (indoor) 56 assists
- 1988 Dzung Tran 4 assists (tied with 2 others)

All-Star First Team selections

- 1974 Paul Child
- 1976 António Simões
- 1983 Stan Terlecki, Steve Zungul
- 1984 Steve Zungul
- 1986 Chance Fry
- 1987 Barney Boyce, Tim Martin, Joe Mihaljevic, George Pastor, Robbie Zipp
- 1988 Tomás Boy, Abuelo Cruz

All-Star Second Team selections

- 1981 George Best
- 1984 Branko Šegota
- 1986 Dzung Tran
- 1988 Chris Dangerfield, Dzung Tran

All-Star Honorable Mentions

- 1974 Laurie Calloway, Dieter Zajdel
- 1976 Mark Liveric
- 1977 António Simões
- 1982 Vince Hilaire, Godfrey Ingram
- 1983 Mihalj Keri
- 1984 Fernando Clavijo

Indoor All-Star/All-Tournament selections

- 1975 Paul Child, Gabbo Garvic
- 1976 Juli Veee
- 1980–81 George Best, Mike Hewitt
- 1983–84 Fernando Clavijo, Steve Zungul

Indoor All-Star Game selections

- 1984 Fernando Clavijo, Steve Zungul (starters)

U.S. Soccer Hall of Fame

- 1997 Johnny Moore
- 2003 Paul Child
- 2005 Fernando Clavijo
- 2023 Steve Zungul

Canadian Soccer Hall of Fame

- 2001 Gerry Gray
- 2002 Branko Šegota, Mike Sweeney
- 2009 Mike Stojanović
- 2011 Victor Kodelja

Indoor Soccer Hall of Fame

- 2012 Don Popovic, Branko Šegota, Juli Veee, Steve Zungul
- 2014 Fernando Clavijo
- 2019 Stan Terlecki
