= California Kickers =

Californian soccer (football) team

The California Kickers were an American soccer club based in Hollywood, California. They joined the Western Soccer Alliance in 1986. They initially played as Hollywood Kickers before changing their name for the following season. In 1990, the team name was changed again, becoming the California Emperors when they joined the American Professional Soccer League. After the 1991 season, the team left the league to become an amateur club.

== History ==
In 1986 the first year the Kickers held open tryouts for the highest adult level players along with Collegiate players looking to play professional soccer, which was scarce once NASL folded their teams. On this first roster, there were standout local plays like: Martín Vásquez (Cal State LA and former indoor player for LA Lazers), Alberto Bru (Cal State LA player), Steve Singleman (Cal State LA), and Mike Page (Cal State LA), Mike Getchel (UCLA), Paul Krumpe (UCLA), Steve Ledezzma (Simi Valley High School), Rudy Ybarra (Former LA Aztecs and Santa Barbara), Armando Ceja (Cal State LA), Daniel Behrendt (UC Berkeley), Brian Myrdal (Mt. San Antonio) Getulio (Brazilian International player, São Paulo Brazil) Short season and no playoffs the Hollywood Kickers played consistently to win the first title of the Western Soccer Alliance expansion.

Their home field was Tom Bradley Stadium at Birmingham High in Van Nuys, California. Their general manager and coach was Dieter Hochheimer, who had played football professionally in West Germany.

== Record ==
Year	Team Name	League	Reg. season	Playoffs
1986	Hollywood Kickers	WSA	1st	Champion (no playoffs)
1987	California Kickers	WSA	6th	Did not qualify
1988		WSA	5th	Did not qualify
1989		WSL	5th, South	Did not qualify
1990	California Emperors	APSL	1st, WSL South	WSL Semifinals

== Owners ==
- Jaime Legaspi and Dean Foley ( 1990–2004 )
- John Ajemian (1987–1989)

== Notable people ==
- Dieter Hochheimer
