= Western Soccer Alliance =

Professional soccer league

The Western Soccer Alliance was a professional soccer league featuring teams from the West Coast of the United States and Western Canada. The league began in 1985 as the Western Alliance Challenge Series. In 1986, it became the Western Soccer Alliance. In 1989, it existed for a single year as the Western Soccer League before merging with the American Soccer League to form the American Professional Soccer League in 1990.

== History ==
=== Origins ===
After the demise of the North American Soccer League in 1984 and the United Soccer League in 1985, four independent teams—F.C. Portland, F.C. Seattle, San Jose Earthquakes and Victoria Riptides—created the Western Alliance Challenge Series in the summer of 1985. They did so in order to fill the outdoor soccer void created by the failure of the NASL and USL. The Western Alliance Challenge Series would have had two more teams from Los Angeles and Edmonton, but the Los Angeles team could not obtain change or add dates on a stadium lease, and the Edmonton team was unable to accommodate additional games. Many top outdoor players now languished in local semi-pro or recreational leagues. These players, along with local soccer officials, began parallel, but independent efforts to create local "super clubs". These "super clubs" then challenged other independent teams to games for little more than bragging rights. For example, in 1984 F. C. Seattle hosted the Seattle Challenge Series against the Vancouver Whitecaps, Minnesota Strikers, New York Cosmos and U.S. Olympic Team. Other teams held similar challenge series and it was from these efforts that the Western Alliance Challenge Series was born.

Two of the Challenge Series' teams, F.C. Portland and F. C. Seattle were amateur teams. The other two, Victoria Riptide and San Jose Earthquakes, were barely professional although the majority of the players had prior professional experience in the NASL. However, all four teams drew their players from the ranks of ex-NASL players, local semi-pro teams, or local colleges and universities. By keeping their teams independent and amateur, Seattle and Portland could use college players without those players losing their NCAA soccer eligibility. Despite the low key nature of the teams and the loose "alliance" versus "league", the WSA would go on to attract some of the top American players of the late 1980s and early 1990s. A few of the more noteworthy alumni include Marcelo Balboa (San Diego Nomads), Paul Caligiuri (San Diego Nomads) and Kasey Keller (F.C. Portland). Others players which came through the league included John Doyle, Mike Lapper, Cle Kooiman, Hugo Perez, Dominic Kinnear, Paul Krumpe and John Stollmeyer.

=== 1985 Western Alliance Challenge Series ===
In 1985, the first year of the series, the teams played a round robin, home and away tournament, called the Western Alliance Challenge Series. One of the more distinctive features of this series was the inclusion of games against outside teams, which counted in the final rankings. In this first year, the four teams played against Edmonton Brick Men and Canada. However, only the games with the Brick Men counted in the rankings. F.C. Portland hosted the first game of the series, playing F.C. Seattle in the Portland Civic Stadium. While only 2,906 fans attended this first game, the series gained significant positive attention in the U.S. soccer press.

The collapse of the NASL had shaken the U.S. soccer community, which had hoped that soccer, led by the NASL, would become quickly established as a major U.S. sport. In hindsight, it became obvious that the NASL had overexpanded. This brought teams into the league which were not financially solvent. The four WSA teams intended to use the lessons of the NASL to avoid the failure of that league. First they maintained a loose organization, using the name alliance in order to stress the semi-pro nature of the WSA. They also reduced roster costs by using the semi-pro and amateur players mentioned earlier. The regional nature of the alliance also helped minimize travel costs. Despite the good early intentions, the WSA would in many ways mimic the rise and fall of the NASL.

The success of the 1985 challenge series led the four teams into discussions regarding the establishment of something more than the ad hoc tournament of the first year. F.C. Portland, F. C. Seattle and the San Jose Earthquakes voted to create the Western Soccer Alliance and elected San Jose Earthquakes president, Peter Bridgwater, as the league's first commissioner. The Victoria Riptides disagreed and withdrew, but was replaced by the Edmonton Brick Men. Several other independent west coast teams which wanted to play beyond their local leagues also requested to join the new alliance. These included the Hollywood Kickers, Los Angeles Heat and San Diego Nomads. The WSA continued the first year practice of playing outside teams (Manchester City and Dundee this year) with results counting in the alliance standings. Each team played 16 games and the champion was crowned based on end of year standings. The alliance would not have a post season until 1987.

=== 1986–1988: Western Soccer Alliance ===
When the Western Soccer Alliance began its 1986 season, it was the lone U.S. "professional" outdoor league. Two professional indoor leagues did exist: the MISL and the AISA. The NASL had folded in 1984. The United Soccer League had lasted only two years, 1984 and 1985. The second American Soccer League had collapsed in 1983 and the third version of the league would not begin playing until 1988. Finally, the Lone Star Soccer Alliance would not begin play until 1987. Because of this, the WSA attracted many of the top U.S. outdoor players. Some of these players also played in the MISL or AISA during the winter so they could accept smaller salaries in the summer.

In 1987, the league saw little change, except for the Edmonton Brick Men leaving to join the newly established Canadian Soccer League. The Hollywood Kickers also changed its name to the California Kickers. With the loss of Edmonton, the alliance reduced the number of games from 12 to 10. The alliance also established a three-team, post-season. At the end of the season, the top three teams were, in order, the San Diego Nomads, F. C. Seattle and San Jose Earthquakes. In the "wild card" game, San Jose defeated Seattle 3–0. However, San Jose's success ended there when the Nomads defeated them 3–1 in the championship game.

In 1988, The alliance kept the same teams as the 1987 season, but played 12 games, including games against two Canadian Soccer League teams, the Calgary Kickers and Vancouver 86ers. The Seattle team, which had been known variably as F.C. Seattle, and the F.C. Seattle Storm, dropped the "F.C." from its name and became officially the Seattle Storm. The league also began naming an All Star team. The alliance continued its practice from 1987 of playing only two post-season games, a "wild card" game and championship. This year, San Jose defeated San Diego 1–1 (6–5 PK) in penalty kicks. On July 30, 1987, Seattle gained revenge on San Jose for its 1987 wild card defeat by crushing the Earthquakes, 5–0, at Seattle's Memorial Stadium.

=== 1989: Western Soccer League ===
The Western Soccer Alliance had seen nothing but success since its inception as a challenge cup in 1985. In 1989, it continued to build for the future. The alliance decided to become a formal league and with it came a name change to the Western Soccer League (WSL), with Bill Sage as league chairman. The WSL also added three new teams, Real Santa Barbara, Arizona Condors and Sacramento Senators. Several established teams also saw name changes, the San Jose Earthquakes became the San Francisco Bay Blackhawks and F.C. Portland resurrected the old local NASL name and became the Portland Timbers. With the additional teams came a change in the league structure. Through the 1988 season, the WSA played as a single Division. With the addition of more teams, the league split into two divisions – North and South. The North Division comprised the San Francisco Bay Blackhawks, Portland Timbers, Seattle Storm and newly added Sacramento Senators. The South Division had the San Diego Nomads, Los Angeles Heat, California Kickers and two new teams, Real Santa Barbara and the Arizona Condors.

As the league began its 1989 season, things appeared to be going well, but the seeds of the WSL's eventual collapse had now been sown. The league, only four years from its founding as a semi-pro challenge cup, was now officially a league with two separate divisions and three new franchises. Salary and travel costs also began to rise as the league began to plan for the possibility of becoming a new national soccer league, similar to the NASL in its heyday. One of the factors pushing the WSL in this direction was the creation of the third version of the American Soccer League on the east coast. Another was the announcement in July 1988 that USSF intended to create a national, first division league in the United States to fulfill a FIFA requirement for the award of the 1994 FIFA World Cup to the United States. The WSL was concerned that USSF would designate the new ASL as the Division One league, leaving the WSL as a permanent minor league. In February 1989, the ASL and WSL announced they would merge for the 1990 season.

The 1989 season continued much as the season before, except for post season play, the league replaced the former "wild card" game with two semi-final games in which the top teams in the two divisions played the second place team in the other division. In the first semi-final, San Francisco Bay defeated Los Angeles 1–1(2–1 PK). In the other semifinal, San Diego defeated Portland 2–1. The championship game became a defensive battle, with San Diego defeating San Francisco Bay 1–0.

Following this game, the San Diego Nomads played the Fort Lauderdale Strikers of the ASL in the 1989 National Pro Soccer Championship in order to crown a "national" champion. The game, played before 8,632 fans in San Jose's Spartan Stadium on September 9, 1989, remained scoreless until the 74th minute when San Diego's Jerome Watson scored on a Thien Nguyen free kick. Just over a minute later, national team forward Eric Eichmann scored for Fort Lauderdale. His strike was followed by one from Troy Edwards from a Marcelo Carrera assist in the 85th minute. Marcelo Carrera got a goal to join his assist when he scored in the 90th minute on an assist from Victor Moreland. The game was televised live by Pacific Sports Network. JP Dellacamera provided play by play and Rick Davis added color commentary.

=== 1990: Merger with the ASL ===
In 1990, the WSL formally merged with the American Soccer League (ASL) to form the American Professional Soccer League which would itself one day become known as the A-League, be absorbed by the United Soccer Leagues and be called USL-1, the predecessor to USL Pro. Despite the hopes of the WSL leadership, USSF did not designate the new APSL as the top U.S. league. That honor would eventually go Major League Soccer which began play in 1996. Instead, the WSL had a much less dignified end. At the end of the 1990 APSL season, nearly all of the 1989 WSL teams folded, leaving only the San Francisco Bay Blackhawks to carry on as the lone WSA/WSL survivor in the APSL.

== Teams ==
- Arizona Condors (1989)
- California Kickers (1987–1989); Hollywood Kickers (1986)
- Edmonton Brick Men (1986)
- Los Angeles Heat (1986–1989)
- F.C. Portland (1985–1988); Portland Timbers (1989)
- New Mexico Chiles (1990)
- Real Santa Barbara (1989–1990)
- Sacramento Senators (1989)
- San Diego Nomads (1986–1989)
- San Francisco Bay Blackhawks (1989)
- San Jose Earthquakes (1985–1988)
- F.C. Seattle (1985–1987); Seattle Storm (1988–89)
- Victoria Riptides (1985)

== Champions ==
WSA Championship
Season	Winner	Runners-up	Top scorer
1985	San Jose Earthquakes	Victoria Riptides	
1986	Hollywood Kickers	F.C. Portland	Brent Goulet
1987	San Diego Nomads	F.C. Seattle	Joe Mihaljevic
1988	F.C. Seattle Storm	San Jose Earthquakes	Scott Benedetti
1989	San Diego Nomads	San Francisco Bay Blackhawks	Steve Corpening

ASL/WSL Championship
Year	Winner	Score	Runners-up	Venue	Location	Attendance
1989	Fort Lauderdale Strikers	3–1	San Diego Nomads	Spartan Stadium	San Jose, California	8,632

== Individual honors ==
MVP

- 1986: Paul Caligiuri, San Diego Nomads
- 1987: Brent Goulet, F.C. Portland
- 1988: Marcelo Balboa, San Diego Nomads
- 1989: Kasey Keller, Portland Timbers
