= 1984 Minnesota Strikers season =

Minnesota Strikers
1984 season
- Owner: (United States) Elizabeth Robbie
- Manager: (England) David Chadwick
- Stadium: The Metrodome
- NASL: Western Division: third place
- Top goalscorer: League: (Socialist Federal Republic of Yugoslavia) Steve Zungul (20 goals); All: (Socialist Federal Republic of Yugoslavia) Steve Zungul (20 goals)
Home colors	Away colors

The 1984 Minnesota Strikers season of the North American Soccer League was the first season of the new team, and the club's eighteenth season in professional soccer. It is also the first ever incarnation of the club's new name. Previously, they were known as the Fort Lauderdale Strikers. This was the first time the club played in the Western Division. They finished in third place and did not make the playoffs that year. After the league ended in 1984, the club folded the outdoor team and placed an indoor team in the Major Indoor Soccer League during the 1984–85 season, and continued to do so until 1988.

== Competitions ==
=== NASL regular season ===
W = Wins, L = Losses, GF = Goals For, GA = Goals Against, BP = Bonus Points, Pts= point system

6 points for a win, 4 points for a shootout win, 0 points for a loss, 1 point for each regulation goal scored up to three per game.

Eastern Division	W	L	GF	GA	BP	Pts	Home	Road
Chicago Sting	13	11	50	49	44	120	6-6	7-5
Toronto Blizzard	14	10	46	33	35	117	9-3	5-7
New York Cosmos	13	11	43	42	39	115	9-3	4-8
Tampa Bay Rowdies	9	15	43	61	35	87	9-3	0-12

Western Division	W	L	GF	GA	BP	Pts	Home	Road
San Diego Sockers	14	10	51	42	40	118	9-3	5-7
Vancouver Whitecaps	13	11	51	48	43	117	10-2	3-9
Minnesota Strikers	14	10	40	44	35	115	8-4	6-6
Tulsa Roughnecks	10	14	42	46	38	98	8-4	2-10
Golden Bay Earthquakes	8	16	61	62	49	95	4-8	4-8

==== Scoring leaders ====
GP = Games Played, G = Goals (worth 2 points), A = Assists (worth 1 point), Pts = Points

Player	Team	GP	G	A	Pts
Steve Zungul	Golden Bay Earthquakes	24	20	10	50
Branko Šegota	Golden Bay Earthquakes	24	18	11	47
Ron Futcher	Tulsa Roughnecks	23	18	8	44
Karl-Heinz Granitza	Chicago Sting	24	16	12	44
Peter Ward	Vancouver Whitecaps	24	16	10	42
Ade Coker	San Diego Sockers	22	16	7	39
David Byrne	Toronto Blizzard	20	12	13	37
Alan Willey	Minnesota Strikers	24	15	4	34
Jean Willrich	San Diego Sockers	22	5	20	30
Roberto Bettega	Toronto Blizzard	23	8	13	29

==== Leading Goalkeepers ====
Note: GP = Games played; Min = Minutes played; GA = Goals against; GAA = Goals against average; W = Wins; L = Losses; SO = Shutouts

Player	Team	GP	Min	GA	GAA	W	L	SO
Paul Hammond	Toronto Blizzard	21	1937	25	1.16	14	7	7
Hubert Birkenmeier	New York Cosmos	22	2007	34	1.50	13	9	2
Tino Lettieri	Minnesota Strikers	18	1622	28	1.55	10	8	4
Victor Nogueira	Chicago Sting	18	1663	30	1.62	9	9	3
Winston DuBose	Tulsa Roughnecks	22	1931	38	1.77	10	12	4
Paul Bradshaw	Vancouver Whitecaps	24	2161	46	1.92	13	11	4
Jim Gorsek	San Diego Sockers	15	1369	32	2.10	7	7	0
Arnie Mausser	Tampa Bay Rowdies	23	2100	57	2.44	9	14	3
Bill Irwin	Golden Bay Earthquakes	21	1964	54	2.48	7	14	2

=== NASL Playoffs ===
Did not qualify
