= 1984 North American Soccer League season =

Soccer league season

North American Soccer League 1984 season
- Season: 1984
- Teams: 9
- Champions: Chicago Sting (2nd title)
- Premiers: Chicago Sting most total points *San Diego best Won/Loss record
- Matches: 108
- Goals: 427 (3.95 per match)
- Top goalscorer: (Socialist Federal Republic of Yugoslavia) Steve Zungul (20 goals)
- Highest attendance: 52,621; Tampa Bay at Minnesota (May 28)
- Lowest attendance: 2,267; Tampa Bay at San Diego (August 12)
- Average attendance: 10,759

The 1984 North American Soccer League season was the 72nd season of FIFA-sanctioned soccer, the 17th with a national first-division league, in the United States and Canada. It was the 17th and final season of the NASL.

== Changes from the previous season ==
=== New teams ===
- None

=== Teams folding ===
- Montreal Manic
- Seattle Sounders
- Team America

=== Teams moving ===
- Fort Lauderdale to Minnesota

=== Name changes ===
- None

== Map of clubs ==
Eastern Division Western Division

== Season recap ==
By 1983, the NASL had shrunk to half of the 24 teams that made up the league in 1980. The ongoing salary war with the Major Indoor Soccer League had taken its toll, along with shrinking attendance and a lack of interest from American network TV broadcasters. The league made plans to have both an outdoor and indoor presence, with a 24-game outdoor season and 40-game indoor season scheduled for 1984 and beyond.

The off-season following the 1983 outdoor playoffs saw three more teams fall by the wayside: the Montreal Manic, Seattle Sounders and Team America would all fold. The Fort Lauderdale Strikers decided to move to Minnesota because of a lack of suitable indoor arenas in Southeastern Florida. Things had gotten so bad for the league that the champion Tulsa Roughnecks almost folded two weeks after winning the Soccer Bowl. They survived, thanks to a fundraiser that put $65,000 in the team's coffers. The league would soldier on with nine teams. While there would not be huge changes on the field, the single game Soccer Bowl would be no more. The league moved to a best-of-three championship series format, as was done back in the 1971 Final. The revised NASL playoff format had the two division winners and the two next best teams qualify. The four teams would be seeded 1 through 4.

When the season finally got underway in May, the nine teams were bunched together for most of the year as six teams finished within five points of each other. A hoped-for renaissance in New York never materialized, as the return of former Cosmos coach Eddie Firmani did not lead the team back to the playoffs. Rumors about a possible return by Pelé proved to be without merit. However, not everyone struggled on the field. In Oakland, Steve Zungul and Branko Segota were able to translate their talents from the MISL to the outdoor game, finishing 1–2 in the league's scoring race. Zungul would earn league MVP honors despite the Golden Bay Earthquakes' last-place finish. For the fifth time (and second year in a row), the NASL's points system rewarded a team other than the one with the best record (Chicago instead of San Diego) the regular season title and number one playoff seed. Moreover, Toronto and Minnesota also had better won-loss records than Chicago. Minnesota would not even qualify for the playoffs, despite having a better record than both Chicago and Vancouver.

The Chicago Sting won the last NASL title with a two-game sweep over the Toronto Blizzard. The Sting needed a last-second victory over the Cosmos in their regular season finale to qualify for the playoffs and knock New York out. In the playoffs they won a deciding game over the Vancouver Whitecaps, who themselves only made the playoffs thanks to the Cosmos' loss. Vancouver's Bob Lenarduzzi scored the quickest goal in NASL playoff history 46 seconds into the match, but Chicago rallied for the win.

There were still plans for a 1985 outdoor season as the year ended, but the departures of Chicago Sting, Minnesota Strikers, New York Cosmos and the San Diego Sockers to the MISL for the indoor season made that difficult. The Cosmos left both the NASL and MISL on February 22. A month later, on March 28, 1985, the NASL suspended operations when only Toronto and Minnesota were interested in fielding teams for a 1985 "outdoor" season.

== Regular season ==
W = Wins, L = Losses, GF = Goals For, GA = Goals Against, BP = Bonus Points, Pts= point system

6 points for a win, 4 points for a shootout win, 0 points for a loss, 1 point for each regulation goal scored up to three per game.

-Premiers (most points). -Best record. -Other playoff team. -Tied for best record but did not qualify for playoffs.

Eastern Division	W	L	GF	GA	BP	Pts	Home	Road
Chicago Sting	13	11	50	49	44	120	6-6	7-5
Toronto Blizzard	14	10	46	33	35	117	9-3	5-7
New York Cosmos	13	11	43	42	39	115	9-3	4-8
Tampa Bay Rowdies	9	15	43	61	35	87	9-3	0-12

Western Division	W	L	GF	GA	BP	Pts	Home	Road
San Diego Sockers	14	10	51	42	40	118	9-3	5-7
Vancouver Whitecaps	13	11	51	48	43	117	10-2	3-9
Minnesota Strikers	14	10	40	44	35	115	8-4	6-6
Tulsa Roughnecks	10	14	42	46	38	98	8-4	2-10
Golden Bay Earthquakes	8	16	61	62	49	95	4-8	4-8

=== Scoring Leaders ===
GP = Games Played, G = Goals (worth 2 points), A = Assists (worth 1 point), Pts = Points

Player	Team	GP	G	A	Pts
(Socialist Federal Republic of Yugoslavia) Steve Zungul	Golden Bay Earthquakes	24	20	10	50
(Canada) Branko Šegota	Golden Bay Earthquakes	24	18	11	47
(England) Ron Futcher	Tulsa Roughnecks	23	18	8	44
(Germany) Karl-Heinz Granitza	Chicago Sting	24	16	12	44
(England) Peter Ward	Vancouver Whitecaps	24	16	10	42
(United States) Ade Coker	San Diego Sockers	22	16	7	39
(South Africa) David Byrne	Toronto Blizzard	20	12	13	37
(England) Alan Willey	Minnesota Strikers	24	15	4	34
(Germany) Jean Willrich	San Diego Sockers	22	5	20	30
(Italy) Roberto Bettega	Toronto Blizzard	23	8	13	29

=== Leading Goalkeepers ===
Note: GP = Games played; Min - Minutes played; GA = Goals against; GAA = Goals against average; W = Wins; L = Losses; SO = Shutouts

Player	Team	GP	Min	GA	GAA	W	L	SO
(England) Paul Hammond	Toronto Blizzard	21	1937	25	1.16	14	7	7
(Germany) Hubert Birkenmeier	New York Cosmos	22	2007	34	1.50	13	9	2
(Canada) Tino Lettieri	Minnesota Strikers	18	1622	28	1.55	10	8	4
(United States) Victor Nogueira	Chicago Sting	18	1663	30	1.62	9	9	3
(United States) Winston DuBose	Tulsa Roughnecks	22	1931	38	1.77	10	12	4
(England) Paul Bradshaw	Vancouver Whitecaps	24	2161	46	1.92	13	11	4
(United States) Jim Gorsek	San Diego Sockers	15	1369	32	2.10	7	7	0
(United States) Arnie Mausser	Tampa Bay Rowdies	23	2100	57	2.44	9	14	3
(Northern Ireland) Bill Irwin	Golden Bay Earthquakes	21	1964	54	2.48	7	14	2

== All-NASL Teams ==
First Team	Position	Second Team	Honorable Mention
(Germany) Hubert Birkenmeier, New York	G	(England) Paul Hammond, Toronto	(England) Paul Bradshaw, Vancouver
(Iran) Andranik Eskandarian, New York	D	(Netherlands) Dwight Lodeweges, Minnesota	(United States) Gregg Thompson, Tampa Bay
(Netherlands) Johan Neeskens, New York	D	(Northern Ireland) Victor Moreland, Tulsa	(United States) Fernando Clavijo, Golden Bay
(United States) Kevin Crow, San Diego	D	(Canada) Bob Lenarduzzi, Vancouver	(United States) Dan Canter, New York
(Canada) Bruce Wilson, Toronto	D	(Canada) Terry Moore, Tulsa	(England) Barry Wallace, Minnesota
(England) Ray Hudson, Minnesota	M	(Argentina) Pato Margetic, Chicago	(Poland) Kaz Deyna, San Diego
(Netherlands) Frans Thijssen, Vancouver	M	(Northern Ireland) Jimmy Nicholl, Toronto	(United States) Brian Quinn, San Diego
(Socialist Federal Republic of Yugoslavia) Vladislav Bogićević, New York	M	(Republic of Ireland) Fran O'Brien, Vancouver	(South Africa) Ace Ntsoelengoe, Toronto
(Socialist Federal Republic of Yugoslavia) Steve Zungul, Golden Bay	F	(England) Alan Willey, Minnesota	(Canada) Carl Valentine, Vancouver
(Germany) Karl-Heinz Granitza, Chicago	F	(Canada) Branko Šegota, Golden Bay	(Paraguay) Roberto Cabañas, New York
(England) Peter Ward, Vancouver	F	(South Africa) David Byrne, Toronto	(England) Ron Futcher, Tulsa

== Playoffs ==
Top team from each division qualified automatically. The next two teams with the highest point totals qualified regardless of which division they were in.

=== Bracket ===
Semifinals; Best-of-3
1	Chicago Sting	0	3	4
4	Vancouver Whitecaps	1	1	3
2	San Diego Sockers	1	0	–
3	Toronto Blizzard	2	1	–

Soccer Bowl Series '84; Best-of-3
1	Chicago Sting	2	3	–
3	Toronto Blizzard	1	2	–

=== Semifinals ===
Higher seed	Series	Lower seed	Game 1	Game 2	Game 3	*(higher seed hosts Games 1 and 3)
Chicago Sting	2 - 1	Vancouver Whitecaps	0–1 (OT)	3–1	4–3	September 18 • Comiskey Park • 5,484; September 23 • BC Place Stadium • 14,753; September 28 • Comiskey Park • 10,139
San Diego Sockers	0 - 2	Toronto Blizzard	1–2	0–1	x	September 18 • Jack Murphy Stadium • 4,204; September 21 • Varsity Stadium • 12,460

=== Soccer Bowl Series '84 ===
Higher seed	Series	Lower seed	Game 1	Game 2	Game 3	*(higher seed hosts Games 1 and 3)
Chicago Sting	2 - 0	Toronto Blizzard	2–1	3–2	x	October 1 • Comiskey Park • 8,352; October 3 • Varsity Stadium • 16,842

==== Game One ====
October 1

Chicago Sting	2–1	Toronto Blizzard
Margetic; Rojas (85:20)		Wilson

Comiskey Park, Chicago
Attendance: 8,352
Referee: David Socha (USA)

==== Game Two ====
October 3

Toronto Blizzard	2–3	Chicago Sting
Paskin (70:55); Bettega		Simanton (16:47); Margetic; Margetic (81:33)

Varsity Stadium, Toronto
Attendance: 16,842
Referee: Bill Maxwell (USA)

1984 NASL Champions: Chicago Sting

=== Playoff Scoring Leaders ===
GP = Games Played, G = Goals (worth 2 points), A = Assists (worth 1 point), Pts = Points

Player	Team	GP	G	A	Pts
(Argentina) Pato Margetic	Chicago Sting	5	6	1	13
(Germany) Karl-Heinz Granitza	Chicago Sting	5	3	6	12
(Chile) Manny Rojas	Chicago Sting	5	2	3	7
(South Africa) Ace Ntsoelengoe	Toronto Blizzard	4	1	3	5
(South Africa) David Byrne	Toronto Blizzard	4	1	2	4
(Italy) Roberto Bettega	Toronto Blizzard	4	1	2	4

=== Playoff Leading Goalkeepers ===
Note: GP = Games played; Min - Minutes played; GA = Goals against; GAA = Goals against average; W = Wins; L = Losses; SO = Shutouts

Player	Team	GP	Min	GA	GAA	W	L	SO
(England) Paul Hammond	Toronto Blizzard	4	360	6	1.50	2	2	1
(Hungary) Zoltan Toth	San Diego Sockers	2	180	3	1.50	0	2	0
(United States) Victor Nogueira	Chicago Sting	5	459	8	1.60	4	1	0
(England) Paul Bradshaw	Vancouver Whitecaps	3	279	7	2.33	1	2	0

== Post season awards ==
- Most Valuable Player: (Socialist Federal Republic of Yugoslavia) Steve Zungul, Golden Bay
- Coach Of The Year: (England) Ron Newman, San Diego
- Rookie Of The Year: (United States) Roy Wegerle, Tampa Bay
- North American Player of the Year: (Canada) Branko Šegota, Golden Bay

== Team Attendance Totals ==
Club	Games	Total	Average
Vancouver Whitecaps	12	182,494	15,208
Minnesota Strikers	12	171,151	14,263
New York Cosmos	12	153,807	12,817
Toronto Blizzard	12	137,420	11,452
Tampa Bay Rowdies	12	131,194	10,933
Golden Bay Earthquakes	12	123,383	10,282
Chicago Sting	12	100,512	8,376
Tulsa Roughnecks	12	93,567	7,797
San Diego Sockers	12	68,422	5,702
OVERALL	108	1,161,950	10,759
