= 1982 San Jose Earthquakes season =

San Jose Earthquakes
1982 season
- Coach: Joe Mallett
- Stadium: Spartan Stadium
- NASL: Division: 5th Overall: 11th
- NASL Playoffs: Did not qualify
- National Challenge Cup: Did not enter
- Top goalscorer: Godfrey Ingram (17)
- Average home league attendance: 11,012

The 1982 San Jose Earthquakes season was the ninth for the franchise in the North American Soccer League. They finished fifth in the Western Division.

== Squad ==
The 1982 squad

Note: Flags indicate national team as defined under FIFA eligibility rules; some limited exceptions apply. Players may hold more than one non-FIFA nationality.

No.	Pos.	Nation	Player
1	GK	USA	Billy Phillips
2	DF	ENG	Paul Cahill
3	DF	USA	Mike Hunter
4	DF	USA	Jim McAlister
5	DF	ENG	Steve Litt
6	DF	ENG	Tony Powell
7	FW	ENG	Chris Dangerfield
8	DF	NED	Wim Suurbier
9	MF	USA	Joe Morrone
10	MF	ENG	Vince Hilaire
12	MF	MEX	Leonardo Cuellar
13	FW	USA	Tony Crescitelli

No.	Pos.	Nation	Player
—	MF	USA	Eric Tate
14	MF	USA	Todd Saldana
14	DF	YUG	Mihalj Keri
15	FW	USA	Easy Perez
16	FW	ENG	Godfrey Ingram
17	FW	USA	Ole Mikkelsen
18	FW	ENG	Ian Hamilton
19	FW	CAN	Mike Stojanovic
20	MF	USA	Gary Etherington
21	MF	USA	Joe Silveira
22	DF	USA	Barney Boyce
23	MF	TUR	Adnan Sezgin
24	GK	SCO	Mike Hewitt

== Competitions ==
=== NASL ===
==== Season ====
Date	Opponent	Venue	Result	Scorers
April 11, 1982	Seattle Sounders	A	0–0*	
April 18, 1982	San Diego Sockers	H	0–3	
April 25, 1982	Edmonton Drillers	H	1–2	Ingram
May 2, 1982	Edmonton Drillers	A	0–2	
May 5, 1982	Vancouver Whitecaps	H	2–0	Ingram, Etherington
May 8, 1982	Jacksonville Tea Men	A	4–1	Ingram (2), Crescitelli (2)
May 10, 1982	Toronto Blizzard	H	2–1	Ingram, Crescitelli
May 15, 1982	Fort Lauderdale Strikers	H	0–2	
May 22, 1982	Tampa Bay Rowdies	H	6–2	Crescitelli, Powell, Etherington, Dangerfield (2), Hilaire
May 26, 1982	Portland Timbers	A	1–0	Ingram
May 29, 1982	San Diego Sockers	A	1–0	Etherington
June 2, 1982	Vancouver Whitecaps	H	1–2	Dangerfield
June 5, 1982	Montreal Manic	H	4–1	Ingram (2), Etherington, Dangerfield
June 12, 1982	Tulsa Roughnecks	H	3–2	Crescitelli (2), Ingram
June 16, 1982	San Diego Sockers	H	3–2	Ingram (2), Crescitelli
June 19, 1982	Toronto Blizzard	A	0–7	
June 23, 1982	Tampa Bay Rowdies	A	1–2	Hamilton
June 26, 1982	Fort Lauderdale Strikers	A	2–3	Dangerfield, Ingram
June 30, 1982	New York Cosmos	H	4–2	Ingram (2), Hilaire (2)
July 3, 1982	Seattle Sounders	A	4–5	Stojanovic, Dangerfield (2)
July 7, 1982	Vancouver Whitecaps	A	1–0	Dangerfield
July 10, 1982	Portland Timbers	H	0–2	
July 14, 1982	Chicago Sting	H	1–3	Ingram
July 17, 1982	Jacksonville Tea Men	H	1–0	Ingram
July 24, 1982	Montreal Manic	A	1–2	Stojanovic
July 28, 1982	New York Cosmos	A	1–2	Etherington
July 31, 1982	Chicago Sting	A	1–2	Ingram
August 4, 1982	Edmonton Drillers	A	0–1	
August 7, 1982	Seattle Sounders	H	1–2	Dangerfield
August 14, 1982	Portland Timbers	H	0–2	
August 18, 1982	San Diego Sockers	A	0–5	
August 21, 1982	Tulsa Roughnecks	A	0–2	

* = Shootout

==== Standings ====
Western Division	W	L	GF	GA	PT
Seattle Sounders	18	14	72	48	166
San Diego Sockers	19	13	71	54	162
Vancouver Whitecaps	20	12	58	48	160
Portland Timbers	14	18	49	44	122
San Jose Earthquakes	13	19	47	62	114
Edmonton Drillers	11	21	38	65	93
