= 1981 San Jose Earthquakes season =

San Jose Earthquakes
1981 season
- Coach: Jim Gabriel
- Stadium: Spartan Stadium
- NASL: Division: 4th Overall: 19th
- NASL Playoffs: Did not qualify
- National Challenge Cup: Did not enter
- Top goalscorer: George Best (13)
- Average home league attendance: 12,400

The 1981 San Jose Earthquakes season was the eighth for the franchise in the North American Soccer League. They finished in fourth place in the Western Division.

== Squad ==
The 1981 squad

Note: Flags indicate national team as defined under FIFA eligibility rules; some limited exceptions apply. Players may hold more than one non-FIFA nationality.

No.	Pos.	Nation	Player
00	GK	ENG	Phil Parkes
1	GK	USA	Bob Stetler
2	DF	ENG	Paul Cahill
2	MF	USA	Alan Merrick
3	DF	USA	Mike Hunter
4	DF	USA	Jim McAlister
5	DF	YUG	Vasa Rutonjski
6	DF	ENG	Tony Powell
7	FW	TTO	Steve David
8	MF	HUN	Joe Horvath
11	FW	NIR	George Best
12	FW	YUG	Slavko Licinar

No.	Pos.	Nation	Player
13	FW	USA	Tony Crescitelli
14	MF	ENG	Mark Lindsay
15	FW	USA	Easy Perez
16	MF	YUG	Mustafa Hukic
17	MF	USA	Tim Schulz
18	FW	ENG	David Irving
19	DF	USA	Bill Sautter
20	MF	USA	Gary Etherington
21	MF	USA	Joe Silveira
24	GK	SCO	Mike Hewitt
25	DF	USA	Derek Evans
25	FW	USA	Mark Liveric

== Competitions ==
=== NASL ===
==== Season ====
Date	Opponent	Venue	Result	Scorers
March 29, 1981	New York Cosmos	H	0–3	
April 5, 1981	Los Angeles Aztecs	A	0–1	
April 12, 1981	Jacksonville Tea Men	H	3–0	Etherington, David (2)
April 19, 1981	San Diego Sockers	H	2–1	Licinar, Best
April 26, 1981	California Surf	H	0–1	
May 2, 1981	San Diego Sockers	A	2–4	Best, Crescitelli
May 6, 1981	Portland Timbers	A	0–3	
May 10, 1981	Edmonton Drillers	H	1–0	David
May 15, 1981	California Surf	A	2–1	Best, Horvath
May 19, 1981	Atlanta Chiefs	A	0–2	
May 24, 1981	Calgary Boomers	A	0–1	
May 27, 1981	Los Angeles Aztecs	H	3–2	Liveric, Crescitelli, Hunter
May 31, 1981	Calgary Boomers	H	4–3	Best (2), Lindsay, Crescitelli
June 7, 1981	Tampa Bay Rowdies	H	2–1	Crescitelli, Horvath
June 14, 1981	Edmonton Drillers	A	2–6	Liveric, Irving
June 17, 1981	Atlanta Chiefs	H	3–1	Etherington, Best, Crescitelli
June 20, 1981	Seattle Sounders	A	0–1	
June 24, 1981	California Surf	A	0–7	
June 27, 1981	Los Angeles Aztecs	H	1–2	Best
July 1, 1981	Vancouver Whitecaps	H	1–5	Licinar
July 4, 1981	Fort Lauderdale Strikers	A	1–4	
July 8, 1981	Tampa Bay Rowdies	A	2–4	Best, Perez
July 11, 1981	Jacksonville Tea Men	A	3–4	Crescitelli, Best, Irving
July 15, 1981	Montreal Manic	A	0–4	
July 22, 1981	Fort Lauderdale Strikers	H	3–2	Best (2), Hukic
July 25, 1981	Los Angeles Aztecs	A	0–3	
August 1, 1981	Portland Timbers	H	1–1*	Best
August 5, 1981	San Diego Sockers	A	0–3	
August 8, 1981	Seattle Sounders	H	3–0	Crescitelli, Licinar (2)
August 12, 1981	California Surf	H	2–1	Horvath, Licinar
August 15, 1981	San Diego Sockers	H	2–3	Lindsay, Best
August 19, 1981	Vancouver Whitecaps	A	1–3	Lindsay

* = Shootout

==== Standings ====
Western Division	W	L	GF	GA	PT
San Diego Sockers	21	11	67	49	173
Los Angeles Aztecs	19	13	53	55	160
California Surf	11	21	60	77	117
San Jose Earthquakes	11	21	44	78	108
