= 1984–85 Minnesota Strikers season =

Minnesota Strikers
1984–85 season
- Owner: Elizabeth Robbie
- Manager: Alan Merrick
- Stadium: Met Center
- MISL: Eastern Division: Fourth place Division Finalist
- Top goalscorer: League: Steve Zungul (68 goals); All: Steve Zungul (68 goals)
Home colors	Away colors

The 1984–85 Minnesota Strikers season of the Major Indoor Soccer League was the first season of the new team in the indoor league, and part of the club's eighteenth season in professional soccer. Previously, the club fielded an outdoor team in the North American Soccer League. This year, the team finished fourth in the Eastern Division of the regular season.

They made it to the playoffs and were a Division Finalist, losing to the San Diego Sockers.

== Competitions ==
=== MISL regular season ===
Playoff teams in bold.

Eastern Division	W	L	Pct.	GB	GF	GA	Home	Road
**Baltimore Blast**	32	16	.667	--	252	190	19-5	13-11
**Chicago Sting**	28	20	.583	4	261	223	20-4	8-16
**Cleveland Force**	27	21	.563	5	239	228	15-9	12-12
**Minnesota Strikers**	24	24	.500	8	224	226	16-8	8-16
**St. Louis Steamers**	24	24	.500	8	211	207	16-8	8-16
Pittsburgh Spirit	19	29	.396	13	217	256	16-8	3-21
New York Cosmos	11	22	.333	13½	137	285	7-9	4-13

Western Division	W	L	Pct.	GB	GF	GA	Home	Road
**San Diego Sockers**	37	11	.771	--	302	201	18-6	19-5
**Las Vegas Americans**	30	18	.625	7	269	214	18-6	12-12
**Los Angeles Lazers**	24	24	.500	13	232	230	14-10	10-14
**Kansas City Comets**	22	26	.458	15	216	221	13-11	9-15
**Wichita Wings**	21	26	.437	15½	202	233	14-10	7-16
Tacoma Stars	17	31	.354	20	207	263	11-13	6-18
Dallas Sidekicks	12	36	.333	25	194	286	8-16	4-20

=== MISL Playoffs ===
Wildcard Series
WC2	St. Louis Steamers	1
WC3	Kansas City Comets	2
WC1	Minnesota Strikers	2
WC4	Wichita Wings	1

Division Semifinals
1	San Diego Sockers	3
8	Kansas City Comets	0
3	Las Vegas Americans	1
6	Minnesota Strikers	3
2	Baltimore Blast	3
7	Los Angeles Lazers	0
4	Chicago Sting	2
5	Cleveland Force	3

Division Finals
1	San Diego Sockers	3
6	Minnesota Strikers	2
2	Baltimore Blast	3
5	Cleveland Force	2

Championship Series
1	San Diego Sockers	4
2	Baltimore Blast	1

=== Wildcard Series ===
Minnesota vs. Wichita
Date	Away	Home	Attendance
April 17	Wichita 1	**Minnesota 2**	4,233
April 19	Minnesota 3	**Wichita 8**	7,053
April 21	Wichita 2	**Minnesota 3**	4,032
	Jan Goossens scored at 2:45 of overtime
**Minnesota wins series 2-1**

St. Louis vs. Kansas City
Date	Away	Home	Attendance
April 17	**Kansas City 5**	St. Louis 4	7,636
	Damir Haramina scored at 8:14 of overtime
April 19	St. Louis 3	**Kansas City 2**	10,241
	Tasso Koutsoukos scored at 1:22 of overtime
**Kansas City wins series 2-0**

==== Quarterfinals ====
San Diego vs. Kansas City
Date	Away	Home	Attendance
April 24	Kansas City 3	**San Diego 4**	7,552
	Brian Quinn scored at 11:45 of overtime
April 26	Kansas City 7	**San Diego 11**	9,560
April 28	**San Diego 3**	Kansas City 2	10,458
**San Diego wins series 3-0**

Chicago vs. Cleveland
Date	Away	Home	Attendance
April 19	**Cleveland 5**	Chicago 4	6,550
	Peter Ward scored at 10:31 of overtime
April 21	Cleveland 4	**Chicago 8**	5,005
April 24	Chicago 1	**Cleveland 6**	8,112
April 27	Chicago 4	**Cleveland 5**	11,248
	Keith Furphy scored at 5:01 of overtime
**Cleveland wins series 3-1**

Baltimore vs. Los Angeles
Date	Away	Home	Attendance
April 24	Los Angeles 3	**Baltimore 4**	7,108
April 26	Los Angeles 3	**Baltimore 11**	9,493
April 28	**Baltimore 5**	Los Angeles 4	4,746
**Baltimore wins series 3-0**

Las Vegas vs. Minnesota
Date	Away	Home	Attendance
April 24	**Minnesota 6**	Las Vegas 5	5,278
April 26	Minnesota 4	**Las Vegas 6**	6,016
April 28	Las Vegas 2	**Minnesota 3**	7,134
May 1	Las Vegas 1	**Minnesota 4**	5,094
**Minnesota wins series 3-1**

==== Semifinals ====
San Diego vs. Minnesota
Date	Away	Home	Attendance
May 5	Minnesota 1	**San Diego 8**	8,494
May 8	Minnesota 5	**San Diego 6**	10,143
	Jean Willrich scored at 1:15 of overtime
May 10	San Diego 5	**Minnesota 8**	8,270
May 12	San Diego 3	**Minnesota 3**	7,871
	Minnesota wins shootout 3-2**
May 14	Minnesota 0	**San Diego 7**	10,059
**San Diego wins series 3-2**

Baltimore vs. Cleveland
Date	Away	Home	Attendance
May 3	Cleveland 5	**Baltimore 6**	7,568
May 5	**Cleveland 5**	Baltimore 3	8,205
May 10	Baltimore 3	**Cleveland 4**	13,093
May 11	**Baltimore 7**	Cleveland 6	13,861
May 14	Cleveland 4	**Baltimore 7**	9,184
**Baltimore wins series 3-2**

**San Diego won the shootout 4-3, but Minnesota appealed the result, as the Sockers used an ineligible player. The Strikers were declared winners on May 13.
