= 1987–88 Minnesota Strikers season =

Minnesota Strikers
1987–88 season
- Owner: (United States) Elizabeth Robbie
- Manager: (United States) Alan Merrick
- Stadium: Met Center
- MISL: Eastern Division: First place Semifinalist
- Top goalscorer: Erik Rasmussen
Home colors	Away colors

The 1987–88 Minnesota Strikers season, of the Major Indoor Soccer League, was the fourth season of the team in the indoor league, and the club's twenty-first season in professional soccer. This year, the team finished first in the Eastern Division of the regular season.

They made it to the playoffs and were a semifinalist, losing to the Cleveland Force. This was the last year of the team as the club folded it and moved back to Fort Lauderdale. There, the club fielded a new outdoor team named the Fort Lauderdale Strikers for the 1988 season of the new American Soccer League.

== Competitions ==
=== MISL regular season ===
Playoff teams in bold.

Eastern Division	W	L	Pct.	GB	GF	GA	Home	Road
**Minnesota Strikers**	31	25	.554	-	274	252		
**Cleveland Force**	30	26	.536	1	242	219		
**Dallas Sidekicks**	28	28	.500	3	200	204		
**Baltimore Blast**	25	31	.446	6	235	249		
Chicago Sting	24	32	.429	7	227	247		

Western Division	W	L	Pct.	GB	GF	GA	Home	Road
**San Diego Sockers**	42	14	.750	-	277	189		
**Los Angeles Lazers**	31	25	.554	11	291	266		
**Kansas City Comets**	29	27	.518	13	294	290		
**Tacoma Stars**	27	29	.482	15	259	285		
Wichita Wings	23	33	.411	19	232	261		
St. Louis Steamers	18	38	.321	24	214	280		

=== MISL Playoffs ===
- QUARTER-FINALS:
  - Minnesota defeated Baltimore, 5-3, 4-2, 1-5, 9-4
  - Cleveland defeated Dallas, 3-2, 3-6, 5-4 (2OT), 5-2
  - Kansas City defeated Los Angeles, 9-6, 4-2, 7-5
  - San Diego defeated Tacoma, 6-2, 3-4 (OT), 7-2, 7-6
- SEMI-FINALS:
  - Cleveland defeated Minnesota, 7-3, 0-7, 5-4, 5-2, 7-2
  - San Diego defeated Kansas City, 4-5, 5-4, 6-7 (OT), 3-7, 7-1, 6-1, 8-5
