= 1985–86 Minnesota Strikers season =

Minnesota Strikers
1985–86 season
- Owner: (United States) Elizabeth Robbie
- Manager: (United States) Alan Merrick
- Stadium: Met Center
- MISL: Eastern Division: Second place MISL Championship:Finalist
- Top goalscorer: League: (Socialist Federal Republic of Yugoslavia) Steve Zungul (55 goals); All: (Socialist Federal Republic of Yugoslavia) Steve Zungul (55 goals)
Home colors	Away colors

The 1985–86 Minnesota Strikers season of the Major Indoor Soccer League was the second season of the team in the indoor league, and the club's nineteenth season in professional soccer. This year, the team finished second in the Eastern Division of the regular season.

They made it to the playoffs and the MISL Championship Series, where they were defeated by the San Diego Sockers.

== Competitions ==
=== MISL regular season ===
Playoff teams in bold.

Eastern Division	W	L	Pct.	GB	GF	GA	Home	Road
**Cleveland Force**	27	21	.563	--	252	212	15-9	12-12
**Minnesota Strikers**	26	22	.542	1	232	242	16-8	10-14
**Dallas Sidekicks**	25	23	.521	2	220	231	16-8	9-15
**Baltimore Blast**	24	24	.500	3	211	201	17-7	7-17
Chicago Sting	23	25	.479	4	196	196	14-10	9-15
Pittsburgh Spirit	23	25	.479	4	221	237	18-6	5-19

Western Division	W	L	Pct.	GB	GF	GA	Home	Road
**San Diego Sockers**	36	12	.750	--	308	195	21-3	15-9
**Wichita Wings**	27	21	.563	9	252	212	15-9	12-12
**Tacoma Stars**	23	25	.479	13	208	232	15-9	8-16
**St. Louis Steamers**	23	25	.479	13	223	233	16-8	7-17
Kansas City Comets	18	30	.375	18	217	268	12-12	6-18
Los Angeles Lazers	13	35	.271	23	197	270	9-15	4-20

=== MISL Playoffs ===
Division Semifinals
E1	Cleveland Force	3
E4	Baltimore Blast	2
E2	Minnesota Strikers	3
E3	Dallas Sidekicks	1
W1	San Diego Sockers	3
W4	St. Louis Steamers	1
W2	Wichita Wings	1
W3	Tacoma Stars	3

Division Finals
E1	Cleveland Force	1
E2	Minnesota Strikers	3
W1	San Diego Sockers	3
W3	Tacoma Stars	1

Championship Series
E2	Minnesota Strikers	3
W1	San Diego Sockers	4

==== Quarterfinals ====
Cleveland vs. Baltimore
Date	Away	Home	Attendance
April 8	Baltimore 2	**Cleveland 7**	8,666
April 13	**Baltimore 8**	Cleveland 3	19,468
April 15	Cleveland 6	**Baltimore 8**	7,631
April 18	**Cleveland 4**	Baltimore 3	12,232
	Kai Haaskivi scored at 3:21 of overtime
April 20	Baltimore 1	**Cleveland 5**	16,626
**Cleveland wins series 3-2**

Minnesota vs. Dallas
Date	Away	Home	Attendance
April 12	Dallas 3	**Minnesota 5**	7,101
April 13	Dallas 2	**Minnesota 7**	5,151
April 16	Minnesota 3	**Dallas 4**	10,218
April 19	**Minnesota 7**	Dallas 4	13,908
**Minnesota wins series 3-1**

San Diego vs. St. Louis
Date	Away	Home	Attendance
April 10	St. Louis 6	**San Diego 7**	7,506
	Gary Collier scored at 11:31 of overtime
April 12	St. Louis 3	**San Diego 5**	10,123
April 16	San Diego 7	**St. Louis 8**	7,506
April 19	**San Diego 10**	St. Louis 4	9,464
**San Diego wins series 3-1**

Wichita vs. Tacoma
Date	Away	Home	Attendance
April 9	Tacoma 5	**Wichita 6**	7,382
April 12	**Tacoma 5**	Wichita 4	9,561
April 16	Wichita 4	**Tacoma 5**	14,162
	Fran O'Brien scored at 8:02 of overtime
April 18	Wichita 1	**Tacoma 3**	17,094
**Tacoma wins series 3-1**

==== Semifinals ====
Cleveland vs. Minnesota
Date	Away	Home	Attendance
April 25	Minnesota 2	**Cleveland 5**	18,797
April 27	**Minnesota 6**	Cleveland 2	16,877
May 2	Cleveland 5	**Minnesota 6**	10,254
	Thompson Usiyan scored at 2:08 of overtime
May 4	Cleveland 3	**Minnesota 7**	10,351
**Minnesota wins series 3-1**

San Diego vs. Tacoma
Date	Away	Home	Attendance
April 23	Tacoma 4	**San Diego 10**	8,308
April 29	Tacoma 2	**San Diego 7**	9,432
May 1	San Diego 3	**Tacoma 4**	15,290
May 7	**San Diego 8**	Tacoma 5	19,476
**San Diego wins series 3-1**

==== Championship Series ====
San Diego vs. Minnesota
Date	Away	Home	Attendance
May 9	Minnesota 2	**San Diego 7**	10,370
May 11	**Minnesota 6**	San Diego 1	9,172
May 16	San Diego 2	**Minnesota 7**	15,756
May 18	San Diego 3	**Minnesota 4**	15,849
May 21	Minnesota 4	**San Diego 7**	10,613
May 23	**San Diego 6**	Minnesota 3	15,944
May 26	Minnesota 3	**San Diego 5**	10,613
**San Diego wins series 4-3**
