= 1986–87 Minnesota Strikers season =

Minnesota Strikers
1986–87 season
- Owner: (United States) Elizabeth Robbie
- Manager: (United States) Alan Merrick
- Stadium: Met Center
- MISL: Eastern Division: Fourth place Division Semifinalist
- Top goalscorer: League: Tatu (22 goals); All: Tatu (22 goals)
Home colors	Away colors

The 1986–87 Minnesota Strikers season of the Major Indoor Soccer League was the third season of the team in the indoor league, and the club's twentieth season in professional soccer. This year, the team finished fourth in the Eastern Division of the regular season. They made it to the playoffs and were a Division Semifinalist.

== Competitions ==
=== MISL regular season ===
Playoff teams in bold.

Eastern Division	W	L	Pct.	GB	GF	GA	Home	Road
**Cleveland Force**	34	18	.654	--	252	218	20-6	14-12
**Baltimore Blast**	33	19	.635	1	239	201	20-6	13-13
**Dallas Sidekicks**	28	24	.538	6	209	197	15-11	13-13
**Minnesota Strikers**	26	26	.500	8	205	198	14-12	12-14
Chicago Sting	23	29	.442	11	263	265	15-11	8-18
New York Express	3	23	.115	18	97	159	2-11	1-12

Western Division	W	L	Pct.	GB	GF	GA	Home	Road
**Tacoma Stars**	35	17	.673	--	249	211	17-9	18-8
**Kansas City Comets**	28	24	.538	7	271	253	18-8	10-16
**San Diego Sockers**	27	25	.519	8	214	200	16-10	11-15
**Wichita Wings**	27	25	.519	8	268	265	18-8	9-17
St. Louis Steamers	19	33	.365	16	195	224	13-13	6-20
Los Angeles Lazers	16	36	.308	19	183	254	12-14	4-22

=== MISL Playoffs ===
Division Semifinals
E1	Cleveland Force	3
E4	Minnesota Strikers	2
E2	Baltimore Blast	2
E3	Dallas Sidekicks	3
W1	Tacoma Stars	3
W4	Wichita Wings	2
W2	Kansas City Comets	2
W3	San Diego Sockers	3

Division Finals
E1	Cleveland Force	1
E3	Dallas Sidekicks	4
W1	Tacoma Stars	4
W3	San Diego Sockers	3

Championship Series
E3	Dallas Sidekicks	4
W1	Tacoma Stars	3

==== Division Semifinals ====
Cleveland vs. Minnesota
Date	Away	Home	Attendance
May 9	**Minnesota 5**	Cleveland 4	11,461
	Hector Marinaro scored at 2:07 of overtime
May 10	Minnesota 6	**Cleveland 7**	7,165
May 13	**Cleveland 6**	Minnesota 5	5,766
	Michael King scored at 12:55 of overtime
May 16	Cleveland 4	**Minnesota 5**	6,888
May 19	Minnesota 3	**Cleveland 7**	11,808
**Cleveland wins series 3-2**

Baltimore vs. Dallas
Date	Away	Home	Attendance
May 7	Dallas 2	**Baltimore 3**	6,224
May 9	**Dallas 7**	Baltimore 6	7,306
May 15	**Baltimore 3**	Dallas 2	9,182
	Andy Chapman scored at 1:54 of overtime
May 17	Baltimore 3	**Dallas 4**	5,149
	Tatu scored at 4:53 of overtime
May 19	**Dallas 7**	Baltimore 4	7,918
**Dallas wins series 3-2**

Tacoma vs. Wichita
Date	Away	Home	Attendance
May 6	Wichita 7	**Tacoma 9**	9,385
May 8	Wichita 1	**Tacoma 9**	11,842
May 10	Tacoma 3	**Wichita 10**	6,846
May 13	Tacoma 2	**Wichita 6**	9,023
May 14	Wichita 2	**Tacoma 4**	7,254
**Tacoma wins series 3-2**

Kansas City vs. San Diego
Date	Away	Home	Attendance
May 7	**San Diego 5**	Kansas City 4	8,141
	Waad Hirmez scored at 5:58 of overtime
May 10	San Diego 1	**Kansas City 5**	8,127
May 12	**Kansas City 9**	San Diego 7	7,685
May 17	Kansas City 2	**San Diego 5**	7,946
May 20	**San Diego 9**	Kansas City 5	11,136
**San Diego wins series 3-2**
