= Robert Meschbach =

Canadian-American soccer player (born 1959)

Personal information
- Date of birth: June 17, 1959 (age 67)
- Place of birth: Galt, Ontario, Canada
- Height: 5 ft 9 in (1.75 m)
- Position: Midfielder

Youth career
- 1977–1980: Indiana

Senior career*
Years	Team	Apps	(Gls)
1981–1983	Fort Lauderdale Strikers	64	(13)
1983	Fort Lauderdale Strikers (indoor)	5	(7)
1984	→ Minnesota Strikers	1	(0)
1984	Chicago Sting	18	(0)
1984–1985	Chicago Sting (indoor)	27	(15)
1985	New York Cosmos (indoor)	2	(1)
1985	Chicago Maroons		
1985	Chicago Sting (indoor)	3	(0)
1985–1986	Chicago Shoccers (indoor)		
- * Club domestic league appearances and goals

Robert Meschbach (born June 17, 1959) is a Canadian-American retired soccer player who played professionally as a midfielder in the North American Soccer League, Major Indoor Soccer League and American Indoor Soccer Association.

== High school ==
While born in Canada, Robert Meschbach was an All-American at Gordon Tech High School in Chicago, Illinois. In two seasons, he scored 105 goals. Seventy-one of those goals were scored in his final season, then a national record. Meschbach had trials with Rapid Vienna in the Austrian Bundesliga and Werder Bremen in the Bundesliga but turned down a contract offer in lieu of a scholarship at Indiana University.

== College career ==
At Indiana University, Meschbach became a 1st team All-American in 1980, and runner-up for the Hermann Award (the equivalent of the Heisman Trophy). Meschbach had 61 total goals while at IU, leading the nation in scoring his senior year with 27. During his tenure at IU, the team had a 76–9–4 record with two final four appearances. Meschbach scored a hat-trick in 8 minutes, 50 seconds against the Cincinnati Bearcats on October 8, 1980, an NCAA record until 1985.

== Professional career ==
In 1980, Meschbach was the first player drafted for the Chicago Horizon of the Major Indoor Soccer League. He also was a first-round draft pick in the North American Soccer League to the Fort Lauderdale Strikers and opted to play for the Strikers. With the Strikers, Meschbach won Ft. Lauderdale Rookie of the Year honors, was voted NASL player of the week, and was considered one of the top Americans in the NASL. Robert's childhood idol was Gerd Müller, who also played for the Fort Lauderdale Strikers. In 1984, Meschbach began the season with the Strikers but was traded to the Chicago Sting in exchange for John McGrane on May 7, 1984. He helped them win the 1984 NASL Championship. When the NASL collapsed at the end of the 1984 season, the Sting moved to the Major Indoor Soccer League. Meschbach began the season with the Sting, but was traded to the New York Cosmos in exchange for Dan Canter an undisclosed amount of cash on February 15, 1985. Meschbach played two games for the Cosmos before they folded midway through the season. During the summer of 1985, he played for the Chicago Maroons in the National Soccer League of Chicago. On October 24, 1985, Meschbach rejoined the Sting as a free agent. The Sting released him a month later. Meschbach later sued the Sting for severance pay while playing for the Chicago Shoccers of the American Indoor Soccer Association. On March 1, 1986, he signed a ten-day contract with the San Diego Sockers but the deal fell through when he didn't clear waivers from the AISA before the trade deadline. In 2006, Meschbach was invited to play for the American Team in the North American Soccer League Reunion game in Dallas.

== Coaching career ==
While in college, Meschbach began coaching at the IU Soccer Camps. Meschbach also coached boys Varsity at Plantation High School in 1982 while playing for the Strikers. He coached girls Varsity at St. Viator High School, where the Lions won back-to-back IHSA State Championships in 2002 and 2003. Also coached boys at Carmel HS in Mundelein 2006. Additionally was an ODP evaluator for the state of Illinois in 2000 and 2001.

Meschbach has coached youth club teams professionally for the last ten years. He led Eclipse Select U16 teams to the USYSA National Championships in 2001 and 2003. While with the Eclipse in 2003, Meschbach initiated the Eclipse Select boys program. Later in 2003, he left the Eclipse to start FC United, and held the position of Director of Technical Development for the boys and girls programs. In 2006 FC United won the U23 men's USASA state cup and in 2008, he led FC United U18 boys to a USYSA Illinois State Championship, the club's first youth state cup. In the same year, he led the Ela Elite U23 men to a USASA National Championship and is currently coaching at Ela Elite.
