= Steve Kinsey =

English footballer (born 1963)

Personal information
- Full name: Stephen Kinsey
- Date of birth: 2 January 1963 (age 63)
- Place of birth: Manchester, England
- Positions: Forward; midfielder

Senior career*
Years	Team	Apps	(Gls)
1979–1986	Manchester City	101	(15)
1982	→ Chester (loan)	3	(1)
1982	→ Chesterfield (loan)	3	(0)
1986–1988	Minnesota Strikers (indoor)	99	(63)
1988–1989	Fort Lauderdale Strikers	?	(24)
1988–1989	Los Angeles Lazers (indoor)	19	(12)
1989–1990	Dallas Sidekicks (indoor)	43	(16)
1990	Miami Freedom		
1990–1991	Tacoma Stars (indoor)	48	(21)
1991	Tampa Bay Rowdies	5	(0)
1991	Rochdale	6	(1)
1991–1992	St Mirren	6	(0)
1992	Coleraine	1	(0)
1992	Fort Lauderdale Strikers	11	(7)
1993	Molde FK	4	(1)
1994	Radcliffe Borough	2	(2)
1994	Milwaukee Wave (indoor)		
1994–1995	Detroit Neon (indoor)	28	(39)
1996	Tampa Bay Terror (indoor)	14	(14)
1996	Richmond Kickers	16	(3)
1996–1997	Buffalo Blizzard (indoor)	15	(2)

International career
1980–1981	England Youth	5	(2)
1981	England U20	4	(0)
- * Club domestic league appearances and goals

Stephen Kinsey (born 2 January 1963) is an English former football forward who began his career in 1979 with Manchester City before moving to the United States in 1986. He then played professionally in the Major Indoor Soccer League, American Soccer League and others before retiring in 1997.

== Career ==
Kinsey played for Manchester City between 1979 and 1986. He played 101 times for the team in the Football League and scored 15 goals, including one at Wembley against Chelsea in the first Full Members' Cup Final, before transferring to Minnesota Strikers in the United States to play indoor football.

On 30 October 1986, the Minnesota Strikers of the Major Indoor Soccer League signed Kinsey. He came into the league after Alan Merrick, coach of the Strikers saw Kinsey playing in England during the summer of 1986. He was named the 1986–1987 Newcomer of the Year. At the completion of the 1988 MISL playoffs in May, Kinsey signed with the outdoor Fort Lauderdale Strikers of the American Soccer League. The Strikers went to the ASL championship game where they fell to the Washington Diplomats. However, Kinsey did not play as he had torn a groin muscle in the semi-finals. In late October 1988, Kinsey signed with the Los Angeles Lazers of MISL for the 1988–89 indoor season. The nagging groin injury limited Kinsey to nineteen games with the Lazers.

In March 1989, he signed with the Fort Lauderdale Strikers for the upcoming outdoor season. Leg injuries continued to hamper Kinsey, leading him to lose six regular season games. The Strikers would go on to win the league championship. When the Los Angeles Lazers folded during the summer, the Wichita Wings of MISL claimed Kinsey in the 12 July dispersal draft. After the Wings failed to tender an offer to Kinsey, he signed with the Dallas Sidekicks as a free agent. After the San Diego Sockers eliminated the Sidekicks from the playoffs, Kinsey signed with the Miami Freedom of the American Professional Soccer League.

In the fall of 1990, Kinsey again returned to the MISL, this time with the Tacoma Stars. On 7 June 1991, he signed with the Tampa Bay Rowdies of the APSL, but delayed joining the team as his wife was close to delivering a baby in Tacoma. In August 1991, the Rowdies released Kinsey after he failed to score in five games, then spent another seven on the bench. Kinsey then returned to the UK where he played for three teams in quick succession during the 1991–92 season: Rochdale, St Mirren and Coleraine.

In May 1992, Kinsey returned to the United States where he signed with the Fort Lauderdale Strikers. He rediscovered his scoring touch, bagging goal in his first game and totalling seven in eleven games.

Kinsey returned to Europe where he played for Molde FK in the Norwegian Premier League and Radcliffe Borough in the Northern Premier League.

In February 1994, Kinsey signed with the Milwaukee Wave of the National Professional Soccer League. Limits on foreign players prevented the Wave from fielding Kinsey, but he was available in the event of injuries to any other players. The team released him at the end of the season.

The Detroit Neon of the Continental Indoor Soccer League then drafted Kinsey in April 1994. He played two summer indoor seasons with the Neon. In January 1996, Kinsey signed with the Tampa Bay Terror of the National Professional Soccer League. In March 1996, he signed with the Richmond Kickers of the USISL. In the fall of 1997, Kinsey signed a series of 15-day contracts with the Buffalo Blizzard before signing for the remainder of the season in December 1997.

Kinsey has run a summer soccer camp for children in Florida. He splits his time between the US and the UK.

== Honours ==
Manchester City

- Full Members' Cup runner-up: 1985–86
