= Ben Collins (footballer, born 1961) =

Liberian footballer

Personal information
- Date of birth: June 12, 1961 (age 65)
- Place of birth: Monrovia, Liberia
- Height: 5 ft 8 in (1.73 m)
- Position: Midfielder

Youth career
- 1980–1981: Morrisville State College
- 1982–1983: FIU Golden Panthers

Senior career*
Years	Team	Apps	(Gls)
1984	Minnesota Strikers	1	(0)
1984–1985	Minnesota Strikers (indoor)	33	(13)
1985–1988	Chicago Sting (indoor)	139	(76)
1988–1989	Los Angeles Lazers (indoor)	30	(5)
1989	Orlando Lions		
1989–1992	San Diego Sockers (indoor)	80	(30)
- * Club domestic league appearances and goals

Ben Collins is a retired Liberian footballer who played as a midfielder in the North American Soccer League and Major Indoor Soccer League.

== College ==
In 1980, Collins began his collegiate soccer career with Morrisville State College in New York. In 1994, he was inducted into the National Junior College Athletic Hall of Fame. He was inducted into the Morrisville Athletic Hall of Fame in 1999. In 1982, he transferred to Florida International University where he was a 1982 NCAA Division II First Team All American soccer player. That year FIU won the NCAA Men's Division II Soccer Championship.

== Professional ==
On October 26, 1983, the Buffalo Stallions selected Collins in the fourth round (40th overall) of the 1983 Major Indoor Soccer League Draft. The Stallions cut him during the preseason. On July 27, 1984, the Minnesota Strikers of the North American Soccer League signed Collins on a 15-day contract to replace the injured Bruce Miller. While he played only one game for the Strikers during the outdoor season, he remained with the team when it moved to the MISL in the fall of 1984. He became a regular in the Minnesota midfield through two seasons. On November 15, 1985, the Strikers traded Collins, its 1986 first round and 1987 second round draft pick to the Chicago Sting in exchange for Dan Canter. Collins spent three seasons in Chicago. When the team folded following the 1987–1988 season, he signed with the Los Angeles Lazers as a free agent in August 1988. When the Lazers folded at the end of the season, the Wichita Wings selected Collins in the Dispersal Draft. That summer, he returned to outdoor soccer with the Orlando Lions of the American Soccer League. When the Wichita Wings failed to sign Collins, he became a free agent and signed with the San Diego Sockers. He was the 1991 MISL Championship MVP. He had suffered from knee injuries during his career including losing nearly half of his first season with the Sockers. During the 1991–1992 season, he reinjured his knee in February 1992. He eventually had knee surgery and retired at the end of the season.

== Yearly Awards ==
- MISL Championship Series Player of the Year – 1990–91
