= Tim Harris (soccer) =

American soccer player & coach (born 1961)

Current position
- Title: CEO and athletic director
- Team: UCLA
- Conference: Big Ten

Biographical details
- Born: December 21, 1961 (age 64); Torrance, California, U.S.

Playing career
- Position: Goalkeeper

Coaching career (HC unless noted)
- 1989: UCLA (assistant)

Administrative career (AD unless noted)
- 2026–present: UCLA
Association football career
Youth career
- 1980–1983: UCLA Bruins
Senior career*
Years	Team	Apps	(Gls)
1984–1987	Los Angeles Lazers (indoor)	63	(0)
1987–1988	Minnesota Strikers (indoor)	14	(0)
1989	California Kickers	16	(0)
Total		93	(0)
International career
1985	United States	1	(0)
- * Club domestic league appearances and goals

Tim Harris is a retired American soccer goalkeeper who spent four seasons in the Major Indoor Soccer League and one in the Western Soccer League. He also earned one cap with the U.S. national team. He was most recently the Senior Vice President of Business Operations for the Los Angeles Lakers basketball team and is currently the chief executive officer and athletic director for the UCLA Bruins.

== Player ==
=== College ===
Harris played four seasons of college soccer with UCLA from 1980 to 1983. He was a second-team All-American in 1983 and finished his career third on the school's career victories list with 48.

=== Professional ===
Drafted but not signed in 1984 by the San Diego Sockers, Harris signed with the Los Angeles Lazers of Major Indoor Soccer League (MISL). He played with the Lazers for three seasons before moving to the Minnesota Strikers. Significantly for his future career, Jerry Buss, owner of the Lazers also owned the Los Angeles Lakers of the National Basketball Association (NBA). Harris spent one season in Minnesota. In 1989, he played one season with the California Kickers of the Western Soccer League.

=== National team ===
Harris earned one cap with the U.S. national team. He replaced Arnie Mausser at halftime in a 5–0 loss to England on June 16, 1985. Harris played another eleven games with the U.S. B team. He represented the U.S. at the 1983 Pan American Games, playing in a 3–0 loss to Guatemala and a scoreless draw with Cuba.

== Coach ==
Harris spent at least the 1989 season as an assistant coach with UCLA. Brad Friedel stated in an interview that Harris was his all-time football hero, stating that he was the one who "started my journey".

== Post-soccer career ==
Following his retirement from playing professionally, Harris began working in commercial real estate. In this capacity, he joined the management team for the Great Western Forum, which served as the home court for the Los Angeles Lakers of the National Basketball Association. By 1993, he had risen to the position of Forum Sports vice president. He eventually jumped to the Lakers organization, becoming the president of business operations, chief marketing officer for the Lakers.

In 2026, Harris became the athletic director at UCLA.

== Personal life ==
He has three sons.
