= Kazbek Tambi =

American soccer player and coach

Personal information
- Date of birth: December 8, 1961 (age 64)
- Place of birth: Paterson, New Jersey, United States
- Position: Midfielder

Youth career
- 1979–1983: Columbia University

Senior career*
| Years | Team | Apps | (Gls) |
| 1983–1984 | New York Cosmos (indoor) | 5 | (0) |
| 1984 | New York Cosmos | 5 | (0) |
| 1984–1985 | New York Cosmos (indoor) | 24 | (4) |
| 1985–1986 | Minnesota Strikers (indoor) | 26 | (3) |
| 1986–1987 | New York Express (indoor) | 3 | (0) |
| 1988 | New Jersey Eagles | | |

Managerial career
- 1998–2006: Seton Hall men (assistant)
- 2002–2004: New Jersey Stallions Women
- 2005–: United States U16 women
- 2007–: Seton Hall women
- * Club domestic league appearances and goals

Kazbek Tambi is a retired American soccer midfielder who formerly coached both Seton Hall University women's soccer team and the United States U-17 women's soccer team. He spent two seasons in the North American Soccer League, four in the Major Indoor Soccer League and one in the American Soccer League. He was also a member of the U.S. Olympic soccer team at the 1984 Summer Olympics.

== Player ==
=== Youth ===
Tambi was born in Paterson, New Jersey and attended Ridgewood High School in Ridgewood, New Jersey, graduating in 1979. He is Karachay and his family was originally from the North Caucasus region of Karachayevo-Cherkessia, which they fled as refugees during World War II to Turkey before settling in Paterson. He was a four-year starter on the school's soccer team, earning All State his senior year. After graduating from high school, he attended Columbia University from 1979 to 1983 where he played on the men's soccer team. He was the team captain and was part of the team which reached the 1983 Final Four. He graduated from Columbia with a bachelor's degree in economics in 1983.

=== National team ===
In 1983, Tambi was the captain of the U.S. team at the 1983 Pan American games. In 1984, he was a member of the U.S. team at the 1984 Summer Olympics in Los Angeles. He was originally named as an alternate to the team, but earned a roster spot when Dan Canter was injured just before the tournament.

=== Professional ===
The New York Cosmos of the North American Soccer League drafted Tambi and he signed with the team on October 15, 1984. At the end of that season, the league folded and the Cosmos moved to the Major Indoor Soccer League. However, they were unable to complete the 1984–1985 MISL season before folding. On September 17, 1985, Tambi signed with the Minnesota Strikers of MISL. On September 5, 1986, the Strikers released Tambi. He then signed with the New York Express in November. The Express released him on January 3, 1987. Tambi began law school in 1987, but returned to soccer in the spring of 1988 when he signed with the New Jersey Eagles of the American Soccer League.

== Coach ==
Since retiring from playing professionally, Tambi has coached extensively at the club, collegiate, professional and national team levels. On the club level, Tambi has served as the head coach of Arsenal World Class. He has spent time with both girls and boys team associated with the club.

In 1998, Seton Hall University hired Tambi as an assistant coach to the men's soccer team. Tambi would remain in that position through the 2006 season. On January 25, 2007, Seton Hall announced Tambi would become the head coach of the women's soccer team. Tambi completed his law degree from Seton Hall in 1990. He practices law in addition to his coaching duties.

Tambi has also coached at the professional level, spending three seasons (2002–2005) with the defunct New Jersey Stallions women's team which competed in the W-League. In June 2005, the U.S. Soccer Federation hired Tambi as the coach for the U.S. U-16 girls national team.

In 2004, Ridgewood High School inducted Tambi into its Athletic Hall of Fame. Tambi has been a resident of Paramus, New Jersey.
