= Minnesota Kicks =

Defunct American soccer club

- Full name: Minnesota Kicks
- Nickname(s): Kicks
- Founded: January 1976
- Dissolved: December 1981; 43 years ago
- Stadium: Metropolitan Stadium; Met Center (indoor)
- Capacity: 45,000; 15,184 (indoor)
- League: North American Soccer League
Home colors	Away colors

The Minnesota Kicks was a professional soccer team that played at Metropolitan Stadium in the Minneapolis suburb of Bloomington, Minnesota, from 1976 to 1981. The team was a member of the now defunct North American Soccer League (NASL). Initially known as the Denver Dynamos, the team relocated and became the Minnesota Kicks in 1976. The Kicks quickly became one of the league's more popular teams, with an average attendance of 23,120 fans per game in 1976. The Kicks won their division four years in a row from 1976 to 1979. The Kicks drew over 23,000 fans in each season from 1976 to 1979, with attendance peaking at 32,775 in 1977.

== History ==
The team had relocated to Minnesota after having been based in Denver, Colorado, as the Denver Dynamos. A group of ten investors from Minnesota, led by Jack Crocker, bought the Denver team on November 25, 1975, and relocated to Minnesota. The name "Kicks" was selected by a name-the-team contest, and announced on January 28, 1976. Freddie Goodwin, who had previously coached the New York Generals, was named the first coach on February 19, 1976. Goodwin served also as team president starting in August 1976.

The team began the 1976 season slowly, however by the end of its first season the team had won the Western Division. During the season, the Kicks boosted their roster by signing Ade Coker from Boston. The Kicks also played Glasgow Rangers to a 2–2 draw in a friendly. Minnesota was a success with fans, averaging 23,117 per game, including 42,065 for its regular season finale, But it was a game with the New York Cosmos on June 9 that convinced that The Kicks have arrived. With Pelé playing for the Cosmos, the Cosmos beat the Kicks 2–1, but the Kicks set a new NASL record of 46,164 fans. The team was led by leading scorer Alan Willey with 16 goals. The 1976 playoffs included a 3–0 win over Seattle, followed by a 3–1 win over San Jose in front of a Kicks record of 49,576 fans, and finished with a 3–0 loss to the Toronto Metros-Croatia in the 1976 Soccer Bowl at Seattle's Kingdome in front of 25,000, with the winning goal scored by Portuguese legend Eusébio.

In 1977, the Kicks won the Western Division again, and averaged 32,775 fans, second only to the New York Cosmos. The Kicks were again led by Alan Willey with 14 goals, while midfielder Alan West was named to the All-Star team. The Kicks lost in the playoffs to Seattle.

In 1978 the Kicks won the Central Division, averaging 30,928 fans. The team's leading scorer was Alan Willey, with 21 goals. In the playoffs, the Kicks defeated Tulsa before losing to the New York Cosmos. After the 1978 season, Goodwin stepped down as coach.

Roy McCrohan was named coach December 1978, and he coached the team for the 1979 season. In 1979, the Kicks signed a major international star in defender Björn Nordqvist, Sweden's all-time caps leader. The Kicks won the Central Division again in 1979, but fell to Tulsa in the playoffs. Once again, Alan Willey led the team's scoring with 21 goals, and Ace Ntsoelengoe was named to the All-Star Team.

After nine games into 1980 season, McCrohan was removed, and Goodwin again became coach. The Kicks finished the regular season second behind the Dallas Tornado in the Central Division, and lost in the playoffs to Dallas. Ace Ntsoelengoe was the team's leading scorer with 13 goals and 17 assists.

Stars for the Kicks included US Soccer Hall of Famers Patrick (Ace) Ntsoelengoe and Alan Willey, the league's fifth and third league all-time leading scorers respectively. Ron Futcher, who along with Willey played all six Kicks seasons, went on to become the league's fourth all-time leading scorer.

The Kicks were the first team in the NASL to win 4 straight division titles (1976–79). The team reached the playoffs each of its six seasons, but usually lost in the early rounds. The Minnesota Kicks are remembered for the tailgating in the Metropolitan Stadium parking lot. It became a cultural phenomenon in the late 1970s, with thousands of fans arriving early to socialize and consume beverages.

=== Demise ===
The original ownership group sold the team on November 12, 1980, to a group led by Englishman Ralph Sweet, who replaced Goodwin as coach early in the 1981 season. Goodwin remained president of the team until June 1981. The Kicks finished the 1981 season second in the Central Division. Ron Futcher was the team's leading scorer with 14 goals. The Kicks defeated Tulsa in the playoffs, but lost to Ft. Lauderdale in the quarterfinals.

The Kicks' last season was 1981. The team's last regular-season game was August 19, 1981, a 2–1 home win at Met Stadium over the Dallas Tornado. The team's last game at the Met was August 26, 1981, a 1–0 shootout playoff victory against the Tulsa Roughnecks. The team's last game was played on September 6, 1981, a 3–0 home playoff loss to the Fort Lauderdale Strikers played at the University of Minnesota's Memorial Stadium due to a schedule conflict with the Minnesota Twins in front of only 10,722 fans. The team had planned to move to the Hubert H. Humphrey Metrodome for the 1982 season.

The Kicks lost $2.5 million during the 1981 season. By the end of the 1981 season, the Kicks were up for sale, the team missed a payment for its players and office staff, NASL Commissioner Phil Woosnam was trying to find a buyer for the club, and the NASL announced it would play the 1981–82 indoor season without Minnesota. The Kicks folded in December 1981. The NASL conducted a dispersal draft on December 7, 1981, in which five Kicks players were selected: Ace Ntsoelengoe by Toronto, Ron Futcher by Portland, Tino Lettieri by Vancouver, David Stride by Fort Lauderdale, Randy Phillips by Tulsa, and Tim Twellman by Tulsa.

== Year-by-year ==
=== NASL seasons ===
Season	Won	Lost	Points	Reg. season	Playoffs	Avg. Attend.
1976	15	9	138	1st, Pacific Conference, Western Division	Won Division Championship (Seattle); Won Conference Championship (San Jose); Lost Soccer Bowl '76 (Toronto)	23,121
1977	16	10	137	1st, Pacific Conference, Western Division	Lost Division Championship (Seattle)	32,775
1978	17	13	156	1st, National Conference, Central Division	Won 1st Round (Tulsa); Lost Conference Semifinal (Cosmos)	30,928
1979	21	9	184	1st, National Conference, Central Division	Lost Conference Quarterfinal (Tulsa)	24,580
1980	16	16	147	2nd, National Conference, Central Division	Lost 1st Round (Dallas)	18,279
1981	19	13	163	2nd, Central Division	Won 1st Round (Tulsa); Lost Quarterfinal (Ft. Lauderdale)	16,605

1976 Alan Willey, Ace Ntsoelengoe, Peter Brine, Alan Merrick (Captain), Ron Webster, Mike Flater, Chaka Ngcobo, Geoff Barnett, Sam Bick, Ron Futcher, Alan West, Doug Brooks, Smith Eggleston, Nick Owcharuk, Ade Coker, Tom Howe, Jeff Solem, Steve Litt, Frank Spraggon, Peter Short. Freddie Goodwin (Coach), Gary Smith (Trainer), Dave Nowicki (Ass't Trainer), Dr. James Priest (Team Physician).

1979 Willie Morgan, Gary Vogel, Tony Want, Alan Merrick, Ace Ntsoelengoe, Alan West, Chico Hamilton, Volkmar Gross, Mark Moran, Geoff Barnett, Bjorn Nordqvist (Captain), Alan Willey, Tino Lettieri, Ricardo Alonso, Steve Litt, Greg Villa, Brian Zins, Ron Futcher, Mike McLenaghan, Tim Twellman. Roy McCrohan (Head Coach), Gary Smith (Head Trainer), Jim Mulcahy (Ass't Trainer), Dr. James Priest (Team Physician), Freddie Goodwin (President).

=== NASL indoor ===
Minnesota participated in and finished as runners-up in the 1978 NASL Skelly Indoor Invitational. They played one other match that year against Tampa Bay. The NASL began playing a full schedule of indoor soccer in the fall of 1979. The Kicks played their home games at Met Center and participated for 2 seasons, before folding in November 1981, just a month before the start of the 1981–82 indoor season.

Season	Won	Lost	Points	Reg. season	Playoffs	Avg. Attend.
1978	1	2	—	NA	Runner-up Skelly Invitational (Tulsa)	no home games
1979–80	8	4	—	2nd, Western Division	Won 1st Round (Tulsa); Lost Semifinal (Memphis)	9,562
1980–81	12	6	—	2nd, Central Division	Lost 1st Round (Atlanta)	5,877

=== International Friendlies ===
Date	Visitor	Score	Host	Venue	Attendance
May 26, 1976	(Scotland) Glasgow Rangers	2–2	Minnesota Kicks	Met Stadium	11,328
July 19, 1977	(Sweden) Hammarby IF	2–1	Minnesota Kicks	Met Stadium	24,032
May 23, 1979	(England) Ipswich Town F.C.	1–0 (shoot out)	Minnesota Kicks	Met Stadium	14,960
March 23, 1981	Minnesota Kicks	2–1	(England) Crystal Palace F.C.	Selhurst Park	
March 25, 1981	Minnesota Kicks	2–1	(England) Luton Town F.C.	Kenilworth Road	
March 30, 1981	Minnesota Kicks	1–0	(England) Stoke City F.C.	Victoria Ground	

== Honors ==
NASL championships
- 1976 runner-up
- 1978 indoor runner-up

Conference Titles

- 1976 Pacific Conference

Division titles

- 1976 Western Division, Pacific Conference
- 1977 Western Division, Pacific Conference
- 1978 Central Division, National Conference
- 1979 Central Division, National Conference

U.S. Soccer Hall of Fame

- 2003 Ace Ntsoelengoe & Alan Willey

Canadian Soccer Hall of Fame

- 2001 Tino Lettieri
- 2008 Bruce Twamley
All-Star first team selections
- 1977 Alan West
- 1979 Ace Ntsoelengoe
- 1980 Ace Ntsoelengoe

All-Star second team selections

- 1976 Ron Webster & Alan West
- 1978 Alan Merrick

All-Star honorable mentions

- 1976 Frank Spraggon
- 1977 Steve Litt, Ace Ntsoelengoe & Alan Merrick
- 1978 Mike Renshaw
- 1979 Steve Litt

Indoor All-Stars

- 1980–81 Tino Lettieri, Björn Nordqvist

== Coaching statistics ==
#	Name	Term	Regular season				Playoffs				Overall			
#	Name	Term	Games	Won	Lost	Win%	Games	Won	Lost	Win%	Games	Won	Lost	Win%
1	Freddie Goodwin	1976–1978	80	48	32	.600	9	4	5	.444	89	52	37	.584
2	Roy McCrohan	1979–1980	39	23	16	.590	2	0	2	.000	41	23	18	.561
1	Freddie Goodwin	1980–1981	29	17	12	.586	2	0	2	.000	31	17	14	.548
3	Geoff Barnett	1981	26	16	10	.615	4	2	2	.500	30	18	12	.600
*	Total	1976–1981	174	104	70	.598	17	6	11	.353	191	110	81	.576

== Media coverage ==
=== Radio ===
- 1976 WWTC-AM 1280
- 1977 KSTP AM 1500
- 1978–79 WWTC-AM 1280
- 1980 KSTP-AM 1500
- 1981 WAYL AM 980

Frank Buetel was the original play-by-play announcer (1976–79), followed by Al Shaver in 1980 and Doug McLeod in 1981.

=== Television ===
- 1976–80 KSTP-TV
- 1981 WCCO-TV

KSTP's original announcers were Kicks' public address announcer Rod Trongard and Tom Ryther. When Ryther left KSTP in March 1978, Bob Bruce replaced him. Ralph Jon Fritz called Kicks' games on WCCO.

== Records ==
Records of the Minnesota Kicks are available for research use. They include manager's subject files (1976–1980), staff and player files, payrolls, marketing and promotional materials, financial files, and miscellaneous records. The bulk of the records are the files of team coach and manager Freddie Goodwin, and concern the general management of the franchise.

== See also ==
- Minnesota Strikers
- Minnesota Thunder
- Minnesota United FC (2010–16)
- Minnesota United FC
