= John McGrane =

Scottish-Canadian soccer player

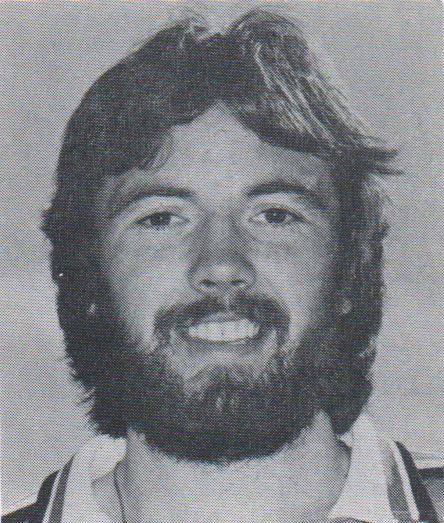
- McGrane in 1979

Personal information
- Date of birth: October 12, 1952 (age 74)
- Place of birth: Glasgow, Scotland
- Height: 1.78 m (5 ft 10 in)
- Position: Defender

College career
Years	Team	Apps	(Gls)
- Simon Fraser Clan

Senior career*
Years	Team	Apps	(Gls)
1975	Hamilton City		
1977–1981	Los Angeles Aztecs	133	(4)
1979–1980	Los Angeles Aztecs (indoor)	6	(0)
1981–1982	Montreal Manic (indoor)	13	(3)
1982–1983	Montreal Manic	57	(0)
1983–1984	Chicago Sting (indoor)	23	(3)
1984	Minnesota Strikers	17	(0)
1984–1985	Minnesota Strikers (indoor)	38	(0)

International career
1977–1981	Canada	12	(0)

Managerial career
- Kitchener Spirit
- Hamilton Steelers
- * Club domestic league appearances and goals

John McGrane (born October 12, 1952) is a Scottish-Canadian former soccer player who played as a defender.

Starting his career at Hamilton City, he went on to spend nine years playing in the North American Soccer League for the Los Angeles Aztecs, the Montreal Manic, the Chicago Sting, and the Minnesota Strikers. He retired from playing in 1985.

McGrane competed at the 1976 Summer Olympics and won 12 caps with the Canada national team.

== Early life ==
McGrane was born in Scotland and moved to Hamilton, Ontario aged 12.

== Club career ==
McGrane began playing semi-professional soccer aged 16. In 1974, he moved to British Columbia to study at Simon Fraser University and was named NAIA MVP in his freshman season. The following year, he was named a NAIC First Team All-American.

He began his professional career with National Soccer League club Hamilton City in 1975 and joined North American Soccer League side the Los Angeles Aztecs in 1977. He was named Rookie of the Year in his first campaign, and played six games for the club during the 1979–80 indoor season.

In 1981, McGrane joined the Montreal Manic and spent his first season playing indoor soccer. He later spent two years with the club competing in outdoor seasons. In 1983, he joined North American Soccer League team the Chicago Sting for the indoor season and moved to the Minnesota Strikers a year later. He played outdoor and indoor seasons for the club before retiring in 1985.

== International career ==
After being spotted playing at Simon Fraser University, McGrane represented Canada at the 1976 Summer Olympics in Montreal. He started both games as a forward as Canada finished bottom of Group G.

In October 1977, McGrane made his debut for the Canada national team as they suffered a 2–1 defeat to El Salvador in 1978 World Cup qualification. He made a further 11 international appearances for Canada, with his final coming in a 1–1 draw with Haiti in November 1981.

== Coaching career ==
In 1990, McGrane was named as coach of Canadian Soccer League expansion club Kitchener Spirit for their inaugural season, and set up a private coaching company alongside his assistant coach, John Gibson. The following year, he was named as head coach and general manager of league rivals the Hamilton Steelers, with Gibson following as his assistant.

== Personal life ==
McGrane was born in Scotland and moved to Hamilton, Ontario aged 12. He has four children.

In April 2008, McGrane was inducted into the Canada Soccer Hall of Fame for his services to the Canadian national team and support of Canadian soccer after retiring.
