= Dan Canter =

American soccer player (1961–2020)

Personal information
- Date of birth: November 16, 1961
- Place of birth: North Plainfield, New Jersey, U.S.
- Date of death: April 9, 2020 (aged 58)
- Place of death: Las Vegas, Nevada, U.S.
- Height: 6 ft 1 in (1.85 m)
- Position: Defender

Youth career
- 1978–1981: Penn State

Senior career*
Years	Team	Apps	(Gls)
1982	Fort Lauderdale Strikers	29	(2)
1983	Team America	30	(5)
1984	New York Cosmos	14	(0)
1984–1985	New York Cosmos (indoor)	27	(9)
1985	Chicago Sting (indoor)	19	(2)
1985–1987	Minnesota Strikers (indoor)	44	(5)
Total		163	(23)

International career
1983–1985	United States	9	(0)
- * Club domestic league appearances and goals

Dan Canter (November 16, 1961 – April 9, 2020) was a U.S. soccer defender. He played three seasons in the North American Soccer League and three in Major Indoor Soccer League. He also earned nine caps with the U.S. national team, scoring two goals, between 1983 and 1985.

Born in North Plainfield, New Jersey, Canter was raised in Chatham Township, New Jersey.

== College ==
Canter attended Penn State where he played as a sweeper on the men's soccer team from 1978 to 1981. In 1981, he earned first team All American honors.

== Professional ==
The Fort Lauderdale Strikers of the North American Soccer League drafted Canter in the 1982 NASL College Draft. He quickly won a starting job on the Striker's first team, playing twenty-nine games and scoring twice. In 1983, the U.S. Soccer Federation, in coordination with the NASL, entered the U.S. national team, known as Team America, into the NASL as a league franchise. The team drew on U.S. citizens playing in the NASL, Major Indoor Soccer League and American Soccer League. In January 1983, Canter left the Strikers and signed with Team America. When Team America finished the 1983 season with a 10–20 record, the worst in the NASL, USSF withdrew the team from the league. Canter returned to the Strikers in time for the 1983-1984 NASL indoor season. The Strikers which were in the process of relocating from Fort Lauderdale to Minnesota, did not play in that season. Therefore, the Strikers loaned Canter to the New York Cosmos. On February 28, 1984, the Strikers traded Canter to the Cosmos in exchange for Mike Jeffries, a 1985 first-round draft pick and cash. That year Canter was an NASL All Star honorable mention (third team). The NASL collapsed after the 1984 outdoor season and several of the league's teams, including the Cosmos, moved to MISL for the 1984–1985 season. Canter began the season with the Cosmos, but financial difficulties led the Cosmos to trade him to the Chicago Sting in exchange for Robert Meschbach and cash in February 1985. On November 15, 1985, the Sting traded Canter to the Minnesota Strikers in exchange for Ben Collins and two draft picks.

== National team ==
Canter earned his first cap in the national team's only 1983 game, a 2–0 win over Haiti. Canter played the first national team game in 1984, a 0–0 tie with Italy and was an integral part of the team as it prepared for the upcoming 1984 Summer Olympics in Los Angeles. Unfortunately for him, he injured himself just prior to the games and was replaced by Kazbek Tambi on the roster. Canter returned for the next two full internationals in September and October, but did not play again until May 1985. At that point, he again became a regular starter as the U.S. moved through the 1986 FIFA World Cup qualification rounds. He was part of the debacle in Torrance, California where the U.S. needed only a tie with Costa Rica to advance, but lost 1–0. He earned his last cap three weeks later when England crushed the U.S. 5–0 in Los Angeles.

== Post Soccer ==
Upon leaving the life of soccer, Canter became a salesperson for Rick Case Automotive Group before moving into management. After 19 years with Rick Case. He is currently New Car Sales Manager at Lauderdale Infiniti.

== Death ==
Dan Canter died on April 9, 2020, in Las Vegas, Nevada, though it was not announced until April 17.
