= Godfrey Ingram =

English footballer (born 1959)

Personal information
- Full name: Godfrey Patrick Ingram
- Date of birth: 26 October 1959 (age 67)
- Place of birth: Luton, England
- Position: Striker

Youth career
- 1975–1977: Luton Town

Senior career*
Years	Team	Apps	(Gls)
1977–1982	Luton Town	27	(6)
1979	→ New York Cosmos (loan)	1	(0)
1980	→ Northampton Town (loan)	10	(4)
1982	San Jose Earthquakes	31	(17)
1982–1983	Golden Bay Earthquakes (indoor)	38	(34)
1982–1983	Cardiff City	11	(2)
1983–1984	Golden Bay Earthquakes	35	(18)
1983–1984	Golden Bay Earthquakes (indoor)	32	(38)
1984	Minnesota Strikers	12	(2)
1984–1985	Las Vegas Americans (indoor)	23	(10)
1985–1986	Pittsburgh Spirit (indoor)	48	(26)
1986–1987	Tacoma Stars (indoor)	59	(59)
1987–1988	St. Louis Steamers (indoor)		(3)
1988	Dallas Sidekicks (indoor)	39	(32)
1988–1989	Tacoma Stars (indoor)	42	(32)
1989–1992	St. Louis Storm (indoor)	95	(65)
1992	Peterborough United	1	(0)
- St Albans City
- Buckingham Town
Total		44	(276)

International career
1975	England Schoolboys	8	(5)
1977	England Youth	2	(2)
- * Club domestic league appearances and goals

Godfrey Patrick Ingram (born 26 October 1959) is an English retired professional footballer who played as a striker. Active in England, Wales and the United States, Ingram made over 440 career league appearances, and scored over 270 league goals.

== Career ==
Born in Luton, Ingram began his career with the youth team of home town club Luton Town. He turned professional with Luton Town in 1977, and spent loan spells with the New York Cosmos and Northampton Town. After leaving Luton Town in 1982, Ingram returned to the North American Soccer League to play with the San Jose Earthquakes before returning to the UK to play with Welsh side Cardiff City. Ingram then returned to play for the rebranded Golden Bay Earthquakes during the 1982–1983 Major Indoor Soccer League season. He remained with the Earthquakes for the 1983 outdoor and 1983–1984 NASL indoor seasons. He then began the 1984 outdoor season with the 'Quakes before being traded to the Minnesota Strikers in May 1984. The NASL collapsed after the 1984 season, and Ingram signed with the Las Vegas Americans of the MISL. When the Americans folded at the end of the season, coach Don Popovic, along with several Las Vegas players including Ingram, moved to the Pittsburgh Spirit. The Spirit folded at the end of the season and the Tacoma Stars picked up his contract in July 1986. He began the 1987–1988 season with the Stars, but demanded to be traded after seeing a reduction in his playing time. On 4 December 1987, the Stars sent him to the St. Louis Steamers in exchange for Charlie Falzon and $20,000. He played eight games for the St. Louis Steamers before moving to the Dallas Sidekicks on 11 January 1988 for $75,000 and the Sidekicks second and third round draft picks. He finished the season in Dallas, began the 1988–1989 season and was released by the Sidekicks on 19 November 1988. Two days later, the Tacoma Stars picked him off waivers. The Stars released him on 5 July 1989 in a move to reduce the team salary. On 18 October 1989, he joined the St. Louis Storm and played three seasons with them. Ingram returned to England in 1992, playing league football with Peterborough United, and non-league football with St Albans City and Buckingham Town. He retired in 2001.
