= Dwight Lodeweges =

Dutch football player and manager

Personal information
- Full name: Dwight Lodeweges
- Date of birth: 26 October 1957 (age 69)
- Place of birth: Turner Valley, Alberta, Canada
- Position: Defender

Youth career
- 1975: V.V.O.P.

Senior career*
Years	Team	Apps	(Gls)
1975–1979	Go Ahead Eagles		
1979–1982	Edmonton Drillers	96	(10)
1982–1983	Go Ahead Eagles	17	(0)
1983	Montreal Manic	29	(1)
1984–1988	Minnesota Strikers (indoor)	130	(29)
1988–1989	Go Ahead Eagles	32	(0)
1990–1992	Go Ahead Eagles	1	(0)
Total		305	(40)

International career
1978	Netherlands U-21	6	(0)

Managerial career
- 1989–1990: Go Ahead Eagles (Youth Head Coach)
- 1990–1995: Go Ahead Eagles (assistant coach)
- 1995–1998: VVOG
- 1998–2001: FC Zwolle
- 2001: FC Groningen
- 2002: Groningen II
- 2003: FC Groningen (assistant)
- 2003–2004: SC Heerenveen (assistant)
- 2004–2005: Al-Jazira (assistant)
- 2006–2007: Nagoya Grampus (assistant)
- 2007–2008: PSV U-19 (assistant)
- 2008–2009: PSV (assistant)
- 2009: PSV
- 2009: NEC
- 2010: FC Edmonton
- 2011: JEF United
- 2013–2014: Cambuur
- 2014–2015: Heerenveen
- 2017–2018: PEC Zwolle (assistant)
- 2018–: Netherlands (assistant)
- 2020: Netherlands (caretaker)
- * Club domestic league appearances and goals

Dwight Lodeweges (born 26 October 1957) is a Canadian–born Dutch football coach and former professional player. He is currently one of the assistant managers of the Netherlands national team. In 2020, after Ronald Koeman left to join Barcelona, he was appointed as caretaker manager for two matches. On 29 June 2021, Frank de Boer resigned as coach and Lodeweges again took over on an interim basis until a new head coach was appointed.

== Managerial career ==
After the resignation of Huub Stevens, Lodeweges was named PSV Eindhoven's head coach. He finished the season, but then left to become head coach of NEC, On 9 April 2009, he signed on for two years but was dismissed from the role of manager at NEC after the defeat 4–0 of Sunday, against PSV Eindhoven.

On 9 March 2010, he was named as the new head coach of FC Edmonton. He left the club before its first competitive match and signed on to coach JEF United of J2 League on 3 December 2010.

In 2013, he signed with Cambuur in the Dutch premier division. He left mid-season in 2014 when it became known he had signed with their arch-rivals Heerenveen for the next season. With Heerenveen, he finished seventh in the 2014–15 season. The start of the 2015–16 season was bad, with Heerenveen at the bottom of the table. In October 2015, he was replaced.

== Managerial statistics ==
Team	Year(s)	Record				
Team	Year(s)	G	W	D	L	Win %
JEF United	2011	30	14	8	8	46.67
Netherlands (caretaker)	2020	2	1	0	1	50.00
Total		32	15	8	9	46.88
