= 1984–85 Major Indoor Soccer League season =

Major Indoor Soccer League
- Season: 1984–85
- Champions: San Diego Sockers (2nd title)
- Matches: 328
- Goals: 3,163 (9.64 per match)
- Top goalscorer: (Socialist Federal Republic of Yugoslavia) Steve Zungul (68 goals)
- Average attendance: 8,599

The 1984–85 Major Indoor Soccer League season was the seventh in league history and ended with the San Diego Sockers winning their second MISL title in three seasons over the Baltimore Blast. It was the Sockers' fourth straight indoor title, as they had also won the North American Soccer League's indoor league in the spring of 1984.

== Recap ==
With the NASL near death in the summer of 1984, a handful of teams made plans to switch from outdoor to indoor soccer once the NASL season ended in October. Along with the Sockers, the Chicago Sting, Minnesota Strikers and New York Cosmos formally made the leap in late August. With the addition of the Dallas Sidekicks, the league went back to a 14-team, two-division setup.

With an influx of new teams, the league expanded the playoffs even further. 10 teams would qualify, the top three in each division and the next best four wild-card teams. The wild-card teams would play a best-of-three series. The second and third round were best-of-five series, and the championship round would be a best-of-seven series. Each successive round would see the winners reseeded, similar to the NHL playoff format used for almost 20 years.

While the Sting and Strikers made the playoffs, the Cosmos struggled. On February 22, with their record at 11-22, the team announced they were pulling out of the MISL effective immediately. The league would scramble to fill out the schedule, but only the Wichita Wings would play an uneven number of games.

The Strikers would make a run from the wildcard series to the league semifinals, only falling to San Diego in a decisive fifth game. Trailing in the series two games to one, Minnesota actually lost the fourth game in a shootout, but lodged a protest with commissioner Francis Dale over San Diego's shooting order. Dale upheld the protest and declared the Strikers winners. Despite the Sockers only being made aware of the fifth game once they landed at the San Diego airport, they shut out Minnesota to win the series

This would be the final year the MISL would have games aired on network television, CBS broadcast Game 4 of the championship series live on May 25.

Despite having the league's third-best record, the Las Vegas Americans would be terminated by the league after the season due to financial difficulties.

== Teams ==
Team	City/Area	Arena
Baltimore Blast	Baltimore	Baltimore Arena
Chicago Sting	Chicago	Chicago Stadium
Cleveland Force	Cleveland	Richfield Coliseum
Dallas Sidekicks	Dallas	Reunion Arena
Kansas City Comets	Kansas City, Missouri	Kemper Arena
Las Vegas Americans	Paradise, Nevada	Thomas & Mack Center
Los Angeles Lazers	Inglewood, California	The Forum
Minnesota Strikers	Bloomington, Minnesota	Met Center
New York Cosmos	East Rutherford, New Jersey	Brendan Byrne Arena
Pittsburgh Spirit	Pittsburgh	Civic Arena (Pittsburgh)
San Diego Sockers	San Diego	San Diego Sports Arena
St. Louis Steamers	St. Louis	St. Louis Arena
Tacoma Stars	Tacoma, Washington	Tacoma Dome
Wichita Wings	Wichita, Kansas	Kansas Coliseum

== Map of clubs ==
Eastern Division Western Division

== Regular season schedule ==
The 1984–85 regular season schedule ran from November 2, 1984, to April 14, 1985. Despite the Cosmos leaving the league in mid-season, each team played their scheduled 48 games with the exception of Wichita.

== Final standings ==
Playoff teams in bold.

Eastern Division	W	L	Pct.	GB	GF	GA	Home	Road
**Baltimore Blast**	32	16	.667	--	252	190	19-5	13-11
**Chicago Sting**	28	20	.583	4	261	223	20-4	8-16
**Cleveland Force**	27	21	.563	5	239	228	15-9	12-12
**Minnesota Strikers**	24	24	.500	8	224	226	16-8	8-16
**St. Louis Steamers**	24	24	.500	8	211	207	16-8	8-16
Pittsburgh Spirit	19	29	.396	13	217	256	16-8	3-21
New York Cosmos	11	22	.333	13½	137	185	7-9	4-13

Western Division	W	L	Pct.	GB	GF	GA	Home	Road
**San Diego Sockers**	37	11	.771	--	302	201	18-6	19-5
**Las Vegas Americans**	30	18	.625	7	269	214	18-6	12-12
**Los Angeles Lazers**	24	24	.500	13	232	230	14-10	10-14
**Kansas City Comets**	22	26	.458	15	216	221	13-11	9-15
**Wichita Wings**	21	26	.437	15½	202	233	14-10	7-16
Tacoma Stars	17	31	.354	20	207	263	11-13	6-18
Dallas Sidekicks	12	36	.333	25	194	286	8-16	4-20

== Playoffs ==
Wildcard Series
WC2	St. Louis Steamers	1
WC3	Kansas City Comets	2
WC1	Minnesota Strikers	2
WC4	Wichita Wings	1

Division Semifinals
1	San Diego Sockers	3
8	Kansas City Comets	0
3	Las Vegas Americans	1
6	Minnesota Strikers	3
2	Baltimore Blast	3
7	Los Angeles Lazers	0
4	Chicago Sting	2
5	Cleveland Force	3

Division Finals
1	San Diego Sockers	3
6	Minnesota Strikers	2
2	Baltimore Blast	3
5	Cleveland Force	2

Championship Series
1	San Diego Sockers	4
2	Baltimore Blast	1

=== Wildcard Series ===
Minnesota vs. Wichita
Date	Away	Home	Attendance
April 17	Wichita 1	**Minnesota 2**	4,233
April 19	Minnesota 3	**Wichita 8**	7,053
April 21	Wichita 2	**Minnesota 3**	4,032
	Jan Goossens scored at 2:45 of overtime
**Minnesota wins series 2-1**

St. Louis vs. Kansas City
Date	Away	Home	Attendance
April 17	**Kansas City 5**	St. Louis 4	7,636
	Damir Haramina scored at 8:14 of overtime
April 19	St. Louis 3	**Kansas City 2**	10,241
	Tasso Koutsoukos scored at 1:22 of overtime
**Kansas City wins series 2-0**

=== Quarterfinals ===
San Diego vs. Kansas City
Date	Away	Home	Attendance
April 24	Kansas City 3	**San Diego 4**	7,552
	Brian Quinn scored at 11:45 of overtime
April 26	Kansas City 7	**San Diego 11**	9,560
April 28	**San Diego 3**	Kansas City 2	10,458
**San Diego wins series 3-0**

Chicago vs. Cleveland
Date	Away	Home	Attendance
April 19	**Cleveland 5**	Chicago 4	6,550
	Peter Ward scored at 10:31 of overtime
April 21	Cleveland 4	**Chicago 8**	5,005
April 24	Chicago 1	**Cleveland 6**	8,112
April 27	Chicago 4	**Cleveland 5**	11,248
	Keith Furphy scored at 5:01 of overtime
**Cleveland wins series 3-1**

Baltimore vs. Los Angeles
Date	Away	Home	Attendance
April 24	Los Angeles 3	**Baltimore 4**	7,108
April 26	Los Angeles 3	**Baltimore 11**	9,493
April 28	**Baltimore 5**	Los Angeles 4	4,746
**Baltimore wins series 3-0**

Las Vegas vs. Minnesota
Date	Away	Home	Attendance
April 24	**Minnesota 6**	Las Vegas 5	5,278
April 26	Minnesota 4	**Las Vegas 6**	6,016
April 28	Las Vegas 2	**Minnesota 3**	7,134
May 1	Las Vegas 1	**Minnesota 4**	5,094
**Minnesota wins series 3-1**

=== Semifinals ===
San Diego vs. Minnesota
Date	Away	Home	Attendance
May 5	Minnesota 1	**San Diego 8**	8,494
May 8	Minnesota 5	**San Diego 6**	10,143
	Jean Willrich scored at 1:15 of overtime
May 10	San Diego 5	**Minnesota 8**	8,270
May 12	San Diego 3	**Minnesota 4**	7,871
	Minnesota wins shootout 3-2**
May 14	Minnesota 0	**San Diego 7**	10,059
**San Diego wins series 3-2**

Baltimore vs. Cleveland
Date	Away	Home	Attendance
May 3	Cleveland 5	**Baltimore 6**	7,568
May 5	**Cleveland 5**	Baltimore 3	8,205
May 10	Baltimore 3	**Cleveland 4**	13,093
May 11	**Baltimore 7**	Cleveland 6	13,861
May 14	Cleveland 4	**Baltimore 7**	9,184
**Baltimore wins series 3-2**

**San Diego won the shootout 4-3, but Minnesota appealed the result, as the Sockers used an ineligible player. The Strikers were declared winners on May 13.

=== Championship Series ===
San Diego vs. Baltimore
Date	Away	Home	Attendance
May 17	Baltimore 4	**San Diego 5**	11,639
May 19	Baltimore 3	**San Diego 7**	12,185
May 23	San Diego 6	**Baltimore 10**	11,074
May 25	**San Diego 14**	Baltimore 2	9,084
May 28	Baltimore 3	**San Diego 5**	12,948
**San Diego wins series 4-1**

== Regular season player statistics ==
=== Scoring leaders ===
GP = Games Played, G = Goals, A = Assists, Pts = Points

Player	Team	GP	G	A	Pts
Steve Zungul	San Diego Sockers	48	68	68	136
Karl-Heinz Granitza	Chicago Sting	47	64	53	117
Branko Segota	San Diego Sockers	46	66	40	106
Stan Stamenkovic	Baltimore Blast	43	39	52	91
Tatu	Dallas Sidekicks	43	59	29	88
Dale Mitchell	Tacoma Stars	48	55	32	87
Jean Willrich	San Diego Sockers	48	43	43	86
Fred Grgurev	Las Vegas Americans	48	48	29	77
Craig Allen	Cleveland Force	42	45	30	75
Jan Goossens	Minnesota Strikers	48	49	24	73

=== Leading goalkeepers ===
Note: GP = Games played; Min = Minutes played; GA = Goals against; GAA = Goals against average; W = Wins; L = Losses

Player	Team	GP	Min	GA	GAA	W	L
Scott Manning	Baltimore Blast	36	2080	135	3.89	23	11
Slobo Illjevski	St. Louis Steamers	30	1681	112	4.00	11	12
Jim Gorsek	San Diego Sockers	30	1665	112	4.04	19	8
Manny Schwartz	Kansas City Comets	40	2192	152	4.16	19	15
Alan Mayer	Las Vegas Americans	30	1759	124	4.23	17	12
Victor Nogueira	Chicago Sting	43	2440	162	4.34	23	15
Tino Lettieri	Minnesota Strikers	45	2672	198	4.45	24	21
Cris Vaccaro	Cleveland Force	27	1453	108	4.46	16	8
Mike Dowler	Wichita Wings	41	2394	179	4.49	20	20
John Baretta	Tacoma Stars	31	1637	127	4.65	11	13

== Playoff player statistics ==
=== Scoring leaders ===
GP = Games Played, G = Goals, A = Assists, Pts = Points

Player	Team	GP	G	A	Pts
Steve Zungul	San Diego Sockers	13	13	24	37
Branko Segota	San Diego Sockers	13	22	8	30
Jean Willrich	San Diego Sockers	13	11	12	23
Brian Quinn	San Diego Sockers	13	11	11	22
Andy Chapman	Cleveland Force	9	14	5	19
Stan Stamenkovic	Baltimore Blast	11	8	11	19

=== Leading goalkeepers ===
Note: GP = Games played; Min = Minutes played; GA = Goals against; GAA = Goals against average; W = Wins; L = Losses

Player	Team	GP	Min	GA	GAA	W	L
Jim Gorsek	San Diego Sockers	9	516	21	2.44	7	1
Mike Dowler	Wichita Wings	3	180	8	2.67	1	2
Cris Vaccaro	Cleveland Force	9	546	38	4.18	5	3
Slobo Ilijevski	St. Louis Steamers	2	129	9	4.19	0	2
Tino Lettieri	Minnesota Strikers	11	667	51	4.59	6	5
Manny Schwartz	Kansas City Comets	4	222	17	4.59	2	2

== All-MISL teams ==
First Team	Position	Second Team
Scott Manning, Baltimore	G	Slobo Ilijevski, St. Louis
Mike Stankovic, Baltimore	D	Jorge Espinoza, Las Vegas
Branko Segota, San Diego	D	Jean Willrich, San Diego
Kevin Crow, San Diego	M	Kim Roentved, Wichita
Steve Zungul, San Diego	F	Stan Stamenkovic, Baltimore
Karl-Heinz Granitza, Chicago	F	Tatu, Dallas

Honorable Mention	Position
Jim Gorsek, San Diego	G
Bruce Savage, Baltimore	D
Gerry Gray, Chicago	D
Benny Dargle, Cleveland	M
Dale Mitchell, Tacoma	F
Fred Grgurev, Las Vegas	F

== League awards ==
- Most Valuable Player: Steve Zungul, San Diego
- Scoring Champion: Steve Zungul, San Diego
- Pass Master: Steve Zungul, San Diego
- Defender of the Year: Kevin Crow, San Diego
- Rookie of the Year: Ali Kazemaini, Cleveland
- Goalkeeper of the Year: Scott Manning, Baltimore
- Coach of the Year: Peter Wall, Los Angeles
- Championship Series Most Valuable Player: Steve Zungul, San Diego

== Team attendance totals ==
Club	Games	Total	Average
Cleveland Force	24	310,284	12,929
Kansas City Comets	24	310,017	12,917
St. Louis Steamers	24	305,054	12,711
Baltimore Blast	24	265,224	11,051
Chicago Sting	24	255,073	10,628
San Diego Sockers	24	230,272	9,595
Wichita Wings	24	209,035	8,710
Pittsburgh Spirit	24	187,021	7,793
Tacoma Stars	24	173,317	7,222
Las Vegas Americans	24	152,083	6,337
Los Angeles Lazers	24	121,488	5,062
Dallas Sidekicks	24	119,248	4,969
Minnesota Strikers	24	115,408	4,809
New York Cosmos	16	66,900	4,181
**OVERALL**	**328**	**2,820,424**	**8,599**
