= Steve Litt =

English footballer and manager

Personal information
- Full name: Stephen Eric Litt
- Date of birth: 21 May 1954 (age 72)
- Place of birth: Carlisle, England
- Position: Defender

Youth career
- Blackpool

Senior career*
Years	Team	Apps	(Gls)
1972–1976	Luton Town	15	(0)
1976–1981	Minnesota Kicks	153	(11)
1977–1978	Northampton Town	20	(0)
1982–1984	San Jose Earthquakes	67	(1)
1982–1983	Golden Bay Earthquakes (indoor)	38	(4)
1984–1985	Minnesota Strikers (indoor)	20	(0)

Managerial career
- 1985: San Jose Earthquakes (assistant)
- 1986: San Jose Earthquakes
- 2008–: Dakota County Technical College (assistant)
- * Club domestic league appearances and goals

Stephen Eric Litt (born 21 May 1954) is an English retired football defender who played professionally in the Football League, North American Soccer League and Major Indoor Soccer League and coached in the Western Soccer Alliance.

== Player ==
Litt began his career as an apprentice with Blackpool In 1972, Litt left Blackpool for Luton Town. He cracked the first team in 1973, but made only fifteen total first team appearances. In 1976, he left England for the United States where he signed with the Minnesota Kicks of the North American Soccer League. He returned to England to Northampton Town during the 1977–1978 season. In 1982, Litt moved to the San Jose Earthquakes for three outdoor and one indoor seasons. In 1984, he returned to Minnesota, this time as a member of the Minnesota Strikers playing in the Major Indoor Soccer League. He retired from playing professionally in the spring of 1985 and turned to coaching.

== Coach ==
In 1985, the San Jose Earthquakes hired Litt as head coach of its reserve team. In 1986, Litt served as the head coach of the Earthquakes in the Western Soccer Alliance. In August 1986, he left the team after going unpaid for over a month. In 2008, he became an assistant coach with the Dakota County Technical College soccer team.
