= Alan Willey (footballer, born 1956) =

English footballer

Personal information
- Date of birth: 18 October 1956 (age 70)
- Place of birth: Houghton-le-Spring, England
- Position: Striker

Senior career*
Years	Team	Apps	(Gls)
1974–1977	Middlesbrough	49	(7)
1976–1981	Minnesota Kicks	134	(80)
1979–1981	Minnesota Kicks (indoor)	30	(39)
1981–1982	Montreal Manic (indoor)	10	(2)
1981–1983	Montreal Manic	80	(34)
1984	Minnesota Strikers	24	(15)
1984–1988	Minnesota Strikers (indoor)	191	(151)
1988–1989	San Diego Sockers (indoor)	47	(20)
- * Club domestic league appearances and goals

Alan Willey (born 18 October 1956) is an English former footballer who spent most of his playing career in the United States. He was inducted into the National Soccer Hall of Fame in 2003.

Born in Houghton-le-Spring, Willey is the second-leading goal scorer in the history of the North American Soccer League (NASL). Willey played most of his career with the Minnesota Kicks and was inducted into the U.S. National Soccer Hall of Fame in 2003.

He began his career with the English football club Middlesbrough in 1974. In the NASL, he played for the Minnesota Kicks (1976 to 1981), the Montreal Manic (1981 to 1983) and the Minnesota Strikers (1984).

He finished his NASL career with 129 goals in 238 games and an additional 13 goals in 26 play-off games. He memorably scored five goals in a play-off game against the New York Cosmos in 1978. His nickname was 'The Artful Dodger.'
