= Mike Hunter (soccer) =

American soccer player

Personal information
- Full name: Michael Hunter
- Date of birth: September 30, 1958 (age 68)
- Place of birth: Los Angeles, California, United States
- Height: 5 ft 9 in (1.75 m)
- Position: Defender

Youth career
- 1976–1979: Santa Clara University

Senior career*
Years	Team	Apps	(Gls)
1979–1980	Detroit Lightning (indoor)	20	(4)
1980–1982	San Jose Earthquakes	60	(1)
1982–1983	→ Golden Bay Earthquakes (indoor)	46	(13)
1983–1984	→ Golden Bay Earthquakes	38	(1)
1984–1986	Los Angeles Lazers (indoor)	52	(4)
1985	San Jose Earthquakes		
- * Club domestic league appearances and goals

Mike Hunter is a retired U.S. soccer defender who played five seasons in the North American Soccer League as well as one in the Western Soccer Alliance and three in the Major Indoor Soccer League.

Hunter grew up in the Los Angeles area, attending Damien High School in La Verne, California. He then played soccer at Santa Clara University from 1976 thru 1979. In the fall of 1979, he signed with the expansion Detroit Lightning in the Major Indoor Soccer League as the first pick of the first MISL draft. The Lightning folded at the end of the 1979–1980 season and Hunter moved to the San Jose Earthquakes as their first pick in the North American Soccer League draft. He would play five outdoor seasons with the Earthquakes in the NASL. In 1983 and 1984, the team was renamed the Golden Bay Earthquakes. In the fall of 1984, the Earthquakes dealt Hunter to the Los Angeles Lazers of the Major Indoor Soccer League. According to the San Diego Union, Hunter "a five-year indoor veteran . . . was acquired from Golden Bay." Hunter spent two seasons with the Lazers before a contentious release after the trade deadline on March 1, 1986, as the team prepared for the play-offs. In addition to playing the winter indoor seasons with the Lazers, on June 5, 1985, Hunter returned north to sign with the Earthquakes for an eighteen-game non-league exhibition season. By this time the NASL had collapsed and the Earthquakes no longer belonged to a league. In October 1986, Hunter went on trial with the San Diego Sockers, but there is no indication that he played for them.
