= Paul Bradshaw (footballer, born 1956) =

English footballer (1956–2024)

Personal information
- Full name: Paul William Bradshaw
- Date of birth: 28 April 1956
- Place of birth: Altrincham, England
- Date of death: c. February 2024 (aged 67)
- Height: 6 ft 3 in (1.91 m)
- Position: Goalkeeper

Youth career
- 1972–1973: Blackburn Rovers

Senior career*
Years	Team	Apps	(Gls)
1973–1977	Blackburn Rovers	78	(0)
1977–1984	Wolverhampton Wanderers	200	(0)
1984	Vancouver Whitecaps	24	(0)
1985–1986	West Bromwich Albion	8	(0)
1986–1987	Bristol Rovers	5	(0)
1987–1988	Newport County	23	(0)
1988–1990	West Bromwich Albion	6	(0)
1990–1991	Peterborough United	39	(0)
1991–1992	Kettering Town		

International career
1974	England Youth	4	(0)
1976–1978	England U21	4	(0)
- * Club domestic league appearances and goals

Paul William Bradshaw (28 April 1956 – c. February 2024) was an English professional footballer who played as a goalkeeper in the Football League for Blackburn Rovers, Wolverhampton Wanderers, West Bromwich Albion, Bristol Rovers, Newport County and Peterborough United, and in the North American Soccer League for the Vancouver Whitecaps.

== Career ==
Paul William Bradshaw was born in Altrincham, and began his career as an apprentice at Blackburn Rovers. He signed professionally in June 1973, and broke into the first team in the following season, making 18 appearances in the Third Division. He came to prominence in the 1976–77 season, when he made 41 league appearances, and played in the first ever England under-21 international match, thus attracting the attention of First Division club Wolverhampton Wanderers.

Wolves paid a club record £150,000 for Bradshaw in September 1977. He made his debut on 1 October 1977 in a 3–0 home win over Leicester City, and remained the first-choice goalkeeper for the next five seasons. Bradshaw made 243 appearances for Wolves in total, winning the 1980 League Cup, playing in two FA Cup semi-finals and appearing in European competition. He was voted the club's Player of the Year in both 1981 and 1982.

Bradshaw lost his place to John Burridge for the 1982–83 season, as the club won promotion back to the top flight at the first attempt. Bradshaw remained to play 10 more First Division games for the side before leaving in August 1984 to join the Vancouver Whitecaps of the North American Soccer League.

After the American league folded, Bradshaw returned to England, joining West Bromwich Albion in February 1985 as a back-up player. He then took up a coaching role at Walsall in June 1986, but soon returned to playing, signing for Bristol Rovers on a non-contract basis, and later played in Newport County's final season in the Football League. After a second spell at West Bromwich Albion, he played the 1990–91 season with Peterborough United and finished his career in non-league football with Kettering Town before retiring in 1992.

== Death ==
On 22 February 2024, it was announced that he had died aged 67.

== Honours ==
Wolverhampton Wanderers

- Football League Cup: 1979–80
