= David Byrne (soccer, born 1960) =

South African footballer

Personal information
- Date of birth: 11 January 1960 (age 66)
- Place of birth: Guildford, England
- Position: Striker

Senior career*
Years	Team	Apps	(Gls)
1979–1981	Atlanta Chiefs (indoor)	28	(37)
1980–1981	Atlanta Chiefs	51	(4)
1981–1982	Toronto Blizzard (indoor)	18	(0)
1982–1984	Toronto Blizzard	81	(33)
1983–1984	Estoril	14	(1)
1984–1985	Belenenses	19	(1)
1985–1988	Minnesota Strikers (indoor)	117	(68)
1987	North York Rockets	3	(0)
1987–1989	Toronto Blizzard (CSL)	39	(15)
1988–1990	Baltimore Blast (indoor)	64	(32)
1989–1992	Wichita Wings (indoor)	104	(54)
1990–1991	Tampa Bay Rowdies (APSL)		
1994	Hellenic		
1998–1999	Santos		

Managerial career
- 1997: Michau Warriors (assistant)
- 1998–1999: Santos (assistant)
- 2000–2003: Black Leopards (assistant)
- 2003: Black Leopards (interim)
- 2004: Avendale Athletico
- * Club domestic league appearances and goals

David Byrne is an English-born South African soccer coach and former professional player. He was in 1982 and 1984 a top ten scorer in the North American Soccer League.

== Player ==
=== Professional ===
The son of former England international and West Ham United star Johnny Byrne, Byrne was born in England, but raised in Cape Town. In 1979, Byrne moved to the United States where he joined the Atlanta Chiefs just in time for the 1979–1980 North American Soccer League indoor season. He continued to play for the Chiefs until 1981 when he moved to the Toronto Blizzard where he played one indoor and three outdoor seasons. He finished the 1982 season ninth on the scoring list with 39 points in 32 games. He led the league in assists as Blizzard teammates (and fellow South Africans) Neill Roberts and Ace Ntsoelengoe finished seventh and eighth respectively in scoring. He finished 1983 sixth with 44 points in 29 games and 1984 seventh with 37 points in 20 games. Bryne was named to the NASL All-League Second Team in both 1983 and 1984. He was the league's 35th all time scorer with 142 points in 135 games. Byrne also played briefly in Portugal. He played 14 times for Estoril in 1983–1984 scoring once, and 19 games and 1 goal for Belenenses in 1984–1985. In 1985, Byrne signed with the Minnesota Strikers of the Major Indoor Soccer League and was the league's 11th leading scorer for the 1987–88 season. In 1987, he played for the Toronto Rockets, but quickly moved to the Toronto Blizzard of the CSL and spent two summers in the APSL with the Tampa Bay Rowdies. During that same time he played for the Baltimore Blast and Wichita Wings of the MISL, which played during the winter months. He later played in South Africa with Hellenic in 1994 and then joined Santos in 1998–1999.

=== National team ===
In 1994, Byrne earned a South Africa U-23 cap as an overaged player and was twice called up to the national side but failed to win any caps.

== Manager ==
For the past decade Byrne has been an assistant coach with South African clubs. He has his first stint with Port Elizabeth side Michau Warriors, in 1997. He 1998–99 he was player-coach of Santos. In 2001, he became assistant coach of Black Leopards and then in 2003 the club's caretaker manager. After that he managed Avendale Athletico before being dismissed in November 2004.

David's brother Mark Byrne is a former pro player, manager in South Africa and former head coach of Italian club Udinese's coaching academy.
