= Gary Etherington =

English-American soccer player (born 1958)

Personal information
- Date of birth: April 22, 1958 (age 68)
- Place of birth: London, England
- Height: 5 ft 8 in (1.73 m)
- Positions: Forward; midfielder; defender

Senior career*
Years	Team	Apps	(Gls)
1977–1979	New York Cosmos	43	(5)
1980	Los Angeles Aztecs	32	(2)
1981–1982	San Jose Earthquakes	62	(7)
1982–1983	Golden Bay Earthquakes (indoor)	20	(8)
1983–1984	New York Arrows (indoor)	40	(7)
1984	Minnesota Strikers	17	(1)
1984–1988	Minnesota Strikers (indoor)	132	(12)
1988–1989	San Diego Sockers (indoor)	10	(0)
Total		356	(42)

International career
1976	United States U20		
1977–1979	United States	7	(0)
- * Club domestic league appearances and goals

Gary Etherington (born April 22, 1958, in England) is a retired soccer player who began his professional career in the North American Soccer League before moving to the Major Indoor Soccer League. He earned seven caps with the U.S. national team. Since retiring, Etherington has coached youth soccer and is a soccer equipment salesman.

== Youth ==
Etherington was born in England but migrated to the U.S. with his family when he was fifteen. His family settled in Virginia where he attended Mount Vernon High School in Alexandria, Virginia, playing both soccer and as a placekicker on his high school football team. Etherington was also a member of the United States U-20 men's national soccer team in 1976 as it attempted to qualify for the 1977 FIFA World Youth Championship. Etherington scored six goals to go with striker partner Rick Davis who scored eight. Despite their outstanding production, the U.S. finished third in the CONCACAF and did not qualify for the tournament.

In 1976, The New York Cosmos of the North American Soccer League sign 18-year-old Gary Etherington. The previous spring he was on the Annandale, Virginia team that beat Westport in overtime, in Westport, in the Eastern U.S. finals, then went on to capture what is now the U-19 McGuire Cup national championship. The Annandale Cavaliers defeated Fountain Valley, California 4–0 in the semi-finals and Sparta of Chicago (3–0) in the finals. Future Cosmos teammate Ricky Davis played for Fountain Valley.

== NASL ==
After graduating from high school, Etherington chose to bypass college and turn professional. He signed with the New York Cosmos of the North American Soccer League in 1977 as an amateur player and saw time in ten games that year. However, 1978 was considered his first professional season with the Cosmos. As such, he earned NASL Rookie of the Year honors that season. Etherington remained with the Cosmos for only one more season before being traded to the Los Angeles Aztecs before the 1980 season. While Etherington had begun as a forward with the Cosmos, his lack of production had led to his move to the midfield. When the Aztecs traded Etherington to the San Jose Earthquakes at the end of the 1980 season, Etherington found himself at right back for the 1981 season. However, in 1982, he was back in the midfield. Etherington moved once more, this time to the Minnesota Strikers for the 1984 NASL season, the last for the league as it folded at the end of the season.

== MISL ==
The Earthquakes entered Major Indoor Soccer League for the 1982–1983 indoor season. Etherington began the season with San Jose, but on January 20, 1983, the Earthquakes traded Etherington and Gordon Hill to the New York Arrows for Steve Zungul. At the time the Earthquakes played in both the NASL and MISL while the Arrows played exclusively in the MISL. With this move, Etherington got his first taste of indoor soccer. The Arrows folded at the end of the 1983–1984 season and Etherington moved to the Minnesota Strikers for the 1984 NASL outdoor season. When the NASL collapsed in 1984, the Strikers moved to MISL. Etherington remained with the Strikers and spent the next four seasons with them playing indoor soccer, tallying more appearances than any other player during the club's MISL period. In 1987, he played in the MISL All Star game. In 1988, Etherington moved to the San Diego Sockers for one last season before retiring from playing professionally. He had knee surgery during the pre-season, came back to play ten games then retired in January 1989.

== National team ==
Etherington earned seven caps with the U.S. national team between 1977 and 1979. His first match came in a 2–1 win over El Salvador. He played sporadically throughout 1977, then started all three U.S. games in 1978. His last match came in the first U.S. game of 1979, a February 3 loss to the Soviet Union.

== Post–playing career ==
Since retiring from playing professionally, Etherington has been involved in numerous ventures related to soccer. He co-founded the Murrieta Soccer Club in 1992, coaching the club's youth teams for five years. He has also spent several years in adult leagues in northern California.

Etherington has been a regional sales manager for soccer equipment and clothing companies, including Umbro.

In 2007, Etherington was inducted into the Virginia Soccer Hall of Fame.
