= Tony Powell (footballer) =

English footballer

Personal information
- Date of birth: 11 June 1947 (age 79)
- Place of birth: Bristol, England
- Position: Central defender

Youth career
- Lawrence Weston Boys
- National Smelting FC
- Bath City

Senior career*
Years	Team	Apps	(Gls)
1968–1974	AFC Bournemouth	219	(10)
1974–1981	Norwich City	237	(3)
1981–1982	San Jose Earthquakes	48	(1)
1981–1982	San Jose Earthquakes (indoor)		
1982–1983	Golden Bay Earthquakes (indoor)	43	(5)
1983	Seattle Sounders	19	(1)
Total		566	(20)
- * Club domestic league appearances and goals

Tony Powell (born 11 June 1947) is an English former football defender who played professionally in England and the United States. Starting with English team AFC Bournemouth, he joined Norwich City F.C. in 1974, earning its Player of the Season award in 1979. He then moved to the United States in 1981 to play for the San Jose Earthquakes and then Seattle Sounders FC.

Powell moved to West Hollywood, California after ending his football career, and became manager of the Holloway Motel there for 25 years before it was converted into temporary housing for homeless people. In 2025, a documentary about Powell, The Last Guest of the Holloway Motel, was released, about his experiences as a closeted gay footballer and his disappearance from the public eye after his sporting career ended.

== Career ==
=== Footballer ===
Powell began his career with AFC Bournemouth. In 1974, Bournemouth sent him to Norwich City, in exchange for Trevor Howard. Norwich won the promotion to First Division soon after this. He was voted Norwich City Player of the Season in 1979. He was seen as a "family man" figure in the team.

In August 1981, Powell moved to the United States, playing for the San Jose Earthquakes in the North American Soccer League. He spent two outdoor and two indoor seasons with the Earthquakes. During the second indoor season, the Earthquakes, under the name Golden Bay Earthquakes, competed in the Major Indoor Soccer League. In 1983, he moved to the Seattle Sounders.

=== Hotel manager ===
After retiring from football, he moved to West Hollywood, California. There, he managed the Holloway Motel for 25 years. In September 2025, Powell was the last occupant of the hotel before its closure, after which the building began offering temporary housing for homeless people. Nick Freeman has noted that Powell "would sit there, 12 hours a day, glass of wine in hand, laptop in front of him", often watching football.

==== The Last Guest of the Holloway Motel ====
Powell was the subject of the 2025 documentary The Last Guest of the Holloway Motel, which focused on Powell's experiences as a closeted gay footballer and his disappearance from the public eye following the conclusion of his career. The film is co-directed by Ramiel Petros and Nick Freeman, who initially intended for The Last Guest to be a short film about the closing of the motel and the city's homeless crisis, and co-produced by Andrew D. Corkin and gay soccer player Robbie Rogers, who had often walked past Powell's motel during his time with the LA Galaxy. The film follows Powell as he decides whether to re-establish contact with his family He is praised in the film by his Norwich City teammate Mick McGuire. The Last Guest had its world premiere at the Tribeca Festival; at a sold-out screening on 8 June 2025.

== Personal life ==
Powell was married and has two daughters, from whom he became estranged after ending his marriage.

=== Homosexuality ===
Powell is a gay man, though remained closeted about this during his football career. Playing for Norwich, he has since said in reference to loneliness as a gay footballer that "it felt like there was no one you could talk to. It was difficult." Between 1978 and 1981, Powell was a teammate at Norwich City with Justin Fashanu, who would later also come out as gay in 1990. Powell knew during their time as teammates that Fashanu was gay, but has since said that Fashanu "didn’t want to talk about it. He thought if he came out as gay his career would be over." Powell remained closeted while playing for the San Jose Earthquakes and Seattle Sounders.

After retiring from football, Powell was convinced that his family in England would shun him for his homosexuality and thus cut ties with them; they did not know where he was for 35 years after this. He has said he chose to live in West Hollywood "Because it was gay. People go to West Hollywood because they feel safe. They move from places where they’re getting harassed to somewhere they can live freely." He entered a relationship with David Castro. Castro later contracted HIV which then developed into AIDS. Rather than send him to a hospice, Powell cared for Castro at home. Castro died due to AIDS in the 1980s.

In the early 2000s, the British press gained knowledge of Powell's location and reported that he had divorced his wife and was living with "a male friend", reporting sensational claims that Powell was "a transvestite", which Powell denied. During his time managing the motel, his assistant manager Erica came out as transgender to him, and he helped her to accept herself.

In 2025, Powell came out publicly as gay. He has said that:

One of the big reasons I came out in public was that I wanted to try and change football so young gay men could be themselves. But I’ve heard this from different people over the years – everyone is too afraid. I understand, so I’m not saying anyone is cowardly. But it’s been a little sad for me that other footballers haven’t been able to come out.

== Honours ==
Norwich City

- Football League Cup runner-up: 1974–75
