= Tino Lettieri =

Canadian soccer player (born 1957)

Personal information
- Full name: Martino Lettieri
- Date of birth: 27 September 1957 (age 69)
- Place of birth: Bari, Italy
- Height: 5 ft 8 in (1.73 m)
- Position: Goalkeeper

Senior career*
Years	Team	Apps	(Gls)
1976	Montreal Castors		
1977–1981	Minnesota Kicks	88	(0)
1980–1981	Minnesota Kicks (indoor)	14	(0)
1982–1983	Vancouver Whitecaps	55	(0)
1984	Vancouver Whitecaps (indoor)	13	(0)
1984	Minnesota Strikers	18	(0)
1984–1987	Minnesota Strikers (indoor)	121	(0)
1987	Hamilton Steelers	9	(0)

International career
1980–1986	Canada	24	(0)
Medal record
Representing Canada
Men's Association football
CONCACAF Championship
Winner	1985 North America
- * Club domestic league appearances and goals

Martino "Tino" Lettieri (born 27 September 1957) is a former NASL and MISL professional soccer goalkeeper, who represented Canada twice at the Summer Olympics: 1976 and 1984 and at the 1986 FIFA World Cup.

== Club career ==
Lettieri began his pro career with the Montreal Castors in the National Soccer League in 1976. In 1977, he played with the Minnesota Kicks in the North American Soccer League and played there until 1981. He went on to play the Vancouver Whitecaps in 1982 and 1983 and the Minnesota Strikers in 1984. He was named NASL North American Player of the Year in 1983 and had the league's best Goals Against Average in both 1982 and 1983.

Lettieri was a regular in the original MISL. He continued to play for the Strikers as the team joined the indoor league, playing the 1984–85 season through to 1987–88. Lettieri was voted Goalkeeper of the Year for the 1986–87 season. Lettieri led the Strikers to a runner-up finish in the MISL playoffs during the 1985-86 season, as the team fell 4-3 in the championship round to the San Diego Sockers. Two years later, the Strikers won the Eastern Division.

Lettieri finished his outdoor career in 1987 with the Hamilton Steelers in Canadian Soccer League. He was elected to the Canadian Soccer Hall of Fame in 2001.

Lettieri is often remembered for his keeping a stuffed parrot in the back of his net during games. The bird was named "Ozzie". In 1985 the league banned Ozzie from the nets.

== International career ==
Lettieri made his full international debut for Canada on 17 September 1980 in a 3–0 victory over New Zealand in Edmonton. He earned 24 caps for Canada and was the first-choice goalkeeper from 1980 until 1986. In the 1986 World Cup, Lettieri played two of Canada's three matches, the latter of which, a 0–2 defeat to the Soviet Union in Irapuato, was his final international appearance. In 2001, Lettieri was honored by the Canada Soccer Hall of Fame, and a year later was named a member of the Quebec Soccer Hall of Fame. He was named by Canada Soccer as one of the top 100 Canadian footballers of all time in 2012.

== Personal life ==
Lettieri is married to Michelle Nanne, the daughter of Minnesota North Stars hockey player and general manager Lou Nanne. He now runs a successful food products business, Tino's Cafe Pizzeria, in Shorewood, Minnesota. His son, Vinni, played hockey for the University of Minnesota and signed with the New York Rangers in 2017.

== Honours ==
Canada

- CONCACAF Championship: 1985
