= Ade Coker =

American soccer player

Personal information
- Full name: Adewunmi Olarewaju Coker
- Date of birth: 19 May 1954 (age 72)
- Place of birth: Lagos, Nigeria
- Position: Forward

Senior career*
Years	Team	Apps	(Gls)
1971–1975	West Ham United	10	(3)
1974	→ Boston Minutemen (loan)	19	(7)
1974–1975	→ Lincoln City (loan)	6	(1)
1975–1976	Boston Minutemen	29	(14)
1976–1978	Minnesota Kicks	28	(11)
1978–1979	San Diego Sockers	13	(7)
1979–1980	New York Arrows (indoor)	15	(7)
1980	Rochester Lancers	6	(0)
1980–1981	Baltimore Blast (indoor)	35	(14)
1982–1984	San Diego Sockers	62	(33)
1984–1987	San Diego Sockers (indoor)	74	(48)
1987–1988	St. Louis Steamers (indoor)	68	(21)

International career
1984	United States	5	(3)
- * Club domestic league appearances and goals

Adewunmi Olarewaju "Ade" Coker (born 19 May 1954) is a former soccer player who played as a striker. Coker began with English club West Ham United then moved to the North American Soccer League and the Major Indoor Soccer League. Born in Nigeria, he earned five caps for the United States national team.

== Professional career ==
Coker was born in Nigeria, but moved to England at the age of 11. He was playing schoolboy football when he was spotted by West Ham scout Wally St Pier. In 1971, he signed with the English First Division club West Ham United when he was 17. His first start with the Hammers came on 30 October 1971, against Crystal Palace at Selhurst Park following a late injury to Geoff Hurst. He scored on his debut, a 3–0 victory, but despite this auspicious first game, he made only eleven first team appearances over three seasons. He spent the 1974 off-season with the Boston Minutemen of the North American Soccer League (NASL), earning Second Team All Star honors. Returning to England, in December 1974 he joined Lincoln City on loan, making his debut in the 2–0 home victory over Stockport County on 20 December 1974. He remained with the Imps for a month before returning to West Ham.

Coker then moved permanently to America, rejoining the Boston Minutemen. Halfway through the 1976 season, Minutemen owner John Sterge began selling his players in order to forestall bankruptcy. Coker was sent to the Minnesota Kicks. After the Kick's playoff victory over the Tampa Bay Rowdies, Coker's shoes were stolen off his feet by a jubilant fan. Three games into the 1978 season, Minnesota traded Coker to the San Diego Sockers. At the end of the 1979 season, the Sockers sent Coker to the Rochester Lancers for the 1980 season. Coker spent the 1980–1981 Major Indoor Soccer League club Baltimore Blast. In 1982 Coker was back with San Diego as the Sockers began to transition towards indoor soccer. When the NASL collapsed following the 1984 season, the Sockers moved to MISL and became the league's dominant team. Coker remained with the Sockers until 1987. He spent one more season (1987–1988) in MISL with the St. Louis Steamers.

== U.S. national team ==
Coker earned 5 caps with the U.S. national team. He earned his first cap in a September 9, 1984, scoreless draw with the Netherlands Antilles. A month later, he scored twice in a 4–0 victory over the Netherlands Antilles after coming on for Chance Fry. He scored again two matches later, a 1–0 victory over Colombia. He played his fifth and last match for the U.S. in a 2–1 loss to Mexico on October 17, 1984.

== Post-Career ==
In 2008, Coker alongside his West Ham teammates, Clive Charles and Clyde Best, were the subjects of the book 'East End Heroes, Stateside Kings'.

Coker is also set to star in a 2026 documentary film about Best's career, titled Transforming the Beautiful Game: The Clyde Best Story
