= Tony Crescitelli =

Italian-American soccer player

Personal information
- Date of birth: January 11, 1957 (age 69)
- Place of birth: Altavilla Irpina, Italy
- Height: 5 ft 11 in (1.80 m)
- Position: Forward

College career
Years	Team	Apps	(Gls)
1975–1978	North Adams State College		

Senior career*
Years	Team	Apps	(Gls)
1979–1980	Washington Diplomats	26	(5)
1979–1980	Fort Lauderdale Strikers (indoor)	4	(4)
1980–1983	San Jose Earthquakes (indoor)	42	(40)
1981–1983	San Jose Earthquakes	48	(7)
1983	Team America	23	(0)
1983–1984	Buffalo Stallions (indoor)	12	(2)
1984	Tulsa Roughnecks	1	(0)
1984–1985	Fort Lauderdale Sun	?	(12)

International career
1983	United States	1	(0)
- * Club domestic league appearances and goals

Tony Crescitelli (born January 11, 1957, in Altavilla Irpina, Italy) is a retired Italian-American soccer forward who spent six seasons in the North American Soccer League and earned one cap with the U.S. national team in 1983.

== Youth ==
Crescitelli was born in Italy and immigrated to the United States with his family when he was 11. He settled in Long Beach, New York and attended North Adams State College where he played Division III NCAA soccer from 1975 to 1978. He was a prolific scorer over his four season with Mohawks. He still holds both the school and NCAA Division III records for career goals per game (1.98 per game) and career goals (132 in 62 games).

== Professional ==
At this time, the North American Soccer League held a two-part draft. Cresctelli was initially drafted by the Rochester Lancers in the first part of the 1979 draft, but he refused to sign with the team after it offered him a $6,500 per year contract. The Washington Diplomats then selected him in the second half of the draft. signed Crescitelli in 1979. He played only a handful of games for the team his first season, scoring no goals and assisting on only two. In 1980, he came on strong, scoring 15 goals in 19 games. At the end of the season, the Diplomats folded and the San Jose Earthquakes took Crescitelli in the dispersal draft but he failed to replicate his goal-scoring feats in California. In the fall of 1982, the Earthquakes entered the Major Indoor Soccer League for the winter indoor season. In 1983, he signed with Team America. In 1983, the U.S. Soccer Federation attempted to create a more successful U.S. national team by entering the team into the NASL as a franchise. However, the team stumbled to a 10–20 record and the bottom of the league standings and USSF pulled the national team from the NASL at the end of the season. While most of the Team America players returned to their original teams, Crescitelli signed with the Tulsa Roughnecks on May 8, 1984, and played the first half of the last NASL season with them. The Roughnecks released him mid-season and he signed with the Fort Lauderdale Sun of the United Soccer League. He scored ten goals through the remainder of the season as the Sun took the league title. The league collapsed six games into the 1985 season and Crescitelli moved north where he played in the amateur Northern Virginia Soccer League. He also played 12 games for the Buffalo Stallions of Major Indoor Soccer League in 1983-84 before signing with the Fort Lauderdale Sun.

== National team ==
Crescitelli earned a single cap with the U.S. national team in the only U.S. game in 1983, a 2–0 victory over Haiti. Crescitelli did not score and was subbed out for Sonny Askew.

Massachusetts College of Liberal Arts inducted Crescitelli into its Hall of Fame in 1998, the same year he completed his degree.

== Family ==
Currently, Crescitelli lives on Long Island, New York and teaches Physical Education at Robert H. Goddard Junior High School. Tony Crescitelli and his wife Rosemarie have 2 children: Michael and Brandon
