= Minnesota Strikers =

Defunct American soccer club

- Club logotype showing a map of Minnesota and a soccer ball
- Full name: Minnesota Strikers
- Nickname: Strikers
- Founded: 1984 (Previously Fort Lauderdale Strikers)
- Dissolved: 1988 (rebranded to Fort Lauderdale Strikers)
- Stadium: Hubert H. Humphrey Metrodome; Met Center
- Capacity: 62,000; 15,000
- Coach: David Chadwick 1984 NASL; Alan Merrick1984–88 MISL
- League: North American Soccer League; Major Indoor Soccer League
Home colors	Away colors

The Minnesota Strikers were an American soccer team that competed in the North American Soccer League (NASL) for the 1984 season and in the Major Indoor Soccer League from 1984 through 1988. The team was based in Minneapolis/St. Paul metropolitan area and played their outdoor home games at the Met Center and the Hubert H. Humphrey Metrodome for indoor games. Founded in 1967 as the Washington Darts and playing in Miami as the Gatos and the Toros before playing seven season as the Fort Lauderdale Strikers the team left Florida following the 1983 North American Soccer League season. After the 1987–88 season and playing four seasons in the MISL the team ceased operations.

== History ==
=== Origins and 1984 NASL season ===
Founded in 1963 as the amateur club Washington Britannica and eventually rebranding as the Washington Darts, the team joined the North American Soccer League in 1970 after playing three seasons in the American Soccer League and winning two consecutive ASL championships. After the 1970 season, the team was sold to John Bilotta, former part owner of the Rochester Lancers, and Arthur Bant a hotel owner, who relocated and rebranded as the team as the Miami Gatos. After one season, the team was sold to a group of 25 local business leaders including Miami Dolphins owner Joe Robbie and his wife Elizabeth and renamed the Toros. In December 1976 and after five seasons in Miami, the team announced it was moving to Fort Lauderdale. Following the conclusion of the 1983 outdoor season season long rumors that the team was looking to move were confirmed when General Manager Tim Robbie met with officials in Minneapolis On November 30, 1983, team owner Elizabeth Robbie, Minnesota Governor Rudy Perpich, and NASL president Howard Samuels officially announced the team was moving and indicated the team had lost around $1 million in the last year.

The Strikers played their first game on the road against the Tampa Bay Rowdies, their former cross-state rivals in the Florida Derby, winning a game decided by a shootout. The team played its first home game at Metrodome on May 12, 1984, defeating the Chicago Sting 3-2. The Strikers ended the season with a record of fourteen wins and ten losses, tied for best record in the league. However, NASL rules awarded six points for a win, four for a shootout win, and one point for each goal scored during regulation up to three per game. This resulted in four other teams earning more than the 115 points the Strikers had for the season. This put the Strikers in third place of the Western Division and missing the playoffs. Prior to Soccer Bowl '84, the team announced head coach David Chadwick, who had moved with the team from Fort Lauderdale, would not return and hired Alan Merrick as his replacement.

=== Major Indoor Soccer League 1984 - 1988 ===
On August 28, 1984, along with three other NASL team, the Strikers joined the Major Indoor Soccer League for the 1984–85 season. Finishing the season with a record of twenty-four wins and twenty-four losses, the Strikers qualified for the playoffs as a wildcard. After defeating the Wichita Wings two games to one in the Wildcard Series, the Strikers beat the Las Vegas Americans in the Quarterfinals three games to one. The May 12, 1984, game four of the Semifinals against the San Diego Sockers ended in a tie and was won by the Sockers in a shootout, resulting in a three game to one series victory for San Diego. However, the Strikers protested that Sockers player Jacques LaDouceur who scored a goal during the shootout was ineligible. The next day, MISL Commissioner Francis Dale ruled in the Strikers favor and awarded the game to Minnesota, resulting in a two games all series tie. In the fifth game of the series, San Diego defeated the Strikers seven goals to none. The Strikers finished the 1985–86 Major Indoor Soccer League season with a record of twenty-six wins and twenty-two losses and second place in the Eastern Division. Minnesota defeated the Dallas Sidekicks in the first round of the playoffs three games to one and the Cleveland Force in the Division Finals, also three game to one, to earn a spot in the Championship Series. After trailing the best of seven series against the Sockers three games to one, the Strikers were able to tie the series at three games a piece. However, San Diego was able to capture their fifth straight indoor title with a 5-3 victory over Minnesota on May 27, 1986. The Strikers finished the 1986–87 season with a record of twenty six wins and twenty six losses, in fourth place of the Eastern Division and qualifying for the playoffs. Meeting Cleveland in the first round of the playoffs, the Force defeated the Strikers three games to two.

The team's final season was the 1987–88 Major Indoor Soccer League season. The Strikers finished in first place of the Eastern Division with a record of thirty-one wins and twenty-five losses. A fight broke out with less than two minutes remaining in the second game of the Division Semifinals against the Baltimore Blast which resulted in players from both teams being ejected. The Strikers went on to defeat the Blast three games to one in the series. Facing the Cleveland Force in the Division Finals, the Strikers lost the series four games to one. On June 22, 1988, Executive Vice President Tim Robbie announced that his family had been looking to sell the team for two years but had not been able to find a buyer and therefore, owners Joe and Elizabeth Robbie had decided to terminate the franchise rather than post a $400,000 letter of credit with the league.

== Year-by-year ==
Year	Division	League	Reg. season	Playoffs	Open Cup	Avg. Attend.
1984	1	NASL	3rd, Western	did not qualify	did not enter	14,262
1984–85	N/A	MISL	4th, Eastern	Semifinals	N/A	4,809
1985–86	N/A	MISL	2nd, Eastern	Runners-up	N/A	6,503
1986–87	N/A	MISL	4th, Eastern	Division Semifinals	N/A	6,977
1987–88	N/A	MISL	1st, Eastern	Division Finals	N/A	5,930

== International Friendlies ==
Date	Visitor	Score	Host	Venue	Location	Attendance
May 23, 1984	(Netherlands) AFC Ajax	4–2	(United States) Minnesota Strikers	Metrodome	Minneapolis, Minnesota	6,079
June 13, 1984	(Scotland) Glasgow Rangers	2–5	(United States) Minnesota Strikers	Metrodome	Minneapolis, Minnesota	6,866

== Honors ==
Championships
- 1985–86 -runners up

Division titles

- 1987–88 Eastern Division

U.S. Soccer Hall of Fame

- 2003 Joe and Elizabeth Robbie, Alan Willey

Canadian Soccer Hall of Fame

- 2001 Tino Lettieri
- 2002 Mike Sweeney
- 2004 Bob Bolitho
- 2008 John McGrane

Indoor Soccer Hall of Fame

- 2019 Hector Marinaro

MISL All-Star Game participants

- 1987 Gary Etherington, Tino Lettieri, Thompson Usiyan
- 1988 David Byrne, Steve Kinsey, Hector Marinaro

Newcomer of the Year

- 1986–87 Steve Kinsey

League Leading Goal Scorer

- 1987–88 Hector Marinaro (58 goals)

League Leading Goaltender

- 1986–87 Tino Lettieri (GAA: 3.38)

All-League First Team Selections

- 1984 Ray Hudson

All-League Second Team Selections

- 1984 Dwight Lodeweges & Alan Willey
- 1986–87 Tino Lettieri

All-League Honorable Mentions

- 1984 Barry Wallace

== 1984 (NASL) ==
Ricardo Alonso (Argentina) , John Bain (Scotland) , Bob Bolitho (Canada) , Ben Collins (United States) , Bill Crook (United States) , Peter Daniel (England) , Gary Etherington (United States) (England) , Ken Fogarty (England) , Jan Goossens (Netherlands) , Ray Hudson (England) , Godfrey Ingram (England) , Mike Jeffries (United States) , Brian Kidd (England) , Tino Lettieri (Canada) , Terry Leiendecker (United States) , Dwight Lodeweges (Canada) (Netherlands) , John McGrane (Canada) , Robert Meschbach (Canada) , Bruce Miller (Canada) , Paul Price (England) , Thomas Rongen (Netherlands) , Craig Scarpelli (United States) , Carl Strong (United States) , Barry Wallace (England) , Alan Willey (England)

== 1984–85 (MISL) ==
Ricardo Alonso (Argentina) , John Bain (Scotland) , Ben Collins (United States) , Bill Crook (United States) , Chris Dangerfield (England) , Drago Dumbović (Socialist Federal Republic of Yugoslavia) , Gary Etherington (United States) (England) , Ken Fogarty (England) , Jan Goossens (Netherlands) , Ray Hudson (England) , Mike Jeffries (United States) , Matt Kennedy (United States) , Tino Lettieri (Canada) , Steve Litt (England) , Dwight Lodeweges (Canada) (Netherlands) , John McGrane (Canada) , Bruce Miller (Canada) , Thomas Rongen (Netherlands) , Craig Scarpelli (United States) , Gregg Thompson (United States) , Thompson Usiyan (Nigeria) , Barry Wallace (England) , Alan Willey (England)

== 1985–86 (MISL) ==
Tony Bono (United States) , David Byrne (England) , Dan Canter (United States) , Stan Cummins (England) , Chris Dangerfield (England) , Drago Dumbović (Socialist Federal Republic of Yugoslavia) , Gary Etherington (United States) (England) , Ken Fogarty (England) , Jan Goossens (Netherlands) , Ray Hudson (England) , Bill Irwin (Northern Ireland) , Mike Jeffries (United States) , Matt Kennedy (United States) , Tasso Koutsoukos (Canada) , Tino Lettieri (Canada) , Dwight Lodeweges (Canada) (Netherlands) , Bruce Miller (Canada) , Kazbek Tambi (United States) , Gregg Thompson (United States) , Thompson Usiyan (Nigeria) , Alan Willey (England)

== 1986–87 (MISL) ==
Tony Bono (United States) , David Byrne (England) , Dan Canter (United States) , Stan Cummins (England) , Chris Dangerfield (England) , Enzo Di Pede (Canada) , Helmut Dudek (West Germany) , Gary Etherington (United States) (England) , Ken Fogarty (England) , Ray Hudson (England) , Greg Ion (Canada) , Mike Jeffries (United States) , Matt Kennedy (United States) , Steve Kinsey (England) , Tasso Koutsoukos (Canada) , Tino Lettieri (Canada) , Dwight Lodeweges (Canada) (Netherlands) , Hector Marinaro (Canada) , John O'Hara (United States) , Gregg Thompson (United States) , Thompson Usiyan (Nigeria) , Alan Willey (England) ; Elizabeth Robbie, President; Chris Wright, General Manager, Tim Robbie, Executive Vice President; Alan Merrick, Head Coach; Bruce Miller, Assistant Coach.

== 1987-88 (MISL) ==
Jerry Adzic (Socialist Federal Republic of Yugoslavia) , Tony Bono (United States) , Alex Bunbury (Canada) , David Byrne (England) , Stan Cummins (England) , Chris Dangerfield (England) , Gary Etherington (United States) (England) , George Gelnovatch (United States) , Tom Gleason (United States) , Tim Harris (United States) , Ray Hudson (England) , Steve Kinsey (England) , Tino Lettieri (Canada) , Dwight Lodeweges (Canada) (Netherlands) , Hector Marinaro (Canada) , John O'Hara (United States) , Neill Roberts (South Africa) , Troy Snyder (United States) , Mike Sweeney (Canada) , Gregg Thompson (United States) , Alan Willey (England) ; Elizabeth Robbie, President; Chris Wright, General Manager, Tim Robbie, Executive Vice President; Alan Merrick, Head Coach; Bruce Miller, Assistant Coach.

== NASL coach ==
- David Chadwick 1984

== Coach (MISL) ==
- Alan Merrick (1984–88)

== Strikers NASL draft ==
1984

Round	Player	School
1	Greg Kennedy	Indiana
2	Ronil Dufrene	Florida International
3	David McDaniel	Duke

== Strikers MISL drafts ==
1985

Round	Player	School
1	Paul DiBernardo	Indiana University
2	Peter Sawkins	Yale University
3	Tony Bono	Drexel University
4	Bruce Bellinger	Southern Illinois-Edwardsville

1986

Round	Player	School
2	Peter Smith	University of Tampa
3	Paul Schojan	Rochester Institute of Technology
4	Andy Pantason	University of Connecticut
4	Tony Scheuerman	Stillwater High School

1987

Round	Player	School
1	Brent Goulet	Warner Pacific University
3	George Gelnovatch	University of Virginia
4	Troy Snyder	Penn State University

== Media ==
=== Radio ===
- 1984 (NASL) KRSI-950 AM
- 1984–85 (MISL) WWTC-1280 AM
- 1987–88 (MISL) KSNE-1280 AM

=== Television ===
- 1984 (NASL) KITN 29

== See also ==
- Washington Darts 1970–71
- Miami Gatos 1972
- Miami Toros 1973–76
- Fort Lauderdale Strikers 1977–83
- 1984 Minnesota Strikers season
- Minnesota Kicks
- Minnesota Thunder
- Minnesota United FC
