= Met Center =

Arena in Bloomington, Minnesota

- Interactive map of Met Center
- Former names: Metropolitan Sports Center (1967–1982)
- Location: 7901 Cedar Avenue South; Bloomington, Minnesota 55420
- Coordinates: 44°51′30″N 93°14′24″W
- Owner: Metropolitan Sports Facilities Commission
- Operator: Metropolitan Sports Facilities Commission
- Capacity: 16,000 (basketball); 15,784 (ice hockey)

Construction
- Groundbreaking: October 3, 1966
- Opened: October 21, 1967
- Closed: April 13, 1993
- Demolished: December 13, 1994
- Cost: US$5.8 million; (US$56 million in 2025 dollars)
- Architects: Pattee Architects, Inc.
- Structural engineer: K.M. Clark Engineering Co.
- Services engineers: Brush & Morrow
- General contractor: McNulty Construction Company

Tenants
- Minnesota North Stars (NHL) (1967–1993); Minnesota Muskies (ABA) (1967–1968); Minnesota Pipers (ABA) (1968–1969); Minnesota Buckskins (WTT) (1974); Minnesota Fillies (WBL) (1978–1980); Minnesota Kicks (NASL) (1979–1981); Minnesota Strikers (MISL) (1984–1988)

The Met Center was an indoor arena located in Bloomington, Minnesota, United States, a suburb of Minneapolis. Completed in 1967 by Minnesota Ice just to the north of Metropolitan Stadium, the arena had a seating capacity of 15,784. It was the home of the Minnesota North Stars of the National Hockey League (NHL) from 1967 to 1993. For its first 15 years, its official name was the Metropolitan Sports Center; the more familiar shorter name was adopted in 1982.

The Met's other tenants included the ABA's Minnesota Muskies, which played just one season before moving to Miami for the 1968–69 season. The league responded by moving the defending champion Pittsburgh Pipers to Bloomington, but the Pipers left to return to Pittsburgh after the season. The NASL's Minnesota Kicks played two indoor seasons at the Met from 1979 to 1981. The Minnesota Strikers of the Major Soccer League (MSL) played indoor soccer at the Met Center from 1984 to 1988. The Boys' High School Hockey Tournament was also held there from 1969 to 1975.

The arena also held entertainment-related shows, including the first performance of Sesame Street Live in September 1980.

== History ==
The Met Center was considered to be one of the finest arenas in the NHL for many years. Among NHL players, the Met was known for its fast ice and good lighting. Players also had much praise for the locker rooms and training facilities. Fans gave the arena's sightlines very high marks as well. The Met never boasted fancy amenities, and had cramped concourses and very few frills compared to modern arenas (though some luxury suites were added in the 1980s). As a sports facility, it could best be described as utilitarian, a theme which repeated itself in most Minnesota sports facilities built before 1988 (such as Metropolitan Stadium and the Hubert H. Humphrey Metrodome). Like the Metrodome, the Met Center was heavily utilized as a Minnesota sports venue, hosting various high school hockey and basketball events over the course of its lifetime. The North Stars turned down a chance to move to the new Target Center upon its opening in 1990 due to conflicting soft drink rights (the Met Center was served by Pepsi whereas the Target Center's pouring rights belonged to Coca-Cola).

After the North Stars moved to Dallas, Texas, in 1993 and became the Dallas Stars, the Met Center was demolished on December 13, 1994, in a series of three controlled implosions. The series of implosions was required after the initial detonation (which was intended to be the only one) failed spectacularly to bring down the building on live television. The NHL returned to Minnesota in 2000 when the expansion Minnesota Wild began play at Grand Casino Arena in St. Paul. Meanwhile, the Harlem Globetrotters, an annual visitor to the Met Center, moved on, as had a large portion of Met Center's concert business, to Target Center.

For several years after the arena was demolished, the property served as an overflow lot for the Mall of America. In 2004, an IKEA store opened on the west end of the property, and the new American Boulevard was rerouted through the east end of the property. The remainder of the site is planned long-term to become the site of Mall of America Phase II, of which the IKEA would be an anchor store.

== Notable events ==
- The only fatality in NHL history occurred at the Met Center on January 13, 1968, when Bill Masterton of the hometown North Stars suffered a deadly head injury in a game versus the Oakland Seals.
- Elvis Presley opened his 1971 tour of the USA on November 5, 1971.
- 25th National Hockey League All-Star Game on January 25, 1972
- Led Zeppelin started their 10th North American tour at the Met Center on 18 January 1975, after two dates of warming up in Europe the week before.
- Elvis performed his penultimate Twin Cities concert on October 17, 1976.
- Filming location for Ice Castles.
- The first ever Sesame Street Live show debuted in September 1980.
- 1981 Stanley Cup Final
- 1991 Stanley Cup Final
- Four Grateful Dead concerts between October 1973 and April 1989.
- Jimi Hendrix performed the longest version of his hit "Red House" on 1 November 1968.
- Ozzy Osbourne with Randy Rhoads performed on January 15, 1982.
- Prince performed on his Controversy Tour on March 7, 1982, his 1999 Tour on March 15, 1983, and his Lovesexy Tour on September 14–15, 1988.
- Michael Jackson performed three consecutive sold-out shows in front of 50,662 people at the Met Center, during his Bad World Tour on May 4–6, 1988.
- Megadeth performed on 25 February 1988.
- Bon Jovi performed on April 4 and August 1, 1989, as part of their New Jersey Syndicate Tour.
- Metallica performed on April 24, 1989, during their "Damaged Justice" tour.
- Janet Jackson filmed the music video for "Black Cat" on April 5, 1990.
- MC Hammer performed on September 23, 1990, as part of his Please Hammer Don't Hurt 'Em World Tour.
- Frank Sinatra performed his final Minnesota show just ahead of Super Bowl XXVI, January 24, 1992.
- Filming location for the movie The Mighty Ducks featuring Emilio Estevez on February 29, 1992
- Filming location for the movie Untamed Heart featuring Marisa Tomei and Christian Slater on April 24, 1992

Preceded by first arena	Home of the Minnesota North Stars; 1967–1993	Succeeded by Reunion Arena (as Dallas Stars)
Preceded by Boston Garden	Host of the NHL All-Star Game; 1972	Succeeded by Madison Square Garden
