= Alan Merrick =

Soccer player (born 1950)

Personal information
- Full name: Alan Ronald Merrick
- Date of birth: June 20, 1950 (age 76)
- Place of birth: Selly Oak, Birmingham, England
- Position: Defender

Senior career*
Years	Team	Apps	(Gls)
1968–1975	West Bromwich Albion	131	(5)
1975	→ Peterborough (loan)	5	(0)
1976–1979	Minnesota Kicks	103	(4)
1979–1980	Pittsburgh Spirit (indoor)	1	(0)
1980	Los Angeles Aztecs	22	(2)
1981	San Jose Earthquakes	12	(0)
1981	Minnesota Kicks	12	(2)
1982	Toronto Blizzard	30	(5)
1983	Team America	18	(0)

International career
1968	England U18	3	(0)
1983	United States	1	(0)

Managerial career
- 1984–1988: Minnesota Strikers
- * Club domestic league appearances and goals

Alan Ronald Merrick (born June 20, 1950) is a retired professional soccer player who played as a defender in England, the North American Soccer League and the Major Indoor Soccer League. Born in England, and a former England youth international, he played for the United States national team.

== Club career ==
Merrick was born in Selly Oak, Birmingham, but grew up in North Warwickshire, where he attended Water Orton Junior School and Coleshill Grammar School. He joined West Bromwich Albion in July 1966, turning professional in August 1967. He made his senior debut in September 1968 in a League Cup tie against Peterborough United and in the same year won three England youth caps. In 1975 the team loaned Merrick to second division club Peterborough. At the end of the season, Merrick moved to the USA where he signed with the Minnesota Kicks of the North American Soccer League. Merrick remained with the Kicks through the 1979 season when he moved to the Los Angeles Aztecs. Merrick moved again at the end of the season, to the San Jose Earthquakes for the 1981 season. However, after twelve games, the Earthquakes traded Merrick to the Minnesota Kicks. At the end of the 1981 season, the Kicks traded Merrick to the Toronto Blizzard for the 1982 season. In 1983, the U.S. Soccer Federation, in coordination with the NASL, entered the U.S. national team, known as Team America, into the NASL as a league franchise. The team drew on U.S. citizens playing in the NASL, Major Indoor Soccer League and American Soccer League. Merrick left the Blizzard and signed with Team America. When Team America finished the 1983 season with a 10–20 record, the worst in the NASL, USSF withdrew the team from the league.

== International career ==
In 1968, Merrick played three times for the England national under-18 football team at the Junior World Cup Tournament in the South of France against Bulgaria, Russia and the Netherlands.

On April 8, 1983, Merrick earned one cap with the U.S. national team in a 2–0 victory over Haiti. He started the game, but subbed out for Erhardt Kapp in the second half.

== Coaching career ==
In 1983, Merrick retired from playing and joined the coaching ranks with the Minnesota Strikers. At the time, the Strikers played in the NASL, but after the collapse of the league in 1984, the Strikers moved to Major Indoor Soccer League. Merrick continued to coach them through the 1987–1988 season. He is the head coach of the University of Minnesota men's club team. Additionally, he continues to train coaches and young players through his Minneapolis-based academy. In April 2012, Merrick was named head coach of the Eagan High School boys soccer team.
