= 1975 San Jose Earthquakes season =

San Jose Earthquakes
1975 season
- Coach: Momcilo Gavric
- Stadium: Spartan Stadium
- NASL: Division: 5th Overall: 17th
- NASL Playoffs: Did not qualify
- National Challenge Cup: Did not enter
- Top goalscorer: Ilija Mitic (14)
- Average home league attendance: 17,927

The 1975 San Jose Earthquakes season was the team's second in the North American Soccer League. They finished in fifth place in the Pacific Division.

== Squad ==
The 1975 squad

Note: Flags indicate national team as defined under FIFA eligibility rules; some limited exceptions apply. Players may hold more than one non-FIFA nationality.

No.	Pos.	Nation	Player
1	GK	USA	Mike Ivanow
1	GK	YUG	Mirko Stojanovic
2	DF	USA	Buzz Demling
3	DF	ENG	Laurie Calloway
4	DF	USA	Mark Demling
5	DF	YUG	Momcilo Gavric
6	FW	USA	Mani Hernandez
7	FW	JAM	Art Welch
8	MF	SCO	Johnny Moore
9	FW	USA	Dan Counce
10	FW	ENG	Paul Child
11	MF	USA	Boris Bandov

No.	Pos.	Nation	Player
12	DF	ENG	Terry Lees
13	MF	SCO	Davie Kemp
14	FW	USA	Archie Roboostoff
15	MF	YUG	Ilija Mitic
15	FW	CRC	William Quiros
16	DF	ENG	Derek Craig
16	MF	POL	Zenon Zaczynski
17	FW	SCO	Jimmy Johnstone
18	FW	USA	Jerry Kazarian
20	MF	USA	Jim Zylker
21	GK	USA	Gary St. Clair

== Competitions ==
=== NASL ===
==== Season ====
Date	Opponent	Venue	Result	Scorers
April 18, 1975	Los Angeles Aztecs	H	1–2	Child
May 2, 1975	St. Louis Stars	H	2–1	Mitic (2)
May 10, 1975	Vancouver Whitecaps	H	1–2	Child
May 16, 1975	San Antonio Thunder	A	2–1	Roboostoff, Bandov
May 18, 1975	Denver Dynamos	A	1–2	
May 23, 1975	Chicago Sting	A	2–2*	Craig, Moore
May 25, 1975	Toronto Metros-Croatia	A	2–3	Mitic, Zylker
May 31, 1975	Dallas Tornado	H	0–1	
June 6, 1975	Rochester Lancers	H	5–0	Mitic, Bandov, Child (2), Craig
June 7, 1975	Los Angeles Aztecs	A	1–5	Mitic
June 14, 1975	Portland Timbers	H	2–1	Mitic (2)
June 19, 1975	Vancouver Whitecaps	A	3–2	Roboostoff, Mitic (2)
June 21, 1975	Seattle Sounders	A	1–5	Roboostoff
June 28, 1975	Portland Timbers	H	1–2	Lees
July 12, 1975	Seattle Sounders	H	2–2*	Mitic (2)
July 19, 1975	Boston Minutemen	H	0–1	
July 23, 1975	New York Cosmos	A	1–1*	Welch
July 25, 1975	Connecticut Bicentennials	H	3–3*	Moore, Mitic, Calloway
July 29, 1975	Portland Timbers	A	2–3	Bandov (2)
August 2, 1975	Los Angeles Aztecs	H	2–1	Roboostoff, Mitic
August 7, 1975	Vancouver Whitecaps	A	0–4	
August 9, 1975	Seattle Sounders	A	2–1	Welch, Bandov

* = Shootout

==== Standings ====
Western Division	W	L	GF	GA	PT
Portland Timbers	16	6	43	27	138
Seattle Sounders	15	7	42	28	129
Los Angeles Aztecs	12	10	42	33	107
Vancouver Whitecaps	11	11	38	28	99
San Jose Earthquakes	8	14	37	48	83
