= 1976 San Jose Earthquakes season =

San Jose Earthquakes
1976 season
- Coach: Momcilo Gavric
- Stadium: Spartan Stadium
- NASL: Division: 1st Conference: 2nd Overall: 6th
- NASL Playoffs: Conference Finals
- National Challenge Cup: Did not enter
- Top goalscorer: Ilija Mitic (14)
- Average home league attendance: 19,826

The 1976 San Jose Earthquakes season was their third in the North American Soccer League, and they finished in first place in the Southern Division of the Pacific Conference. In the playoffs, they defeated the Dallas Tornado in the Conference Semifinals, 2-0 at Spartan Stadium. The Minnesota Kicks beat the Earthquakes, 3-1 in the Conference Championship played at Metropolitan Stadium in Minnesota.

== Squad ==
The 1976 squad

Note: Flags indicate national team as defined under FIFA eligibility rules; some limited exceptions apply. Players may hold more than one non-FIFA nationality.

No.	Pos.	Nation	Player
1	GK	USA	Mike Ivanow
1	GK	USA	Terry Weekes
2	DF	USA	Buzz Demling
3	DF	ENG	Laurie Calloway
4	DF	USA	Mark Demling
5	DF	YUG	Momcilo Gavric
6	FW	USA	Mani Hernandez
7	MF	POR	Antonio Simoes
8	MF	SCO	Johnny Moore
10	FW	ENG	Paul Child
11	FW	USA	Mark Liveric

No.	Pos.	Nation	Player
13	MF	SCO	Davie Kemp
14	DF	ENG	John Rowlands
15	MF	YUG	Ilija Mitic
17	FW	YUG	George Sorgic
18	MF	HUN	Tibor Molnar
19	FW	TTO	Tony Douglas
20	MF	USA	Jim Zylker
21	DF	YUG	Miro Pavlovic
22	MF	USA	Juli Veee
24	GK	SCO	Mike Hewitt

== Competitions ==
=== NASL ===
==== Season ====
Date	Opponent	Venue	Result	Scorers
April 17, 1976	Los Angeles Aztecs	H	2–1	Child, Liveric
April 24, 1976	Minnesota Kicks	H	4–2	Liveric, Sorgic, Mitic (2)
May 1, 1976	San Diego Jaws	H	0–1	
May 2, 1976	Dallas Tornado	A	1–3	Sorgic
May 8, 1976	St. Louis Stars	A	3–0	Child, Liveric, Mitic
May 9, 1976	Minnesota Kicks	A	1–4	Mitic
May 16, 1976	Vancouver Whitecaps	H	2–0	Sorgic (2)
June 4, 1976	Seattle Sounders	A	2–1	Mitic, Child
June 6, 1976	San Antonio Thunder	H	0–3	
June 11, 1976	Washington Diplomats	A	1–2	Mitic
June 13, 1976	Toronto Metros-Croatia	A	0–0*	
June 20, 1976	Seattle Sounders	H	2–1	Child, Mitic
June 25, 1976	Portland Timbers	A	0–1	
June 27, 1976	Dallas Tornado	H	4–0	Child (2), Liveric (2)
July 3, 1976	Portland Timbers	H	3–0	B. Demling, Child (2)
July 7, 1976	Vancouver Whitecaps	A	1–0	Liveric
July 11, 1976	St. Louis Stars	H	6–1	Child (2), Mitic (2), Liveric (2)
July 17, 1976	Boston Minutemen	H	6–1	Child (2), Moore (2), Liveric (2)
July 23, 1976	San Diego Jaws	A	2–3	Moore, Mitic
July 25, 1976	Los Angeles Aztecs	A	1–0	Mitic
July 31, 1976	Miami Toros	H	3–0	Mitic (2), Child
August 7, 1976	New York Cosmos	H	2–1	Moore, Rowlands
August 11, 1976	Chicago Sting	A	1–1*	Mitic
August 13, 1976	San Antonio Thunder	A	0–2	

==== Playoffs ====
Date	Opponent	Venue	Result	Scorers
August 20, 1976	Dallas Tornado	H	2–0	Mitic (2)
August 25, 1976	Minnesota Kicks	A	1–3	Mitic

* = Shootout

==== Pacific Conference ====
Southern Division	W	L	GF	GA	PT
San Jose Earthquakes	14	10	47	30	123
Dallas Tornado	13	11	44	45	117
Los Angeles Aztecs	12	12	43	44	108
San Antonio Thunder	12	12	38	32	107
San Diego Jaws	9	15	29	47	82
