= 1975 NASL Indoor tournament =

Indoor soccer tournament

North American Soccer League -1975 Indoor Tournament-
NASL Indoor Tournament

Tournament details
- Host country: United States
- Dates: January 24, 1975 – March 16, 1975
- Teams: 16

Final positions
- Champions: San Jose Earthquakes (1st title)
- Runners-up: Tampa Bay Rowdies

Tournament statistics
- Matches played: 20
- Goals scored: 230 (11.5 per match)
- Top scorer: (United States) Paul Child (14 goals)
- Best player(s): (United States) Paul Child (San Jose) (Socialist Federal Republic of Yugoslavia) Gabbo Garvic (San Jose)

In early 1975, the North American Soccer League hosted its first league-wide indoor soccer tournament over the course of seven weeks. All but four NASL teams participated.

== Overview ==
Though the Dallas Tornado had won the NASL's 1971 Hoc-Soc Tournament and the Atlanta Apollos staged two league sanctioned pilot matches at the Omni in 1973, the birth of the modern game in North America can be traced to 1974, when three indoor exhibitions against the touring Soviet Red Army of Moscow club took place. The games were played on a field the size of a hockey rink, with goals 4 feet high by 16 feet wide. Much like hockey, matches were played in three 20 minute periods, allowed free substitution, and featured six man sides (five field players and a goalkeeper). The Soviets beat an outmatched NASL All-Star team 8–4 on February 7 at Toronto's Maple Leaf Gardens. The second game against the reigning champion Philadelphia Atoms on February 11, is considered by many as the watershed event of North American indoor soccer. The game stayed close into the third period, though the Red Army squad eventually pulled away 6–3. On February 13 the Russians closed out their tour with an 11–4 throttling of the St. Louis Stars in Missouri before an impressive crowd of 12,241.

In spite of the losses, and because another 11,790 curious fans packed Philadelphia's Spectrum to watch this "new" game, the NASL began considering indoor soccer's potential to increase fan interest in the sport as a whole. A month and seven days later a Spectrum crowd of 6,314 turned out to watch the Atoms defeat the New York Cosmos 5–3. With this, franchises also recognized that they could generate more revenue from players already under contract. The league hinted at having a 10-game indoor season in early 1975, but by autumn eventually scaled that plan back. The following year the NASL staged an indoor tournament: sixteen of the twenty teams participated. It was divided into four regional tournaments, with the regional winners meeting in San Francisco for the overall title in a similar format to the NCAA college basketball tournament. In the regionals, two teams would play each other, and then winners would play losers in a two-game series. The team with the best record advanced to the semifinals; in the event of teams having identical records, the side with the best total goal differential advanced out of the region. That first year the goals stayed 4 x 16 and the games remained divided into three 20 minute frames like those played against the Red Army club the previous year.

Four NASL clubs, Chicago, Denver, Portland and San Antonio did not participate in the tournament. However three of them were recently announced, expansion teams that had yet to play an outdoor season either.

The San Jose Earthquakes defeated the newly formed Tampa Bay Rowdies 8–5 in the Championship Final. Paul Child of San Jose scored seven goals in the regionals, and added another seven during the final four to lead all goal scorers. Child and teammate Gabbo Garvic shared the MVP honors.

=== Pre-1975 NASL indoor matches ===
March 19, 1971 1 (Hoc-Soc)	St. Louis Stars	1–2	Dallas Tornado	St. Louis, Missouri
8:00 PM (CST)	Leeker (6:08)	Report	Benedek (16:00); Benedek (21:00)	Stadium: St. Louis Arena; Attendance: 5,060; Referee: Larry King / Ray Puricelli

March 19, 1971 2 (Hoc-Soc)	Rochester Lancers	3–1	Washington Darts	St. Louis, Missouri
8:45 PM (CST)	Seissler (13:08); Durante (13:45); Metidieri (29:43)	Report	Kerr (5:40)	Stadium: St. Louis Arena; Attendance: 5,060; Referee: Larry King / Ray Puricelli

March 19, 1971 3 (Hoc-Soc)	St. Louis Stars	2–0	Washington Darts	St. Louis, Missouri
	Popović (15:27); Popović (29:31)	Report		Stadium: St. Louis Arena; Attendance: 5,060; Referee: Larry King / Ray Puricelli

March 19, 1971 4 (Hoc-Soc)	Dallas Tornado	3–0	Rochester Lancers	St. Louis, Missouri
	Renshaw (12:15); Renshaw (24:08); Molnár (28:11)	Report		Stadium: St. Louis Arena; Attendance: 5,060; Referee: Larry King / Ray Puricelli

May 3, 1973 5	Atlanta Apollos	8–6	Montreal Olympique	Atlanta, Georgia
	Child,,, Cocking; Hoban; Metchick; Hamlyn	Report 1 Report 2 Report 3	Bachner, Filby, Wheeler; Simmons	Stadium: The Omni; Attendance: 7,115

July 8, 1973 6	Atlanta Apollos	7–4	Dallas Tornado	Atlanta, Georgia
	Child; Child; Solem (Child); Child; Child (Kapengwe); Twellman (Child); Howe (Child)	Report 1 Report 2 Report 3	Mitić; Rote; Reynolds; Juracy (Reynolds)	Stadium: The Omni; Attendance: 4,090

February 7, 1974 7 Int'l friendly	NASL All-Stars	4–8	Red Army	Toronto, Ontario
	Siega (35:40); Strencier; Siega (Child); Smith	Report	Tellinher,,, (53:57); Dorofeov (53:01)	Stadium: Maple Leaf Gardens; Attendance: 11,535

February 11, 1974 8 Int'l friendly	Philadelphia Atoms	3–6	Red Army	Philadelphia, Pennsylvania
7:30 PM (EST)	Siega (6:21); Child (26:20); Siega (42:51)	Report	Tellinher (6:55); Babenko; Kaplichnyi (35:44); Popev (45:59); Dudarenko (53:25); Dorofeov	Stadium: Spectrum; Attendance: 11,790

February 13, 1974 9 Int'l friendly	St. Louis Stars	4–11	Red Army	St. Louis, Missouri
7:30 PM (CST)	Vaninger (4:31); Vaninger (19:48); Vaninger (35:18); Vaninger (42:15)	Report	Tellinher (4:42); Fedotov (18:23); Fedotov (18:50); Morozov (25:07); Polikarpov (33:40); Fedotov (35:52); Shlapak (36:29); Kovaleski (37:10); Fedotov (39:52); Kaplichnyi (41:39); Tellinher (46:21)	Stadium: St. Louis Arena; Attendance: 12,241; Referee: Larry King

March 18, 1974 10	Philadelphia Atoms	5–3	New York Cosmos	Philadelphia, Pennsylvania
7:30 PM (EST)	Minor (McPhee); Minor (Child); O'Neill (Minor); Child (Minor); Child (O'Neill)	Report 1 Report 2	Mahy; Fink (Rose); Siega (Menoki)	Stadium: Spectrum; Attendance: 6,314

== Map of clubs ==
Region 1 clubs Region 2 clubs Region 3 clubs Region 4 clubs

== 1975 Indoor Regional tournaments ==
=== Region 1 ===
played at Fair Park Coliseum in Dallas, Texas

January 24	Philadelphia Atoms	5–3	St. Louis Stars	3,200

Toronto Metros-Croatia	2–1	Dallas Tornado

January 26	St. Louis Stars	8–4	Toronto Metros-Croatia	3,800

Dallas Tornado	6–2	Philadelphia Atoms

Pos	Team	G	W	L	GF	GA	GD	PTS
1	Dallas Tornado	2	1	1	7	4	+3	2
2	St. Louis Stars	2	1	1	11	9	+2	2
3	Philadelphia Atoms	2	1	1	7	9	–2	2
4	Toronto Metros-Croatia	2	1	1	6	9	–3	2

*Dallas wins region on goal differential, advances to semifinals

=== Region 2 ===
played at Rochester War Memorial in Rochester, New York

February 6	New York Cosmos	6–4	Hartford Bicentennials	Attendance: 2,191

Boston Minutemen	4–3	Rochester Lancers

February 8	Hartford Bicentennials	5–3	Boston Minutemen	Attendance: 3,173

Rochester Lancers	8–7	New York Cosmos

Pos	Team	G	W	L	GF	GA	GD	PTS
1	New York Cosmos	2	1	1	13	12	+1	2
2	Hartford Bicentennials	2	1	1	9	9	0	2
3	Rochester Lancers	2	1	1	11	11	0	2
4	Boston Minutemen	2	1	1	7	8	–1	2

*New York wins region on goal differential, advances to semifinals

=== Region 3 ===
played at the Bayfront Center in St. Petersburg, Florida

February 14	Miami Toros	11–8	Baltimore Comets	Attendance: 4,437

Tampa Bay Rowdies	7–2	Washington Diplomats

February 16	Miami Toros	7–4	Washington Diplomats	Attendance: 4,032

Tampa Bay Rowdies	8–6	Baltimore Comets

Pos	Team	G	W	L	GF	GA	GD	PTS
1	Tampa Bay Rowdies	2	2	0	15	8	+7	4
2	Miami Toros	2	2	0	18	12	+6	4
3	Baltimore Comets	2	0	2	14	19	–5	0
4	Washington Diplomats	2	0	2	6	14	–8	0

*Tampa Bay wins region on goal differential, advances to semifinals

- Region 3 MVP: (United States) Ringo Cantillo (Tampa Bay) – 4 goals

=== Region 4 ===
played at the Cow Palace in Daly City, California

February 21	Vancouver Whitecaps	15–4#	Los Angeles Aztecs	Attendance: 9,223

San Jose Earthquakes	14–4#	Seattle Sounders

February 23	Los Angeles Aztecs	9–4	Seattle Sounders	Attendance: 7,232

San Jose Earthquakes	7–3	Vancouver Whitecaps

#Vancouver and San Jose won by such large margins, that the NASL and the two teams agreed to a head-to-head pairing on Feb. 28.

Pos	Team	G	W	L	GF	GA	GD	PTS
1	San Jose Earthquakes	2	2	0	21	7	+14	4
2	Vancouver Whitecaps	2	1	1	18	11	+7	2
3	Los Angeles Aztecs	2	1	1	13	19	–6	2
4	Seattle Sounders	2	0	2	8	23	–15	0

*San Jose wins region, advances to semifinals

- Region 4 MVP: (United States) Paul Child (San Jose) – 7 goals

== 1975 Indoor Final Four ==
=== Bracket ===
Semifinals
R4	San Jose Earthquakes	8
R1	Dallas Tornado	5
R3	Tampa Bay Rowdies	13
R2	New York Cosmos	5

Championship Final
R4	San Jose Earthquakes	8
R3	Tampa Bay Rowdies	5
Third place
R1	Dallas Tornado	2
R2	New York Cosmos	0

=== Semi-finals ===
played at the Cow Palace in Daly City, California

March 14	Tampa Bay Rowdies	13–5	New York Cosmos	Attendance: 9,113

San Jose Earthquakes	8–5	Dallas Tornado

=== Third-place match ===
played at the Cow Palace in Daly City, California

March 16	Dallas Tornado	2–0	New York Cosmos

=== Championship final ===
March 16, 1975
9:00 PM PDT

San Jose Earthquakes	8–5	Tampa Bay Rowdies
Roboostoff (7:10); Child (9:25); Roboostoff (14:36); Child (16:22); Roboostoff (18:38); Welch (19:38); Zaczynski (50:50); Child (52:56)	Report 1 (p. 2C); Report 2	Engerth (9:36); Hartze (25:14); Lezak (33:35); Wark (50:55); Quraishi (54:56)

Cow Palace, Daly City, California
Attendance: 8,618
Referee: (United States) Henry Landuer

1975 NASL Indoor Champions: San Jose Earthquakes
Television: CBS (tape delayed)

== Final Four awards ==
- Most Valuable Player: (United States) Paul Child (San Jose) & (Socialist Federal Republic of Yugoslavia) Gabbo Garvic (San Jose)
- All-tournament Team: (United States) Paul Child (San Jose), (United States) Doug Wark (Tampa Bay), (United States) Ilija Mitić (Dallas), (Socialist Federal Republic of Yugoslavia) Gabbo Garvic (San Jose), (United States) Mike Renshaw (Dallas), (England) Ken Cooper (Dallas)

== Final Four statistics ==
Leading scorers	Goals	Assists	Total Points
(United States) Paul Child (San Jose)	7	3	17
(United States) Doug Wark (Tampa Bay)	7	0	14
(South Africa) Bernard Hartze (Tampa Bay)	4	3	11
(United States) Ilija Mitić (Dallas)	4	1	9
(Poland) Zygmunt Lezak (Tampa Bay)	4	0	8

== Final team rankings ==
G = Games, W = Wins, L = Losses, GF = Goals For, GA = Goals Against, GD = Goal Differential

Pos	Team	G	W	L	GF	GA	GD
1	San Jose Earthquakes	4	4	0	37	17	+20
2	Tampa Bay Rowdies	4	3	1	33	21	+11
3	Dallas Tornado	4	2	2	14	12	+2
4	New York Cosmos	4	1	3	18	27	–9
5	Miami Toros	2	2	0	18	12	+6

== Non-tournament matches ==
In addition to the Region 4 and Final Four tournament games (eight contests in all), the San Jose Earthquakes also hosted two other indoor matches at the Cow Palace as tune-ups for the impending tournament. The first one was dubbed the "Calamity Cup" because it pitted the Earthquakes against the Tornado. The second was against their in-state rival, Los Angeles Aztecs. The two matches drew a combined 20,908 spectators and San Jose won both. In another match, the Rochester Lancers hosted the Toronto Metros-Croatia on March 29 in front of 2,562 fans at the Rochester War Memorial. Toronto won the game, 10–7.

=== Match reports ===
February 7, 1975 1	San Jose Earthquakes	8–6	Dallas Tornado	Daly City, California
8:00 PM (PST)	Child (2:52); Moore (23:34); Kemp (27:47); B. Demling (30:19); Moore (37:25); Child (38:04); Hernandez (45:18); Roboostoff (59:55)	Report 1 Report 2	Renshaw (5:18); Renshaw (10:11); DeLong (20:15); Mitić (26:04); Mitić (30:26); Newman (45:48)	Stadium: Cow Palace; Attendance: 11,421

February 14, 1975 2	San Jose Earthquakes	11–7	Los Angeles Aztecs	Daly City, California
8:00 PM (PST)	Moore (6:10); Child (10:51); Lopez (12:13); Moore (13:53); Roboostoff (17:26); Moore (22:49); Child (32:33); Roboostoff; Child (41:14); Moore (52:43); Child	Report 1 Report 2	Perrichon (5:46); Kazarian (25:17); Velasquez (29:22); Gay (34:05); Velasquez (46:40); Fowzi (55:27); Velasquez (56:58)	Stadium: Cow Palace; Attendance: 9,487; Referee: John Davies

March 29, 1975 3	Rochester Lancers	7–10	Toronto Metros-Croatia	Rochester, New York
8:00 PM (EST)	Ord,, (18:01); Odoi (17:13); Janduda (18:19); Cupello; Mambo	Report	Šutevsk,, Perić,, Polak, (15:51); Zekić, (33:24); Pinto (19:33)	Stadium: Rochester War Memorial; Attendance: 2,562
