= 1977 San Jose Earthquakes season =

San Jose Earthquakes
1977 season
- Coach: Momcilo Gavrić
- Stadium: Spartan Stadium
- NASL: Division: 3rd Conference: 6th Overall: 9th
- NASL Playoffs: First round
- National Challenge Cup: Did not enter
- Top goalscorer: Paul Child (13)
- Average home league attendance: 17,739
Home colors	Away colors

The 1977 San Jose Earthquakes season was the club's fourth season of existence as a franchise in the North American Soccer League, then the top-tier of American soccer. The Earthquakes finished in third place in the Southern Division of the Pacific Conference, strong enough to qualify for the playoffs.

== Squad ==
The 1977 squad

Note: Flags indicate national team as defined under FIFA eligibility rules; some limited exceptions apply. Players may hold more than one non-FIFA nationality.

No.	Pos.	Nation	Player
1	GK	USA	Paul Gizzi
2	DF	USA	Buzz Demling
3	DF	ENG	Laurie Calloway
4	DF	USA	Mark Demling
6	MF	ENG	Trevor Hockey
7	MF	POR	Antonio Simoes
8	MF	SCO	Johnny Moore
10	FW	ENG	Paul Child
11	FW	USA	Mark Liveric
12	FW	TRI	Leroy DeLeon
13	MF	SCO	Davie Kemp

No.	Pos.	Nation	Player
14	DF	ENG	John Rowlands
15	MF	YUG	Ilija Mitic
16	MF	ENG	Alan Birchenall
16	FW	YUG	Viade Zabarac
17	DF	POR	DaSilva Malta
18	MF	HUN	Tibor Molnar
19	FW	USA	Greg McKeown
21	DF	YUG	Miro Pavlovic
23	FW	ENG	Geoff Davies
24	GK	SCO	Mike Hewitt
26	GK	YUG	Borut Skulj
—	FW	SCO	John Smillie

== Competitions ==
=== NASL ===
==== Season ====
Date	Opponent	Venue	Result	Scorers
April 9, 1977	Los Angeles Aztecs	H	0–3	
April 17, 1977	Vancouver Whitecaps	A	0–2	
April 23, 1977	Seattle Sounders	H	2–0	Calloway, Davies
April 30, 1977	Dallas Tornado	A	2–2*	DeLeon, Child
May 7, 1977	Las Vegas Quicksilvers	A	0–2	
May 9, 1977	Vancouver Whitecaps	H	2–1	Child
May 14, 1977	Portland Timbers	H	3–2	DeLeon, Child, Davies
May 21, 1977	Seattle Sounders	A	1–0	Child
May 23, 1977	Washington Diplomats	H	0–0*	
May 27, 1977	St. Louis Stars	A	4–3	Davies, Child (3)
May 29, 1977	Connecticut Bicentennials	A	2–3	Calloway, Davies
June 4, 1977	Minnesota Kicks	A	0–1	
June 11, 1977	Rochester Lancers	H	1–3	Davies
June 18, 1977	Las Vegas Quicksilvers	H	2–1	Child, DeLeon
June 22, 1977	Portland Timbers	A	2–1	Birchenall (2)
June 25, 1977	Team Hawaii	A	1–3	Child
June 27, 1977	Tampa Bay Rowdies	H	1–4	Pavlovic
July 2, 1977	Toronto Metros-Croatia	H	3–0	Birchenall, Child, DeLeon
July 6, 1977	Cosmos	A	0–3	
July 9, 1977	Minnesota Kicks	H	0–0*	
July 12, 1977	Fort Lauderdale Strikers	A	0–0*	
July 16, 1977	Washington Diplomats	A	0–3	
July 24, 1977	Chicago Sting	H	1–0	Mitic
July 30, 1977	Los Angeles Aztecs	A	3–2	Child, DeLeon
August 1, 1977	Team Hawaii	H	1–0	Child
August 6, 1977	Dallas Tornado	H	4–3	Child, DeLeon, Mitic (2)

* = Shootout

=== NASL Playoffs ===
August 10, 1977 First round	Los Angeles Aztecs	2–1	San Jose Earthquakes	Los Angeles
16:00 UTC−8				Stadium: Memorial Coliseum

==== Pacific Conference ====
Southern Division	W	L	GF	GA	BP	Pts	Home	Road
Dallas Tornado	18	8	56	37	53	161	11-2	7-6
Los Angeles Aztecs	15	11	65	54	57	147	8-5	7-6
San Jose Earthquakes	14	12	37	44	35	119	9-4	5-8
Team Hawaii	11	15	45	59	40	106	7-6	4-9
Las Vegas Quicksilvers	11	15	38	44	37	103	8-5	3-10
