= 1974 San Jose Earthquakes season =

San Jose Earthquakes
1974 season
- Coach: Ivan Toplak
- Stadium: Spartan Stadium
- NASL: Division: 2nd Overall: 4th
- NASL Playoffs: Quarterfinals
- National Challenge Cup: Did not enter
- Top goalscorer: Paul Child (15)
- Average home league attendance: 16,584

The 1974 San Jose Earthquakes season marked their debut as a franchise in the North American Soccer League. They finished second in the Western Division and qualified for the playoffs.

== Squad ==
The 1974 squad Note: Flags indicate national team as defined under FIFA eligibility rules; some limited exceptions apply. Players may hold more than one non-FIFA nationality.

No.	Pos.	Nation	Player
1	GK	YUG	Mirko Stojanovic
2	DF	USA	Buzz Demling
3	DF	ENG	Laurie Calloway
4	DF	USA	Mark Demling
5	DF	YUG	Momcilo Gavric
6	FW	USA	Mani Hernandez
7	FW	JAM	Art Welch
8	MF	SCO	Johnny Moore
9	MF	USA	Dave Coskunian
9	FW	HAI	Ernie Racine

No.	Pos.	Nation	Player
10	FW	ENG	Paul Child
11	MF	USA	Boris Bandov
12	FW	YUG	Mihalj Meszaros
13	MF	SCO	Davie Kemp
14	FW	USA	Archie Roboostoff
15	MF	POL	Dieter Zajdel
16	DF	ESP	Gonzalo Pérez Vega
21	GK	USA	Mike Ivanow
—	DF	YUG	Milan Cop
—		YUG	Stevan Ostojić

== Competitions ==
=== NASL ===
==== Season ====
Date	Opponent	Venue	Result	Scorers
May 5, 1974	Vancouver Whitecaps	A	1–1*	Hernandez
May 11, 1974	Dallas Tornado	H	4–3	Roboostoff, Child (2), Hernandez
May 18, 1974	St. Louis Stars	H	2–2*	Hernandez, Perez
May 19, 1974	Seattle Sounders	A	1–3	Child
May 24, 1974	Baltimore Comets	A	2–6	Meszaros, Bandov
May 26, 1974	Rochester Lancers	A	2–1	Bandov, Child
June 1, 1974	Miami Toros	H	0–0*	
June 8, 1974	Dallas Tornado	A	0–0*	
June 16, 1974	Los Angeles Aztecs	A	2–1	Welch, Child
June 17, 1974	Denver Dynamos	A	3–5	Child (2), Roboostoff
June 22, 1974	New York Cosmos	H	2–2*	Zajdel, Moore
June 30, 1974	Seattle Sounders	H	2–2*	Child, Perez
July 3, 1974	Philadelphia Atoms	A	1–2	Coskunian
July 6, 1974	Boston Minutemen	A	2–1	Child, Bandov
July 13, 1974	Denver Dynamos	H	2–1	Roboostoff, Child
July 20, 1974	Toronto Metros	H	2–1	Welch, Roboostoff
July 26, 1974	Vancouver Whitecaps	H	3–1	Roboostoff, Child
July 28, 1974	St. Louis Stars	A	2–0	Child, Roboostoff
August 3, 1974	Washington Diplomats	H	2–3	Child, M. Demling
August 10, 1974	Los Angeles Aztecs	H	5–0	Child (2), Welch, Hernandez, Moore

==== Playoffs ====
Date	Opponent	Venue	Result	Scorers
August 14, 1974	Dallas Tornado	A	0–3	

* = Shootout

==== Standings ====
W = Wins, L = Losses, T= PK Shootout Wins, GF = Goals For, GA = Goals Against, PT= point system

6 points for a win, 3 points for a tie, 0 points for a loss, 1 point for each goal scored up to three per game.

Western Division	W	L	T	GF	GA	PT
Los Angeles Aztecs	11	7	2	41	36	110
San Jose Earthquakes	9	8	3	43	38	103
Seattle Sounders	10	7	3	37	17	101
Vancouver Whitecaps	5	11	4	29	31	70
