= 1978 San Jose Earthquakes season =

San Jose Earthquakes
1978 season
- Coach: Terry Fisher
- Stadium: Spartan Stadium
- NASL: Division: 4th Conference: 12th Overall: 23rd
- NASL Playoffs: Did not qualify
- National Challenge Cup: Did not enter
- Top goalscorer: Paul Child, Peter Ressel (8)
- Average home league attendance: 14,281

The 1978 San Jose Earthquakes season was the fifth for the franchise in the North American Soccer League. They finished in fourth place in the Western Division of the American Conference.

== Squad ==
The 1978 squad

Note: Flags indicate national team as defined under FIFA eligibility rules; some limited exceptions apply. Players may hold more than one non-FIFA nationality.

No.	Pos.	Nation	Player
1	GK	USA	Paul Gizzi
2	DF	USA	Buzz Demling
4	DF	USA	Mark Demling
5	DF	IRI	Parviz
6	DF	ENG	Ian Wood
7	MF	USA	Kevin Handlan
7	MF	YUG	Dusan Lukic
8	DF	POL	Franz Smuda
9	FW	USA	Doug Wark
10	FW	ENG	Paul Child
11	FW	CAN	Victor Kodelja
12	FW	TTO	Leroy DeLeon
13	MF	SCO	Davie Kemp
14	DF	ENG	John Rowlands

No.	Pos.	Nation	Player
14	DF	GER	Volker Fass
15	FW	YUG	Ilija Mitic
16	FW	NED	Peter Ressel
17	DF	USA	Jerry Bevans
18	DF	YUG	Dimitri Davidovic
19	MF	ENG	Les Chapman
20	FW	SCO	John Smillie
21	MF	USA	Tony Suffle
22	DF	USA	Carl Christensen
22	DF	ENG	Roger Verdi
23	FW	TTO	Leroy Spann
24	GK	SCO	Mike Hewitt
25	GK	NED	Gerrit Vooys
26	GK	USA	Sean Keohane

== Competitions ==
=== NASL ===
==== Season ====
Date	Opponent	Venue	Result	Scorers
April 2, 1978	Oakland Stompers	A	0–0*	
April 9, 1978	California Surf	H	0–0*	
April 12, 1978	San Diego Sockers	A	1–1*	Mitic
April 16, 1978	Colorado Caribous	H	2–3	Ressel, Rowlands
April 19, 1978	Houston Hurricane	A	1–1*	Child
April 22, 1978	Tampa Bay Rowdies	A	3–3*	Child, Ressel, Mitic
April 30, 1978	Seattle Sounders	H	1–0	Lukic
May 7, 1978	Tampa Bay Rowdies	H	1–0	Ressel
May 13, 1978	Seattle Sounders	A	1–3	Ressel
May 20, 1978	Portland Timbers	H	2–3	Ressel, Child
May 23, 1978	New England Tea Men	A	1–3	Child
May 27, 1978	Philadelphia Fury	A	3–1	Mitic, Lukic, Child
May 31, 1978	Rochester Lancers	A	1–2	Child
June 7, 1978	Memphis Rogues	H	0–1	
June 10, 1978	Chicago Sting	H	1–1*	Spann
June 14, 1978	Memphis Rogues	A	1–4	Mitic
June 17, 1978	Dallas Tornado	A	1–3	Ressel
June 21, 1978	New England Tea Men	H	2–5	Mitic, Kodelja
June 28, 1978	Vancouver Whitecaps	H	0–0*	
July 1, 1978	Fort Lauderdale Strikers	H	0–1	
July 7, 1978	Portland Timbers	A	0–5	
July 9, 1978	Los Angeles Aztecs	H	2–4	Ressel, Lukic
July 12, 1978	Detroit Express	A	0–10	
July 15, 1978	Washington Diplomats	H	1–5	Fass
July 19, 1978	Detroit Express	H	3–4	Child, Kodelja, Ressel
July 22, 1978	Los Angeles Aztecs	A	2–0	Chapman, Kodelja
July 26, 1978	San Diego Sockers	H	2–1	Child, Davidovic
July 30, 1978	California Surf	A	0–5	
August 3, 1978	Vancouver Whitecaps	A	0–6	
August 5, 1978	Oakland Stompers	H	2–1	Wood, Chapman

* = Shootout

==== American Conference ====
Western Division	W	L	GF	GA	BP	Pts	Home	Road
San Diego Sockers	18	12	63	56	56	164	12-3	6-9
California Surf	13	17	43	49	37	115	9-6	4-11
Oakland Stompers	12	18	34	59	31	103	7-8	5-10
San Jose Earthquakes	8	22	36	81	35	83	4-11	4-11
