= 1979 San Jose Earthquakes season =

San Jose Earthquakes
1979 season
- Coach: Peter Stubbe
- Stadium: Spartan Stadium
- NASL: Division: 4th Conference: 11th Overall: 23rd
- NASL Playoffs: Did not qualify
- National Challenge Cup: Did not enter
- Top goalscorer: Bernie Gersdorff (10)
- Average home league attendance: 15,092

The 1979 San Jose Earthquakes season was the sixth for the franchise in the North American Soccer League. They finished fourth in the Western Division of the American Conference.

== Squad ==
The 1979 squad

Note: Flags indicate national team as defined under FIFA eligibility rules; some limited exceptions apply. Players may hold more than one non-FIFA nationality.

No.	Pos.	Nation	Player
1	GK	CAN	Chris Turner
2	DF	USA	Neil Cohen
2	DF	USA	Ken McDonald
3	DF	ENG	Laurie Calloway
4	DF	GER	Dieter Versen
5	DF	GER	Willi Cryns
6	DF	ENG	Ian Wood
7	MF	DEN	Ove Flindt
8	MF	GER	Gunter Etterich
9	MF	GER	Bernie Gersdorff
10	FW	ENG	Paul Child
11	FW	DEN	Lars Jensen

No.	Pos.	Nation	Player
11	FW	NIR	Tom Armstrong
12	DF	ENG	John Rowlands
14	MF	USA	Steve Ryan
15	FW	USA	Easy Perez
16	DF	DEN	Henning Munk Jensen
17	DF	USA	Sam Bick
20	DF	USA	Charlie Kadupski
20	DF	USA	Doc Lawson
21	FW	GER	Detlef Webers
22	DF	USA	Carl Christensen
24	GK	SCO	Mike Hewitt

== Competitions ==
=== NASL ===
==== Season ====
Date	Opponent	Venue	Result	Scorers
March 31, 1979	Portland Timbers	H	3–4	Gersdorff, Child, Cohen
April 14, 1979	Edmonton Drillers	H	0–1	
April 21, 1979	San Diego Sockers	A	3–3*	Child (2), Ryan
April 28, 1979	Los Angeles Aztecs	H	1–2	Child
May 5, 1979	Vancouver Whitecaps	H	1–2	Gersdorff
May 9, 1979	Detroit Express	A	0–3	
May 12, 1979	Seattle Sounders	A	1–2	Gersdorff
May 19, 1979	Seattle Sounders	H	0–1	
May 26, 1979	Edmonton Drillers	A	2–1	Child, Lawson
June 2, 1979	Memphis Rogues	H	2–1	Etterich, Flindt
June 6, 1979	Minnesota Kicks	A	1–4	Gersdorff
June 9, 1979	Toronto Blizzard	H	2–3	Child, Gersdorff
June 13, 1979	Tampa Bay Rowdies	A	2–2*	Child, Versen
June 16, 1979	Fort Lauderdale Strikers	A	1–3	Armstrong
June 20, 1979	Portland Timbers	A	2–1	Etterich, Ryan
June 23, 1979	Chicago Sting	H	4–2	Etterich, Bick, Webers, Gersdorff
June 27, 1979	New England Tea Men	H	0–1	
June 30, 1979	Philadelphia Fury	A	1–2	Wood
July 4, 1979	Houston Hurricane	A	0–4	
July 7, 1979	Fort Lauderdale Strikers	H	1–2	Flindt
July 11, 1979	Philadelphia Fury	H	4–4*	Armstrong, Etterich, Gersdorff, Wood
July 14, 1979	Los Angeles Aztecs	A	0–0*	
July 18, 1979	Houston Hurricane	H	1–2	Gersdorff
July 21, 1979	Tulsa Roughnecks	H	3–2	Armstrong (2), Wood
July 25, 1979	Chicago Sting	A	3–2	Gersdorff (2), Child
July 29, 1979	New York Cosmos	A	0–5	
August 1, 1979	California Surf	H	0–2	
August 4, 1979	California Surf	A	1–4	Wood
August 8, 1979	Vancouver Whitecaps	A	0–1	
August 11, 1979	San Diego Sockers	H	0–6	

* = Shootout

==== American Conference ====
Western Division	W	L	GF	GA	BP	Pts	Home	Road
San Diego Sockers*	15	15	59	55	50	140	7-8	8-7
California Surf	15	15	53	56	50	140	9-6	6-9
Edmonton Drillers	8	22	43	78	40	88	7-8	1-14
San Jose Earthquakes	8	22	41	74	38	86	4-11	4-11
