= 1980 San Jose Earthquakes season =

San Jose Earthquakes
1980 season
- Coach: Bill Foulkes
- Stadium: Spartan Stadium
- NASL: Division: 4th Conference: 12th Overall: 23rd
- NASL Playoffs: Did not qualify
- National Challenge Cup: Did not enter
- Top goalscorer: Steve David (14)
- Average home league attendance: 13,169

The 1980 San Jose Earthquakes season was the franchise's seventh in the North American Soccer League. They finished fourth in the Western Division of the American Conference.

== Squad ==
The 1980 squad

Note: Flags indicate national team as defined under FIFA eligibility rules; some limited exceptions apply. Players may hold more than one non-FIFA nationality.

| No. | Pos. | Nation | Player |
|---|---|---|---|
| 1 | GK | CAN | Chris Turner |
| 2 | DF | USA | Ane Mihailovich |
| 3 | DF | USA | Mark Demling |
| 3 | DF | USA | Mike Hunter |
| 4 | MF | ENG | Colin Bell |
| 4 | MF | NED | Guus Hiddink |
| 5 | DF | GER | Willi Cryns |
| 5 | DF | YUG | Vasa Rutonjski |
| 6 | DF | ENG | Mike Czuczman |
| 7 | FW | TRI | Steve David |
| 7 | FW | SCO | Billy Hughes |
| 8 | DF | YUG | Miro Pavlovic |
| 8 | FW | SCO | Alfie Conn |
| 9 | MF | GER | Bernie Gersdorff |
| 11 | FW | NIR | George Best |
| 12 | FW | YUG | Slavko Licinar |
| 12 | MF | POR | Ibraim Silva |

| No. | Pos. | Nation | Player |
|---|---|---|---|
| 13 | DF | USA | Sandje Ivanchukov |
| 13 | DF | USA | Paul Toomey |
| 14 | MF | USA | Steve Ryan |
| 15 | FW | USA | Easy Perez |
| 16 | DF | YUG | Niki Nikolic |
| 17 | DF | USA | Sam Bick |
| 19 | FW | USA | Bill Sautter |
| 20 | DF | USA | Charlie Kadupski |
| 20 | MF | NED | Hans Kraay, Jr. |
| 21 | MF | USA | Joe Silveira |
| 22 | DF | GER | Peter Lechermann |
| 23 | FW | RSA | Andries Maseko |
| 24 | GK | SCO | Mike Hewitt |
| 25 | DF | USA | Derek Evans |
| — | FW | NIR | Tom Armstrong |
| — | FW | POR | Victor Baptista |
| — | DF | ENG | John Rowlands |

== Competitions ==
=== NASL ===
==== Season ====
| Date | Opponent | Venue | Result | Scorers |
|---|---|---|---|---|
| April 5, 1980 | Los Angeles Aztecs | A | 0–1 | |
| April 19, 1980 | Seattle Sounders | H | 0–1 | |
| April 27, 1980 | Edmonton Drillers | A | 2–4 | Maseko (2) |
| April 30, 1980 | San Diego Sockers | H | 2–3 | Sautter, Gersdorff |
| May 3, 1980 | Seattle Sounders | A | 0–4 | |
| May 10, 1980 | New England Tea Men | H | 0–0* | |
| May 15, 1980 | Edmonton Drillers | H | 1–0 | David |
| May 17, 1980 | Houston Hurricane | H | 3–0 | David (3) |
| May 24, 1980 | Portland Timbers | A | 1–2 | Silva |
| June 1, 1980 | California Surf | A | 2–3 | David, Kraay |
| June 4, 1980 | Rochester Lancers | H | 1–2 | David |
| June 7, 1980 | Vancouver Whitecaps | H | 2–0 | Pavlovic, Lechermann |
| June 11, 1980 | Detroit Express | A | 0–0* | |
| June 14, 1980 | Philadelphia Fury | H | 2–1 | Best, David |
| June 17, 1980 | Fort Lauderdale Strikers | A | 0–4 | |
| June 22, 1980 | Washington Diplomats | A | 4–5 | Licinar, David, Lechermann, Best |
| June 26, 1980 | Toronto Blizzard | A | 2–2* | Licinar, David |
| June 29, 1980 | California Surf | H | 5–1 | Licinar, Best, David, Lechermann (2) |
| July 2, 1980 | Dallas Tornado | H | 1–2 | Pavlovic |
| July 5, 1980 | New England Tea Men | A | 1–3 | David |
| July 9, 1980 | Tampa Bay Rowdies | A | 1–4 | Licinar |
| July 12, 1980 | Atlanta Chiefs | A | 2–1 | Mihailovich, David |
| July 16, 1980 | Tampa Bay Rowdies | H | 0–3 | |
| July 19, 1980 | Vancouver Whitecaps | A | 1–4 | David |
| July 26, 1980 | Minnesota Kicks | H | 1–2 | |
| July 30, 1980 | Memphis Rogues | H | 0–1 | |
| August 2, 1980 | Detroit Express | H | 3–1 | Pavlovic, David |
| August 9, 1980 | Chicago Sting | A | 1–4 | Best |
| August 12, 1980 | Memphis Rogues | A | 0–0* | |
| August 16, 1980 | Portland Timbers | H | 2–3 | Best (2) |
| August 20, 1980 | San Diego Sockers | A | 3–2 | Maseko, Best |
| August 23, 1980 | Los Angeles Aztecs | H | 1–2 | Best |

* = Shootout

==== American Conference ====
| Western Division | W | L | GF | GA | PT |
|---|---|---|---|---|---|
| Edmonton Drillers | 17 | 15 | 58 | 51 | 149 |
| California Surf | 15 | 17 | 61 | 67 | 144 |
| San Diego Sockers | 16 | 16 | 53 | 51 | 140 |
| San Jose Earthquakes | 9 | 23 | 45 | 68 | 95 |
