= Terry Fisher (soccer) =

American soccer coach

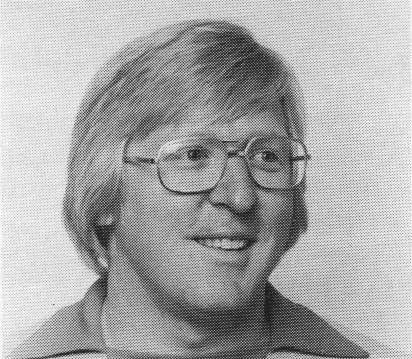
- Fisher circa 1978

Personal information
- Date of birth: September 17, 1949 (age 77)
- Place of birth: Yellow House, Pennsylvania, U.S.

College career
Years	Team	Apps	(Gls)
1967–1970	Hartwick Hawks		

Managerial career
- 1972: Whittier Poets
- 1973–1974: UCLA Bruins
- 1975–1978: Los Angeles Aztecs
- 1978–1979: San Jose Earthquakes
- 1979–1980: Detroit Lightning

Terry Fisher is an American soccer coach and executive. He served as coach of the Los Angeles Aztecs and the San Jose Earthquakes of the North American Soccer League in the 1970s. He was general manager and part-owner of several lower-division teams in the 1980s and 1990s, and has worked as a youth soccer executive since 2009.

== Early life ==
Fisher was born on September 17, 1949, in Yellow House, Pennsylvania, and grew up in the Philadelphia area.

Fisher graduated high school in 1967. That summer, Fisher toured Europe on a team of American soccer players coached by Hubert Vogelsinger, visiting nine countries over three weeks, which he says got him "hooked" on soccer. He would travel to Europe again in 1968 as an assistant for the American International Sports Exchange, a program which sponsored young athletes on European tours. Fisher says these tours allowed him to watch many soccer matches, forming his coaching techniques and inspiring his passion for the game.

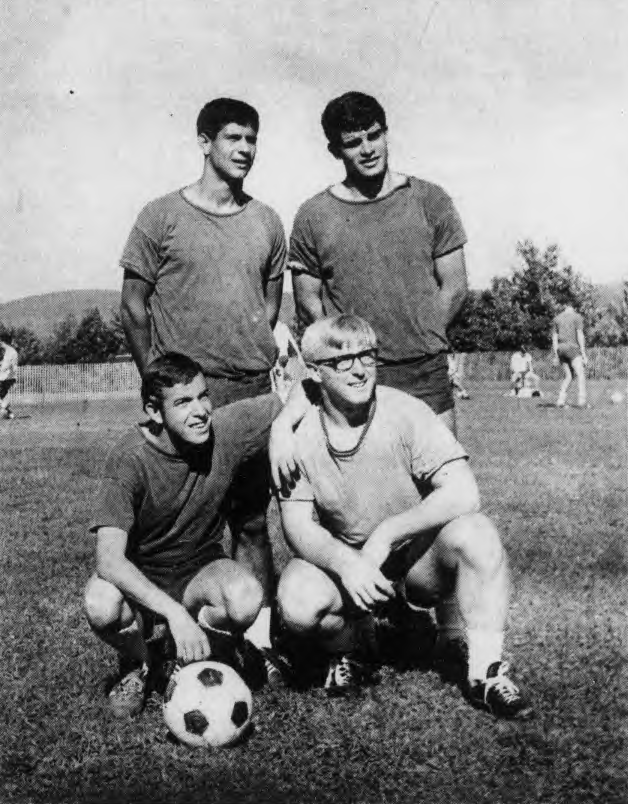
Fisher (front right) as a freshman at Hartwick College

From 1967 to 1971, he attended Hartwick College in Oneonta, New York. Fisher played on the Hartwick Hawks men's soccer team, coached by Al Miller, which advanced to the NCAA playoffs all four seasons he played. Fisher earned a Bachelor of Arts degree in education/history.

During these early years, Fisher coached at Stroudsburg High School in Pennsylvania, as well as in youth leagues in Oneonta and parts of southern California. Fisher says he learned from Dettmar Cramer to earn his United States Soccer Federation coaching license.

== Head coaching career ==
In 1972, he became head coach of the men's soccer team at Whittier College. He led the Poets to their first-ever conference championship before falling in the National Association of Intercollegiate Athletics (NAIA) playoffs. He also earned a master's degree from Whittier.

In 1973, he was hired to join the coaching staff of the Bruins men's soccer team at the University of California, Los Angeles (UCLA). Although his title was assistant coach, he took over most coaching responsibilities from head coach Dennis Storer, who was more focused on UCLA's rugby team. He was officially made head coach in the winter of 1973, and remained head coach through the 1974 season. While working at UCLA, he also took on a role as director of youth development for the Los Angeles Aztecs of the North American Soccer League (NASL).

After two years with UCLA, Fisher was named head coach of the Los Angeles Aztecs ahead of the 1975 season. At 25 years old, he was the youngest coach in the NASL. He was reportedly popular among his players, but less popular among fans, who booed his appearance at home games. Under Fisher's stewardship, the Aztecs qualified for the NASL playoffs in 1975, 1976, and 1977. However, in 1978, the Aztecs started out with 5 wins and 8 losses, including 7 losses in their first 7 home games. Fisher was publicly critical of the team's owners, saying they weren't willing to spend enough on players. The Aztecs fired Fisher on June 5, 1978.

He was then hired by the San Jose Earthquakes on June 19, after they had started 5–12 and fired their previous coach Momčilo Gavric. On July 12, 1978, Fisher's Earthquakes lost 10–0 in a road game against the Detroit Express, the largest victory margin in league history, and a game that Fisher said still stood out from his tenure in a 2008 interview. Fisher attributed the Earthquakes' woes to poor talent, and said he would place an emphasis on signing American players. However, he was unable to turn the Earthquakes around, and won just 3 of his 21 games with the club. On May 19, 1979, the Earthquakes suffered their 8th consecutive loss to start the season, as the Seattle Sounders beat them 1–0. Fisher was fired that night.

On October 2, 1979, Fisher was hired as head coach of the Detroit Lightning ahead of their inaugural 1979–80 season in the Major Indoor Soccer League. Founded in a rush, the club was marked by disorganization, and only managed to obtain a general manager, a full roster, branding, and office space in the final month before the season kicked off. The Lightning finished the regular season 15–17 and lost in the playoffs to the Wichita Wings. After owner Jerry Perenchio sustained a $1.1 million loss from the first season, he dissolved the club and sold its franchise rights to the newly formed San Francisco Fog, which hired Johnny Moore as its head coach.

== Later career ==
Fisher then went on to work as an assistant coach, first for the Houston Hurricane in 1980. Due to the club's instability (which would ultimately result in their folding after the 1980 season), he left to join the Calgary Boomers as an assistant coach in late 1980. The Boomers folded after the 1981 NASL outdoor season.

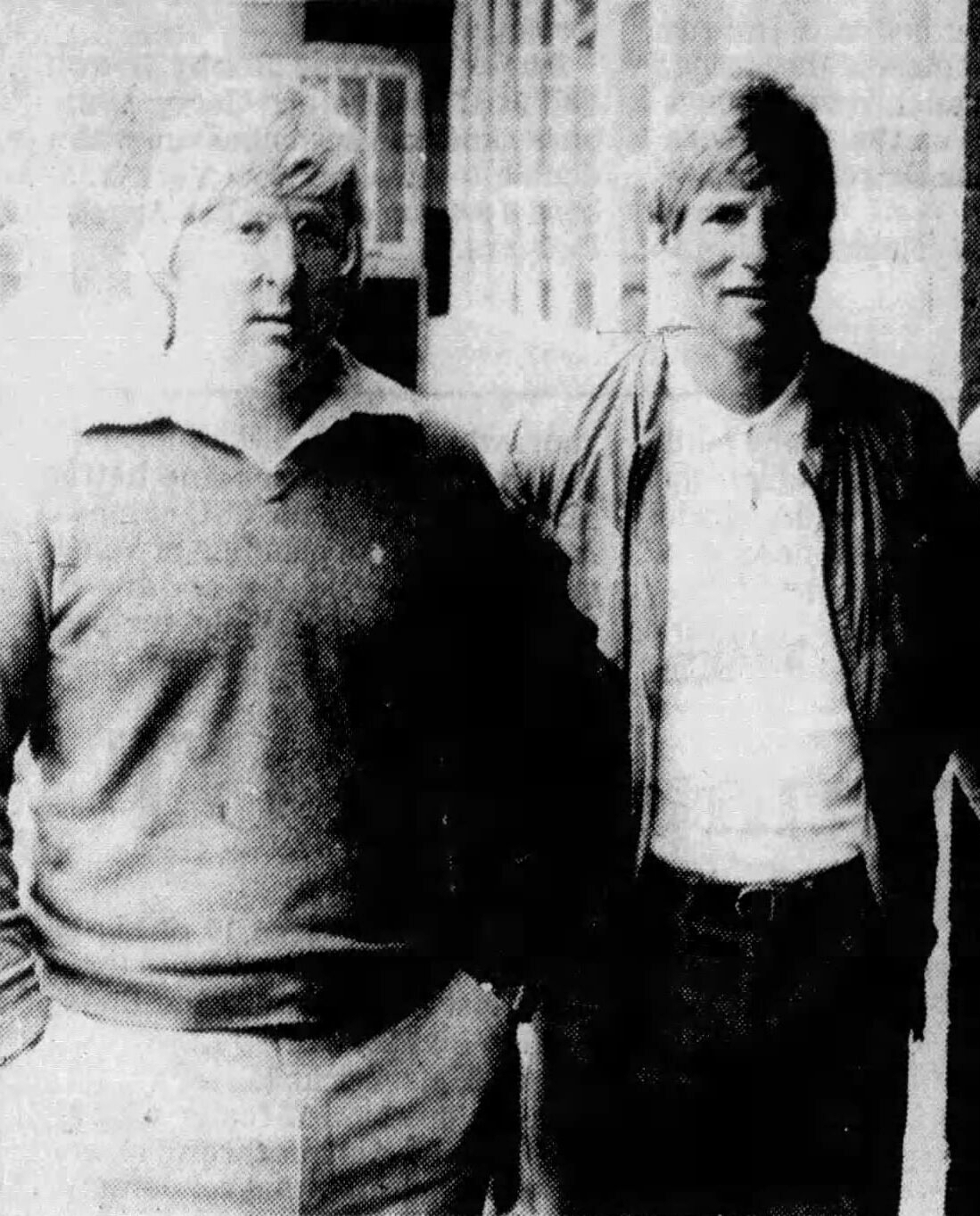
Fisher with Hubert Vogelsinger in 1982

In 1982, Fisher joined Hubert Vogelsinger to direct Puma All-Star Soccer clinics.

In early 1989, Fisher was named general manager of the newly formed San Francisco Bay Blackhawks, a semi-professional team in the Western Soccer League (WSL).

In the early 1990s, Fisher was the owner and general manager of the Palo Alto Firebirds, a club in the United States Interregional Soccer League (USISL) based in Palo Alto, California. Fisher oversaw the club as it won the USISL championship in its inaugural 1992 season.

From 1995 to 1996, Fisher worked as sponsorship director for the San Jose Clash of newly established Major League Soccer.

In January 1997, the Albuquerque Geckos were announced as a new franchise to play in the USISL D-3 Pro League, with Fisher serving as part-owner and general manager. The team had a successful first year on the pitch, winning their conference and the league playoffs, but struggled to garner fans, bringing in an average attendance of 1,200. For the 1998 season, the team moved up to the second-division A-League. They lowered their ticket prices, and Fisher said they could meet revenue goals in 1998 if their average attendance reached 3,000. However, the team finished last in their division with a 5–23 record, and failed to raise attendance. Fisher and the other owners sold the franchise to an ownership group in Sacramento in October 1998.

Fisher coached the boys soccer team at Half Moon Bay High School in Half Moon Bay, California for two years. He resigned in 2009, saying his real estate job at Coldwell Banker did not leave him with enough time to effectively coach the team. He also previously coached the Crystal Springs Uplands High School soccer team.

On June 1, 2009, Fisher was named as executive director of the Washington State Youth Soccer Association.

In June 2021, Fisher became CEO of the California State Soccer Association – South, commonly known as Cal South.

== Personal life ==
As of 1979, Fisher had a wife, Joni, and two children, Don and Rand.

In 1979, Fisher wrote and published his first book, Star-Spangled Soccer: Playing and Coaching the American Way. His second book, Indoor Soccer, was published in November 1980.

== Career statistics ==
Coaching record by team and tenure
Team	From	To	Record				
Team	From	To	P	W	D	L	Win %
Whittier Poets	1972	1972	16	11	2	3	68.8
UCLA Bruins	1973	1974	22	15	4	3	68.2
Los Angeles Aztecs	1975	June 5, 1978	92	47		45	51.1
San Jose Earthquakes	June 19, 1978	May 19, 1979	21	3		18	14.3
Detroit Lightning	October 2, 1979	1980	33	15		18	45.5
Total			184	91	6	87	49.5
