= Tony Graham (soccer) =

American soccer player

Personal information
- Date of birth: May 12, 1956 (age 70)
- Place of birth: San Francisco, California, United States
- Position: Forward

College career
Years	Team	Apps	(Gls)
- San Francisco Dons

Senior career*
Years	Team	Apps	(Gls)
1978	Oakland Stompers	13	(0)
1978–1979	Cincinnati Kids (indoor)	20	(18)
1979–1980	St. Louis Steamers (indoor)	31	(12)
1980	Columbus Magic		
1980–1981	Denver Avalanche (indoor)	7	(2)
1980–1981	Cleveland Force (indoor)	19	(1)
- * Club domestic league appearances and goals

Tony Graham is a retired professional soccer forward who spent one season in the North American Soccer League, one in the American Soccer League and three in the Major Indoor Soccer League.

Graham attended the University of San Francisco where he was a member of the men's soccer team. In 1978, Graham signed with the Oakland Stompers of the North American Soccer League. In the fall of 1978, he joined the Cincinnati Kids of the newly established Major Indoor Soccer League. In 1980, he played for the Columbus Magic of the American Soccer League. He played for two MISL teams during the 1980–1981 season, the Denver Avalanche and the Cleveland Force.
