= Lee Atack =

British-American soccer defender

Personal information
- Full name: Lee Mitchel Atack
- Date of birth: 10 January 1951 (age 75)
- Place of birth: Leeds, England
- Height: 6 ft 1 in (1.85 m)
- Position: Defender

Senior career*
| Years | Team | Apps | (Gls) |
| 1975–1976 | Los Angeles Aztecs | 12 | (0) |
| 1978 | Oakland Stompers | 24 | (0) |
| 1979 | Edmonton Drillers | 24 | (2) |
| 1980 | Golden Gate Gales | | |
| 1980–1981 | San Francisco Fog (indoor) | 16 | (1) |
- * Club domestic league appearances and goals

Lee Atack is an American soccer defender who played four seasons in the North American Soccer League and one in the Major Indoor Soccer League.

Atack attended high school in Newark, California at Newark High school, and played soccer for Coach Harold (Hal) Bodon. Following college at UCSF and San Jose State, Atack began his NASL career with the Los Angeles Aztecs in 1975. In 1978, he spent a season with the Oakland Stompers. Later in 1978, the Stompers were sold to a new ownership which moved the team to Edmonton, Alberta, Canada. Atack moved to Canada with the team, which soon became known as the Edmonton Drillers. In 1980, he moved to the Golden Gate Gales of the American Soccer League. He also played the 1980-1981 Major Indoor Soccer League season with the San Francisco Fog. Atack has two sons and a daughter
