= Len Renery =

English-American soccer player and coach

Len C. Renery
Personal information
- Date of birth: September 11, 1949 (age 77)
- Place of birth: London, England
- Position: Defender

Youth career
- 1968–1971: Columbia Lions

Senior career*
Years	Team	Apps	(Gls)
1972	New Jersey Brewers		
1973–1974	New York Cosmos	31	(1)
1975	Baltimore Comets	20	(1)
1976	San Diego Jaws	15	(0)
1977	New York Apollo	18	(1)
1978–1979	California Surf	40	(0)
1979–1980	New York Arrows (indoor)	7	(0)
1980	Detroit Lightning (indoor)	9	(4)
1980	Cleveland Cobras		
1980–1981	San Francisco Fog (indoor)	18	(3)

Managerial career
- 1985–1995: Sacred Heart Preparatory
- 1997–2007: Menlo College
- * Club domestic league appearances and goals

Len Renery is an English-American retired professional soccer defender and coach.

Renery moved to the United States when he was 13 years old, lived in Neptune Township, New Jersey and graduated from Neptune High School in 1966, where he was a varsity baseball and soccer player. In 2010, Neptune High School inducted Renery into its Athletics Hall of Fame.

After a prep year at Suffield Academy in Connecticut, Renery entered Columbia University where he played on the men's soccer team from 1968 to 1971. He was a 1969 and 1970 first-team All Ivy. He graduated in 1971 and was inducted into the Columbia University Athletics Hall of Fame in 2015.

In 1972, he played for the expansion New Jersey Brewers of the American Soccer League. He signed with the New York Cosmos of the North American Soccer League in 1973. Renery finished his career in the Major Indoor Soccer League with the San Francisco Fog in 1981.

Photos, newspaper clippings and team jerseys from his years with the ASL, NASL and MISL can be found at NASLJerseys.com.

Renery coached Sacred Heart Preparatory in Atherton, California from 1985 to 1995. In May 1996, he became head coach of the Menlo College men's team. He spent ten years at Menlo.
