= Roy Messing =

American soccer player

Personal information
- Date of birth: March 4, 1958 (age 68)
- Place of birth: Roslyn, New York, U.S.
- Position: Goalkeeper

Youth career
- 1975–78: Yale Bulldogs

Senior career*
Years	Team	Apps	(Gls)
1978	San Diego Sockers	0	(0)
1978–1979	Cincinnati Kids (indoor)	10	(0)
1979	Rochester Lancers	0	(0)
1979–1980	Hartford Hellions (indoor)	15	(0)
1980–1981	San Francisco Fog (indoor)	23	(0)
1982–1983	New York Arrows (indoor)	1	(0)
- * Club domestic league appearances and goals

Roy Messing (born March 4, 1958) is an American retired soccer goalkeeper who played in both the North American Soccer League and Major Indoor Soccer League. He is currently a Senior Managing Director at Ankura Consulting Group.

Messing, brother of Shep, played college soccer at Yale University. In 1978, Messing signed with the San Diego Sockers of the North American Soccer League. He then played for the Cincinnati Kids of the newly established Major Indoor Soccer League during the 1978-1979 indoor season. He returned to the NASL in 1979 with the Rochester Lancers. During the 1980-1981 MISL season, he played for the San Francisco Fog. However, a blow to the head led to a partially detached retina which put him out of playing for roughly a year.

Messing retired in 1988. He then attended Yale University, where he graduated with a bachelor's degree before earning an MBA from Harvard University. Messing ran a goalkeepers camp called "Messing Goalkeeper Academy" in 1988 based in Suffield, Connecticut.
