= Len Bilous =

American soccer player and coach (born 1948)

Personal information
- Date of birth: June 11, 1948 (age 78)
- Place of birth: Germany

Youth career
- 1967–1969: Temple Owls

Senior career*
Years	Team	Apps	(Gls)
- Philadelphia Spartans
1972	Delaware Wings		

Managerial career
- 1975–1978: Quinnipiac University
- 1978–1979: Cincinnati Kids
- 1979–1980: Pittsburgh Spirit
- 1980–1981: Philadelphia Fever
- * Club domestic league appearances and goals

Len Bilous (born June 11, 1948) is an American retired soccer player and coach. He played in the American Soccer League and coached for three seasons in the Major Indoor Soccer League where he was the 1979–80 MISL Coach of the Year.

Born in Germany and raised in Venezuela, Bilous attended Temple University, where he played on the men's soccer team from 1967 to 1969. After graduating from Temple, he played for the Delaware Wings in the American Soccer League. In 1972, he joined the Philadelphia Spartans. Bilous got his coaching start coaching the Princeton University Men's Freshman team in 1973 and the following year was hired to coach the NCAA Division I Quinnipiac University soccer team. In 1978, he was named the head coach of the newly established Cincinnati Kids of the Major Indoor Soccer League. In 1979, he became the head coach of the Pittsburgh Spirit and turned the team around after they had started 5–10. He was named the MISL Coach of the Year along with Pat McBride. Although Bilous took the Spirit into the playoffs, the team faced financial difficulties and spent the 1980–81 season on hiatus. In September 1980, Bilous moved to the Philadelphia Fever though was let go with five games remaining in the 1980–81 season.

Following the conclusion of his MISL coaching career, Bilous co-founded Vision Training Soccer alongside TJ Kostecky. In 2020, Bilous and Kostecky were inducted into the Ukrainian Sports Hall of Fame, which was created by the Ukrainian Sports Museum, a Horsham, Pennsylvania-based non-profit.

== Honors ==
Individual

- MISL Coach of the Year: 1979–80 (Jointly held with Pat McBride)
- Ukrainian Sports Hall of Fame: 2020
