= Denver Avalanche =

American soccer team

- Nickname(s): Avalanche
- Founded: 1980
- Dissolved: 1983
- Ground: McNichols Sports Arena; Denver, Colorado
- Capacity: 16,061
- Owner: (United States) Ron Maierhofer
- Head Coach: (Northern Ireland) Dave Clements
- League: Major Indoor Soccer League

The Denver Avalanche were an American soccer team based out of Denver, Colorado that played in the Major Indoor Soccer League from 1980 to 1982. Their home arena was McNichols Sports Arena.

== History ==
In February 1980, the Major Indoor Soccer League awarded a franchise to Ron Maierhofer, to be named the Denver Avalanche. The team's first three players, all signed the same day were Tony Graham, Chris Cattaneo and Adrian Brooks. The team's first draft pick Erhardt Kapp passed on the Avalanche and signed with the New York Cosmos of the North American Soccer League instead. The team's first game, an exhibition match, took place on November 3, 1980, a 10–4 loss to the St. Louis Steamers. Coached by Dave Clements, the Avalanche finished the regular season out of playoff contention, but in 1982, they made the playoffs only to fall to the St. Louis Steamers in the first round. Clements was named the 1982 MISL Coach of the Year.

The team entered Chapter 11 bankruptcy in 1983. The Avalanche's assets were purchased by a group led by George Best and moved to form the Tacoma Stars.

== Year-by-year ==
Year	Record	Regular season	Playoffs	Avg. attendance
1980–1981	16–24	3rd Western Division	Out of playoffs	7,699
1981–1982	19–25	4th Western Division	First Round	7,653

== Honors ==
All Star Game MVP

- 1980–1981: Adrian Brooks

Coach of the Year

- 1981–1982: Dave Clements

== Staff ==
- Coach: Dave Clements
- Assistant Coach: Peter Duerden
- Director of Player Development: Mike Ditchfield
