= Hubert Vogelsinger =

Austrian association football manager

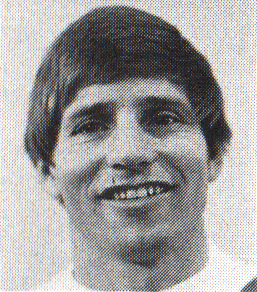
- Vogelsinger circa 1975

Personal information
- Date of birth: 1938
- Place of birth: Vienna, Austria
- Date of death: June 22, 2023 (aged 85)

Managerial career
- Years: Team
- 1966–1973: Yale Bulldogs
- 1974–1976: Boston Minutemen
- 1977: Team Hawaii
- 1978–1980: San Diego Sockers

Hubert Vogelsinger was an Austrian association football manager. He was known for his career coaching several teams in the North American Soccer League, as well as for hosting many soccer clinics and camps.

== Career ==
Vogelsinger was born in 1938 in Vienna, Austria. He played professionally in the Austrian First Division for five years.

He first came to the United States in 1961. In 1963, he played for the Boston Metros in the American Soccer League.

He had an early soccer coaching job first with Middlesex School, then with Brandeis University in 1965.

In 1965, Vogelsinger established Vogelsinger Soccer Academy, one of the first soccer camps in the United States. As of 2023, the academy is still active.

In 1966, Vogelsinger was named head coach of the Bulldogs men's soccer team at Yale University. He remained with the Bulldogs through the 1973 season, compiling a record of 38 wins, 45 losses, and 16 ties.

On January 17, 1974, Vogelsinger was named as the first head coach of the Boston Minutemen of the North American Soccer League ahead of their inaugural 1974 season. Under his leadership, the Minutemen won the Northern Division title in 1974 and 1975. In 1976, the club ran into significant financial difficulties, and sold the contracts of 8 starting players that summer. On July 8, Vogelsinger submitted his immediate resignation, citing disapproval with the state of the club and its leadership. The Minutemen would ultimately fold after the 1976 season.

Vogelsinger was then signed as head coach of the newly founded Team Hawaii in 1977. Team Hawaii faced significant struggles with travel due to the remoteness of the island compared to the rest of their NASL opponents. Vogelsinger was replaced midway through the season; Vogelsinger said he had reached a mutual understanding with the club and also mentioned an illness his wife had been suffering. He was named as a possible coach for a new NASL franchise in Indiana to begin play in 1978, but this never materialized.

He returned to coaching in 1978 with the San Diego Sockers. In his first season, the Sockers won the west division of NASL's American Conference in the regular season. They performed well in 1979 as well, finishing as the conference runner-up in the NASL playoffs. However, in 1980, San Diego got off to a weak start under Vogelsinger. On July 2, the Sockers snapped a four-game losing streak with a 3–2 overtime win over the Chicago Sting. However, his players declined to partake in a vote of confidence for him, and he was fired by the club on July 4. He was replaced by Ron Newman, who later said that Vogelsinger had put together a great roster but declined to comment on his coaching skills. Newman ultimately led the Sockers to the American Conference final in the 1980 NASL playoffs.

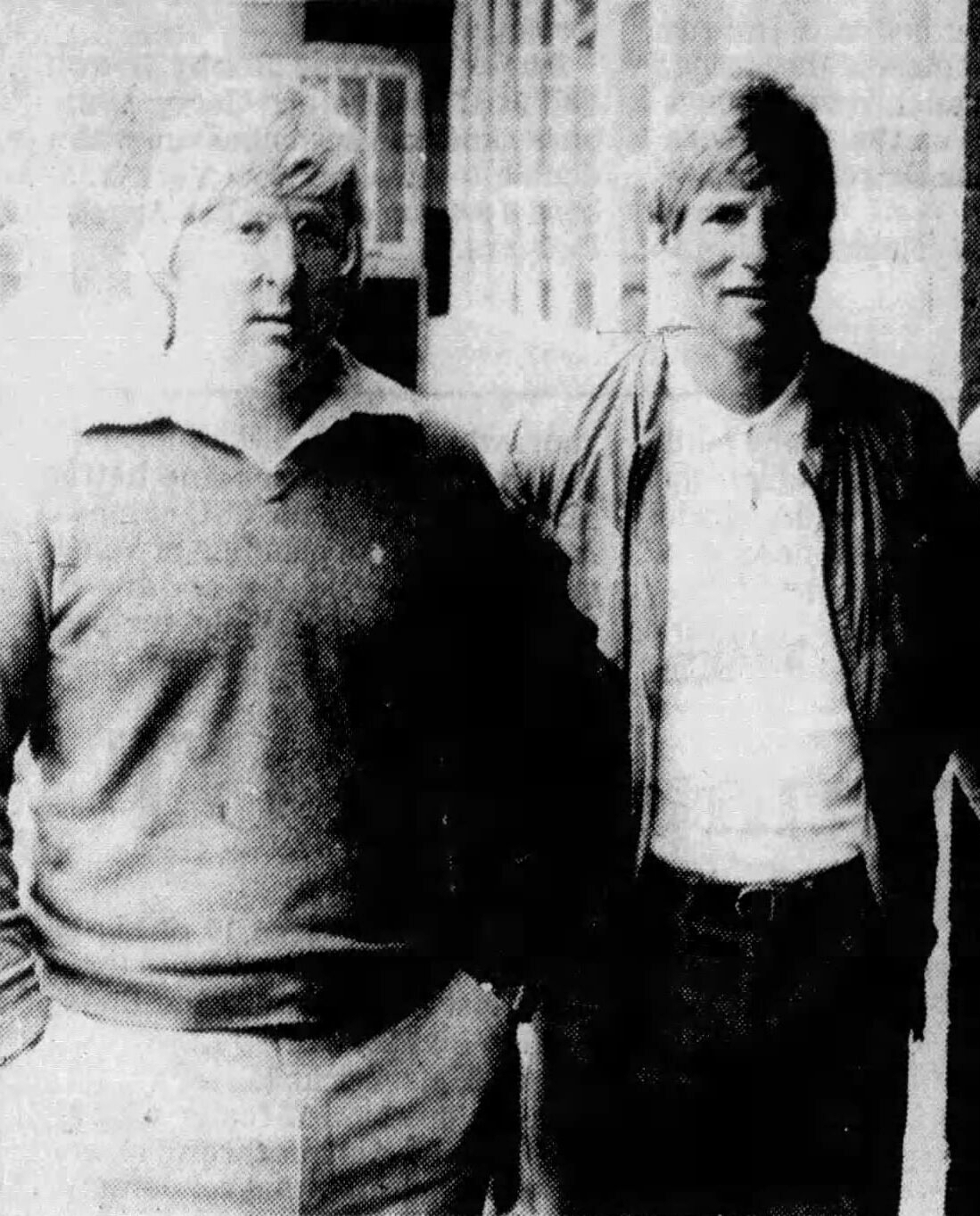
Vogelsinger (right) with soccer clinic co-director Terry Fisher in 1982

Following his exit from the NASL, Vogelsinger turned his focus to running soccer clinics.

== Coaching style ==
Vogelsinger had a reputation as a tough coach with an intense personality, making him unpopular among some fans. He emphasized discipline with his players and said of his relationship with them, "I have no friends. [...] I want to make sure they feel they can't get away with anything. There have to be areas of uncertainty between the players and the coach." His approach has been compared by media to that of American football coach Vince Lombardi; he has compared himself to George Allen, Don Shula, and Tom Landry.

He also had a tense relationship with the media, at times refusing to speak to them and barring them from his locker room. When the Sockers signed leading draft pick Jim Stamatis in 1980, Vogelsinger did not allow Stamatis to attend the media press conference, saying he was at practice.

== Personal life ==
In Vienna, Vogelsinger met Lois Ryan, an American student in Austria on a Fulbright scholarship. He first came to the United States when he accompanied Ryan to Massachusetts in 1961. They were married roughly four weeks after arriving in the country.

Vogelsinger was the author of five books about soccer: How to Star in Soccer (1968), Winning soccer skills and techniques (1970), The Challenge of Soccer: A Handbook of Skills, Techniques, and Strategy (1973), New Challenge of Soccer (1980), and Power Basics of Soccer (1983).

Vogelsinger died on June 22, 2023.
