= Peter Duerden =

Footballer (born 1945)

Personal information
- Date of birth: 5 June 1945 (age 81)
- Place of birth: Burnley, England
- Position: Defender

Senior career*
Years	Team	Apps	(Gls)
1971–1972	Toronto Metros	10	(0)
1972–1973	Montreal Olympique	11	(0)
1973	Toronto First Portuguese		
1978–1979	New York Arrows (indoor)	4	(0)

Managerial career
- 1978: Rochester Lancers (assistant)
- 1978–1980: New York Arrows (assistant)
- 1980–1982: Denver Avalanche (assistant)
- * Club domestic league appearances and goals

Peter Duerden (born 5 June 1945) is a former professional association footballer who played as a defender in the North American Soccer League and the Major Indoor Soccer League. He also served as an assistant coach with teams in both leagues.

== Club career ==
Duerden was born in Burnley, England. In 1964, he moved to Canada where he signed with the Toronto Metros of the North American Soccer League. He began the 1972 season with Toronto before moving to the Montreal Olympique during the season. In late 1973, he played in the National Soccer League with Toronto First Portuguese. He then played a handful of games for the New York Arrows during the 1978-1979 Major Indoor Soccer League season.

== International career ==
In 1971, Duerden played three games with the Canadian Olympic soccer team. That year he also played eight games for the Canadian Pan American Games soccer team.

== Coaching career ==
In 1978, Duerden was an assistant coach with the Rochester Lancers of the North American Soccer League. In 1978, he became an assistant coach-player with the New York Arrows who borrowed much of their roster from the Lancers. He returned to Rochester in the same capacity as an assistant coach for the 1979 season. On 13 July 1979, he was dismissed from his post by the head coach Dragan Popović.

In 1980, the Denver Avalanche of MISL hired Duerden as an assistant coach.
