= Flemming Lund =

Danish footballer (born 1952)

Personal information
- Date of birth: 6 October 1952 (age 74)
- Place of birth: Copenhagen, Denmark
- Height: 1.70 m (5 ft 7 in)
- Position: Midfielder

Senior career*
Years	Team	Apps	(Gls)
1971–1972	B 1903		
1972–1976	Royal Antwerp	124	(20)
1976–1977	Rot-Weiss Essen	34	(2)
1977–1979	Fortuna Düsseldorf	62	(5)
1979–1981	Dallas Tornado	85	(2)
1979–1980	Detroit Lightning (indoor)	32	(7)
1980–1981	Dallas Tornado (indoor)	18	(7)
1981–1983	Buffalo Stallions (indoor)	59	(7)
1983	Vancouver Whitecaps	7	(0)
1983	Tampa Bay Rowdies	17	(0)
1983–1984	Tampa Bay Rowdies (indoor)		
1984–1985	Cleveland Force (indoor)	11	(0)
1985	New York Cosmos (indoor)	5	(1)
1985	Wichita Wings (indoor)	9	(0)

International career
1969–1971	Denmark U-19	7	(1)
1972–1974	Denmark U-21	6	(0)
1972–1979	Denmark	20	(2)
- * Club domestic league appearances and goals

Flemming Lund (born 6 October 1952) is a Danish former professional footballer who played as a midfielder both in Europe and the United States. He played for Royal Antwerp in Belgium and German teams Rot-Weiss Essen and Fortuna Düsseldorf, winning the 1979 DFB-Pokal trophy with Düsseldorf. Lund played 20 games and scored two goals for the Denmark national team from 1972 to 1979. He moved to the United States in 1979 and played for a number of American teams in the North American Soccer League and the Major Indoor Soccer League.

== European career ==
Born in Copenhagen, Lund started his career with local top-flight club B 1903. He was called up for the Danish national under-19 team in September 1969, and went on to play seven games and score one goal for the under-19 national team until June 1971. He played six games for the Danish national under-21 team between June 1972 and May 1974. Simultaneously, he debuted for the senior Denmark national team in June 1972 and went on to play 20 games and score two goals for his country until May 1979.

In the summer of 1972, Lund moved abroad to play professionally with Belgian club Royal Antwerp. He made his Antwerp debut in August 1972, and went on to play 124 games and score 20 goals for Antwerp in the Belgian First Division. After four seasons with Antwerp, Lund went to Rot-Weiss Essen in the German Bundesliga championship in 1976. Lund played 34 games and scored two goals for Essen in the 1976–77 Bundesliga season, but could not prevent Essen from being relegated to the 2. Bundesliga at the end of the season. Lund left Essen and moved to Bundesliga club Fortuna Düsseldorf. He played two seasons at Düsseldorf, and won the 1979 DFB-Pokal trophy with the team. After 62 games and five goals for Düsseldorf in the Bundesliga, Lund left the club in the summer 1979.

== American career ==
In 1979, Lund signed with the Dallas Tornado of the North American Soccer League. He would remain with Dallas through three outdoor seasons. In the fall of 1979, he joined the Detroit Lightning of the Major Indoor Soccer League and was named a first team All Star. He then played the 1980–81 indoor season with the Tornado. He returned to the MISL in the fall of 1981 with the Buffalo Stallions. In 1983, he joined the Vancouver Whitecaps. Seven games into the 1983 season, the Whitecaps sent Lund to the Tampa Bay Rowdies. He finished the season in Tampa Bay, then played the 1983–84 NASL indoor season with them. On 27 April 1984, the Rowdies released Lund. In October 1985, he joined the Cleveland Force for the 1984–85 MISL season. In February 1985, the Force sent Lund to the New York Cosmos in exchange for a second-round draft pick. In March, the Cosmos released Lund who then signed with the Wichita Wings.

== Personal life ==
He is the father of international equestrian Tina Lund. He has won the Zealand championship in badminton with world champion Lene Køppen as his mixed-double partner.

== Honours ==
- DFB-Pokal: 1978–79
- MISL All-Star Team: 1979–80
