= John Brooks (footballer, born 1956) =

English footballer

Personal information
- Date of birth: 24 February 1956 (age 70)
- Place of birth: Derby, England
- Position: Forward

Youth career
- 1976–1979: San Francisco Dons

Senior career*
Years	Team	Apps	(Gls)
1979–1980	Cleveland Force (indoor)	9	(1)
1980–1981	San Francisco Fog (indoor)	32	(11)
1983	Golden Bay Earthquakes (indoor)	1	(0)

Managerial career
- 1995–2009: Dominican University of California
- * Club domestic league appearances and goals

John Brooks is an English retired soccer forward who played professionally in the Major Indoor Soccer League.

Brooks was recruited by San Francisco Dons coach Stephen Negoesco to attend the University of San Francisco. Brooks was visiting his brother Adrian in the United States when Negoesco spotted him. Brooks would play for the Dons from 1976 to 1979, winning the 1976 and 1978 NCAA Men's Division I Soccer Championship with them. He is a member of the USF Dons Athletic Hall of Fame. Brooks turned professional in the fall of 1979 when he signed with the Cleveland Force of Major Indoor Soccer League. He played only nine games and moved to the San Francisco Fog for the 1980–1981 season. In February 1983, he signed with the Golden Bay Earthquakes of MISL. In his first game with the Earthquakes, he lost his hearing when heading the ball. He later sued the Earthquakes. He later coached the Dominican University of California soccer team for fourteen seasons.
