= Greg Delgado =

American soccer player

Personal information
- Date of birth: April 8, 1958 (age 68)
- Place of birth: Hahn Air Base, West Germany
- Height: 6 ft 0 in (1.83 m)
- Position: Defender

College career
Years	Team	Apps	(Gls)
1976–1979	Stanford Cardinal		

Senior career*
Years	Team	Apps	(Gls)
1979–1980	Houston Summit (indoor)	11	(0)
1980–1981	San Francisco Fog (indoor)	16	(2)
- * Club domestic league appearances and goals

Greg Delgado is an American retired soccer defender who spent two seasons in the Major Indoor Soccer League.

== Youth ==
Delgado attended Stanford University, playing on the men's soccer team from 1976 to 1979. He graduated in 1980 with a degree in psychology.

== Professional ==
In 1979, the Houston Summit selected Delgado in the fourth round of the Major Indoor Soccer League draft. He spent one season in Houston before moving to the San Francisco Fog for the 1980–1981 season.
