= Chris Cattaneo =

American soccer player

Personal information
- Date of birth: November 6, 1957 (age 68)
- Place of birth: Brooklyn, New York, U.S.
- Position: Forward

Youth career
- Tennessee Wesleyan College

Senior career*
Years	Team	Apps	(Gls)
1979	Atlanta Chiefs	1	(0)
1980–1981	Denver Avalanche (indoor)	16	(8)
- * Club domestic league appearances and goals

Chris Cattaneo is an American retired soccer forward who played professionally in the North American Soccer League and the Major Indoor Soccer League.

Cattaneo graduated from John F. Kennedy High School. Cattaneo attended Tennessee Wesleyan College where he was a 1977 NAIA Second Team All American soccer player. In 1979, he turned professional with the Atlanta Chiefs of the North American Soccer League. In 1980, he moved to the Denver Avalanche of the Major Indoor Soccer League.

He is currently a volunteer assistant coach for the Drexel Dragons women's team. Cattaneo previously coached for the Delaware Blue Hens women's team.
