= Adrian Brooks =

Footballer (born 1957)

Personal information
- Date of birth: 1957 (age 68–69)
- Place of birth: Derby, England
- Positions: Midfielder; defender

Youth career
- 1971–1974: Ards FC

College career
Years	Team	Apps	(Gls)
1975–1978	Philadelphia Textile Rams		

Senior career*
Years	Team	Apps	(Gls)
1979–1980	Atlanta Chiefs	30	(4)
1979–1980	Atlanta Chiefs (indoor)	12	(3)
1980	Pennsylvania Stoners		
1980–1982	Denver Avalanche (indoor)	83	(34)
1981	Detroit Express		
1982–1984	Baltimore Blast (indoor)	68	(18)
1984–1987	Soccer City		
1989–1990	Atlanta Attack (indoor)		
- Atlanta Datagraphic

International career
1973	Northern Ireland Schoolboy		

Managerial career
- 1987: Kennesaw State Owls
- 1989–1990: Atlanta Attack (assistant)
- 1992: Clayton State Lakers
- * Club domestic league appearances and goals

Adrian Brooks (born 2 October 1957) is a former professional footballer who was the #2 draft pick in the NASL in 1979 and spent two seasons in the North American Soccer League and at least 4 in the Major Indoor Soccer League.He played 2 seasons in the American Soccer League, winning the ASL title in 1980 with the Pennsylvania Stoners .He was a 1977 and 1978 first team All American, coached at the collegiate level and is a sales representative for Adidas.

== Career ==
Brooks attended Philadelphia Textile, playing on the men's soccer team from 1975 to 1978. He was a 1976 second team and 1977 and 1978 first team All American and graduated with a bachelor's degree in business management in 1978. In 1979, the Atlanta Chiefs selected Brooks in the first round of the North American Soccer League draft. He played 29 games in 1979, but only one in 1980. He also played indoor for the Chiefs for one season. In 1980, he moved to the Denver Avalanche of Major Indoor Soccer League where he was named the 1980-1981 All Star Game MVP. In 1982, he moved to the Baltimore Blast, playing two seasons with the Blast. In 1984, Brooks and his teammates won the MISL championship.

He left professional soccer after the championship series. He moved to Atlanta where he played for the Soccer City amateur club for several years. He then moved to Atlanta Datagraphic for several years. In September 1989, Brooks signed with the expansion Atlanta Attack of the American Indoor Soccer Association. He also served as an assistant coach to head coach Keith Tozer. In March 1990, Brooks led the team while Tozer served a game ban after being ejected from a game.

In 1987, Kennesaw State University hired Brooks as the school's head soccer coach. He took the team to a 7–8 record, but the school dropped the soccer program two months later. In 1992, he coached Clayton State University to an 11-5-1 record.

His brother John Brooks played professionally in the United States.
