= Dirk Denkers =

American soccer player

Personal information
- Full name: Dirk Seymour Denkers
- Date of birth: January 27, 1957 (age 69)
- Place of birth: Palo Alto, California, U.S.
- Positions: Defender; midfielder

Youth career
- 1975–1977: UC Davis

Senior career*
Years	Team	Apps	(Gls)
1978	Minnesota Kicks		
- Sacramento Gold
1980–1981	San Francisco Fog (indoor)	16	(7)
- * Club domestic league appearances and goals

Dirk Denkers (born January 27, 1957) is an American retired soccer player who spent one season in both the North American Soccer League and Major Indoor Soccer League as well as an unknown number in the American Soccer League.

Denkers was an All-American in High School and attended UC Davis where he played on the men's soccer team from 1975 to 1977. In 1978, Denkers turned professional with the Minnesota Kicks of the North American Soccer League. He also played the 1980-1981 Major Indoor Soccer League season with the San Francisco Fog. He also played for the Sacramento Gold of the American Soccer League. Denkers was selected to play for the 1980 United States Olympic Soccer Team.
