= Steve Ryan (soccer) =

American soccer player

Personal information
- Full name: Stephen Ryan
- Date of birth: October 27, 1956 (age 70)
- Place of birth: San Francisco, California, United States
- Positions: Forward; midfielder

College career
Years	Team	Apps	(Gls)
1975	San Francisco State Gators		
1976–1978	San Jose State Spartans		

Senior career*
Years	Team	Apps	(Gls)
1979–1980	San Jose Earthquakes	31	(2)
1979–1980	Detroit Lightning (indoor)	25	(7)
1981	California Surf	14	(0)
1981–1982	New Jersey Rockets (indoor)	38	(15)
1982–1983	Golden Bay Earthquakes (indoor)	1	(0)
- * Club domestic league appearances and goals

Steve Ryan is a retired American soccer player who played professionally in the North American Soccer League and American Soccer League.

== Youth ==
Ryan graduated from Archbishop Riordan High School. He also played for the San Francisco Glens. He then entered San Francisco State University where he played soccer during the 1975 season. Ryan then transferred to San Jose State University, finishing his soccer career with them. In 2010, SJSU awarded Ryan its Lifetime Achievement Award. In 1979, he was captain of the U.S. soccer team at the 1979 World University Games.

== Professional ==
In 1979, the San Jose Earthquakes of the North American Soccer League drafted Ryan. He played two outdoor seasons with the Earthquakes and one indoor season (1979–1980) on loan to the Detroit Lightning of the Major Indoor Soccer League. On May 22, 1981, the Earthquakes traded Ryan to the California Surf in exchange for Mark Lindsay.
