= Sergio Velazquez (Mexican footballer) =

Mexican footballer (born 1952)

Juan Sergio Velazquez
Personal information
- Full name: Juan Sergio Velazquez
- Date of birth: 25 February 1952 (age 74)
- Place of birth: León, Guanajuato, Mexico
- Height: 5 ft 9 in (1.75 m)
- Position: Forward

College career
Years	Team	Apps	(Gls)
1971	UCLA Bruins		
1973–1974	UCLA Bruins		

Senior career*
Years	Team	Apps	(Gls)
1975–1976	Los Angeles Aztecs	17	(2)
1977	Seattle Sounders	4	(0)
1980–1981	Phoenix Inferno (indoor)	7	(1)
Total		28	(3)
- * Club domestic league appearances and goals

Juan Sergio Velazquez (born 25 February 1952) is a Mexican former professional footballer who played as a forward in the North American Soccer League and Major Indoor Soccer League.

Born in León, Guanajuato, Mexico, Velazquez's family moved to El Monte, California, when he was nine years old. He attended Rosemead High School in Rosemead, California. Rosemead High School did not have a soccer team at the time Velazquez attended but he was scouted by the UCLA Bruins while he played with the Valley Germans semi-pro club when he was 17. Velazquez attended UCLA where he played on the men's soccer team in 1971 and again in 1973 and 1974. He was a 1971 and 1973 Honorable Mention All American. Velazquez still holds the record for Most Goals in a season for UCLA scoring 28 goals in the 1973 season. On January 15, 1975, the San Antonio Thunder picked Velasquez in first round (second overall) of the North American Soccer League draft. Six days later, the Los Angeles Aztecs traded Luis Marotte, Pedro Martinez, Renato Costa, Julio Cesar Cortez, Ricardo de Rienzo, Mario Zanotti and Blas Sanchez to the San Antonio Thunder in exchange for Velasquez and the Thunder's 1976 and 1977 first round draft picks. Velazquez spent two seasons with the Aztecs before being traded to the Seattle Sounders in exchange for Paul Gizzi on February 2, 1977. Velasquez also played one season for the Phoenix Inferno of the Major Indoor Soccer League.
