= Kevin Howe =

American soccer player

Personal information
- Place of birth: St. Louis, Missouri, U.S.
- Position: Defender

Youth career
- 1969–1972: SIU Edwardsville Cougars

Senior career*
Years	Team	Apps	(Gls)
1973	Atlanta Apollos	11	(1)
1974–1975	Denver Dynamos	14	(2)
- * Club domestic league appearances and goals

Kevin Howe is an American retired soccer defender who played professionally in the North American Soccer League.

Howe, along with his brother Tom, graduated from Christian Brothers College High School in St. Louis, Missouri. He then attended Southern Illinois University-Edwardsville where he played on the men's soccer team from 1969 to 1972. In 1972, Howe was the captain of the Couger's soccer team as it won the NCAA Men's Division II Soccer Championship. He graduated in 1974 with a bachelor's degree in psychology and was inducted into the Cougars Hall of Fame in 2009. In 1973, Howe turned professional with the Atlanta Apollos of the North American Soccer League. He moved to the Denver Dynamos for the 1974 and 1975 seasons.

In 2004, the St. Louis Soccer Hall of Fame inducted Howe.
