= Jeff Solem =

American soccer player

Personal information
- Full name: Jeffrey J. Solem
- Date of birth: January 28, 1948 (age 78)
- Place of birth: Fargo, North Dakota, United States
- Height: 6 ft 1 in (1.85 m)
- Positions: Midfielder; defender

College career
Years	Team	Apps	(Gls)
1965–1968	Emory Eagles		

Senior career*
Years	Team	Apps	(Gls)
1973	Atlanta Apollos	10	(0)
1974–1975	Denver Dynamos	31	(0)
1976	Minnesota Kicks	3	(0)
1979–1992	Atlanta Datagraphic		
- * Club domestic league appearances and goals

Jeff Solem is a retired American soccer player who spent four seasons in the North American Soccer League. He is currently the president of Uhlsport USA.

Solem attended Emory University, where he holds several school soccer records. He was inducted into the school's athletic Hall of Fame in 1990. In 1973, he Solem signed with the Atlanta Apollos of the North American Soccer League. In 1974, he moved to the Denver Dynamos for two seasons. In 1976, he played three games with the Minnesota Kicks. After retiring, he worked in several sport related industries including sporting goods. He also continued to play top level amateur soccer with Atlanta Datagraphic, joining the team soon after its founding and winning the 1979 National Amateur Cup with the team. In January 2003, he became president of Select Sports America. In December 2008, he left Select Sports and became the president of Uhlsport USA.
