= Vilhelm Tellinher =

Personal information
- Full name: Vilhelm Pavlovych Tellinher
- Date of birth: 20 October 1950
- Place of birth: Mukacheve, Ukrainian SSR, Soviet Union
- Date of death: 24 January 2013 (aged 62)
- Place of death: Berehove, Ukraine
- Position: Forward

Youth career
- 1964–1966: Lokomotyv Mukacheve

Senior career*
Years	Team	Apps	(Gls)
1967–1968	FC Torpedo Lutsk	19	(4)
1969	FC Verkhovyna Uzhhorod	32	
1970	FC Karpaty Mukacheve	13	
1970–1971	SKA Lviv	29	(13)
1972–1976	PFC CSKA Moscow	62	(15)
1976–1977	FC SKA Rostov-na-Donu	29	(3)
1978–1980	SKA Lviv	75	(20)
1980–1981	FC Podillya Khmelnytskyi	67	(20)

International career
1972–1973	USSR U-23	2	(2)

Managerial career
- 1980: SKA Lviv (ass't)
- 1990: FC Halychyna Drohobych (ass't)
- 1991: FC Halychyna Drohobych
- 1992: FC Pryladyst Mukacheve
- 1993–1994: Kiskőrös-Stadler FC
- 1994–1996: Stadler FC (ass't)
- 1996–1997: Hajdúnánás Góliát Bútor FK
- 1999–2000: Kiskőrösi FC
- 2001–2004: Kiskunmajsa FC
- 2007: SC Beregvidek Berehove
- * Club domestic league appearances and goals

Vilhelm Pavlovych Tellinher (Ukrainian: Вільгельм Павлович Теллінгер; Hungarian: Telinger Vilmos; 20 October 1950 – 24 January 2013) was a Soviet professional football forward and coach from Ukraine.

Tellinher was a product of Lokomotyv Mukacheve football academy.
