= Mark Liveric =

Croatian-American soccer player (born 1953)

Personal information
- Full name: Mirko Liverić
- Date of birth: August 16, 1953 (age 73)
- Place of birth: Zaton, PR Croatia,
- Position: Forward

Senior career*
Years	Team	Apps	(Gls)
1974–1975	New York Cosmos	39	(7)
1976–1977	San Jose Earthquakes	22	(10)
1977	Washington Diplomats	15	(2)
1978	Oakland Stompers	11	(0)
1979	Edmonton Drillers	5	(0)
1979–1980	New York Cosmos	28	(11)
1980–1981	Baltimore Blast (indoor)	30	(32)
1981	San Jose Earthquakes	14	(1)
1981–1984	New York Arrows (indoor)	136	(126)
1984–1985	Kansas City Comets (indoor)	9	(3)
1985	New York Cosmos (indoor)	17	(20)
1985–1986	Pittsburgh Spirit (indoor)	13	(4)
1986–1987	New York Express (indoor)	25	(17)

International career
1973–1980	United States	16	(3)
- * Club domestic league appearances and goals

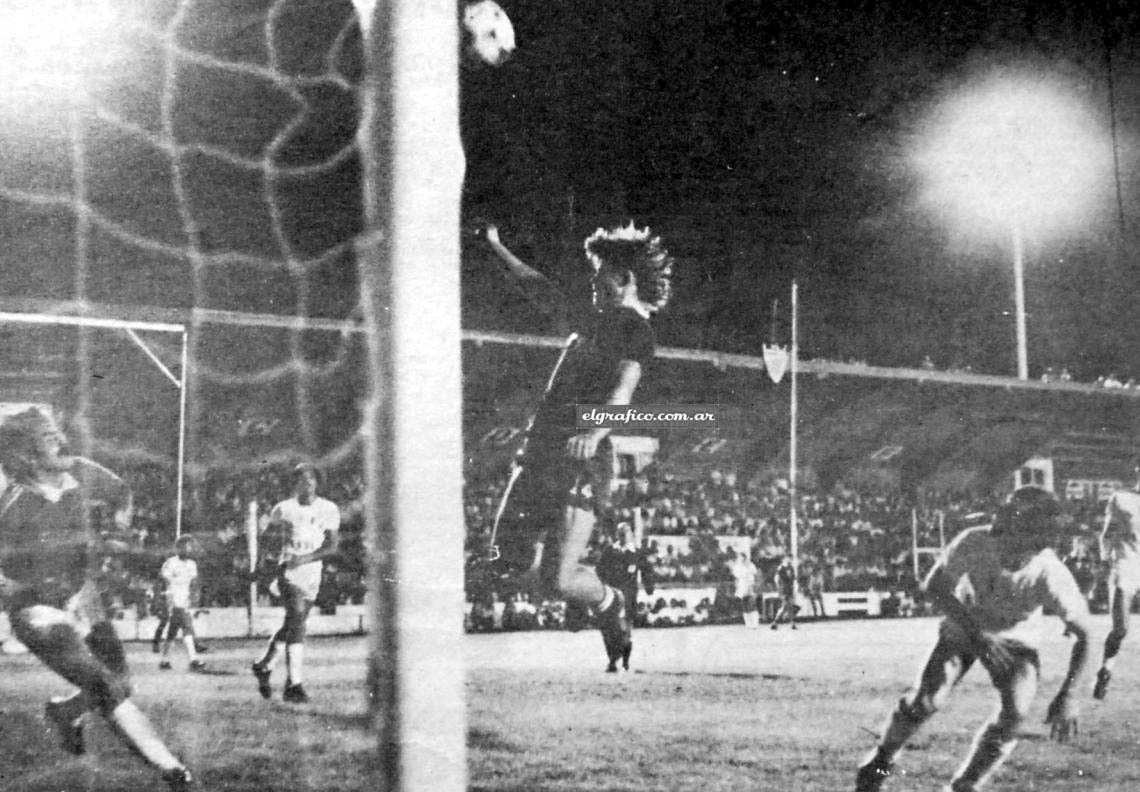

Mirko "Mark" Liveric (Croatian: Liverić; born August 16, 1953) is an American retired soccer forward who spent eight years in the North American Soccer League and seven in the Major Indoor Soccer League. He also earned sixteen caps, scoring three goals, with the U.S. national team.

== NASL ==
Liveric, a native of Croatia, began his U.S. soccer career with the New York Cosmos in the North American Soccer League (NASL). He spent the 1974 and 1975 seasons with the Cosmos. On January 31, 1976, the Cosmos traded Liveric to the San Jose Earthquakes for cash. Liveric's one full season with the Earthquakes was his most productive. He scored ten goals in twenty games, adding nine assists. This led to his selection as a 1976 Honorable Mention NASL All Star. While Liveric began the 1977 season with the Earthquakes, the team traded him to the Washington Diplomats after only two games. He then appeared in fifteen games, scoring only two goals with the Dips before moving back to California to the Oakland Stompers during the off season. The Stompers only lasted one season before folding and Liveric found himself with the Edmonton Drillers at the beginning of the 1979 season, only to be traded back to the New York Cosmos after only five games. He spent the 1980 season in New York before the Cosmos traded him, for a second time, to the San Jose Earthquakes.

== MISL ==
In 1980, Liveric joined the Baltimore Blast of the Major Indoor Soccer League (MISL). He returned to the NASL for one last outdoor season in 1981 with the Earthquakes. In 1981, Liveric joined the New York Arrows (MISL) and spent the next three seasons with them. During the 1983-1984 quarterfinal playoff season with the Blast, Liveric was part of a brawl between the two teams. As a result, the league suspended him for two playoff games and five regular-season games. However, in July 1984, the Arrows sold Liveric to Kansas City Comets after the Arrows went bankrupt. As a result, Liveric sat out the first five games with the Comets in order to serve his suspension. Liveric played the next nine games then was suspended by his coach. On January 4, 1985, the Comets sold Liveric to the New York Cosmos. After the Cosmos folded during the 1984–1985 season, the Cosmos released Liveric and he signed with the Pittsburgh Spirit in March 1985. He played out the season with the Spirit. In 1986, Liveric joined the New York Express (MISL). However, the Express made it only to the All Star break before folding.

== National team ==
Liveric earned sixteen caps with the U.S. national team between 1973 and 1980, scoring three goals. His first game came in a 1–0 loss to Poland on August 3, 1973, at Soldier Field in Chicago. He scored his first goal two days later in Windsor as the U.S. defeated Canada 2–0. His last game came in a 2–1 loss to Canada in a November 1, 1980, World Cup Qualifier at Empire Stadium in Vancouver. Liveric came off for Steve Moyers in the 76th minute.
