= Chris Turner (soccer) =

Canadian soccer player

Personal information
- Date of birth: February 1, 1960 (age 66)
- Place of birth: Vancouver, British Columbia, Canada
- Height: 6 ft 1 in (1.85 m)
- Position: Goalkeeper

Senior career*
Years	Team	Apps	(Gls)
1979–1980	San Jose Earthquakes	29	(0)
1979–1980	Detroit Lightning (indoor)	32	(0)
1980–1981	San Jose Earthquakes (indoor)	1	(0)
1981	Los Angeles Aztecs	25	(0)
1982	San Diego Sockers	2	(0)
1983	Seattle Sounders	1	(0)
1984	Vancouver Whitecaps	1	(0)

International career
1978–1979	Canada U-20	5	(0)
1983–1984	Canada	4	(0)
- * Club domestic league appearances and goals

Chris Turner (born February 1, 1960) is a Canadian retired soccer goalkeeper who played professionally in the North American Soccer League and Major Indoor Soccer League. He also earned four caps with the Canada national team.

== Professional ==
In 1979, Turner signed with the San Jose Earthquakes where he became a regular in the nets. He played for the Detroit Lightning during the 1979–80 Major Indoor Soccer League season. In 1981, he played for the Los Angeles Aztecs. After the Aztecs folded at the end of the season, the San Diego Sockers picked up Turner in the Dispersal Draft. He played only one game for the Sockers before moving to the Seattle Sounders for the 1983 season. When the Sounders folded at the end of the season, Turner moved north to the Vancouver Whitecaps.

== National team ==
In 1978, he began playing for the Canada U-20 men's national soccer team which qualified for the 1979 FIFA World Youth Championship. He played in all three Canadian games in the tournament. On June 19, 1983, he earned his first cap with the Canada national team in a 0–2 loss to Scotland.
