= San Francisco Fog (soccer) =

- Full name: San Francisco Fog
- Nickname: Fog
- Founded: 1980
- Dissolved: 1981
- Ground: Cow Palace; Daly City, California
- Capacity: 11,089 (under 5,000 per game)
- Chairman: David Schoenstadt
- Manager: Johnny Moore
- League: Major Indoor Soccer League
- 11–29: 4th, Western Division

The San Francisco Fog was a Major Indoor Soccer League franchise which existed for only one season, 1980–1981.

== History ==
The Fog, which played their home games at the Cow Palace, finished their single season of existence at 11–29. The team used The Eagles "Heartache Tonight" as their anthem, which was played when their cheerleading squad, The Mistys, came out to perform. The Mistys wore all black outfits

On May 28, 1980, at the end of the 1979–1980 season, the owner of the Detroit Lightning, Jerry Perenchio, sold his team to David Schoenstadt who moved the team from Detroit, Michigan to San Francisco, California where he renamed the team the San Francisco Fog. It had few decent players and drew under five thousand fans per game. After a dismal 1980–1981 season, Schoenstadt moved the franchise to Kansas City in May 1981 where the team flourished as the Kansas City Comets, the Fog finished 4th in the West division and did not qualify for the playoffs.

== Roster ==
Note: Flags indicate national team as defined under FIFA eligibility rules; some limited exceptions apply. Players may hold more than one non-FIFA nationality.

No.	Pos.	Nation	Player
1	GK	USA	Roy Messing
2	DF	USA	Buzz Demling
3	DF	USA	Lee Atack
4	DF	USA	Mark Demling
5	DF		Andy Stanton
6	FW	USA	Mani Hernandez
7	FW	USA	Art Welch
8	FW	USA	Johnny Moore
9	FW	USA	Geoff Davies
10	FW	ENG	Jimmy Rolland
11	FW	USA	John Smillie
12	MF	NGA	Andy Atuegbu

No.	Pos.	Nation	Player
13	MF	SCO	Davie Kemp
14	DF	ENG	Brian Joy
15	DF	USA	Len Salvemini
16	FW	ENG	John Brooks
17	MF	ENG	Mike Mancini
18	DF	USA	Dirk Denkers
19	DF	ENG	Len Renery
20	GK	USA	Tom Reynolds
—	FW	ESP	Manny Cuenca
—	DF	USA	Greg Delgado
—	FW	USA	Doug Wark
—	MF	IRL	Gerard McAleese
—	FW	ENG	Alan Sproates

== Staff ==
- Dick Berg, General manager
- Johnny Moore, Coach
- Peter Simon, Public Relations Director
- Brad Jacobs, Marketing Director

=== Indoor year-by-year ===
Year	League	Record	Reg. season	Playoffs	Avg. attendance
1980–81	MISL	11–29	4th West	Opted out of playoffs	4,588
