= Derek Craig =

English footballer

Personal information
- Full name: Derek Malcolm Craig
- Date of birth: 28 July 1952 (age 74)
- Place of birth: Ryton-on-Tyne, England
- Height: 6 ft 0 in (1.83 m)
- Position: Central defender

Youth career
- –: Newcastle United

Senior career*
Years	Team	Apps	(Gls)
1969–1975	Newcastle United	2	(0)
1975	San Jose Earthquakes	15	(2)
1975–1980	Darlington	187	(10)
1980–1982	York City	53	(1)
- Brandon United
- * Club domestic league appearances and goals

Derek Malcolm Craig is an English footballer who made nearly 250 appearances in the Football League playing as a central defender for Newcastle United, San Jose Earthquakes, Darlington, York City and Brandon United. He also played in the North American Soccer League for the San Jose Earthquakes and in non-league football for Brandon United.

As a youngster he played for Clara Vale in the 1960s. He made his professional debut with Newcastle United during the 1971–72 season.
