= Jorge Siega =

Brazilian-American soccer player

Personal information
- Date of birth: April 3, 1947 (age 79)
- Place of birth: Cotiporã, Brazil
- Position: Forward

Senior career*
Years	Team	Apps	(Gls)
1968	Washington Whips	31	(8)
1969–1970	German-Hungarians		
1971–1976	New York Cosmos	81	(15)

International career
1973	United States	8	(0)

Managerial career
- Blau-Weiss Gottschee
- * Club domestic league appearances and goals

Jorge Siega (born Brazil) is a Brazilian-American former football (soccer) forward who spent eight seasons in the North American Soccer League, seven with the New York Cosmos. He also earned eight caps with the U.S. national team in 1973.

== NASL ==
Siega joined the Washington Whips of the North American Soccer League (NASL) in 1968. The Whips folded at the end of the season and Siega moved to the German-Hungarians of the German American Soccer League. In 1971, he was the first player signed by the expansion New York Cosmos. He was a second team All Star in 1971 and 1972 and continued with the Cosmos through the 1976 season.

== National team ==
Siega earned his first cap on March 17, 1973, in a 4–0 loss to Bermuda. He went on to play a total of eight games with the national team in 1973. His last came in a 3–1 loss to Israel on November 13, 1973.

== Post NASL career ==
After leaving the NASL, Siega continued playing amateur and semi-professional soccer with the German-Hungarian Metros in the New York Cosmopolitan Soccer League. He also coached for Blau-Weiss Gottschee.
