= John Smillie (soccer) =

Scottish-American soccer player

Personal information
- Date of birth: 16 April 1954 (age 72)
- Place of birth: Glasgow, Scotland
- Positions: Forward; defender

College career
| Years | Team | Apps | (Gls) |
| 1972–1973 | De Anza Mountain Lions | | |
| 1974–1975 | San Jose State Spartans | | |

Senior career*
| Years | Team | Apps | (Gls) |
| 1976 | Portland Timbers | 1 | (0) |
| 1977–1978 | San Jose Earthquakes | 13 | (0) |
| 1978–1979 | Cincinnati Kids (indoor) | 20 | (14) |
| 1980–1981 | San Francisco Fog (indoor) | 32 | (6) |
- * Club domestic league appearances and goals

John Smillie (born April 16, 1954) is a Scottish retired-American soccer player who played professionally in the North American Soccer League and Major Indoor Soccer League.

In 1972, Smillie began his collegiate soccer career at De Anza College before transferring to San Jose State University where he was a 1975 Second Team All American soccer player. In 1976, the Portland Timbers selected Smillie in the first round of the North American Soccer League draft. He transferred to the San Jose Earthquakes for the 1977 and 1978 seasons. In the fall of 1978, he moved indoors with the Cincinnati Kids of the Major Indoor Soccer League. He also played the 1980–1981 season with the San Francisco Fog of MISL.
