= Bernd Gersdorff =

German footballer (born 1946)

Personal information
- Date of birth: 18 November 1946 (age 79)
- Place of birth: Berlin-Wilmersdorf, Germany
- Position: Midfielder

Youth career
- –1965: SC Charlottenburg

Senior career*
Years	Team	Apps	(Gls)
1965–1969	Tennis Borussia Berlin		
1969–1973	Eintracht Braunschweig	129	(22)
1973	Bayern Munich	12	(2)
1973–1976	Eintracht Braunschweig	93	(64)
1977–1979	Hertha BSC	69	(14)
1979	San Jose Earthquakes	30	(10)
1979–1980	Hertha BSC	16	(1)
1980	San Jose Earthquakes	5	(1)
1980	San Diego Sockers	11	(5)

International career
1975	West Germany B	1	(0)
1975	West Germany	1	(0)
- * Club domestic league appearances and goals

Bernd Gersdorff (born 18 November 1946) is a German former professional footballer who played as a midfielder.

== Club career ==
Gersdorff was born in Berlin-Wilmersdorf. He spent 12 seasons in the Bundesliga with Eintracht Braunschweig, FC Bayern Munich and Hertha BSC.

== International career ==
Gersdorff also played once for the West Germany national team (on 3 September 1975 in a friendly against Austria).

== Honours ==
Bayern Munich

- Bundesliga: 1973–74

Hertha BSC

- DFB-Pokal runners-up: 1976–77, 1978–79
