= Archie Roboostoff =

Soccer player (1951–2019)

Personal information
- Full name: Archie Vincent Roboostoff
- Date of birth: October 9, 1951
- Place of birth: Shanghai, China
- Date of death: July 29, 2019 (aged 67)
- Place of death: Granite Bay, California, U.S.
- Height: 6 ft 0 in (1.83 m)
- Position: Forward

Senior career*
Years	Team	Apps	(Gls)
- Concordia A.C.
1974–1975	San Jose Earthquakes	40	(10)
1976	San Diego Jaws	23	(4)
1977–1978	Portland Timbers	21	(5)
1978	Oakland Stompers	17	(1)

International career
1971–1972	United States Olympic	3	(0)
1973–1975	United States	7	(0)
- * Club domestic league appearances and goals

Archie Vincent Roboostoff (October 9, 1951 – July 29, 2019) was an American soccer forward who spent five seasons in the North American Soccer League. He was also a member of the U.S. Olympic soccer team at the 1972 Summer Olympics. He was born in Shanghai, China.

== National and Olympic teams ==
Roboostoff was selected for the U.S. Olympic team in 1971 as it began the qualification process for the 1972 Summer Olympics to be held in Munich. At the time he played for the Concordia Athletic Club in the San Francisco League. He played all three U.S. games in the tournament as the U.S. went 0–2–1. Following the Olympics, he was called into the U.S. national team. He earned his first cap when he replaced Emmanuel Georges at halftime of an August 10, 1973, loss to Poland. His second cap, and first start, came over a year later in a September 5, 1975, loss to Mexico. He played five more games with the senior team, his last coming on August 25, 1975, a loss to Mexico when he came on for Joey Fink in the sixty-six minute.

== Professional ==
In 1974, Roboostoff signed with the San Jose Earthquakes of the North American Soccer League. He spent the 1974 and 1975 seasons in San Jose before being traded to the San Diego Jaws. He lasted only one season in San Diego before moving to the Portland Timbers for the 1977 season. In 1978, he played three games in Portland before being traded to the Oakland Stompers. At the end of the 1978 season, Roboostoff left the NASL.

== Daly City Police Athletic League Hall of Fame ==
In 2013, Archie Roboostoff, along with his brothers Constantin and Alex, were inducted to the Daly City Police Athletic League Sports Hall of Fame.
