= Sam Bick =

American soccer player

Personal information
- Date of birth: January 30, 1955 (age 71)
- Place of birth: St. Louis, Missouri, U.S.
- Position: Midfielder

Youth career
- 1972–1975: Quincy University

Senior career*
| Years | Team | Apps | (Gls) |
| 1976–1978 | Minnesota Kicks | 29 | (0) |
| 1979–1980 | San Jose Earthquakes | 31 | (1) |
| 1979–1987 | St. Louis Steamers (indoor) | 300 | (41) |
| Total | | 360 | (42) |

International career
| 1976 | United States | 2 | (0) |
- * Club domestic league appearances and goals

Sam Bick (born January 30, 1955) is an American former professional soccer player who played as a midfielder. He spent nine seasons in the North American Soccer League and seven seasons in the Major Indoor Soccer League. He also earned two caps with the United States men's national soccer team in 1976.

== Youth and college ==
Bick grew up in St. Louis, Missouri where he played in the St. Louis Celtics youth club and for De Smet Jesuit High School. He then attended Quincy University, playing on the men's soccer team from 1972 to 1975. In 1973, 1974 and 1975 Quincy won the NAIA Championship. Bick not only experienced success with his team, but he also experienced personal recognition, earning both NAIA All Tournament and first team All-American recognition in 1975. He graduated from Quincy in 1976 and was selected to the Quincy Athletic Hall of Fame in 1984.

== Professional ==
In 1976, the Minnesota Kicks signed Bick. He played three seasons with the Kicks before moving to the San Jose Earthquakes in 1979. He played two seasons with the Earthquakes, leaving the NASL in 1980. After leaving the Earthquakes at the end of the 1980 season, Bick signed with the St. Louis Steamers of Major Indoor Soccer League (MISL). He remained with the Steamers until they folded at the end of the 1987–1988 season, becoming the team captain in 1984 after Steve Pecher broke his leg.

== National team ==
Bick earned two caps with the U.S. national team in 1976. His first game came in a scoreless tie with Mexico in an October 3, 1976, World Cup qualifier. He was subbed out for Steve Ralbovsky in the 58th minute. He then played in another scoreless tie with Haiti on November 12, 1976.
