= Boris Bandov =

Yugoslavian born, American soccer player

Personal information
- Date of birth: November 23, 1953 (age 72)
- Place of birth: Livno, PR Bosnia and Herzegovina, FPR Yugoslavia
- Height: 5 ft 10 in (1.78 m)
- Positions: Midfielder; defender

Youth career
- 1972: Silver Creek Raiders

Senior career*
Years	Team	Apps	(Gls)
1974–1975	San Jose Earthquakes	37	(8)
1976–1977	Seattle Sounders	11	(2)
1977–1978	Tampa Bay Rowdies	8	(0)
1979–1982	New York Cosmos	29	(1)
1980–1981	New York Cosmos (indoor)		
1983	Team America	21	(0)
1984–1985	Kansas City Comets (indoor)	34	(1)
1984–1985	Fort Lauderdale Sun		
1985–1986	New York Croatia		

International career
1976–1983	United States	33	(2)

Managerial career
- 1988–: Manhattan College (assistant)
- * Club domestic league appearances and goals

Boris Bandov (born November 23, 1953) is a Bosnian-American former professional soccer player who currently coaches youth soccer. Bandov spent ten seasons in the North American Soccer League, two in the Major Indoor Soccer League and one in the United Soccer League. While born in Bosnia-Hercegovina, he became a U.S. citizen in 1976. He earned thirty-three caps, scoring two goals, with the U.S. national team between 1976 and 1983.

== Youth ==
Bandov was born in Livno, PR Bosnia and Herzegovina, FPR Yugoslavia (now Livno, Federation of Bosnia and Herzegovina). He attended Silver Creek High School in San Jose, California, where he played on the school's boys soccer team. In 1972, he led the team to California's Central Coast Section high school championship game, which the team lost to Archbishop Mitty High School. After graduating from high school, he briefly attended San Jose State, playing on the school's football team as a kicker. His longest was a 52-yard field goal in a game against Cal.

== Professional ==
Bandov began his professional U.S. soccer career with the San Jose Earthquakes of the North American Soccer League on May 5, 1974. He played two seasons with the Earthquakes as a forward/midfield winger before moving to the Seattle Sounders after the 1975 season. He spent most of 1976 on the Sounders reserve team, only making the first team after midfield winger Jimmy Robertson suffered a broken leg from a brutal tackle from Julio Navarro in a July 24, 1976 game against the Philadelphia Atoms. Bandov played 5 games with the Sounders at the start of the 1977 season before moving to the Tampa Bay Rowdies for the remainder of the season. Though he saw limited playing time in just under two seasons in Tampa Bay, he was a reserve in the Rowdies' 3–1 loss to the Cosmos in Soccer Bowl '78. In 1979 Bandov moved to the New York Cosmos. He played with them through the end of the 1982 season, including the two NASL championship teams of 1980 and 1982 as well as the 1981 NASL championship loss to the Chicago Sting. In 1983, the U.S. Soccer Federation, in coordination with the NASL, entered the U.S. national team, known as Team America, into the NASL as a league franchise. The team drew on U.S. citizens playing in the NASL, Major Indoor Soccer League and American Soccer League.

In April 1983, Team America announced it had signed Bandov from the Cosmos on a game-by-game basis. He played 21 games with the team during its single season in existence. When Team America finished the 1983 season with a 10–20 record, the worst in the NASL, USSF withdrew the team from the league. Bandov returned to the Cosmos, but was released on November 16, 1983, when Bandov refused to agree to a 20% pay cut. In 1984, Bandov moved to the Fort Lauderdale Sun of the United Soccer League. He continued to play for the Suns in 1985. He retired in 1986 and lives in Dobbs Ferry with his wife, a former Miss Oregon. He coaches for the FC Westchester U-17 boys and at various soccer camps and clinics.

== National team ==
When Bandov became a U.S. citizen, he was almost immediately called into the national team for its first game of the year, a September 24 1978 FIFA World Cup qualifying game with Canada. Bandov began his national team career with a bang, scoring the tying goal. He went on to start every national team game in 1976, 1977, 1978, and 1979. In 1980, his appearances began to taper off, but he still played the only U.S. games in 1982 and 1983. The 1983 game, a 2–0 win over Haiti was his last with the team. Despite playing a total of 33 games with the team, he scored only once again after his first game, in a 3–1 win over Bermuda in October 1979.

== Coach ==
In 1988, he was hired as an assistant soccer coach with Manhattan College.

== Honors ==
- Soccer Bowl '80
- Soccer Bowl '82
- Soccer Bowl '78 (runner up)
- Soccer Bowl '81 (runner up)
- USL: 1984
- USL Cup: 1985
- Cosmopolitan Soccer League: 1986
