= Jim Zylker =

American soccer player

Personal information
- Full name: James Francis Zylker
- Date of birth: January 11, 1951 (age 75)
- Place of birth: San Francisco, California, U.S.
- Height: 5 ft 9 in (1.75 m)
- Positions: Defender; midfielder

College career
Years	Team	Apps	(Gls)
1969–1970	Cañada Colts		
1971–1973	San Jose State Spartans		

Senior career*
Years	Team	Apps	(Gls)
- San Francisco Vikings
1975–1976	San Jose Earthquakes	17	(1)
1976	San Antonio Thunder	5	(0)

Managerial career
- 2001–2004: Cañada Lady Colts (asst.)
- * Club domestic league appearances and goals

Jim Zylker (born January 11, 1951) is a retired American soccer player who spent two seasons in the North American Soccer League. He was also a member of the United States soccer team at the 1972 Summer Olympics.

== Youth ==
Zylker grew up in San Francisco, California. He graduated from South San Francisco High School and first attended Cañada College where he was a two-time community college All-American. He transferred to San Jose State University where he played three seasons (1971–1973) on the men's soccer team. He was a 1972 second team All American and holds the school's single season assists record. He was inducted into the SJSU Athletic Hall of Fame in 2004.

In 1971, he joined the United States Olympic soccer team as it prepared for the 1972 Olympics. He played the final United States group game, a 7–0 loss to West Germany. In 1975, he returned to the Olympic team as it failed to qualify for the 1976 Summer Olympics. He played seven games in total with the United States Olympic team.

Zykler played for the San Francisco Vikings, a club founded by his grandfather. In 1975, he signed with the San Jose Earthquakes of the North American Soccer League. He played fifteen games that season. He began the 1976 season in San Jose before being traded to the San Antonio Thunder midway through the season.

He has coached the Cañada College women's soccer team.
