= Manuel Hernandez (soccer) =

Spanish-American soccer player (born 1948)

Mani Hernandez
Personal information
- Full name: Manuel Fonseca Hernandez
- Date of birth: August 2, 1948 (age 78)
- Place of birth: Madrid, Spain
- Height: 5 ft 3 in (1.60 m)
- Position: Forward

Youth career
- 1958–1962: Atlético Madrid

College career
Years	Team	Apps	(Gls)
1967–1971	San Jose State Spartans		

Senior career*
Years	Team	Apps	(Gls)
- Grenadiers S.C.
1974–1976	San Jose Earthquakes	46	(4)
1979–1980	Detroit Lightning (indoor)	38	(8)
1980–1981	San Francisco Fog (indoor)	23	(9)

International career
1974	United States	2	(0)

Managerial career
- 1982–: Presentation High School
- * Club domestic league appearances and goals

Manuel "Mani" Hernandez (born August 2, 1948, in Madrid, Spain) is a Spanish-American former soccer forward. He played collegiate soccer at San Jose State University where he won the 1968 Hermann Trophy as the collegiate player of the year. He later spent three seasons with the San Jose Earthquakes of the North American Soccer League. He currently coaches high school girls' soccer at Presentation High School.

== Player ==
=== Youth and college ===
Hernandez was born in Spain where he spent most of his youth. He joined Atletico Madrid soccer club as a youth player, but his life took a turn when tragedy struck. After the death of both of his parents, Hernandez left Spain to live with his uncle in the United States. He arrived in the U.S. as a junior in high school. Hernandez played youth u17 and u18 in Hayward, California. His senior year, San Jose State soccer coach Jules Menendez approached Hernandez about playing for him. Hernandez agreed and Menendez became a second father to him. In 1968, the Spartans went to the NCAA Final Four before falling to eventual co-champions Maryland. That year, Hernandez was selected as a first team All American and the 1968 Hermann Trophy recipient as the top collegiate player of the year.

=== Club career ===
Following college, Hernandez spent several years with San Francisco semi-pro teams. In 1974, the North American Soccer League (NASL) established a franchise in San Jose, naming it the San Jose Earthquakes. The Earthquakes signed Hernandez. On 5 May 1974, Hernandez scored the first ever point for a San Jose professional sports franchise when he scored against the Vancouver Whitecaps seven minutes into the match. He spent three season with the ‘Quakes, 1974–1976. In 1979, he signed with the Detroit Lightning of the Major Indoor Soccer League. After one season, he moved to the San Francisco Fog.

=== Olympics and national teams ===
In 1970, Hernandez represented the United States Olympic Team at the Pan-American games, Hernandez scored two goals against Bermuda which allow them to go into the second round of competition for the first time in the history of the tournament. In 1972, Hernandez was selected for the U.S. Olympic Team as it began the qualification process for the 1972 Summer Olympics. Hernandez scored one of the two goals in the U.S. victory over Jamaica which put the U.S. into the tournament. Hernandez earned two caps with the U.S. national team in 1974, both losses to Mexico.

== Coach ==
In 1976, Hernandez coached Leland High School (San Jose, California) varsity men's soccer team to its first Central Coast Section championship and in 1982, Hernandez was also the assistant coach at San Jose State men's soccer. Hernandez coached the Gunderson High School (San Jose, California) varsity men's soccer team to its first Central Coast Section playoff berth, beating previous Central Coastal Sectional champion Watsonville HS 11–1 in a 1st-round match. In 1983, Presentation High School in San Jose hired Hernandez, becoming the head coach of the girls' varsity soccer team. Over the decades since then, he has taken Presentation to seventeen league championships and eight Central Coast Sectional titles. Aly Wagner and Danielle Slaton are among the players Hernandez has coached at Presentation.
