= Cincinnati Kids =

Soccer team in Ohio, U.S.

- Founded: 1978
- Dissolved: 1979
- Ground: Riverfront Coliseum
- Owner: Pete Rose
- Manager: Len Bilous
- League: Major Indoor Soccer League

The Cincinnati Kids were an indoor soccer team based out of Cincinnati that played in the original Major Indoor Soccer League. Partially owned by Pete Rose, the team played only in the 1978–79 MISL season. Their home arena was Riverfront Coliseum. In the Kids' only season in Cincinnati the average attendance was 3,191 per game.

== Personnel ==
- Owner: (United States) Pete Rose
- Head coach: (United States) Len Bilous

== 1979 home schedule ==
- December 27, 1978 – vs Philadelphia Fever
- January 5, 1979 – vs New York Arrows
- January 7, 1979 – vs Houston Summit
- January 14, 1979 – vs Cleveland Force
- January 25, 1979 – vs Pittsburgh Spirit
- February 6, 1979 – vs Pittsburgh Spirit
- February 10, 1979 – vs Moscow Spartak
- February 13, 1979 – vs Houston Summit
- March 3, 1979 – vs Houston Summit
- March 4, 1979 – vs Cleveland Force
- March 10, 1979 – vs Philadelphia Fever
- March 18, 1979 – vs Pittsburgh Spirit

== In popular culture ==
The Cincinnati Kids are referenced in "Sparky", an episode of the TV show WKRP in Cincinnati which guest-starred baseball great Sparky Anderson as himself. Anderson is hired by the station as host of a new sports talk radio program, and his first guest is the captain of the Cincinnati Kids, Derek Doogle, played by Andrew Bloch. The episode first aired December 24, 1979 after the team had folded.
