= Ilija Mitić =

American soccer player (1940–2023)

Personal information
- Date of birth: July 19, 1940
- Place of birth: Grkinja, Kingdom of Yugoslavia
- Date of death: September 2, 2023 (aged 83)
- Place of death: San Francisco, California, United States
- Height: 5 ft 10 in (1.78 m)
- Position: Midfielder

Senior career*
Years	Team	Apps	(Gls)
1958–1963	Partizan	36	(3)
1963–1965	Bor		
1965–1967	OFK Beograd	31	(3)
1967–1968	Oakland Clippers	47	(31)
1969	Dallas Tornado	12	(11)
1969–1970	Marseille	6	(1)
1970–1971	Holland Sport	12	(1)
1971–1973	FC Den Bosch	46	(10)
1973–1975	Dallas Tornado	40	(24)
1975–1978	San Jose Earthquakes	67	(36)

International career
	Yugoslavia U21	2	(0)
1973	United States	1	(0)
- * Club domestic league appearances and goals

Ilija Mitić (Serbian Cyrillic: Илија Митић; July 19, 1940 – September 2, 2023) was a professional soccer player. Born in Yugoslavia, he represented the United States internationally.

== Career ==
Mitić played with Partizan with whom he won the Yugoslav First League title three times. Earning two under-21 caps, he later joined OFK Beograd.

Mitić signed with the Oakland Clippers of the newly formed National Professional Soccer League in 1967, won the league title, and was named to the NPSL's Best XI team. In the off-season, the NPSL merged with the United Soccer Association to form the NASL. With the Clippers he was the NASL's third leading scorer in 1968 and again a Best XI selection. Mitić joined the Dallas Tornado as the Clippers folded and was named a Best XI for the third consecutive year in 1969. Converting from forward to midfielder, Mitić was also chosen as an NASL Best XI in 1973 and 1974. He played indoor soccer for the Tornado as well, and was named to the All-Tournament team in 1975.

Mitić was the first soccer player to score 100 goals in the NASL which he achieved in July 1978 against the Memphis Rogues. He finished his NASL career with the San Jose Earthquakes and is the league's sixth all-time leading goal scorer with 239 points in 166 games, including 101 goals.

He played one 'A' international for the United States national team, on August 10, 1973, at Candlestick Park, as the U.S. lost to Poland 4–0 in a friendly.

== Death ==
Mitić died on September 2, 2023, at the age of 83.

== Honors ==
Partizan

- Yugoslav First League: 1960–61, 1961–62, 1962–63

OFK Beograd

- Yugoslav Cup: 1965–66
