= Buzz Demling =

American soccer player

Personal information
- Full name: Arthur Michael Demling
- Date of birth: September 21, 1948 (age 78)
- Place of birth: St. Louis, Missouri, United States
- Height: 5 ft 11 in (1.80 m)
- Position: Defender

Youth career
- 1970: Michigan State University

Senior career*
Years	Team	Apps	(Gls)
1973	St. Louis Stars	18	(1)
1974–1978	San Jose Earthquakes	97	(1)
1978–1979	Cincinnati Kids (indoor)	23	(11)
1979–1980	Detroit Lightning (indoor)	25	(0)
1980–1981	San Francisco Fog (indoor)	33	(1)
Total		196	(14)

International career
1973–1975	United States	4	(0)

Managerial career
- 1989–1990: Lindenwood
- * Club domestic league appearances and goals

Arthur "Art" or "Buzz" Demling is a former U.S. soccer defender who played in the North American Soccer League and the Major Indoor Soccer League. He was a member of the U.S. soccer team at the 1972 Summer Olympics. He also earned four caps with the U.S. national team between 1973 and 1975.

== College ==
Demling grew up in St. Louis, Missouri, where he attended St. Louis University High School. After high school, he attended Michigan State University. In 1970, he was named a first team All American.

== Professional ==
In 1973, Demling signed with the St. Louis Stars of the North American Soccer League (NASL). However, he lasted only one season before moving to the expansion San Jose Earthquakes. He played five seasons in California before leaving the NASL. In 1978, Demling moved to the Major Indoor Soccer League (MISL) and signed with the Cincinnati Kids. The Kids folded at the end of the season. Demling played the 1980–1981 MISL season with the San Francisco Fog.

== National and Olympic teams ==
=== Olympics ===
Demling was selected for the U.S. soccer team at the 1972 Summer Olympics. The U.S. went 0–2–1. Demling played in the third U.S. game of the tournament, a 7–0 loss to West Germany.

=== National team ===
Demling earned four caps with the U.S. national team between 1973 and 1975. His first cap came on August 12, 1973, in a 1–0 victory over Poland. He played one game in 1974 and two more in 1975. His last cap came on March 26, 1975, against Poland. Unlike his debut match, this one ended in a 7–0 loss for the U.S.

== Coaching career ==
He coached Lindenwood Lions men's soccer.
