= Davie Kemp =

Scottish footballer

Personal information
- Date of birth: 5 August 1950 (age 76)
- Place of birth: Dundee, Scotland
- Position: Midfielder

Senior career*
Years	Team	Apps	(Gls)
1974–1978	San Jose Earthquakes	96	(0)
1980–1981	San Francisco Fog (indoor)	38	(8)
1982–1983	Golden Bay Earthquakes (indoor)	9	(2)
- * Club domestic league appearances and goals

Davie Kemp is a Scottish retired Association football midfielder who played five seasons in the North American Soccer League (NASL) and two in the Major Indoor Soccer League (MISL).

== Early life ==
Kemp was born and raised in Dundee, Scotland. While initially recruited by professional English football clubs as a youth, he chose to stay with his electrical engineering apprenticeship. His sister who had previously emigrated to California would write to Kemp about the area, and so decided to move to the San Francisco Bay Area in 1971.

== Club career ==
Kemp played with amateur and semi-professional football teams such as the San Francisco Scots and San Jose Lobos before becoming a professional player. The Lobos were owned by Milan Mandarić, who also owned Lika Corp., a printed circuit boards manufacturer. Mandarić offered both a role at the company as well as a try-out with the brand new San Jose Earthquakes to Kemp.

Kemp was signed to the San Jose Earthquakes for the team's inaugural 1974 NASL season. He played for both their indoor and outdoor squads over the following years. Kemp signed a new contract with the Earthquakes in January of 1979, but ultimately would retire the following month. Kemp would maintain a community relations role with the Quakes, but cited his role as a president of an electronics corporation would not allow him the time to play.

Kemp would come out of retirement in 1980, being among former Earthquakes signed by the club ahead of their 1980 season as they needed squad depth, and was subsequently released in mid-April 1980. He would have a proper return to professional indoor football joining the newly formed San Francisco Fog in MISL, announced as their fifth signing on 29 June 1980.

Kemp was among the alumni who played in the San Jose Earthquakes' "10th Anniversary Reunion Game" against the Golden Bay Earthquakes 1984 NASL squad.

The MLS incarnation of the San Jose Earthquakes named Kemp among the "50 Greatest Quakes" during their 2024 season, 50 years since the founding of the NASL incarnation of the Earthquakes.

== Honours ==
- San Jose Earthquakes
  - NASL Indoor Tournament Championship: 1975
- Individual
  - San Jose Earthquakes 50 Greatest Quakes: 2025
