= Momčilo Gavrić (footballer) =

Yugoslavian-born American football and soccer player (1938–2010)

Profile
- Positions: K defender, left back

Personal information
- Born: August 4, 1938; Sinj, Kingdom of Yugoslavia
- Died: March 13, 2010 (aged 71); San Jose, California, United States

Career information
- College: University of Belgrade

Career history
- 1969: San Francisco 49ers
- 1969: Portland Loggers
- Stats at Pro Football Reference

Momčilo "Gabbo" Gavrić (August 4, 1938 – March 13, 2010) was a Yugoslavian-born football player.

== Club career ==
Born in Sinj, Croatia, Gavric aspired to play professional soccer and played in his hometown club NK Junak Sinj. In 1959, he moved to Belgrade, then Yugoslav capital, and began playing with Yugoslav First League side OFK Beograd. He had call-ups to the national team, but only ended up playing for the B national team. He left Yugoslavia in 1967 and moved to the United States. In 1967, he signed with the Oakland Clippers of the North American Soccer League. Gavrić spent two seasons with the Clippers and won the 1967 championship with them. He was also an NFL placekicker for the San Francisco 49ers in 1969. In 1971, he moved to the Dallas Tornado, then on to the San Jose Earthquakes from 1974 to 1978. In 1975, Gabbo Gavrić was the co-MVP of the NASL indoor tournament and named to the All-tournament team. He was a player and coach at San Jose until 1976, and he continued to coach through 1978.

== Death ==
Gavric died on March 13, 2010, of complications from Parkinson's disease.

== Clubs ==
- NK Junak Sinj 1957–59
- OFK Belgrade 1959–67
- Oakland Clippers 1967–69
- San Francisco 49ers 1969
- Portland Loggers 1969
- Dallas Tornado 1971
- San Jose Earthquakes 1974–78
