= Johnny Moore (soccer) =

Scottish-American soccer player

Personal information
- Date of birth: August 28, 1947 (age 79)
- Place of birth: Glasgow, Scotland
- Positions: Midfielder; forward

Senior career*
Years	Team	Apps	(Gls)
1974–1977	San Jose Earthquakes	63	(8)
1978	Oakland Stompers	7	(1)
1979–1980	Detroit Lightning (indoor)	24	(22)
1980–1981	San Francisco Fog (indoor)	40	(32)
1981–1982	Kansas City Comets (indoor)	1	(1)
1982	Phoenix Inferno (indoor)	21	(3)

International career
1972–1975	United States	11	(0)

Managerial career
- 1980–1981: San Francisco Fog
- 1982–1983: San Jose Earthquakes (MISL) (assistant coach)
- 2002–2003: San Jose Earthquakes (MLS) (general manager)
- * Club domestic league appearances and goals

Johnny Moore (born August 28, 1947) is a former Scottish-American soccer player who spent several years in the North American Soccer League and Major Indoor Soccer League. He has also served in various administrative positions, including general manager of the San Jose Earthquakes of Major League Soccer. Moore also earned eleven caps with the U.S. national team. In 1997, he was inducted into the National Soccer Hall of Fame.

== Early life ==
Moore moved to the San Francisco Bay Area in 1965. As a young boy he played for E. Berkovich & Sons, Hayward United, The San Francisco Scots, San Francisco Greek-American, and Tri Valley Soccer Club. He quickly established himself in the youth soccer culture, joining the Ballistic United Soccer Club as an assistant coach.

== NASL ==
In 1969, the Oakland Clippers of the North American Soccer League (NASL) invited Moore to play on a final European tour, with the team disbanding shortly afterwards. He would return to playing for the Scots and the Greeks.

In 1974, the San Jose Earthquakes of NASL signed Moore as the team's first player. Moore spent four seasons with the Earthquakes playing in both the midfield and as a forward. In addition to his playing field duties, Moore served as the Earthquakes assistant general manager from 1974 to 1976. In 1977, he was elevated to the position of general manager and team Vice President. However, at the end of the season, the Earthquakes made Moore a free agent as a player and he signed for the Oakland Stompers for the 1978 season.

His lifelong dream was to play for Celtic FC from his hometown of Glasgow in Scotland, but that never materialized. He was instrumental, however, in having one of his Celtic heroes, Jimmy 'Jinky' Johnstone, join the San Jose Earthquakes.

== MISL ==
In 1979, Moore joined Detroit Lightning for its first and only year in existence. At the end of the 1979–1980 season, David Schoenstadt bought the team and moved it to San Francisco, California, renaming the team the San Francisco Fog. After only one dismal season in California, Schoenstadt moved it again, this time to Kansas City, Missouri where he renamed the team the Kansas City Comets. Moore remained with the team through both moves and name changes, even coaching the Fog during the 1980–1981 season. While the team was last in the league standings, that season was Moore's most productive one, as he scored 32 goals in 40 games. He also suffered a concussion, which led to his wearing a helmet. He began his final season in MISL with the Comets but was traded to the Phoenix Inferno. Moore retired from playing professionally in 1982. During his three seasons in MISL, he was a two-time second team All-Star.

After retiring from playing, Moore returned to the San Francisco area and served as an assistant coach to Roger Thomson for the San Jose Earthquakes during the team's 1982-1983 MISL season. The NASL had run an indoor schedule in 1981-1982 but had decided not to have a 1982-1983 indoor schedule. As a result, the Earthquakes played in MISL that season.

== National team ==
Moore earned his first cap with the U.S. national team in an August 20, 1972 loss to Canada. He became a regular starter for the U.S. as it ran through its failed qualification bid for the 1974 FIFA World Cup. His last cap came on August 25, 1975, in a loss to Mexico, just as his professional club career was beginning.

== General manager of the Earthquakes ==
On February 8, 2002, the San Jose Earthquakes of Major League Soccer hired Moore as the team's general manager. He remained with the team for two years, gaining a reputation for building a solid fan base. The Earthquakes reached the Playoffs in both years and won the MLS Cup in 2003. On January 12, 2004, Moore resigned as the Earthquakes’ owners contemplated moving the franchise to Houston.

== Non-soccer venture ==
Moore has also served as a sales executive with Apple and was the Vice President of Sales at Noah Software. He has also served as a business development manager for Workscape. In 1997, Moore was inducted into both the California Soccer Hall of Fame and the National Soccer Hall of Fame. He had been previously inducted into the California Youth Soccer Hall of Fame in 1995 and was inducted into the San Jose Earthquakes Hall of Fame on May 10, 2014.

== See also ==
- List of United States men's international soccer players born outside the United States
