= Oakland Stompers =

American soccer team

- Full name: Oakland Stompers
- Nickname: Stompers
- Founded: 1978; 47 years ago
- Dissolved: 1978; 47 years ago
- Stadium: Oakland–Alameda County Coliseum
- Capacity: 50,000
- Chairman: Milan Mandarić
- General Manager: Dick Berg
- League: NASL
Home colors	Away colors

The Oakland Stompers were a soccer team based out of Oakland, California that played the 1978 season in the North American Soccer League (NASL). The Stompers played in the Western Division of the American Conference and finished the year with a 12–18 record, in third place and out of playoff contention.

The name is also used by a National Premier Soccer League club, active since 2021.

== Team history ==
At the end of the 1977 NASL season, Silicon Valley businessman (and former owner of the San Jose Earthquakes) Milan Mandarić bought the Connecticut Bicentennials and relocated them to Oakland. The club, renamed the Stompers, hired Mirko Stojanović as head coach and signed a 10-year lease at the Oakland–Alameda County Coliseum, previously home of the NASL's Oakland Clippers in 1967–68. The team signed Shep Messing for $100,000 making him the highest-paid American soccer player at the time.

The club drew 32,104 in their home opener against cross-Bay rivals San Jose Earthquakes on April 2, 1978, with about half of those in attendance being supporters of the visiting team. (At the time, it was the largest crowd ever to see a club soccer match in California.) After eight games and a record of 4-4, the team fired Stojanović and replaced him on an interim basis with Jack Hyde. Hyde was in turn replaced by Ken Bracewell who had previously coached the Denver Dynamos. In July, the team was averaging 12,200 fan in attendance, but ended the season in third place and with a slight dip in attendance, 11,929 fans at seasons end. (The Coliseum was a lonely place in the summer of '78: the Stompers' co-tenants, baseball's Oakland Athletics, attracted just 7,218 fans per home date.)

Following the season, the team moved to Edmonton, Alberta where they were renamed the Edmonton Drillers.

== Year-by-year ==
Year	League	W	L	Pts	Regular season	Playoffs	Avg. Attend.	Ref
1978	NASL	12	18	103	3rd, American Conference, Western Division	Did not qualify	11,929	

== Honors ==
U.S. Soccer Hall of Fame

- 1997: Johnny Moore

Canada Soccer Hall of Fame

- 2008: Bruce Twamley

Indoor Soccer Hall of Fame

- 2019: Shep Messing

== Coaches ==
- (Socialist Federal Republic of Yugoslavia) Mirko Stojanović
- (England) Ken Bracewell
