= Paul Child (soccer) =

English-American association football player (born 1952)

Personal information
- Date of birth: December 8, 1952 (age 73)
- Place of birth: Birmingham, England
- Position: Forward

Youth career
- 1966–1972: Aston Villa

Senior career*
Years	Team	Apps	(Gls)
1972–1973	Aston Villa	0	(0)
1972	→ Atlanta Chiefs (loan)	12	(8)
1973	Atlanta Apollos	16	(8)
1974–1979	San Jose Earthquakes	149	(61)
1975	San Jose Earthquakes (indoor)	4	(7)
1980	Memphis Rogues	31	(12)
1980–1981	Atlanta Chiefs (indoor)	15	(13)
1981	Atlanta Chiefs	31	(13)
1981–1986	Pittsburgh Spirit (indoor)	133	(140)
1982	Carolina Lightnin'		
1986–1987	Baltimore Blast (indoor)	52	(29)
1987–1988	Los Angeles Lazers (indoor)	55	(40)
- Pittsburgh Beadling

International career
1971	England Youth	2	(0)
1973	United States	2	(0)

Managerial career
- 1994–1995: Pittsburgh Stingers (indoor)
- 1995–1997: Detroit Neon (indoor)
- 1998–2002: Pittsburgh Riverhounds (assistant)
- 2005–200?: Pittsburgh Riverhounds (assistant)
- * Club domestic league appearances and goals

Paul Child (born December 8, 1952) is an English-American former soccer player who played as a forward, spending nine seasons in the North American Soccer League. He led the league in scoring in 1974 and was a two-time first team All-Star. He also earned two caps with the United States national team in 1973. He is a member of the National Soccer Hall of Fame.

== Club career ==
=== England ===
Born in Birmingham, England, Child signed with English First Division club Aston Villa when he turned fourteen in 1966. He remained with the club for the next six seasons but never made a first-team appearance. In 1972 the nineteen-year-old Child was loaned to the Atlanta Chiefs of the North American Soccer League.

=== United States ===
When Child arrived in Atlanta during the 1972 NASL season, he promptly scored eight goals in twelve games and was named a first team All Star. The Chiefs then purchased Child's contract from Villa. In 1973, the team became known as the Atlanta Apollos. In 1974, the Apollo traded Child to the expansion San Jose Earthquakes where he led the league in scoring with fifteen goals and six assists. In 1975, the NASL ran an indoor tournament during the 1974-1975 off season. The Earthquakes won the title and Child led the scoring, gaining MVP honors, with seven goals in four games. He was selected as a first team All Star for his second time that year. Child remained with the Earthquakes until 1980 when the team sold his contract to the Memphis Rogues. He scored twelve goals that year. The Rogues moved to Calgary, Canada during the off-season, but Child did not move with the team. Instead, he returned to the team with which he began his NASL career, the Atlanta Chiefs. The 1981 NASL season was Child's last in the league, which was in decline by this time. He scored thirteen goals, aided another eight, then left the league to devote himself to his indoor career. In 1982, Child returned to outdoor soccer with the Carolina Lightnin' of the American Soccer League (ASL). The Lightnin', coached by Rodney Marsh, went to the ASL semifinals that year. In 1981, Child signed with the Pittsburgh Spirit of Major Indoor Soccer League (MISL). He was a prolific scorer during his first three years with the team, scoring 140 goals in 133 games. In 1986, the Spirit folded and Child moved to the Baltimore Blast for one season. He then signed as a free agent with the Los Angeles Lazers for the 1987–1988 season. Child later played for the amateur Pittsburgh Beadling.

== International career ==
Child earned two caps with the U.S. national team in 1973 despite not yet having his U.S. citizenship. His first cap came in a 2–0 win over Canada on August 5, 1973. He played again seven days later in a 1–0 win over Poland. He began the game, then came out for Kyle Rote, Jr.

== Coaching career ==
In 1995, Child became the head coach of the Detroit Neon of the Continental Indoor Soccer League (CISL). He was fired after the team started 2–16 in 1997, its final season. On October 5, 1998, the A-League Pittsburgh Riverhounds hired Child as the team's director of youth development. A month later, he was named as the team's assistant coach. After the Riverhounds fired coach John Kowalski in 2001, Child served as interim head coach until the hiring of Kai Haaskivi. Child was fired in 2002, then rehired on December 15, 2005, as an assistant coach.

He is currently coach of a youth team composed of young refugees, BW United, in suburban Pittsburgh.

== Post soccer career ==
Aside from working with the Riverhounds, Child is a project manager at the Allegheny Millworks in the Pittsburgh area.

In 2003, Child was inducted into the National Soccer Hall of Fame. In 2013, Child was inducted into the San Jose Earthquakes Hall of Fame. Child was also inducted into the Pittsburgh Riverhounds hall of fame in 2024. https://www.riverhounds.com/news/2024/07/04/hall-of-fame-profile-paul-child/

== Honors ==
NASL Leading Scorer: 1974

NASL First Team All Star: 1972, 1974

NASL Indoor MVP: 1975

NASL Indoor Leading Scorer: 1975
