= Mark Demling =

American soccer player

Personal information
- Date of birth: October 4, 1951 (age 75)
- Place of birth: St. Louis, Missouri, U.S.
- Position: Defender

Youth career
- St. Philip Neri

College career
Years	Team	Apps	(Gls)
1970–1973	Saint Louis Billikens		

Senior career*
Years	Team	Apps	(Gls)
1974–1978	San Jose Earthquakes	42	(1)
1978–1979	San Diego Sockers	13	(1)
1980	San Jose Earthquakes	1	(0)
1980–1981	San Francisco Fog (indoor)	35	(0)
Total		91	(2)
- * Club domestic league appearances and goals

Mark Demling is an American retired soccer defender who currently coaches high school soccer. Demling spent seven seasons in the North American Soccer League and one in Major Indoor Soccer League.

== Youth and college ==
Demling grew up in St. Louis, Missouri beginning to play soccer when he was seven at St. Thomas More parish in the C.Y.C. league. He played Junior soccer for St. Philip Neri winning the National Junior Cup title in the 1968–69 season. He attended St. Louis University High School, graduating in 1970. He then entered Saint Louis University where he played on the men's soccer team from 1970 to 1973. He immediately made an impact on the team, becoming a starter his freshman season. That year, the Billikens won the NCAA Men's Soccer Championship. St. Louis U would lose in the NCAA final in 1971. The team repeated as champions in 1972 and 1973, the last season with Demling as team captain. The Billikens have named an annual award after Demling, given to the soccer player who gives his most to the team. St. Louis University inducted Demling into its Hall of Fame in 1999.

== Club career ==
In 1973, the expansion San Jose Earthquakes of the North American Soccer League (NASL) selected Demling with its first draft pick. He played from 1974 to 1978 with the Earthquakes. However, he lost the entire 1975 season due to a broken leg suffered in the 1975 NASL Indoor Final. In 1978, the Earthquakes traded Demling to the San Diego Sockers after only two games. While he then played twelve games with the Sockers through the remainder of the 1978 season, he saw time in only one game in 1979. In 1980, he was back in San Jose where he played a single game with the Earthquakes. In 1980, he left the NASL and signed with the San Francisco Fog of the Major Indoor Soccer League (MISL). The Fog lasted only one season before moving to Kansas City to become the Kansas City Comets.

== Post-playing career ==
=== Sports clothing ===
After retiring from the Fog, Demling entered the apparel industry. He has sold soccer shoes and clothing for Nike and Patrick sportswear. He has also managed a shoe distribution center in Hayward, California.

=== Broadcaster ===
Demling has also served as a radio and television soccer broadcaster. In 1996, he was hired to provide TV commentary for the San Jose Clash.

=== Coaching ===
In 1999, Demling coached eighth-grade soccer at Blach Junior High School in Los Altos, California, taking the team to the Valley Junior High School Athletic League championship. On May 9, 2000, St. Francis High School hired Demling as its boys' soccer coach.
