= Detroit Lightning =

The Detroit Lightning was a Major Indoor Soccer League franchise which existed for only one season, 1979–1980. The Lightning finished that season at 15–17. The team's home arena was Cobo Arena.

On May 28, 1980, at the end of the 1979–1980 season, David Schoenstadt bought the Lightning and moved the team from Detroit, Michigan to San Francisco, California where he renamed the team the San Francisco Fog.

== Owners ==
- (United States) Norman Lear
- (United States) Jerry Perenchio

== Staff ==
- (United States) Lynne Saunders – President and general manager
- (United States) Terry Fisher – Head coach
- (Netherlands) Klaas de Boer – Assistant coach
- (United States) Jack Nida - Operations assistant

== Record ==
Year	Record	Regular season	Playoffs	Avg. attendance
1979–1980	15–17	3rd Central Division	1st Round	3,520

== Honors ==
First Team All MISL

- 1979–1980 Flemming Lund
