= Soccer Bowl '82 =

Championship final of the 1982 NASL season

- Event: Soccer Bowl
New York Cosmos	Seattle Sounders
1	0
- Date: September 18, 1982
- Venue: Jack Murphy Stadium, San Diego, California
- Man of the Match: Giorgio Chinaglia
- Referee: David Socha (United States)
- Attendance: 22,634

Soccer Bowl '82 was the championship final of the 1982 NASL season. The New York Cosmos advanced to the Soccer Bowl for the third consecutive year and took on the Seattle Sounders in a rematch of Soccer Bowl '77. The match was played on September 18, 1982, at Jack Murphy Stadium, in San Diego, California. New York won, 1–0, and were crowned the 1982 NASL champions. This was the Cosmos' fifth North American championship and fourth in the past six years.

== Background ==
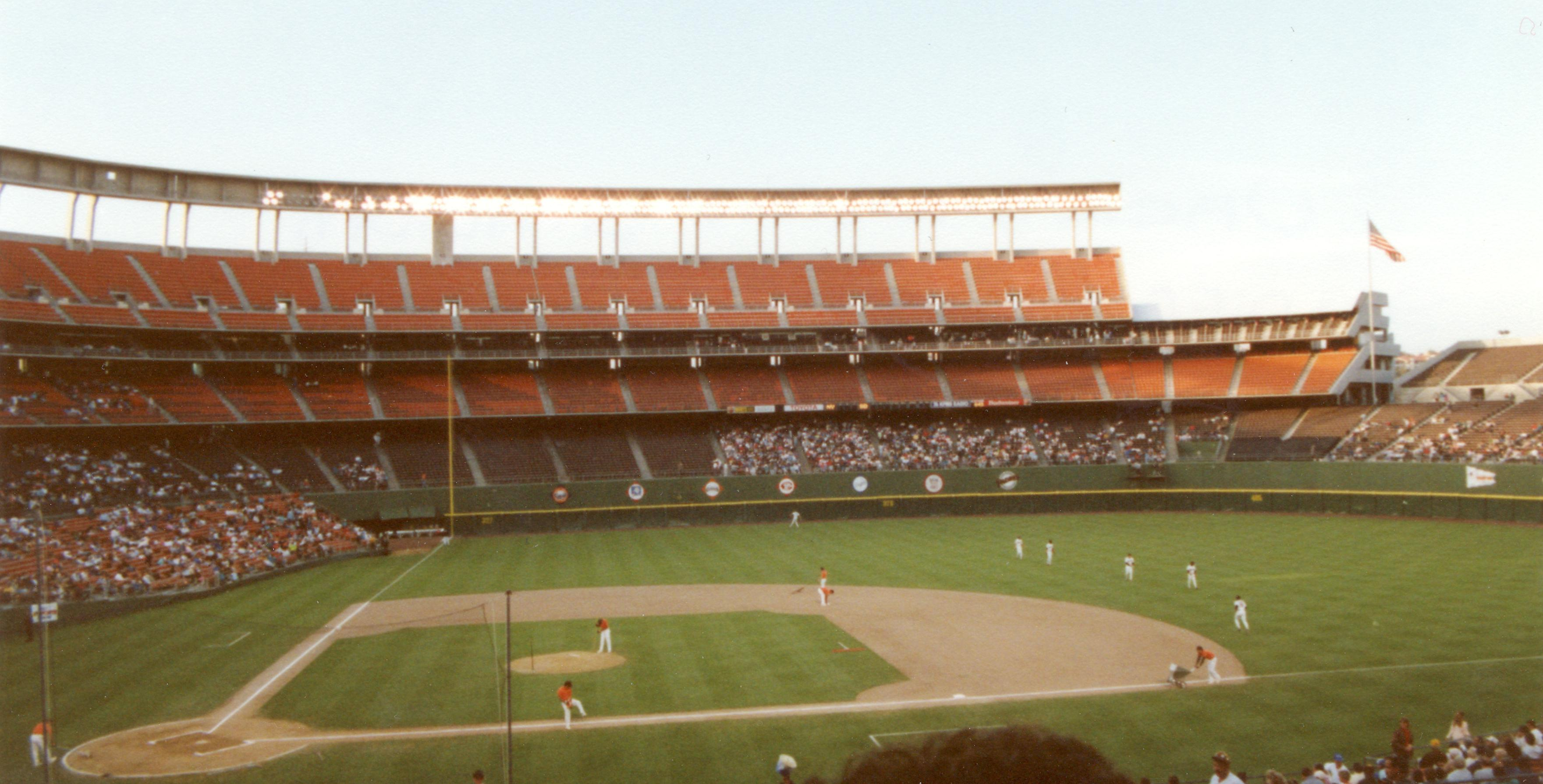
Jack Murphy Stadium was the venue for Soccer Bowl '82

=== New York Cosmos ===
The New York Cosmos won the Eastern Division with a 23-9 record and a total of 203 points. They defeated the Tulsa Roughnecks in the quarterfinals by two game to one. By virtue of their two-game sweep in the semifinals against the San Diego Sockers, the Cosmos advanced to the NASL championship final for the sixth time in franchise history.

=== Seattle Sounders ===
The Seattle Sounders qualified for the playoffs as the Western Division champions with an 18-14 record and a total of 166 points. In the quarterfinals they needed all three games to get past the Toronto Blizzard. Likewise their semifinal match-up took three games to decide a winner. Seattle's two games to one defeat of the Fort Lauderdale Strikers earned the Sounders their second ever trip to the Soccer Bowl.

== Game summary ==
Usual Cosmos starters Steve Moyers, Johan Neeskens and Wim Rijsbergen were injured and unavailable for the match. Seattle dominated the first half outshooting New York, 10–5. Numerous Sounders' chances were either squandered with shots slightly off the mark, or gobbled up by Cosmos goalie, Hubert Birkenmeier. In the 31st minute, and against the run of play, New York sweeper, Carlos Alberto, picked up the ball in midfield and passed it to Julio César Romero. Romero slid the ball to Giorgio Chinaglia on the right side of the penalty area. With his back to goal and using his body to shield the ball, the Cosmos' captain maneuvered to his leftaround Seattle defender, Benny Dargle, and from 12 yards out shot to the left. Goalkeeper Paul Hammond got a piece of it, but the ball nevertheless caromed just inside the left post for the game's only goal. The second half saw considerably less action with New York content to protect their slim lead.

== Match details ==
September 18, 1982
6:00 p.m. (PDT)

New York Cosmos	1–0	Seattle Sounders
Chinaglia 31'	Report

Jack Murphy Stadium, San Diego
Attendance: 22,634
Referee: David Socha (United States)

NY Cosmos	Seattle Sounders

GK	1	(Germany) Hubert Birkenmeier
DF	2	(Iran) Andranik Eskandarian
DF	4	(United States) Jeff Durgan
DF	5	(Brazil) Carlos Alberto
DF	18	(United States) Boris Bandov
MF	8	(Socialist Federal Republic of Yugoslavia) Vladislav Bogićević
MF	7	(Paraguay) Julio César Romero
MF	6	(United States) Rick Davis
MF	17	(England) Steve Hunt
FW	19	(Paraguay) Roberto Cabañas	(substituted off) 71'
FW	9	(Italy) Giorgio Chinaglia (c)
Substitutes:
MF	14	(South Africa) Steve Wegerle	(substituted on) 71'
DF	3	(Canada) Robert Iarusci
FW	11	(Portugal) Seninho
GK	21	(United States) David Brcic
Manager:
(Brazil) Júlio Mazzei

GK	1	(England) Paul Hammond
DF	13	(England) Nicky Reid
DF	14	(United States) Benny Dargle
DF	2	(England) Ray Evans
DF	16	(United States) Jeff Stock
MF	3	(England) Kenny Hibbitt
MF	11	(England) Gary Mills	(substituted off) 60'
MF	4	(England) Alan Hudson (c)
MF	10	(England) Steve Daley
FW	9	(England) Peter Ward
FW	7	(United States) Mark Peterson	(substituted off) 60'
Substitutes:
DF	5	(Canada) Ian Bridge	(substituted on) 60'
FW	8	(England) Roger Davies	(substituted on) 60'
Manager:
(England) Alan Hinton

1982 NASL Champions: New York Cosmos

Soccer Bowl MVP:
Giorgio Chinaglia (New York)
Assistant referees:
Robert Evans
Robert Allen

Television: USA Network (cable)
Announcers: Spencer Ross, Werner Roth

== Match statistics ==
First Half
Statistic	New York	Seattle
Goals scored	1	0
Total shots	5	10
Shots on target	3	3
Saves	3	2
Corner kicks	0	5

Second Half
Statistic	New York	Seattle
Goals scored	0	0
Total shots	13	3
Shots on target	2	0
Saves	0	2
Corner kicks	5	2

Overall Totals
Statistic	New York	Seattle
Goals scored	1	0
Total shots	18	13
Shots on target	5	3
Saves	3	4
Corner kicks	5	7

== See also ==
- 1982 North American Soccer League season
