= Team America (NASL) =

Defunct American soccer club

- Full name: Team America
- Nickname: Team America
- Founded: 1983
- Dissolved: 1983
- Stadium: RFK Stadium, Washington, D.C.
- Capacity: 55,677
- League: North American Soccer League
- 1983: 10–20, Last Place
Home colors	Away colors

Team America was a professional version of the United States men's national soccer team which played as a franchise in the North American Soccer League (NASL) during the 1983 season. The team was based in Washington, D.C., played its home games at RFK Stadium, and was intended by the NASL and the United States Soccer Federation to build fan support for the league and create a cohesive and internationally competitive national team. However, the team finished in last place and drew only 13,000 fans per game.

A "Team America" also played an unofficial exhibition game against England in 1976, to commemorate the bicentennial of American Independence. The players were drawn from North American Soccer League clubs and included Pelé and Bobby Moore. The match was played in Philadelphia and England won, 3–1.

== History ==
=== Origins ===
First logo used.

The origins of Team America came with the ascension of Howard J. Samuels to the positions of president and CEO of NASL on June 25, 1982. At the time, the league was on the verge of collapsing. The league had 21 teams at the end of the 1981 season, but began the 1982 season with only 14. Attendance was dropping and the league had lost its television contract. To reverse these trends, Samuels proposed turning the league’s focus away from international stars to domestic players in order to create a larger fan base. Samuels’ concept dovetailed with a desire on the part of the United States Soccer Federation (USSF) to build a more successful national team program. In order to fulfill the twin objectives of nurturing new U.S. talent to reach a greater fan base while feeding that talent into the national team, Samuels and the USSF decided to enter the national team into NASL as a franchise. At the time, U.S. players found it difficult to compete for roster spots against the foreigners who stocked most of the league’s teams. In theory, Team America would only feature U.S. players who would train with each other, fostering a sense of team cohesion which would pay dividends when the U.S. played international games. The name Team America was a reference to both the U.S. national team as well as the 1976 Team America, a team which combined U.S. national team players with the addition of several NASL international stars, which played in the 1976 U.S.A. Bicentennial Cup Tournament.

=== Creating the team ===
Samuels brought in Robert Lifton as the team owner, and in coordination with Lifton and USSF secured RFK Stadium in Washington, D.C. as the team’s home field. In January 1983, the NASL and USSF invited 39 players from the NASL, American Soccer League (ASL) and Major Indoor Soccer League (MISL) to tryouts for the 20 available roster spots. However, several top U.S. players, including Rick Davis, Jimmy McAllister, Winston DuBose, David Brcic, and Juli Veee, refused to leave their teams to play for Team America. This forced the NASL and USSF to turn to recently naturalized players—ten of the 21 on the roster (see below) had been born outside the U.S., including Alan Green, who was still a British subject in 1983 (he finally gained American citizenship the following year). Several top U.S. players did join the club, including Chico Borja, Jeff Durgan, Arnie Mausser and Perry Van der Beck. Even Alketas Panagoulias, U.S. national team coach (and thus Team America coach by default) was himself a naturalized citizen. (Panagoulis had led the New York Greek-Americans to three U.S. Open Cup triumphs in the early 1960s and was later coach of the Greece national team at the 1994 World Cup, but earned his living selling real estate.)

=== Season ===
Wearing a red, white and blue uniform with a horizontally striped jersey, the team began well, going 8–5 (including a shootout win over the Cosmos in front of 31,112 at RFK on June 17) but lost 15 of its last 17 games, finishing at the bottom of the standings with a 10–20 record. (There was one highlight, however: on August 13, the club played to a 1–1 tie with the mighty Italian club Juventus (which featured six players from the 1982 World Cup-winning squad), in front of 20,111 fans at RFK.)

Lack of scoring punch was the biggest problem: the club scored just five goals in the entire month of July, losing all eight matches; Team America's 33 goals on the season was barely one per game and easily the worst in the league. None of the players were named to the league's All Star team. As the team stumbled through the regular season, Samuels and Lifton became desperate. On July 27, 1983, they announced that they had approached the owners of the other NASL, as well as MISL, teams about loaning U.S. players to Team America on a game by game basis when the players' regular teams had an idle game day. However, MISL refused the NASL/USSF request for player loans, citing the NASL policy forbidding teams in that league from loaning its players to MISL.

Lack of success on the field led to tensions among U.S. national team players. Some, such as Jeff Durgan, publicly criticized Rick Davis and Steve Moyers for choosing to remain with the Cosmos rather than signing with Team America. Mark Peterson, the North American Soccer League's player of the year in 1982, began the season with the Seattle Sounders, but joined Team America during the 1983 season after receiving severe criticism from other U.S. players.

=== Demise ===
The team's initial attendance figures were decent enough: an average of 19,952 through the first seven home matches. (This was a little misleading, however: the figure includes the 50,108 who attended a game against Fort Lauderdale that featured a free Beach Boys concert; the other six matches averaged just 14,926.) As the losses piled up, though, the fans stopped coming to RFK: barely 55,000 showed up for the last eight home games combined, lowering Team America's average to just 13,002 for the entire 1983 season. This was actually third-best in the rapidly fading 12-team NASL, but it wasn't enough to avoid severe financial losses, especially when coupled with the USSF's inability to finalize several potential marketing deals. Panagoulis wondered aloud, "Where are we going? What the hell are we doing? Why do these people keep paying me?" At the end of the season, Robert Lifton pulled the plug on the franchise; afterwards, he, Commissioner Samuels and the USSF engaged in much public rancor and wrangling over who was most responsible for the club's failure.

The Team America fiasco may also have had a hand in the destruction of another NASL franchise, the Montreal Manic. In his book, Soccer in a Football World, North American soccer historian Dave Wangerin partially attributes the downfall of the Manic organization to the Molson ownership's declaration to attempt to build a Team Canada roster for the 1984 season. The new direction of the club meant many of the Manic's non-Canadian players would be let go; given Canada's poor track record at producing world class soccer talent, fans were put off by the prospect that the team's play would diminish. (The fact the franchise played in francophone Montreal, rife with separatist sentiment, didn't help.) Sure enough, the Manic managed only a 12–18 mark in 1983 and saw their attendance drop by more than half, attracting only 9,910 fans per contest. Team Canada in the NASL never became a reality, as the Manic (who had already lost a reported $7 million in their first two seasons) folded after the 1983 season.

== Year by year ==
Year	League	W	L	T	Pts	Reg. season	Playoffs
1983	NASL	10	20	—	79	4th, Southern Division	did not qualify

== Honors ==
U.S. Soccer Hall of Fame

- 2003: Arnie Mausser
- 2014: Bruce Savage

Indoor Soccer Hall of Fame

- 2014: Bruce Savage

== See also ==
- Pailan Arrows, a similar attempt by the All India Football Federation to involve the India U19 team in the I-League.
