= List of Seattle Sounders FC managers =

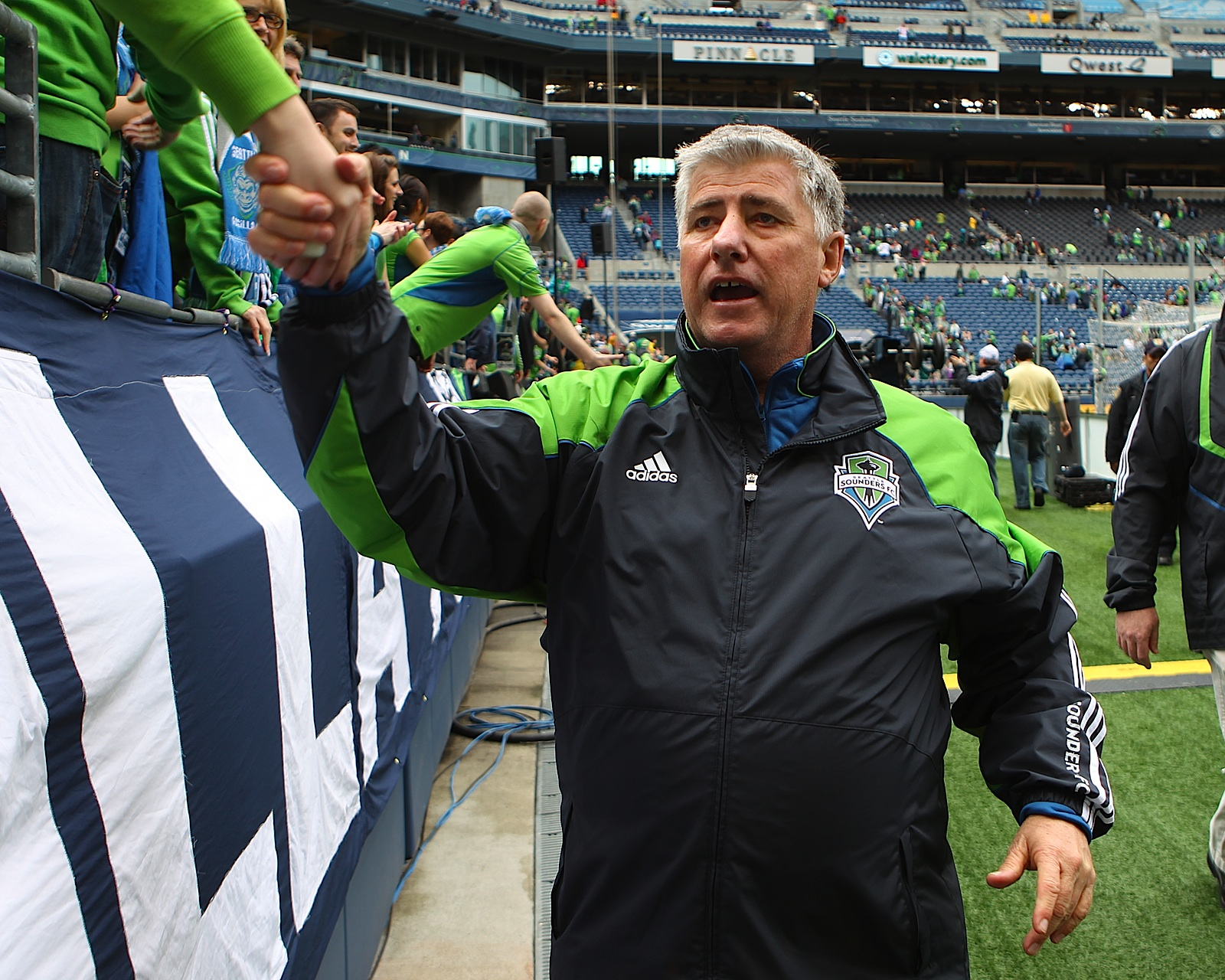
Sigi Schmid, the first manager of the Seattle Sounders FC

Seattle Sounders FC is a Major League Soccer (MLS) team that has played in the Western Conference since their debut in the 2009 season as an expansion franchise. The Sounders have had two manager since their inaugural MLS season: Sigi Schmid and Brian Schmetzer.

Schmid joined the team ahead of their inaugural season and coached for seven full seasons until his departure in July 2016; he led the Sounders to four U.S. Open Cup titles and a Supporters' Shield. He was replaced by Brian Schmetzer, who was named as caretaker manager after serving as assistant coach. Schmetzer had previously managed the club in the USL First Division and played for the NASL franchise in the 1980s. Schmetzer was named permanent head coach in November 2016, ahead of the team's first MLS Cup championship.

== Managers ==
As of December 31, 2025

This list includes all those who have managed the club since 2009, when the club joined Major League Soccer for the first time, whether managing on a full-time or caretaker basis. Games played include all regular season and MLS Cup Playoffs matches, and the win percentage is calculated from the total of games.

Key
†	Caretaker manager
‡	Caretaker manager before being appointed permanently

MP = Matches played; W = Matches won; L = Matches lost; D = Matches drawn; GF = Goals for; GA = Goals against. Only includes MLS records. See Major League Soccer records and statistics.

Name	Nationality	From	To	MP	W	L	D	GF	GA	Win%^{1}	Notes
Sigi Schmid	Germany	December 16, 2008	July 26, 2016	324	156	103	65	–	–	48.15%	Has the most regular season coaching wins in Major League Soccer history (228).
Brian Schmetzer†	United States	July 11, 2009		1	1	0	0	2	1	100.00%	Schmid unavailable due to family obligations, vs. Houston Dynamo
Brian Schmetzer†	United States	October 22, 2012		1	1	0	0	3	1	100.00%	Schmid unavailable due to suspension, vs. FC Dallas
Brian Schmetzer†	United States	March 14, 2015		1	0	1	0	2	3	0.00%	Schmid unavailable due to family obligations, vs. San Jose Earthquakes
Brian Schmetzer†	United States	September 5, 2015		2	1	1	0	3	2	50.00%	Schmid unavailable due to health issue, vs. Toronto FC and San Jose Earthquakes
Brian Schmetzer‡	United States	July 26, 2016	Incumbent	341	160	96	85	506	390	46.92%	Made permanent head coach on November 2, 2016.

- ^{1}Win% is rounded to two decimal places.

== Records ==
=== Honors ===
As of December 31, 2025

Name	Nat	Tenure	Trophies	Honors
Sigi Schmid	Germany	2009–2016	5	MLS Supporters' Shield (1): 2014; Lamar Hunt U.S. Open Cup (4): 2009, 2010, 2011, 2014
Brian Schmetzer	United States	2016–present	8	CONCACAF Champions League (1): 2022; MLS Cup (2): 2016, 2019; Western Conference Championship (4): 2016, 2017, 2019, 2020; Leagues Cup (1): 2025

=== Most games managed ===
As of December 31, 2025

Manager	Games
(Germany) Sigi Schmid	324
(United States) Brian Schmetzer	341

== Earlier managers ==
The table lists managers since Seattle Sounders's election to Major League Soccer during it time in the North American Soccer League. It also includes the American Professional Soccer League and the USL First Division which took place between 1994 and 2008:

- (United States) John Best (1974-1976)
- (Scotland) Jimmy Gabriel (1977–1979)
- (England) Alan Hinton (1980–1982 and 1994–1995)
- (England) Laurie Calloway (1983)
- (England) Neil Megson (1996–2000)
- (England) Bernie James (2001)
- (United States) Brian Schmetzer (2002–2008)

== Assistant managers ==
Since the 2009 season, several assistant managers have been with the club:

- (United States) Brian Schmetzer (2008–2016)
- (Saint Vincent and the Grenadines) Ezra Hendrickson (2009–2015)
- (United States) Ante Razov (2015–2016)
- (Mali) Djimi Traoré (2016–2021)
- (Mexico) Gonzalo Pineda (2017–2021), departed to become head coach of Atlanta United FC
- (United States) Preki (2018–present), former MLS Coach of the Year with Chivas USA in 2007
- (United States) Freddy Juarez (2021–present)
- (England) Andy Rose (2022–2025)
- (United States) Ricardo Clark (2026–present)

== Current staff ==
Position	Staff	Since
General Manager and Chief Soccer Officer	(United States) Craig Waibel	2022
Head Coach	(United States) Brian Schmetzer	2016
Assistant Coach	(United States) Preki	2018
Assistant Coach	(United States) Freddy Juarez	2021
Assistant Coach	(United States) Ricardo Clark	2026
Goalkeeper Coach	(United States) Tom Dutra	2008
Head of Fitness	(Australia) Adam Centofanti	
Director of Scouting	(United States) Sean Henderson	

Updated to match played May 2026
Source: SoundersFC.com

== See also ==
- Seattle Sounders (1974–1983)
- Seattle Sounders (1994–2008)
