= Stuart Lee =

English footballer

Personal information
- Date of birth: 11 February 1953 (age 73)
- Place of birth: Manchester, England
- Position: Forward

Senior career*
Years	Team	Apps	(Gls)
1971–1974	Bolton Wanderers	77	(20)
1975–1978	Wrexham	46	(12)
1978–1979	Stockport County	49	(21)
1979	Manchester City	6	(2)
1980–1982	Portland Timbers	73	(15)
1980–1982	Portland Timbers (indoor)	35	(42)
1982–1983	Kansas City Comets (indoor)	46	(24)
1983	Carolina Lightnin'	25	(11)
1983–1985	Los Angeles Lazers (indoor)	95	(75)
1984	Tampa Bay Rowdies	12	(0)
1985–1986	St. Louis Steamers (indoor)	13	(4)
1986	Kansas City Comets (indoor)	36	(15)
1986–1987	Los Angeles Lazers (indoor)	52	(31)
1987–1988	Dallas Sidekicks (indoor)	21	(2)

Managerial career
- 1990: Seattle Storm
- 1993–1995: Seattle Storm
- * Club domestic league appearances and goals

Stuart Lee (born 11 February 1953) is an English former football forward. Lee was born in Manchester, and played professionally in England, Wales and the United States.

== Player ==
In 1971, Lee began his professional career when he signed with Bolton Wanderers. He was seventeen at the time. He spent three season in the second and third Division of the Football League with Bolton before transferring to third division Wrexham. At the time, Wrexham experienced considerable success in both the FA Cup and European competitions. In 1976, they went to the quarterfinals of the Cup Winners Cup where Lee scored the team's lone goal in a 2–1 aggregate loss to R.S.C. Anderlecht. He spent two seasons with Wrexham before moving to Stockport County in 1978. He spent only one season with Stockport before moving to the first division with Manchester City. However, he played only six league games before being sold to the Portland Timbers of the North American Soccer League. He spent three seasons with the Timbers. During that time, he played three outdoor seasons and two indoor seasons. The Timbers folded at the end of the 1982 season and Lee signed with the Kansas City Comets of the Major Indoor Soccer League. In 1982, he returned to outdoor soccer with the Carolina Lightnin' of the second division American Soccer League. By this time, outdoor soccer was collapsing in the United States and the ASL ceased operations following the 1983 season. Lee signed with the Los Angeles Lazers of the MISL in the fall of 1983. He would play two seasons for the Lazers. He returned to the NASL for the 1984 season, playing for the Tampa Bay Rowdies, but the league collapsed at the end of the season. Lee would remain with the indoor game for the remainder of his career. On 6 September 1985, the St. Louis Steamers signed Lee. After one season, he moved to the Kansas City Comets then back to the Lazers. Lee signed as a free agent with the Dallas Sidekicks on 20 October 1987. He spent one season with the Sidekicks, then retired from playing professionally.

== Coach ==
Following his retirement as a player, Lee returned to England, where he became a manager in the Stockport County reserves. He would return to Portland during the summers to run youth soccer camps. On 29 November 1989, the Seattle Storm of the American Professional Soccer League hired Lee to replace Tommy Jenkins as head coach. The Storm folded at the end of the 1990 season. In December 1993, he bought the team from Bud Greer and entered it in the amateur Pacific Coast League. Lee is currently coaching at Crossfire in Seattle.
