= Jeff Stock =

American soccer player and coach

Personal information
- Date of birth: August 1, 1960 (age 66)
- Place of birth: Baltimore, Maryland, United States
- Height: 6 ft 1 in (1.85 m)
- Position: Defender

Senior career*
Years	Team	Apps	(Gls)
1979–1983	Seattle Sounders	98	(5)
1980–1982	Seattle Sounders (indoor)	35	(6)
1983–1984	Golden Bay Earthquakes (indoor)	4	(0)
1984	Vancouver Whitecaps	20	(0)
1985–1986	Tacoma Stars (indoor)	17	(1)
1987–1988	Seattle Storm		

Managerial career
- 1989–1990: Seattle Storm (assistant)
- * Club domestic league appearances and goals

Jeff Stock (born August 1, 1960, in Baltimore, Maryland) is a retired U.S. soccer defender who spent five seasons in the North American Soccer League and two in the Western Soccer Alliance. He also played in the Major Indoor Soccer League with the Tacoma Stars.

== Youth ==
Stock is the son of Major League Baseball pitcher Wes Stock and grew up playing baseball. His family moved back to the Puget Sound region after Wes Stock was hired as a pitching coach by the Seattle Mariners. Stock attended Stadium High School in Tacoma, Washington, where he played baseball, and graduated in 1978. He also played for the Norpoint Royals youth soccer club with future Sounders teammate Mark Peterson. Stock was offered a combined baseball and soccer scholarship by UCLA, but he decided to instead sign a professional soccer contract as soon as he turned 18. He also attended the University of Washington for one quarter but dropped out due to conflicts with his soccer schedule.

== Professional ==
Stock signed with the Seattle Sounders of the North American Soccer League in 1978. He spent both that season and the next on the reserve team under Jimmy Gabriel before breaking into the first team in 1980. That season, he became a regular left back in the Sounders' defensive scheme, seeing time in 23 games and scoring one goal. This put him in competition for Rookie of the Year against teammate Mark Peterson and fellow Tacoma area youth defender Jeff Durgan, now playing with the New York Cosmos all of whom played with the Norpoint Royals youth soccer team out of Browns Point, Wa. While Durgan won the award, Stock continued to excel with the Sounders, playing 35 games in both the 1981 and 1982 seasons. In 1983, Stock lost most of the season after blowing out his right knee in the Sounders' fifth game. The Sounders folded at the end of the season and the San Jose Earthquakes selected Stock in the dispersal draft in anticipation of the following indoor season. However, his knee injury kept out of the line up until the last few games of the season. The Earthquakes then traded him to the Vancouver Whitecaps. In 1984, he played in 20 games. That year the Whitecaps also competed in the F.C. Seattle Challenge ‘84. The host team, F.C. Seattle, later change its name to the F.C. Seattle Storm, a team Stock joined in 1987. On October 20, 1984, the Whitecaps released Stock.

He then went on trial with the Tacoma Stars of the Major Indoor Soccer League, but he aggravated his knee injury and was forced to sit out a year after having arthroscopic surgery. In October 1985, Stock signed with the Tacoma Stars. By this time knee injuries had begun to hinder Stock and the hard surface of an indoor soccer arena exacerbated the problems leading him to retire in December 1986. On March 4, 1987, Stock returned to outdoor soccer with the F.C. Seattle Storm of the Western Soccer Alliance as a player/assistant coach. The move back to the grass of an outdoor soccer field helped extend his career by a few years. In 1988, he was selected to the Western Soccer Alliance All-Star team. He also served as an assistant coach in both 1987 and 1988. However, his knees finally gave and in 1989 he retired from playing professionally to devote himself to coaching.

== National team ==
While never called up to the senior national team, Stock saw time with the United States under-19 team. He then went on to play for the U.S. Pan American Games team as well as for the U.S. soccer team which qualified for the 1980 Summer Olympics in Moscow. Stock and his teammates ultimately did not play in the Olympics due to a boycott organized by the United States in response to the Soviet invasion of Afghanistan.

== Post-soccer career ==
After retiring from soccer, Stock entered the real estate market as a broker and later landlord. He acquired two theme parks, Wild Waves and Enchanted Village, in Federal Way, Washington, with partner Michael Moodenbaugh in 1992 from Byron Betts for $8 million. Eight years later, he sold the two parks, now merged into one for $19.2 million. Stock took over management of the park in 2011 for the owners CNL Lifestyle Properties of Orlando, Stock has been a continuous owner of the land the park is located on.

Since then Stock has founded the "Coffee Cup" a local college soccer tournament. He also operates a coffee-roasting business, Caffe D'arte.

== Personal life ==
Stock has two sons with his wife Leanne. They live in Tacoma, Washington.
