= Matthew Olson =

American soccer player

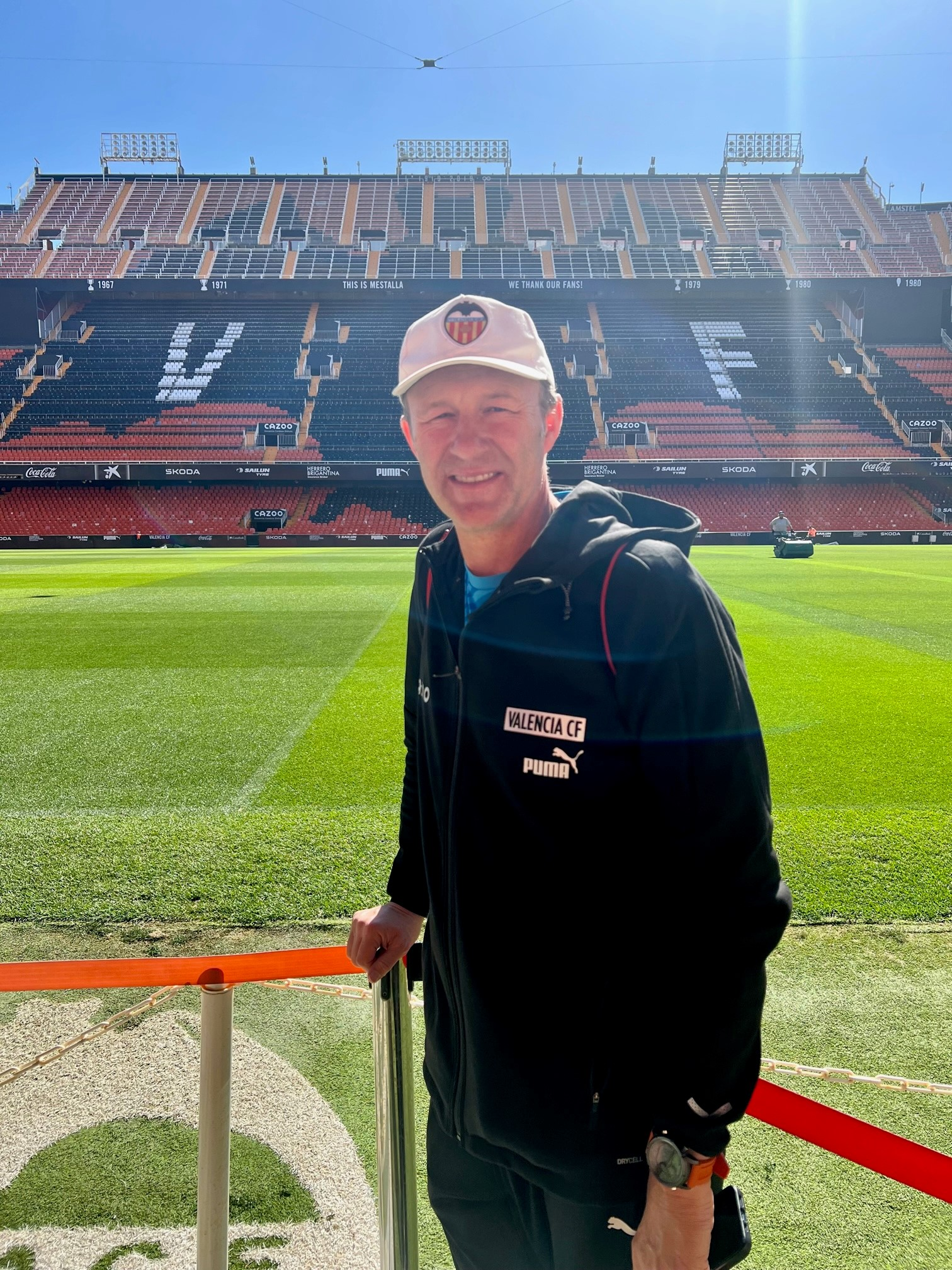
- Director of Coaching, 2023

Personal information
- Full name: Matthew Olson
- Place of birth: Renton, Washington, United States
- Height: 6 ft 2 in (1.88 m)
- Position: Goalkeeper

Youth career
- 1986, 1988: Indiana Hoosiers
- 1989–1990: Wake Forest Demon Deacons

Senior career*
Years	Team	Apps	(Gls)
1989	Seattle Storm		
1995	Everett BigFoot		
1996	Hampton Roads Mariners	DC United	
1997	Carolina Dynamo	2	(0)

Managerial career
- 1992–1996: Washington Huskies (Assistant)
- 1997: Wake Forest Demon Deacons (Assistant)
- 2004–: Washington Huskies (Assistant)
- 2007–: Pacific Lutheran University (Washington) (Assistant)
- * Club domestic league appearances and goals

Matthew Olson is an American retired soccer goalkeeper.

== Player ==
=== College ===
Olson graduated from Lindbergh Senior High School. In 1986, he began his collegiate career at Indiana University where he won the 1988 NCAA Division I Men's Soccer Championship. He then transferred to Wake Forest University where he played the 1989 (ACC Champions) and 1990 seasons (#4 Ranking, NCAA Tournament - 2nd round).

=== Professional ===
In 1989, Olson played for the Seattle Storm in the Western Soccer Alliance. In 1995, he played for the Everett BigFoot. In February 1996, D.C. United selected Olson in the thirteenth round (130th overall) of the 1996 MLS Inaugural Player Draft. On March 4, 1996, D.C. United then traded Olson to the MetroStars. On April 15, 1996, the MetroStars released Olson. Olson was picked up by the New England Revolution. He then signed with the Hampton Roads Mariners for the 1996 season where he was named to the USISL All-Star team. He later re-joined D.C. United and was a member of the 1996 MLS Cup Championship team. In early 1997, Olson suffered a broken leg but returned to the USISL later in the year to play two games for the Carolina Dynamo.

Olson also has experience playing in Europe having trials at Luton Town, Wolverhampton Wanderers, West Bromwich Albion and playing a few first team games at Cheltenham Town as well as spending time with clubs in Sweden Hammarby and AIK Stockholm and Holland Vitesse Arnhem and Ajax Amsterdam.

== Coaching ==
In 1992, Olson joined the Washington Huskies as a goalkeeper coach, a position he held until 1996. In 1997, he spent one season as the goalkeeper coach at his alma mater, Wake Forest. In 1998, he became the girls' soccer coach at Skyline High School where he was the 2000 King County Coach of the Year. Over his seven seasons with Skyline, Olson took the team to a 62-26-11 record and third and fourth-place finish in the 3A WIAA state championships. On February 23, 2004, he returned to the Washington Huskies as an assistant coach. He also served as the goalkeeper coach for Pacific Lutheran University (Washington) men's and women's team. He is currently a Director at Eagleclaw FC/Valencia CF Academy-Seattle and a Staff Instructor with the United Soccer Coaches (USC), holding a US Soccer 'A' License. Olson is also a Professional Match Director with Major League Soccer (MLS).
