= Mike Enneking =

American soccer player

Personal information
- Place of birth: Seattle, Washington, U.S.
- Height: 6 ft 2 in (1.88 m)
- Position: Forward

Youth career
- 1980–1983: Washington Huskies

Senior career*
Years	Team	Apps	(Gls)
1983–1985	Tacoma Stars (indoor)	56	(1)
1984	Fort Lauderdale Sun	0	(0)
1987	Seattle Storm		
1997	Seattle Sounders	8	(0)
- * Club domestic league appearances and goals

Mike Enneking is an American retired soccer player who played professionally in the Western Soccer Alliance and Major Indoor Soccer League. He is the Vice President of Crossfire Premier Soccer Club.

Enneking graduated from Bellarmine Preparatory School in 1980. He set the Washington State prep single season scoring record with 39 goals and was inducted into the school's Athletic Hall of Fame in 2001. He then attended the University of Washington where he played on the men's soccer team from 1980 to 1983. In the fall of 1983, he signed with the Tacoma Stars of the Major Indoor Soccer League. He spent two seasons with the Stars. In the spring of 1984, Enneking signed with the Fort Lauderdale Sun of the United Soccer League, but played no games before being released in June 1984. After being released by the Stars in 1985, Enneking became a car salesman and eventually opened his own dealership. In 1987, he joined the F.C. Seattle Storm of the Western Soccer Alliance. He was the Alliance's the third leading scorer that season. In 1997, he played for the Seattle Sounders of the USISL A-League.
