= Seattle Storm (soccer) =

American soccer team

- Full name: Football Club Seattle Storm
- Nickname: The Storm
- Founded: 1984
- Dissolved: 1995; 31 years ago
- Stadium: Memorial Stadium
- Capacity: 12,000
- Chairman: Bud Greer
- League: Western Soccer League
Home colours

Football Club Seattle Storm, also known as the F.C. Seattle Storm, was an American soccer team based in Seattle, Washington. F.C. Seattle was a "super club" created to provide Seattle players an opportunity to play at a higher level than the local recreational and semi-pro leagues. In addition to playing exhibition matches against top international teams, F.C. Seattle was a member of the short lived Western Soccer Alliance, was a founding member of the American Professional Soccer League and later spent three seasons in the Pacific Coast Soccer League.

== History ==
=== 1984: F.C. Seattle Challenge ===
In 1984, F.C. Seattle hosted the F.C. Seattle Challenge '84. This series pitted F.C. Seattle against three NASL teams, the Vancouver Whitecaps (2–2 tie), Minnesota Strikers (0–3 loss), New York Cosmos (1–2 loss), as well as the 1984 U.S. Olympic Team. For this challenge cup, the team filled its roster from local colleges, high schools and semi-pro teams. However, five F.C. Seattle players had previous professional experience: Jack Brand, Jerry Cameron, Eddie Krueger, Joe James and Robbie Zipp. The team was coached by former Sounders player Tom Jenkins and played its games in Seattle's Memorial Stadium. The series averaged just over six thousand fans per game. At the end of it, NASL officials approached F.C. Seattle about entering the NASL for the 1985 season. F.C. Seattle declined, noting that most NASL teams hemorrhaged money. The club's backers, including owner Bud Greer, preferred to keep it on a semi-professional basis and develop players while building a fanbase for a future professional team.

=== 1985: Western Alliance Challenge Series ===
In 1985, F.C. Seattle joined with three other independent "super clubs", F.C. Portland, San Jose Earthquakes and Victoria Riptides, to create the Western Alliance Challenge Series. This series came in response to the cancellation of games F.C. Seattle had scheduled against English teams West Bromwich Albion and Aston Villa. In June, FIFA had banned English clubs from travelling for international games after Liverpool fans sparked massive deaths in fan violence in Belgium.

F.C. Portland hosted F.C. Seattle for the first game of the series, a game F.C. Seattle won on the strength of a Bruce Raney hat trick. Other significant F.C. Seattle players included Jeff Durgan, the Schmetzer brothers - Andy, Brian and Walter, and Peter Hattrup. However, Bruce Rioch, who had replaced Jack Brand as head coach in February, released Durgan from the team after he was ejected for making several flagrant fouls in the game against the Canada national team in July.

=== 1986–1989: Western Soccer Alliance/League ===
In 1986, three of the four teams from 1985, decided to form the Western Soccer Alliance. Only Victoria declined to join the new alliance, but they were replaced by the Edmonton Brick Men.

In 1987, the WSA instituted a two-game post-season playoff series. F.C. Seattle, which finished second in alliance standings, lost 3–0 to the San Jose Earthquakes in the wild card game.

Up to now F.C. Seattle had also been known as the F.C. Seattle Storm. In 1988, the team officially dropped the F.C. and became the Seattle Storm. However, they were still referred to as the F.C. Seattle Storm throughout the season and the new name was not widely used until the 1989 season. The 1988 season was one of the most successful for the Storm when it cruised to the top of the regular season standings, then crushed the Earthquakes 5–0 in the championship game.

In 1989, the Storm failed to build on its previous year's success and finished out of playoff contention. As a side note, the WSA changed its name to the Western Soccer League.

=== 1990: American Professional Soccer League ===
In 1990, the Storm, along with the rest of the WSL merged with the American Soccer League to form the American Professional Soccer League. They would play in the North Division of the WSL Conference, which comprised all teams from the former WSL. Despite Chance Fry leading the league with 17 goals and 5 assists, the Storm finished last in the North Division of the West Conference. Following the season, Greer announced his intention to have the Storm sit out the 1991 season. However, in February 1992, he decided to fold the team.

=== 1993–1995: Pacific Coast Soccer League ===
In December 1992, Stuart Lee bought the rights to the team and entered it in the amateur Pacific Coast Soccer League. The team competed through the 1995 season then withdrew from senior competitions. It continues to operate as a local soccer club with boys and girls teams in all age competitions.

== Yearly record ==
Year	Team Name	League	Reg. season	Playoffs	Open Cup
1985	F.C. Seattle	WSA	3rd	No playoffs	Did not enter
1986	F.C. Seattle	WSA	3rd	No playoffs	Did not enter
1987	F.C. Seattle Storm	WSA	2nd	Wild Card	Did not enter
1988	Seattle Storm	WSA	1st	Champion	Did not enter
1989	Seattle Storm	WSL	3rd, North	Did not qualify	Did not enter
1990	Seattle Storm	APSL	5th, WSL North	Did not qualify	Did not enter
1993	F.C. Seattle Storm	PCSL			Did not enter
1994	F.C. Seattle Storm	PCSL			Did not enter
1995	F.C. Seattle Storm	PCSL	8th	Did not qualify	Did not enter

== Ownership and staff ==
- (United States) Bud Greer - Chairman
- (United States) William C. Sage - President / General Manager

== Coaches ==
Record includes both league and exhibition matches.

Name	Nat	From	To	Record					
Name	Nat	From	To	P	W	D	L	F	A
Tommy Jenkins	(England)	1984	February 1985	7	1	1	5	6	12
Bruce Rioch	(Scotland)	February 1985	September 1985	13	6	1	6	23	25
Jimmy Gabriel	(Scotland)	September 1985	1988	35	14	4	17	49	53
Tommy Jenkins	(England)	1988	1989	39	25	2	12	76	49
Stuart Lee	(England)	1990	1990	26	13	0	13	53	45
Stuart Lee	(England)	1993	1995						

== Notable players ==
This list includes those former players who received international caps while playing for the team, made significant contributions to the team in terms of appearances or goals, or who made significant contributions to the sport either before they played for the team, or after they left.

- (United States) Scott Benedetti
- (United States) Rick Davis
- (United States) Jeff Durgan
- (United States) Chance Fry
- (United States) Brent Goulet
- (United States) Peter Hattrup
- (United States) Chris Henderson
- (United States) Eddie Henderson
- (United States) Bernie James
- (United States) Billy Crook
- (United States) Rick Blubaugh
- (United States) Brian Schmetzer
- (United States) Jeff Stock
- (United States) Wade Webber

== Exhibition games ==
As an independent soccer team, F.C. Seattle original purpose was to play exhibition games. Even after the establishment of the Western Soccer Alliance, exhibition games remained one of the most significant elements of the team's seasons.

=== 1984 ===
Date	Opponent	Venue	Result	Attendance	Scorers
June 10, 1984	Vancouver Whitecaps	Memorial Stadium	2–2	5,984	Raney (0:45), Backous (84:24)
June 21, 1984	Minnesota Strikers	Memorial Stadium	0–3	4,863	—
July 6, 1984	New York Cosmos	Memorial Stadium	1–2	7,631	Krueger (1:50)
July 13, 1984	1984 U.S. Olympic Team	Memorial Stadium	1–3	8,199	Hiatt (5:42)
August 4, 1984	at Vancouver Whitecaps	BC Place	1–2	1,426	Willoughby (7:46), Raney (80:26)
September 8, 1984	Vancouver Fire	Memorial Stadium	0–1		—

=== 1985 results ===
June 2: Dundee F.C. 0–1
June 9: Santos 2–1
June 16: Guadalajara 2–3
June 23: US National Team 2–3

=== 1986 ===
April 24: Canada national team 2–3
May 27: Manchester City 0–1
June 6: Dundee F.C. 1–2
July 19: SC Cleveland 2–1

=== 1987 ===
May 31: Hearts 1–1
June 5: Norwich City 2–0
June 20: Neza, Mexico City
July 10: Herfølge 2–1
July 15: Vancouver Whitecaps 0–1
Stormin the Isles Tour of Britain:

July 27: Middlesbrough 1–2
July 29: AFC Bournemouth 0–1
July 31: Queens Park Rangers F.C. 2–2
August 4: Dundee 0–3
August 6: Portsmouth 1–3

=== 1988 ===
May 7: Calgary Strikers 3–1
June 11: Middlesbrough 2–1
June 26: Atlante
August 3: Oldham Athletic 0–2
August 6: Lincoln City F.C. 2–2
August 10: Middlesbrough 0–3
August 13: Sunderland F.C. 0–3
August 16: Hull City A.F.C 2–2

=== 1989 ===
May 7: Vancouver 86ers 2–1
August 3: Victoria Vistas 3–0

=== 1990 ===
May 5: Victoria Vistas 3–0
May 20: AFC Bournemouth 1–0
May 29: Dnepr 1–2
August 1: at Victoria Vistas 1–0
August 5: at Vancouver 86ers 5–3
August 8: Vancouver 86ers 3–2

== All time roster (1984–1990) ==
=== Goalkeepers ===
- Jack Brand: 1984
- Sergio Soriano: 1984
- Mark Schuur: 1985-1986, 1988
- Bill Glandon: 1986
- Jeff Koch: 1986-1989
- Jeff Storrs: 1987-1990
- Mark Berry: 1987
- Rolf Norton: 1988-1989
- Jim Neighbors: 1988
- Matthew Olson: 1989
- Chris Bell: 1990
- Jim Brazeau: 1990

=== Defenders ===
- Doug Backous: 1984
- Pat Blann: 1984
- Dave Felt: 1984
- Eddie Krueger: 1984
- Terry McGill: 1984
- Steve Englebrick: 1984-1985
- Robbie Zipp: 1984-1985
- Rick Blubaugh: 1984, 1986-1989
- Joe James: 1984, 1989
- Jeff Durgan: 1985
- Don Farler: 1985-1990
- Peter Fewing: 1985-1990
- Dan Pingrey: 1985
- Tom Blahous: 1986-1987
- Daryl Green: 1986-1989
- James Hodgson: 1986
- Kevin Iverson: 1986
- Dave Wittrell: 1986
- Randy Hanson: 1987
- Kevin O’Keefe: 1987
- Jeff Stock: 1987-1989
- Billy Crook: 1988
- Grant Gibbs: 1988-1990
- Rob Goff: 1988, 1989
- Bernie James: 1988-1989
- Ray Evans: 1989
- Steve McCrath: 1988-1990
- Bob McLaughlin: 1989
- Ian MacLean: 1989
- Craig Ottosen: 1989
- Wade Webber: 1990
- Garrett Smith: 1990

=== Midfielders ===
- Jerry Cameron: 1984
- Teddy Mitalas: 1984
- Tad Willoughby: 1984, 1986-1989
- Ken Fuegmann: 1985-1988
- Dennis Gunnell: 1985-1988
- Andy Schmetzer: 1985
- Brian Schmetzer: 1985
- Rob Fossett: 1985-1986
- Peter Hattrup: 1986, 1988-1989
- Geoff Wall: 1986, 1987, 1988
- Ken Coplin: 1987, 1989
- John Hamel: 1987-1990
- Fran O’Brien: 1988-1990
- Ralph Black: 1989
- Rick Davis: 1989
- Chris Henderson: 1989
- Jimmy McAlister: 1989
- Jim Weber: 1990
- Robb Sakamoto: 1990
- James Forgette: 1990

=== Forwards ===
- Eric Knapp: 1984
- Sasha Shefts: 1984
- Gerard McGlynn: 1984-1985
- Tom Blahous: 1984-1985
- Mike Hiatt: 1984-1985
- Bruce Raney: 1984-1986
- Sean Connors: 1985
- Walt Schmetzer: 1985
- Eric Guise: 1986-1987
- Gary Hunter: 1986
- Sean McGlynn: 1986, 1987
- Sean Connors: 1987
- Mike Enneking: 1987
- Chance Fry: 1987-1990
- Mark Peterson: 1987
- Eddie Henderson: 1988-1990
- Clint Carnell: 1989
- Brent Goulet: 1989
- Gary Heale: 1989
- John Klein: 1989
- Scott Benedetti: 1990
- Jason Russ: 1990
- Chris Saari: 1990
