= Gerard McGlynn =

American soccer player

Personal information
- Date of birth: October 16, 1962 (age 64)
- Height: 6 ft 1 in (1.85 m)
- Positions: Forward; midfielder

Youth career
- 1981–1984: Seattle Pacific University

Senior career*
Years	Team	Apps	(Gls)
1984–1987	F.C. Seattle		
1985–1986	Tacoma Stars (indoor)	5	(1)
1986–1987	Louisville Thunder (indoor)		
- * Club domestic league appearances and goals

Gerard McGlynn is an American retired soccer midfielder who played professionally in the Western Soccer Alliance and Major Indoor Soccer League. He is currently the Vice President of Crossfire Premier Soccer Club.

McGlynn graduated from O'Dea High School in 1981. He then attended Seattle Pacific University where he played on the men's soccer team from 1981 to 1984. He was a member of the SPU team which won the 1983 NCAA Men's Division II Soccer Championship and finished runner-up in 1984. In 1984, he began playing for F.C. Seattle and would play each summer outdoor season with the team until 1987. He played for the Tacoma Stars of the Major Indoor Soccer League from 1985 to 1986 and the Louisville Thunder of the American Indoor Soccer Association from 1986 to 1987.
