= Jerry Cameron =

American soccer player (born 1962)

Personal information
- Date of birth: December 14, 1962 (age 63)
- Place of birth: Seattle, Washington, U.S.
- Positions: Midfielder; defender

Senior career*
Years	Team	Apps	(Gls)
1981–1982	Phoenix Inferno (indoor)	3	(0)
1984	F.C. Seattle		
- * Club domestic league appearances and goals

Jerry Cameron is an American retired soccer midfielder who played professionally in the Major Indoor Soccer League.

Cameron, a graduate of Ballard High School played three games for the Phoenix Inferno of the Major Indoor Soccer League during the 1981–1982 season. In 1984, Cameron played for F.C. Seattle in the F.C. Seattle Challenge Series.
