= Eddie Krueger =

American soccer player

Personal information
- Date of birth: September 10, 1959 (age 67)
- Place of birth: Buffalo, New York, U.S.
- Positions: Defender; midfielder

Senior career*
Years	Team	Apps	(Gls)
1977–1980	Seattle Sounders	12	(0)
1980	San Diego Sockers	1	(0)
1984	F.C. Seattle		
1984	Vancouver Whitecaps	2	(0)
1984–	Mitre Eagles		
- * Club domestic league appearances and goals

Eddie Krueger is an American retired soccer defender who played professionally in the North American Soccer League.

In 1977, Krueger graduated from Seattle Preparatory School and signed as a seventeen-year-old with the Seattle Sounders of the North American Soccer League. He spent the first year on the reserve team, but broke into the first team in 1978. In 1980, the Sounders traded him to the San Diego Sockers

In 1984 Krueger played for F.C. Seattle during the 1984 F.C. Seattle Challenge Series. This brought him to the attention of the Vancouver Whitecaps who were one of the three other teams in the challenge series. Krueger signed with Vancouver and played two games. After retiring from professional soccer at the end of the season, Krueger returned to Seattle where he joined the Mitre Eagles, going to the finals of the 1987 National Challenge Cup with them. He also worked as an electrical engineer.
