= Chris Saari =

American soccer player

Personal information
- Date of birth: March 1, 1967 (age 59)
- Place of birth: Seattle, Washington, U.S.
- Height: 5 ft 10 in (1.78 m)
- Position: Midfielder

Youth career
- 1986–1989: The Evergreen State College

Senior career*
Years	Team	Apps	(Gls)
1990	Seattle Storm		
1990–1991	Tacoma Stars (indoor)	1	(1)
- * Club domestic league appearances and goals

Chris Saari is an American retired soccer midfielder who played professionally in the American Professional Soccer League and Major Indoor Soccer League.

Saari graduated from Nathan Hale High School. He then played soccer at The Evergreen State College from 1986 to 1989. In 1990, he played for the Seattle Storm of the American Professional Soccer League. In the fall of 1990, he signed with the Tacoma Stars of the Major Indoor Soccer League. He played one game, scoring one goal, for the Stars in January 1991.

In 2004, Saari became the Port Angeles High School boys' soccer coach.
