= Andy Schmetzer =

American soccer player (born 1967)

Personal information
- Full name: Andy M. Schmetzer
- Date of birth: April 26, 1967 (age 59)
- Place of birth: Seattle, Washington, United States
- Height: 5 ft 10 in (1.78 m)
- Position: Midfielder

Youth career
- Sporthaus FC
- Nathan Hale High School.

Senior career*
Years	Team	Apps	(Gls)
1985	F.C. Seattle	?	(2)
1985–1988	Cleveland Force (indoor)	60	(21)
1988–1990	Tacoma Stars (indoor)	96	(39)
1990–2001	Cleveland Crunch (indoor)	367	(225)
1997	Charleston Battery	23	(3)

International career
- U.S. Futsal

Managerial career
- 2001: Cleveland Force (assistant)
- 2002–2004: Cleveland Force
- * Club domestic league appearances and goals

Andy M. Schmetzer (born April 26, 1967) is a former U.S. soccer midfielder and indoor soccer coach.

== Club career ==
=== Youth ===
Schmetzer grew up in Seattle, Washington, where he attended Nathan Hale High School. He learned to play soccer under the tutelage of his father Walter who coached him with the Lake City Hawks youth team. Walter, a native of Germany, had played in the German Third Division before immigrating to the United States. Schmetzer, and his twin brother Walt led Nathan Hale to the 1985 3A Washington State boys soccer championship. Andy was also a member of the Sporthaus FC youth team which won the Washington State championship.

=== Professional ===
After graduating in 1985, both Schmetzers, along with their older brother Brian signed with F.C. Seattle of the Western Soccer Alliance. In 1985, the Cleveland Force of Major Indoor Soccer League (MISL) selected Schmetzer in the first round of the MISL draft. He played three seasons with the Force before moving to the Tacoma Stars after the Force folded in 1988. However, in 1989, Cleveland received an expansion MISL franchise, the Cleveland Crunch. Schmetzer moved back to Cleveland in 1990. In 1992, MISL folded and the Crunch moved to the National Professional Soccer League. Schmetzer and his teammates went on to win three NPSL titles in 1994, 1996 and 1999. He retired from playing professionally in 2001 having spent five seasons as the Crunch's team captain. In 1997, Schmetzer spent a single season with the Charleston Battery.

== International career ==
In 1992, Schmetzer played with the United States national futsal team that placed second in the FIFA Futsal World Championship held in Hong Kong.

== Coaching career ==
Following his retirement from playing in 2001, Schmetzer returned as an assistant coach with the Force. In 2002, he became the team's head coach until he retired in 2004. Schmetzer continues to coach at the youth level. In 2000, he co-founded the Cleveland Soccer Academy and spent five years coaching the Girls Premier team. He was also a Super Y-League Boys coach in 2003–2004. He also coaches Crossfire Premier team in Redmond, Washington. He coached his girls team to a National title in 2009. That team also won all their summer tournaments placing 2nd in state falling to the other team in penalty kicks.
