= Washington Huskies men's soccer =

American college soccer team

- 2026 Washington Huskies men's soccer team
- Founded: 1962; 64 years ago
- University: University of Washington
- Athletic director: Patrick Chun
- Head coach: Jamie Clark (16th season)
- Conference: Big Ten
- Location: Seattle, Washington, US
- Stadium: Husky Soccer Stadium (capacity: 2,200)
- Nickname: Huskies
- Colors: Purple and white
Home	Away

NCAA tournament championships
- 2025

NCAA tournament runner-up
- 2021

NCAA tournament College Cup
- 2021, 2025

NCAA tournament Quarterfinals
- 2013, 2019, 2020, 2021, 2025

NCAA tournament Round of 16
- 1992, 1996, 1997, 1999, 2000, 2003, 2013, 2014, 2016, 2019, 2020, 2021, 2025

NCAA tournament Round of 32
- 1972, 1992, 1996, 1997, 1999, 2000, 2001, 2003, 2006, 2007, 2012, 2013, 2014, 2016, 2019, 2020, 2021, 2022, 2024, 2025

NCAA tournament appearances
- 1968, 1972, 1973, 1976, 1978, 1982, 1989, 1992, 1995, 1996, 1997, 1998, 1999, 2000, 2001, 2003, 2004, 2006, 2007, 2012, 2013, 2014, 2016, 2017, 2018, 2019, 2020, 2021, 2022, 2024, 2025

Conference regular season championships
- 1968, 1972, 1973, 1976, 1982, 1983, 1985, 1987, 1992, 1998, 1999, 2000, 2013, 2019

The Washington Huskies men's soccer team is an intercollegiate varsity sports team of the University of Washington. The team is a member of the Big Ten Conference of the National Collegiate Athletic Association (NCAA).

The team was formed in 1962, winning in their NCAA debut v the University of Victoria, 2–0. Washington finished the season with a 2–1 record.

Washington won their first NCAA national title in 2025 after defeating NC State 3–2 with a golden goal by Harrison Bertos.

== Conference affiliations ==
Conference	Period	Seasons	Record	Pct.
Western Washington Soccer Conference	1968–70	3	13–6–5	.646
Northwest Collegiate Soccer Conference	1971–91	21	138–28–13	.807
Mountain Pacific Sports Federation	1992–99	8	40–6–6	.827
Pac-12 Conference (Note: Records before the 2020 season started.)	2000–24	19	109–70–24	.596
Big 10 Conference	2024–present	2	n/a	n/a

== Players ==
=== Current roster ===
As of 19 Oct 2026

Note: Flags indicate national team as defined under FIFA eligibility rules; some limited exceptions apply. Players may hold more than one non-FIFA nationality.

No.	Pos.	Nation	Player
00	GK	USA	Kenny Pierpoint
0	GK	USA	Noah Newman
1	GK	USA	Stockton Short
2	DF	USA	Harper Mikolasy
3	DF	USA	Harrison Bertos
4	DF	USA	Egor Akulov
5	DF	USA	Asher Hestad
6	MF	USA	Zach Ramsey
7	MF	USA	Alex Hall
8	MF/FW	USA	Clarens Dollin
9	FW	USA	Emmett Layman
10	FW	USA	Callum Lugton
11	FW	USA	Nick O'Brien
12	DF	USA	Carter Gay
13	MF	USA	Kevin Hernandez

No.	Pos.	Nation	Player
15	DF	USA	Nate Chandler
16	DF	USA	Zack Meier
17	MF	USA	Cameron Cruz
18	FW	USA	Ibrahim Rashad
19	FW	USA	Jack Goetting
20	MF	USA	Jordy Dierks
21	MF	USA	Osato Enabulele
22	DF	USA	Shaun Brun
26	MF	USA	Connor Lofy
27	FW	USA	Anthony Garcia
29	DF	USA	Eashan Patel
30	GK	USA	Jaeger Felton
32	MF	USA	Wyatt Lewis
33	MF	USA	Chad Sovde
44	DF	USA	Gabe Fernandez

=== Records ===
Top scorers

#	Nat.	Player	Tenure	Goals
1	(United States)	Craig Beeson	1984–87	53
2	(United States)	Dan Vaughn	1974–77	52
3	(United States)	Mike Enneking	1980–83	44
4	(United States)	Erik Penner	1991–94	38
5	(United States)	John Klein	1981–84	37

Most assistances

#	Nat.	Player	Tenure	Assist.
1	(United States)	Jason Boyce	1994–97	34
2	(United States)	John Klein	1981–84	29
3	(United States)	Mike Enneking	1980–83	28
4	(United States)	Mike Park	1980–83	25
5	(United States)	Tad Willoughby	1979–82	24

Most saves

#	Nat.	Player	Tenure	Saves
1	(United States)	Craig Christopherson	1983–86	267
22	(United States)	Spencer Richey	2010–14	248
3	(United States)	Bill May	1994–97	233
4	(United States)	Dusty Hudock	1991–93	214
5	(United States)	Chris Eylander	2002–05	187

=== Players in the pros ===
In brackets, the year they started their pro career:

- (United States) Ely Allen (2008)
- (United States) Tom Bialek (1992)
- (United States) Blake Bodily (2020)
- (United States) Rick Blubaugh (1988)
- (United States) Jason Boyce (1988)
- (United States) Mike Chabala (2006)
- (United States) Raphael Cox (2009)
- (United States) Mike Enneking (1984)
- (United States) Chris Eylander (2006)
- (United States) Jason Farrell (1994)
- (United States) Pete Fewing
- (United States) Justin Fiddes
- (United States) Joe Franchino
- (United States) Daryl Green
- (United States) John Hamel
- (United States) Ty Harden
- (United States) Wes Hart
- (United States) Aaron Heinzen
- (Wales) Josh Heard
- (United States) Eddie Henderson
- (United States) Dusty Hudock
- (United States) George John
- (United States) Zach Kingsley
- (United States) C. J. Klaas
- (United States) Jeff Koch (1989)
- (United States) Bill May (1998)
- (United States) Chad McCarty
- (United States) Ellis McLoughlin
- (United States) James Moberg
- (United States) Taylor Peay
- (United States) Brandon Prideaux
- (United States) Brent Richards
- (United States) Spencer Richey
- (United States) Bryn Ritchie
- (Scotland) Mason Robertson
- (United States) Cristian Roldan (2015)
- (United States) Ian Russell (1998)
- (United States) Justin Schmidt (2017)
- (United States) Billy Sleeth (2000)
- (United States) Dylan Teves (2017)
- (United States) Andy Thoma (2015)
- (United States) Jaret Townsend (2017)
- (United States) Matt Van Houten (2000)
- (United States) Craig Waibel (1999)
- (United States) Danny Waltman (2003)

== Coaches ==
=== Current staff ===
As of 15 Sep 2024

Name	Position
Jamie Clark	Head coach
Richard Reece	Assistant coach
Mark Collings	Assistant coach
Ryan Fahey	Assistant coach

=== All-time head coaches ===
#	Nat	Name	Tenure
1	USA	Ron Jepson	1963–1964
2	USA	Derek Mallinson	1965
3	IRE	Mike Ryan	1966–1976
4	USA	Mike O'Malley	1977–1979
5	USA	Frank Gallo	1980–1982
6	USA	Denny Buck	1983–1984
7	USA	Ron Carter	1984–1991
8	USA	Dean Wurzberger	1992–2010
9	SCO	Jamie Clark	2011–present

== Titles ==
=== National ===
Championship	Title #	Year	Score (final)	Rival
NCAA tournament	1	2025	3–2 (a.e.t.)	NC State

=== Conference ===
Conference	Championship	Titles	Winning years	Ref.
Western Washington SC	Regular season	1	1968	
Northwest Collegiate SC	Regular season	7	1972, 1973, 1976, 1982, 1983, 1985, 1987	
Mountain Pacific SF	Regular season	3	1992, 1998, 1999	
Pac-12	Regular season	3	2000, 2013, 2019	

== Yearly records ==
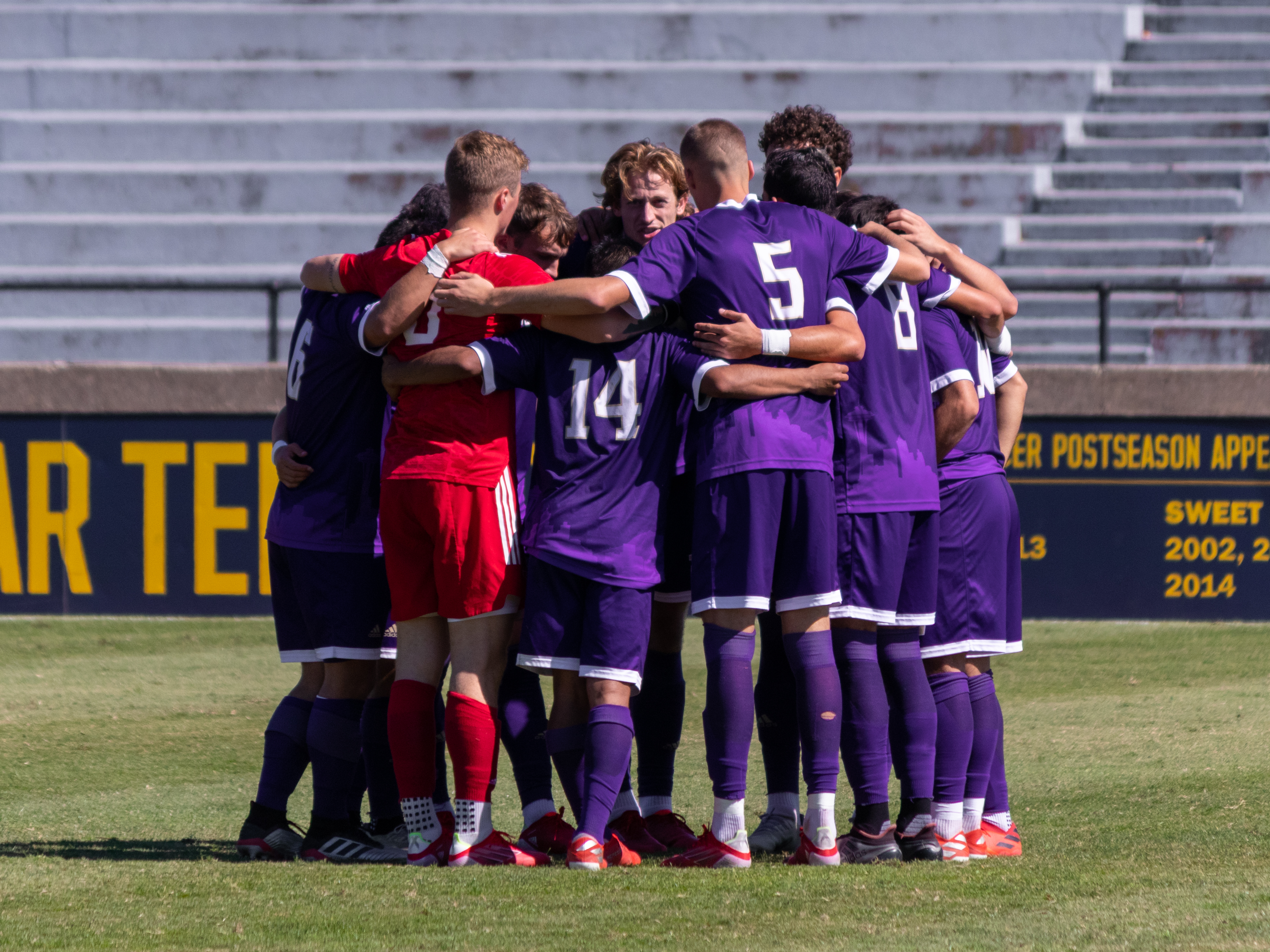
Huskies' men's soccer in a huddle during the 2021 season

Season	Coach	Overall	Conference	Standing	Postseason
Ron Jepson (Independent) (1962–1964)
1962	Ron Jepson	2–1–0	—		
1963	Ron Jepson	3–2–2	—		
1964	Ron Jepson	5–1–1	—		
Ron Jepson:		10–4–3			
Derek Mallinson (Independent) (1965)
1965	Derek Mallinson	1–5–0	—		
Derek Mallinson:		1–5–0			
Mike Ryan (Independent) (1966–1967)
1966	Mike Ryan	2–2–1	—		
1967	Mike Ryan	8–2–2	—		
Mike Ryan (Western Washington Soccer Conference) (1968–1970)
1968	Mike Ryan	5–6–3	3–1–2	1st	NCAA First Round
1969	Mike Ryan	5–2–1	5–2–1	2nd	
1970	Mike Ryan	5–3–2	5–3–2	3rd	
Mike Ryan (Northwest Collegiate Soccer Conference) (1968–1976)
1971	Mike Ryan	7–5–1	6–5–1	4th	
1972	Mike Ryan	12–4–2	11–0–1	1st	NCAA Second Round
1973	Mike Ryan	15–4–4	11–1–1	1st	NCAA First Round
1974	Mike Ryan	15–3–3	6–1–2	2nd	
1975	Mike Ryan	16–5–2	7–1–0	2nd	
1976	Mike Ryan	15–2–3	7–0–1	1st	NCAA First Round
Mike Ryan:		105–38–24	WWSC: 13–6–5; NCSC: 48–8–6		
Mike O'Malley (Northwest Collegiate Soccer Conference) (1977–1979)
1977	Mike O'Malley	14–2–1	7–1–0	2nd	
1978	Mike O'Malley	13–7–2	5–2–2	4th	NCAA First Round
1979	Mike O'Malley	11–7–2	5–2–1	4th	
Mike O'Malley:		38–16–5	17–5–3		
Frank Gallo (Northwest Collegiate Soccer Conference) (1980–1982)
1980	Frank Gallo	17–4–0	7–1–0	2nd	
1981	Frank Gallo	17–3–1	6–2–0	T–2nd	
1982	Frank Gallo	18–2–1	6–0–1	1st	NCAA First Round
Frank Gallo:		52–9–2	19–3–1		
Denny Buck (Northwest Collegiate Soccer Conference) (1983–1984)
1983	Denny Buck	17–3–1	8–0–0	1st	
1984	Denny Buck	14–3–2	6–2–0	3rd	
Denny Buck:		31–6–3	14–2–0		
Ron Carter (Northwest Collegiate Soccer Conference) (1985–1991)
1985	Ron Carter	11–6–0	8–1–0	1st	
1986	Ron Carter	9–5–6	7–2–1	T–2nd	
1987	Ron Carter	13–5–1	10–0–1	1st	
1988	Ron Carter	14–4–1	4–1–0	2nd	
1989	Ron Carter	15–6–1	4–2–0	3rd	NCAA First Round
1990	Ron Carter	11–4–5	3–2–1	2nd	
1991	Ron Carter	8–8–1	4–2–0	T–2nd	
Ron Carter:		81–38–15	40–10–3		
Dean Wurzberger (Mountain Pacific Sports Federation) (1992–1999)
1992	Dean Wurzberger	15–3–3	6–1–0	1st (Mountain)	NCAA 2nd Round
1993	Dean Wurzberger	9–5–4	3–1–3	5th (Mountain)	
1994	Dean Wurzberger	10–7–2	5–1–1	2nd (Mountain)	
1995	Dean Wurzberger	12–5–4	5–0–2	2nd (Mountain)	NCAA First Round
1996	Dean Wurzberger	15–3–1	3–1–0	2nd (Mountain)	
1997	Dean Wurzberger	16–3–2	4–2–0	2nd (Mountain)	NCAA 2nd Round
1998	Dean Wurzberger	8–8–2	3–5–2	1st	NCAA 1st Round
1999	Dean Wurzberger	15–5–2	7–0–0	1st	NCAA 2nd Round
Dean Wurzberger (Pac-10 Conference) (2000–2010)
2000	Dean Wurzberger	14–6–0	7–1–0	1st	NCAA 2nd Round
2001	Dean Wurzberger	13–6–0	4–4–0	3rd	NCAA 2nd Round
2002	Dean Wurzberger	6–10–3	4–5–0	5th	
2003	Dean Wurzberger	13–5–2	5–4–1	3rd	NCAA regional semifinal
2004	Dean Wurzberger	11–7–2	4–3–1	2nd	NCAA 1st Round
2005	Dean Wurzberger	10–7–2	3–5–2	5th	
2006	Dean Wurzberger	13–7–1	4–5–1	5th	NCAA second round
2007	Dean Wurzberger	9–8–4	3–4–3	5th	NCAA second round
2008	Dean Wurzberger	8–8–2	3–5–2	4th	
2009	Dean Wurzberger	5–7–6	2–3–5	5th	
2010	Dean Wurzberger	10–4–1	4–3–0	3rd	
Dean Wurzberger:		197–103–41	MPSF: 36–11–8; Pac-10: 37–36–10		
Jamie Clark (Pac-12) (2011–2023)
2011	Jamie Clark	9–4	6–3	2nd	
2012	Jamie Clark	13–5–3	7–1–2	2nd	NCAA second round
2013	Jamie Clark	17–2–4	7–1–2	1st	NCAA Quarterfinals
2014	Jamie Clark	12–5–3	5–4–1	3rd	NCAA Third round
2015	Jamie Clark	8–5–6	4–3–3	3rd	
2016	Jamie Clark	14–7	7–4	2nd	NCAA Third round
2017	Jamie Clark	12–7–1	5–4–1	3rd	NCAA first round
2018	Jamie Clark	12–7–1	6–4–0	3rd	NCAA first round
2019	Jamie Clark	15–3	8–2	1st	NCAA Quarterfinals
2020	Jamie Clark	12–4–0	7–3–0	2nd	NCAA Quarterfinals
2021	Jamie Clark	18–2–2	6–1–2	2nd	NCAA Runner Up
2022	Jamie Clark	15–2–3	7–1–2	1st	NCAA Second round
2023	Jamie Clark	5–6–7	2–4–4	5th	
Jamie Clark (Big Ten Conference) (2024–present)
2024	Jamie Clark	8–6–7	4–3–3	4th	NCAA Second round
2025	Jamie Clark	16–6–2	7–3–0	2nd	NCAA Champion
Jamie Clark:		186–73–39	Pac-12: 77–35–17; B1G :11–6–3		
Total:		701–292–132			
National champion Postseason invitational champion Conference regular season champion Conference regular season and conference tournament champion Division regular season champion Division regular season and conference tournament champion Conference tournament champion

== Rivalries ==
Seattle U; The Redhawks are the crosstown-rival of the Huskies.

As of the conclusion of the 2016 season, Washington leads the series 44–6–5. Other rivalries include Seattle Pacific, Stanford, Portland, and Simon Fraser.

== Bibliography ==
- 2011 Record Book
