= Walt Schmetzer =

American soccer player

Personal information
- Full name: Walter M. Schmetzer
- Date of birth: April 26, 1967 (age 59)
- Place of birth: Seattle, Washington, United States
- Height: 5 ft 8 in (1.73 m)
- Position: Midfielder

Youth career
- Nathan Hale High School

Senior career*
Years	Team	Apps	(Gls)
1985	F.C. Seattle		
1986–1988	Cleveland Force (indoor)	36	(3)
1988–1991	Tacoma Stars (indoor)	74	(21)
- * Club domestic league appearances and goals

Walter M. Schmetzer (born April 26, 1967, in Seattle, Washington) is a former U.S. soccer midfielder who played professionally in the Western Soccer Alliance and Major Indoor Soccer League.

Schmetzer grew up in Seattle, Washington where he attended Nathan Hale High School. He learned to play soccer under the tutelage of his father Walter who coached him with the Lake City Hawks youth team. Walter Sr., a native of Germany, had played in the German Third Division before immigrating to the United States. Schmetzer, and his twin brother Andy led Nathan Hale to the 1985 3A Washington State boys soccer championship. After graduating in 1985, both Schmetzers, along with their older brother Brian signed with F.C. Seattle of the Western Soccer Alliance. In 1986, he signed with the Cleveland Force of Major Indoor Soccer League (MISL). In 1988, he moved to the Tacoma Stars of MISL where he played for two seasons.
