= Eddie Henderson (soccer) =

American soccer player (born 1967)

Personal information
- Date of birth: September 11, 1967 (age 59)
- Place of birth: Seattle, Washington, United States
- Height: 5 ft 1 in (1.55 m)
- Positions: Forward; midfielder

Youth career
- Seattle Kickers

College career
Years	Team	Apps	(Gls)
1985–1989	Washington Huskies		(29)

Senior career*
Years	Team	Apps	(Gls)
1988–1990	Seattle Storm		
1990–1991	Milwaukee Wave (indoor)	23	(3)
1991	San Diego Sockers (indoor)	4	(0)
1991–1992	Milwaukee Wave (indoor)	40	(12)
1992–1998	Wichita Wings (indoor)	235	(94)

International career
- U.S. U17
- U.S. U23

Managerial career
- 2001: Wichita Jets
- * Club domestic league appearances and goals

Eddie Henderson (born September 11, 1967) is a retired U.S. soccer player. Henderson spent two seasons in the Western Soccer League, one in the American Professional Soccer League, one season in Major Soccer League and seven in the National Professional Soccer League. He also played for the U.S. at the U-17 and U-20 levels.

== Early life and education ==
Eddie Henderson was born on born September 11, 1967, in Seattle, Washington. He was the youngest child of Rosa Mae and Thomas Henderson, who had 17 other children.

As a youth he played for the Seattle Kickers, a local youth club, which in 1985 the Kickers won the WSYSA championship.

Henderson attended O'Dea High School. After he graduated from high school in 1985, Henderson attended the University of Washington on a soccer scholarship from 1985 to 1989, where he played on the men's soccer team. In 1989, he was a third team All-American. He finished his four years with 29 goals and 21 assists.

== Professional ==
Henderson played professional soccer in San Diego, Milwaukee, and Wichita, Kansas for nine seasons.

While in college, Henderson spent two seasons as a forward with the Seattle Storm of the Western Soccer League (WSL). In 1988, he was selected as a first team WSL All Star. In 1989, he was a second team All Star. After graduating from the University of Washington, Henderson spent one more season with the Storm, the last in its existence as it folded at the end of the 1990 season.

The Tacoma Stars of the Major Indoor Soccer League drafted Henderson, but he signed with the San Diego Sockers. The Sockers cut him four games into the 1990–1991 season and he signed with the Milwaukee Wave of the American Indoor Soccer Association in January 1991. In 1992, Henderson signed with the Wichita Wings of the National Professional Soccer League (NPSL) and remained with the team through the 1997–1998 season.

== Junior national teams ==
Henderson spent time with the U.S. U-17 and U.S. U-23 national team. He was on the roster for the U.S. at the 1987 U-20 World Cup.

== Coaching ==
After he retired from professional soccer, Henderson spent time as the junior varsity coach at O'Dea High School. He was also a coach with the Wichita Jets of PDSL for the team's single season in 2001. Now he coaches ISC Gunners

Henderson also spent time as a stockbroker in Las Vegas.

However, he was unable to remain away from soccer and he became the Kansas Director of Youth Coaching before moving to Nevada where he held the same position in 2006.

He later became Washington Director of Youth Coaching for the LFCIA WA program.
