= Joe James (soccer) =

American soccer player

Personal information
- Date of birth: March 12, 1961 (age 65)
- Place of birth: England
- Height: 5 ft 11 in (1.80 m)
- Position: Defender

Youth career
- 1979–1980: University of Tampa

Senior career*
Years	Team	Apps	(Gls)
1981–1982	Phoenix Inferno (indoor)	26	(1)
1984	F.C. Seattle		
1984–1985	Tacoma Stars (indoor)	1	(0)
1989	Seattle Storm		
- * Club domestic league appearances and goals

Joe "Joey" James (born March 12, 1961) is a retired U.S. soccer defender who played professionally in the Major Indoor Soccer League and Western Soccer Alliance.

James, the brother of Bernie James, was born in England, but grew up in Bellevue, Washington. He graduated from O'Dea High School where he was a 1979 Parade Magazine High School Soccer All American. He then attended the University of Tampa where he played on the men's soccer team from 1979 to 1980.

In 1981, James entered the North American Soccer League draft. The Portland Timbers selected him in the third round, but he never played for the Timbers. In the fall of 1981, he signed with the Phoenix Inferno of the Major Indoor Soccer League. The team released him after one season. In 1984, he played for F.C. Seattle in the 1984 F.C. Seattle Challenge Cup. That fall he joined the Tacoma Stars of the MISL, but played only one game. In 1989, he played for the Seattle Storm of the Western Soccer Alliance.
