= Gary Heale =

English footballer

Personal information
- Date of birth: 15 July 1958 (age 68)
- Place of birth: Canvey Island, Essex, England
- Position: Forward

Youth career
- Canvey Island

Senior career*
| Years | Team | Apps | (Gls) |
| 1975–1978 | Luton Town | 32 | (18) |
| 1978–1982 | Reading | 76 | (20) |
| 1982–1983 | Sparta Rotterdam | 32 | (11) |
| 1983 | San Diego Sockers | 15 | (10) |
| 1983–1988 | Tacoma Stars (indoor) | 221 | (141) |
| 1988–1989 | Los Angeles Lazers (indoor) | 48 | (37) |
| 1989–1990 | St. Louis Storm (indoor) | 44 | (13) |
| 1989 | Seattle Storm | | |
| 1990–1992 | Tacoma Stars (indoor) | 47 | (35) |
| 1994–1995 | Seattle Sounders | | |
- * Club domestic league appearances and goals

Gary John Heale (born 15 July 1958) is an English former professional footballer who played for teams in England, the Netherlands, and the United States.

Heale began his career in 1975 with Canvey Island. In 1978, he moved to Luton Town. After only one season, he was transferred to Reading, where he played until 1982. That year, he moved to Sparta Rotterdam in the Netherlands for the 1982–83 season. In 1983, he moved to the San Diego Sockers of the North American Soccer League. In the fall of 1983, he signed with the Tacoma Stars of the Major Indoor Soccer League. In 1987, he moved to the Los Angeles Lazers, then to St. Louis Storm. In 1988, he spent one season with the Seattle Storm in the Western Soccer League and the Seattle Sounders of the A-League. In 1994, he signed with the Seattle Sounders in the A-League.

He was the head coach of the Washington Premier FC Academy in Tacoma, Washington alongside Jimmy McAlister. They coached the team to the USSF National Finals taking fifth place. In 2018 he was named head coach of Premier Development League side Wake FC. He is also a coach in their youth program.
