= Brian Schmetzer =

American soccer coach and retired player (born 1962)

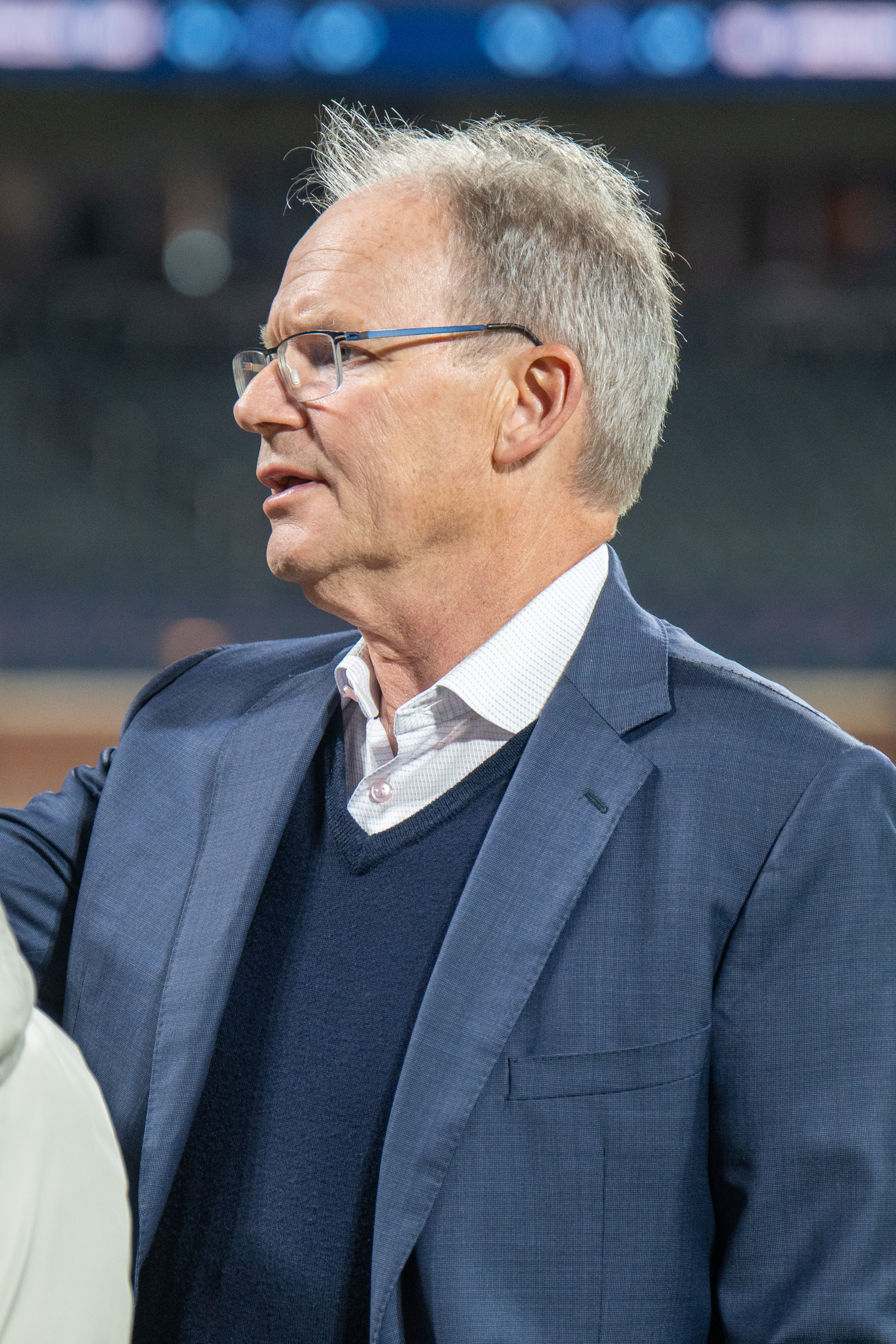
- Schmetzer in 2025

Personal information
- Full name: Brian Thomas Schmetzer
- Date of birth: August 18, 1962 (age 64)
- Place of birth: Seattle, Washington, U.S.
- Height: 5 ft 11 in (1.80 m)
- Positions: Forward; midfielder

Team information
- Current team: Seattle Sounders FC (head coach)

Youth career
- 1970–1980: Lake City Hawks

Senior career*
| Years | Team | Apps | (Gls) |
| 1980–1983 | Seattle Sounders | 38 | (1) |
| 1980–1981 | Seattle Sounders (indoor) | 12 | (4) |
| 1983–1984 | Tulsa Roughnecks (indoor) | 31 | (8) |
| 1984 | Tulsa Roughnecks | 20 | (1) |
| 1984–1988 | San Diego Sockers (indoor) | 149 | (17) |
| 1985 | → F.C. Seattle (loan) | ? | (3) |
| 1988–1990 | Tacoma Stars (indoor) | 56 | (17) |
| 1990–1991 | St. Louis Storm (indoor) | 48 | (9) |
| 1994 | Seattle Sounders | | |
| 1995 | Seattle SeaDogs (indoor) | 9 | (3) |

Managerial career
- 1988–1989: Tacoma Stars (assistant)
- 1996–1997: Seattle SeaDogs (assistant)
- 2002–2008: Seattle Sounders
- 2009–2016: Seattle Sounders FC (assistant)
- 2016–: Seattle Sounders FC
- * Club domestic league appearances and goals

Brian Thomas Schmetzer (born August 18, 1962) is an American soccer coach and former professional player. He is the head coach of Seattle Sounders FC of Major League Soccer (MLS), having been assistant coach for the team until Sigi Schmid's departure in 2016. Prior to that, he coached the Seattle Sounders in the USL First Division for seven seasons, winning two championships, and played in the North American Soccer League, Major Indoor Soccer League and Western Soccer League for various Seattle teams.

Under Schmetzer's tenure as head coach of the Sounders, they have won two MLS Cups, the 2022 CONCACAF Champions League, and the 2025 Leagues Cup.

== Early life ==
Schmetzer was born and grew up in Seattle where he attended Nathan Hale High School. He learned to play soccer under the tutelage of his father Walter, who coached him with the Lake City Hawks youth team and led them to multiple state championships. Walter, a native of Germany, had played in the German Third Division before immigrating to the United States in 1962, opening a sporting goods store in Lake City. Walter instilled a love for the game in Brian, who became an outstanding youth and high school soccer player.

== Professional career ==
=== NASL ===
After graduating from high school, Schmetzer chose to forego college and signed with the Seattle Sounders of the North American Soccer League (NASL) in June 1980. He spent the 1980 season with the Sounders reserves before playing with the Sounders during the 1980–1981 NASL indoor season. In the 1981 Trans-Atlantic Challenge Cup, he came on with eight minutes left in the game against Celtic, making his professional debut. However, he saw no time in the 1981 regular season. Schmetzer debuted during the 1982 season, playing six games, and was later elevated to regular appearances in 1983. He scored his first goal for his club on June 25, 1983, during a 2–0 win over the San Diego Sockers at Jack Murphy Stadium. Unfortunately, the Sounders folded at the end of the season in September 1983. During his final season with the Sounders, coach Laurie Calloway called Schmetzer a "different player [than before]", praising his confidence and said that he believed that Schmetzer could become one of the top American players in the league.

With the demise of the Sounders, Schmetzer moved to the Tulsa Roughnecks for the 1983–84 NASL indoor season, but later filed for free agency. However, the league collapsed at the end of the season.

=== Indoor ===
Schmetzer moved again, this time to the San Diego Sockers. The Sockers had begun as an NASL franchise, but had twice spent the winter playing in Major Indoor Soccer League (MISL). With the collapse of the NASL, the Sockers moved permanently to MISL. During the next decade they dominated the indoor league and won championships nearly every season. Schmetzer was with the Sockers for four seasons, winning an MISL title in three of them.

Following the Sockers championship victory in 1985, San Diego loaned Schmetzer to F.C. Seattle of the Western Soccer Alliance. The team was created in 1984 after the Sounders folded to provide local and ex-NASL players an opportunity to play outside of local rec leagues. Jimmy Gabriel coached F.C. Seattle that season. Gabriel and Schmetzer would join up again when Schmetzer became head coach of the Sounders with Gabriel as his assistant. He was joined by his younger brothers Andy and Walt in 1985, signing with the club out of high school. While Schmetzer played as a midfielder with Seattle, he scored both goals in a 2–1 victory over Brazilian club Santos on June 8, 1985. In August 1988, Schmetzer moved to the Tacoma Stars. While there, he began his coaching career as an assistant coach with the Stars while also playing. Schmetzer played for the St. Louis Storm of the MISL for the 1990–91 season. At the end of the season in April 1991, he retired from playing; during his indoor career, Schmetzer played 415 matches and scored 67 goals.

In 1994, he came out of retirement to sign a one-year contract with the expansion Seattle Sounders of the American Professional Soccer League. In 1995, he played for the Seattle SeaDogs of the Continental Indoor Soccer League at the age of 32, after being selected in the league draft.

== Coaching career ==
While Schmetzer began his coaching career as a player-assistant coach with the Tacoma Stars, he became a dedicated assistant coach when he moved to the Seattle SeaDogs of the Continental Indoor Soccer League (CISL) in 1995. Fernando Clavijo coached the SeaDogs, which lasted only three seasons before the league folded. However, they did win the CISL championship their last season, 1997. Schmetzer spent a few years with the Emerald City Football Club, coaching youth soccer, while also managing a construction business shared with Dick McCormick.

=== United Soccer League ===
After the 2001 season, the Seattle Sounders found themselves without a head coach after firing Bernie James, their first and until then only coach. General manager Adrian Hanauer called Schmetzer and asked him if he was interested in the job, interviewing the then-youth coach at a coffee shop on Capitol Hill. Schmetzer agreed and took the job in November 2001, with the 2002 season to make his mark on the team's fortunes. During his first season as head coach, the Sounders logged a 23–4–1 record, the second-best record in A-League history, and Schmetzer was named Coach of the Year. The Sounders' record, including a 14–2–0 start, was credited to Schmetzer's use of veteran players and key free-agent signings to boost offensive capabilities. In 2004, he coached the Sounders to the A-League championship game where the team lost to the Montreal Impact. In 2005, Schmetzer again took the Sounders to the championship game (under the re-branded USL First Division), and defeated the Richmond Kickers in penalty kicks to take the title.

Schmetzer was a finalist for the 2007 USL-1 Coach of the Year Award. Although the team had started the season 1–3–4, they went on to claim the Commissioner's Cup for the league's best regular-season record. The team also had a 15-game unbeaten run that included MLS opponents in the U.S. Open Cup. The Sounders went on to beat the Atlanta Silverbacks 4–0 to win the league championship. He amassed a 100–57–41 regular-season record in the A-League and USL-1 and led the Sounders to two league championships and two U.S. Open Cup semifinals.

=== Major League Soccer ===
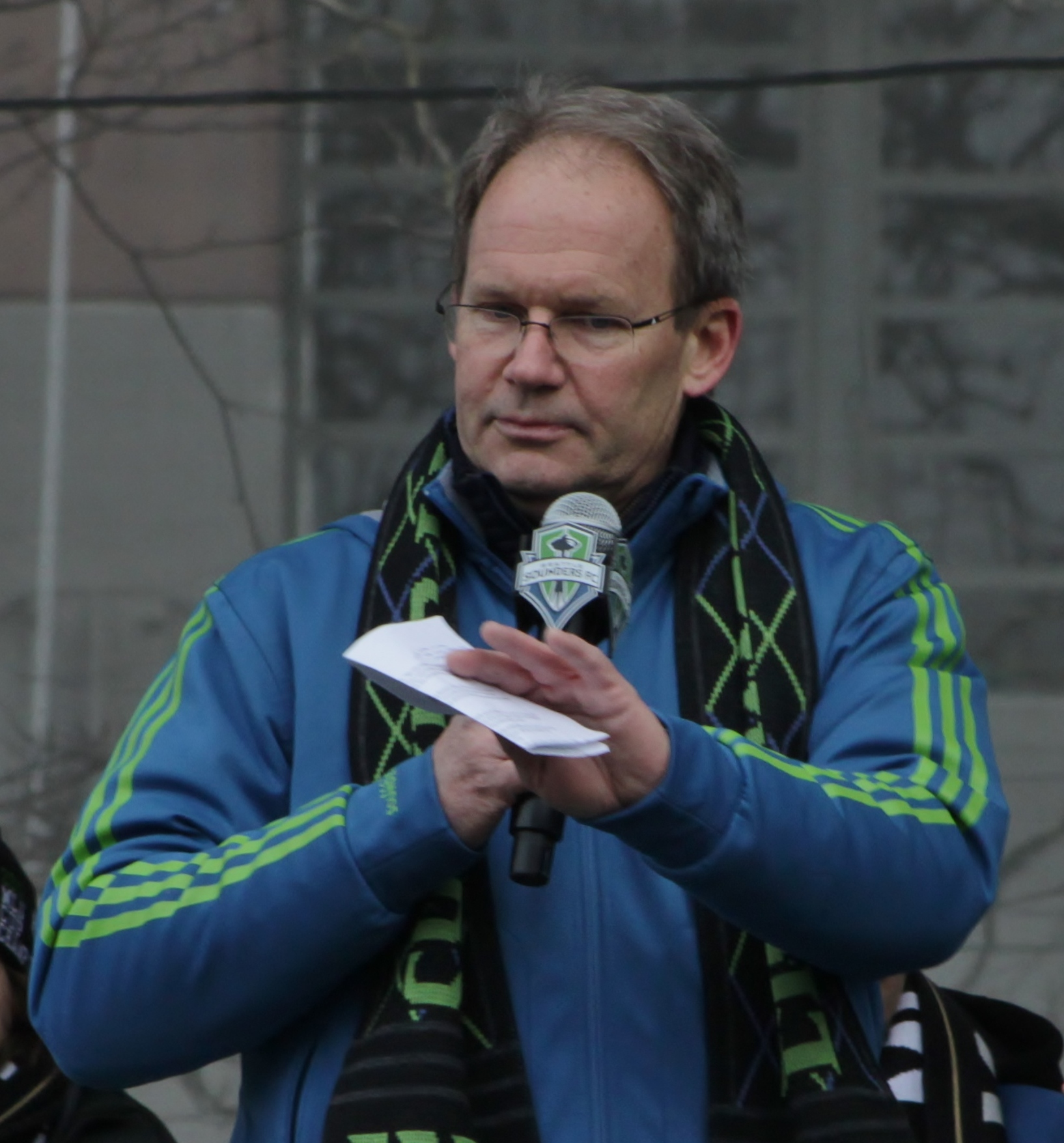
Schmetzer speaking at a victory rally at Seattle Center following the team's MLS Cup 2016 victory

Schmetzer was a candidate for the head coach position with Seattle Sounders FC. The job eventually went to Sigi Schmid, who had previously coached the Los Angeles Galaxy and Columbus Crew, while Schmetzer took the role as the top assistant. Schmezter filled in as head coach of the team in place of Schmid on four occasions from 2009 to 2015, winning three matches and losing one. During his time as assistant coach, Schmetzer was interviewed for head coach positions at Montreal Impact in 2011 and FC Dallas in 2013.

On July 26, 2016, Schmetzer was named interim head coach of the Sounders after the departure of Sigi Schmid. He was announced as the club's permanent head coach on November 2, after leading the Sounders to the 2016 MLS Cup Playoffs. The Sounders would win their first MLS Cup on December 10, 2016, defeating Toronto FC in a penalty shootout, and repeated as Western Conference champions the following season. After losing to Toronto FC in a rematch at MLS Cup 2017, Schmetzer publicly set a goal for the Sounders to host an MLS Cup final in Seattle, which would be accomplished two seasons later. Schmetzer said, "Great coaches see the full person first, the athlete second. They understand that wins come and losses go, but the lives they shape endure. Master that balance and you lift others beyond constraints."

During the 2018 season, the Sounders started slowly once again, winning only 4 games, 5 draws, and 9 losses in the first 18 weeks. However, after a week 18 draw, the club would break the MLS record for most consecutive wins in the post-shootout era, winning nine consecutive matches before eventually losing to the Philadelphia Union on September 19. Seattle then faced the Portland Timbers in the Conference Semifinals, losing the away leg 2–1 and winning the home leg 3–2 to tie the series on aggregate after extra time. In the ensuing penalty shootout, Portland won 4–2; the home leg is considered to be one of the best playoff matches in league history due to its dramatic finish.

The next season, Schmetzer led the team to a second-place finish in the Western Conference. During the playoffs, the Sounders would defeat the Supporters' Shield winning-team LAFC in the Conference Finals, leading them to face Toronto FC in the MLS Cup final for the third time in 4 years. The Sounders won the game 3–1 in front of a franchise-record 69,274 fans at CenturyLink Field. It would be Schmetzer's second MLS Cup with the team, and including the two League championships he won as manager of the USL Sounders, his fourth overall championship for Seattle.

In the 2022 CONCACAF Champions League Final, Schmetzer guided his team to win 5–2 on aggregate against UNAM, in which the Sounders became the first MLS team to win the competition, and the first to win any continental championship since 2000. It was the sixth competition final that the Sounders had played in the seven MLS seasons Schmetzer had coached the team.

Schmetzer earned his 100th MLS win on April 1, 2023, against the LA Galaxy in the regular season. It was his 212th match in charge and made him the third-fastest coach in league history to reach 100 victories behind Bob Bradley and Bruce Arena—both during the shootout era.

On August 31, 2025, Schmetzer would lead the Sounders to win the 2025 Leagues Cup, defeating Lionel Messi and Inter Miami 3–0 in the final at Lumen Field in front of a crowd of 69,314.

== Coaching record ==
As of 19 November 2026

| Team | League | From | To | Record^{3} | | | | | | | |
| Team | League | From | To | G | W | D | L | GF | GA | GD | Win % |
|---|---|---|---|---|---|---|---|---|---|---|---|
| Seattle Sounders | USL | November 29, 2001 | December 16, 2008^{1} | 239 | 121 | 48 | 70 | 372 | 266 | +106 | 50.63 |
| Seattle Sounders FC | MLS | July 26, 2016^{2} | present | 430 | 196 | 106 | 128 | 668 | 515 | +153 | 45.58 |
| Total | | | | 669 | 317 | 154 | 198 | 1,040 | 781 | +259 | 47.38 |

1.Team dissolved
2.Interim as assistant coach; later promoted to head coach
3.Includes league, U.S. Open Cup, playoffs, Leagues Cup, CONCACAF Champions League, and FIFA Club World Cup matches.

== Personal life ==
Schmetzer lives in Seattle with his wife Kirstine. They have six children and several grandchildren.

== Honors ==
=== Player ===
San Diego Sockers (MISL)

- Major Indoor Soccer League Championship (3): 1984–85, 1985–86, 1987–88

=== Coach ===
Seattle Sounders (USL)

- USL: 2005, 2007
- Commissioner's Cup: 2002, 2007
- USL A-League Western Conference: 2004
- USL A-League Pacific Division: 2002, 2003
- Cascadia Cup: 2006, 2007

Seattle Sounders FC (as assistant coach)

- U.S. Open Cup: 2009, 2010, 2011, 2014; runner-up: 2012
- Supporters' Shield: 2014; runner-up: 2011
- Cascadia Cup: 2011, 2015

Seattle Sounders FC

- CONCACAF Champions Cup: 2022
- MLS Cup: 2016, 2019; runner-up: 2017, 2020
- Western Conference: 2016, 2017, 2019, 2020
- Leagues Cup: 2025; runner-up: 2021
- Cascadia Cup: 2018, 2019, 2021
