= Tommy Jenkins =

English footballer

Personal information
- Full name: Thomas Ernest Jenkins
- Date of birth: 2 December 1947 (age 78)
- Place of birth: Bethnal Green, England
- Height: 5 ft 9 in (1.75 m)
- Position: Outside left

Senior career*
Years	Team	Apps	(Gls)
1966–1967	Leyton Orient	1	(0)
1967–1968	West Ham United	0	(0)
1968–1969	Margate	76	(13)
1969	Reading	21	(5)
1969–1972	Southampton	84	(4)
1972–1975	Swindon Town	100	(4)
1976–1979	Seattle Sounders	41	(2)
1979–1980	Pittsburgh Spirit (indoor)	10	(0)
1980–1982	Phoenix Inferno (indoor)	47	(7)

Managerial career
- 1984: F.C. Seattle
- 1988–1989: Seattle Storm
- 1995–1996: Seattle SeaDogs
- * Club domestic league appearances and goals

Thomas Ernest Jenkins (born 2 December 1947) is an English retired footballer. He played professionally in two continents as a winger and is now a soccer coach in the United States.

== Early career ==
Born in Bethnal Green, Jenkins played for East London Schoolboys before joining Leyton Orient in January 1966. He only made one first-team appearance before moving on to West Ham United in December 1967. He never broke into West Ham's first-team and moved to non-league football with Margate at the end of January 1968. He remained with Margate until July 1969 when he was transferred to Reading.

== Reading ==
In July 1969, Reading snapped him up from Margate for £500. However, Margate negotiated a condition to his transfer that Reading would pay an additional £1000 if Jenkins made ten appearances for Reading. His form was such that, after only half a season of 21 games, in December 1969, Ted Bates signed him for £60,000 for Southampton.

== Southampton ==
He made his debut for Southampton at home to Nottingham Forest on 13 December 1969, where he took the place of long-time club servant, John Sydenham, on the left-wing. At his best, Jenkins was a high-class winger with great speed, dazzling trickery and the ability to beat several defenders in one run, but would exasperate his fans by dribbling himself into trouble rather than release the ball to a teammate. He was never a prolific goal-scorer, but one memorable moment came on 31 August 1970 at Upton Park, where his run took him past four West Ham players before shooting past Hammers' goalkeeper Peter Grotier. He never realised his full potential at Southampton and was sold to Swindon Town in November 1972, having made a total of 96 appearances for Southampton, scoring six goals.

== Swindon Town ==
Jenkins was bought from Southampton on 1 November 1972, for a then club record of £50,000. He was signed to replace the legendary Don Rogers, but within days of signing, the man who signed him, Dave Mackay, resigned to join Nottingham Forest.

He made his debut on 11 November 1972 in a 1–1 draw at home to Huddersfield, but was injured on his debut, and was not selected by new manager Les Allen when he returned to fitness. He didn't really feature for most of the 1972–73 season, making just 14 full and 2 substitute appearances. The following season was more productive for Jenkins, making 36 league and 5 cup appearances, but Swindon were relegated to Division Three. In January 1974, he scored his best goal for the club in an FA Cup third round match away to Portsmouth, when after just four minutes he broke down the left-wing, beat two defenders before firing home a right foot shot from the edge of the area. Swindon drew this match 3–3 but were beaten in the replay.

Jenkins remained at the club for two more seasons. Overall, in his four years at Swindon, Jenkins struggled to hold down a regular first-team place – despite being described by manager Danny Williams as the most skilful player at the club. He left the club in 1976 to play in America, having made a total of 114 appearances with 5 goals.

== United States ==
When he arrived in the United States, he signed with the Seattle Sounders, then managed by John Best, of the North American Soccer League. He remained with the Sounders through the 1979 season, but by that time his career was waning. He was constantly hampered by a nagging groin injury. In 1978, he played only five games and in 1979, he appeared only once with the first team. When it became apparent that he would no longer play for the Sounders, he became an assistant coach with the team.

In 1980 he was contracted to play with ASL expansion team the Phoenix Fire, but the team folded in pre-season.

However, in 1981 he began a three-year period of playing indoor soccer with the MISL. He began with the Pittsburgh Spirit before moving to the Phoenix Inferno.

In 1984, he became the head coach of the amateur F.C. Seattle for the F.C. Seattle Challenge '84, a series of exhibition games against NASL and national teams. He returned to F.C. Seattle, now known as the F.C. Seattle Storm for the 1988 Western Soccer League season, replacing Scotsman Jimmy Gabriel. That year, Seattle ran away with the league championship, defeating the San Jose Earthquakes 5–0. While Jenkins returned for the 1989 season, it did not go as well and he resigned at the end of the season to be replaced by Stuart Lee.

He later coached the CISL Seattle SeaDogs. Tommy was appointed as coaching director for a local girls youth club in Washington. Over the years he has coached many boys and girls youth teams. He currently resides in Washington and coaches youth soccer in Seattle, Washington.

== Teammates ==
Jimmy Gabriel and Tommy were teammates at Southampton, Swindon Town and Seattle Sounders. They continued coaching in the Seattle area long after the NASL disbanded. Four-Four-Two, the English football magazine, had an article on the impact of the NASL imports as youth coaches in the USA.

Jenkins continues to live in the Seattle area where his son, Steve, is teammates with sons of four other former Sounders.

== Memories ==
In Southampton the old time fans still remember Tommy in their songs:
"Tommy Jenkins on the wings, 6ft 2 eyes are blue, Jimmy Steele is after you ..."
