= Tad Willoughby =

American soccer player

Personal information
- Date of birth: September 8, 1960 (age 66)
- Place of birth: Oregon, United States
- Height: 5 ft 7 in (1.70 m)
- Position: Midfielder

Youth career
- 1979–1982: University of Washington

Senior career*
Years	Team	Apps	(Gls)
1984	Seattle Storm		
1983–1986	Tacoma Stars (indoor)	20	(2)
1986–1989	Seattle Storm		
- * Club domestic league appearances and goals

Tad Willoughby (born September 8, 1960) is a retired American soccer midfielder who played four seasons in the Western Soccer Alliance and three in the Major Indoor Soccer League.

== Playing ==
Willoughby grew up in Bellevue, Washington. He attended the University of Washington where he played soccer from 1979 to 1983. In 1984, he joined F.C. Seattle for the F.C. Seattle Challenge Series which pitted the team against three North American Soccer League teams. He did not play for Seattle in 1985, but rejoined the team in 1986 and played through the 1989 season. In 1986, Seattle coach Jimmy Gabriel installed Willoughby as the team's primary playmaker. He retired from playing following the 1989 season. Willoughby served as the team's ticket manager until released in February 1990. Willoughby had also spent three seasons for the Tacoma Stars in the Major Indoor Soccer League.
