= Jimmy McAlister =

American soccer player and coach

Personal information
- Date of birth: May 4, 1957 (age 69)
- Place of birth: Seattle, Washington, United States
- Height: 5 ft 8 in (1.73 m)
- Position: Defender

Senior career*
Years	Team	Apps	(Gls)
1976–1979	Seattle Sounders	79	(2)
1979–1980	Buffalo Stallions (indoor)	31	(9)
1980	Toronto Blizzard	8	(0)
1981–1983	San Jose Earthquakes	60	(0)
1982–1983	Golden Bay Earthquakes (indoor)	3	(0)
1983–1986	Tacoma Stars (indoor)	106	(11)
1989	Seattle Storm		

International career
1977–1979	United States	6	(0)

Managerial career
- 1988: Tacoma Stars
- 2000–2005: Decatur High School
- 2006: Hibernian Saints
- * Club domestic league appearances and goals

Jimmy McAlister (born May 4, 1957) is a U.S. soccer defender during the 1970s and 1980s. He was the 1977 NASL Rookie of the Year and earned six caps with the U.S. national team.

== Player ==
=== Professional ===
McAlister was born in Seattle where he attended John F. Kennedy High School. When he graduated in 1976, the Seattle Sounders of the North American Soccer League immediately signed him to play left back. McAlister saw time in only two first team games in 1976, spending most of his time in the reserve team. In 1977, he became an integral part of a strong Sounders team which went to the NASL championship only to lose to the Pelé-led New York Cosmos. McAlister's defensive abilities led to Pelé trading his jersey with McAlister at the end of the game. His outstanding season led to McAlister receiving NASL Rookie of the Year. McAlister spent one more season with Seattle before being traded to Toronto Blizzard. Before moving to Toronto, he spent the 1979–1980 Major Indoor Soccer League season with the Buffalo Stallions. After one year in Toronto, he moved, this time to the San Jose Earthquakes. While in San Jose, he played in both the NASL and the Major Indoor Soccer League (MISL) as the Earthquakes jumped between the two leagues. When the Tacoma Stars was established as an MISL franchise in 1983, McAlister moved back home. He remained with the Stars through the 1985–1986 season.

=== National team ===
McAlister earned six caps with the United States men's national soccer team between 1977 and 1979. His success with the Sounders brought McAlister to the attention of the national team. He earned his first cap in a September 18, 1977 loss to Guatemala. He then played only sporadically over the next two years with his last cap coming in a February 11, 1979 loss to the Soviet Union.

== Coach ==
McAlister retired from the Tacoma Stars in 1986. He then became the team's Special Events Manager. On February 23, 1988, McAlister was named head coach after the Stars fired Alan Hinton. McAlister took the Stars to the playoffs where they fell in the first round to the San Diego Sockers. New ownership took over the team during the 1988 off-season and brought Hinton back in as coach. In 2000, McAlister became the head coach of the Decatur High School boys soccer team. The next season, he coached them to an undefeated season and the Washington State 4A championship. McAlister was head coach of professional club Hibernian Saints in 2006. He also served on the coaching staff of Washington Premier Football Club in Tacoma, Washington where alongside Gary Heale, he took the club's United States Soccer Development Academy team to the USSF national finals, taking 5th place. In January 2010, he returned to the city where he made his mark as a professional player, becoming the Director of Coaching of the Seattle United youth soccer club, as part of a coaching leadership team that also includes Technical Director and ex-Seattle Sounder Jason Farrell.
