= Benny Dargle =

American soccer player (born 1957)

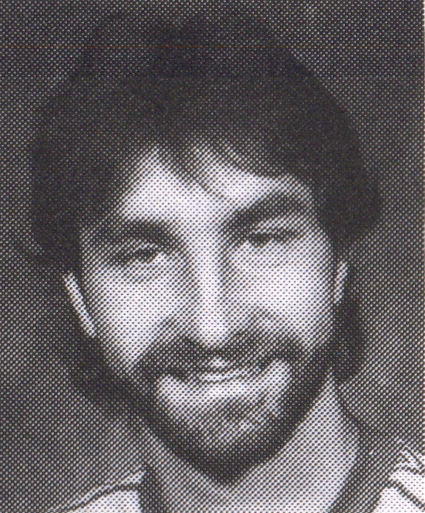
- Dargle circa 1984

Personal information
- Full name: Bernard Dargle
- Date of birth: 2 January 1957 (age 69)
- Place of birth: Liverpool, England
- Height: 5 ft 11 in (1.80 m)
- Position: Defender

Youth career
- 1975–1977: Akron Zips

Senior career*
Years	Team	Apps	(Gls)
1978	Cleveland Cobras	23	(5)
1979–1980	Detroit Express	38	(0)
1979–1980	Detroit Express (indoor)	12	(1)
1981	Washington Diplomats	31	(0)
1982–1983	Seattle Sounders	61	(0)
1983–1988	Cleveland Force (indoor)	247	(42)
1989–1990	Cleveland Crunch (indoor)	51	(6)
1990–1993	Canton Invaders (indoor)		
1996	Canton Invaders (indoor)	3	(0)
Total		440	(49)

Managerial career
- –1992: Canton Invaders
- * Club domestic league appearances and goals

Bernard "Benny" Dargle (born 2 January 1957) is an American retired professional soccer player who played as a defender, making over 400 career appearances in a professional career which lasted from 1978 to 1992.

== Career ==
Dargle was born in Liverpool, England and played college soccer for the University of Akron from 1975 to 1977. He began his professional career in 1978 with the Cleveland Cobras of the American Soccer League before moving to the Detroit Express of the North American Soccer League in 1979. He played two outdoor seasons and one indoor season with the Express before moving to the Washington Diplomats in 1981. The Dips folded at the end of the season and on October 6, 1981, the Seattle Sounders selected Dargle first in the dispersal draft. He finished his NASL career with the Sounders in 1983. When the Sounders folded at the end of the 1983 season, the Vancouver Whitecaps selected Dargle in the dispersal draft, but he did not sign with that team. Instead, he turned to indoor soccer with the Cleveland Force of the Major Indoor Soccer League with whom he played five seasons. On June 16, 1988, the Force released Dargle, along with several other players, as the team folded. Dargle remained in Cleveland after no other MISL team signed him. In the summer of 1989, Dargle was signed by the expansion Cleveland Crunch after a successful trial. On June 20, 1990, Dargle became a free agent when the Crunch allowed his contract to lapse. He then moved to the Canton Invaders of the American Indoor Soccer Association. He became the head coach during the 1990–91 season and remained so until resigning in July 1992. He continued to play until the end of the 1992–93 season. In January 1996, he returned to the Invaders on a fifteen-day contract.
