= Mark Peterson (soccer) =

American soccer player

Personal information
- Date of birth: April 19, 1960
- Place of birth: Tacoma, Washington, United States
- Date of death: July 7, 2011 (aged 51)
- Place of death: Tacoma, Washington, United States
- Height: 5 ft 11 in (1.80 m)
- Position: Forward

Youth career
- Norpoint Royals

Senior career*
Years	Team	Apps	(Gls)
1980–1983	Seattle Sounders	99	(48)
1980–1981	Seattle Sounders (indoor)	18	(15)
1983	→ Team America (loan)	7	(1)
1983–1986	Tacoma Stars (indoor)	127	(79)
1987	Seattle Storm		

International career
1980–1985	United States	6	(1)
- * Club domestic league appearances and goals

Mark Peterson (April 19, 1960 – July 7, 2011) was an American soccer forward who played professionally in the North American Soccer League, Major Indoor Soccer League and Western Soccer Alliance. He also earned six caps, scoring one goal, with the United States men's national soccer team.

== Youth ==
Peterson was born and raised in Tacoma, Washington, where he attended Wilson High School. He played soccer at Wilson, as well as for the Norpoint Royals Soccer Club.

== Professional ==
Peterson elected to forgo college and joined the Seattle Sounders development program in 1979. This was the Sounders' sixth season in the North American Soccer League (NASL). In 1980, he was called up to the first team where he had an immediate impact. In 34 games that year, he scored 18 goals. He came in second for 1980 Rookie of the Year to Jeff Durgan of the New York Cosmos, a youth teammate of Peterson's at the Norpoint Royals. In 1981, Peterson experienced a sophomore slump, scoring only five goals in 21 games, but came back strongly in 1982 to bag 19 goals in 38 games and take the 1982 North American Player of the Year honors.

In 1983, the U.S. Soccer Federation (USSF) had placed the national team, known as Team America into the NASL as one of the league's franchises. They did this in order to create a more unified and successful team. However, several top U.S. players, Peterson included, chose not to join Team America. This sparked considerable consternation and bitterness within the national team as players with Team America criticized those who remained with their NASL teams. The pressure on USSF and Team America mounted as the national team performed poorly. Finally, USSF negotiated an agreement with the other NASL teams to allow them to loan U.S. players to Team America when they were not needed. This resulted in Peterson playing 21 games in 1983 for the Sounders and 7 games for Team America. Both the Sounders and Team America folded at the end of the 1983 season.

On October 2, 1983, Peterson was selected by the New York Cosmos in the Sounders' dispersal draft. He never played for the Cosmos as the NASL began to collapse. On November 24, 1983, he signed a two-year contract with Tacoma Stars of Major Indoor Soccer League. He led the team in scoring during the 1983–1984 season. In March 1987, he signed with F.C. Seattle in the Western Soccer Alliance.

== National team ==
Despite his proven scoring ability, Peterson earned only six caps with the United States men's national soccer team between 1980 and 1985. In 1980, he was still a young player and had difficulty breaking into the U.S. front line of Boris Bandov, Steve Moyers and Angelo DiBernardo. In 1981 and 1982, the national team played only a single game each year, Peterson had no part in either one. His last game was a 1–1 World Cup Qualifier tie with Costa Rica on May 26, 1985.

Peterson coached the North Tacoma Soccer Club until his death on July 7, 2011.
