= Jeff Durgan =

American soccer player

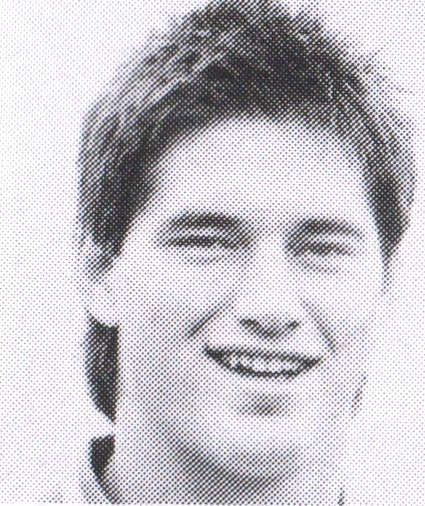
- Durgan circa 1984

Personal information
- Full name: Jeffrey D. Durgan
- Date of birth: August 29, 1961 (age 65)
- Place of birth: Tacoma, Washington, United States
- Height: 6 ft 2 in (1.88 m)
- Position: Defender

Senior career*
Years	Team	Apps	(Gls)
1980–1982	New York Cosmos	81	(0)
1981–1982	New York Cosmos (indoor)	13	(3)
1983	Team America	27	(0)
1983–1984	New York Cosmos	13	(0)
1984	New York Cosmos (indoor)	24	(2)
1984–1985	New York Cosmos (MISL)	14	(0)
1985	F.C. Seattle	4	(0)

International career
1983–1985	United States	7	(1)
- * Club domestic league appearances and goals

Jeffrey Durgan (born August 29, 1961, in Tacoma, Washington) is a retired U.S. soccer defender who played professionally for the New York Cosmos and seven times for the U.S. national team.

== NASL ==
Durgan was born and raised in Tacoma, Washington, where he attended Stadium High School. After graduating, Durgan turned professional with the New York Cosmos of the North American Soccer League (NASL), debuting in April 1980. In his first year in the league he started 28 of the Cosmos' 32 regular games. Showing what sportswriter George Vecsey called "a controlled aggressiveness characteristic of a player far beyond his years", he was named the league's Rookie of the Year, beating Tacoma youth teammate Mark Peterson of the Seattle Sounders. In 1982, he was selected as a second team NASL All Star. Durgan won the Soccer Bowl, the NASL championship, with the Cosmos in 1980 and 1982, but they lost in 1981 to the Chicago Sting after a penalty shootout.

In 1983, the U.S. Soccer Federation attempted to create a more successful U.S. national team by entering the team into the NASL as a franchise, known as Team America. USSF then invited players from throughout the NASL, Major Indoor Soccer League (MISL) and American Soccer League to leave their teams to play for Team America. Although he expressed doubts about the new team, Durgan left the Cosmos and signed with Team America, who he captained. Many top players stayed with their previous clubs, something Durgan criticized, saying "let them come and help. You have to get off the fence." Team America ended the season at the bottom of the league and when USSF pulled the national team from the NASL at the end of the 1983 season, Durgan rejoined the Cosmos. In May 1984, the Cosmos asked Durgan and two other players to take a 20% pay cut, and another to take a 45% pay cut. When they refused to accept the cuts the team waived them, and then re-signed Durgan and two other players for less pay after the other eight teams in the NASL declined to sign them under the terms of their original contracts.

When the league folded after the 1984 season, the Cosmos moved to the MISL, but did not make it through the end of the 1984–1985 season before folding.

== F.C. Seattle ==
When the Cosmos collapsed, Durgan moved back to the Seattle area to sign with the semi-professional F.C. Seattle in the MISL on May 20, 1985, and he captained the team. Seattle coach Bruce Rioch released Durgan from the team on July 29, 1985, after an incident involving a tackle with Canadian player John Catliff.

== National team ==
Durgan earned seven caps with the U.S. national team between 1983 and 1985. He scored one goal. He was also part of the U.S. Olympic team at the 1984 Summer Olympics in Los Angeles. Due to a leg injury he only played in the third match, against Egypt, and had to retire in the first half. The game was a 1–1 draw and ended the U.S.'s progression in the tournament.

Durgan was named 46th of the top 50 athletes of the 20th century from Washington State by Sports Illustrated.

== Personal life ==
After retiring from soccer, Durgan earned a bachelor's degree from the University of Washington. Durgan currently lives in Michigan with his wife and three children.
