= Rick Davis =

American soccer player (born 1958)

Personal information
- Full name: Richard Dean Davis
- Date of birth: November 24, 1958 (age 67)
- Place of birth: Denver, Colorado, United States
- Height: 5 ft 8 in (1.73 m)
- Position: Midfielder

College career
Years	Team	Apps	(Gls)
1977	Santa Clara Broncos		

Senior career*
Years	Team	Apps	(Gls)
1978–1984	New York Cosmos	129	(15)
1981–1982	New York Cosmos (indoor)	17	(3)
1983–1986	St. Louis Steamers (indoor)	123	(89)
1986–1987	New York Express (indoor)	23	(7)
1987–1990	Tacoma Stars (indoor)	98	(31)
1989	Seattle Storm		

International career
1977–1988	United States	35	(7)
- * Club domestic league appearances and goals

Richard Dean Davis (born November 24, 1958) is an American former soccer midfielder, and former captain of the U.S. national team for much of the 1980s. He is considered by fans the best U.S.-born player of the North American Soccer League era and is a member of the National Soccer Hall of Fame.

== Youth ==
Davis was born in Denver, Colorado, and began playing soccer at the age of seven for an AYSO soccer team in Claremont, California. He was an All-American high school player at Damien High School in La Verne, California. In 1977, he played a single season of college soccer at Santa Clara University While at Santa Clara, he was a member of the Broncos team which took the U-19 National Open Championship (McGuire Cup).

== Professional ==
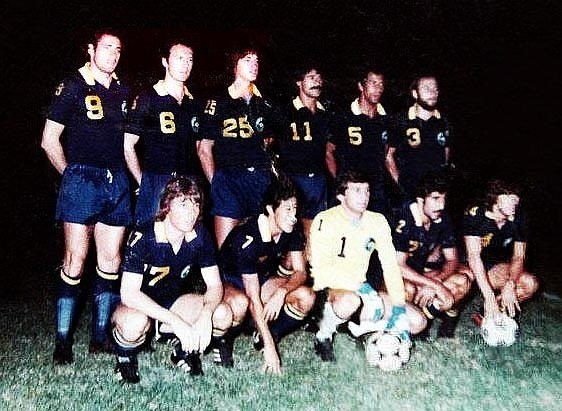
Davis (first from left, lower row, #17) with the New York Cosmos in Argentina, March 1980

An American on a team of international superstars with the New York Cosmos, he helped the team to three NASL league titles in 1978, 1980 and 1982. He began playing with the team during the 1978 season and was selected as the 1979 North American Player of the Year in his second season. He was selected as an NASL all-star Honorable Mention in the 1983 season.

In 1983, the St. Louis Steamers of the Major Indoor Soccer League signed Davis away from the Cosmos. Davis moved just in time to avoid the collapse of the Cosmos. Despite numerous nagging injuries, Davis led the Steamers in scoring and was an integral part of the team's run to the MISL championship series which the Steamers lost to the Baltimore Blast. He played one more season with the Steamers before moving to the New York Express, an MISL expansion team heavily staffed by former Cosmos players. The team lasted until the 1986-1987 All-Star break when it folded.

In March 1987, Davis moved to the Tacoma Stars for the remainder of the 1986–1987 season. In January 1989, Davis injured his knee, requiring multiple surgeries. He was on the roster for the 1989 Seattle Storm of the Western Soccer Alliance. In 1990, he retired from playing professional soccer.

== National team ==
Davis became an integral part of the U.S. national team in 1977, first with the U.S. Olympic team and U20 teams, then the senior national team. Between September 11 and October 4, 1976, the U.S. U-20 national team played the qualifying games for the 1977 FIFA World U-20 Championship. While the team went 5–2, it failed to qualify. Davis led the team scoring with eight goals. When he was 18 years old, he made his senior national team debut in a September 15, 1977 match against El Salvador. Even more, he scored his first international goal in that game. He became a regular on the team, playing in all eight U.S. matches in 1977. Davis continued to play for the Olympic team, which qualified for the 1980 Summer Olympics. However, President Carter's boycott of those games, held in Moscow, stopped the team from competing. Davis played for the U.S. in the 1984 Olympics, where he scored two goals in the U.S. victory over Costa Rica. In 1984, he was also named the U.S. Soccer Athlete of the Year, the first year of the award. He played again at the 1988 Summer Olympics. Davis' experience and leadership led him to being named captain of the U.S. national team. In this capacity, he led the team during 1988, and was looking forward to the 1990 FIFA World Cup qualifying games in 1989. However, he suffered a serious knee injury in January 1989. Although he tried to work himself back into shape in order to make the World Cup roster, U.S. coach Bob Gansler never called him back to the team, and Davis retired from playing. Overall, he earned 36 caps (a record at the time), scoring nine goals for the senior national team.

=== International Goals ===
#	Date	Venue	Opponent	Result	Goals	Competition
1	September 15, 1977	San Salvador, El Salvador	El Salvador	2–1	1	Friendly
2	February 3, 1979	Seattle, Washington	Soviet Union	1–3	1	Friendly
3	October 4, 1980	Dudelange, Luxembourg	Luxembourg	2–0	1	Friendly
4	October 7, 1980	Lisbon, Portugal	Portugal	1–1	1	Friendly
5	November 9, 1980	Mexico City, Mexico	Mexico	1–5	1	1982 World Cup Qualifying
6	March 21, 1982	Port of Spain, Trinidad	Trinidad and Tobago	2–1	1	Friendly
8	July 29, 1984	Stanford, California	Costa Rica	3–0	2	1984 Summer Olympics
9	October 9, 1984	Los Angeles, California	El Salvador	3–1	1	Friendly

== Team management ==
After his retirement from playing, Davis became the head coach and general manager of the Los Angeles Salsa of the American Professional Soccer League. In 2004, he was named Director of Programs for AYSO, and in 2006, he was named its National Executive Director. On March 9, 2010, AYSO announced the resignation of Davis effective May 11, 2010. In the fall of 2018 Rick joined the coaching staff for the Salina Central Men's Soccer Team.

== Broadcasting ==
Davis has also had a long career in soccer broadcasting. In 1989, he and JP Dellacamera provided live commentary for the match pitting the champions of the Western Soccer Alliance and the American Soccer League. He would provide television commentary at both the 1990 and 1994 World Cups for ABC. He continues to work as a commentator for Los Angeles Galaxy games.

Davis was elected to the National Soccer Hall of Fame in 2001.

== Statistics ==
=== NASL ===
Year	Team	GP	G	A	PTS
1978	Cosmos	11	0	1	1
1979	New York Cosmos	29	6	13	25
1980	New York Cosmos	14	1	8	10
1981	New York Cosmos	17	1	1	3
1982	New York Cosmos	21	0	4	4
1983	New York Cosmos	29	5	12	22
1984	New York Cosmos	8	2	2	6
TOTAL	NASL	129	15	41	71

=== MISL ===
Year	Team	GP	G	A	PTS	PIM
1983/84	St. Louis	43	36	21	57	16
1984/85	St. Louis	40	27	31	58	4
1985/86	St. Louis	40	26	29	55	12
1986/87	New York	23	7	6	13	2
	Tacoma	20	5	5	10	2
1987/88	Tacoma	53	22	29	51	12
1989/90	Tacoma	25	4	3	7	6
TOTAL	MISL	244	127	124	251	54
