= Bernie James =

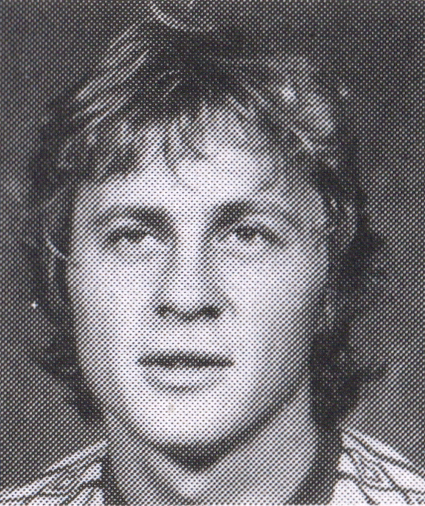
- James circa 1984

Personal information
- Full name: Bernie James
- Date of birth: November 25, 1958 (age 67)
- Place of birth: Coventry, England
- Height: 6 ft 1 in (1.85 m)
- Position: Defender

Senior career*
| Years | Team | Apps | (Gls) |
| 1977–1980 | Seattle Sounders | 0 | (0) |
| 1980–1982 | Edmonton Drillers | 74 | (1) |
| 1980–1982 | Edmonton Drillers (indoor) | 46 | (8) |
| 1982–1987 | Cleveland Force (indoor) | 208 | (18) |
| 1987–1989 | Tacoma Stars (indoor) | 102 | (7) |
| 1988–1989 | Seattle Storm | | |
| 1989–1991 | Cleveland Crunch (indoor) | 97 | (1) |
| 1994–2000 | Seattle Sounders | 108 | (0) |

International career
| 1988 | United States | 2 | (0) |

Managerial career
- 1994–2000: Seattle Sounders (assistant)
- 2001: Seattle Sounders (interim)
- 1997–: Roosevelt High School
- 1997–: Crossfire Premier Soccer Club
- * Club domestic league appearances and goals

Bernie James (born November 25, 1958, in Coventry, England) is a former U.S. soccer player and current youth soccer coach. James spent twenty-four years as a professional, both beginning and ending his career with different versions of the Seattle Sounders. He played in the North American Soccer League, Major Indoor Soccer League, American Professional Soccer League and A-League. He served as an assistant coach with the Sounders for seven seasons and as interim head coach for one. He was a member of the U.S. Olympic soccer team which qualified for, but did not play in, the 1980 Summer Olympics due to the United States' boycott in response to the Soviet invasion of Afghanistan. He also earned two caps with the U.S. national team in 1988.

== High school ==
While born in England, James grew up along with his brothers: Greg, Joe, Chris, and David and sister Tara, in Washington state. He attended Bellevue High School in Bellevue, Washington, where he was a four-year letterman on the boys' soccer team. He was named to the all League team as a senior in 1977.

== NASL ==
Rather than attending college, James chose to sign with the Seattle Sounders of the North American Soccer League (NASL) after graduating from high school. In his two and a half years with the Sounders, he never played a first team game; instead, he saw time only with the reserve team during the 1978 and 1979 seasons. The Sounders traded him to the Edmonton Drillers in 1980 where he became an integral part of the team over the next three seasons. In addition to playing outdoor with the Drillers, James was a significant part of the 1980–1981 and 1981–1982 NASL indoor seasons. In 1981, Edmonton won the NASL indoor championship over the Chicago Sting. The Drillers folded at the end of the 1982 outdoor season and James jumped to Major Indoor Soccer League (MISL).

== MISL ==
James signed with the Cleveland Force of MISL in 1982 and spent five seasons with them. He was named the 1982-1983 MISL Defender of the Year. In 1987, he moved to the Tacoma Stars for two seasons before returning to Cleveland to join the Cleveland Crunch which had replaced the Force when that team folded in 1988. James spent two more seasons in MISL with the Force, being named a second team All Star in his last season, 1990–1991.

== APSL/A-League ==
In 1988 and 1989, James played two seasons with the Seattle Storm of the Western Soccer Alliance. In 1990, the WSA merged with the American Soccer League to form the American Professional Soccer League. In April 1994, James signed with the Seattle Sounders of the (APSL) as a player/coach. He played seventeen games of the 1994 season, but was injured during the 1995 pre-season and played no games as the Sounders won the APSL championship. He returned to the field in 1996, seeing time in six games as Seattle won its second consecutive league championship. In 1997, he was fully recovered from injury, anchoring the Sounders defense during thirty-three games. That year, the APSL merged with the USISL and became known as the A-League. James announced his intention to retire during the 2000 pre-season. He played six games that year and retired at the end of the season.

== National and Olympic teams ==
In 1979, James was selected for the U.S. soccer team at the 1979 Pan Am Games. The U.S. went 2–0 in first-round group play before dropping both of its second-round group games.

In 1979 and 1980, James was part of the U.S. Olympic soccer team as it qualified for the 1980 Summer Olympics held in Moscow. However, James and his teammates were unable to compete when President Jimmy Carter boycotted the games following the Soviet Union's invasion of Afghanistan.

James earned his first cap with the U.S. national team in a 1–1 tie with Chile on January 6, 1988. Neil Megson, later coach of the Sounders, replaced James in the second half. His second national team game came on March 6, 1988. This was a 3–1 loss to Chile. James again started the game but came off for Joey Kirk.

== Coaching ==
In 1997, James was hired by Roosevelt High School in Seattle, Washington to coach its girls' soccer team. That year he also became a coach with Crossfire Premier Soccer Club. In 2003, he became the club's boys' director of coaching.

James became interim head coach of the Sounders when Neil Megson resigned on April 19, 2001. The Sounders finished the season 14-13-2 and failed to make the playoffs.

In the summer of 2023, KNKX reported allegations of an "abusive culture" among coaches at Crossfire Premier, including James. Alleged behavior by coaches included racist comments and sexual harassment towards players and staff. On July 20, 2024, KNKX reported that U.S. Soccer confirmed the coaching license suspension of Bernie James.

== Honors ==
- 1982–1983 MISL Defender of the Year
- 1990–1991 Second Team All MISL
