= List of North American Soccer League (1968–1984) players =

The following is a list of players who played at least 50 games in the North American Soccer League, a fully professional soccer league which existed in the United States and Canada between 1968 and 1984.

== List of players ==
Name	Nationality	Games	Goals	Seasons
Abrahams, Laurie	England	162	76	7
Advocaat, Dick	Netherlands	81	6	3
Aguirre, Roberto	Argentina	114	10	7
Alderson, Brian	Scotland	109	14	4
Allen, Craig	England	74	19	3
Alon, Benny	Israel	58	17	3
Alonso, Ricardo	Argentina	129	67	6
Anderson, Ian	Scotland	123	21	5
Anderson, Peter	England	51	14	3
Anderson, Willie	England	159	13	7
Apostolidis, Koulis	Greece	56	29	4
Aqui, Keith	Trinidad and Tobago	53	16	3
Archibald, Warren	Trinidad and Tobago	170	58	8
Arguelles, Rafael	Cuba	50	0	4
Artur	Portugal	53	0	2
Askew, Sonny	United States	95	13	7
Atack, Lee	England	60	2	4
Auguste, Arsène	Haiti	115	3	7
Ayre, Garry	Canada	72	1	4
Bachner, Igor	Canada	63	5	5
Bain, John	Scotland	191	50	7
Bakic, Mike	Canada	56	10	4
Ball, Alan	England	64	15	3
Bandov, Boris	United States	105	11	10
Baralić, Peter	Yugoslavia	89	21	4
Barnett, Geoff	England	67	0	5
Barto, Barry	United States	68	2	6
Barton, Frank	England	78	11	4
Beardsley, Peter	England	73	28	3
Beckenbauer, Franz	West Germany	132	21	5
Belfiore, Ivan	Canada	95	0	5
Bellinger, Tony	United States	125	0	6
Benedek, Jim	United States	64	3	6
Berrio, Jorge	Argentina	77	3	4
Best, Clyde	Bermuda	178	55	8
Best, George	Northern Ireland	169	54	6
Best, John	United States	125	0	6
Betts, Tony	England	67	13	4
Bick, Sam	United States	60	1	5
Bilecki, Zeljko	Canada	114	0	8
Birkenmeier, Hubert	West Germany	145	0	6
Blašković, Filip	Yugoslavia	52	0	3
Bloomfield, Ray	United States	79	4	6
Bogićević, Vladislav	Yugoslavia	203	31	7
Bolitho, Bob	Canada	197	21	8
Bone, Jim	Scotland	50	7	2
Borja, Chico	United States	83	20	4
Boulton, Colin	England	58	0	2
Bourne, Jeff	England	139	69	5
Bracewell, Ken	England	102	2	7
Bradford, David	England	197	26	7
Bradley, Gordon	United States	66	0	6
Brand, Jack	Canada	132	0	8
Bridge, Ian	Canada	124	13	6
Brown, Jim	Scotland	85	1	4
Brown, Tony	England	63	17	2
Busby, Drew	Scotland	51	8	2
Butler, Dave	England	118	40	7
Buttle, Steve	England	151	15	6
Byrne, David	South Africa	132	37	5
Cabañas, Roberto	Paraguay	85	60	5
Cahill, Paul	England	81	1	4
Calloway, Laurie	England	76	3	6
Calvert, Cliff	England	147	19	6
Campos, Claude	Brazil	65	0	5
Cannell, Paul	England	109	45	5
Canter, Dan	United States	69	6	3
Cantillo, Ringo	United States	164	5	8
Carenza, Chris	United States	50	0	3
Carenza, John	United States	52	5	4
Carlos Alberto	Brazil	119	8	6
Carmichael, Jack	England	82	0	3
Carr, Peter	United States	113	1	4
Caskey, Billy	Northern Ireland	155	33	6
Cave, Micky	England	75	31	4
Cawston, Mervyn	England	82	0	4
Chadwick, David	England	59	7	5
Charles, Clive	England	95	0	6
Child, Paul	United States	238	102	10
Chinaglia, Giorgio	Italy	213	193	8
Cho Young-Jeung	South Korea	77	4	3
Chursky, Tony	Canada	146	0	7
Clarke, Joe	United States	112	1	6
Cocking, John	England	104	5	6
Cohen, Neil	United States	110	3	8
Coker, Ade	United States	156	74	10
Collier, Gary	England	134	2	5
Colquhoun, Eddie	Scotland	78	4	4
Comrie, Elvis	United States	55	16	3
Conde, Leonel	Uruguay	53	0	4
Connell, Mike	South Africa	252	8	9
Conway, Jimmy	Republic of Ireland	61	7	3
Cooke, Charlie	Scotland	131	12	6
Cooper, Kenny	England	170	0	10
Costa, Renato	Brazil	53	13	5
Counce, Dan	United States	90	15	6
Coyne, John	England	66	25	3
Craven, John	England	89	10	4
Crescitelli, Tony	United States	98	12	6
Crossley, Paul	England	77	16	5
Crow, Kevin	United States	52	5	2
Crudo, Tony	United States	67	0	6
Cruyff, Johan	Netherlands	53	25	3
Cubillas, Teófilo	Peru	120	59	5
Cuéllar, Leonardo	Mexico	128	10	6
Da Veiga, Uriel	Brazil	98	4	5
D'Agostino, Paul	Canada	73	0	4
Daley, Steve	England	106	26	4
Danaeifard, Iraj	Iran	67	3	5
Dangerfield, Chris	England	212	41	10
Dargle, Benny	United States	130	0	5
Darrell, Gary	Bermuda	140	25	9
David, Steve	Trinidad and Tobago	175	100	8
Davidovic, Dimitri	Yugoslavia	59	8	2
Davies, Geoff	England	58	19	3
Davies, Roger	England	105	43	5
Davies, Ron	Wales	95	16	4
Davis, Phil	England	60	1	6
Davis, Rick	United States	129	15	7
Dawes, Malcolm	England	54	4	3
Day, Graham	England	122	9	6
DeBrito, Iris	Brazil	68	28	4
DeBrito, Pedro	United States	71	4	3
DeLeon, Leroy	Trinidad and Tobago	147	55	10
DeLuca, Pasquale	Canada	69	3	5
Demling, Buzz	United States	116	2	6
Demling, Mark	United States	68	2	7
Dempsey, John	Republic of Ireland	81	2	3
D'Errico, David	United States	121	2	7
Dewsnip, George	England	58	6	3
Deyna, Kazimierz	Poland	90	44	4
DiBernardo, Angelo	United States	95	12	6
Dillon, Mike	England	98	11	6
Dimitrijević, Vito	Yugoslavia	59	5	3
Donachie, Willie	Scotland	91	2	3
Donlavey, Frank	Scotland	87	2	4
Donnelly, Martin	Northern Ireland	116	2	5
Droege, Don	United States	174	10	7
DuBose, Winston	United States	160	0	8
DuChateau, Gene	United States	74	0	5
Durante, Eli	Brazil	124	15	7
Durgan, Jeff	United States	121	0	6
Eagan, Kevin	United States	71	0	5
Earle, Steve	England	57	5	3
Eðvaldsson, Jóhannes	Iceland	64	17	2
England, Mike	Wales	106	6	5
Ercoli, Pat	Canada	103	17	4
Escos, Francisco	Argentina	127	12	8
Eskandarian, Andranik	Iran	142	0	6
Etherington, Gary	United States	140	13	7
Evans, Ray	England	102	16	4
Evans, Willie	Ghana	70	1	5
Fabbiani, Oscar	Chile	55	40	3
Fagan, Bernie	England	93	2	7
Fajkus, Charlie	United States	151	19	6
Faulkner, John	England	87	6	4
Fazlić, Miralem	Yugoslavia	110	2	5
Ferguson, Drew	Canada	81	4	5
Fernandez, Pepe	Uruguay	77	19	6
Fernández, Vidal	Mexico	68	13	5
Fernando, Luís	Brazil	91	59	4
Ferreira, Ivair	Brazil	105	22	5
Fidelia, Pat	United States	50	17	4
Field, Tony	England	119	31	5
Figaro, Selris	Trinidad and Tobago	55	2	4
Fink, Joey	United States	72	25	6
Flater, Mike	United States	72	22	6
Fogarty, Ken	England	124	2	6
Formoso, Santiago	United States	113	3	5
Fowles, Colin	United States	140	6	8
Frank, Steve	United States	120	0	6
Frankiewicz, Kazimierz	Poland	146	42	8
Franks, Colin	England	114	11	4
Fraser, William	Scotland	92	11	4
Fryatt, Jim	England	55	16	3
Fuhrmann, Joe	West Germany	55	0	2
Furphy, Keith	England	122	43	4
Futcher, Ron	England	201	119	9
Gabriel, Jimmy	Scotland	52	7	5
Galati, Tom	United States	61	1	4
Gamaldo, Victor	Trinidad and Tobago	64	1	4
Gano, Pedro	Argentina	55	0	3
Gant, Brian	Canada	171	23	9
Gant, Bruce	Canada	59	1	5
Garbett, Terry	England	66	3	4
Garcia, Poli	United States	78	12	3
Gavrić, Momčilo	Yugoslavia	91	2	5
Gazonas, Billy	United States	68	4	4
Geimer, Gene	United States	98	25	7
Gemeri, Tibor	Canada	58	3	4
Gerber, Franz	West Germany	72	35	3
Geyer, Erich	West Germany	57	6	4
Gibbs, George	England	101	14	5
Gillett, Dave	Scotland	89	4	5
Glavin, Tony	Scotland	66	13	3
Glenn, Rudy	United States	131	15	5
Goossens, Jan	Netherlands	145	48	6
Gorman, John	Scotland	111	1	4
Granitza, Karl-Heinz	West Germany	199	128	7
Gray, Gerry	Canada	126	17	5
Greaves, Roy	England	84	4	3
Green, Alan	United States	147	82	6
Grell, Bertrand	Trinidad and Tobago	76	3	4
Grgurev, Fred	United States	52	6	6
Griffiths, Clive	Wales	142	2	6
Groß, Volkmar	West Germany	140	0	5
Peter, Gruber	West Germany	104	5	4
Haaskivi, kai	Finland	135	30	5
Hall, Bret	United States	81	1	5
Hall, Dick	England	122	0	7
Hamilton, Ian	England	119	22	5
Hamlyn, Alan	United States	80	1	8
Hammond, Paul	United States	179	0	9
Hanek, Janos	Hungary	63	4	3
Hankin, Ray	England	73	31	3
Hársányi, László	Hungary	85	2	3
Hasanbegović, Jado	Yugoslavia	74	11	5
Hausmann, Larry	United States	134	9	9
Hector, Kevin	England	63	39	3
Hewitt, Mike	Scotland	175	0	9
Hilkes, Lorenz	West Germany	98	36	6
Hill, Gordon	England	83	43	3
Hinton, Alan	England	53	5	2
Hoban, Mick	United States	135	6	8
Hope, Bob	Scotland	78	7	4
Horton, Randy	Bermuda	74	37	6
Horváth, Joe	Hungary	95	21	4
Howard, Dick	Canada	68	0	6
Hudson, Alan	England	94	2	5
Hudson, Ray	England	197	44	8
Hughes, Brian	Wales	50	2	2
Hunt, Steve	England	70	29	3
Hunter, Mike	United States	98	2	5
Hunter, Paul	Canada	72	0	5
Husband, Jimmy	England	80	22	3
Huson, Dave	Jersey	159	12	6
Iarusci, Bob	Canada	217	12	5
Iglesias, Germain	Peru	55	17	2
Ingram, Gerry	England	135	42	6
Ingram, Godfrey	England	79	37	4
Irving, David	England	105	38	5
Irwin, Bill	Northern Ireland	176	0	7
Ivanow, Mike	United States	76	0	6
James, Bernie	United States	71	1	3
Jelínek, Josef	Czech Republic	57	5	6
Johnson, Glen	Canada	59	14	4
Johnston, Willie	Scotland	59	3	3
Jokerst, Dave	United States	82	0	8
Joy, Brian	England	55	5	3
Jump, Stewart	England	178	4	7
Juracy, Luiz	Brazil	94	16	7
Kaličanin, Milonja	Yugoslavia	93	0	4
Kammerer, Manfred	West Germany	75	0	6
Kapengwe, Emment	Zambia	61	16	4
Karlsson, Conny	Sweden	54	0	2
Keelan, Kevin	England	101	0	4
Kelly, Jimmy	England	111	11	5
Kelly, Jimmy	Northern Ireland	59	3	4
Kember, Steve	England	51	7	2
Kemp, Davie	Scotland	96	0	5
Kenyon, Roger	England	50	0	3
Keough, Ty	United States	92	0	4
Keri, Mihalj	Yugoslavia	162	6	6
Kerr, John	Canada	145	22	9
Kewley, Kevin	England	95	16	4
Kidd, Brian	England	84	63	4
Kirschner, Edi	West Germany	88	37	3
Knight, Hayden	United States	74	8	5
Kodelja, Victor	Canada	185	17	8
Koutsoukos, Tasso	Canada	54	5	3
Kowalik, Janusz	Poland	50	30	3
Kozić, Refik	Yugoslavia	125	7	5
Kristensen, Jørgen	Denmark	130	25	5
Krupa, Adam	Poland	51	5	3
Largie, Henry	Jamaica	85	13	5
Lecce, Tony	Canada	67	1	4
Lechermann, Peter	West Germany	62	5	4
Lee, Stuart	England	85	15	4
Lenarduzzi, Bob	Canada	288	31	11
Lenarduzzi, Sam	Canada	162	3	9
Lettieri, Tino	Canada	161	0	8
Ley, George	England	124	8	6
Lichaba, Webster	South Africa	93	4	3
Lignos, John	United States	67	1	4
Lindsay, Mark	England	188	25	9
Liotart, Hank	United States	118	10	7
Litt, Steve	England	220	12	9
Liverić, Mark	United States	133	31	8
Lodeweges, Dwight	Netherlands	148	11	6
Lonardo, Roberto	Uruguay	91	0	5
López, José	United States	51	3	4
López, Oscar	Argentina	53	22	2
Lorimer, Peter	Scotland	127	33	5
Lowther, Shaun	Canada	57	0	5
Lukačević, Ivan	Yugoslavia	80	44	5
Lukačević, Ivan	Yugoslavia	80	44	5
Lukić, Dick	Yugoslavia	73	10	3
Lund, Flemming	Denmark	109	2	4
Lynch, Andy	Scotland	51	8	3
Lynch, Barrie	England	59	10	3
MacKay, Ike	Canada	66	6	4
Mahy, Barry	United States	113	4	7
Makowski, Greg	United States	59	5	2
Marasco, Eduardo	Argentina	105	36	5
Marcantonio, Carmine	Canada	173	6	8
Margetic, Pato	Argentina	130	42	5
Marotte, Luis	Uruguay	69	11	4
Marsh, Rodney	England	94	48	4
Martin, Eric	Scotland	58	0	3
Martin, Ray	England	63	0	4
Martinović, Radi	Yugoslavia	72	0	3
Mathieu, Frantz	Haiti	118	5	5
Matteson, Bob	United States	69	2	4
Mausser, Arnie	United States	224	0	10
Mayer, Alan	United States	166	0	8
McAlinden, Bob	England	109	17	5
McAlister, Jim	United States	140	2	8
McBride, Andy	England	62	2	3
McBride, Pat	United States	193	31	10
McCall, Walker	Scotland	61	20	4
McConville, Tom	Republic of Ireland	57	1	3
McCully, Charlie	United States	56	12	6
McCully, Henry	United States	111	15	6
McGill, David	Canada	56	4	2
McGrane, John	Canada	207	4	8
McKenzie, Duncan	England	51	17	2
McLenaghen, Mike	Canada	96	0	4
McLeod, Wes	Canada	188	34	8
McMahon, Pat	Scotland	100	2	5
McParland, Peter	Northern Ireland	54	14	2
Merrick, Alan	United States	197	13	8
Meschbach, Robert	United States	83	13	4
Messing, Shep	United States	120	0	7
Meszaros, Mike	Yugoslavia	52	13	4
Metchick, Dave	England	55	13	4
Metidieri, Carlos	United States	130	61	6
Mihailovich, Ane	United States	58	3	4
Mijatović, Nick	Yugoslavia	139	1	6
Miller, Bruce	Canada	79	7	7
Minor, Karl	Austria	72	13	5
Mitchell, Charlie	Scotland	206	5	10
Mitchell, Dale	Canada	140	43	7
Mitić, Ilija	United States	166	101	9
Moffat, Bobby	England	123	12	8
Moffat, Gus	England	120	3	7
Mokgojoa, Ken	South Africa	58	14	4
Molina, Juan Carlos	Argentina	62	11	3
Möller, Jan	Sweden	55	0	2
Moore, Johnny	United States	69	9	5
Moore, Terry	Canada	117	2	5
Morais, Nelsi	Brazil	63	1	5
Moraldo, Ramon	Trinidad and Tobago	55	2	3
Morales, Rubén	Uruguay	84	8	4
Moran, Mark	United States	74	3	5
Moreland, Vic	Northern Ireland	164	14	6
Morgan, Willie	Scotland	85	7	4
Motaung, Kaizer	South Africa	98	43	5
Moura, Siri	Brazil	96	3	4
Moyers, Steve	United States	166	65	8
Müller, Gerd	West Germany	71	38	3
Mwila, Freddie	Zambia	101	25	5
Myernick, Glenn	United States	163	2	8
Nanchoff, George	United States	74	12	4
Nanchoff, Louie	United States	55	11	3
Neeskens, Johan	Netherlands	94	17	6
Nelson, Paul	Canada	76	0	6
Neumann, Axel	West Germany	71	6	5
Newman, Ron	England	59	10	5
Newton, Graham	England	51	23	3
Nicholl, Jimmy	Northern Ireland	65	11	3
Nickeas, Mark	England	53	1	4
Nikolić, Stojan	Yugoslavia	77	1	3
Nish, David	England	85	10	3
Nogly, Peter	West Germany	105	24	4
Nogueira, Victor	United States	78	0	5
Nordqvist, Björn	Sweden	61	1	2
Norman, David	Canada	60	3	4
Nover, Peter	West Germany	115	21	5
Ntsoelengoe, Ace	South Africa	244	86	11
Nusum, Sam	Bermuda	67	0	4
Oates, Graham	England	110	22	4
O'Brien, Fran	Republic of Ireland	187	32	7
Odoi, Frank	Ghana	131	8	10
O'Hara, Tommy	United States	120	1	4
O'Hare, John	Scotland	51	15	3
O'Leary, Bob	United States	92	3	6
O'Leary, Pierce	Republic of Ireland	75	1	5
O'Neill, George	United States	52	4	4
Oostrom, André	Netherlands	62	3	3
Ord, Tommy	England	163	53	8
Orhan, Yılmaz	Turkey	89	9	5
O'Riordan, Don	Republic of Ireland	52	2	2
O'Sullivan, Matt	United States	63	0	3
Papadakis, Nick	Canada	70	19	6
Parkes, Phil	England	136	0	7
Parkinson, Andy	United States	119	32	5
Parsons, Buzz	Canada	106	17	7
Pavlović, Miro	Yugoslavia	79	5	3
Pecher, Steve	United States	98	7	5
Pelé	Brazil	56	31	3
Perau, Dieter	West Germany	53	21	2
Pesa, Njego	United States	110	33	5
Peter, Ingo	West Germany	84	28	4
Peterson, Mark	United States	106	49	5
Pilaš, Bruno	Canada	78	19	5
Pogrzeba, Norbert	Poland	63	22	2
Polak, Ted	Austria	108	6	5
Pollihan, Jim	United States	131	6	5
Poole, Mick	England	118	0	5
Popović, Don	Yugoslavia	86	2	4
Possee, Derek	England	53	17	3
Pot, John	Netherlands	62	2	3
Powell, Tony	England	67	2	3
Pratt, John	England	84	2	3
Pringle, Alex	Scotland	65	1	4
Puls, Joe	Poland	120	8	7
Quinn, Brian	United States	116	11	4
Quraishi, Farrukh	England	77	0	5
Radović, Branko	Yugoslavia	98	0	4
Raduka, Joe	Canada	91	0	5
Ragan, Randy	Canada	117	3	5
Ralbovsky, Steve	United States	117	3	6
Rausch, Wolfgang	West Germany	82	17	3
Redfern, Jim	England	65	13	3
Renery, Len	England	106	2	6
Renshaw, Mike	United States	141	20	8
Rensing, Gary	United States	164	0	9
Ressel, Peter	Netherlands	88	26	3
Reynolds, Craig	United States	63	3	5
Rigby, Bob	United States	217	0	12
Rijsbergen, Wim	Netherlands	86	2	5
Robb, David	Scotland	99	41	4
Roberts, Neill	South Africa	141	60	6
Roboostoff, Archie	United States	103	19	5
Roe, Peter	Canada	174	14	11
Rohmann, Nico	Luxembourg	76	5	3
Rojas, Manny	Chile	50	12	2
Romero, Julio César	Paraguay	99	34	4
Rongen, Thomas	Netherlands	138	10	6
Rosul, Roman	United States	52	17	3
Rote, Kyle	United States	142	43	7
Roth, Werner	United States	126	2	8
Rouse, Vic	Wales	61	0	5
Rowan, Barry	England	57	4	4
Rowan, Brian	Scotland	82	1	6
Rowlands, John	England	132	21	7
Roy, Willy	United States	99	41	6
Russell, Dale	Jamaica	68	10	3
Rutonjski, Vasa	Yugoslavia	52	0	2
Ryan, Greg	United States	70	2	5
Ryan, Jim	Scotland	97	21	4
Ryan, John	England	56	20	2
Rymarczuk, Andy	United States	53	3	3
Saccone, Ademar	Uruguay	56	31	4
Sammels, Jon	England	54	7	2
Sautter, Bill	United States	56	1	3
Savage, Bruce	United States	123	1	4
Scharmann, Johann	Austria	51	4	4
Schmetzer, Brian	United States	58	2	3
Schoenmaker, Lex	Netherlands	53	15	3
Scott, Delroy	Jamaica	69	2	4
Scullion, Stewart	Scotland	105	30	5
Seargeant, Steve	England	108	0	4
Seerey, Mike	United States	56	4	4
Šegota, Branko	Canada	147	73	6
Seissler, Manny	United States	129	47	8
Seninho	Portugal	105	25	7
Sewell, John	England	58	4	4
Sharp, Ronnie	Scotland	73	5	5
Short, Peter	England	174	20	11
Sibbald, Bobby	England	138	9	5
Siega, Jorge	United States	89	14	7
Silva, Ibraim	Portugal	108	16	5
Silvester, Peter	England	66	27	4
Simanton, Mark	United States	84	3	5
Simões, António	Portugal	66	6	4
Simpson, Peter	England	65	0	4
Skotarek, Alex	United States	134	2	7
Smethurst, Derek	South Africa	118	73	6
Smith, Bobby	United States	167	4	9
Sono, Jomo	South Africa	128	36	6
Spalding, Derek	United States	153	15	7
Spavin, Alan	England	68	6	6
St. Lot, Frantz	Haiti	63	1	4
Stahl, Mark	United States	89	0	6
Stars, Jurgen	West Germany	67	0	4
Steele, Jim	Scotland	78	2	4
Steffenhagen, Arno	West Germany	109	60	6
Stephens, Alan	England	64	1	3
Stepney, Alex	England	56	0	2
Stetler, Bob	United States	51	0	6
Stock, Jeff	United States	103	5	5
Stojanović, Mike	Canada	180	83	7
Stojanović, Mirko	Yugoslavia	81	0	4
Stokes, Bobby	England	98	17	4
Straub, Bill	United States	69	1	5
Stremlau, John	United States	92	2	5
Strenicer, Gene	Canada	159	9	8
Stride, David	England	96	8	4
Carl Strong	United States	128	5	7
Sühnholz, Wolfgang	West Germany	104	20	6
Šutevski, Damir	Yugoslavia	161	4	7
Suurbier, Wim	Netherlands	96	3	4
Sweeney, Mike	Canada	129	5	5
Sweetzer, Gordon	Canada	53	11	3
Szalay, Tibor	Hungary	90	25	4
Szefer, Stefan	United States	62	6	4
Tamindžić, Blagoje	Canada	58	0	4
Tatu	Brazil	60	24	3
Thomson, Bobby	England	139	4	6
Tinney, Phillip	Scotland	72	5	4
Tinnion, Brian	England	94	22	5
Tojačić, Ilija	Yugoslavia	57	3	2
Towers, Tony	England	97	9	4
Trevis, Derek	England	86	2	6
Trinklein, Gert	United States	56	2	2
Trost, Al	United States	147	35	7
Tukša, Val	Yugoslavia	55	7	3
Turner, Chris	England	105	12	4
Turner, Chris	Canada	58	0	6
Turner, Roy	United States	211	10	12
Twellman, Tim	United States	155	6	7
Usiyan, Thompson	Nigeria	69	22	3
Valentine, Carl	Canada	165	44	6
Van Beveren, Jan	Netherlands	110	0	4
Van der Beck, Perry	United States	117	11	7
van der Veen, Jan	Netherlands	127	16	5
van Veen, Leo	Netherlands	51	21	2
Vaninger, Denny	United States	91	25	7
Vargas, Bernard	Argentina	51	4	2
Vaughn, Danny	United States	94	6	5
Veee, Julie	United States	156	34	7
Verdi, Roger	England	103	1	7
Villa, Greg	United States	50	7	5
Viteskić, Sakib	Yugoslavia	61	8	3
Vogel, Gary	United States	63	0	4
Vranković, Mladen	Yugoslavia	56	1	2
Vujović, Dragan	Yugoslavia	66	22	3
Wall, Peter	England	92	3	4
Wallace, Barry	England	132	18	5
Want, Tony	England	118	0	5
Ward, Peter	England	86	47	3
Wark, Doug	United States	75	7	5
Webb, John	England	146	3	6
Webster, Adrian	England	111	3	6
Wegerle, Steve	South Africa	195	32	8
Welch, Art	Jamaica	187	45	12
Welch, Asher	Jamaica	57	8	3
Weller, Keith	England	136	22	6
Welsh, Kevin	United States	93	3	5
West, Alan	England	79	7	4
Whelan, Tony	England	160	8	6
Whittle, Maurice	England	80	16	3
Whymark, Trevor	England	57	25	2
Wieczorkowski, Gert	West Germany	124	8	5
Willey, Alan	England	238	129	9
Willner, Roy	United States	69	1	5
Willrich, Jean	United States	192	31	7
Wilson, Bruce	Canada	276	7	11
Winter, Mike	United States	57	0	4
Wit, Dennis	United States	161	4	9
Wolf, Ede	West Germany	62	5	3
Wood, Ian	England	55	5	3
Wooler, Alan	England	66	2	3
Wright, Ralph	England	74	6	4
Zec, Nino	Yugoslavia	121	26	6
Zequinha	Brazil	116	24	5

== Sources ==
- NASL Jerseys
