= 1977 Team Hawaii season =

Team Hawaii
1977 season
- Coach: Hubert Vogelsinger
- Stadium: Aloha Stadium
- NASL: Division: 4th Conference: 7th Overall: 12th
- NASL Playoffs: Did not qualify
- National Challenge Cup: Did not enter
- Average home league attendance: 4,543
| Home colors | Away colors |

The 1977 season was Team Hawaii's lone season in the North American Soccer League. Team Hawaii played at Aloha Stadium in Honolulu. The club was coached by Hubert Vogelsinger and then Charlie Mitchell as a player-manager mid-way through the campaign.

Following the 1977 season, due to general unpopularity and financial mismanagement, Team Hawaii relocated to Tulsa, Oklahoma and became the Tulsa Roughnecks.

== Squad ==
Last updated April 20, 2009. Note: Flags indicate national team as defined under FIFA eligibility rules; some limited exceptions apply. Players may hold more than one non-FIFA nationality.

| No. | Pos. | Nation | Player |
|---|---|---|---|
| 0 | GK | USA | Jimmy Joerg |
| 1 | GK | ENG | Peter Fox |
| 2 | DF | USA | Chris Carenza |
| 3 | DF | BRA | Ismael Moreira |
| 3 | DF | USA | Dave Stahl |
| 4 | DF | USA | Mark Stahl |
| 5 | DF | SCO | Charlie Mitchell |
| 6 | DF | GER | Peter Nover |
| 7 | DF | ENG | Tommy Taylor |
| 8 | DF | ENG | Keith Coleman |
| 11 | DF | GER | Axel Neumann |
| 13 | DF | USA | Ed Pitney |
| 21 | DF | CAN | Tim Hunter |

| No. | Pos. | Nation | Player |
|---|---|---|---|
| 9 | MF | SCO | Jim Henry |
| 10 | MF | POR | Diamantino Costa |
| 10 | MF | ENG | Ben Smith |
| 19 | MF | ENG | Pat Holland |
| 11 | MF | ENG | Chris Dangerfield |
| — | MF | ENG | Keith Robson |
| 14 | FW | CAN | Victor Kodelja |
| 15 | FW | USA | Dan Counce |
| 16 | FW | ENG | Brian Tinnon |
| 17 | FW | SKN | Bert Bowery |
| 18 | FW | CYP | Yilmaz Orhan |
| 20 | FW | IRL | Hilary Carlyle |

== Competitions ==
=== North American Soccer League ===
==== Match results ====
| April 8 | Team Hawaii | 0–0 | Seattle Sounders | Honolulu, HI |
| | | Report | | Stadium: Aloha Stadium; Attendance: 5,132 |

| April 13 | Team Hawaii | 1–2 | Cosmos | Honolulu, HI |
| | | Report | | Stadium: Aloha Stadium; Attendance: 12,877 |

| April 17 | Los Angeles Aztecs | 6–0 | Team Hawaii | Los Angeles, CA |
| | | Report | | Stadium: Los Angeles Memorial Coliseum; Attendance: 8,405 |

| April 23 | Las Vegas Quicksilvers | 0–1 | Team Hawaii | Las Vegas, NV |
| | | Report | | Stadium: Sam Boyd Stadium; Attendance: 5,183 |

| April 29 | Team Hawaii | 2–1 | Vancouver Whitecaps | Honolulu, HI |
| | | Report | | Stadium: Aloha Stadium; Attendance: 4,124 |

| May 6 | Portland Timbers | 1–1 | Team Hawaii | Portland, OR |
| | | Report | | Stadium: Civic Stadium; Attendance: 13,677 |

| May 8 | Minnesota Kicks | 3–0 | Team Hawaii | Bloomington, MN |
| | | Report | | Stadium: Metropolitan Stadium; Attendance: 35,996 |

| May 13 | Team Hawaii | 2–2 | Dallas Tornado | Honolulu, HI |
| | | Report | | Stadium: Aloha Stadium; Attendance: 3,147 |

| May 18 | Team Hawaii | 1–3 | Minnesota Kicks | Honolulu, HI |
| | | Report | | Stadium: Aloha Stadium; Attendance: 3,243 |
