= 1975 Portland Timbers season =

Portland Timbers
1975 season
- President: (United States) John Gilbertson
- Head coach: (Wales) Vic Crowe
- Stadium: Civic Stadium
- NASL: Division: 1st Playoffs: Soccer Bowl '75
- U.S. Open Cup: Did not enter
- Top goalscorer: League: (England) Peter Withe (16 goals); All: (England) Peter Withe (18 goals)
- Highest home attendance: League: 27,310 vs. SEA (Jul 26); All: 33,503 vs. STL (Aug 17)
- Lowest home attendance: 6,918 vs. ROC (May 27)
- Average home league attendance: League: 14,503; All: 17,274

The 1975 Portland Timbers season was the inaugural season for the Portland Timbers, an expansion team in the now-defunct North American Soccer League. In the Timbers first year of existence, the club won the Western Division title while amassing more points than any other club in the league. In the playoffs, the Timbers needed overtime to get past the Seattle Sounders and then defeated the St. Louis Stars en route to a berth in Soccer Bowl '75. Portland lost the championship game 2–0 to fellow expansion side Tampa Bay Rowdies at Spartan Stadium in San Jose, California on August 24.

== Squad ==
The 1975 squad

Note: Flags indicate national team as defined under FIFA eligibility rules; some limited exceptions apply. Players may hold more than one non-FIFA nationality.

No.	Pos.	Nation	Player
1	GK	ENG	Graham Brown
2	DF	ENG	Ray Martin
3	DF	ENG	Barrie Lynch
4	DF	USA	Mick Hoban
5	DF	ENG	Graham Day
6	MF	WAL	Brian Godfrey
7	MF	SCO	Tommy McLaren
8	MF	ENG	Barry Powell
9	FW	ENG	Peter Withe

No.	Pos.	Nation	Player
10	FW	JAM	Don Gardner
11	FW	NIR	Jimmy Kelly
12	FW	ENG	Willie Anderson
13	FW	ENG	Chris Dangerfield
14	FW	ENG	Tony Betts
16	FW	USA	Roger Goldingay
18	DF	CAN	Nick Nicolas
22	GK	CAN	Dave Landry

== North American Soccer League ==
=== Regular season ===
==== Western Division standings ====
Pos	Club	Pld	W	L	GF	GA	GD	Pts
1	Portland Timbers	22	16	6	43	27	+16	138
2	Seattle Sounders	22	15	7	42	28	+14	129
3	Los Angeles Aztecs	22	12	10	42	33	+9	107
4	Vancouver Whitecaps	22	11	11	38	28	+10	99
5	San Jose Earthquakes	22	8	14	37	48	−11	83

Pld = Matches played; W = Matches won; L = Matches lost; GF = Goals for; GA = Goals against; GD = Goal difference; Pts = Points

==== League results ====
Date	Opponent	Venue	Result	Attendance	Scorers
May 2, 1975	Seattle Sounders	H	0–1	6,913	
May 7, 1975	Toronto Metros-Croatia	H	1–0	8,500	Withe
May 11, 1975	Denver Dynamos	A	1–3	4,267	Withe
May 16, 1975	Vancouver Whitecaps	A	2–0	7,815	Powell, Betts
May 27, 1975	Rochester Lancers	H	3–2 (OT)	6,918	Godfrey, Withe, Anderson
May 30, 1975	Chicago Sting	H	2–0	9,526	Withe, Anderson
June 7, 1975	Vancouver Whitecaps	H	3–2 (OT)	11,335	Day, Godfrey, Betts
June 14, 1975	San Jose Earthquakes	A	1–2	17,889	Kelly
June 18, 1975	Dallas Tornado	H	3–0	14,688	Powell, Betts, Kelly
June 21, 1975	San Antonio Thunder	H	1–0 (OT)	14,080	Anderson
June 27, 1975	Los Angeles Aztecs	A	2–1 (OT)	6,609	Withe (2)
June 28, 1975	San Jose Earthquakes	A	2–1	18,883	Withe, Dangerfield
July 3, 1975	Vancouver Whitecaps	H	2–1	18,278	Betts, Dangerfield
July 8, 1975	Los Angeles Aztecs	H	4–1	17,765	Withe, Betts, Kelly, Dangerfield
July 11, 1975	Hartford Bicentennials	A	3–1	2,582	Day, Withe, Betts
July 12, 1975	Boston Minutemen	A	1–2	2,800	Dangerfield
July 16, 1975	New York Cosmos	A	2–1	13,423	Godfrey, Withe
July 19, 1975	St. Louis Stars	A	3–2 (OT)	6,902	Lynch, McLaren, Withe
July 26, 1975	Seattle Sounders	H	2–1	27,310	Withe (2)
July 29, 1975	San Jose Earthquakes	H	3–2	23,003	Withe (2), Powell
August 2, 1975	Seattle Sounders	A	2–3 (OT)	17,925	Powell, Withe
August 9, 1975	Los Angeles Aztecs	A	0–1	10,231	

=== Bracket ===
Quarter-finals
W1	Portland Timbers	2
W2	Seattle Sounders	1
C1	St. Louis Stars	1(5)
W3	Los Angeles Aztecs	1(4)
E2	Miami Toros	2
N1	Boston Minutemen	1
N2	Toronto Metros-Croatia	0
E1	Tampa Bay Rowdies	1

Semi-finals
W1	Portland Timbers	1
C1	St. Louis Stars	0
E2	Miami Toros	0
E1	Tampa Bay Rowdies	3

Soccer Bowl '75
W1	Portland Timbers	0
E1	Tampa Bay Rowdies	2

==== Playoff results ====
Date	Opponent	Venue	Result	Attendance	Scorers
August 12, 1975	Seattle Sounders	H	2–1 (OT)	31,523	Powell, Betts
August 17, 1975	St. Louis Stars	H	1–0	33,503	Withe
August 24, 1975	Tampa Bay Rowdies	N	0–2	17,009	
