= 1976 Portland Timbers season =

Portland Timbers
1976 season
- Owner: Oregon Soccer, Inc.
- Head coach: (Wales) Vic Crowe
- Stadium: Civic Stadium
- NASL: Division: 4th Playoffs: Did not qualify
- U.S. Open Cup: Did not enter
- Top goalscorer: (England) Tony Betts (6 goals)
- Highest home attendance: 32,247 vs. NYC (Jun 12)
- Lowest home attendance: 17,049 vs. SEA (Aug 7)
- Average home league attendance: 20,515

The 1976 Portland Timbers season was the second season for the Portland Timbers in the now-defunct North American Soccer League.

== Squad ==
The 1976 squad

Note: Flags indicate national team as defined under FIFA eligibility rules; some limited exceptions apply. Players may hold more than one non-FIFA nationality.

No.	Pos.	Nation	Player
2	DF	ENG	Ray Martin
4	DF	ENG	Mick Hoban
6	DF	USA	Chuck Carey
10	MF	USA	Hank Liotart
11	FW	NIR	Jimmy Kelly
13	FW	ENG	Chris Dangerfield
14	FW	ENG	Tony Betts
15	MF	SCO	Pat McMahon
16	FW	USA	Roger Goldingay
17	DF	ENG	Neil Rioch
18	DF	CAN	Nick Nicolas

No.	Pos.	Nation	Player
19	MF	SCO	Paul Hendrie
20	GK	ENG	Jim Cumbes
21	FW	ENG	Malcolm Smith
22	GK	CAN	Dave Landry
23	DF	ENG	Brian Tiler
24	FW	CAN	Ike MacKay
25	FW	SCO	John Smillie
27	FW	USA	Kit Zell
29	DF	USA	Chip Smallwood
32	FW	ENG	John Rogers
36	DF	CAN	Danny Lomas

== North American Soccer League ==
=== Pacific Conference, Western Division standings ===
Pos	Club	Pld	W	L	GF	GA	GD	Pts
1	Minnesota Kicks	24	15	9	54	33	+21	138
2	Seattle Sounders	24	14	10	40	31	+9	123
3	Vancouver Whitecaps	24	14	10	38	30	+8	120
4	Portland Timbers	24	8	16	23	41	−18	71
5	St. Louis Stars	24	5	19	28	57	−29	58

Pld = Matches played; W = Matches won; L = Matches lost; GF = Goals for; GA = Goals against; GD = Goal difference; Pts = Points

=== League results ===
Date	Opponent	Venue	Result	Attendance	Scorers
April 16, 1976	Vancouver Whitecaps	A	3*–2 (OT)	11,352	Betts, MacKay
April 25, 1976	Seattle Sounders	A	0–1 (OT)	24,983	
May 1, 1976	St. Louis Stars	H	3–2	22,147	McMahon, Betts, Dangerfield
May 8, 1976	Dallas Tornado	H	0–2	25,905	
May 14, 1976	San Diego Jaws	A	2–0	9,200	MacKay (2)
May 19, 1976	San Antonio Thunder	H	1–0	19,223	Betts
June 2, 1976	San Diego Jaws	H	1–2	18,337	Rioch
June 5, 1976	Los Angeles Aztecs	A	0–1	7,921	
June 12, 1976	New York Cosmos	H	0–3	32,247	
June 19, 1976	St. Louis Stars	A	1–3	5,900	Kelly
June 20, 1976	Miami Toros	A	1–3	3,299	Betts
June 25, 1976	San Jose Earthquakes	H	1–0	19,294	Rioch
June 30, 1976	Boston Minutemen	H	2–0	18,621	Rogers, Liotart
July 3, 1976	San Jose Earthquakes	A	0–3	20,807	
July 5, 1976	Los Angeles Aztecs	H	1–2	19,375	Smith
July 9, 1976	Rochester Lancers	A	0–1	7,797	
July 11, 1976	Toronto Metros-Croatia	A	1–2 (OT)	3,490	Dangerfield
July 18, 1976	Vancouver Whitecaps	H	2–1	17,456	Rioch, Betts
July 23, 1976	San Antonio Thunder	A	1–0	5,163	Smith
July 24, 1976	Dallas Tornado	A	0–3	14,206	
August 1, 1976	Minnesota Kicks	H	0–2	17,153	
August 4, 1976	Minnesota Kicks	A	1–2	25,509	Betts
August 7, 1976	Seattle Sounders	H	0–3	17,049	
August 14, 1976	Tampa Bay Rowdies	H	2–3	17,199	Smith, Rogers

* = Won coin-flip
