= Paul D'Agostino =

Paul D'Agostino may refer to:

- Paul D'Agostino (soccer)
- Paul D'Agostino (artist)
