= Ivan Lukačević =

Ivan Lukačević may refer to:

- Ivan Lukačević (footballer)
- Ivan Lukačević (soldier)
