= Ivica Grnja =

Croatian football manager (born 1949)

Personal information
- Date of birth: 26 April 1949 (age 77)
- Place of birth: Darda, PR Croatia, FPR Yugoslavia
- Position: Striker

Senior career*
| Years | Team | Apps | (Gls) |
| –1972 | Metalac | | |
| 1972–1980 | Osijek | | |
| 1976 | Toronto Metros-Croatia | 5 | (1) |
| 1979 | Tampa Bay Rowdies | 10 | (0) |
| Total | | 15+ | (1+) |

Managerial career
- 1991: Osijek
- 1993–1994: Osijek
- 2005: Croatia U21
- 2008–2011: Croatia U19
- * Club domestic league appearances and goals

Ivan "Ivica" Grnja, also known as John Grnja (born 26 April 1949) is a Croatian football manager and former professional player.

== Playing career ==
Grnja joined NK Osijek from Metalac Osijek in 1972, forming a formidable striking partnership with Ivan Lukačević and played in the North American Soccer League for the Toronto Metros-Croatia and the Tampa Bay Rowdies.

== Coaching career ==
Grnja has managed Croatian club side NK Osijek on two occasions – in 1991, and between 1993 and 1994.

Grnja also managed the Croatia under-21 side in 2005, and the under-19 side in 2008.
