= Reinhold Fanz =

German football player and manager

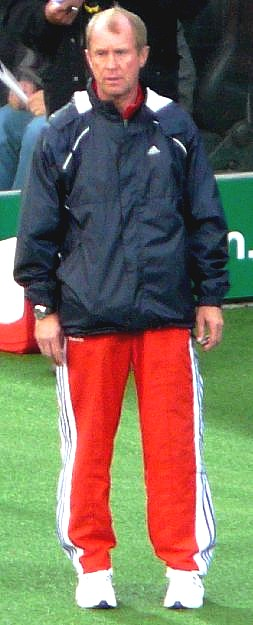
- Fanz in 2008

Personal information
- Date of birth: 16 January 1954 (age 72)
- Place of birth: Mannheim, West Germany
- Height: 1.80 m (5 ft 11 in)
- Position: Midfielder

Youth career
- TSV Amicitia Viernheim
- SV Sandhausen

Senior career*
Years	Team	Apps	(Gls)
1974–1975	VfR Heilbronn	35	(4)
1975–1977	Wuppertaler SV	61	(8)
1977–1979	Fortuna Düsseldorf	34	(2)
1979–1980	Freiburger FC	19	(1)
1980–1983	Karlsruher SC	36	(1)
1983–1984	SV Sandhausen		

Managerial career
- 1985–1987: FV 09 Weinheim
- 1996–1998: Hannover 96
- 1998–1999: Eintracht Frankfurt
- 1999–2001: Eintracht Braunschweig
- 2001: VfB Stuttgart II
- 2003–2004: VfB Stuttgart II
- 2004–2005: Karlsruher SC
- 2005–2006: Bonner SC
- 2008: Cuba
- 2013: Wuppertaler SV
- * Club domestic league appearances and goals

Reinhold Fanz (born 16 January 1954) is a German former professional footballer and former manager of the Cuba national team.

== Playing career ==
Fanz was born in Mannheim. He began his playing career at Amicitia Viernheim, before moving onto SV Sandhausen, playing in the third tier. In 1974, he joined VfR Heilbronn in the newly formed 2. Bundesliga South. The team's stay in this new division only lasted a single season though and, upon their relegation in 1975, Fanz left for 2. Bundesliga South club Wuppertaler SV. Here, he spent two seasons challenging for the promotion, but falling short (in fifth and third place, respectively).

Although Wuppertaler SV did not make the top flight, Fanz did as he was signed by Fortuna Düsseldorf in 1977. Fanz played his part as the team managed a top five finish in his first season, but his main achievement here was winning the 1979 DFB Cup as they defeated Hertha BSC 1–0.

However, he was not offered a new contract after this, and he found a new club in Freiburger FC of the 2. Bundesliga South in November 1979. After a six-month spell at this level, he returned to the Bundesliga with newly promoted Karlsruher SC. Fanz was a virtual ever-present in his debut year here as they consolidated in tenth place, and he remained first choice for the start of the following season. Disaster struck though just four games in, as he broke his fibula bone against Arminia Bielefeld.

This injury effectively ending his professional playing career, as he was unable to play another game for Karlsruher SC and eventually quit the club in 1983. He did manage to play a part in the 1983–84 season though for his former club SV Sandhausen in the Oberliga.

== Managerial career ==
After his retirement, Fanz entered coaching in 1985 at FV 09 Weinheim. After three seasons at the lower league club, he took up a position with the Hessen Football Association (HFV). He was in charge of the Hessen amateur/under-21 side at the DFB Amateur Cup. Fanz led the side to victory in 1992 and to the runners-up spot in 1989, 1991, 1993 and 1995.

In summer 1996, he took charge of Hannover 96, then of the Regionalliga Nord. He won this division at the first attempt, but the club failed to be promoted after losing a playoff (1–3 on aggregate) with the North-East division winners Energie Cottbus. The 1997–98 season saw Fanz and the club again dominate the division, scoring over 100 goals once more and topping the table. This time though they went a vital step further, as they won the promotion playoff against Tennis Borussia Berlin on penalties.

Fanz would not complete another season at Hannover 96 though, as he left at the halfway stage of their 2. Bundesliga campaign to join relegation-threatened Bundesliga team Eintracht Frankfurt on 21 December 1998. This move would prove much less successful for the coach as he was unable to turn things around, and managed just one win in nine games before being sacked on 19 April 1999.

After this disaster, he dropped back down the league for a new post with Eintracht Braunschweig of the Regionalliga in July 1999. The team had been on the verge of promotion for several years by this point, but Fanz was not the man to bring it, as he could only manage a third place at best in his first season. The underwhelming eighth place of the following season saw him fired at the season's close in May 2001.

Fanz took up a role in October 2001 as coach of VfB Stuttgart II, the amateur ranks of the Bundesliga side. He lasted only eight Regionalliga Sud games though, before club manager Rolf Rüssmann had a change of heart and relieved him of his duties. However, he was re-appointed to this position in June 2003 by coach Felix Magath, and he took the team to an 11th-place finish in the Regionalliga Süd. Magath's departure in the close season though, also spelled the end for Fanz at the club.

His next appointment was undoubtedly the most bizarre of his career. Fanz was hired during the winter break by his former club, 2. Bundesliga strugglers Karlsruher SC on 28 December 2004. However, the club's main sponsor Energie Baden-Württemberg (EnBW) let it be known that they did not approve of his hiring and threatened to withdraw their sponsorship.

This conflict was created by the fact that the sponsor's head was Utz Claassen, who had clashed with Fanz when he had been president of Hannover 96 while Fanz was coach. After Claassen had fired club manager Franz Gerber, Fanz gave a newspaper interview claiming Claassen lacked any understanding of football. This led to Claassen suing Fanz, which resulted in Fanz being prohibited from commenting on Claassen ever again. Both the fans and the club reacted negatively toward Claassen's actions and he was forced from office during the 1997–98 season. With the threat of removed sponsorship hanging over them, Karlsruher SC backed down and terminated Fanz's employment on 4 January 2005. Fanz had yet to manage the team in a single game.

After this fractious experience, Fanz found a more welcoming club in Bonner SC of the Oberliga for the 2004–05 season, signing a four-year contract. His first season here saw them finish as runners-up in the Oberliga Nordrhein, narrowing missing out on promotion to the Regionalliga. The next season started frustratingly though, as players salaries went unpaid, and the squad began to disintegrate. As the team slid into midtable, Fanz quit on the eve of their ninth game of the season, against Union Solingen.

In May 2013, Fanz returned to his former club Wuppertaler SV and was manager while the last matches of the current Regionalliga West season. He didn't get a new contract for the following season.
