= Trevor McCallum =

English-Canadian soccer player

Personal information
- Date of birth: February 26, 1964 (age 62)
- Place of birth: Birmingham, England
- Position: Defender

Youth career
- –1979: Aston Villa
- 1981: Mississauga United

Senior career*
Years	Team	Apps	(Gls)
1982	Toronto Italia		
1983–1984	Toronto Blizzard	6	(0)
1986	Toronto Italia		
1987–1989	Toronto Blizzard	65	(3)
1990	Kitchener Spirit	19	(0)
1991	Toronto Blizzard	0	(0)
1991	Hamilton Steelers	7	(0)

International career
1983–1988	Canada	18	(0)
Medal record
Representing Canada
Men's Association football
CONCACAF Championship
Winner	1985 North America
- * Club domestic league appearances and goals

Trevor McCallum (born February 26, 1964) is a former English-Canadian soccer defender who played professionally in the North American Soccer League and earned eighteen caps with the Canada men's national soccer team.

== Career ==
McCallum played with Aston Villa's youth team, and in 1979 he moved to Canada where he played with Mississauga United in 1981. In 1982, he played in the National Soccer League with Toronto Italia. In 1983, he played in the North American Soccer League with Toronto Blizzard in the last two seasons of the league. In 1986, he returned to the National Soccer League and played with former team Toronto Italia. The following season he played in the Canadian Soccer League with the Edmonton Brick Men, but was traded to the Blizzard midway through the season. During his time in the Canadian Soccer League he was selected to the 1989 All-Star team.

In 1990, he was originally transferred to Edmonton, but shortly after was traded to Kitchener Spirit. In 1991, he returned to play with the Toronto Blizzard.

== International career ==
McCallum made his debut for the Canadian national soccer team on December 6, 1983 against Mexico in a friendly match. In total he played 18 international matches for the national team between 1983 and 1988.

== Personal life ==
His nephew Gavin McCallum is also a footballer who played for the Canadian national soccer team.

== Honours ==
Canada

- CONCACAF Championship: 1985
