= Ian MacHattie =

Scottish footballer (born 1952)

Personal information
- Date of birth: 1952 (age 73–74)
- Place of birth: Tanganyika Territory
- Height: 1.78 m (5 ft 10 in)
- Position: Forward

Youth career
- Creetown
- Ewart
- Dumfries and Galloway
- Creetown
- Tarff Rovers
- Crystal Palace

Senior career*
Years	Team	Apps	(Gls)
1969–1972	Crystal Palace	0	(0)
1971–1972	→ Toronto Metros (loan)	31	(10)
1972	Wimbledon (trial)	0	(0)
- Dover
- Ramsgate
- * Club domestic league appearances and goals

Ian MacHattie (born 1952), sometimes spelt Ian McHattie, is a Scottish former footballer and firefighter. As a footballer, he played as a forward.

== Early life ==
MacHattie was born in Tanganyika in 1952, as his father worked as the head forester for the colonial government. When he was seven years old, he and his family left Tanganyika due to the Mau Mau rebellion, and moved to Strathpeffer in Scotland. He spent six months there, before moving to Creetown when his father got a job in the town, before moving to Palnure shortly after.

He played youth football while in Creetown, and later played youth football for Ewart, Dumfries and Galloway, Creetown, and Tarff Rovers, before he was scouted by Crystal Palace.

== Football career ==
In October 1969, MacHattie joined Crystal Palace, where he primarily played for the club's youth and reserve teams. He spent two seasons at the club, making only one first-team appearance, during Arthur Rowe's testimonial match. During an FA Youth Cup match against Millwall, he injured his ankle in a tackle, before later discovering he had broken his foot after an x-ray scan.

While still in rehab from the injury, Graham Leggatt signed him on loan for newly-formed North American Soccer League side Toronto Metros in March 1971. In Toronto, he scored 10 goals in 31 matches, and was included in the 1971 NASL all-star team. During a friendly match against Santos in 1972, he was injured by Pelé after the Brazilian stepped on the foot he had previously injured.

After MacHattie returned to Crystal Palace, the club chose no to re-sign him. That summer, he went on an extended trial with English club Wimbledon, after the club was recommended him by captain John Loughlan. He only made one appearance for the club while on trial, a 2–0 defeat against Dagenham in the London Challenge Cup. Afterwards, he played amateur football for the likes of Dover and Ramsgate.

== Firefighting career ==
Following his retirement, MacHattie worked as a stockbroker in Surrey for six months. During that time, he saw an advertisement for the Surrey Fire and Rescue Service, which he joined in 1975. He spent 15 years as a firefighter, before being medically discharged in 1990, due to asthma that had been caused by non work-related stress.

== Personal life ==
Growing up, MacHattie spoke fluent Swahili. After being discharged as a firefighter, he worked as a gas and wood burner salesman across the United Kingdom for 25 years.
