= John Paskin =

South African soccer player

Personal information
- Full name: William John Paskin
- Date of birth: 1 February 1962 (age 64)
- Place of birth: Cape Town, South Africa
- Height: 6 ft 1 in (1.85 m)
- Position: Striker

Senior career*
Years	Team	Apps	(Gls)
1980–1983	Hellenic		
1984	Toronto Blizzard	16	(10)
1984–1985	South China AA	16	(10)
1985–1986	Seiko SA		
1986–1988	K.V. Kortrijk	11	(0)
1988–1989	West Bromwich Albion	25	(5)
1989–1992	Wolverhampton Wanderers	34	(3)
1991	→ Stockport County (loan)	5	(1)
1991–1992	→ Birmingham City (loan)	10	(3)
1992	→ Shrewsbury Town (loan)	1	(0)
1992–1994	Wrexham	51	(11)
1994–1996	Bury	38	(8)
1996	Cape Town Spurs	2	(0)
1996	Fredrikstad FK	6	(3)
1997–1998	Hellenic		
- * Club domestic league appearances and goals

William John Paskin (born 1 February 1962) is a South African former professional footballer who made 164 appearances in the Football League playing for West Bromwich Albion, Wolverhampton Wanderers, Stockport County, Birmingham City, Shrewsbury Town, Wrexham and Bury. He also played in South Africa, in the North American Soccer League, in Hong Kong, Belgium and Norway. He played as a forward.

== Career ==
Paskin was born in Cape Town. He began his football career domestically with Hellenic, then spent the 1984 North American Soccer League season with Toronto Blizzard. He played 16 games and scored 10 goals, including scoring in the second game of the three-game Championship Game series: Toronto lost that game 3–2 and lost the series 2–0 to the Chicago Sting. Paskin's next port of call was Hong Kong, where he played for South China and Seiko, and represented Hong Kong against the South Korean national team in the 1986 Chinese New Year Cup. In the 1986–87 Belgian First Division season, he played for K.V. Kortrijk.

Paskin made his Football League debut for West Bromwich Albion in the 1988–89 season, and played 25 league games before moving on to Wolverhampton Wanderers for a fee of £75,000 at the end of the season. He scored only three goals in his 34 league appearances for the club, and spent periods on loan at Stockport County, Birmingham City and Shrewsbury Town, before joining Wrexham on a free transfer in February 1992. Paskin scored 14 goals from 60 games in all competitions for the club, and in July 1994 signed for Bury on a free transfer. He played quite frequently in his first season at Bury, though more often as a substitute, then sustained an injury which kept him out for much of the 1995–96 season. By the end of that season he was anxious to leave the club, and was released in May 1996.

He spent a few weeks with Fredrikstad FK in the Norwegian Second Division before finishing his career in his native South Africa with his former club Hellenic.
