= Fabian Gerber =

German footballer

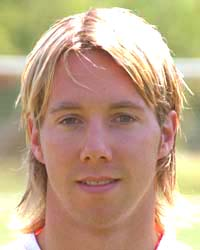
- Gerber in 2006

Personal information
- Date of birth: 28 November 1979 (age 46)
- Place of birth: Munich, West Germany
- Height: 1.83 m (6 ft 0 in)
- Position: Midfielder

Youth career
- –1997: TuS Celle FC

Senior career*
Years	Team	Apps	(Gls)
1997–1999	Hannover 96	15	(1)
1999–2001	FC St. Pauli	20	(2)
2001–2002	SC Freiburg	13	(1)
2003	FC St. Pauli	17	(8)
2004–2007	Mainz 05	107	(11)
2004–2007	Mainz 05 II	1	(0)
2007–2009	OFI	36	(0)
2009–2013	FC Ingolstadt	54	(9)
Total		263	(32)

International career
2005	Germany Team 2006	1	(1)

Managerial career
- 2016: BSV Schwarz-Weiß Rehden
- 2017–2018: 1. FSV Mainz 05 II (assistant)
- 2019–2020: 1. FC Nürnberg (assistant)
- 2022–: FC Rot-Weiß Erfurt
- * Club domestic league appearances and goals

Fabian Gerber (born 28 November 1979) is a German former professional footballer who played as a midfielder, and current coach. He is the son of Franz Gerber, also a former football player, and manager.
