= Palnure =

Village in Dumfries and Galloway, Scotland

Coordinates: 54°56′N 4°25′W

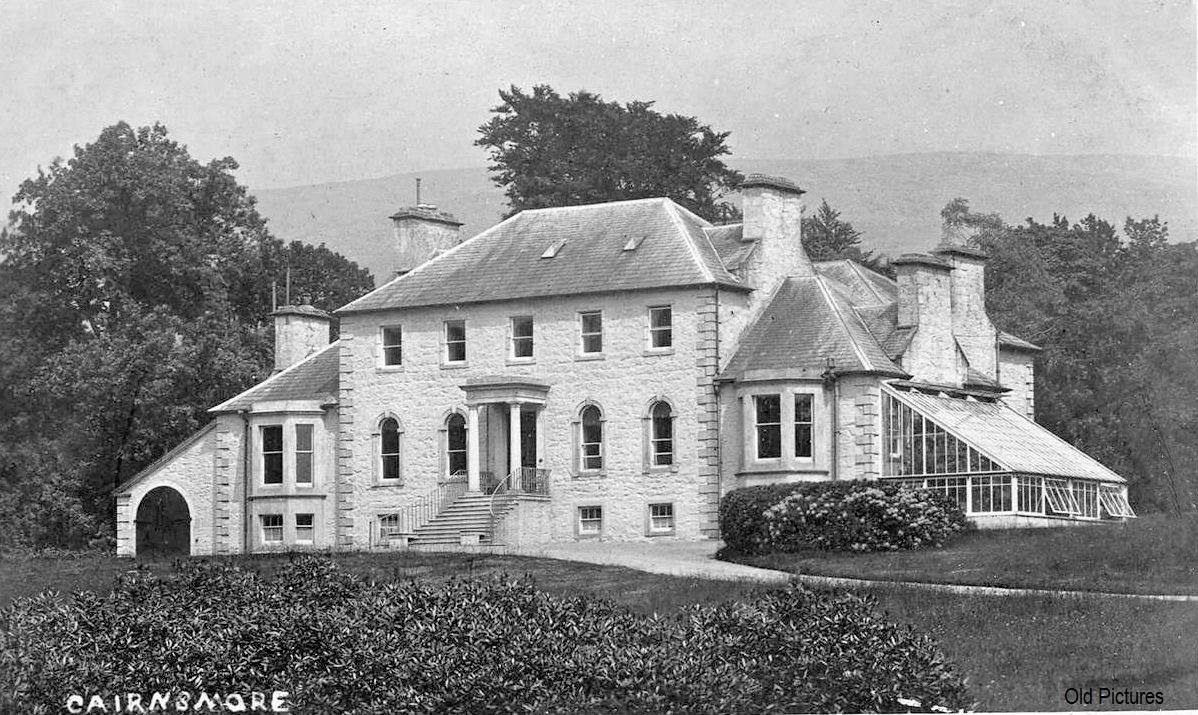
Cairnsmore House, built 1740.

Palnure (Scottish Gaelic: Poll an Iùbhair) is a small village in the historical county of Kirkcudbrightshire in Dumfries and Galloway, Scotland, on the Palnure Burn, just outside Newton Stewart.

Until 1951 Palnure had a railway station on the Portpatrick and Wigtownshire Joint Railway that was closed to all traffic in 1965.

== Notable residents ==
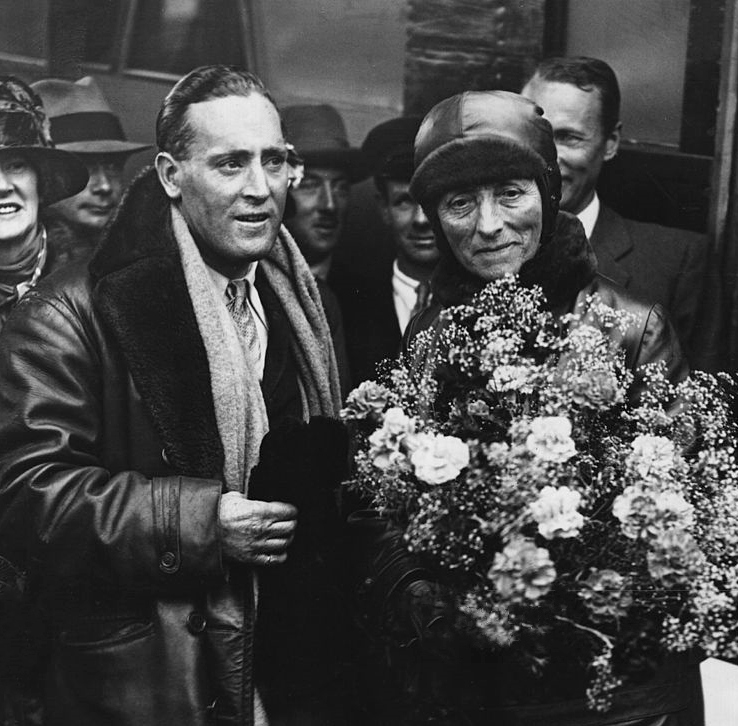
"The Flying Duchess " and her co-pilot CD Barnard in 1929.

Cairnsmore was the birthplace of Hastings Russell, 12th Duke of Bedford son of Herbrand Russell, 11th Duke of Bedford and his wife Mary Du Caurroy Tribe, DBE, RRC, FLS, 'The Flying Duchess '. He was born in a derelict shepherd's cottage on the moors on 21 December 1888, his mother Lady Herbrand Russell having gone into labour while walking on the moors with her husband. He was noted for both his career as a naturalist and for his involvement in far-right politics.

Scottish footballer Ian MacHattie, who was born in Tanganyika, grew up in Palnure.
