= Willie McVie =

Scottish footballer

Personal information
- Full name: William McVie
- Date of birth: 7 August 1949 (age 77)
- Place of birth: Glasgow, Scotland
- Height: 1.85 m (6 ft 1 in)
- Position: Centre half

Senior career*
Years	Team	Apps	(Gls)
1968–1975	Clyde	110	(10)
1975–1979	Motherwell	87	(2)
1979–1980	Toronto Blizzard	28	(0)
1980–1981	Hearts	12	(0)
1981–	Blantyre Victoria		
Total		237	(12)

International career
1976	Scotland U23	2	(0)
- * Club domestic league appearances and goals

Willie McVie (born 7 August 1948 in Glasgow) is a Scottish former footballer.

McVie began his career with Clyde, spending 7 years with the Shawfield club before joining Motherwell. He went on to have spells with Toronto Blizzard in Canada and Heart of Midlothian, before retiring in 1981. He now is a publican in Larkhall.
