= Charlie Falzon =

Canadian retired soccer player

Personal information
- Date of birth: November 14, 1961 (age 64)
- Place of birth: Toronto, Ontario, Canada
- Positions: Defender; midfielder

Senior career*
Years	Team	Apps	(Gls)
1981–1982	Montreal Manic (indoor)	4	(1)
1982	Montreal Manic	5	(0)
1983–1984	Toronto Blizzard	10	(1)
1985–1986	Pittsburgh Spirit (indoor)	39	(4)
1986–1987	St. Louis Steamers (indoor)	43	(16)
1987	Toronto Blizzard	6	(0)
1987	North York Rockets	10	(1)
1987–1988	Tacoma Stars (indoor)	27	(5)
1988–1989	Toronto Blizzard	35	(2)

International career
1983–1989	Canada	9	(0)
- * Club domestic league appearances and goals

Charlie Falzon is a Canadian retired soccer player who spent time in the North American Soccer League and Major Indoor Soccer League. He also earned nine caps with the Canadian national soccer team between 1983 and 1989. Charlie is currently an advanced care paramedic working for Toronto EMS.

== Professional ==
A midfielder, Falzon played the last 3 seasons of the NASL before the league's demise - the 1982 with the Montreal Manic and 1983 and '84 with the Toronto Blizzard. In September 1985, Falzon signed as a free agent with the Pittsburgh Spirit of the original Major Indoor Soccer League. In 1986, he moved to the St. Louis Steamers. In December 1987, the Steamers traded Falzon to the Tacoma Stars in exchange for Godfrey Ingram and cash. Falzon also played for the North York Rockets and Toronto Blizzard in the Canadian Soccer League.

== National team ==
Falzon earned nine caps with the Canadian national soccer team. He played three times in 1983 and another three gamed in 1984. After two games in 1988, he finished his career with a single game against Belgium in 1989. He scored no goals with the national team.

== Coach ==
Falzon has been involved with the Ontario Soccer Association, being an assistant coach of the OSA's U-14 boys team. Falzon is also involved as a coach with a girls select soccer team at the North Mississauga Soccer Club.
