= Graham Hatley =

Scottish-born Canadian soccer player

Personal information
- Date of birth: 26 October 1960 (age 66)
- Place of birth: Alloa, Scotland
- Position: Midfielder

Senior career*
| Years | Team | Apps | (Gls) |
| 1979–1981 | Toronto Blizzard | 24 | (0) |
| 1980 | Toronto Blizzard (indoor) | 18 | (13) |
| 1982 | Hamilton Steelers | | |

International career
| 1978–1979 | Canada U20 | 8 | (0) |
| 1979 | Canada U23 | 4 | (0) |
- * Club domestic league appearances and goals

Graham Hatley (born October 26, 1960) is a Scottish-born Canadian former soccer player who played in the North American Soccer League.

== Career ==
Hatley played in the North American Soccer League in 1979 with the Toronto Blizzard. He spent four seasons with the club and played with the indoor team in 1980. On November 4, 1980, he was released by the Toronto Blizzard. In 1982, he played in the National Soccer League with Hamilton Steelers where he assisted in securing the NSL Championship.

== International career ==
Hatley made his debut for the Canada men's national under-20 soccer team on November 26, 1978 against the Dominican Republic at the 1978 CONCACAF U-20 Tournament. He also represented Canada at the 1979 FIFA World Youth Championship. On April 5, 1979, he made his debut for the Canada men's national under-23 soccer team against the United States in a qualification match for the 1979 Pan American Games.
