= Danny Vaughn (soccer) =

American soccer player (born 1956)

Personal information
- Date of birth: August 7, 1956 (age 70)
- Place of birth: Tacoma, Washington, United States
- Positions: Forward; defender

Senior career*
Years	Team	Apps	(Gls)
1978–1979	Detroit Express	24	(4)
1979–1980	Detroit Express (indoor)	3	(1)
1980	Memphis Rogues	18	(1)
1981	Calgary Boomers	31	(0)
1981–1982	Jacksonville Tea Men (indoor)		
1982	Jacksonville Tea Men	21	(1)
- * Club domestic league appearances and goals

Danny Vaughn (born August 7, 1956) is an American former professional soccer player who played in the North American Soccer League.

== Career ==
In 1978, Vaughn signed with the Detroit Express of the North American Soccer League. He remained with the Express through the 1979-1980 indoor season before moving to the Memphis Rogues for the 1980 outdoor season. In 1981, the team came under new ownership which moved it to Calgary, Alberta, Canada and renamed it the Boomers. In the fall of 1981, Vaughn signed as a free agent with the Jacksonville Tea Men.

He is a member of the Tacoma-Pierce County Sports Hall of Fame.
