= Con Davey =

Northern Ireland footballer

Personal information
- Full name: Conleth Davey
- Place of birth: Newry, Northern Ireland
- Position: Centre forward

Senior career*
Years	Team	Apps	(Gls)
- Coleraine
–1973	Glenavon		
1973–1975	Dundalk	54	(5)
1974	→ Toronto Metros (loan)	11	(0)
1976–1981	Glenavon		(8)

International career
1973	Northern Ireland Amateurs	1	(0)
- * Club domestic league appearances and goals

Conleth Davey is a Northern Irish retired footballer who played in the North American Soccer League for Toronto Metros as a centre forward.

== Personal life ==
Davey's brothers Pat and Terry and son Hugh all became footballers.

== Career statistics ==
Appearances and goals by club, season and competition
Club	Season	League			National Cup		Total	
Club	Season	Division	Apps	Goals	Apps	Goals	Apps	Goals
Toronto Metros	1974	North American Soccer League	11	0	—		11	0
Career total			11	0	0	0	11	0

== Honours ==
Dundalk

- League of Ireland: 1975–76
- Leinster Cup: 1973–74
