= Bobby Prentice =

Scottish footballer (1953–2019)

Personal information
- Date of birth: 27 September 1953
- Place of birth: Douglas Water, Scotland
- Date of death: 16 September 2019 (aged 65)
- Place of death: Scotland
- Position: Outside left

Youth career
- Newtongrange Star
- 1971–1973: Celtic

Senior career*
Years	Team	Apps	(Gls)
1973–1979	Heart of Midlothian	145	(12)
1979–1981	Toronto Blizzard	29	(0)
1980–81	Toronto Blizzard (indoor)	18	(28)
1981–1983	Baltimore Blast (indoor)	59	(24)
1984	Buffalo Stallions (indoor)	21	(3)

International career
1974	Scottish League XI	1	(0)
- * Club domestic league appearances and goals

Bobby Prentice (27 September 1953 – 16 September 2019) was a Scottish professional footballer who played as an outside left.

Prentice started his senior career with Celtic, but did not make a league appearance for the club. He joined Hearts on 18 August 1973. Bobby made 209 appearances for Hearts, his last on 28 April 1979. He scored 20 goals for the club and was noted as a fast outside left. Prentice then played for Toronto Blizzard for three seasons from 1979 to 1981 (0 goals in 29 appearances), plus one indoor season (28 goals in 18 appearances). After playing indoor football for Baltimore Blast from 1981 to 1983 (24 goals in 59 appearances) and Buffalo Stallions in 1984 (3 goals in 21 appearances), Prentice returned to Scotland in 1984 and lived in Dalkeith.

He played for Scotland under-23s on four occasions, scoring in a match against Denmark.
