= Franz Gerber =

German footballer and manager

Personal information
- Date of birth: 27 November 1953 (age 72)
- Place of birth: Munich, West Germany
- Height: 1.77 m (5 ft 10 in)
- Position: Striker

Youth career
- 1963–1964: TSV Eching
- 1964–1971: Bayern Munich

Senior career*
Years	Team	Apps	(Gls)
1971–1972	Bayern Munich	1	(0)
1972–1974	FC St. Pauli	55	(51)
1974–1976	Wuppertaler SV	62	(31)
1976–1978	FC St. Pauli	70	(43)
1978–1980	1860 Munich	45	(21)
1980–1981	ESV Ingolstadt	36	(23)
1981	Calgary Boomers	25	(20)
1982	Tulsa Roughnecks	27	(11)
1983	Tampa Bay Rowdies	24	(4)
1984–1986	Hannover 96	55	(12)
1986–1988	FC St. Pauli	35	(15)
Total		435	(231)

Managerial career
- 1989–1996: TuS Celle
- 1999: Hannover 96
- 2003–2004: FC St. Pauli
- 2006–2007: Goslarer SC 08
- 2007–2009: Madagascar
- 2009–: Jahn Regensburg (General manager)
- 2012–2013: Jahn Regensburg (Caretaker)
- * Club domestic league appearances and goals

Franz Gerber (born 27 November 1953) is a German former professional footballer.

== Playing career ==
Gerber was born in Munich. He spent most of his teenage years playing in the youth ranks at Bayern Munich, until finally making the senior squad in 1971–72, aged just 17. He made his debut on 15 April 1972 as a substitute in a 3–1 victory over Hannover 96 during the club's championship winning campaign. Despite this breakthrough, this would be Gerber's sole appearance for the legendary team as he moved onto FC St. Pauli of the (then) second flight Regionalliga North during the summer.

Here, he began the first of three different spells at the club, making an immediate impact as the team finished as winners of the division in his first season. However, Gerber was denied a rapid return to the top flight as FC St. Pauli narrowly missed promotion after losing out in the playoff group to Fortuna Köln. The following season Gerber again helped fire the club to this stage, but once more they came unstuck in the final group phase. Although the club hadn't progressed, Gerber certainly had as he staked his claim as one of the best young goalscorers in Germany with his astonishing haul of 51 goals in 55 games.

This was enough to tempt Bundesliga club Wuppertaler SV to sign him in Summer 1974. Gerber settled well and was easily the club's top goalscorer with 12 goals in his debut season there. However, this was insufficient to retain the club's top flight status and they dropped down to the recently formed 2. Bundesliga North. Gerber again proved himself the club's leading marksman with 19 goals in 32 games, but they could only manage fifth place, prompting the striker to leave.

In 1976, he returned for a second spell at FC St. Pauli, still fighting for promotion to the Bundesliga. With Gerber restored to their strike force, the club finally broke through into the top level as they won the division. Gerber was instrumental, scoring 27 goals, enough to land him the top goalscorer award for the division. Their stay at this class would last just the one season though, as they finished bottom, but Gerber proved himself equipped for this standard with 16 goals.

Nonetheless, he had to return to the second tier, though not with FC St. Pauli, as he returned south to his home city with TSV 1860 München in 1978. Once more, Gerber would fire a club to the Bundesliga as his 19-goal tally pushed the side to the championship. The following season would prove an uncharacteristically poor one for the striker as he lost form scoring just twice in his opening 10 games and being cast to the sidelines with the arrival of new coach Carl-Heinz Rühl.

After this setback, Gerber left the club for fellow Bavarians ESV Ingolstadt of the 2. Bundesliga South. His scoring touch duly returned and he contributed 23 goals in 36 games. However the team could only manage 16th place, which due to the criteria set in place for the following year's modification of the division into one from its two regions, meant relegation for the club.

Gerber would not make the drop into the Oberliga though, as he headed for a new challenge in Canada, joining the Calgary Boomers of the North American Soccer League. The club played only one season before folding, which saw Gerber move on to the Tulsa Roughnecks. In 1983, he joined the Tampa Bay Rowdies, after they beat out the Calgary Mustangs in a bidding war for his services. He played 76 games in total in the league, scoring 35 goals. When the league collapsed into bankruptcy after the 1984 season, the German returned to his homeland with 2. Bundesliga Hannover 96.

Now in his 30s, Gerber could still cut the mustard at this level as his 12 goals helped the club win promotion in the 1984–85 season, his third promotion from the division. The following season was a much harder experience as the club fell back down and Gerber, for the first time in his professional career, failed to register a single goal for the campaign (from 18 games).

After this lean season, Gerber headed back for a final stint at FC St. Pauli. His finishing returned and he managed 15 goals, enough to take the club to third place and another potential promotion. They faced FC 08 Homburg of the Bundesliga in a playoff for the final spot in the top flight, but narrowly lost 4–3 on aggregate. Gerber's hopes of another successful promotion campaign were immediately shattered in the 1987–88 season as he was badly injured in the opening game at Union Solingen. This proved enough to end his career, aged 34.

His tally of 115 goals at 2. Bundesliga level puts him as the 8th most successful marksmen in the division's history. Over his three spells at FC St. Pauli, he became the club's most successful goalscorer since the formation of the Bundesliga.

== Managerial career ==
Since his playing retirement, Gerber has remained in the game in many capacities. In 1989, he began as manager of TuS Celle of the Verbandsliga Niedersachsen. Gerber immediately tasted success, as the club won this division and climbed into the Oberliga North. During this time he was also coach of the youth ranks.

In 1996, he was appointed club manager of Hannover 96. This post lasted until August 1997, as he was fired by new club president Utz Claassen, but reinstated just weeks later after angry fan demonstrations. He remained in this role until 1999, when he became coach of the side after the firing of Reinhold Fanz in the winter break. Gerber lifted the team up the 2. Bundesliga table into genuine promotion challengers, but they fell just short, one point off third.

Gerber left the club after this near-miss, ending up at BV Cloppenburg in January 2000 as club manager. He lasted 12 months in this position before taking up an advisory role with VfB Oldenburg in January 2001. This left this in the summer to return to Hannover 96 as sporting director but had left by Christmas. In April 2002, he returned to his advisory role at VfB Oldenburg.

However, he would stay long as the lure of the club manager's role at his old club FC St. Pauli proved too strong in July 2002. After the firing of coach Joachim Philipkowski in December 2002, Gerber moved into the coach's role. The club were mired in the relegation zone of 2. Bundesliga at the halfway stage, and despite adding some wins – and his son Fabian to the team – he could not prevent the drop.

He started the 2003–04 Regionalliga North campaign still as coach but by the run-in the club were in danger of slipping down another level for the third year running. Gerber was fired on 28 March 2004, after the club had lost 0–1 at Rot-Weiss Essen.

In December 2006, he became manager at Verbandsliga Niedersachsen East side Goslarer SC 08.

In 2007, he was appointed manager of Madagascar with a view to guiding them through the 2010 World Cup qualifiers. Madagascar defeated Comoros 6–2 and 4–0 to secure a place in the first group stage.

Since September 2009, Gerber was (with a two-month break) the general manager of Jahn Regensburg. On 4 November 2012, he took over the job as interim manager of SSV Jahn Regensburg after the previous manager Oscar Corrochano was sacked due to luck of success. He stepped down when Franciszek Smuda was hired as new manager on 2 January 2013. When Regensburg was relegated from the 2. Bundesliga, Gerber was sacked at the end of the 2012–13 season.

== Personal life ==
Gerber is the father of Fabian Gerber, a longtime 2. Bundesliga player.
