= Paul D'Agostino (soccer) =

Italian footballer

Personal information
- Date of birth: July 13, 1956 (age 70)
- Place of birth: Silvi, Italy
- Position: Midfielder

Senior career*
Years	Team	Apps	(Gls)
1972–1975	Toronto Italia		
1975	York University		
1976	Toronto Metros-Croatia	12	(0)
1978	Memphis Rogues	19	(0)
1979	York University		
1980	Memphis Rogues	25	(0)
1980–1981	Calgary Boomers (indoor)	18	(4)
1981	Calgary Boomers	17	(0)
- * Club domestic league appearances and goals

Paul D'Agostino (born July 13, 1956) is a former midfielder or defender who played professionally for several teams in the North American Soccer League (NASL).

He played in the National Soccer League (NSL) in 1972 with Toronto Italia. In 1981, he served as captain of the Calgary Boomers. After his stint with Calgary he returned to the NSL to play with Toronto Panhellenic.
