= Phil Davis (footballer, born 1944) =

English footballer

Personal information
- Date of birth: 1944
- Place of birth: Sheffield, England
- Date of death: 25 December 1997 (aged 52–53)
- Place of death: Rochester, New York, United States
- Position: Defender

Senior career*
Years	Team	Apps	(Gls)
1967	Hamilton Primos		
1970–1971	Rochester Lancers	22	(0)
1971	Toronto Metros	18	(0)
1973	Montreal Olympique	19	(1)
1974	Rochester Lancers	5	(0)
1975	Hartford Bicentennials	3	(0)
1976	Boston Minutemen	11	(0)
1977	Cleveland Cobras		
- * Club domestic league appearances and goals

Phil Davis was an English professional footballer who played as a defender. He spent six seasons in the North American Soccer League and at least one in the second American Soccer League. He has three children, Todd Davis, Keith Davis and Meredith Davis Gorman, a reporter for the New England Sports Network.

In 1967, after playing with the reserves he joined the Hamilton Primos' first team to play in the National Soccer League.

== Personal life ==
He died on 25 December 1997.
