= Renard Moxam =

Caymanian footballer

Personal information
- Date of birth: 1955 or 1956 (age 70)
- Place of birth: George Town, Cayman Islands
- Position: Midfielder

Senior career*
Years	Team	Apps	(Gls)
- B-Rite Stars
- Benfica
- Interpol
–1979	Cayman National Bank		
1979	Toronto Blizzard	9	
1979–1980s	Cayman National Bank		

International career
1969–1980s	Cayman Islands		
- * Club domestic league appearances and goals

Renard Moxam (born 1955 or 1956) is a Caymanian football administrator and former footballer who played as a midfielder.

== Playing career ==
Moxam began his career in the Cayman Islands Premier League with B-Rite Stars, where he played for four years, before joining Benfica when the team folded. At the age of 19, he travelled to Miami for a two-week trial with North American Soccer League side Miami Toros, although was unable to join due to a foreign player quota. After Benfica folded, he joined Interpol, before joining Cayman National Bank after Interpol folded as well.

In 1979, Moxam was invited to a trial with the Toronto Blizzard. With the help of Cayman Airways, he travelled to Tampa Bay, where the Blizard were preparing to play the Tampa Bay Rowdies. That year, he signed for the club, becoming the first professional footballer from the Cayman Islands. He only made nine appearances for the club, before returning to the Cayman Islands.

Internationally, Moxam played for the Cayman Islands national team, making his debut at the age of 13, and was still playing for the national team by 1982. In 2022, the IFFHS included Moxam in their all-time Cayman Islands dream team.

== Administrative career ==
In April 2014, Moxam was appointed as the Cayman Islands' national team director, which had been vacant since Carl Brown's contract expired in 2011. Prior to his appointment, he coached youth football for three decades, and had served on the board of Caymanian side Academy SC.

In 2015, he intended to run for the presidency of the Cayman Islands Football Association after Jeffrey Webb was suspended following that year's FIFA corruption scandal. However, he, alongside another person intending to run, were told their nomination papers were not in order, resulting in then-vice-president Bruce Blake being elected unopposed. This prompted an investigation by both the Cayman Islands’ Anti Corruption Commission and the country's government, who suspended funding to the federation. He later ran for the Cayman Islands Football Association presidency in 2017.

== Personal life ==
Moxam is married, and has three children, with two of them being named after Italian footballer Luigi Riva and Dutch footballer Johan Cruyff. He also has six siblings, including three brothers and three sisters.

In 1978, Moxam founded a sports store on the Cayman Islands called Renard’s Sports World, alongside banker John Rea, which eventually became one of the largest retailers on the Cayman Islands. In 1986, it was renamed to Island Clothing Company, before being renamed again to Island Companies in 1993. In 2013, Moxam relinquished his ownership of the company.

== External link ==
- Renard Moxam at nasljerseys.com
