= Brian Rowan =

Scottish footballer (1948–2021)

Personal information
- Full name: Brian Rowan
- Date of birth: 28 June 1948
- Place of birth: Glasgow, Scotland
- Date of death: 22 December 2021 (aged 73)
- Position: Full back

Senior career*
Years	Team	Apps	(Gls)
- Baillieston Juniors
1969–1971	Aston Villa	1	(0)
1971	Toronto Metros	23	(0)
1971–1972	Watford	12	(0)
1972	Toronto Metros	9	(0)
1972–1973	Morton	2	(0)
1973–1975	Toronto Metros	36	(1)
1975–1976	New York Cosmos	14	(0)
Total		97	(1)
- * Club domestic league appearances and goals

Brian Rowan (28 June 1948 – 22 December 2021) was a Scottish professional footballer who played as a full back. Active in Scotland, England, Canada and the United States, Rowan made nearly 100 appearances in a 7-year career.

== Career ==
Born in Glasgow, Rowan played professionally in Scotland, England, Canada and the United States for Baillieston Juniors, Aston Villa, Toronto Metros, Watford, Morton and the New York Cosmos.

He died on 22 December 2021.
