= Jack Carmichael =

English footballer

Personal information
- Date of birth: 11 November 1948 (age 77)
- Place of birth: Newcastle upon Tyne, England
- Position: Central defender

Youth career
- –1966: Possilpark

Senior career*
Years	Team	Apps	(Gls)
1966–1971	Arsenal	0	(0)
1971–1980	Peterborough United	352	(5)
1980	New England Tea Men	32	(0)
1980–1981	Swindon Town	0	(0)
1981–1982	Jacksonville Tea Men	50	(0)
1982–1983	Peterborough United	6	(0)
Total		440	(5)
- * Club domestic league appearances and goals

Jack Carmichael (born 11 November 1948) is an English former professional footballer who played as a central defender. Active in Scotland, England and the United States, Carmichael made over 400 career league appearances.

== Career ==
Born in Newcastle upon Tyne, Carmichael moved from Scottish junior side Possilpark to English giants Arsenal in 1966. Carmichael never made a league appearance for Arsenal, and later played for Peterborough United and Swindon Town in the Football League, and for the New England Tea Men and the Jacksonville Tea Men in the North American Soccer League.
