= Tim Hunter (soccer) =

Canadian-American soccer player

Personal information
- Full name: Timothy R. Hunter
- Date of birth: March 3, 1954 (age 72)
- Place of birth: Toronto, Ontario, Canada
- Positions: Forward; defender

Youth career
- 1972–1974: Connecticut Huskies

Senior career*
Years	Team	Apps	(Gls)
1975	Connecticut Yankees		(1)
1975–1976	Boston Minutemen	1	(0)
1977	Connecticut Bicentennials	4	(1)
1977	Team Hawaii		
1978	New England Tea Men	2	(0)
- * Club domestic league appearances and goals

Tim Hunter (born March 3, 1954) is a retired Canadian-American soccer player who played professionally in the North American Soccer League. Hunter is arguably the finest midfielder developed in Connecticut.

Born in Canada, Hunter and his brother Paul grew up in Westport, Connecticut. In 1971, he graduated from Staples High School where he was a member of four consecutive state championship soccer teams. In 2008, he was voted among the best midfielders and forwards to play for the school's soccer team. Hunter attended the University of Connecticut where he played on the men's soccer team from 1972 to 1974. He was a 1972 and 1974 Honorable Mention (third team) All American. Hunter was on the American team at the 1975 Pan American Games.

In 1975, Hunter first played with the Connecticut Yankees of the ASL before signing with the Boston Minutemen of the North American Soccer League. In 1977, he began the season with the Connecticut Bicentennials before moving to Team Hawaii where a dispute with English legend Bobby Moore ended his stay. He finished his career in 1978 with the New England Tea Men.

He was inducted into the Connecticut State Soccer Hall of Fame in 2004 and the Fairfield County Sports Hall of Fame in 2008.
