= Team Hawaii =

Defunct American soccer club

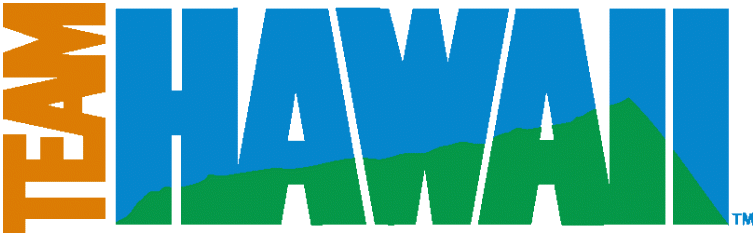
- Full name: Team Hawaii
- Founded: 1977
- Dissolved: 1977 (moved)
- Stadium: Aloha Stadium
- Capacity: 50,000
- Coach: Hubert Vogelsinger; Charlie Mitchell
- League: North American Soccer League
colors	Away colors

Team Hawaii was a soccer team based out of Honolulu that played in the NASL for one season, 1977. Their home field was Aloha Stadium.

After two unsuccessful years as the San Antonio Thunder, the franchise moved to Hawai'i in time for the 1977 season. The club was originally coached by Hubert Vogelsinger, but after he became ill midway through the season, Charlie Mitchell took over and served as player-coach for the remainder of the campaign. On the field, Hawaii had an 11–15 record and failed to qualify for the playoffs, while at the box office, the team never came close to filling their 50,000-seat stadium. (A decent crowd of 12,877 attended their match against the New York Cosmos in April, but none of their other twelve home games drew even half of that; they managed only 4,543 per game for the season.)

Being thousands of miles away from their opponents, travel became a significant issue for Team Hawaii. The club would often go on four- or five-game road trips to the mainland, while visiting teams would usually coordinate playing in Hawaii with games against west coast teams.

With the poor attendances and high travel costs, the club lost an estimated $500,000 to $1 million in 1977. After speculation the franchise would move to Milwaukee, Atlanta or Houston, Team Hawaii officially shifted to Tulsa on November 14, 1977, to become the Tulsa Roughnecks.

To date, they remain Hawaii's only major professional soccer team and one of two major professional sports teams to play in the state (the other being The Hawaiians that played in the WFL in 1974–75). They were also the first island in the Pacific Islands to field a professional soccer team.

== 1977 roster ==
Last updated April 20, 2009. Note: Flags indicate national team as defined under FIFA eligibility rules; some limited exceptions apply. Players may hold more than one non-FIFA nationality.

No.	Pos.	Nation	Player
0	GK	USA	Jimmy Joerg
1	GK	ENG	Peter Fox
2	DF	USA	Chris Carenza
3	DF	BRA	Ismael
3	DF	USA	Dave Stahl
4	DF	USA	Mark Stahl
5	DF	SCO	Charlie Mitchell
6	DF	GER	Peter Nover
7	DF	ENG	Tommy Taylor
8	DF	ENG	Keith Coleman
11	DF	GER	Axel Neumann
13	DF	USA	Ed Pitney
21	DF	CAN	Tim Hunter

No.	Pos.	Nation	Player
9	MF	SCO	Jim Henry
10	MF	POR	Diamantino Costa
10	MF	ENG	Ben Smith
19	MF	ENG	Pat Holland
11	MF	ENG	Chris Dangerfield
—	MF	ENG	Keith Robson
14	FW	CAN	Victor Kodelja
15	FW	USA	Dan Counce
16	FW	ENG	Brian Tinnion
17	FW	SKN	Bert Bowery
18	FW	CYP	Yilmaz Orhan
20	FW	IRL	Hilary Carlyle

== Year-by-year ==
Year	League	W	L	Pts	Reg. season	Playoffs	Attendance
1977	NASL	11	15	106	4th, Pacific Conference, Southern Division	did not qualify	4,543
