= Blagoje Tamindžić =

Yugoslav–Canadian soccer goalkeeper

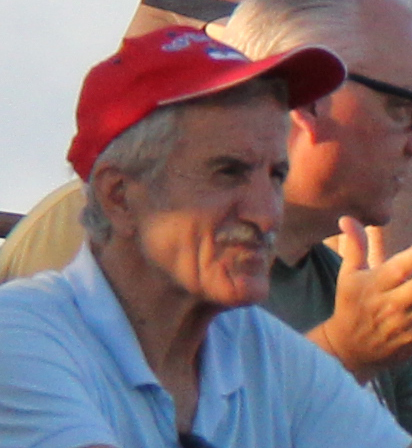
- Tamindžić in 2022

Personal information
- Full name: Blagoje Tamindžić
- Date of birth: April 8, 1952 (age 74)
- Place of birth: Bileća, PR Bosnia and Herzegovina, FPR Yugoslavia
- Height: 1.82 m (6 ft 0 in)
- Position: Goalkeeper

Senior career*
Years	Team	Apps	(Gls)
1973–1975	Serbian White Eagles		
1976	Rochester Lancers	24	(0)
1977–1978	Montreal Castors		
1977	Ottawa Tigers		
1979–1982	Toronto Blizzard	62	(0)
1982–1984	Phoenix Inferno (indoor)	69	(1)
1983	Toronto Nationals		
1984–1985	Chicago Sting	3	(0)
- * Club domestic league appearances and goals

Blagoje Tamindžić (Serbian Cyrillic: Благоје Таминџић; born April 8, 1952) is a retired soccer goalkeeper.

== Club career ==
He was nicknamed Baja, which was also his kit name in one season, as well as Blaggy.

=== Serbian White Eagles ===
Tamindžić played in abroad in the National Soccer League in 1973 with the Serbian White Eagles where in his debut season was named the league's top goalkeeper. He returned to the Serbs the following season where once more he was named the top goalkeeper. Throughout the regular season, he helped the White Eagles win the regular season title. He also helped the club secure the Canadian Open Cup which granted the Serbs a spot in the CONCACAF Champions' Cup.

=== Rochester Lancers ===
In 1976, he joined former head coach Don Popovic south of the border to play in the North American Soccer League with Rochester Lancers. In his debut season in the NASL, he finished the season with a 1.28 goals-against average placing him tenth in the overall goalkeeping stats. He also helped the Lancers secure a playoff berth and played in the opening round of the competition where Rochester was eliminated to Toronto Metros-Croatia. Tamindžić departed from Rochester following the conclusion of the season.

=== Montreal Castors ===
In 1977, he returned to the National Soccer League to sign with Montreal Castors. In late 1977, Tamindžić along with six Montreal players were traded to the Ottawa Tigers in order to assist in their playoff match against Toronto Croatia to gain promotion to the NSL First Division. The transaction provided Montreal with the bargaining rights to Mick Jones. He re-signed with Montreal for the 1978 NSL season.

=== Toronto Blizzard ===
He returned to the national NASL in 1979 to sign with the Toronto Blizzard. After the conclusion of the 1982 season, he was transferred to Phoenix Inferno of the Major Indoor Soccer League.

=== Later career ===
In 1983, he played with the Toronto Nationals of the Canadian Professional Soccer League. In the winter of 1984, he returned to the indoor level to play with Chicago Sting.
