= Pasquale de Luca =

Canadian soccer player and coach

Personal information
- Full name: Pasquale de Luca
- Date of birth: May 26, 1962 (age 64)
- Place of birth: Edmonton, Alberta

Senior career*
Years	Team	Apps	(Gls)
1980-1982	Edmonton Drillers	16	(0)
1980-1982	Edmonton Drillers (indoor)	34	(3)
1982-1984	Toronto Blizzard	53	(3)
1985-1988	Cleveland Force	110	(19)
1986-1987	Edmonton Brick Men	9+	(1+)
1989	Edmonton Ital Canadian SC		

International career
1984–1985	Canada	19	(1)
Medal record
Representing Canada
Men's Association football
CONCACAF Championship
Winner	1985 North America
- * Club domestic league appearances and goals

Pasquale de Luca (surname also spelled DeLuca) (born May 26, 1962 in Edmonton, Alberta) is a former Canadian professional soccer player. He is the head coach of the Edmonton Drillers.

== Club career ==
A native of Edmonton, De Luca played four seasons in the North American Soccer League. He played 1981 and part of 1982 with his hometown Edmonton Drillers. He then played the remainder of 1982 as well as 1983 and 1984 for the Toronto Blizzard. De Luca later played in the original MISL, playing three seasons – 1985–86 through 1987–88 – with the Cleveland Force as a defender. In 1986, he also played for the Edmonton Brick Men in the Western Soccer Alliance.

== International career ==
A forward for Canada, De Luca was a member of the 1984 Olympic team that reached the quarterfinals, going out on penalty kicks to Brazil's 'B' team after a 1–1 draw. de Luca did not however make any appearances either in qualifying or in the tournament finals. He played in 19 full internationals for Canada from 1984 to 1985, scoring one goal. His final international appearance came in the September 1985 match versus Honduras that clinched a berth in the 1986 World Cup.

De Luca was on the 1986 World Cup squad, but did not appear in the finals.

=== International goals ===
Scores and results list Canada's goal tally first.

#	Date	Venue	Opponent	Score	Result	Competition
1	10 March 1985	National Stadium, Port of Spain, Trinidad and Tobago	Trinidad and Tobago		2–1	Friendly match

== Honors ==
Edmonton Drillers

- NASL indoor champion: 1980–81
- NASL indoor season prmiership: 1981–82

Toronto Blizzard

- NASL: 1983 (finalist)
- NASL: 1984 (finalist)

Canada

- CONCACAF Championship: 1985
