= Jorge Berrio =

Argentine footballer

Personal information
- Full name: Jorge Omar Berrio Romano
- Date of birth: May 30, 1951 (age 75)
- Place of birth: Buenos Aires, Argentina
- Position: Defender

Youth career
- River Plate

Senior career*
Years	Team	Apps	(Gls)
1971–1973	River Plate	11	(0)
1971	→ Juventud Antoniana (loan)		
1973	→ San Martín Tucumán (loan)	9	(0)
1974	Magallanes	34	(1)
1975	Everton	32	(1)
1976	Santiago Wanderers	27	(2)
1977	Audax Italiano	32	(3)
1978	Universidad Católica	27	(0)
1979	Memphis Rogues	12	(0)
1979–1980	Memphis Rogues (indoor)		
1980	Memphis Rogues	15	(0)
1980–1981	Jacksonville Tea Men (indoor)	16	(1)
1981	Jacksonville Tea Men	32	(3)
1981–1982	Jacksonville Tea Men (indoor)		
1982	Jacksonville Tea Men	18	(0)
1983	Tulsa Roughnecks (indoor)	2	(1)
1983	Jacksonville Tea Men		
1983–1984	Tulsa Roughnecks (indoor)	7	(0)
1984	Jacksonville Tea Men		
1985–1986	Atlanta	14	(1)
- * Club domestic league appearances and goals

Jorge Omar Berrio Romano is a former Argentine association football defender who played five seasons in the North American Soccer League.

== Career ==
A product of River Plate, Berrio played in Argentina and Chile before emigrating to the United States. In Chile, he played for Magallanes, Everton, Santiago Wanderers, Audax Italiano and Universidad Católica.

In 1979, Berrio signed with the Memphis Rogues of the North American Soccer League. In the fall of 1980, he moved to the Jacksonville Tea Men and played the 1980–1981 NASL indoor season followed by two outdoor NASL seasons. In 1983, the Tea Men moved to the second division American Soccer League, winning the title. He then played one NASL indoor season with the Tulsa Roughnecks in 1983–1984. In 1984, Berrio played one last season with the Tea Men, this time in the United Soccer League.

Back in Argentina, Berrio ended his career with Atlanta.
