= Randy Ragan =

Canadian soccer player (born 1959)

Personal information
- Full name: Randy Lee Ragan
- Date of birth: June 7, 1959 (age 67)
- Place of birth: High Prairie, Alberta, Canada
- Height: 6 ft 1 in (1.85 m)
- Positions: Midfielder; defender

College career
Years	Team	Apps	(Gls)
–1979	Simon Fraser Clan		

Senior career*
Years	Team	Apps	(Gls)
1980–1984	Toronto Blizzard	117	(6)
1980–1981	Toronto Blizzard (indoor)	17	(3)
1986–1987	Toronto Blizzard	19+	(0)
1990	Victoria Vistas	11	(2)
1991	North York Rockets	4	(0)

International career
1976	Canada U20	6	(0)
1980–1986	Canada	40	(0)

Managerial career
- 2007: Guelph Gryphons (men's assistant)
- 2008–: Guelph Gryphons (women's)
Medal record
Representing Canada
Men's Association football
CONCACAF Championship
Winner	1985 North America
- * Club domestic league appearances and goals

Randolph "Randy" Lee Ragan (born June 7, 1959) is a former Canadian elite professional soccer player, who was considered one of the top midfield players in Canada in the 1980s.

== Early life and education ==
Ragan was born in High Prairie, Alberta. At age six, his family moved to Fraser Valley. He graduated from Aldergrove High School in 1976, earning the valedictorian shield. He obtained a degree in psychology from Simon Fraser University and later graduated from law school at York University.

== Career ==
=== Club ===
While studying at Simon Fraser, he played on the men's soccer team. In 1979, Ragan served as captain of the Canadian team at the World University Games.

In 1980, he was the first draft choice of the Toronto Blizzard for the North American Soccer League, and picked ninth overall. He played for the Blizzard from 1980 to 1984, including one indoor NASL season. In 1986, he played with the Blizzard during their 1986 season in the National Soccer League. In 1987, he again played for the Blizzard in the Canadian Soccer League where he was a 1987 First Team All Star. In 1990 he played with the Victoria Vistas. In 1991, he spent one season with the North York Rockets.

=== International ===
In 1976, Ragan played for the Canada U-20 men's national soccer team during its unsuccessful qualification campaign for the 1977 FIFA World Youth Championship.

He went on to play 40 times for the Canadian national team. His first game was a 4–0 win over New Zealand on September 15, 1980. His last was a 1–0 loss to China on August 31, 1986. He played all three games for Canada during the 1986 FIFA World Cup.

Ragan also played nine games with the Canadian Olympic team and was a member of the 1984 Olympic Canadian soccer team which went to the quarterfinals of the 1984 Olympic soccer tournament.

In April 2002, Ragan was inducted into the Canada Soccer Hall of Fame.

=== Coaching ===
Ragan coached the Guelph Royals 1994 Boys A team who play in the Western Ontario Youth Soccer League. In 2007, he served as coach with the University of Guelph men's soccer team. On May 16, 2008, the university hired Ragan as the head coach of the Gryphons Women's team.

== Personal life ==
He and his wife Janet have four sons. Aside from his soccer and coaching career, he also worked as a legal aid attorney. In 2010, he was appointed Chief Technical Officer of the Ontario Soccer Association.

== Honours ==
Canada

- CONCACAF Championship: 1985
