= Juan Carlos Molina (footballer) =

Argentine footballer

Personal information
- Date of birth: 22 February 1955 (age 71)
- Place of birth: Temperley, Argentina
- Height: 6 ft 0 in (1.83 m)
- Positions: Midfielder; forward

Youth career
- 1970–1972: Club Atletico Los Andes (amateur)

Senior career*
Years	Team	Apps	(Gls)
1973–1977	Club Atletico Los Andes	253	(68)
1978–1980	Ferro Carril Oeste	65	(8)
1980–1981	Calgary Boomers (indoor)	17	(16)
1981	Calgary Boomers	29	(5)
1981–1982	Toronto Blizzard (indoor)	18	(15)
1982	Toronto Blizzard	21	(6)
1983	Tampa Bay Rowdies (indoor)	10	(3)
1983	Tampa Bay Rowdies	12	(0)
1983–1984	Phoenix Pride (indoor)	8	(1)
?	Club Atlético Tigre	6	(1)
1986–1987	Club Almirante Brown		
1987–1988	Wichita Wings (indoor)		

International career
1968	Argentina U17		
- * Club domestic league appearances and goals

Juan Carlos Molina (born 22 February 1955) is a retired professional footballer from Argentina that played in the Pimera División, Primera B, the North American Soccer League and the Major Indoor Soccer League.

== Senior career ==
After two years as a youth amateur with the club, Juan Carlos Molina began his professional career in 1973, with Club Atletico Los Andes in the old Primera B. After four seasons at the Estadio Eduardo Gallardón, he joined Ferro Carril Oeste who moved up to the Primera División while Molina was on the squad. He played there from 1977 to 1980, before heading to North America.

== NASL years ==
In late 1980 Molina signed with the Calgary Boomers of the NASL for the winter indoor season, appearing in all but one match. That summer he appeared in 29 of the Boomers' 32 outdoor matches. However, after the 1981 season the Calgary team folded, so Molina moved across Canada to the Toronto Blizzard. While in Toronto, he appeared in all 18 Blizzard indoor matches of the 1981–82 indoor season and 21 of 32 outdoor matches. In a 2008 interview he stated that he believed the Falklands War, which began as the outdoor season started, caused his Toronto coach to limit his playing time because he was Argentine and so many of his teammates were from the United Kingdom. In December 1982 he was traded to the Tampa Bay Rowdies for three draft picks. This move reunited Molina with his Calgary coach, Al Miller. He was a member of the Rowdies' 1983 Indoor Championship winning side, and appeared in twelve outdoor games in 1983 before being sold to the Phoenix Inferno of the Major Indoor Soccer League midseason.

== MISL and later years ==
After Phoenix had acquired Molina in late June 1983 the franchise was renamed the Phoenix Pride. He appeared in only eight matches, scoring once. Phoenix released him in early February 1984.

Returning to Argentina, he had brief stints with Club Atlético Tigre and Club Almirante Brown. Molina closed out his playing career back in the MISL as a member of the Wichita Wings during the 1987–88 season.

== Retirement ==
Beginning in 2000, Molina served as coach of the Argentine, over-40 football team at Hindú Club. He guided them to the victory in 2007 Torneo Amistad. In winning the Amistad title, Hindu Club gained promotion to the over-40 Asociación Intercountry Zona Norte for 2008

== Personal life ==
He was born in Temperley, located in the southern part of the Almirante Brown Partido of Greater Buenos Aires. As of 1989, Molina was married to Gloria Tarantini, and is the father of three daughters; Nadia, Cecilia and Abril.

== Honors ==
Ferro Carril Oeste

- Primera B: 1978

Tampa Bay Rowdies

- NASL indoor: 1983

Hindú Club (coach)

- Torneo Amistad champion: 2007, 2021
