= Cliff Calvert =

English footballer

Personal information
- Full name: Clifford Alistair Calvert
- Date of birth: 21 April 1954 (age 72)
- Place of birth: York, England
- Position: Defender

Senior career*
Years	Team	Apps	(Gls)
1972–1975	York City	67	(0)
1975–1979	Sheffield United	81	(5)
1979–1981	Toronto Blizzard	67	(10)
1981	Dallas Tornado	15	(1)
1982–1984	Toronto Blizzard	65	(8)
1983–1984	Buffalo Stallions (indoor)	46	(16)

International career
1972	England Youth		
- * Club domestic league appearances and goals

Clifford Alistair Calvert (born 21 April 1954) is an English former professional footballer.

== Career ==
Born in York, Calvert joined York City as an amateur in the early 1970s and signed full-time professional terms in July 1972. He was capped by the England national youth team in 1972. He made his debut against Plymouth Argyle in March 1973 in the 1972–73 season. He figured prominently for the club as they won promotion in the 1973–74 season. After making 75 appearances for the club, he was transferred to Sheffield United for a record club fee received of £30,000 in September 1975. He made 81 appearances and scored five goals in the league for United and went on to play for Toronto Blizzard and Dallas Tornado in the North American Soccer League.
