= Conny Karlsson (footballer) =

Swedish footballer and manager

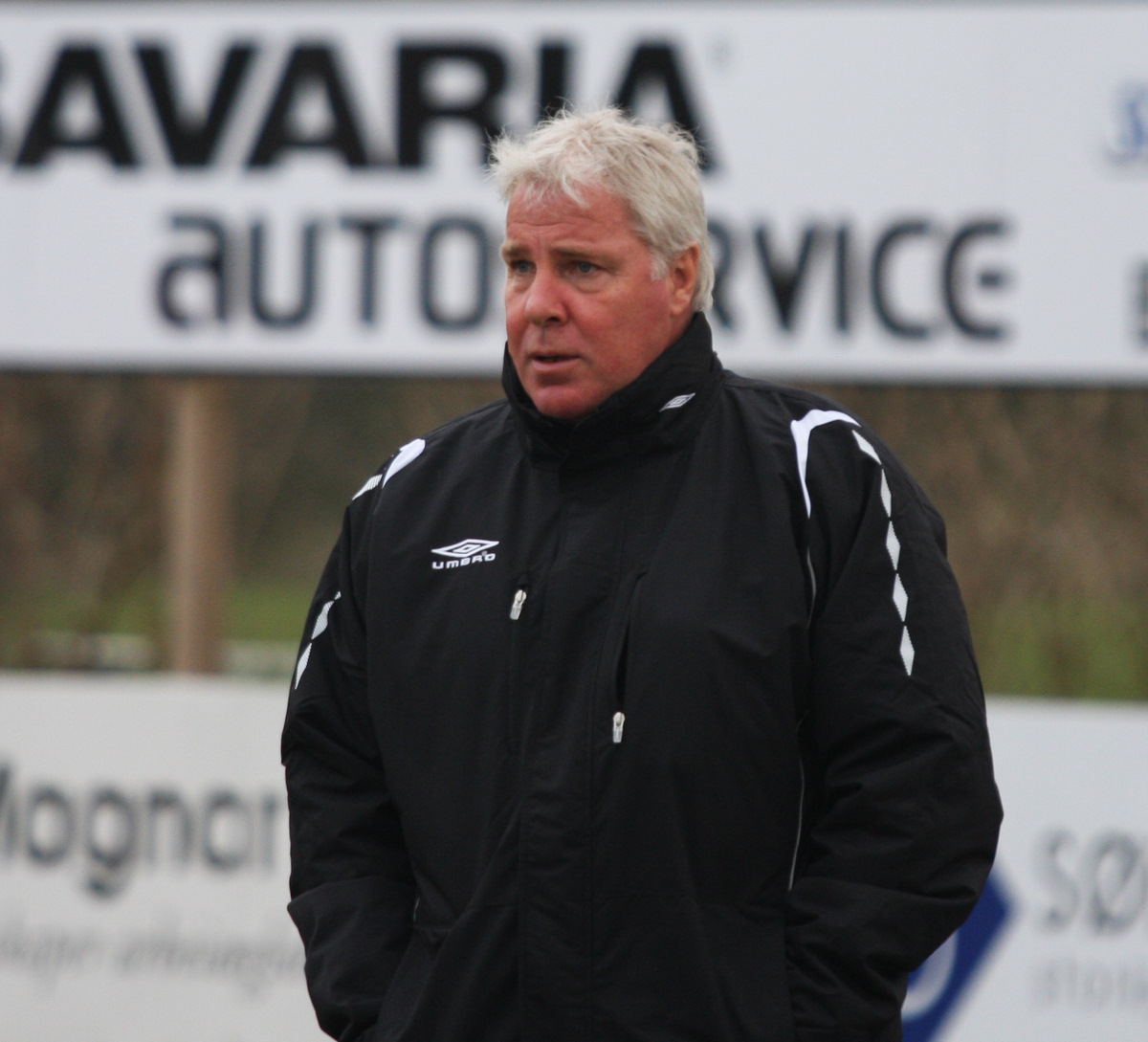
- Conny Karlsson in 2009

Personal information
- Date of birth: 21 November 1953 (age 72)
- Place of birth: Oskarshamn, Sweden
- Position: Defender

Senior career*
Years	Team	Apps	(Gls)
- IFK Oskarshamn
1975–1982	IFK Göteborg		
1983–1984	Toronto Blizzard		
1985–1987	Örgryte IS		

International career
1980–1985	Sweden	4	(0)

Managerial career
- 1989–1990: Örgryte IS
- 1991–1993: Landskrona BoIS
- 1994–1998: FK Haugesund
- 1999–2000: HamKam
- 2000–2002: Kalmar FF
- 2003: Assyriska Föreningen
- 2004–2007: Trelleborgs FF
- 2007–2008: Sarpsborg 08 FF
- 2009: Assyriska Föreningen
- 2010–2012: Helsingborgs IF
- 2012–2013: IK Brage
- 2013–2014: Trelleborgs FF
- 2016: Oskarshamns AIK
- 2017: Stattena IF (Women)
- * Club domestic league appearances and goals

Conny Karlsson (born 21 November 1953) is a Swedish football manager who lastly coached the women's team of Stattena IF.

== Career ==
Born in Oskarshamn, he played for local club IFK Oskarshamn before moving to Swedish giants IFK Göteborg, where he won the 1981–82 UEFA Cup. After a short stint with the Toronto Blizzard, he ended his playing career at Örgryte IS. He was capped 5 times for Sweden.

He began his coaching career at Örgryte IS, first as an assistant-coach, then as first-team coach. He also managed Landskrona BoIS (which he got promoted to Allsvenskan in 1993), HamKam, FK Haugesund, Kalmar FF, Assyriska Föreningen, Trelleborgs FF, Sarpsborg 08 FF and Helsingborgs IF.

After winning Allsvenskan with Helsingborgs IF in 2011, Karlsson decided to withdraw as head coach on 14 June 2012 and was replaced by Åge Hareide.

== Personal life ==
His twin brother, Jerry, is also a former footballer.

== Honours ==
Individual

- Årets ärkeängel: 1975
