= Paul Hunter (soccer, born 1956) =

Canadian soccer player

Personal information
- Date of birth: January 18, 1956 (age 70)
- Place of birth: Toronto, Ontario, Canada
- Position: Defender

Youth career
- 1971–1972: Staples High School

College career
Years	Team	Apps	(Gls)
1974–1976	University of Connecticut		

Senior career*
Years	Team	Apps	(Gls)
1977	New York Cosmos	3	(0)
1978–1980	Detroit Express	59	(0)
1979–1980	Detroit Express (indoor)	9	(2)
1980–1981	Tulsa Roughnecks (indoor)	9	(2)
1981	Tulsa Roughnecks	20	(0)
- * Club domestic league appearances and goals

Paul Hunter (born January 18, 1956) is a Canadian-born retired soccer player. He played for the University of Connecticut Huskies and spent five seasons in the North American Soccer League. His position was defender.

== High school and college ==
While born in Canada, Hunter and his brother Tim grew up in Westport, Connecticut where he attended Staples High School. Staples won the 1971 Connecticut state championship Hunter's junior year. While the team repeated as champions in 1972, Hunter shattered his leg mid-season, putting him out for the rest of the year. He then attended the University of Connecticut, playing on the men's soccer team from 1974 to 1976. He was selected as an honourable mention (third team) All American in 1975 and a first team All American his senior season. He was also team captain that season.

== Professional ==
Hunter signed with the New York Cosmos of the North American Soccer League (NASL) in 1977. He played only three games and refused to train in the offseason with AC Milan in Italy.He was then transferred to the Detroit Express where he became a regular starter for two seasons. In 1980, he played only five games for the Express and in 1981, found himself with the Tulsa Roughnecks where he played twenty games. He also played NASL indoor during the 1979–80 and 1980–81 seasons.

Hunter was inducted into the Connecticut Soccer Hall of Fame in 2004.
