= Tony Betts =

English footballer (born 1953)

Personal information
- Full name: Anthony Thomas Betts
- Date of birth: 31 October 1953 (age 72)
- Place of birth: Derby, England
- Height: 5 ft 11 in (1.80 m)
- Position: Forward

Youth career
- 1969–1974: Aston Villa

Senior career*
Years	Team	Apps	(Gls)
1974–1975	Aston Villa	4	(0)
1974–1975	→ Southport (loan)	8	(1)
1975	Portland Timbers	18	(7)
1975	Port Vale	1	(0)
1975	Boldmere St. Michael's		
1976–1977	Portland Timbers	48	(6)
1979	Minnesota Kicks	1	(0)
1979–1982	Buffalo Stallions (indoor)	70	(13)
Total		151+	(27+)

International career
1972	England Youth	3	(3)
- England Amateurs
- * Club domestic league appearances and goals

Anthony Thomas Betts (born 31 October 1953) is an English former footballer who played as a forward. He played in the Football League, the North American Soccer League, and the Major Indoor Soccer League.

He began his career at Aston Villa, featuring in the 1972 FA Youth Cup final. He was loaned out to Southport in 1974–75 before he emigrated to America to play for the Portland Timbers. He helped the Timbers to the final of the Soccer Bowl in 1975 before briefly returning to England with Port Vale and Boldmere St. Michael's. He returned to Portland Timbers for two more seasons before joining the Minnesota Kicks in 1979. He then spent the last three years of his career with indoor football club Buffalo Stallions.

== Career ==
Betts started his career as a professional at Aston Villa in March 1972 and played for the "Villans" in the 1972 FA Youth Cup final win over Liverpool, playing alongside players such as John Gidman, Alan Little, and Brian Little. He also scored three goals in three games for England Youth. He made four Second Division appearances at Villa Park under the stewardship of Ron Saunders. He was loaned out to Alan Ball's Southport of the Fourth Division, scoring once in eight league appearances in the 1974–75 campaign. His contract with Aston Villa was cancelled in April 1975.

He moved to the United States to play for the Portland Timbers in 1975, who were managed by former Villa manager Vic Crowe. He scored seven goals in 18 games, helping the Timbers to the top of the Western Conference of the North American Soccer League. He scored the golden goal in extra time for Portland in a memorable play-off victory against archival Seattle Sounders on 12 August. They went on to play Soccer Bowl '75 but lost 2–0 to the Tampa Bay Rowdies at Spartan Stadium.

He had a trial with Roy Sproson's Port Vale in September 1975 and started for a 2–1 Third Division defeat at Gillingham on 11 October 1975. He was let go in November that year without making another appearance in 1975–76. He briefly played for Boldmere St. Michael's in the Midland Football Combination, before returning to the Civic Stadium in 1976. He scored five goals in 24 games, becoming the club's top scorer. Betts was retained by new manager Brian Tiler for the 1977 season, though scored just once in 24 games, in a disappointing campaign for the Timbers.

Betts played for the Minnesota Kicks of the North American Soccer League in 1979, gaining one assist in his only appearance at the Metropolitan Stadium for Roy McCrohan's side. The Kicks won the Central Division but were defeated by the Tulsa Roughnecks in the play-offs. He then moved on to the Buffalo Memorial Auditorium to play for the Buffalo Stallions of the Major Indoor Soccer League. He scored four goals in 29 games in 1979–80, as the Stallions were beaten by the Pittsburgh Spirit in the first round of the play-offs. He scored seven goals in 32 appearances in 1980–81, as the Stallions again were beaten at the first stage of the play-offs, this time by the St. Louis Steamers. He scored two goals in nine games in 1981–82 as Buffalo again lost at the first stage of the play-offs, this time being beaten by the New York Arrows. He retired after undergoing knee surgery in 1982.

== Post-retirement ==
After retiring, he settled in the Portland area and founded the West Villa Soccer Club. At the turn of the millennium, he worked as an independent sales rep, selling sports shoes.

== Career statistics ==
Appearances and goals by club, season and competition
Club	Season	League			FA Cup		League Cup		Total	
Club	Season	Division	Apps	Goals	Apps	Goals	Apps	Goals	Apps	Goals
Aston Villa	1974–75	Second Division	4	0	0	0	1	0	5	0
Southport (loan)	1974–75	Fourth Division	8	1	0	0	0	0	8	1
Portland Timbers	1975	NASL	18	7	—		—		18	7
Port Vale	1975–76	Third Division	1	0	0	0	0	0	1	0
Portland Timbers	1976	NASL	24	5	—		—		24	5
Portland Timbers	1977	NASL	24	1	—		—		24	1
Portland Timbers	Total		48	6	0	0	0	0	48	6
Minnesota Kicks	1979	NASL	1	0	—		—		1	0
Buffalo Stallions	1979–80	MISL	29	4	—		—		29	4
Buffalo Stallions	1980–81	MISL	32	7	—		—		32	7
Buffalo Stallions	1981–82	MISL	9	2	—		—		9	2
Buffalo Stallions	Total		70	13	0	0	0	0	70	13

== Honours ==
Aston Villa

- FA Youth Cup: 1972

Portland Timbers

- North American Soccer League Western Conference: 1975
- Soccer Bowl runner-up: 1975

Minnesota Kicks

- North American Soccer League Central Division: 1979
