= Mike McLenaghen =

Canadian soccer player

Personal information
- Full name: Terence Moore
- Date of birth: June 10, 1954 (age 72)
- Place of birth: Burnaby, British Columbia
- Positions: Defender; midfielder

Youth career
- Pegusus

College career
Years	Team	Apps	(Gls)
1977–1978	Simon Fraser	43	(25)

Senior career*
Years	Team	Apps	(Gls)
1979	Minnesota Kicks	20	(0)
1980	Minnesota Kicks (indoor)	3	(0)
1980–1981	Toronto Blizzard	29	(0)
1981	Toronto Blizzard (indoor)	15	(4)
1981	Los Angeles Aztecs	20	(0)
1982	Edmonton Drillers	27	(0)
Total		114	(31)

International career
1973	Canada U-20	4	(0)
1975–1981	Canada	8	(0)
- * Club domestic league appearances and goals

Mike McLenaghen (born June 10, 1954 in Burnaby, British Columbia) is a Canadian former North American Soccer League player and member of the Canadian national soccer team.

== Early life ==
McLenaghen also excelled at lacrosse as a teenager, participating in the Canadian national championship Minto Cup. He was a member of his local senior soccer club Pegusus F.C. at age 15 and captained Canadian's 1972 National Youth soccer team.

== Soccer career ==
McLenaghen was a member of the Canadian olympic team for the 1976 Summer Olympics and played collegiately in 1977 and 1978 for Simon Fraser University. McLenaghen played four seasons in the NASL, each one on a different team. He played the summer of 1979 with the Minnesota Kicks, 1980 with the Toronto Blizzard, 1981 for Los Angeles Aztecs, and 1982 with the Edmonton Drillers.

McLenaghen played eight 'A' internationals for Canada, once in 1975 (against Cuba), six times in 1980, and once in 1981. He did not score any international goals. He also played for Vancouver Columbus FC in the 1987–88 season.
