= George Gibbs (footballer, born 1953) =

English footballer

Personal information
- Date of birth: 23 December 1953 (age 72)
- Place of birth: London, England
- Positions: Defender; midfielder

Youth career
- 1970–1971: Cardiff City

Senior career*
Years	Team	Apps	(Gls)
1971–1974	Erith & Belvedere		
1974–1975	Rochester Lancers	29	(5)
1977–1978	Bath City		
1979–1980	Toronto Blizzard	53	(8)
1979	→ Tulsa Roughnecks (exhibition)	0	(0)
1980	Toronto Blizzard (indoor)	3	(0)
1981	Tulsa Roughnecks (indoor)	3	(0)
1981	Tulsa Roughnecks	19	(1)
1981–1982	Kansas City Comets (indoor)	7	(0)
Total		114	(14)
- * Club domestic league appearances and goals

George Gibbs (born 23 December 1953) is an English former professional footballer who played as a defender and midfielder.

== Career ==
Born in London, Gibbs played in the United States and Canada for Rochester Lancers, Toronto Blizzard, Tulsa Roughnecks and Kansas City Comets.
