= Utz Claassen =

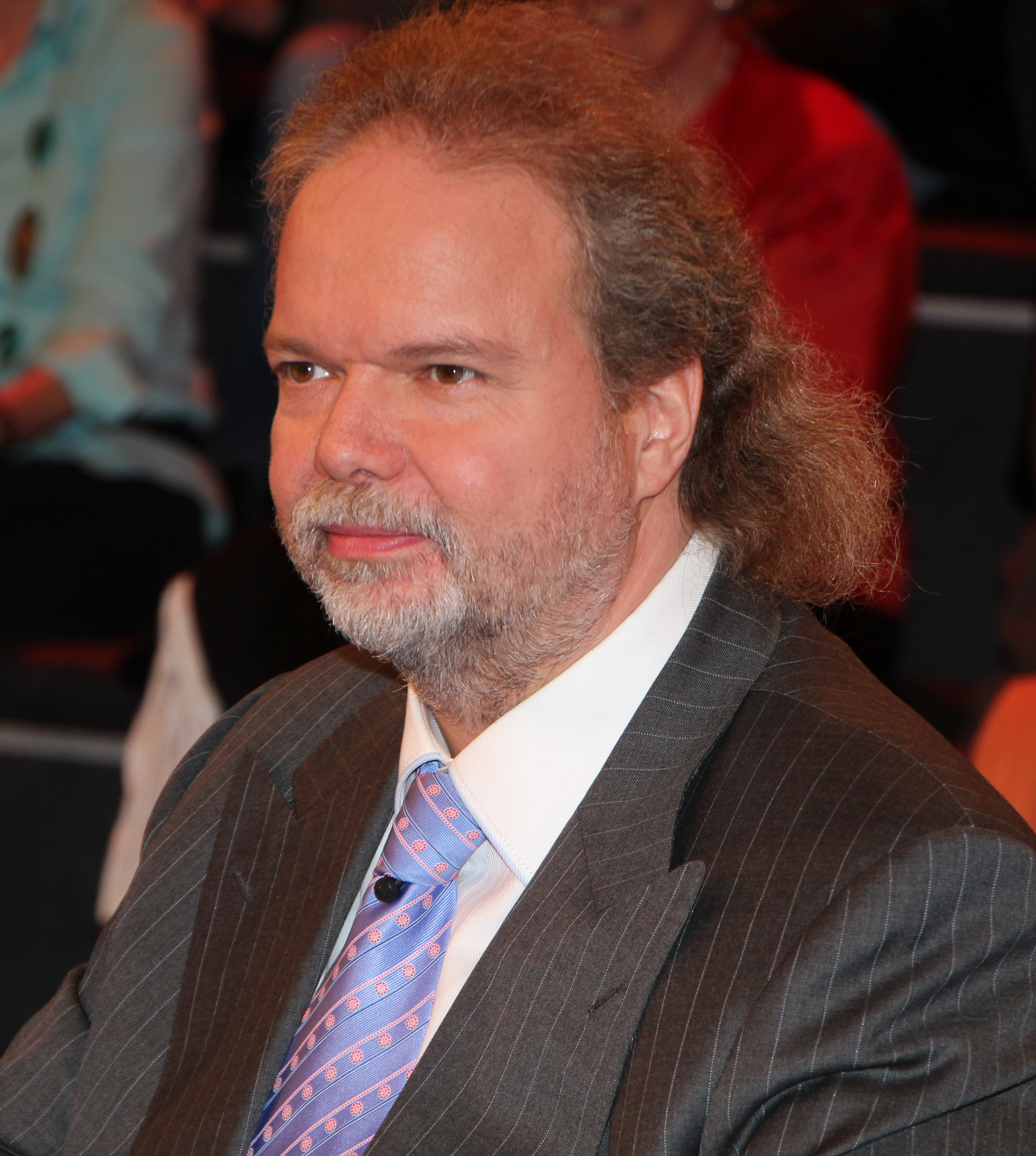
- Claassen in 2011
- Born: 7 May 1963 (age 63); Hannover, Nether saxony, Germany
- Education: Abitur
- Occupations: Manager, management consultant, entrepreneur, investor and author
- Website: http://www.utz-claassen.de/

Utz Claassen (born May 7, 1963 in Hannover) is a German manager, management consultant, entrepreneur, investor and author. He has held senior management positions in some of Germany’s most prominent companies such as Volkswagen and EnBW.

In 2023, the Hanover public prosecutor's office began investigations into suspicion of delaying bankruptcy at Syntellix and later also into fraud against Claasen. A number of former employees sued and are suing Claasen for unpaid wages at the Hanover Regional Court (as of September 2024).

== Education ==
In 1980 Claassen earned his high school diploma (Abitur) after skipping two grades with a grade point average of 0.7 (close to the highest value possible on the German scale). As this was the best diploma score a high school student had hitherto achieved in Germany, he was invited to the German ARD (broadcaster) TV show "Auf Los geh's los".

Claassen studied economics at Leibniz University Hannover and at Oxford University. From 1986 to 1987, he served as the President of all post-graduate students at Magdalen College and of the entire University of Oxford. In 1985 and 1989, respectively, he obtained his master's degree (Diplom) and his Doctorate at the University of Hannover with distinguished grades each.

== Career ==
=== Early years ===
Utz Claassen began his career in 1987 as a consultant at McKinsey & Company. In 1989 he moved to Ford Europe, where he was responsible for the management control system and worked in a team implementing measures for simultaneous engineering. Thereafter, Volkswagen appointed him to oversee their management control system. From 1992 to 1994 he rose through the ranks of the car-manufacturer and eventually became an executive director.

=== Senior positions ===
==== CFO at SEAT ====
A few days after his 31st birthday, Claassen was then appointed chief financial officer of SEAT, a subsidiary of Volkswagen. Whereas the automaker had accumulated a significant deficit in 1993, the company became profitable again within three years under Claassen's leadership.

==== CEO at Sartorius ====
From 1997 until 2003 he served as Chairman of the Executive Board and Group CEO of Sartorius AG, which manufactures pharmaceutical and laboratory equipment. During his time at Sartorius, Claassen oversaw several acquisitions along with a significant increase in revenues.

==== CEO at EnBW ====
In 2003 he was appointed CEO/Chairman of the Board of Management of EnBW Energie Baden-Württemberg AG, the third largest utility company in Germany. While in office, he managed to turn annual losses of over 1 billion euros in 2003 into a record profit for three years in a row, before he left the energy supplier in 2007. Acknowledging his efforts to assume social and economic responsibility alongside the corporation's foreign engagement, Russia awarded him with the Order of Saint Nicholas the Wonderworker in 2005 and France with the knight-class order of the Légion d'Honneur in 2006.

==== Board member at AWD ====
From 2008 to 2013 he served as a member of the Supervisory Board of AWD Holding AG, one of Germany's largest financial service providers.

==== Founder and chairman of the board of directors at Syntellix ====
In 2008 he set up the medical technology startup Syntellix, which develops and manufactures a biodegradable implant to cure fractures. For this product Syntellix has won a number of innovation prizes such as the Top 100 innovation award of 2017. In addition, Claassen himself received the award as "Most Innovative Entrepreneur International 2016" from the hands of EU Commissioner Günther Oettinger. While Claassen remains chairman of the board of directors, the company claims to have sold 27.000 "Magnesix" implants worldwide as of March 2017.

==== CEO at Solar Millennium ====
In early 2010 he briefly entered the renewable energy corporation Solar Millennium AG as its CEO. After three months, he used his contractually granted right to resign immediately within a predefined period of consideration. He justified this step by explaining that he had been given misleading information by Solar Millennium prior to accepting the position as CEO. In April 2013, a legal dispute that had evolved around the resignation ended with the legally binding conclusion that Classen's resignation was lawful, valid and justified.

==== President of RCD Mallorca ====
From December 2014 until June 2016, Claassen worked as President of RCD Mallorca. During his tenure he focussed on restructuring the soccer club through a strategic reorientation. In January 2016 he handed the club over to the ACQ Lagacy Partners LLC by transferring 80 percent of its shares within the context of a capital increase by more than 20 million euros. This was also the first engagement by National Basketball Association franchise owners in European soccer.

== Academic life ==
Since 2001 Claassen has worked as a professor at the University of Göttingen and Leibniz University Hannover, where he holds lectures on management control systems and serves as an academic ambassador. Starting in 2009 he also gave management courses at GISMA Business School.

Besides, Claassen has released numerous scientific publications covering topics such as leadership, knowledge as well as risk management and entrepreneurial innovation.
