= Axel Neumann =

German footballer

Personal information
- Date of birth: 22 April 1952 (age 74)
- Place of birth: Berlin, Germany
- Positions: Defender; midfielder

Senior career*
Years	Team	Apps	(Gls)
1974–1975	Tennis Borussia Berlin	0	(0)
1975	Boston Minutemen	12	(0)
1977	Team Hawaii	11	(0)
1977	Las Vegas Quicksilvers	8	(3)
1978	San Diego Sockers	26	(3)
1979–1980	California Surf	14	(0)
Total		71	(6)
- * Club domestic league appearances and goals

Axel Neumann (born 22 April 1952) is a German retired professional footballer who played professionally in the North American Soccer League.

A defender and midfielder, Neumann began his career with Tennis Borussia Berlin. In 1975, he moved to the United States and signed with the Boston Minutemen of the North American Soccer League. In 1977, he began the season with Team Hawaii. On 8 July 1977, he moved to the Las Vegas Quicksilvers.
