= Mark Stahl (soccer) =

American soccer player

Personal information
- Date of birth: August 28, 1953 (age 73)
- Place of birth: San Francisco, California, United States
- Height: 5 ft 9 in (1.75 m)
- Position: Defender

Senior career*
Years	Team	Apps	(Gls)
1975–1976	San Antonio Thunder	35	(0)
1977	Team Hawaii	15	(0)
1978–1980	Houston Hurricane	39	(0)
1978–1979	Houston Summit (indoor)	23	(6)
1979–1980	Pittsburgh Spirit (indoor)	11	(0)
- * Club domestic league appearances and goals

Mark Stahl (born 28 August 1953) is an American former professional soccer player. He played as a defender in the North American Soccer League and the Major Indoor Soccer League from 1975 to 1980.

== Playing career ==
Stahl was born in San Francisco, California and graduated from St. Ignatius College Preparatory. In 1975, he signed with the San Antonio Thunder of the North American Soccer League. Stahl moved with the team when it became Team Hawaii in 1977. In 1978, he moved to the Houston Hurricane where he played three seasons In the fall of 1978, the Houston Summit became a charter member of the Major Indoor Soccer League. The team drew most of its players, including Stahl, from the Hurricane. On December 28, 1979, he went on loan from the Hurricane to the Pittsburgh Spirit for the 1979-1980 MISL season.
