= Victor Kodelja =

Canadian soccer player

Personal information
- Date of birth: November 26, 1951 (age 74)
- Place of birth: Capua, Italy
- Positions: Forward; defender

Youth career
- Columbus

Senior career*
Years	Team	Apps	(Gls)
1974	Vancouver Whitecaps	15	(2)
1976	San Antonio Thunder	19	(4)
1977	Team Hawaii	23	(4)
1978	San Jose Earthquakes	15	(3)
1980–1981	Calgary Boomers (indoor)	18	(10)
1981	Calgary Boomers	31	(2)
1982–1983	Toronto Blizzard	59	(2)
1983–1984	Chicago Sting (indoor)	5	(1)
1984	Chicago Sting	24	(0)
1984–1985	Chicago Sting (indoor)		

International career
1974–1977	Canada	8	(0)
- * Club domestic league appearances and goals

Victor Kodelja (born November 26, 1951) is a former member of the Canadian national soccer team and North American Soccer League.

== Professional ==
Prior to playing professionally, Kodelja played in the Pacific Coast Soccer League, playing at least the 1969–70 season with Columbus F.C. In 1974, he signed with the Vancouver Whitecaps in the team's inaugural season in the league. In 1976, he moved to the San Antonio Thunder. At the end of the season, the team moved to Hawaii where it became Team Hawaii in 1977. In 1978, he was back on the mainland with the San Jose Earthquakes; 1981 with the Calgary Boomers; 1982 and 1983 with the Toronto Blizzard; and 1984 with the Chicago Sting. He remained with the Sting when the team moved to the Major Indoor Soccer League following the collapse of the NASL.

== National team ==
Kodelja played eight times for Canada from 1974 through 1977. He debuted for the national team on 12 April 1974 in a scoreless draw versus Bermuda in Hamilton, Bermuda. His final cap came on 12 October 1977 in a 2–1 victory over Suriname in Mexico City, being replaced by Brian Budd at half time.
