= Calgary Boomers =

Defunct Canadian soccer club

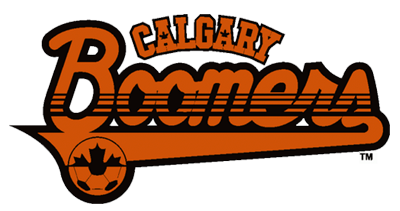
- Full name: Calgary Boomers
- Nickname: Boomers
- Founded: 1980
- Dissolved: 1981
- Stadium: McMahon Stadium; Stampede Corral (indoor)
- Capacity: 32,454; 6,475
- Chairman: Nelson Skalbania
- Head coach: Al Miller
- League: North American Soccer League
Home colours	Away colours

The Calgary Boomers were a Canadian soccer team that competed in the North American Soccer League (NASL) for the 1980–81 Indoor and 1981 outdoor seasons. The team was based in Calgary and played their home games at Stampede Corral during the indoor season and McMahon Stadium for outdoor matches. Originally founded as the Memphis Rogues, the team relocated to Calgary when it was purchased by Nelson Skalbania after the 1980 season. After loses of over $2 million during its operations, the team was placed into receivership and its assets sold.

== History ==
Founded as the Memphis Rogues in 1978, the team was purchased for $1.2 million by Nelson Skalbania, during the 1980 North American Soccer League season with the intention of moving the team to Calgary, as Skalbania did the Atlanta Flames which he purchased five months previously. The team debuted in the 1980–81 NASL Indoor season finishing its initial campaign with a record of 10 win and 8 losses with an average attendance of 4,672 and only missing out of a playoff berth base on goals scored. The Boomers finished the 1981 outdoor in second place in Northwest Division with 17 wins and 15 losses and a season average attendance of 10,501. The number 8 seed in the playoffs, the Boomers lost to the Fort Lauderdale Strikers in best of three games first round 3–1 on August 23 and 2–0 on August 26.

At a press conference on September 16, 1981, owner Nelson Skalbania announced that unless the team could sell 6,500 indoor season tickets and a local ownership group found to purchase the team, the organization would cease operations the following Monday. The next day, the league announced the Boomers were one of five teams that failed to post the required $150,000 bond to participate in the 1981–82 NASL Indoor season. The following week, it was reported that GM Rudi Schiffer had delivered the $150,000 performance bond nine days after the deadline while attending the NASL meetings in Toronto and that a group of local businessmen had conditionally purchased the team in an effort to keep it Calgary. A few days later on September 28, 1981, it was announced that the Boomers would merge with the Edmonton Drillers with Skalbania selling his interest in the team to Edmonton Oilers owner Peter Pocklington. The following day, however, the team which recorded loses over $2 million, was placed into receivership, the deal fell through and the Boomer players were released to other team via a dispersal draft. Skalbania was later ordered by the Supreme Court of British Columbia to pay Memphis Rogues owner Avron Fogelman the $1.1 million balance of the team's original purchase price, having only paid the initial $125,000 down payment.

== Coach ==
- (United States) Al Miller; Head coach 1980–1981
- (Canada) David Davies (Coach)

== Year-by-year ==
Year	League	W	L	Pts	Regular season	Playoffs
1980–81	NASL Indoor	10	8	—	3rd, Northern Division	did not qualify
1981	NASL	17	15	151	2nd, Northwest Division	Lost 1st Round (Ft. Lauderdale)

== Honors ==
All-Star Second Team Selections

- 1981 Franz Gerber

Indoor All-Star Selections

- 1980–81 Juan Carlos Molina

Canadian Soccer Hall of Fame

- 2011 Victor Kodelja

U.S. Soccer Hall of Fame

- 2024 Francisco Marcos
