= Ivan Lukačević (footballer) =

Croatian footballer

Personal information
- Date of birth: 7 October 1946
- Place of birth: Osijek, FPR Yugoslavia
- Date of death: 26 July 2003 (aged 56)
- Place of death: Osijek, Croatia
- Position: Striker

Senior career*
Years	Team	Apps	(Gls)
- Mladost Seleš
- Dinamo Orlovnjak
- Valpovka Valpovo
- Belišće
1975–1982	Osijek	153	(69)
1975–1978	Toronto Metros-Croatia	35	(27)
1979–1980	Toronto Blizzard	45	(17)
Total		233	(113)
- * Club domestic league appearances and goals

Ivan Lukačević (7 October 1946 – 26 July 2003) was a Croatian professional footballer who played as a striker.

== Career ==
Lukačević played in Croatia for Mladost Seleš, Dinamo Orlovnjak, NK Valpovka Valpovo, NK Belišće and NK Osijek, and in the NASL between 1975 and 1980 for the Toronto Metros-Croatia and Toronto Blizzard. He scored the second of Toronto's three goals in the 54th minute of their 3–0 Soccer Bowl victory in 1976.
