= Jimmy Kelly (footballer, born 1957) =

English footballer

Jim Kelly
Personal information
- Full name: James William Kelly
- Date of birth: 2 May 1957 (age 69)
- Place of birth: Carlisle, Cumberland, England
- Position: Midfielder

Senior career*
Years	Team	Apps	(Gls)
1974–1976	Manchester United	1	(0)
1976–1978	Chicago Sting	58	(8)
1978	Los Angeles Aztecs	7	
1979–1981	Tulsa Roughnecks (indoor)	24	(9)
1980–1981	Tulsa Roughnecks	39	(3)
1981	Toronto Blizzard	7	
1981–1982	Toronto Blizzard (indoor)	9	(6)
1982–1983	Los Angeles Lazers	8	(1)
- * Club domestic league appearances and goals

James William Kelly (born 2 May 1957) is an English former footballer. His regular position was as a midfielder. He was born in Carlisle, Cumbria. He played for Manchester United, Chicago Sting, Tulsa Roughnecks, Los Angeles Aztecs, and Toronto Blizzard.
