= Toronto Blizzard (1971–1984) =

NASL soccer team

- Full name: Toronto Blizzard
- Nicknames: Blizzard; Metros; Metros-Croatia
- Founded: 1971
- Dissolved: 1984; 42 years ago
- Stadium: Varsity Stadium (1971-1978), Lamport Stadium (1976); Exhibition Stadium (1979–1983); Indoor: Maple Leaf Gardens
- Capacity: 21,739 (Varsity); 54,741 (Exhibition); Indoor: 16,845
- League: North American Soccer League
Home colours	Away colours

The Toronto Blizzard was a professional soccer club based in Toronto, Ontario, Canada that played in the North American Soccer League (NASL).

== History ==
The Toronto Metros joined the NASL in 1971. Their home ground was Varsity Stadium.

In 1975, 50% of the team was purchased for $250,000 by the Toronto Croatia of the National Soccer League (NSL), and the team became the Toronto Metros-Croatia. Even though the club won the 1976 Soccer Bowl championship they continued to struggle at the gate. In mid September 1976, it was reported the team owed $100,000 to the Ontario government and $95,000 to the metropolitan Toronto government, that several star players were free agents and the team might fold.

The Global Television Network purchased 85% of the struggling Toronto Metros-Croatia on February 1, 1979, for $2.6 million. Following the purchase, Toronto Croatia returned to the NSL as a separate club. With only 7 of the 26 players from the 1978 roster staying, the NASL team was renamed the Toronto Blizzard following the takeover. Under the new ownership, total attendance nearly doubled. From 1979 to 1983 the Blizzard played home games at Exhibition Stadium before returning to Varsity Stadium for the 1984 NASL season.

The Blizzard were members of the NASL until 1984, the last year of league operations. The team were runners-up for the league championship in 1983, losing the Soccer Bowl to the Tulsa Roughnecks 2–0 in front of nearly sixty thousand people at Vancouver's BC Place Stadium. They were runners-up again in 1984 when they lost to the Chicago Sting two games to none in a best of three championship series. The club was coached in these final two years by Bobby Houghton, assisted by Dave Turner and featured Roberto Bettega, David Byrne, Cliff Calvert, Pasquale De Luca, Charlie Falzon, Sven Habermann, Paul Hammond, Paul James, Conny Karlsson, Victor Kodelja, Trevor McCallum, Colin Miller, Jan Möller, Jimmy Nicholl, Ace Ntsoelengoe, Randy Ragan, Neill Roberts, John Paskin, Derek Spalding and Bruce Wilson in its lineup.

The Blizzard qualified for the play-offs on only two other occasions, in 1979 and 1982, losing in the first round each time. Prominent players during the first four years included Clyde Best, Željko Bilecki, Jimmy Bone, Roberto Bettega, Drew Busby, David Byrne, Cliff Calvert, Tony Chursky, David Fairclough, Colin Franks, George Gibbs, Jimmy Greenhoff, Graham Hatley, Victor Kodelja, Sam Lenarduzzi, Peter Lorimer, Ivan Lukačević, Drago Vabec, Mike McLenaghen, Willie McVie, Alan Merrick, Charlie Mitchell, Juan Carlos Molina, Jan Möller, Francesco Morini, Ace Ntsoelengoe, Bobby Prentice, Randy Ragan, Neill Roberts, Malcolm Robertson, Peter Roe, Jomo Sono, Gordon Sweetzer, Blagoje Tamindžić, José Velásquez and Bruce Wilson.

The Metros-Croatia fielded a team in the NASL's indoor tournaments in 1975 and 1976, and the Blizzard played in the NASL’s indoor league from 1980 through 1982.

In 2010, the 1976 Soccer Bowl winning team was inducted into the Canada Soccer Hall of Fame.

== Media Coverage ==
During the time as the Metros and Metros-Croatia, television coverage was almost nonexistent and radio coverage unknown. There was a brief national TV contract with CBC Television in 1971 that ended after one year. The Metros-Croatia's championship match versus Minnesota in 1976 wasn't even covered by Canadian television. The team even resorted to getting a closed circuit television arrangement for their April 30, 1978 away match vs Detroit. As the rebranded Blizzard were owned by Global Television, it should be no surprise Global had Blizzard TV coverage from 1979 to 1982. CHIN radio broadcast matches not covered on TV.

== Year-by-year team record ==
Year	League	W	L	T	Pts	Reg. season	Playoffs	Avg. attendance
As Toronto Metros
1971	NASL	5	10	9	89	3rd, Northern Division	did not qualify	5,922
1972	NASL	4	6	4	53	4th, Northern Division	did not qualify	7,173
1973	NASL	6	4	9	89	1st, Northern Division	Lost Semifinal (Philadelphia)	5,961
1974	NASL	9	10	1	87	2nd, Northern Division	did not qualify	3,458
As Toronto Metros-Croatia
1975	NASL	13	9	—	114	2nd, Northern Division	Lost Quarterfinal (Tampa Bay)	6,271
1976	NASL	15	9	—	123	2nd, Atlantic Conference, Northern Division	Won 1st Round (Rochester); Won Division Championship (Chicago); Won Conference Championship (Tampa Bay); Won Soccer Bowl '76 (Minnesota)	6,079
1977	NASL	13	13	—	115	1st, Atlantic Conference, Northern Division	Lost Conference Semifinal (Rochester)	7,336
1978	NASL	16	14	—	144	3rd, National Conference, Eastern Division	Lost 1st Round (Vancouver)	6,233
As Toronto Blizzard
1979	NASL	14	16	—	133	3rd, National Conference, Eastern Division	Lost Conference Quarterfinal (New York)	11,821
1980	NASL	14	18	—	128	3rd, National Conference, Eastern Division	Won 1st Round (Los Angeles); Lost Quarterfinal (Chicago)	15,040
1981	NASL	7	25	—	77	4th, Eastern Division	did not qualify	7,287
1982	NASL	17	15	—	151	3rd, Eastern Division	Lost 1st Round (Seattle)	8,152
1983	NASL	16	14	—	135	3rd, Eastern Division	Won 1st Round (Vancouver); Won Semifinals (Montreal); Lost Soccer Bowl '83 (Tulsa)	11,630
1984	NASL	14	10	—	117	2nd, Eastern Division	Won Semifinals (San Diego); Lost Championship (Chicago)	11,452

=== Indoor seasons ===
Year	League	W	L	Pts	Regular season	Playoffs	Avg. attendance
1975	NASL indoor	2	1	2	4th, Region 1 (in Dallas)	did not qualify	
1976	NASL indoor	1	1	2	3rd, Midwest Regional (in Chicago)	did not qualify	
1980/81	NASL Indoor	5	13	—	4th, Northern Division	did not qualify	5,702
1981/82	NASL Indoor	8	10	—	2nd, American Conference, East Division	did not qualify	5,142

== Championships ==
- North American Soccer League, Soccer Bowl: 1976
- Divisions: 1973, 1977
- Conference: 1976

== Ownership ==
- John Fisher (1971–74)
- Sam Paric (1975–78)
- Global Television Network (1979–81)
- Karsten von Werseb (1981–84)

== Head coaches ==
- (Scotland) Graham Leggat (1971–72)
- (Portugal) Arthur Rodrigues (1972–74)
- (Canada) Frank Pike (1975 indoor season only)
- (Socialist Federal Republic of Yugoslavia) Ivan Marković (1975–76)
- (Socialist Federal Republic of Yugoslavia) Marijan Bilić (1976) interim
- (Socialist Federal Republic of Yugoslavia) Domagoj Kapetanović (1976, 1978)
- (Socialist Federal Republic of Yugoslavia) Ivan Sangulin (1977)
- (England) Keith Eddy (1979–81)
- (England) Bob Houghton (1982–84)

== Assistant coaches ==
- (England) Dave Turner (1982–84)

== Notable players ==
- (Argentina) Juan Carlos Molina
- (Brazil) Ivair Ferreira
- (Bermuda) Clyde Best
- (Canada) Nick Albanis
- (Canada) Aldo D'Alfonso
- (Canada) Željko Bilecki
- (Canada) Brian Budd
- (Canada) Tony Chursky
- (Canada) Pasquale de Luca
- (Canada) Charlie Falzon
- (Canada) Tibor Gemeri
- (Canada) Sven Habermann
- (Canada) Graham Hately
- (Canada) Robert Iarusci
- (Canada) Patrick Harrington
- (Canada) Paul James
- (Canada) Victor Kodelja
- (Canada) Sam Lenarduzzi
- (Canada) Trevor McCallum
- (Canada) Mike McLenaghen
- (Canada) Dave McQueen
- (Canada) Colin Miller
- (Canada) Randy Ragan
- (Canada) Peter Roe
- (Canada) Gordon Sweetzer
- (Canada) Gordon Wallace
- (Canada) Bruce Wilson
- (Cayman Islands) Renard Moxam
- (England) Cliff Calvert
- (England) David Fairclough
- (England) Colin Franks
- (England) George Gibbs
- (England) Jimmy Greenhoff
- (England) Steve Harris-Byrne
- (England) Jimmy Kelly
- (England) Alec Lindsay
- (England) Alan Merrick
- (England) Dave Needham
- (England) Phil Parkes
- (England) Brian Talbot
- (England) Dick Howard
- (Greece) Vasilis Konstantinou
- (Greece) Nikos Sevastopoulos
- (Republic of Ireland) Conleth Davey
- (Republic of Ireland) Dave Henderson
- (Italy) Alessandro Abbondanza
- (Italy) Roberto Bettega
- (Italy) Francesco Morini
- (Italy) Marino Perani
- (Nigeria) Damian Ogunsuyi
- (Northern Ireland) Jimmy Nicholl
- (Peru) José Velásquez
- (Peru) Juan Carlos Ramirez Gaston
- (Portugal) Eusébio
- (Rhodesia) Robert Godoka
- (Scotland) Jimmy Bone
- (Scotland) Drew Busby
- (Scotland) Alex Cropley
- (Scotland) Duncan Davidson
- (Scotland) Peter Lorimer
- (Scotland) Ian MacHattie
- (Scotland) Willie McVie
- (Scotland) Charlie Mitchell
- (Scotland) Bobby Prentice
- (Scotland) Malcolm Robertson
- (Scotland) Derek Spalding
- (South Africa) David Byrne
- (South Africa) Ace Ntsoelengoe
- (South Africa) John Paskin
- (South Africa) Neill Roberts
- (South Africa) Jomo Sono
- (South Africa) Julius Sono
- (South Africa) Geoff Wegerle
- (Sweden) Tore Cervin
- (Sweden) Conny Karlsson
- (Sweden) Jan Möller
- (Turkey) Gungor Tekin
- (United States) Dan Counce
- (United States) Paul Hammond
- (United States) Jimmy McAlister
- (United States) Alan Merrick
- (United States) Derek Spalding
- (West Germany) Arno Steffenhagen
- (Socialist Federal Republic of Yugoslavia) Sead Sušić
- (Socialist Federal Republic of Yugoslavia) Blagoje Tamindžić
- (Socialist Federal Republic of Yugoslavia) Filip Blašković
- (Socialist Federal Republic of Yugoslavia) Drago Vabec
- (Socialist Federal Republic of Yugoslavia) Ivica Grnja
- (Socialist Federal Republic of Yugoslavia) Ivan Lukačević
- (Socialist Federal Republic of Yugoslavia) Damir Šutevski
- (Socialist Federal Republic of Yugoslavia) Vojin Lazarević
- (Socialist Federal Republic of Yugoslavia) Stjepan Loparić

== After the NASL ==
On March 28, 1985, the NASL officially suspended operations for the 1985 season, when only Toronto and Minnesota Strikers were interested in playing. In the meantime Blizzard owners York-Hanover purchased Dynamo Latino of the National Soccer League with the intention of renaming them the Toronto Blizzard. Though the Blizzard franchise had never actually folded, they had ceased operations for several months between these incarnations and NSL regulations did not permit a name change in the midst of the season. The following season (1986) Dynamo Latino began play as the Toronto Blizzard. A history of this team can be found at Toronto Blizzard (1986–93).

== Bibliography ==
- Wangerin, David. Soccer in a Football World: The Story of America's Forgotten Game. WSC Book (2006).
