= 1981 North American Soccer League season =

Soccer league season

North American Soccer League 1981 season
- Season: 1981
- Teams: 21
- Champions: Chicago Sting
- Premiers: New York Cosmos (5th title)
- Matches: 336
- Goals: 1,234 (3.67 per match)
- Top goalscorer: (Italy) Giorgio Chinaglia (New York Cosmos) (29 goals)
- Highest attendance: 50,755; Washington at Montreal (August 18)
- Lowest attendance: 1,861; Dallas at Chicago (May 10)
- Average attendance: 14,084

Statistics of North American Soccer League in season 1981. This was the 14th season of the NASL.

== Overview ==
There were a total of 21 teams participating. Three teams (Houston, Rochester and Washington) folded, while four others (Memphis, Detroit, New England and Philadelphia) moved to new cities. Playoff series were switched from the two matches plus a mini-game tiebreaker used since 1977, to a best-of-three full matches played on three separate dates. The Chicago Sting defeated the New York Cosmos in Soccer Bowl '81 on September 26 to win the championship.

When Major League Baseball players went on strike on June 12, there was speculation that other sports, especially soccer, would see larger crowds. However, the 157 NASL matches played during the baseball work stoppage (which ended August 9) drew an average attendance of only 13,419, less than the full-season average of 14,084.

== Changes from the previous season ==
=== New teams ===
- None

=== Teams folding ===
- Houston Hurricane
- Rochester Lancers
- Washington Diplomats

=== Teams moving ===
- Memphis Rogues to Calgary Boomers
- Detroit Express to Washington Diplomats
- New England Tea Men to Jacksonville Tea Men
- Philadelphia Fury to Montreal Manic

=== Name changes ===
- None

== Map of clubs ==
Eastern Division Central Division Southern Division Northwest Division Western Division

== Regular season ==
W = Wins, L = Losses, GF = Goals For, GA = Goals Against, PT= point system

6 points for a win in regulation and overtime, 4 point for a shootout win, 0 points for a loss, 1 bonus point for each regulation goal scored, up to three per game.

-Premiers (most points). -Other playoff teams.

| Eastern Division | W | L | GF | GA | PT |
|---|---|---|---|---|---|
| New York Cosmos | 23 | 9 | 80 | 49 | 200 |
| Montreal Manic | 15 | 17 | 63 | 57 | 141 |
| Washington Diplomats | 15 | 17 | 59 | 58 | 135 |
| Toronto Blizzard | 7 | 25 | 39 | 82 | 77 |

| Southern Division | W | L | GF | GA | PT |
|---|---|---|---|---|---|
| Atlanta Chiefs | 17 | 15 | 62 | 60 | 151 |
| Fort Lauderdale Strikers | 18 | 14 | 54 | 46 | 144 |
| Jacksonville Tea Men | 18 | 14 | 51 | 46 | 141 |
| Tampa Bay Rowdies | 15 | 17 | 63 | 64 | 139 |

| Central Division | W | L | GF | GA | PT |
|---|---|---|---|---|---|
| Chicago Sting | 23 | 9 | 84 | 50 | 195 |
| Minnesota Kicks | 19 | 13 | 63 | 57 | 163 |
| Tulsa Roughnecks | 17 | 15 | 60 | 49 | 154 |
| Dallas Tornado | 5 | 27 | 27 | 71 | 54 |

| Western Division | W | L | GF | GA | PT |
|---|---|---|---|---|---|
| San Diego Sockers | 21 | 11 | 67 | 49 | 173 |
| Los Angeles Aztecs | 19 | 13 | 53 | 55 | 160 |
| California Surf | 11 | 21 | 60 | 77 | 117 |
| San Jose Earthquakes | 11 | 21 | 44 | 78 | 108 |

| Northwest Division | W | L | GF | GA | PT |
|---|---|---|---|---|---|
| Vancouver Whitecaps | 21 | 11 | 74 | 43 | 186 |
| Calgary Boomers | 17 | 15 | 59 | 54 | 151 |
| Portland Timbers | 17 | 15 | 52 | 49 | 141 |
| Seattle Sounders | 15 | 17 | 60 | 62 | 137 |
| Edmonton Drillers | 12 | 20 | 60 | 79 | 123 |

== NASL All-Stars ==
| First Team | Position | Second Team | Honorable Mention |
|---|---|---|---|
| (Netherlands) Jan van Beveren, Fort Lauderdale | G | (Germany) Hubert Birkenmeier, New York | (Germany) Volkmar Gross, San Diego |
| (Haiti) Frantz Mathieu, Chicago | D | (England) Barry Wallace, Tulsa | (Luxembourg) Nick Rohmann, San Diego |
| (Netherlands) Wim Rijsbergen, New York | D | (England) Kevin Bond, Seattle | (Canada) Robert Iarusci, New York |
| (Germany) Peter Nogly, Edmonton | D | (Socialist Federal Republic of Yugoslavia) Mihalj Keri, Los Angeles | (Jersey) Dave Huson, Chicago |
| (Scotland) John Gorman, Tampa Bay | D | (Republic of Ireland) Pierce O'Leary, Vancouver | (Brazil) Carlos Alberto, California |
| (Germany) Arno Steffenhagen, Chicago | M | (England) Alan Hudson, Seattle | (United States) Juli Veee, San Diego |
| (Socialist Federal Republic of Yugoslavia) Vladislav Bogićević, New York | M | (Northern Ireland) George Best, San Jose | (South Africa) Jomo Sono, Toronto |
| (Peru) Teófilo Cubillas, Fort Lauderdale | M | (Scotland) Peter Lorimer, Vancouver | (England) Duncan McKenzie, Tulsa |
| (England) Brian Kidd, Atlanta | F | (Germany) Karl-Heinz Granitza, Chicago | (Canada) Mike Stojanović, San Diego |
| (England) Gordon Hill, Montreal | F | (Paraguay) Roberto Cabañas, New York | (Argentina) Pato Margetic, Chicago |
| (Italy) Giorgio Chinaglia, New York | F | (Germany) Franz Gerber, Calgary | (England) Alan Green, Jacksonville • (South Africa) Steve Wegerle, New York |

== Playoffs ==
15 teams qualified for the playoffs – each first and second-place team across the divisions plus the five next best teams. Division winners were seeded 1 through 5, the second-place teams were seeded 6 through 10, and the last five teams were seeded 11 through 15 regardless of division placing. The top seed received a bye, and the remaining 14 teams paired off to play the first round. Series winners would be reseeded by season point total after each round.

The 'best of two' format used from 1978 to 1980 was discarded for a more straightforward best of three games format in the first three rounds.

=== Bracket ===
First Round (Best-of-3)
3 | Vancouver | 0
14 | Tampa Bay | 2
6 | Minnesota | 2
11 | Tulsa | 0
8 | Calgary | 0
9 | Fort Lauderdale | 2
2 | Chicago | 2
15 | Seattle | 1
7 | Los Angeles | 1
10 | Montreal | 2
4 | San Diego | 2
13 | Portland | 1
5 | Atlanta | 0
12 | Jacksonville | 2

Quarterfinals (Best-of-3)
1 | New York | 2
14 | Tampa Bay | 1
6 | Minnesota | 0
9 | Fort Lauderdale | 2
2 | Chicago | 2
10 | Montreal | 1
4 | San Diego | 2
12 | Jacksonville | 1

Semifinals (Best-of-3)
1 | New York | 2
9 | Fort Lauderdale | 0
2 | Chicago | 2
4 | San Diego | 1

Soccer Bowl '81 (Single match)
1 | New York | 0
2 | Chicago | 1

=== First round ===
| Lower seed | | Higher seed | Game 1 | Game 2 | Game 3 | (higher seed hosts Games 2 and 3) |
| Tulsa Roughnecks | - | Minnesota Kicks | 1–3 | 0–1 (SO, 4–5) | x | August 22 • Skelly Stadium • 16,205; August 26 • Metropolitan Stadium • 10,722 |
| Portland Timbers | - | San Diego Sockers | 2–1 | 1–5 | 0–2 | August 22 • Civic Stadium • 16,003; August 26 • Jack Murphy Stadium • 12,039; August 30 • Jack Murphy Stadium • 15,244 |
| Jacksonville Tea Men | - | Atlanta Chiefs | 3–2 (OT) | 2–1 | x | August 23 • Gator Bowl • 9,287; August 25 • Atlanta–Fulton County Stadium • 6,572 |
| Fort Lauderdale Strikers | - | Calgary Boomers | 3–1 | #2–0 | x | August 23 • Lockhart Stadium • 12,196 #August 26 • Lockhart Stadium • 11,494 |
| Tampa Bay Rowdies | - | Vancouver Whitecaps | 4–1 | 1–0 | x | August 23 • Tampa Stadium • 21,192; August 26 • Empire Stadium • 28,896 |
| Seattle Sounders | - | Chicago Sting | 2–3 | *2–0 | 2–3 | August 23 • Comiskey Park • 14,643; *August 26 • Kingdome • 15,176; August 30 • Wrigley Field • 24,080 |
| Montreal Manic | - | Los Angeles Aztecs | 5–3 | 2–3 | 2–1 (OT) | August 24 • Olympic Stadium • 46,682; August 27 • Los Angeles Memorial Coliseum • 7,529; August 30 • Los Angeles Memorial Coliseum • 8,812 |
| (first round bye) | | New York Cosmos | • | • | • | • |

#Due to a scheduling conflict between the Calgary Boomers and the Billy Graham Crusade, the Fort Lauderdale Strikers hosted both Games 1 and 2 (instead of Game 1 only), there-by gaining home field advantage even though they were the lower seed.

*Seattle Sounders hosted Game 2 (instead of Game 1) due to a scheduling conflict with the Mariners baseball club.

=== Quarterfinals ===
| Lower seed | | Higher seed | Game 1 | Game 2 | Game 3 | (higher seed hosts Games 2 and 3) |
| Tampa Bay Rowdies | - | New York Cosmos | 3–6 | 3–2 (SO, 4–2) | 0–2 | September 2 • Tampa Stadium • 29,224; September 5 • Giants Stadium • 38,691; September 9 • Giants Stadium • 33,754 |
| Montreal Manic | - | Chicago Sting | 3–2 | 2–4 | 2–4 | September 2 • Olympic Stadium • 58,542; September 5 • Wrigley Field • 24,648; September 10 • Comiskey Park • 27,489 |
| Fort Lauderdale Strikers | - | Minnesota Kicks | 3–1 | 3–0 | x | September 2 • Lockhart Stadium • 11,918; September 6 • Memorial Stadium • 10,278 |
| Jacksonville Tea Men | - | San Diego Sockers | 2–1 (OT) | 1–2 | 1–3 | September 2 • Gator Bowl • 12,252; September 6 • Jack Murphy Stadium • 14,428; September 9 • Jack Murphy Stadium • 14,015 |

=== Semifinals ===
| Lower seed | | Higher seed | Game 1 | Game 2 | Game 3 | (higher seed hosts Games 2 and 3) |
| Fort Lauderdale Strikers | - | New York Cosmos | 3–4 | 1–4 | x | September 12 • Lockhart Stadium • 18,814; September 16 • Giants Stadium • 31,172 |
| San Diego Sockers | - | Chicago Sting | 2–1 | 1–2 | 0–1 (SO, 2–3) | September 12 • Jack Murphy Stadium • 18,192; September 16 • Comiskey Park • 21,760; September 21 • Comiskey Park • 39,623 |

=== Soccer Bowl '81 ===
September 26
8:00 pm EDT

| Chicago Sting | 1–0 (SO) | New York Cosmos |
|---|---|---|
| | Report |
Penalties
| Margetic (penalty missed); Spalding (penalty missed); Peter (penalty missed); Granitza (penalty scored); Glenn (penalty scored) | 2–1 | (penalty missed) Seninho; (penalty missed) Chinaglia; (penalty scored) Bogićević; (penalty missed) Buljan; (penalty missed) Iarusci |

Exhibition Stadium, Toronto (ON)
Attendance: 36,971
Referee: Dante Maglio (Canada)

1981 NASL Champions: Chicago Sting

*From 1977 through 1984 the NASL had a variation of the penalty shoot-out procedure for tied matches. The shoot-out started 35 yards from the goal and allowed the player 5 seconds to attempt a shot. The player could make as many moves as he wanted in a breakaway situation within the time frame. Even though this particular match was a scoreless tie after overtime, NASL procedure also called for the box score to show an additional "goal" given to the winning team.

== Post season awards ==
- Most Valuable Player: (Italy) Giorgio Chinaglia, New York
- Coach of the year: (United States) Willy Roy, Chicago
- Rookie of the year: (United States) Joe Morrone, Jr., Tulsa
- North American Player of the Year: (Canada) Mike Stojanović, San Diego

== Attendances ==
| Club | Games | Total | Average |
|---|---|---|---|
| New York Cosmos | 16 | 557,713 | 34,857 |
| Montreal Manic | 16 | 379,263 | 23,704 |
| Vancouver Whitecaps | 16 | 371,783 | 23,236 |
| Tampa Bay Rowdies | 16 | 370,593 | 23,162 |
| Seattle Sounders | 16 | 291,585 | 18,224 |
| Tulsa Roughnecks | 16 | 275,012 | 17,188 |
| Minnesota Kicks | 16 | 265,672 | 16,605 |
| San Diego Sockers | 16 | 236,824 | 14,802 |
| Ft. Lauderdale Strikers | 16 | 213,178 | 13,324 |
| Chicago Sting | 16 | 206,227 | 12,889 |
| San Jose Earthquakes | 16 | 195,876 | 12,242 |
| Washington Diplomats | 16 | 193,702 | 12,106 |
| Edmonton Drillers | 16 | 170,109 | 10,632 |
| Portland Timbers | 16 | 168,259 | 10,516 |
| Calgary Boomers | 16 | 168,019 | 10,501 |
| Jacksonville Tea Men | 16 | 152,111 | 9,507 |
| California Surf | 16 | 132,777 | 8,299 |
| Toronto Blizzard | 16 | 116,590 | 7,287 |
| Atlanta Chiefs | 16 | 99,022 | 6,189 |
| Los Angeles Aztecs | 16 | 93,031 | 5,814 |
| Dallas Tornado | 16 | 74,716 | 4,670 |
