= Soccer Bowl '81 =

Soccer match

- Event: Soccer Bowl
| Chicago Sting | New York Cosmos |
| 0 | 0 |
- Chicago won 2–1 in a shoot-out
- Date: September 26, 1981
- Venue: Exhibition Stadium, Toronto, Ontario
- Man of the Match: Frantz Mathieu
- Referee: Dante Maglio (Canada)
- Attendance: 36,971

Soccer Bowl '81 was the championship final of the 1981 NASL season, between the Chicago Sting and the New York Cosmos. The match was played on September 26, 1981, at Exhibition Stadium, in Toronto, Ontario. Following regulation and 15 minutes of golden goal overtime, the match remained tied, 0–0. With that, the game moved to a shoot-out. The Sting won the shoot-out, 2–1, and were crowned the 1981 NASL champions. This was Chicago's first NASL title.

== Background ==
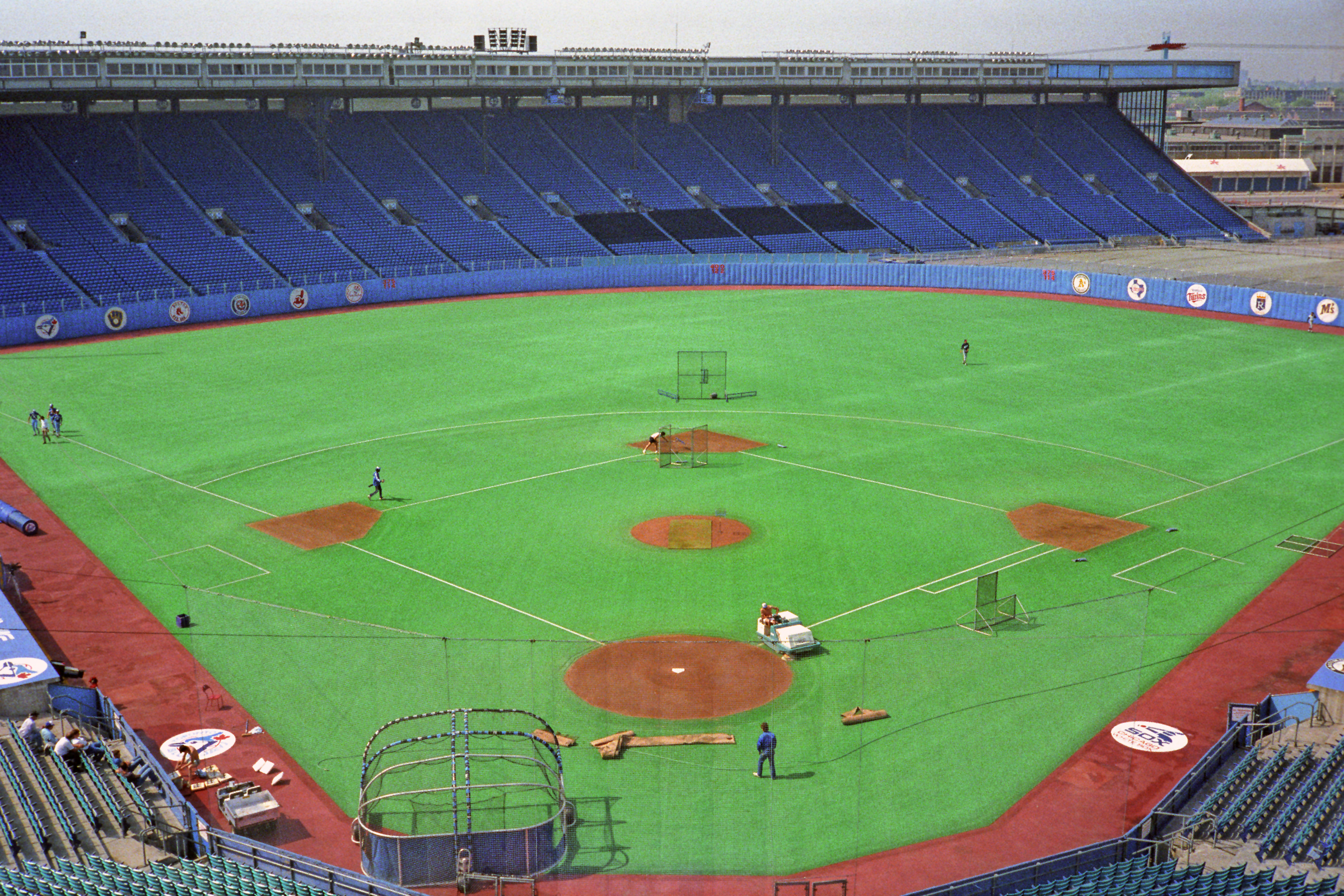
Exhibition Stadium was the venue for Soccer Bowl '81

=== Chicago Sting ===
The Chicago Sting qualified for the playoffs by winning the Central Division with 195 points. Their regular season was highlighted by a sweep of both matches against the New York Cosmos and a perfect 6–0 record in games requiring overtime or a shootout. Although they tied the Cosmos for the best record in the NASL, New York had earned 5 more points and thus the number one seed. In the first round of the playoffs Chicago outlasted the Seattle Sounders, two games to one. 24,080 fans showed up for the decisive third game of the series at Comiskey Park on August 30. Three days later game one of the quarterfinals match up with the Montreal Manic, saw a capacity crowd of 58,542 pack Montreal's Olympic Stadium and cheer the home side to a stirring, 3–2, comeback victory over the Sting. Not to be outdone, the Sting posted consecutive, 4–2, home victories to win the series. In the semifinals the Sting again dropped the first game on the road, this time to San Diego. The Sting battled back to level the series at one game apiece, and force yet another winner-take-all game three. On September 21, the largest home crowd in Sting history (39,623), sat through a nearly constant rain and 50 degree temperatures, in the hopes of witnessing local soccer history. In a foreshadowing of what lay ahead for the Sting, the two teams battled through 90 minutes of regulation and 15 minutes of sudden death overtime with neither one able to score. The game moved on to a tiebreaker shootout. The Sockers had ousted the Sting from the previous year's playoffs via a shootout, but Chicago prevailed this time, 3–2, when Frantz Mathieu converted his try in the sixth round, sending the Sting to their first ever Soccer Bowl.

=== New York Cosmos ===
The New York Cosmos qualified for the playoffs by winning the Eastern Division with 200 points. Even though Chicago had tied them for the best record in the NASL, the Cosmos earned 5 more points and therefore, the number one playoff seed. This granted New York a first round bye and a minimum of at least two fewer games to play than every other team in the playoffs they would face. In the quarterfinals the Cosmos were matched against their Soccer Bowl '78 opponent, the Tampa Bay Rowdies. After game one on September 2, it looked as if New York would have no trouble at all with their long-time rivals, as they hammered the home side, 6–3, in front of 29,224 disappointed fans at Tampa Stadium. Former Rowdies' star Steve Wegerle scored twice in the match for the visitors. Although Tampa Bay barely qualified for the playoffs and had never previously won a game at Giants Stadium, they nevertheless beat the odds on September 5. The Rowdies won game two, 3–2, by virtue of a 4–2 shootout as 38,691 looked on, thus forcing the Cosmos into playing a winner-take-all match a few days later. On September 9, New York finally dispatched the Rowdies for good in a very physical game three, by the score of 2–0 to advance to the next round. In the semifinals the Cosmos faced their Soccer Bowl '80 adversary, the Fort Lauderdale Strikers, with the opening match at Lockhart Stadium. A capacity crowd of 18,814 saw New York outlast the Strikers, 4–3. League MVP Giorgio Chinaglia had two goals on the night. Four nights later the Cosmos closed out their second Florida-based foe in as many rounds with a 4–1 win at Giants Stadium before 31,172. The victory propelled the Cosmos into their fourth Soccer Bowl in five years and was highlighted by a Chinaglia hat trick.

== Match details ==
September 26
8:00 p.m. (EDT)

| Chicago Sting | 0–0 (a.e.t.) | New York Cosmos |
Penalties
| Margetic (penalty missed); Spalding (penalty missed); Peter (penalty missed); Granitza (penalty scored); Glenn (penalty scored) | 2–1 | (penalty missed) Seninho; (penalty missed) Chinaglia; (penalty scored) Bogićević; (penalty missed) Buljan; (penalty missed) Iarusci |

Exhibition Stadium, Toronto
Attendance: 36,971
Referee: Dante Maglio(Canada)

| Chicago Sting | NY Cosmos |

| GK | 22 | (Germany) Dieter Ferner |
| DF | 16 | (Jersey) Dave Huson | | (substituted off) 94:55' |
| DF | 7 | (Haiti) Frantz Mathieu |
| DF | 5 | (Germany) Paul Hahn |
| DF | 4 | (United States) Derek Spalding |
| MF | 14 | (Germany) Ingo Peter |
| MF | 9 | (United States) Charlie Fajkus | | (substituted off) 90:00' |
| MF | 8 | (United States) Rudy Glenn | (yellow card) 58:52' |
| FW | 6 | (Germany) Arno Steffenhagen |
| FW | 10 | (Argentina) Pato Margetic |
| FW | 12 | (Germany) Karl-Heinz Granitza (c) |
Substitutes:
| MF | 23 | (United States) Bret Hall | | (substituted on) 90:00' |
| MF | 3 | (United States) Greg Ryan | | (substituted on) 94:55' |
| GK | 20 | (United States) Paul Coffee |
Manager:
(United States) Willy Roy

| GK | 1 | (Germany) Hubert Birkenmeier |
| DF | 2 | (Iran) Andranik Eskandarian |
| DF | 4 | (United States) Jeff Durgan |
| DF | 3 | (Canada) Robert Iarusci | (yellow card) 11:05' |
| DF | 15 | (Netherlands) Wim Rijsbergen | (yellow card) 58:52' | (substituted off) 58:52' |
| MF | 8 | (Socialist Federal Republic of Yugoslavia) Vladislav Bogićević |
| MF | 13 | (Netherlands) Johan Neeskens |
| MF | 22 | (Socialist Federal Republic of Yugoslavia) Ivan Buljan |
| FW | 11 | (Portugal) Seninho |
| FW | 14 | (South Africa) Steve Wegerle | | (substituted off) 90:00' |
| FW | 9 | (Italy) Giorgio Chinaglia (c) |
Substitutes:
| MF | 7 | (Paraguay) Julio César Romero | | (substituted on) 58:52' |
| MF | 28 | (United States) Chico Borja | | (substituted on) 90:00' |
| GK | 21 | (United States) David Brcic |
Manager:
(Germany) Hennes Weisweiler

1981 NASL Champions: Chicago Sting

Soccer Bowl MVP:
Frantz Mathieu (Chicago)
Assistant referees:
Robert Donohue
Derek Davis

Television: ABC (tape delayed broadcast)
Announcers: Verne Lundquist, Paul Gardner

== Match statistics ==
First Half
| Statistic | Chicago | New York |
|---|---|---|
| Goals scored | 0 | 0 |
| Total shots | 6 | 7 |
| Shots on target | 4 | 3 |
| Saves | 3 | 4 |
| Corner kicks | 5 | 1 |
| Fouls | 9 | 10 |
| Offsides | 1 | 0 |
| Yellow cards | 0 | 1 |
| Red cards | 0 | 0 |

Overtime
| Statistic | Chicago | New York |
|---|---|---|
| Goals scored | 0 | 0 |
| Total shots | 2 | 5 |
| Shots on target | - | - |
| Saves | - | - |
| Corner kicks | 1 | 2 |
| Fouls | 6 | 3 |
| Offsides | 0 | 0 |
| Yellow cards | 0 | 0 |
| Red cards | 0 | 0 |

Overall Totals
| Statistic | Chicago | New York |
|---|---|---|
| Goals scored | 0 | 0 |
| Total shots | 17 | 19 |
| Shots on target | 9 | 8 |
| Saves | 8 | 9 |
| Corner kicks | 11 | 4 |
| Fouls | 30 | 19 |
| Offsides | 2 | 1 |
| Yellow cards | 1 | 2 |
| Red cards | 0 | 0 |

*From 1977 through 1984 the NASL had a variation of the penalty shoot-out procedure for tied matches. The shoot-out started 35 yards from the goal and allowed the player 5 seconds to attempt a shot. The player could make as many moves as he wanted in a breakaway situation within the time frame. Even though this particular match was a goalless draw after extra time, NASL procedure also called for the box score to show an additional "goal" given to the winning side of a shoot-out.

== See also ==
- 1981 North American Soccer League season
