= Soccer Bowl Series '84 =

Soccer match

Soccer Bowl '84
Soccer Bowl Series '84
- Event: Soccer Bowl
Chicago Sting	Toronto Blizzard
2	0
- (on best-of-three series)

Game 1
Chicago Sting	Toronto Blizzard
2	1
- Date: October 1, 1984
- Venue: Comiskey Park, Chicago, Illinois
- Man of the Match: Manuel Rojas
- Referee: David Socha (United States)
- Attendance: 8,352

Game 2
Toronto Blizzard	Chicago Sting
2	3
- Date: October 3, 1984
- Venue: Varsity Stadium, Toronto, Ontario
- Man of the Match: Pato Margetic
- Referee: Bill Maxwell (United States)
- Attendance: 16,842

Soccer Bowl Series '84, also known as Soccer Bowl '84, was the championship series of the 1984 NASL season, and the last championship of the original NASL. In a departure from previous years, it was a best-of-three series between the Chicago Sting and the Toronto Blizzard as opposed to a single-game championship. The first game of the series was held on Monday, October 1 at Comiskey Park, in Chicago, Illinois; the Sting won it, 2–1. The second game was played at Varsity Stadium, in Toronto, Ontario on October 3. Chicago won again, this time by a score of 3–2, to sweep the series and claim its second North American championship.

== Background ==
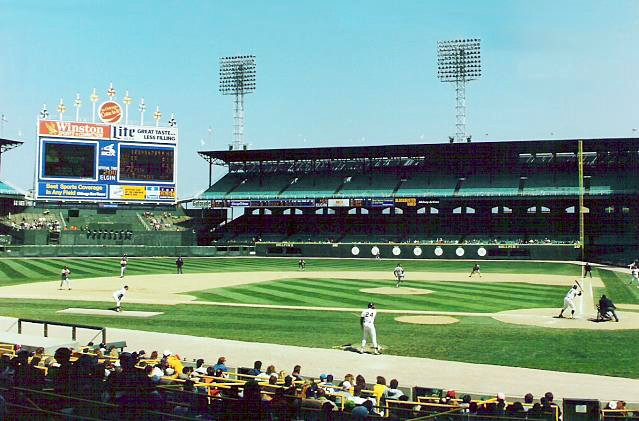
Comiskey Park was one of the sites for Soccer Bowl '84

=== Chicago Sting ===
The Chicago Sting finished the regular season with a 13–11 record, while the Blizzard went 14–10. However, due to the NASL's point system, the Sting were crowned the Eastern Division champions, and also won the league's regular season title with 120 points. This ensured that they would retain home field advantage throughout the playoffs. Since all series were best-of-three ties, that meant a Game 3 if necessary, would be in Chicago. The Sting defeated the Vancouver Whitecaps in their semi-finals series, two games to one.

=== Toronto Blizzard ===
The Toronto Blizzard qualified for the playoffs as runners-up in the Eastern Division and faced the San Diego Sockers in the other semi-final series. The Blizzard earned a return trip to the finals with a two–game sweep of the Western Division champion Sockers. Games 1 and 3 of the Soccer Bowl Series were scheduled to be played at Comiskey Park, while game 2 was set for Toronto's Varsity Stadium.

Sportsvision televised the series in the Chicago area; this coverage was simulcast on the then-new TSN (which had started up a month earlier) cable channel in Canada.

== Series summary ==
Champion	Runner-up	Game 1	Venue	Game 2	Venue	Res.
Chicago Sting	Toronto Blizzard	2–1	Comiskey Park	3–2	Varsity Stadium	2–0 (Note: Result on games won, as a best-of-three series)

== Match details ==
=== Game 1 ===
October 1

Chicago Sting	2–1	Toronto Blizzard
Margetic 50'; Rojas 85'	Report	Wilson 15'

Comiskey Park, Chicago
Attendance: 8,352
Referee: David Socha (United States)

Chicago Sting	Toronto Blizzard

GK	1	(Portuguese Mozambique) Victor Nogueira
DF	5	(United States) Hayden Knight	(yellow card) 77:40'
DF	7	(Canada) Victor Kodelja	(yellow card) 53:05'
DF	6	(Jersey) Dave Huson
MF	9	(Chile) Manny Rojas
MF	4	(Canada) Gerry Gray
MF	8	(United States) Rudy Glenn	(yellow card) 33:18'
MF	11	(United States) Mark Simanton	(yellow card) 86:33'
FW	12	(Germany) Karl-Heinz Granitza (c)	(yellow card) 40:52'
FW	10	(Argentina) Pato Margetic
FW	3	(Portugal) Seninho	(yellow card) 88:39'
Substitutes:
FW	16	(United States) Robert Meschbach
FW	20	(United States) Elvis Comrie
DF	28	(Haiti) Frantz Mathieu
Manager:
(United States) Willy Roy			(yellow card) 40:52'

GK	1	(United States) Paul Hammond
DF	24	(Canada) Colin Miller
DF	2	(Canada) Bruce Wilson (c)
DF	17	(United States) Derek Spalding	(yellow card) 76:43'
DF	4	(Sweden) Conny Karlsson	(yellow card) 75:19'
MF	10	(Canada) Cliff Calvert	(yellow card) 33:05'
MF	16	(Canada) Randy Ragan	(yellow card) 35:11'
MF	12	(Canada) Pasquale de Luca
MF	8	(South Africa) Ace Ntsoelengoe
FW	19	(England) David Byrne	(yellow card) 88:14'
FW	11	(Italy) Roberto Bettega	(substituted off) 81'
Substitutes:
MF	9	(South Africa) John Paskin
MF	20	(Canada) Charlie Falzon	(substituted in) 81'
Manager:
(England) Bob Houghton

Assistant referees:
Ulrich Strom
John Pozadzides

=== Game 2 ===
October 3, 1984

Toronto Blizzard	2–3	Chicago Sting
Paskin 71'; Bettega 73'	Report 1 Report 2	Simanton 17'; Margetic 68', 82'

Varsity Stadium, Toronto
Attendance: 16,842
Referee: Bill Maxwell (United States)

Toronto Blizzard	Chicago Sting

GK	1	(United States) Paul Hammond
DF	2	(Canada) Bruce Wilson (c)
DF	17	(United States) Derek Spalding
DF	4	(Sweden) Conny Karlsson
DF	10	(Canada) Cliff Calvert
MF	16	(Canada) Randy Ragan
MF	5	(Northern Ireland) Jimmy Nicholl	(substituted off) 45'
MF	12	(Canada) Pasquale de Luca	(substituted off) 71'
MF	8	(South Africa) Ace Ntsoelengoe	(yellow card) 12:27'
FW	19	(England) David Byrne
FW	11	(Italy) Roberto Bettega
Substitutes:
MF	9	(South Africa) John Paskin	(substituted in) 71'
MF	20	(Canada) Charlie Falzon	(substituted in) 45'
Manager:
(England) Bob Houghton

GK	1	(Portuguese Mozambique) Victor Nogueira
DF	5	(United States) Hayden Knight
DF	7	(Canada) Victor Kodelja
DF	6	(Jersey) Dave Huson	(substituted off) 73'
MF	9	(Chile) Manny Rojas
MF	4	(Canada) Gerry Gray
MF	8	(United States) Rudy Glenn	(substituted off) 80'
MF	11	(United States) Mark Simanton
FW	12	(Germany) Karl-Heinz Granitza (c)
FW	10	(Argentina) Pato Margetic
FW	3	(Portugal) Seninho
Substitutes:
FW	16	(United States) Robert Meschbach	(substituted in) 80'
FW	20	(United States) Elvis Comrie
DF	28	(Haiti) Frantz Mathieu	(substituted in) 73'
Manager:
(United States) Willy Roy

1984 NASL Champions: Chicago Sting

Series MVP:
Pato Margetic (Chicago)
Assistant referees:
Dilvo DiPlacido
Michael Saunders

== Championship Statistics ==
Game 1
Statistic	Chicago	Toronto
Goals scored	2	1
Total shots	16	12
Shots on target	6	9
Saves	8	4
Corner kicks	6	5
Fouls	21	26
Offsides	8	3
Yellow cards	7	5
Red cards	0	0

Game 2
Statistic	Chicago	Toronto
Goals scored	3	2
Total shots	12	20
Shots on target	7	9
Saves	7	4
Corner kicks	5	9
Fouls	12	20
Offsides	6	2
Yellow cards	0	1
Red cards	0	0

== Post-match controversy ==
Earlier in the year Sting ownership had requested a one-year leave of absence from the NASL, and were denied. With only a few games remaining in the season, Sting chairman Lee Stern, believing that indoor soccer represented the future of the sport, announced that 1984 would be the Chicago Sting's last in the NASL. They, along with three other teams had been granted full admittance to the MISL. The Blizzard, who were run by former Sting president Clive Toye, were one of the franchises fighting to keep the NASL going.

In the immediate aftermath of Chicago's title clinching victory, Toye's actions and subsequent words were unsporting in nature. He refused to honor the long-standing tradition of entering the winning side's locker room to congratulate the victors. He then followed that up by taking verbal jabs at both Willy Roy and Karl-Heinz Granitza to reporters, by referring to them as "cheats" and the Sting as "unworthy champions" among other things. While in the midst of Chicago's post match celebration, not surprisingly, Granitza responded in kind. In the end the pettiness and lack of sportsmanship by both men mattered little, as Chicago left with the league's final trophy. The following spring, with Toye as the NASL's interim president, the league would cease operations.

== See also ==
- 1984 North American Soccer League season
