= Sports in Chicago =

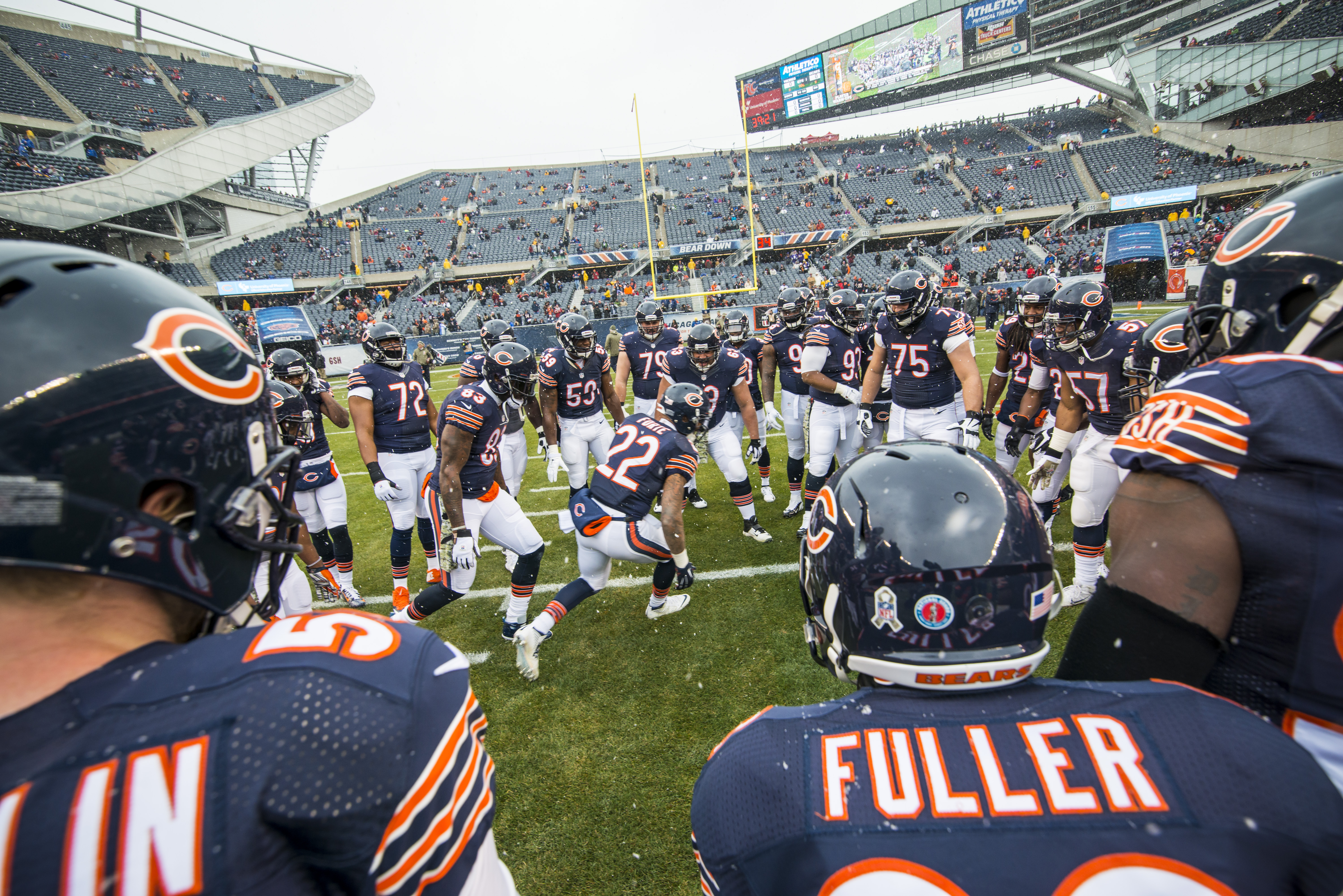
Chicago Bears players before a November 2014 game at Soldier Field

Sports in Chicago include many professional sports teams. Chicago is one of eleven U.S. cities to have teams from the five major professional sports leagues in the United States and Canada. Chicago has been named as the "Best Sports City" by Sporting News three times: 1993, 2006, and 2010.

Chicago was a candidate city for the 2016 Summer Olympics but lost to Rio de Janeiro. Chicago also hosted the 1959 Pan American Games, as well as the 2006 Gay Games. Chicago hosted the inaugural 1968 Special Olympics Summer World Games as well as its second games in 1970. Chicago also was the host of the 2017 Warrior Games.

== Professional teams ==
The following is a list of active, professional major-league Chicago sports teams, ranked by attendance:

| Club | League | Sport | Venue | Attendance | Founded | Championships | Last Championship |
|---|---|---|---|---|---|---|---|
| Chicago Bears | NFL | Football | Soldier Field | 61,142 | 1919 | 1 Super Bowl, 8 prior Championships | 1985 |
| Chicago Cubs | MLB | Baseball | Wrigley Field | 41,649 | 1870 | 3 World Series, 6 prior championships | 2016 |
| Chicago White Sox | MLB | Baseball | Rate Field | 40,625 | 1900 | 3 World Series, 1 prior championship | 2005 |
| Chicago Blackhawks | NHL | Ice hockey | United Center | 21,653 | 1926 | 6 Stanley Cups | 2015 |
| Chicago Bulls | NBA | Basketball | United Center | 20,776 | 1966 | 6 NBA Championships | 1998 |
| Chicago Fire FC | MLS | Soccer | Soldier Field | 14,806 | 1997 | 1 MLS Cup, 1 Supporters Shield, 4 U.S. Open Cup | 2006 |
| Chicago Triplets | BIG3 | Basketball | Allstate Arena | — | 2019 | 1 Big3 Championship | 2019 |
| Chicago Sky | WNBA | Basketball | Wintrust Arena | 6,358 | 2006 | 1 WNBA Championship | 2021 |
| Chicago Stars FC | NWSL | Soccer | Martin Stadium | 5,451 | 2006 | None | N/A |
| Chicago Slice | MLP | Pickleball | None | — | 2022 | 1 Season 2 Premier League Champion, 1 MLP Super Final Championship | 2023 |
| Chicago Bandits | AUSL | Softball | Parkway Bank Sports Complex | 2000 | 2005 (NPF) | 4 Cowles Cups (NPF) | 2016 |
| Chicago Wind | MLTT | Table tennis | Compass Arena | — | 2023 | None | N/A |
| Chicago Tempest | WER | Rugby union | Northwestern Medicine Field | — | 2025 | None | N/A |
| Chicago Hounds | MLR | Rugby union | SeatGeek Stadium | 4,443 | 2022 | 1 MLR Shield | 2026 |

=== American football (NFL) ===
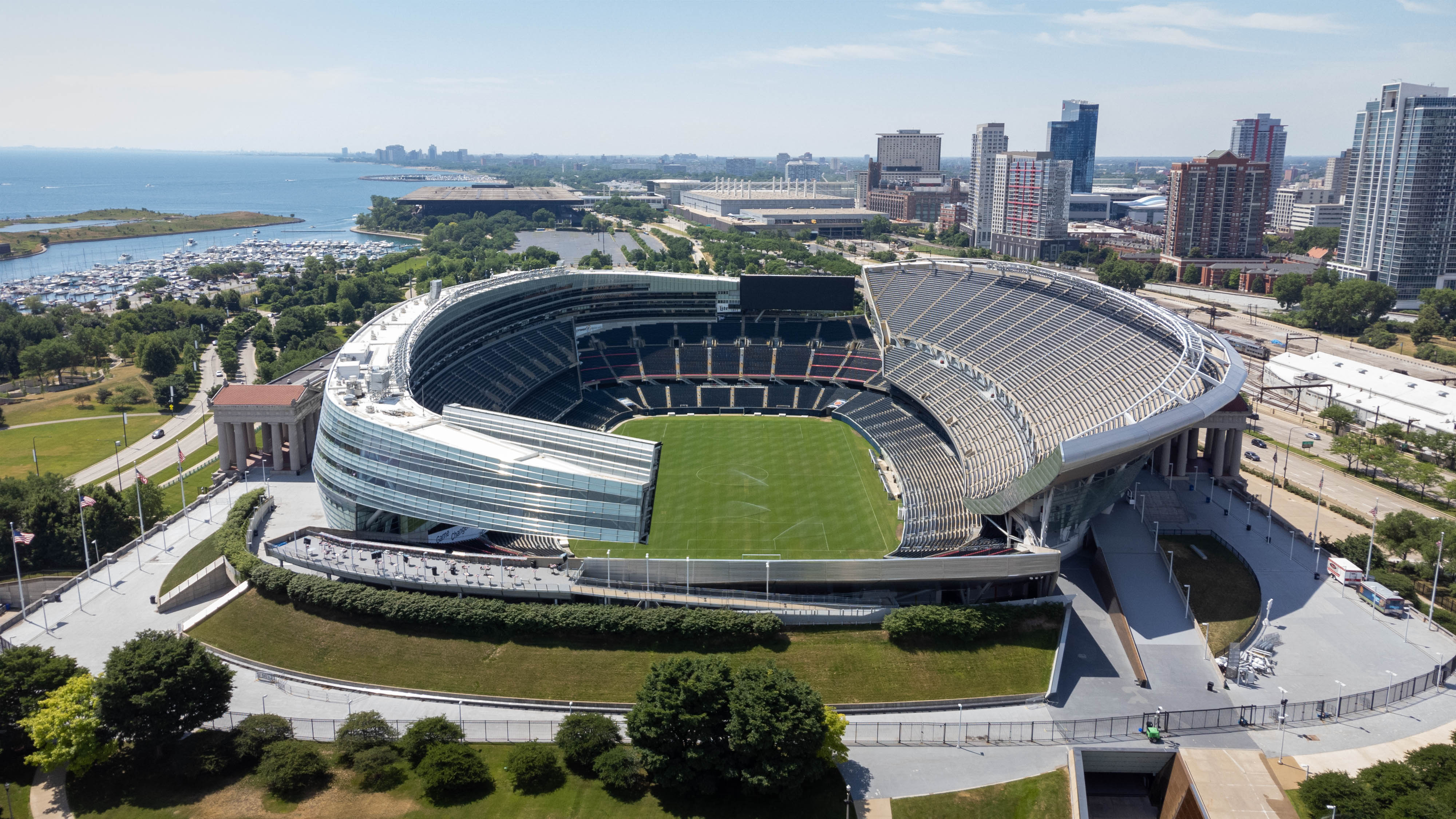
Soldier Field is the home of the Chicago Bears (NFL) and Chicago Fire FC (MLS)

The Chicago Bears of the National Football League (NFL) play at Soldier Field. The Bears' history includes many NFL personalities, including owner George Halas, players Dick Butkus, Gale Sayers, Walter Payton, and coach Mike Ditka. The Bears are one of the original teams of the NFL, founded by Halas in 1919 in Decatur, Illinois. They currently have the most players inducted into the Pro Football Hall of Fame with 26. In 1985, the Bears won Super Bowl XX 46–10 over the New England Patriots. In the 2006 season, the Bears reached Super Bowl XLI, but lost 29–17 to the Indianapolis Colts. They were led by coach Lovie Smith.

The Bears' rivalry with the Green Bay Packers dates back the 1920s, and is one of the most intense in American professional sports. The Bears have other regional and divisional rivalries with the Minnesota Vikings and the Detroit Lions.

The Bears play their home games at Soldier Field, named after "The men and women of the armed forces". It is located next to the shores of Lake Michigan, on DuSable Lake Shore Drive. Soldier Field was an aging stadium and was in dire need of renovation by the end of the 20th century. In 2003, the stadium re-opened after an extensive renovation, which increased the number of luxury boxes and dramatically improved the game day experience for Bears fans. However, because of this renovation, the stadium lost its National Historic Landmark designation on February 17, 2006.

=== Baseball (MLB) ===
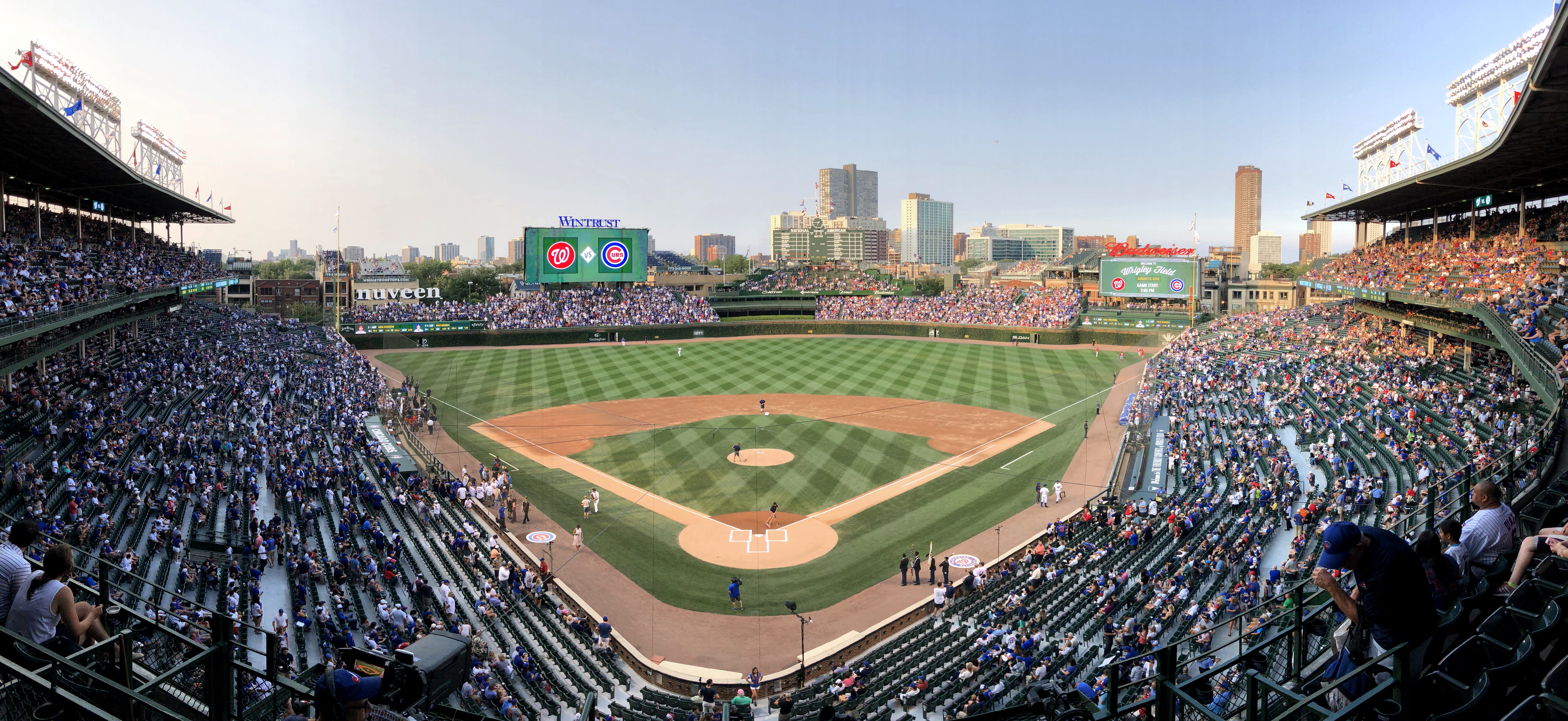
Wrigley Field has been the home to the Chicago Cubs since 1916.

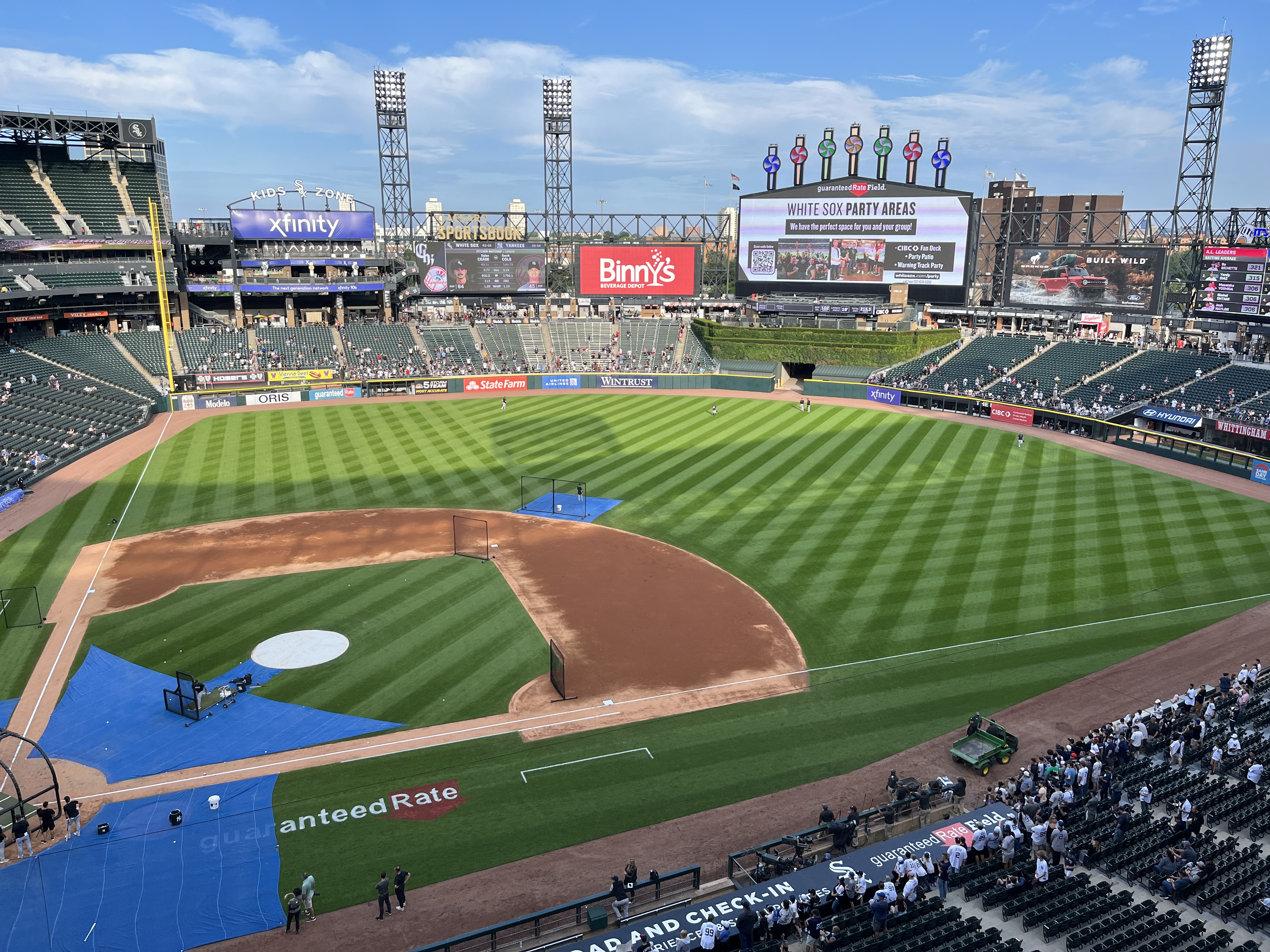
Rate Field has been the home of the Chicago White Sox since 1991.

Chicago is one of three metro areas in the United States that has two Major League Baseball (MLB) teams, the others being Los Angeles and New York City. Of these, only Chicago and New York City have both teams in the city limits. Chicago is the only city that has had more than one MLB team every year since the founding of the American League in 1901 (New York City hosted one team between 1958 and 1962, and Los Angeles has only done so since 1961). The Chicago Cubs are members of the National League (NL), while the Chicago White Sox are members of the American League (AL).

The Cubs play in Wrigley Field in the North side neighborhood of Wrigleyville. The Cubs are the oldest Major League Baseball team to have never changed their city, one of nine out of the sixteen teams to predate expansion that have not changed cities. They have played in Chicago since 1871, and continuously so since 1874 due to the Great Chicago Fire. The White Sox play in Rate Field in the South Side neighborhood of Armour Square. They have played in Chicago since the formation of the American League in 1901.

The Cubs' rivalry with the St. Louis Cardinals is one of the most bitter in North American professional sports. The Cubs are the oldest team to play continuously in the same city since the formation of the National League in 1876. They have played more games, have more wins and scored more runs than any other team in Major League baseball since 1876. They have won three World Series titles (1907, 1908, 2016) and are fourth among National League teams with 17 NL pennants. In 2016, the Cubs broke the two longest droughts in professional sports: 1) they won their sport's title for the first time since 1908, a drought of 108 years, and 2) participated in a World Series for the first time since 1945, a drought of 71 years.

The White Sox have played on the South Side continuously since 1901, with all three of their home fields throughout the years being within mere blocks of one another. They have won three World Series titles (1906, 1917, 2005) and six American League pennants, including the first in 1901. The Sox are fifth in the American League in all-time wins, and sixth in pennants.

=== Basketball (NBA, WNBA) ===
The Chicago Bulls of the National Basketball Association (NBA) is a professional basketball team. Michael Jordan and Scottie Pippen led the Bulls to six NBA championships in two "threepeats" from 1991 to 1993 and again from 1996 to 1998. The new generation of Bulls, known as "The Baby Bulls", emerged in 2005. In 2007, they swept the defending champs, the Miami Heat. In 2011, led by league MVP Derrick Rose, the Bulls made it to the Eastern Finals, losing to the Miami Heat.

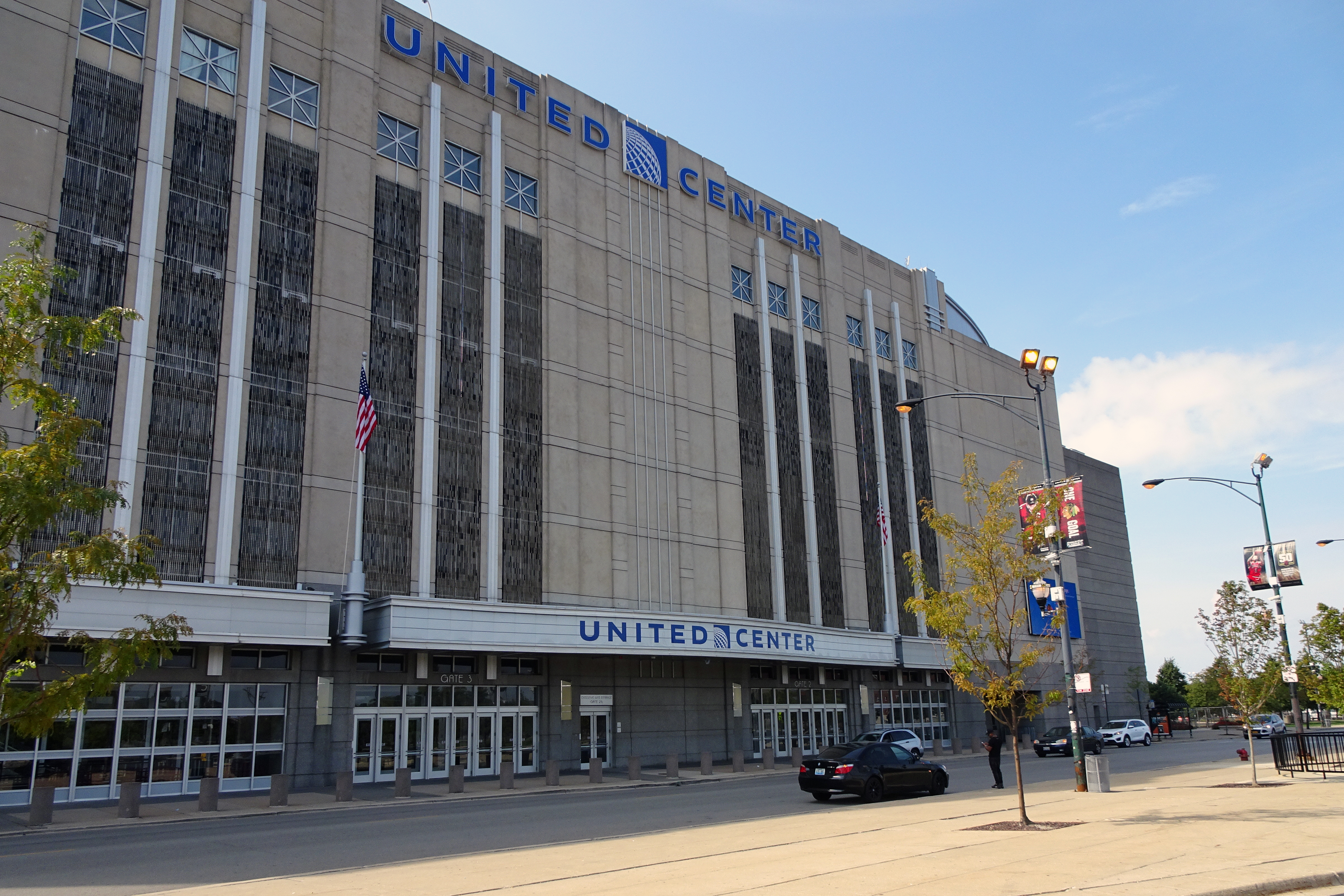
The United Center is the home of the NBA's Chicago Bulls and NHL's Chicago Blackhawks

Chicago is home to the Chicago Sky of the Women's National Basketball Association (WNBA). The Chicago Sky won the 2021 WNBA Finals beating the Phoenix Mercury 3–1.

=== Ice hockey (NHL) ===
The Chicago Blackhawks of the National Hockey League (NHL) is the city's professional ice hockey team, and are an Original Six team. The Blackhawks won the Stanley Cup in 1934, 1938, 1961, 2010, 2013, and again in 2015. The Blackhawks receive national attention for the intense rivalries with the Detroit Red Wings, also an Original Six team. Other rivalries include the Vancouver Canucks, St. Louis Blues (former Norris Division rivals), and the Nashville Predators. Some well-known players include: Stan Mikita, Tony Esposito, Bobby Hull, Keith Magnuson, Glenn Hall, Denis Savard, Steve Larmer, Jeremy Roenick, Chris Chelios, Ed Belfour, Patrick Kane, Patrick Sharp, Marián Hossa, Corey Crawford, Jonathan Toews, and Duncan Keith.

=== Soccer (MLS, NWSL) ===
Soccer in Chicago can be traced back to Chicago Sparta. Founded in 1917 by immigrant Czechs, Sparta competed in several leagues during its existence. The club's achievements include: winning the National Soccer League of Chicago; winning 9 titles in Chicago's International League, of which the team was a member 1926–1936; and winning the National Challenge Cup twice. In the 1950s, the Chicago Falcons operated. They won the National Challenge Cup in 1953.

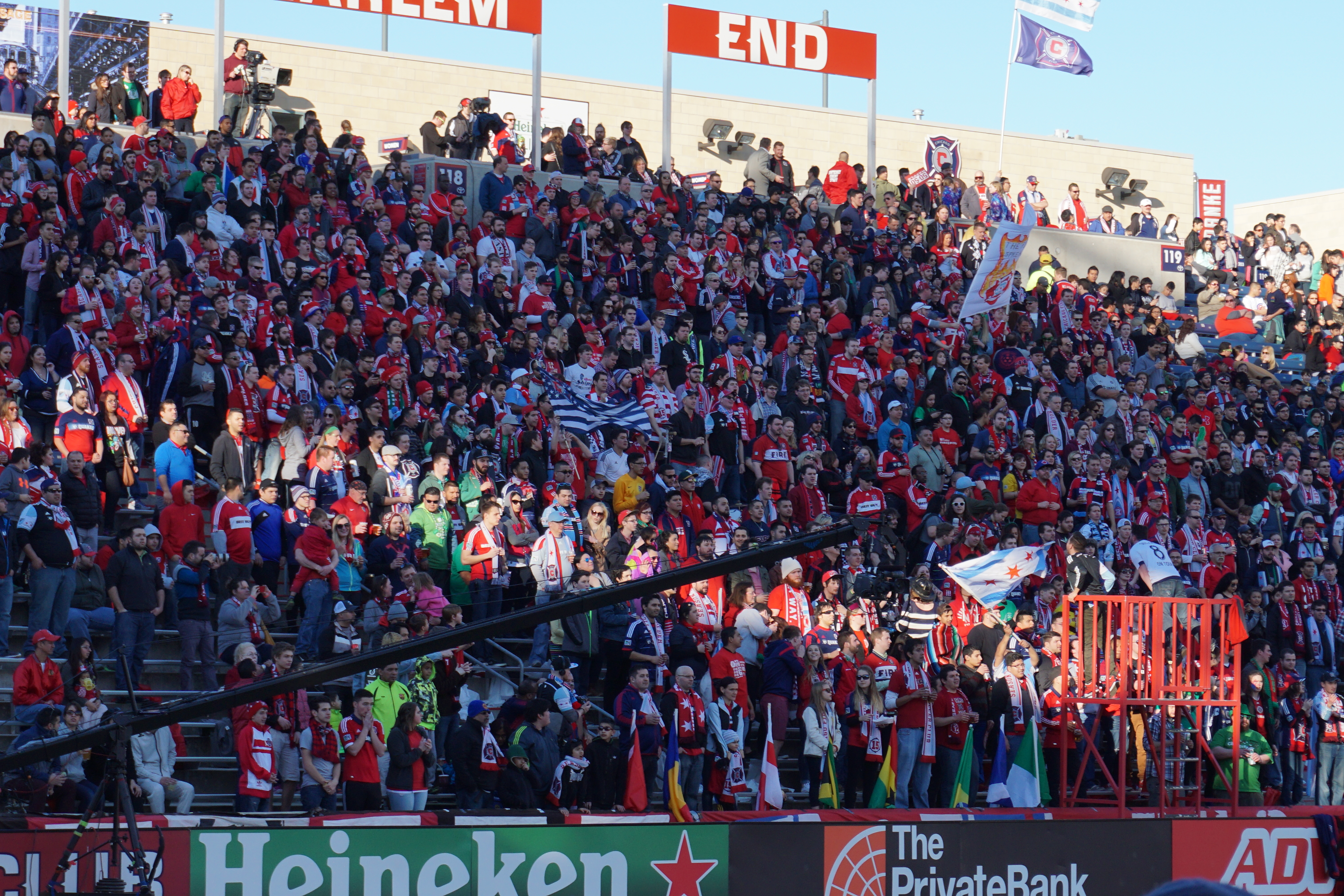
Section 8 during the match between Chicago Fire FC and Vancouver at SeatGeek Stadium in Bridgeview, Illinois

Chicago was once the home of the Chicago Sting who competed in the major professional North American Soccer League (NASL) from 1975 to 1984. They spread their home games at Soldier Field, Wrigley Field, and Comiskey Park. The Sting won the Soccer Bowl twice: 1981 and 1984. They were the only club other than the New York Cosmos to win multiple titles in the NASL One of the club's notable players was German forward Arno Steffenhagen.

Chicago Fire FC, a member of Major League Soccer (MLS), have won one MLS Cup and four U.S. Open Cups since they entered the league in 1998. The Fire won their sole MLS Cup in 1998, their inaugural season, led by head coach Bob Bradley, who later went on to coach the U.S. national soccer team. The Fire played from 2006 to 2019 at SeatGeek Stadium (originally Toyota Park), a soccer-specific stadium located in the Chicago suburb of Bridgeview near Midway Airport. The club currently plays at Soldier Field after finalizing an agreement with the Chicago Park District in September 2019, with plans to move to McDonald's Park in 2028. Some notable former players include Cuauhtémoc Blanco from Mexico, Brian McBride from the U.S., Peter Nowak from Poland, and Bastian Schweinsteiger from Germany – a demonstration of the team's international flavor. The club is named after the Great Chicago Fire of 1871.

Chicago is also home to the Chicago Stars FC (formerly Chicago Red Stars), currently playing in the National Women's Soccer League. The Stars began their second stint at the venue now known as SeatGeek Stadium in 2016, having played there previously as a member of the now-defunct Women's Professional Soccer. After the 2025 season, they left SeatGeek Stadium, moving to Martin Stadium on Northwestern University's main campus in Evanston.

== Major league professional championships ==
=== Chicago Bears (NFL) ===
1 Super Bowl title

- 1985 (XX)

8 NFL championships (pre–Super Bowl)

- 1921
- 1932
- 1933
- 1940
- 1941
- 1943
- 1946
- 1963

=== Chicago Cardinals (NFL) ===
2 NFL championships (pre–Super Bowl)

- 1925
- 1947

=== Chicago Cubs (MLB) ===
3 World Series titles

- 1907
- 1908
- 2016

=== Chicago White Sox (MLB) ===
3 World Series titles

- 1906
- 1917
- 2005

=== Chicago American Giants (NNL) ===
2 Negro World Series titles

- 1926
- 1927

=== Chicago Sting (NASL) ===
2 Soccer Bowl titles

- 1981
- 1984

=== Chicago Fire F.C. (MLS) ===
1 MLS Cup title

- 1998

=== Chicago Bulls (NBA) ===
6 NBA Finals titles

- 1991
- 1992
- 1993
- 1996
- 1997
- 1998

=== Chicago Blackhawks (NHL) ===
6 Stanley Cup titles

- 1934
- 1938
- 1961
- 2010
- 2013
- 2015

=== Chicago Sky (WNBA) ===
1 WNBA Championship

- 2021

== Minor league teams ==
The following is a list of active minor league, semi-pro, and amateur Chicago sports teams, ranked by year of establishment:

| Club | League | Sport | Venue | Location | Established | Championships |
|---|---|---|---|---|---|---|
| Chicago Steel | USHL | Ice Hockey | Fox Valley Ice Arena | Geneva, Illinois | 2000 | 2 |
| Windy City Rollers | WFTDA | Roller derby | Credit Union 1 Arena | Chicago, Illinois | 2004 | 0 |
| Chicago Swans | USAFL | Australian rules football | Waveland Field | Chicago, Illinois | 2008 | 0 |
| Chicago Union | UFA | Ultimate | De La Salle Institute Stadium | Chicago, Illinois | 2013 | 0 |
| Chicago Fury | ABA | Basketball | Bishop Shephard Little Memorial Center | Chicago, Illinois | 2015 | 1 |
| Windy City Bulls | NBA G League | Basketball | Now Arena | Hoffman Estates, Illinois | 2016 | 0 |
| Chicago Fire FC II | MLS Next Pro | Soccer | SeatGeek Stadium | Bridgeview, Illinois | 2021 | 0 |
| Chicago Kingsmen | MiLC | Cricket | Hanover Park | Chicago, Illinois | 2020 | 2 |
| Chicago Tigers | MiLC | Cricket | Hanover Park | Chicago, Illinois | 2022 | 0 |
| Chicago Prowl | MLQ | Quadball | Various | Chicago, Illinois | 2023 | 0 |

=== Independent league baseball ===
| Club | League | Venue | Location | Established | Championships |
|---|---|---|---|---|---|
| Joliet Slammers | Frontier League | Duly Health and Care Field | Joliet, Illinois | 2010 | 2 (2011, 2018) |
| Schaumburg Boomers | Frontier League | Wintrust Field | Schaumburg, Illinois | 2011 | 4 (2013, 2014, 2017, 2021) |
| Windy City ThunderBolts | Frontier League | Ozinga Field | Crestwood, Illinois | 1995 | 2 (2007, 2008) |
| Gary SouthShore RailCats | American Association | U.S. Steel Yard | Gary, Indiana | 2001 | 3 (2005, 2007, 2013) |
| Chicago Dogs | American Association | Impact Field | Rosemont, Illinois | 2018 | None |
| Kane County Cougars | American Association | Northwestern Medicine Field | Geneva, Illinois | 1991 | 4 (2001, 2014, 2024, 2025) |

=== Hockey ===
The Chicago metropolitan area is also home to the Chicago Wolves of the American Hockey League. The Chicago Wolves have been successful, making numerous playoff appearances and winning the Turner and Calder cups many times. Playing in suburban Geneva are the Chicago Steel of the United States Hockey League, a Tier One Junior Hockey league, the only tier one junior league in the United States.

=== Arena football ===
The Chicago metropolitan area was also home to the Chicago Rush of the Arena Football League, who played at Allstate Arena in Rosemont. The Rush won its first championship in 2006, ArenaBowl XX. Chicago was also home to the Chicago Bruisers from 1987 to 1989, an original team in the AFL's inaugural season in 1987. The Bruisers hosted ArenaBowl II.

The Chicago Rush had been a member of the Arena Football League since 2001, and won ArenaBowl XX, playing in suburban Rosemont, although they now played in Rockford, as of 2013. The team has been defunct since 2013.

The Arena Football League front office was based in Chicago.

=== Rugby ===
The Chicago Hounds of Major League Rugby began play in 2023 at SeatGeek Stadium in Bridgeview, Illinois. The Hounds took down the California Legion, 35–17, to capture the first undefeated season (10–0) in league history and clinch the team's first-ever MLR title.

The Chicago Griffins and Chicago Lions both play in the Midwest Rugby Premiership.

Chicago Stockyarders rugby league team played in 2010's AMNRL's War at the Shore in a 7s match against the Northern Raiders.

In international rugby union, Soldier Field was the site of the first-ever victory by Ireland over New Zealand, with the Irish defeating the All Blacks 40–29 on November 5, 2016.

=== Other sports ===
Chicago is home to the Chicago Blitz of the X League.

The Chicago area has also played host to the WWE's WrestleMania multiple times, most recently for WrestleMania 22. Five-time world champion CM Punk is a Chicago native who still lives in the city. Chicago has also hosted major professional wrestling matches, including WrestleMania 22, and several other pay-per-view events, such as Money in the Bank in 2011, Extreme Rules in 2012, and WWE Payback in 2013. The northwest suburb of Hoffman Estates hosted All In in 2018, the first U.S. wrestling event not sponsored by WWE or the now-defunct WCW in 25 years to have sold more than 10,000 tickets. This event was the springboard for the creation of All Elite Wrestling (AEW) several months later. AEW would run two historically significant shows in the Chicago area in 2021. The first, The First Dance, was held at the United Center on August 20. During this show, CM Punk debuted for AEW, marking his first appearance as an active wrestler since his acrimonious departure from WWE in 2014. Then, during Labor Day weekend on September 5, the All Out pay-per-view saw AEW visit the same Hoffman Estates venue that had hosted All In. During this event, Punk wrestled his first match since his WWE departure, defeating Darby Allin. At the time, All Out was the most-purchased AEW PPV, and according to veteran wrestling journalist Dave Meltzer was the most-bought non-WWE professional wrestling PPV in history.

Starting just off Navy Pier is the Chicago Yacht Club Race to Mackinac, a 333-mile (289 nmi; 536 km) offshore yacht race held each July. It is the oldest annual freshwater distance race in the world. 2015 marks the 107th running of the "Mac".

Chicago is home to two all-female roller derby leagues; Chicago Outfit Roller Derby and Windy City Rollers of the Women's Flat Track Derby Association. As of November 2013, Windy City is ranked 8th worldwide out of over 175 WFTDA members, hosted the WFTDA Championship in 2010, and play their home games at UIC Pavilion. The Chicago area is also home to the Chicago Red Hots, an amateur roller derby club affiliated with USA Roller Sports under the US Olympic Committee, who play at the Cicero Stadium. The Red Hots participated in the 2013 National Championship where they placed 4th in the nation.

The city is also home to the Chicago Patriots Gaelic Football Club.

== College sports ==
Seven NCAA Division I athletic programs reside in the Chicago metropolitan area. The DePaul Blue Demons, Loyola Ramblers, Chicago State Cougars, and UIC Flames, all but Chicago State do not sponsor football, are all within the city limits. All play their main revenue sport of men's basketball in the city; only DePaul does not play on its campus, instead using Wintrust Arena at the McCormick Place convention center on the Near South Side.

The Northwestern Wildcats, Northern Illinois Huskies, and Valparaiso Beacons are all programs that play in the surrounding area. Northern Illinois is an Division I Bowl Subdivision school along with Northwestern, which is the only Power Four school in the Chicago area. Although the Illinois Fighting Illini are located two hours south in Champaign, they have the largest fan following in Chicago. The football program of Notre Dame, which is located in South Bend, Indiana, which is an hour and a half to the east, also has a huge following in the Chicago Area, especially in its southwest suburbs.

The Big Ten Conference is headquartered in Rosemont after relocating from another suburb, Park Ridge, in 2013.

=== College football ===
Chicago's college football history includes hosting the home field of at least 4 national champions (1905 Chicago Maroons, 1913 Chicago Maroons, 1929 Notre Dame Fighting Irish and 2011 Saint Xavier Cougars). Although all of the other current Division I athletic programs in Chicago have a history of Division I football, none play varsity football now. Former football powerhouse Chicago Maroons football has a storied major football history, but it has not played Division I football since 1939. Several regional football Division I football programs (including Northwestern, Illinois, Notre Dame and Northern Illinois) have on occasion played football games in Chicago. Several Chicago colleges currently have football programs that are not Division I.

At the inception of Chicago State Cougars football in 2026, some collegiate athletic programs participated in NCAA Division I athletic competition for many other sports in the city of Chicago: DePaul Blue Demons in the Big East Conference (since 2005), Loyola Ramblers in the Atlantic 10 Conference (since 2022), and UIC Flames in the Missouri Valley Conference (since 2022). All three of these other current Division I athletic programs in Chicago have a history of collegiate football: University of Illinois Chicago precursor component's Chicago Circle Chikas football last competed in the 1973 NCAA Division III football season DePaul Blue Demons football's last team was the 1938 team. The 1930 Loyola Ramblers football team was the school's final season as a major Independent. Also, Illinois Tech precursor, Lewis Institute, intermittently fielded a football team at least into the 1920s.

Also at the time of inception of the program there were several college football programs in Chicago that were not Division I: Roosevelt Lakers (DII), North Park Vikings football (DIII), Chicago Maroons football (DIII), Saint Xavier University (NAIA). Chicago Maroons won two national championships (1905 and 1913) as a member of the Big Ten Conference, but now competes in the Midwest Conference (since 2017) of NCAA Division III. Roosevelt University currently plays football in the Great Lakes Intercollegiate Athletic Conference of the NCAA Division II. Home stadium, Morris Field, however is located in Arlington Heights, Illinois. North Park has competed in football since 1934, and they moved to the College Conference of Illinois and Wisconsin of NCAA Division III in 1962. 2011 Saint Xavier Cougars won the 2011 NAIA football national championship.

In Chicago, both Wrigley Field and Soldier Field have hosted college football games hosted by non-Chicago football programs on occasion. Several regional college, such as Northwestern based in Evanston and Illinois based in Champaign, Illinois, both of the Big Ten Conference (since 1896), and Notre Dame based in South Bend, Indiana have hosted individual games at these fields. Some of these games have been very significant. The November 22, 1924 in the Northwestern–Notre Dame football rivalry game was the first college football game ever played at Soldier Field. Northwestern handed the eventual National Champion 1925 Michigan Wolverines football team its only loss and posted the only points scored against them all season at Soldier Field. Soldier Field had its formal dedication on November 27, 1926, when it hosted over 110,000 people for the Army–Navy Game. The 1927 Notre Dame–USC football rivalry game set a record for the highest college football game attendance at 123,000 at Soldier Field. The National Champion 1929 Notre Dame Fighting Irish football team played all their "home games" there following the 1928 demolition of Cartier Field to make way for the 1930 opening of Notre Dame Stadium. As of 2025 Northwestern is 1–6 at Wrigley Field with games starting in 2010. As of 2021 Notre Dame is 11–0–2 at Soldier Field. The Illinois–Northwestern football rivalry had two games at Wrigley Field 2010 and 2024, and one at Soldier Field in 2015. Since its 1994 debut at Soldier Field, Illinois has compiled an 0–4 record there as of 2018. The Northern Illinois Huskies football team has also hosted a series of games at Soldier field since the 2003 renovation of the stadium. NIU has hosted the 2007 Iowa Hawkeyes, 2011 Wisconsin Badgers, and 2012 Hawkeyes. They had also scheduled a game against the 2016 Nebraska Cornhuskers at Soldier Field that did not take place.

== Olympic bids ==
After a months' long process that saw the elimination of several American and international cities, Chicago was selected on April 14, 2007, to represent the United States internationally in the bidding for the 2016 Summer Olympics. The International Olympic Committee eventually shortlisted four of the seven applicant cities, where Chicago remained, before Rio de Janeiro was elected as the host in 2009. Following Chicago's loss in the race for the 2016 Olympics, the USOC bid for the 2024 Olympics with Los Angeles which result in a deal where Los Angeles secured the right to host the 2028 Summer Olympics. Chicago had previously hosted the 1959 Pan American Games. Chicago was selected to host the 1904 Summer Olympics, but they were transferred to St. Louis to coincide with the Louisiana Purchase Exposition.

== Motorsports ==
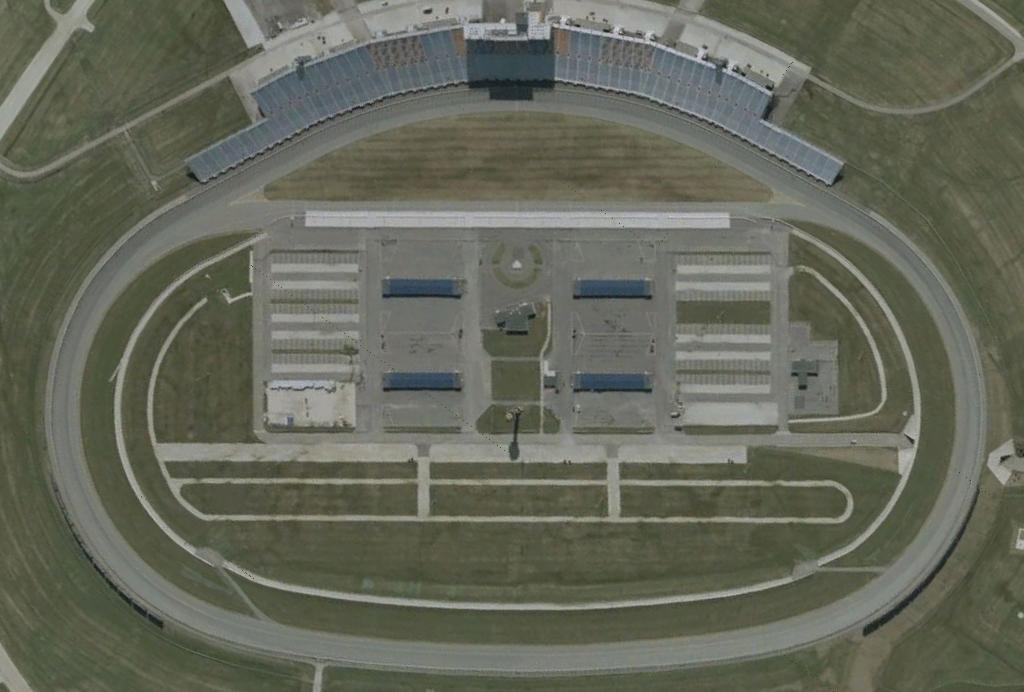
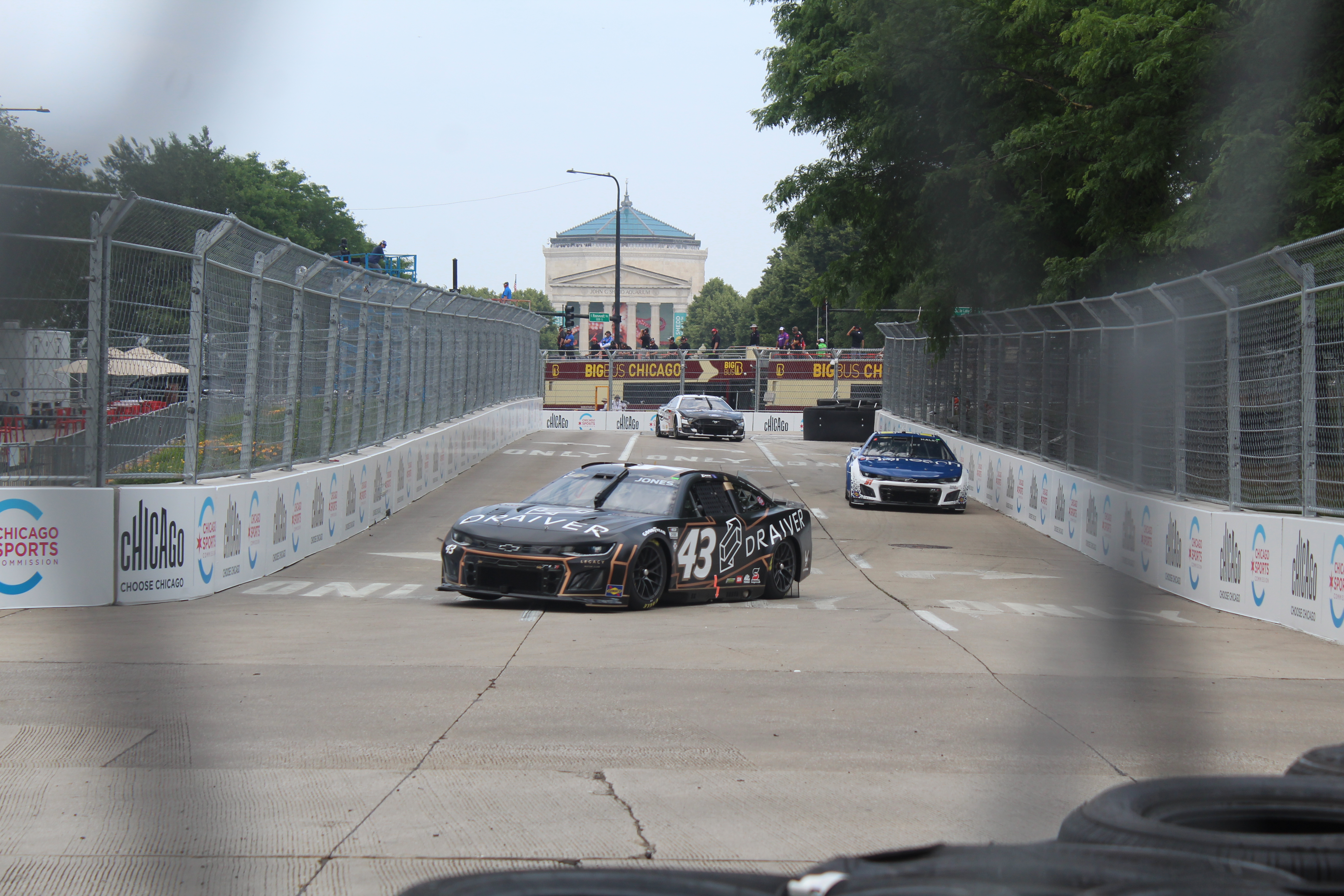
Chicagoland Speedway (left) and the Chicago Street Course (right).

The area is home to the Chicagoland Speedway, which is located in Joliet and the Chicago Street Course in the streets of Chicago.

Chicagoland Speedway hosts the NASCAR Cup Series' Camping World 400, the NASCAR O'Reilly Auto Parts Series' Camping World 300, and the Dawn 150 for the ARCA Menards Series. The track also held the Camping World 225 for the NASCAR Craftsman Truck Series and the Peak Antifreeze Indy 300 for the NTT IndyCar Series. Although a NASCAR Cup Series race was scheduled in 2020, the race was cancelled due to the COVID-19 pandemic. In May 2020, plans were made to convert 82 acres (33 ha) of the facility's parking lots into warehouse storage; however, the plan faced opposition from the Joliet City Council Economic Development Committee and was rejected by the Joliet Plan Commission in August. In September, NASCAR announced that all three national series would not return to Chicagoland Speedway for the 2021 season, leaving the track with an uncertain future. Paddock resigned as president a month later. The track was left widely dormant in the following years after NASCAR's departure. After many rumors and speculation, on July 30, 2025, The Athletic reported that the Cup Series was expected to return to the facility in 2026 following the removal of a race at the Chicago Street Course. On August 20, 2025, NASCAR announced the 2026 season schedules, which featured the Cup and O'Reilly Auto Parts Series running at the track for the first time since 2019, returning to the July 4th weekend for 2026.

The Chicago Street Course hosted the Grant Park 165 and The Loop 110. The circuit is a 2.140 mi (3.444 km) loop through Grant Park, starting and ending on Columbus Drive in front of Buckingham Fountain and including portions of Columbus Drive, Balbo Drive, Lake Shore Drive, Roosevelt Road, Michigan Avenue, Congress Plaza Drive, and Jackson Drive. After the 2025 race weekend, Mayor Brandon Johnson's administration stated they are willing to extend the contract for a further two years, but only after exploring a date change. Event officials announced on X that the race would be removed from the 2026 schedule and would later be announced that Chicagoland Speedway would return to the schedule for 2026.

The Route 66 Raceway is also located in Joliet. The track hosts drag racing events and is funded by nine local entrepreneurs headed by IndyCar owner Dale Coyne. It currently hosts the NHRA Mission Foods Drag Racing Series Route 66 NHRA Nationals and previously held the AMA Supercross Championship in 2000 on a Daytona-style course on the dragstrip.

== Rivalries ==
=== Detroit ===
Due to geographical proximity and a long history, Chicago and Detroit have developed a rivalry throughout the big 4 sports and even at the collegiate level.

=== Milwaukee/Wisconsin ===
Chicago has also developed a rivalry with Milwaukee due to their metropolitan areas bordering each other. While the Packers currently play in Green Bay, they spent several decades playing regular season games in Milwaukee and have a large fanbase there.

=== Minnesota ===
Chicago and Minnesota have also developed a rivalry, though it is much newer compared to Detroit and Milwaukee.

=== St. Louis ===
Chicago and St. Louis have a rivalry that is primarily in baseball, though this has spread to other sports such as hockey and soccer.

=== New York City ===
Chicago and New York City have a rivalry.

== Former teams ==
=== Baseball ===
- Chicago Columbia Giants (Negro National League)
- Chicago Unions (Negro National League)
- Chicago Union Giants (Negro National League)
- Leland Giants (Negro National League)
- Chicago Giants (Independent, National Negro League)
- Chicago American Giants (Negro National League)
- Chicago Brown Bombers (Negro Major League, United States League)
- Chicago Whales (Federal League)
- Chicago Colleens (All-American Girls Professional Baseball League)

=== Basketball ===
- Chicago Bruins (American Basketball League)
- Chicago American Gears (National Basketball League)
- Chicago Stags (National Basketball Association)
- Chicago Packers (currently the Washington Wizards) (NBA)
- Chicago Majors (American Basketball League)
- Chicago Express (World Basketball League)
- Chicago Rockstars (American Basketball Association)
- Chicago Skyliners (American Basketball Association)
- Chicago Soldiers (American Basketball Association)
- Chicago Twisters (Women's Basketball Association)
- Chicago Hustle (Women's Professional Basketball League)
- Chicago Muscle (Premier Basketball League)

=== Football ===
- Chicago Cardinals (National Football League)
- Chicago Tigers (National Football League)
- Chicago Bulls (American Football League)
- Chicago Fire (World Football League)
- Chicago Winds (World Football League)
- Chicago Blitz (United States Football League)
- Chicago Enforcers (XFL)
- Chicago Bruisers (Arena Football League)
- Chicago Slaughter (Indoor Football League)
- Chicago Rush (Arena Football League)
- Chicago Knights (Continental Indoor Football League)
- Chicago Bliss (Legends Football League)
- Chicago Force (Independent Women's Football League)

=== Hockey ===
- Chicago Cougars (World Hockey Association)
- Chicago Hounds (United Hockey League)
- Chicago Express (ECHL)
- Chi-Town Shooters (All American Hockey League)
- Chicago Blaze (All American Hockey League)
- Chicago Shamrocks (American Hockey Association)

=== Lacrosse ===
- Chicago Shamrox (National Lacrosse League)
- Chicago Machine (Major League Lacrosse)

=== Soccer ===
- Chicago Spurs (National Professional Soccer League)
- Chicago Mustangs (United Soccer Association)
- Chicago Horizons (Major Indoor Soccer League)
- Chicago Sting (North American Soccer League and MISL)
- Chicago Vultures (American Indoor Soccer Association)
- Chicago Shoccers (American Indoor Soccer Association)
- Chicago Power (AISA and NPSL)
- Chicago Storm (Major Indoor Soccer League)
- Chicago Riot (Major Indoor Soccer League)

=== Tennis ===
- Chicago Aces (World Team Tennis)
- Laver Cup

=== Softball ===
- Chicago Bandits (National Pro Fastpitch (NPF))
- Chicago Storm (American Professional Slo-Pitch League (APSPL))
- Chicago Nationwide Advertising (North American Softball League (NASL))

== See also ==
- 16-inch softball
- Arlington Park
- Chicagoland Speedway
- Chicagoland Sports Hall of Fame
- Chicago bid for the 2016 Summer Olympics
- Chicago Marathon
- Hawthorne Race Course
- Illinois High School Association (IHSA)
- Multiple major sports championship seasons
