= 10th Soccer Bowl =

The 10th Soccer Bowl may refer to:

- Soccer Bowl '77, the tenth championship game of the original North American Soccer League
- Soccer Bowl Series '84, the tenth championship series of the original North American Soccer League that used the "Soccer Bowl" moniker
