= 7th Soccer Bowl =

The 7th Soccer Bowl may refer to:

- Soccer Bowl '75, the seventh championship game of the original North American Soccer League
- Soccer Bowl '81, the seventh championship game of the original North American Soccer League that used the "Soccer Bowl" moniker
- Soccer Bowl 2017, the seventh championship game of the second North American Soccer League
