= David Socha =

American soccer referee (1938–2025)

- Full name: David Stanley Socha
- Born: September 27, 1938; Springfield, Massachusetts, U.S.
- Died: February 10, 2025 (aged 86); Ludlow, Massachusetts, U.S.

International
| Years | League | Role |
| 1979–1986 | FIFA-listed | Referee |

David Stanley Socha (September 27, 1938 – February 10, 2025) was an American soccer referee. He is best known for supervising two matches in the FIFA World Cup, one in 1982 and one in 1986. The 1982 match between Scotland and New Zealand marked the second ever World Cup match supervised by an American referee after Henry Landauer in 1970. Socha played in the semiprofessional leagues of the United States and two seasons for Portsmouth in the 1950s. At Portsmouth, he was a reserve.

Socha is known to have served as a FIFA referee during the period from 1979 to 1986. His other international events include the 1984 Olympic tournament in Los Angeles and qualifying matches for the 1982 and 1986 World Cups. During his career working matches in the North American Soccer League (NASL) from 1978 to 1984, Socha was the head referee for Soccer Bowl '82, and for game 1 of Soccer Bowl '84. He was also an assistant referee at Soccer Bowl '78.

Socha died at age 86 at his home in Ludlow, Massachusetts, on February 10, 2025.
