= Dieter Ferner =

German footballer

Personal information
- Date of birth: 16 January 1949
- Place of birth: Wuppertal, West Germany
- Height: 1.86 m (6 ft 1 in)
- Position: Goalkeeper

Senior career*
Years	Team	Apps	(Gls)
1968–1973	Bayer Leverkusen		
1973–1975	Rot-Weiß Oberhausen	64	(0)
1975–1980	1. FC Saarbrücken	146	(0)
1980–1981	1. FC Bocholt	41	(0)
1981–1983	Chicago Sting	30	(0)
1981–1983	Chicago Sting (indoor)	38	(0)
1983–1984	Rot-Weiß Oberhausen	3	(0)

Managerial career
- 1991: 1. FC Saarbrücken
- 1991–1992: 1. FC Saarbrücken II
- 1999–2005: 1. FC Saarbrücken II
- 2005–2006: FC Kutzhof
- 2007: SC Friedrichsthal
- 2008–2010: 1. FC Saarbrücken
- 2012–2014: Borussia Neunkirchen
- * Club domestic league appearances and goals

Dieter Ferner (born 16 January 1949) is a German former football player and manager who played as a goalkeeper.
