= Derek Spalding =

Soccer player (born 1954)

Personal information
- Date of birth: 20 December 1954 (age 71)
- Place of birth: Dundee, Scotland
- Position: Defender

Senior career*
Years	Team	Apps	(Gls)
1972–1977	Hibernian	74	(1)
1978–1982	Chicago Sting	119	(15)
1982–1983	Chicago Sting (indoor)	4	(0)
1983–1984	Toronto Blizzard	34	(0)
1984–1986	Chicago Sting (indoor)	51	(10)

International career
1982	United States	1	(0)

Managerial career
- 1990: Chicago Power
- * Club domestic league appearances and goals

Derek Spalding (born 20 December 1954) is a former soccer player who played as a defender. He played for Hibernian in the Scottish Football League until he emigrated to the United States in 1977. He then played seven seasons in the North American Soccer League and at least two in the Major Indoor Soccer League. He also earned one cap with the US national team, in 1982.

== Club career ==
Spalding was born in Dundee, Scotland. Growing up in Scotland, he signed with First Division club Hibernian as a youth player. He worked his way through the reserves before gaining a spot on the first team in 1972. Spalding played for Hibs in the 1974 Scottish League Cup Final, which Hibs lost 6–3 to Celtic.

He played with Hibs until he left Scotland to move to the United States. Spalding had married an American woman and therefore qualified for a green card. When he signed with the Chicago Sting of the North American Soccer League (NASL) in 1978, he counted as one of the team's American players. He played five seasons in Chicago, winning the 1981 NASL championship with the Sting. In 1983, he signed with the Toronto Blizzard and spent two seasons in Canada. In both 1983 and 1984, Spalding and his teammates went to the NASL championship, only to lose to the Tulsa Roughnecks in 1983 and the Sting in 1984.

Both the Blizzard and the NASL folded at the end of the 1984 season. With the collapse of the NASL, the Sting jumped to the Major Indoor Soccer League and Spalding signed with the Sting on 22 November 1984. Spalding underwent ankle surgery following a game injury in 1986. He lost the rest of the season, then was cut by the Sting and denied workers compensation benefits. This led Spalding to join Rudy Glenn, who had also suffered a career-ending injury, in a suit against the Sting in September 1986.

== International career ==
Spalding earned one cap with the US national team in a 2–1 win over Trinidad and Tobago on 21 March 1982.

== Coaching and managerial career ==
Spalding served as an assistant coach with the Chicago Power of the National Professional Soccer League. During the 1989–1990 season, head coach Karl-Heinz Granitza was fired and Spalding served as head coach for the remainder of the season. He was fired at the end of the season, to be replaced by Pato Margetic.

== See also ==
- List of United States men's international soccer players born outside the United States
