= Mark Simanton =

American soccer player

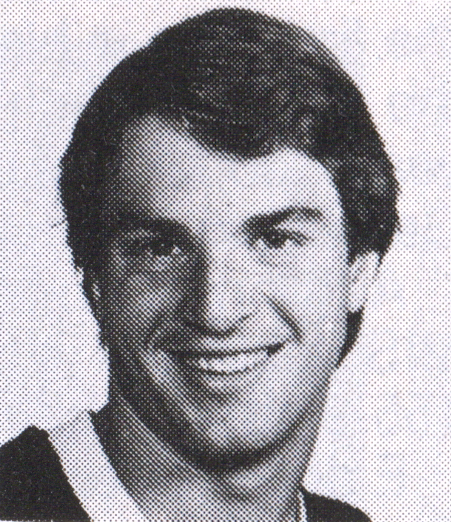
- Simanton circa 1984

Personal information
- Date of birth: December 8, 1958 (age 67)
- Place of birth: Chicago, Illinois, United States
- Position: Midfielder

Youth career
- 1976–1979: Indiana Hoosiers

Senior career*
Years	Team	Apps	(Gls)
1980–1984	Chicago Sting	84	(3)
1980–1982	Chicago Sting (NASL indoor)	65	(34)
1982–1987	Chicago Sting (MISL indoor)	115	(13)
Total		264	(50)
- * Club domestic league appearances and goals

Mark Simanton is a retired American soccer midfielder who spent his entire professional career with the Chicago Sting.

Simanton graduated from New Trier West High School. He attended the Indiana University where he played on the men's soccer team from 1976 to 1979.

In 1980, Simanton turned professional with the Chicago Sting of the North American Soccer League. He would remain with the Sting for his entire career which consisted of five outdoor seasons, two NASL indoor seasons and four seasons in the Major Indoor Soccer League. During these years, the Sting won both the 1981 and 1984 NASL titles. In 1987, Simanton publicly criticized the Sting for hiring Erich Geyer as head coach. He became a free agent that summer and refused to sign with the Sting. He then became a vice-president of Huron Partners, a real estate development company. He also served as a broadcast analyst for Sting games.
