= Frantz Mathieu =

Haitian footballer (born 1952)

Personal information
- Date of birth: 23 December 1952 (age 73)
- Place of birth: Acul-du-Nord, Haiti
- Height: 1.80 m (5 ft 11 in)
- Position: Defender

Senior career*
Years	Team	Apps	(Gls)
1978–1979	FC St. Pauli	20	(0)
1980–1982	Chicago Sting	62	(3)
1982–1983	Montreal Manic	50	(2)
1983–84	Tampa Bay Rowdies (indoor)	23	(5)
1984	Chicago Sting	6	(0)
1984–1985	Chicago Sting (indoor)	39	(5)
1985–1987	Baltimore Blast (indoor)	54	(9)
1987–1988	Chicago Sting (indoor)	52	(9)
Total		306	(33)

International career
1976–1981	Haiti	15	(0)
- * Club domestic league appearances and goals

Frantz Mathieu (born 23 December 1952) is a Haitian former professional footballer who played as a defender. He spent most of his career in the United States, notably with Chicago Sting. At international level, he made 15 appearances for the Haiti national team.

== Club career ==
Mathieu spent the 1978–79 season in West Germany with FC St. Pauli, before spending time in the North American Soccer League and Major Indoor Soccer League, playing with the Chicago Sting, the Tampa Bay Rowdies, the Montreal Manic and the Baltimore Blast.

== International career ==
Mathieu also represented the Haiti national team at international level, appearing in fifteen FIFA World Cup qualifying matches between 1976 and 1981.

== Honors ==
Chicago Sting

- NASL, Soccer Bowl: 1981, 1984
- Runner-up NASL Indoor season: 1980–81

Individual

- NASL All-Star First Team Selections: 1981
- NASL All-Star Honorable Mentions: 1980
