= Seninho =

Portuguese footballer (1949–2020)

Personal information
- Full name: Arsénio Rodrigues Jardim
- Date of birth: 1 July 1949
- Place of birth: Sá da Bandeira, Angola
- Date of death: 4 July 2020 (aged 71)
- Place of death: Porto, Portugal
- Height: 1.77 m (5 ft 10 in)
- Position: Winger

Youth career
- Porto

Senior career*
Years	Team	Apps	(Gls)
1969–1978	Porto	121	(24)
1978–1982	New York Cosmos	58	(11)
1983–1984	Chicago Sting	47	(14)
Total		226	(49)

International career
1976–1978	Portugal	4	(1)
- * Club domestic league appearances and goals

Arsénio Rodrigues Jardim (1 July 1949 – 4 July 2020), known as Seninho, was a Portuguese professional footballer who played as a right winger.

== Club career ==
Seninho was born in Sá da Bandeira, Portuguese Angola. In his country, he only played with FC Porto, making his Primeira Liga debut in the 1969–70 season, which he ended with 18 games and six goals to help his team to the ninth position. He won the only national championship of his career with the club in 1978, contributing 29 matches and four goals to the feat.

Seninho and Porto reached the third round of the 1977–78 European Cup Winners' Cup. In the second, on 2 November 1977, he scored twice in a 5–2 away loss against Manchester United, with the tie being won 6–5 on aggregate.

Subsequently, aged 29, Seninho moved to the United States where he remained until his retirement, playing five years with the New York Cosmos and two with the Chicago Sting and winning the North American Soccer League with both sides – three titles with the former.

== International career ==
Seninho won four caps for Portugal in two years. His debut came on 7 April 1976, in a 3–1 friendly loss to Italy.

== Death ==
Seninho died on 4 July 2020 at the age of 71, after having been admitted to the University Hospital of São João in Porto.

== Honours ==
Porto

- Primeira Liga: 1977–78
- Taça de Portugal: 1976–77

New York Cosmos

- North American Soccer League: 1978, 1980, 1982

Chicago Sting

- North American Soccer League: 1984
