= Dave Huson =

Footballer (born 1951)

Personal information
- Date of birth: 5 January 1951 (age 75)
- Place of birth: Jersey
- Positions: Forward; defender

Senior career*
Years	Team	Apps	(Gls)
1970–1973	First Tower United		
1973	Cape Town City		
1973–1977	Hellenic		
1977–1978	Weymouth		
1978–1979	FC Twente		
1979–1980	California Surf	41	(1)
1980	Memphis Rogues	11	(2)
1980–1981	Calgary Boomers (indoor)		
1981	Chicago Sting	31	(4)
1981–1982	Chicago Sting (indoor)	15	(2)
1982	Tulsa Roughnecks	28	(2)
1983–1984	Chicago Sting	48	(3)
1983–1984	Chicago Sting (NASL indoor)		
1984–1985	Chicago Sting (MISL indoor)	17	(6)
1985	Cape Town Spurs		
1985–1986	Chicago Shoccers (indoor)		

Managerial career
- 1986: Chicago Shoccers
- 1999–2000: Rockford Raptors
- * Club domestic league appearances and goals

Dave Huson (born 5 January 1951) is a retired footballer from Jersey who played professionally in the North American Soccer League and Major Indoor Soccer League.

In 1979, Huson signed with the California Surf of the North American Soccer League. In 1980, the Surf sent Huson to the Memphis Rogues. At the end of the season, Nelson Skalbania purchased the Rogues and moved them to Calgary renaming the team the Calgary Boomers. Huson then played the 1980–81 NASL indoor season with the Boomers before being traded to the Chicago Sting. On 20 March 1982, the Sting traded Huson, John Tyma and a 1983 third-round draft pick to the Tulsa Roughnecks in exchange for Duncan McKenzie. He was back in Chicago for the 1983 season and would remain there until he was released by the team in May 1985. He then moved to the Chicago Shoccers of the American Indoor Soccer Association. In February 1986, Huson took over as head coach of the Shoccers. In the fall of 1986, he returned to the Sting as head of community relations. In 1999, he became the head coach of the Rockford Raptors of the Premier Development League. He also coached the Deerfield High School boys' soccer team. He was inducted into the Illinois State Soccer Hall of Fame in 2002.
