= Chicago Sting =

Former American soccer team (1974–1988)

- Full name: Chicago Sting
- Nicknames: The Sting; Der Sting
- Founded: 1974
- Dissolved: 1988; 38 years ago
- Stadium: Outdoor: Soldier Field; Comiskey Park; Wrigley Field; Indoor: International Amphitheatre; Chicago Stadium; Rosemont Horizon
- Coach: Bill Foulkes; Malcolm Musgrove; Willy Roy; Erich Geyer; Gary Hindley
- League: NASL (1975–84)
Home colors	Away colors

The Chicago Sting (1974–1988) was an American professional soccer team representing Chicago. The Sting played in the North American Soccer League from 1975 to 1984 and in the Major Indoor Soccer League in the 1982–83 season and again from 1984 to 1988. They were North American Soccer League champions in 1981 and 1984, one of only two NASL teams (the New York Cosmos) to win the championship twice.

The Sting were founded in 1974 by Lee Stern of Chicago and competed in the NASL for the first time in the 1975 season. A few years after founding the Sting, Stern brought Willy Roy on as head coach. Roy coached the Sting for the remainder of their outdoor existence.

The team was named in reference to the popular 1973 film, The Sting, whose action was set in Chicago of the 1930s.

The club played at various venues. The outdoor team played their home games at Soldier Field, Wrigley Field, and Comiskey Park. In 1976 the indoor squad called the International Amphitheatre home, before subsequently using Chicago Stadium and the Rosemont Horizon (now the Allstate Arena).

== Stern, Foulkes, Hill and May ==
1974–75: The Chicago Sting were the dream child of Lee Stern, a leading Chicago commodities broker, who in 1974 took an expensive gamble that his hometown would accept soccer as a major league sport. Stern turned to England for a coach in the shape of 'Busby Babe' Bill Foulkes, the former Manchester United defender.

Foulkes built a team of predominantly British players (there were 10 in the 1975 squad and 11 in 1976 and 1977) including Gordon Hill and Eddie May. Hill would later win 6 England caps and play over a hundred games for Manchester United including the 1976 FA Cup Final. In Chicago he hit six goals in the Sting's inaugural season and firmly established himself as a fan's favorite as did May who despite playing all of his career in the UK as a central defender, was used by Foulkes as a target man scoring 7 times in 18 games which included the winner on his debut in Sting's 1–0 victory over Los Angeles Aztecs, just 24 hours after arriving into Chicago from Welsh club Wrexham.

In the summer of 1975 a sparse crowd of 4,500 watched the Sting's very first home game and as it began so it continued with an average that year of around the 4,000 mark – although close to 14,000 did turn out to see the Sting take on the 1974 Polish World Cup team in a one-off exhibition.

The Sting missed out on the playoffs by a single point losing the final game of the season in a penalty shoot-out (Hill missing his attempt).

== Cosmos doubled, Willie Morgan, Foulkes quits ==
In 1976, more players from the British Isles joined The Sting. Polish striker Janusz Kowalik, who had found success during his only season with the Chicago Mustangs eight years earlier, joined as well.

Although the British incomers were less famous – John James (from Tranmere Rovers), John Lowey (from Manchester United's youth team), Lammie Robertson (Exeter City) and Alan Waldron (Bolton Wanderers & Blackpool) – the club won its first honor in the form of the Northern Division title.

Although the team lost in the first round of the playoffs to the Toronto Blizzard, they had twice defeated the New York Cosmos (a team featuring international stars Pelé, Franz Beckenbauer, and Giorgio Chinaglia) in regular season play, first winning two-nil in New York, and then at home 4–1.

Before the 1977 season, head coach Bill Foulkes signed Willie Morgan who would prove to be one of the most successful and popular players in the NASL's history. Morgan, had played over 500 games in the Football League for Bolton Wanderers, Burnley and Manchester United. Also arriving from the UK was Ronnie Moore a prolific striker from Tranmere Rovers, but despite these additions the Sting played poorly and Foulkes resigned halfway through the season leaving Willy Roy, his assistant, as interim coach.

Roy, a German by birth who had arrived with his family in Chicago at the age of six, was a veteran of the early years of the NASL and its forerunner the NPSL. The Sting finished the season with a 10 win 16 loss record.

== Musgrove disaster, Karl-Heinz Granitza signs ==
At the beginning of the 1978 NASL season the Sting lost its first ten matches, not the start owner Lee Stern had hoped for when he hired Clive Toye as new club president who in turn had hired Malcolm Musgrove as the team's new head coach. Toye had been one of the people behind the success of the New York Cosmos, while Musgrove, a former left-winger with West Ham United was a coach with a growing reputation.

Musgrove had spent heavily, bringing in four new players: Karl-Heinz Granitza (from Hertha Berlin), Arno Steffenhagen (from FC St. Pauli), Horst Blankenburg (who had played in the great Ajax side of the early 1970s alongside Johan Cruyff, and company) and Jørgen Kristensen (another former Hertha Berlin man). After the poor start, Musgrove was fired and Willy Roy was rehired as coach. The effect was immediate – ten wins were recorded in the last fourteen regular season games – and the Sting moved up from last place to second place in the Central Division to win a playoff berth.

Although eliminated from the playoffs by the Tampa Bay Rowdies the Sting (or "Der Sting" as they nicknamed with the shift from British players to German) won compliments for their aggressive play, scoring thirty-eight goals in those final fourteen games.

== Willy Roy appointed coach, On the brink ==
1979: At the end of the 1978 NASL season, Willy Roy was appointed head coach. The Sting were on their way to becoming one of the best sides in the league and to ensure success, Roy brought in four new players who would all play their part in the franchises best season yet: Willem van Hanegem arrived from Dutch side AZ, Luigi Martini from SS Lazio, Thomas Sjöberg from Malmö FF along with former Feyenoord man Peter Ressel.

All number of club records were broken as the Sting scored 70 goals – Karl-Heinz Granitza weighing in with 20 – and the average home attendance increased to a respectable 8,000, 21,000 plus turning out at Wrigley Field to see the New York Cosmos defeated 3–1. The Fort Lauderdale Strikers were beaten in the first round of the playoffs (the Sting winning the best of three series by two wins to none) but the San Diego Sockers proved to be too strong for Chicago and booked a place in the American Conference Finals with a 2–0 win in California followed by a 1–0 victory at Wrigley Field.

1980: Phil Parkes, the former Wolverhampton Wanderers 'keeper, became the Sting's number 1, moving to Chicago from the Vancouver Whitecaps where he had played for the past three seasons and established himself as the NASL's top glovesman. Also joining the Sting line-up were Ingo Peter (once of Borussia Dortmund) and Frantz Mathieu, a Haitian defender, who joined from FC St. Pauli.

The Sting took the Central Division title with a 21–11 record, 16 of those wins coming in their first 19 games. Karl-Heinz Granitza was again leading marksman with 19 goals and 26 assists, while Arno Steffenhagen took second place with 15 strikes and 15 assists from midfield.

The 1980 campaign, and the 1980–81 Indoor Season that followed (the Sting's first foray into the world of the indoor game), were major turning points as far as the Chicago public were concerned and the club started to attract large crowds on a regular basis. 26,468 saw the Sting take on the Tampa Bay Rowdies at Wrigley Field, 18,112 watched the Washington Diplomats home fixture, and two other matches drew crowds in excess of 16,000, while indoors 16,257 packed the Chicago Stadium for one game as the Sting's reached – but lost – the NASL Championship finals.

== 1981 Championship Season ==
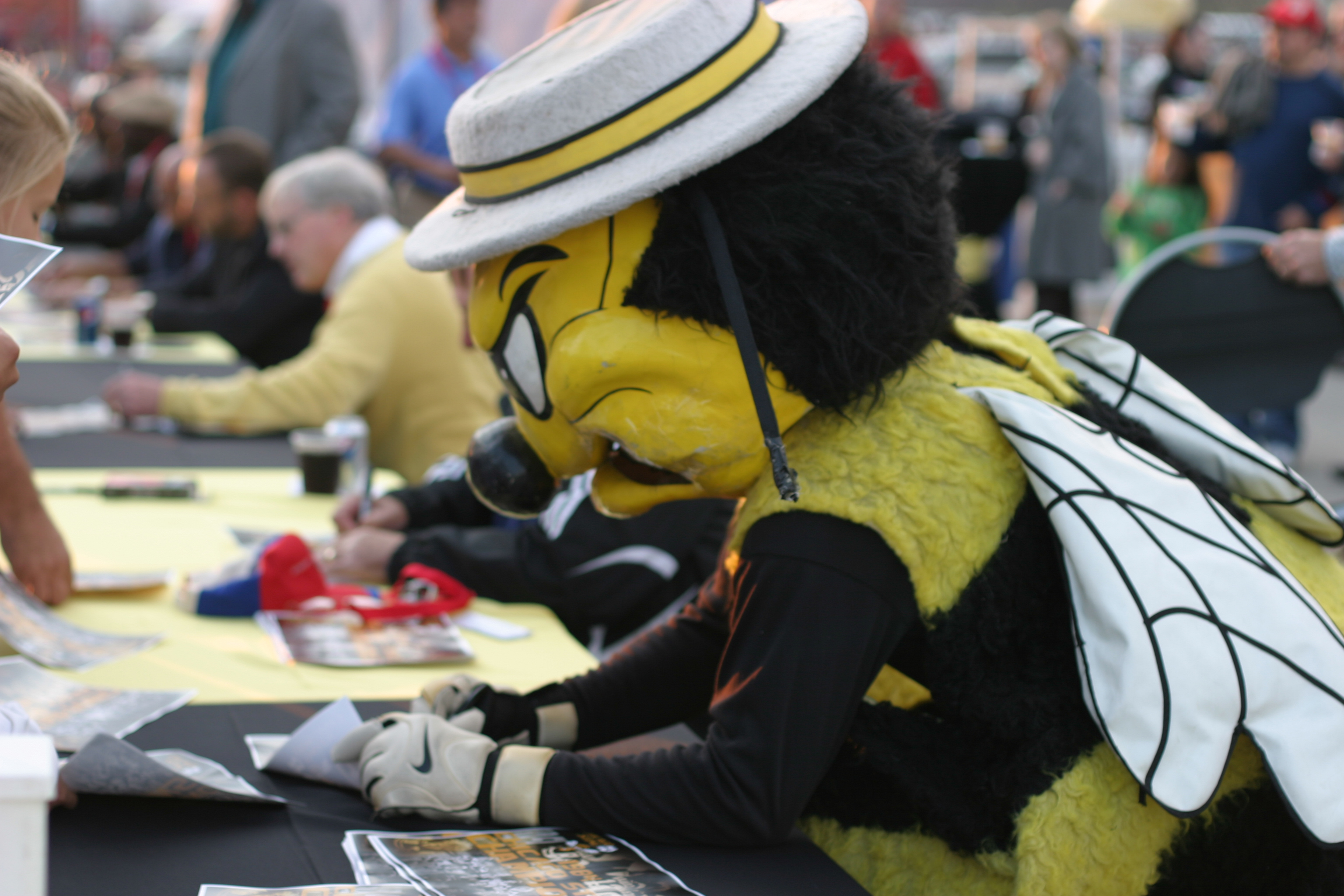
Chicago Sting Mascot 'Stanley Sting' pictured in 2009.

1981: The addition of Pato Margetic to the Sting front line – Margetic had joined from the Detroit Express – showed coach Will Roy's attacking intent for the coming campaign, indeed the club would finish as the NASL leading scorers with 81 goals.

The turning point in the season came at the end of the June when a new club record crowd of 30,501 turned out at Wrigley Field to see the Sting beat the New York Cosmos 6–5 after a shootout. This signalled the start of an eight-game winning streak.

The Central Division title was confirmed as the Sting completed the regular season with three straight home wins. The Dallas Tornado were beaten 3–1, the Ft. Lauderdale Strikers by a 7–2 margin and the Tulsa Roughnecks 5–4 to end the campaign with a 23 wins and 9 defeats.

In the first round of the playoffs the Seattle Sounders were beaten by two games to one and the Sting advanced to round two and a date with the Montreal Manic. A record soccer crowd of 58,542 in Montreal's Olympic Stadium saw the Manic take the first game 3–2, but the Sting bounced back to win games two and three both by a 4–2 margin, game three being won despite being 2–1 down with nine minutes left to play.

The San Diego Sockers now stood between the Sting and a first Soccer Bowl appearance. Two late goals by the Californian side gave them first blood and a 2–1 win, but the Sting won game two by the same scoreline in front of 21,760 at Comiskey Park. Five days later 39,623 Chicagoans saw the Sting take the series with a 1–0 overtime victory at the same venue. The Sting were heading for a Soccer Bowl showdown with the New York Cosmos.

== Soccer Bowl '81 ==
Eighteen years without a major sporting honor ended for the city of Chicago as the Sting won the NASL Championship to give the Windy City its first professional sports title since the Chicago Bears had won the NFL Championship Game in 1963. On that occasion the Bears had beaten the New York Giants and the Sting's triumph would be earned against another New York team, the Cosmos.

A crowd of 36,971 – including some 6,000 from Chicago – were on hand at Toronto's Exhibition Stadium. The fans were expecting a high scoring game as the two previous meetings between the Sting and the Cosmos that year had produced fifteen goals. So against the odds – after the normal 90 minutes and a further 15 minutes of sudden death overtime – that this game would end goalless.

Each side had plenty of scoring opportunities though, the closest of which came from the Sting's Pato Margetic whose strike was saved by a fully extended Hubert Birkenmeier in the Cosmos goal, teammate Ingo Peter's saw his header strike the crossbar and then the upright, and an overhead kick by Giorgio Chinaglia went just wide of the Sting goal.

Despite that effort, Chinaglia, the NASL's all-time leading scorer, was marshaled well by the defensive partnership of Frantz Mathieu and Paul Hahn, supply from the flanks by the Cosmos wingers was kept to a minimum by Dave Huson and Derek Spalding, the Sting's two fullbacks, while in goal Dieter Ferner put in another exemplary shift. At the other end the Cosmos backline, aided by Birkenmeier, was just as effective.

Twice in regular season play the Sting had needed extra time to beat the Cosmos and the same would be the case in Toronto. New York took the lead after three rounds through Vladislav Bogićević, Karl-Heinz Granitza then leveled things up before Ferner made a great save to keep out Ivan Buljan's chipped shot. Rudy Glenn then stepped up to beat Birkenmeier to become the first native North American to score a winning goal in a Soccer Bowl.

Joint captains Ingo Peter and Spalding proudly accepted the Championship Trophy from NASL Commissioner Phil Woosnam to confirm the Sting as the North American Soccer League champions for 1981.

== Sting set US indoor attendance record ==
1981–82 (Indoor): A dramatic and high scoring season saw the club top the Central Division pipping the Tampa Bay Rowdies to the title in the final game of the regular season. A then record attendance for an indoor soccer game in North America of 19,398 saw the Sting come from 8–4 down to beat the Rowdies 10–9 in sudden death overtime.

Chicago had topped the division for most of the season and remained undefeated in regular season play at the Chicago Stadium. Highlights en route to the title included the 10–3 defeat of the Montreal Manic, a 10–4 victory over the Tulsa Roughnecks and a 6–3 win against the New York Cosmos at home while on the road impressive 6–3 and 6–5 wins were recorded against, respectively, the Toronto Blizzard and Jacksonville Teamen.

Even more impressive were the growing attendances at the Chicago Stadium where the Sting were outdrawing the Chicago Bulls (NBA) and fast catching up with the crowds pulled in by the Chicago Blackhawks (NHL). Besides the record crowd of 19,398 for the Tampa Bay Rowdies game, 18,374 saw the New York Cosmos game, 13,000 turned out for the regular season game against the Tulsa Roughnecks while 16,000 attended the playoff game against the Oklahoma side.

It was against the Roughnecks that the Sting made an unexpected and early exit from the playoffs having been widely tipped to add the indoor crown to the Soccer Bowl trophy won the previous summer. The Sting lost the best of three game opener in Tulsa 5–4 but in a dramatic return at the Chicago Stadium the Sting turned a 6–1 deficit into a 7–6 victory, Karl-Heinz Granitza scoring the winner five minutes into sudden death overtime.

With the series tied at one game each a 15-minute mini-game followed. The Roughnecks took a three-goal lead, the Sting pulled a goal back but there was to be no dramatic comeback in this game as the Roughnecks advanced into round two of the playoffs with a 3–1 win to take the series by two games to one.

Karl-Heinz Granitza finished the season as the league's second highest scorer (behind Julie Veee of the San Diego Sockers) with 35 goals and 36 assists. In the home game against the New York Cosmos on January 30 he scored a hat-trick, as the Sting won 5–3, extending his indoor scoring streak to 35 consecutive games. Three games earlier he had beaten the league's existing record of 32 in the 6–5 overtime win against the Jacksonville Teamen.

== Defending champions fail to make playoffs ==
1982 (Outdoor): The possibility that the Sting would become the first defending champions to fail to make the playoffs since the Soccer Bowl's inauguration in 1975 was certainly far from anyone's minds when Chicago resumed NASL outdoor action in April. However, four straight losses in the opening month set the trend for what would become a topsy-turvy campaign.

The players had had little time to rest after a tough indoor season and the team and its management also had to adjust to a number of rule changes. First, the league had agreed to FIFA's demands that offside rule should apply from the half-way line and not the NASL's 35-yard line as had been the case since the league's inception. Second, the league insisted that clubs have at least four North Americans on the field at any one time. The Sting had sufficient players to do so but was left with a surfeit of foreign stars and David Huson and John Tyma – who had both played their part in the 1981 success – were traded to other teams.

The first win of the season came against the Tulsa Roughnecks at Wrigley Field on May 1 but that was just a brief respite as the Sting slumped to a further four defeats to end the month with a 1–7 record. Then, notably, Frantz Mathieu – a firm fan favourite – was traded to the Montreal Manic, with Gordon Hill coming the other way, making his return to Chicago after a seven-year absence.

A break from league action saw the Sting take part in the Trans-Atlantic Challenge Cup. After holding Nacional of Uruguay to a 0–0 tie and defeating Italian Seria A side Napoli 3–1 they lifted the trophy with a 4–3 victory against the New York Cosmos in front of 36,904 at Giants Stadium, New Jersey. But after winning the prestigious trophy it was back to NASL action and another defeat in a 3–0 reverse at the Seattle Sounders.

Defensive mistakes, poor officiating and continuing injury problems dogged the remainder of the season although the Chicagoans did manage a run of three straight wins to briefly keep alive hopes of making the playoffs. The Edmonton Drillers were beaten 3–2 at the start of July, followed by the Fort Launderdale Strikers 3–0 and a 2–1 shootout victory against the Tampa Bay Rowdies.

Those slim hopes finally came to end with a 3–1 loss at the New York Cosmos, followed, ironically, by two excellent performances that saw the Sting defeat the Toronto Blizzard 3–1 and the Montreal Manic 2–1, both at Comiskey Park, to close out the season, leaving the Sting with the worst win–loss record (13–19) in its history.

== Sting debut in MISL ==
1982–83 (Indoor): In the fall of 1982 agreement was reached between the NASL and the MISL to allow three franchises – the San Diego Sockers, the San Jose Earthquakes and the Chicago Sting – to join the MISL for the upcoming 1982–83 indoor season. With a regular season stretching from November to mid-April and comprising 48 games per team (compared to just 18 games in the NASL Indoor League the previous season) the Chicagoans had effectively signed up to play two full seasons a year, of two very different types of soccer.

Even so, the Sting, who were assigned to the Eastern Division, acquitted themselves well taking place in a three-way race for the division title, with the veteran Cleveland Force and the Baltimore Blast, eventually finishing third, two games behind the Blast in first place, and one behind the Force in second place, with a 28–20 record.

In the first round of the playoffs experience was a telling factor at Cleveland eased into the next round winning the best-of-three series 5–9, 5–4 and 7–5.

== Financial problems mount for NASL ==
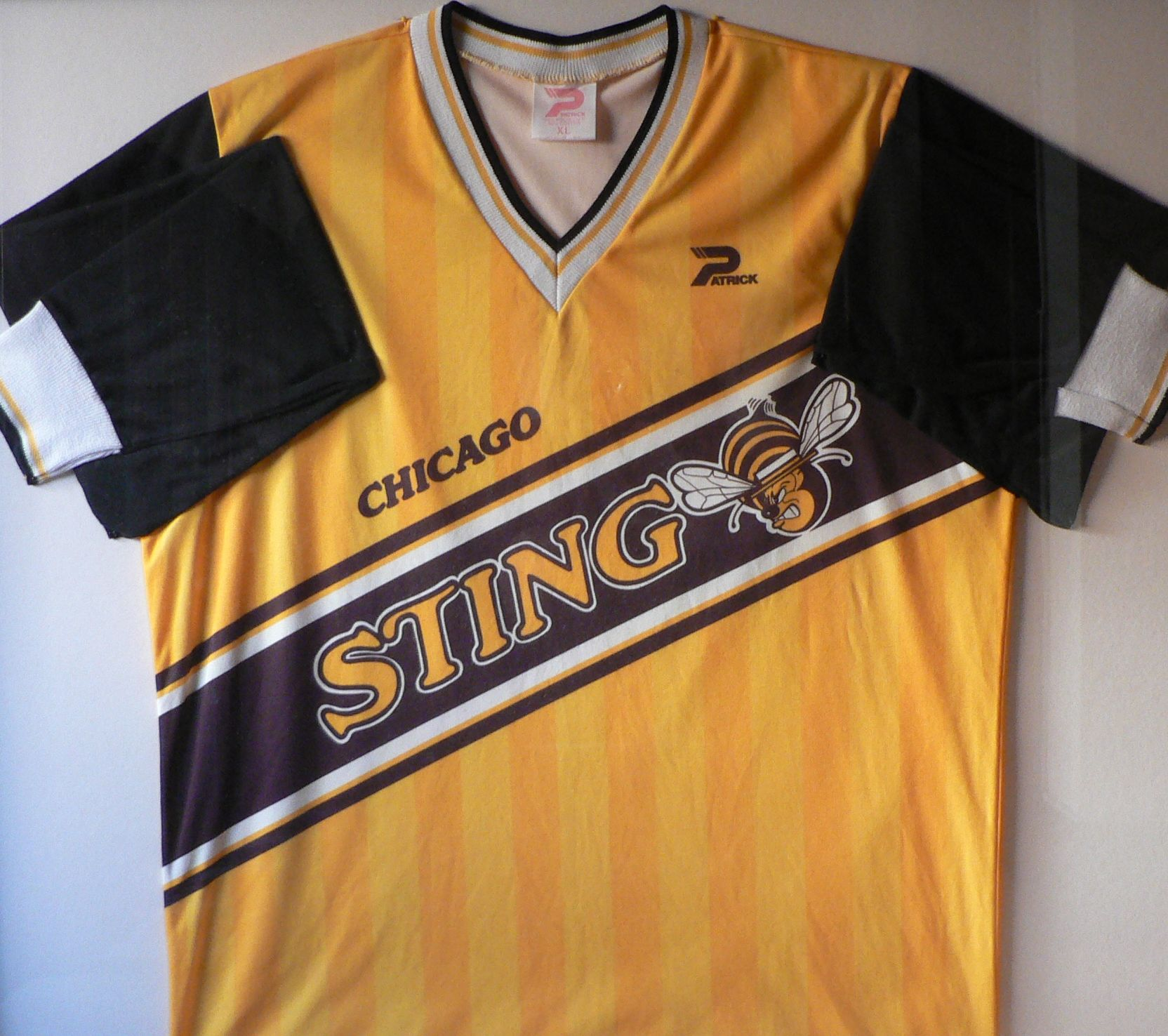
Chicago Sting 1984–86 Home Indoor Soccer Jersey.

1983 (Outdoor): An ongoing salary war between the NASL and the Major Indoor Soccer League was continuing to cause financial problems across the two leagues, and losses continued to pile up as the 1983 outdoor season got underway with just twelve teams (three down on 1982).

An improved Sting side completed the season with a 15 win 15 loss record to take second place in the Eastern Conference – behind the New York Cosmos – and a place in the playoffs for the first time in two seasons. It would be a short lived playoff campaign, however, as the Sting went out at the first round stage losing the best-of-three series with the Golden Bay Earthquakes (formerly the San Jose Earthquakes) 6–1, 0–1 and 5–2.

Karl-Heinz Granitza was once again top scorer for the Sting – and the league's second highest scorer behind Roberto Cabanas of the New York Cosmos – with 15 goals and 18 assists (48 points), Ricardo Alonso was second with 16 goals and 15 assists (47 points) and Pato Margetic third with 12 goals and 8 assists (32 points).

Home attendances averaged 10,937, an improvement of 1,600 fans per game over the previous season, although still below the NASL average of just over 13,000 per fixture.

== 1984 NASL championship and departure ==
Earlier in the year Sting ownership had requested a one-year leave of absence from the NASL, and were denied. With only a few games remaining in the season and still trying to qualify for the playoffs, Lee Stern announced that 1984 would be the Chicago Sting's NASL swan song. They, along with three other teams had been granted full admittance to the MISL. Not only were they able to make the playoffs, but they defeated Vancouver in a three-game semifinal, to face Toronto for the title.

The Blizzard, who were now being run by former Sting President Clive Toye, were one of the franchises fighting to keep the NASL afloat. Though it was a battle, Chicago took game one of the series at Comiskey Park, 2–1 on a late goal by Manny Rojas. This gave the Roy's Sting the unique opportunity to earn a second league title in the same city as their first. This time they would be playing at the more intimate Varsity Stadium instead of Exhibition Stadium, the site of the Soccer Bowl '81 triumph. After 68 minutes Chicago had built a 2–0 lead on goals by Mark Simanton and Pato Margetic. Toronto stormed back by scoring two goals in a 1:30 span to level the match in the 73rd minute. With 8:27 remaining in regulation Margetic notched his 6th goal of the playoffs off a pass from Rojas. Chicago goalkeeper Victor Nogueira was impressive in both matches, especially in the final minutes and the Sting held on to win their second title in four years. Margetic, with three of Chicago's five goals, was named the MVP of the finals.

In the immediate aftermath of the victory, Blizzard chairman Toye's actions were those of a sore loser. He refused to honor the long-standing tradition of entering the winning locker room to congratulate the victors. Toye followed that up by taking verbal jabs at Roy and Granitza in the press, referring to them as "cheats" and the Sting as "unworthy champions" among other things. He also said that Toronto did not deserve to lose. Not surprisingly Granitza responded in-kind. In the end the lack of sportsmanship mattered little, as Chicago walked off into the sunset with the trophy and the NASL ceased operations the following year with Toye as its interim president.

== Off-field antics overshadow Sting's worst ever indoor season ==
1985–86 (Indoor): The season kicked off with the Chicago Sting able to boast that they were the oldest existing professional soccer franchise in the United States. When it concluded it did so with a 23–29 win–loss record for the Sting, the worst in the club's indoor history.

After six indoor seasons at the Chicago Stadium the club had moved to the Rosemont Horizon, a stadium in the northern Chicago suburbs, in a bid to attract more fans. It however had the opposite effect with average attendance falling by almost 1,500 to an all-time low 5,879.

Personnel issues also played their part in a poor season. Head Coach Willy Roy, who had led the Sting to two NASL titles, was replaced by his assistant Eric Geyer in late December, and Karl-Heinz Granitza, the club's all-time leading goalscorer, who at the beginning of the season had seen his annual salary cut by $100,000 to $65,000, was suspended indefinitely on March 21 after an argument with owner Lee Stern.

While results picked up after Geyer's appointment – despite the decision on January 12 to trade leading scorer for the season so far, Drago Dumbovic, to the Baltimore Blast – it was not enough to overcome a very poor start and the Sting failed to make the playoffs for the second season running.

Meanwhile, owner Lee Stern entered discussions with representatives of Halo Advertising Specialties that would see them initially become a minor shareholder but have a controlling interest in the franchise within two years, although this ultimately came to nothing.

== The Nickel man (Joseph Vitell) ==
In 1988, Lee Stern stated after a leading 7-2 and finishing out on the bottom of the score card with a 8–7 loss against Kansas City that he would sell the team for a nickel. Joseph Vitell at the time 48 years old and an attorney took him up on the offer. Vitell gave Stern a nickel during the half time of the next game and sent a 5-cent check to the Stings office. Joseph Vitell has the record for cheapest professional sports team purchase.

== Sting withdraw from MISL ==
The Sting were experiencing financial challenges through the 1987–88 MISL season. In the spring of 1988, the owners explored the possibility of moving to Denver.

A few weeks after the end of the 1987–88 season, in July 1988, owner Lee Stern announced that the Sting had withdrawn from the MISL, citing falling attendances, failure to find new investors and concerns that the league was on the verge of collapse. Occurring the same week that the USA were awarded the 1994 World Cup Finals, Stern stated "Soccer will be back. With the World Cup coming to this country in 1994, interest will be high. The Sting will be involved somehow, some way".

== Media Coverage ==
The Sting had no television coverage the first two seasons. There were two matches televised in 1977, the away match vs the New York Cosmos, carried on WTTW the Public Broadcasting Service station, and the away match vs San Jose, nationally televised in syndication and carried locally by WMAQ-TV. WGN-TV would carry a handful of away games, starting in 1978, with a brief interruption in 1980 (filled by WFLD), before returning one last season in 1981. SportsVision began carrying the Sting in 1982, and continued until the end in 1988. Howard Balson was the primary play-by-play man throughout, with several analysts, most notably Kenny Stern (the owner's son). Radio would get a late start the first season, with WOJO(then an English language station) providing home game coverage (plus a late season match in St. Louis) from about a month into the season. Howard Balson and Les Grobstein would provide commentary. There would be a very late start to radio coverage in 1976, it would not be until the last month of the season that away games would be broadcast on WWMM-FM, plus the one playoff match. Grobstein was listed as sole commentator according to the source, but a later source would indicate Balson had been announcing the Sting for 6 seasons, including 1976. The Sting would finally get full season coverage in 1977, when WTAQ, WVFV-FM and WLNR-FM would begin. Balson would be joined by Michael Haggerty and Sam Donnelly. WLNR-FM would be replaced by WWMM-FM after 1977. WCFL would broadcast the 1980 season after carrying some matches in 1979, including the playoffs. Balson would return and be joined for TV by Roy Leonard and Chuck Swirsky on radio, with Kenny Stern on TV for the second season running. WOJO would carry home matches in Spanish starting then. For the championship season in 1981, WXFM would carry the matches, with selected games on WONX. WGN (AM) would carry the Soccer Bowl vs New York. Balson again was primary announcer throughout.

== Year-by-year results ==
=== Outdoor ===
Year	Record	Regular-season finish	Playoffs	Avg. attendance
1975	12–10	2nd, Central Division	Did not qualify	4,330
1976	15–9	1st, Northern Division, Atlantic Conference	Division Championships	5,801
1977	10–16	4th, Northern Division, Atlantic Conference	Did not qualify	5,199
1978	12–18	2nd, Central Division, American Conference	First round	4,188
1979	16–14	2nd, Central Division, American Conference	American Conference Semifinals	8,036
1980	21–11	1st, Central Division, American Conference	First round	11,672
1981	23–9	1st, Central Division	NASL Champions	12,889
1982	13–19	4th, Eastern Division	Did not qualify	9,377
1983	15–15	2nd, Eastern Division	Quarterfinals	10,937
1984	13–11	1st, Eastern Division	NASL Champions	8,376

=== Indoor ===
Season	League	Record	Regular-season finish	Playoffs	Avg. attendance
1976	NASL	1–1	(two-tiered, 12 team tournament)	did not advance	1,700
1980–81	NASL	13–5	1st, Central Division	Runners-up	6,164
1981–82	NASL	12–6	1st, Central Division	First round	13,322
1982–83	MISL	28–20	3rd, Eastern Division	First round	9,201
1983–84	NASL	20–12	2nd	First round	11,974
1984–85	MISL	28–20	2nd, Eastern Division	First round	10,628
1985–86	MISL	23–25	6th, Eastern Division	Did not qualify	7,345
1986–87	MISL	23–29	5th, Eastern Division	Did not qualify	5,879
1987–88	MISL	24–32	5th, Eastern Division	Did not qualify	5,977

== Honors ==
NASL championships (2)

- 1981, 1984
- 1980–81 Indoor (runner up)

NASL Season Premierships (2)

- 1980–81 Indoor
- 1984

Division titles (6)

- 1976 Northern Division, Atlantic Conference
- 1980 Central Division, National Conference
- 1980–81 Central Division Indoor
- 1981 Central Division
- 1981–82 Central Division Indoor
- 1984 Eastern Division

Transatlantic Challenge Cup

- 1982

Coach of the Year

- 1981 Willy Roy

All-Star Game MVP

- 1983–84 Karl-Heinz Granitza (4 goals)

Leading Scorer

- 1980–81 Karl-Heinz Granitza (111 points)

Leading goal scorer

- 1980–81 Karl-Heinz Granitza (42 goals)

Hall of Fame members

- United States: Rudy Getzinger, Karl-Heinz Granitza, Willy Roy, Lee Stern, Clive Toye, Bruce Wilson
- Canada: Tony Chursky, Gerry Gray, Victor Kodelja, John McGrane, Bruce Wilson
- Indoor Soccer: Victor Nogueira, Pato Margetic

All-Star first team selections

- 1975 Gordon Hill
- 1979 Bruce Wilson
- 1980 Phil Parkes
- 1981 Frantz Mathieu, Arno Steffenhagen
- 1980–81 Karl-Heinz Granitza
- 1981–82 Karl-Heinz Granitza
- 1982 Arno Steffenhagen
- 1983 Pato Margetic
- 1983–84 Karl-Heinz Granitza, Victor Nogueira
- 1984 Karl-Heinz Granitza
- 1984–85 Karl-Heinz Granitza

All-Star second team selections

- 1978 Bruce Wilson
- 1979 Karl-Heinz Granitza, Arno Steffenhagen
- 1980 Karl-Heinz Granitza
- 1981 Karl-Heinz Granitza
- 1982 Karl-Heinz Granitza, Pato Margetic
- 1983 Ricardo Alonso, Young Jeung Cho, Karl-Heinz Granitza
- 1983–84 Pato Margetic
- 1984 Pato Margetic

All-Star honorable mentions

- 1977 Willie Morgan
- 1978 Karl-Heinz Granitza, Jørgen Kristensen
- 1979 Jørgen Kristensen
- 1980 Frantz Mathieu
- 1981 Dave Huson, Pato Margetic
- 1982–83 Pato Margetic
- 1983 Dave Huson
- 1984–85 Gerry Gray
- 1986–87 Nílton Batata

== Head coaches ==
- (England) Bill Foulkes (1975–1977)
- (United States) Willy Roy (1977–1986)
- (England) Malcolm Musgrove (1978)
- (Germany) Erich Geyer (1986–1988)
- (United States) Gary Hindley (1988)

== Bibliography ==
- Basil G. Kane. The Official Chicago Sting Book. Contemporary Books, Inc. ISBN 0-8092-5634-7.
