= Pato Margetic =

Argentine footballer

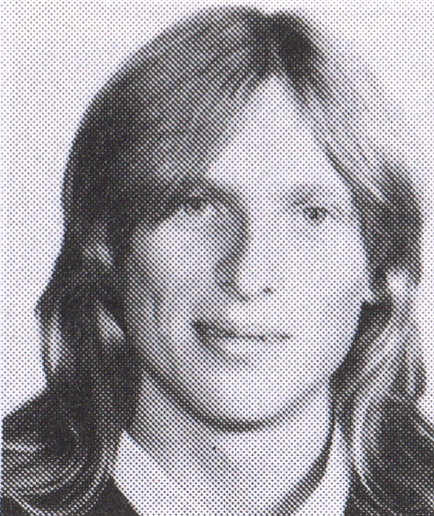
- Margetic in 1984

Personal information
- Full name: Patricio Germán Margetic
- Date of birth: May 17, 1960 (age 66)
- Place of birth: Avellaneda, Argentina
- Height: 5 ft 11 in (1.80 m)
- Position: Striker

Senior career*
Years	Team	Apps	(Gls)
1978	San Telmo		
1979	Temperley		
1979–1981	Detroit Express (indoor)	20	(36)
1980	Detroit Express	32	(11)
1981–1984	Chicago Sting	98	(31)
1981–1985	Chicago Sting (indoor)	74	(74)
1985–1987	Kansas City Comets (indoor)	69	(36)
1987–1988	Chicago Sting (indoor)	41	(13)
1988–1989	Borussia Dortmund	2	(0)
1989–1990	Cleveland Crunch (indoor)	33	(12)
1990	Tacoma Stars (indoor)	13	(4)
1990–1994	Chicago Power (indoor)	143	(129)
1994–1999	Detroit Rockers (indoor)	160	(102)
- * Club domestic league appearances and goals

Patricio "Pato" Germán Margetic (born May 17, 1960, in Avellaneda, Argentina) is a former Argentine footballer. He began his career in Argentina before playing five seasons in the North American Soccer League, as well as the Major Indoor Soccer League.

== Playing career ==
Margetic's professional career began in 1978 for San Telmo from the Isla Maciel district of Avellaneda.

He came to the United States to play for the Detroit Express in 1979 and then moved on to the Chicago Sting in 1981, where he went on to win NASL Soccer Bowls in 1981 and 1984. He was a first team all star in 1983, a second team selection in 1982 and 1984, and an honorable mention in 1981. While playing for the Sting he earned the nickname "Magic Man". Margetic played in 130 NASL games, scoring 42 goals and 59 assists for 143 points, which ranks him 34th all-time in the league. Margetic scored the last goal in the history of the NASL in the 82nd minute of game two of the 1984 Soccer Bowl series. After the end of the NASL, Margetic played six seasons in the Major Indoor Soccer League for the Chicago Sting, Kansas City Comets, Cleveland Crunch and Tacoma Stars, and nine seasons in the National Professional Soccer League for the Chicago Power and Detroit Rockers. He also appeared briefly for Borussia Dortmund in 1988–89.

== Coaching ==
He has spent the past several years running Pato's Magic Soccer, a Michigan non-profit promoting youth soccer affiliated with the Michigan Youth Soccer League and the Michigan State Premier Soccer Program. He also does recruiting for the Chicago Fire. He now coaches and heads the Magic Soccer Club in Michigan. Pato and Magic Soccer Club partner with camps and classes running through the Rochester Avon Recreation Authority (RARA) in Rochester, MI. RARA is the recreation department for Rochester and Rochester Hills, Michigan.
