= Karl-Heinz Granitza =

German footballer

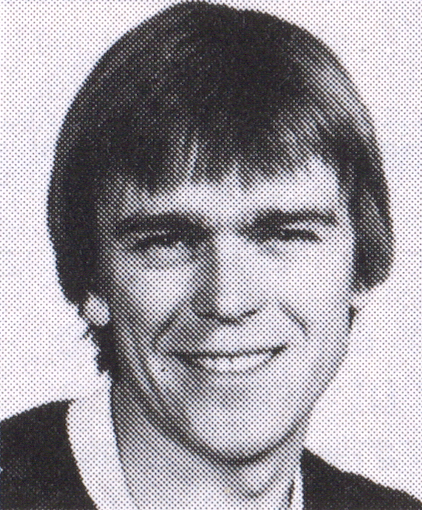
- Granitza circa 1984

Personal information
- Date of birth: 1 November 1951 (age 74)
- Place of birth: Lünen, West Germany
- Position: Forward

Youth career
- –1959: VfB Lünen
- 1959–1970: Eintracht Dortmund

Senior career*
Years	Team	Apps	(Gls)
1970–1972	Eintracht Dortmund		
1972–1973	Lüner SV	23	(4)
1973–1975	DJK Gütersloh	50	(16)
1975–1976	SV Röchling Völklingen	45	(32)
1976–1979	Hertha BSC	73	(34)
1978–1984	Chicago Sting	199	(128)
1982–1987	Chicago Sting (indoor)	174	(168)
1988–1990	Chicago Power	53	(97)
- * Club domestic league appearances and goals

Karl-Heinz Granitza (born 1 November 1951) is a German former professional footballer who played as a forward. In the United States, he is a member of the National Soccer Hall of Fame.

Granitza was born in Lünen, North Rhine-Westphalia. He played in Germany for VfB Lünen, Eintracht Dortmund, Lüner SV, DJK Gütersloh, SV Röchling Völklingen and Hertha BSC. In 1978 and again for the 1979 season, he transferred to the Chicago Sting of the NASL, leading the team to two league championships. He also excelled at the indoor game. Granitza was known for his powerful and accurate left foot. He was also very effective with direct free kicks, having the ability to strike the ball with top spin over the wall of defenders, and into the upper corners of the goal. He would finish as the NASL's second all-time leading scorer.

In the 1990s Granitza owned "State Street", an American-style sports bar in Berlin.

In 2003, Granitza was inducted into the National Soccer Hall of Fame. His #12 shirt has been retired by the Chicago Storm.
