= Rudy Glenn =

American soccer player and coach

Personal information
- Date of birth: October 12, 1958 (age 68)
- Place of birth: Lawton, Oklahoma, U.S.
- Positions: Midfielder; defender

Youth career
- 1976–1979: Indiana University

Senior career*
Years	Team	Apps	(Gls)
1980–1982	Chicago Sting	83	(10)
1981–1986	Chicago Sting (indoor)	128	(42)
1983	Team America	25	(2)
1984	Chicago Sting	23	(3)
1986–1987	Chicago Shoccers (indoor)		

International career
1984	United States	1	(0)
1987	U.S. Futsal	5	(1)

Managerial career
- Highland Park High School
- Niles West High School (assistant)
- * Club domestic league appearances and goals

Rudy Glenn (born October 12, 1958) is an American retired soccer player who coaches youth soccer.

== High school and college ==
Glenn attended Mannheim American High School in Mannheim, Germany . He attended Indiana University from 1976 to 1979 where he played on the men's soccer team. During Glenn's four years with the team, it went to the NCAA championship in 1976 and 1978. Indiana lost in both games to the University of San Francisco. However, USF was later disqualified from the 1978 championship.

== Professional career ==
The Chicago Sting of the North American Soccer League (NASL) took Glenn in the first round (third overall) in the 1979 NASL College Draft. Glenn became an excellent defender with the Sting. He scored the winning goal in the shootout Penalty shootout (football)#American experiments phase of the 1981 NASL championship game, which had end without a goal after 90 minutes of regulation and 15 minutes of golden goal extra time. In 1983, the U.S. Soccer Federation, in coordination with the NASL, entered the U.S. national team, known as Team America, into the NASL as a league franchise. The team drew on U.S. citizens playing in the NASL, Major Indoor Soccer League and American Soccer League. Glenn left the Sting and signed with Team America. When Team America finished the 1983 season with a 10–20 record, the worst in the NASL, USSF withdrew the team from the league. Glenn returned to the Sting and remained with the team until he retired from playing. In 1984, the Sting won a second NASL championship, the last in the league's history. At the end of the season, the NASL folded and the Sting moved to Major Indoor Soccer League (MISL). Glenn remained with the Sting and played two years in MISL. During the 1985–1986 season, he played only eight games, scoring one goal, before he was injured. He was released by the Sting on May 1, 1986. In October 1986, Glenn joined the Chicago Shoccers of the American Indoor Soccer Association.

== National team ==
In 1984, Glenn earned his only cap with the national team as a substitute for Andy Parkinson in a 0–0 tie with Italy. In 1987, Glenn also played five games, scoring one goal for the U.S. Futsal Team.

== Post-playing career ==
Glenn coached boys sophomore soccer at Niles West High School and girls varsity soccer coach at Niles West High School. Rudy is also the founder of Illinois Sting FC, the girls feeder soccer team for Niles West High School. He now currently coaches Wilmette's Loyola Academy Boys Soccer Team as of 2025.
