= List of people from St. Louis =

Notable people from St. Louis City and County, Missouri

This is a list of notable people from St. Louis or St. Louis County in the U.S. state of Missouri. The dates in parentheses represent lifespan, not necessarily dates of actual residence in the city.

== A ==
- Janet Adair (c. 1892–1938), vaudeville and musical comedy performer
- Akon (born 1973), real name Aliaune Damala Badara Akon Thiam, musician
- Matt Alber (born 1975), singer-songwriter, musician
- Wilhelm Albers (1840–1904), Wisconsin state assemblyman
- Devon Alexander (born 1987), professional boxer, IBF welterweight world champion
- Mike Ambersley (born 1983), soccer player
- Gary Amlong (born 1962), indoor soccer player
- Raleigh DeGeer Amyx (1938–2019), collector of Olympic and presidential memorabilia
- Maya Angelou (1928–2014), poet, playwright, memoirist (I Know Why the Caged Bird Sings)
- Eberhard Anheuser (1805–1880), businessman, owner of company that would become Anheuser-Busch
- Robert Annis (1928–1995), soccer player, National Soccer Hall of Fame inductee, and 1948 Olympian
- Donald K. Anton (born 1960), chair of International Law at Griffith University
- Henry Armstrong (1912–1988), professional boxer, welterweight champion 1938–1940
- Brandon Aubrey (born 1995), soccer and National Football League player
- Dick Ault (1925–2007), track and field athlete

== B ==
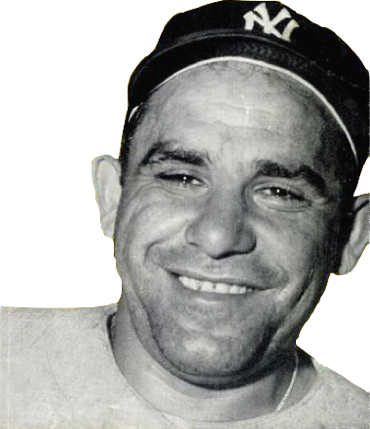
Yogi Berra, member of the Baseball Hall of Fame

- Charlie Babb (born 1950), former safety for the Miami Dolphins, 1972–1979
- King Baggot (1879–1948), actor and film director
- Josephine Baker (1906–1975), dancer, singer, actress, Légion d'Honneur appointee, civil rights activist
- Pat Baker (born 1962), soccer player
- Scott Bakula (born 1954), actor (Quantum Leap, Star Trek: Enterprise)
- James F. Ballard (1851–1931), pharmaceutical entrepreneur, and art collector
- Charles Balmer (1817–1892), German-born American musician, conductor, composer, music publisher
- Brandon Barklage (born 1986), soccer player
- Thomas P. Barnett (1870–1929), architect and impressionist painter
- Tom Barlow (born 1995), soccer player
- Fontella Bass (1940–2012), soul and R&B singer ("Rescue Me")
- Bradley Beal (born 1993), guard for the Phoenix Suns of the National Basketball Association
- Donald Beardslee (1943–2005), serial killer executed in California
- Raymond Beckman (1925–2011), soccer player and 1948 Olympian
- Cool Papa Bell (1903–1991), Negro league baseball player, Hall of Fame member
- Katherine Bernhardt (born 1975), artist, painter
- Robert Benecke (1835–1903), early photographer
- Graham Bensinger (born 1986), sports journalist for ESPN Radio
- Sally Benson (1897–1972), author whose short stories became the book, then movie, Meet Me in St. Louis
- John Berner (born 1991), soccer player
- Yogi Berra (1925–2015), Major League Baseball player (New York Yankees 1946–1963), manager, coach, Hall of Famer
- Chuck Berry (1926–2017), Rock and Roll Hall of Fame musician and composer ("Johnny B. Goode")
- Fred Berry (1951–2003), actor (What's Happening!!)
- Bill Bertani (1919–1988), soccer player and 1948 Olympian
- Joe Besser (1907–1988), actor, comedian, member of The Three Stooges
- Alan Best (1906–1953), Illinois state representative
- Sam Bick (born 1955), soccer player
- Justin Bilyeu (born 1994), soccer player
- Jud Birza (born 1989), model, winner of Survivor: Nicaragua
- Linda Blair (born 1959), actress (The Exorcist)
- Fred Blassie (1918–2003), professional wrestler
- Sean Blakemore (born 1967), actor, Shawn Butler on ABC's General Hospital
- Henry Blossom (1866–1919), novelist and playwright, opera librettist, and lyricist for Broadway musicals
- Susan Blow (1843–1916), educator, opened first successful public kindergarten in the U.S.
- Jim Bokern (born 1952), soccer player, coach, and businessman
- Jason Bolden (born 1982), celebrity fashion stylist and television personality
- Michele Boldrin (born 1956), Italian-American politician, economist, academic
- Ryan Bollman (born 1972), actor
- Dave Boncek (born 1963), soccer player
- Kit Bond (born 1939), U.S. senator from Missouri
- Metro Boomin (born 1993), record producer
- Daniel Boone (1734–1820), explorer, hunter, soldier, businessman, politician
- Frank Borghi (1925–2015), soccer player
- Medric Boucher (1886–1974), MLB and soccer player
- Evan Bourne (born 1983), WWE professional wrestler
- Barney Boyce (born 1960), soccer player and coach
- Devin Boyce (born 1996), soccer player
- Bob Bozada (born 1959), soccer player and coach
- Cliff Brady (1897–1974), MLB and soccer player
- Joseph Brady, soccer player and 1904 Olympian
- Dylan Brady (born 1993), musician
- Kate J. Brainard (1835–1918), musical educator originally from New York City
- David Brcic, soccer player and 1984 Olympian
- Martin Stanislaus Brennan (1845–1927), Catholic priest and scientist
- Christine Brewer (born 1955), Grammy Award winner, soprano
- Lottie Briscoe (1883–1950), stage and silent film actress
- Warren Brittingham (1886–1962), soccer player and 1904 Olympian
- Lou Brock (1939–2020), Major League Baseball player (St. Louis Cardinals 1964–1979), Hall of Famer
- Shirley Brown (born 1947), soul/R&B singer ("Woman to Woman")
- Sterling K. Brown (born 1976), actor
- Steve Brown (born 1962), darts player
- Terry Brown (born 1964), soccer player
- Will Bruin (born 1989), soccer player
- Butch Buchholz (born 1940), Hall of Fame tennis player
- Jack Buck (1924–2002), Hall of Fame sportscaster, St. Louis Cardinals' announcer 1954–2002
- Joe Buck (born 1969), sportscaster, football and baseball announcer for Fox, son of Jack Buck
- Joaquin Buckley (born 1994), mixed martial arts fighter
- Mark Buehrle (born 1979), Major League Baseball pitcher (Chicago White Sox, Toronto Blue Jays)
- William M. Bugg (1931–2026), physicist
- Grace Bumbry (born 1937), opera singer
- Nelle G. Burger (1869–1957), president, Missouri State Woman's Christian Temperance Union
- Bob Burkard (1922–1992), soccer player and 1952 Olympian
- T Bone Burnett (born 1948), rock and country performer, composer, and producer
- William S. Burroughs (1914–1997), novelist, social critic, spoken-word performer; grandson of inventor William Seward Burroughs I
- William Seward Burroughs I (1855–1898), inventor of the adding machine, founder of Burroughs Corporation; grandfather of novelist William S. Burroughs
- Adolphus Busch (1839–1913), co-founder of Anheuser-Busch with father-in-law Eberhard Anheuser
- Adolphus Busch III (1891–1946), president and CEO of Anheuser-Busch; son of August Anheuser Busch Sr.
- August Anheuser Busch Sr. (1865–1934), president and CEO of Anheuser-Busch; son of Adolphus Busch
- Gussie Busch (August Anheuser Busch, Jr.) (1899–1989), president and CEO of Anheuser-Busch, civic leader, philanthropist
- August Busch III (born 1937), president and CEO of Anheuser-Busch, civic leader
- August Busch IV (born 1964), president and CEO of Anheuser-Busch, civic leader
- Cori Bush (born 1976), U.S. representative from Missouri
- Champ Butler (1926–1992), singer
- Norbert Leo Butz (born 1967), Tony Award-winning actor
- Bobby Byrne (1884–1964), MLB and soccer player
- Jim Byrnes (born 1948), actor and musician (Wiseguy, Highlander: The Series)

== C ==
- Jeff Cacciatore (born 1958), soccer player
- Steve Cacciatore (born 1954), soccer player
- Thomas Cahill (1864–1951), athlete, coach, businessman; a founding father of American soccer
- Haydee Campbell (d. 1921), kindergarten pioneer in St. Louis
- Kate Capshaw (born 1953), actress (Indiana Jones and the Temple of Doom), wife of Steven Spielberg
- Chip Caray (born 1965), sportscaster for Chicago Cubs, Atlanta Braves and Fox
- Harry Caray (1914–1998), sportscaster, lead announcer for the St. Louis Cardinals (1945–1969) and Chicago Cubs (1981–1997)
- Skip Caray (1939–2008), sportscaster, announcer for the Atlanta Braves (1976–2008)
- Chris Carenza (born 1952), soccer player
- John Carenza (1950–2023), soccer player and 1972 Olympian
- Joe Carenza Sr. (1924–1981), soccer player, coach, and National Soccer Hall of Fame inductee
- Nathaniel L. Carpenter (1805-1892), businessman
- Nell Carter (1948–2003), Tony Award-winning singer and actress (Ain't Misbehavin')
- Matt Caution (born 1974), soccer player
- Lucille Cavanagh (1895–1983), vaudeville dancer, later columnist for the Los Angeles Times
- Cedric the Entertainer (born 1964), actor and comedian
- Louis Cella (1866–1918), capitalist, real estate mogul, turfman, and political financier
- Lori Chalupny (born 1984), soccer player who represented the United States women's national team
- Jean Baptiste Charbonneau (1805–1866), explorer, guide, fur trader, military scout, mayor, and gold prospector, born to Sacagawea during the Lewis and Clark Expedition and raised in St. Louis by William Clark
- John Cheatham (1855–1918), firefighter
- C. J. Cherryh (born 1942), science-fiction novelist
- Chingy (born 1980), real name Howard Bailey, Jr., hip-hop recording artist and actor
- Kate Chopin (1851–1904), novelist (The Awakening)
- Auguste Chouteau (1740–1829), co-founder of St. Louis, urban planner, businessman, civic leader
- David Clarenbach (born 1953), member of Wisconsin State Assembly
- Tim Clark (born 1959), soccer player
- William Clark (1770–1838), explorer, government administrator
- Joe Clarke (born 1953), soccer player and coach
- Sarah Clarke (born 1972), actress (24)
- Dianne White Clatto (1938-2015), first Black weathercaster in the United States
- Eddie Clear (1944–2022), soccer player who represented the United States national team
- A. J. Cochran (born 1993), soccer player
- Mac Cody (born 1972), football player in NFL, CFL, AFL
- Cynthia Coffman (born 1962), murderer
- Andy Cohen (born 1968), television executive and personality at Bravo network, one of the first openly gay talk-show hosts
- Yuri Collins (born 2001), basketball player
- Charlie Colombo (1920–1986), soccer player who represented the United States national team
- Barry Commoner (1917–2012), biologist, college professor, eco-socialist, and presidential candidate
- Arthur Compton (1892–1962), physicist, Nobel Prize in Physics 1927
- Ralph Compton (born 1935), electrical engineer
- Jimmy Connors (born 1952), professional tennis player, 5-time U.S. Open winner in men's singles
- Bert Convy (1933–1991), actor and game-show host
- Elwood Cook (1929–1994), soccer player who represented the United States national team
- George E. Cooke (1883–1969), soccer player and 1904 Olympian
- Thomas Cooke (1885–1964), soccer player and 1904 Olympian
- Sam Coonrod (born 1992), major league pitcher
- Carl Ferdinand Cori (1896–1984); Gerty Cori (1896–1957), biochemists, joint Nobel Prize in Physiology or Medicine 1947
- Zlatko Ćosić (born 1972), artist and filmmaker
- Bob Costas (born 1952), sportscaster, talk-show host
- Bryan Cox (born 1968), NFL linebacker 1991–2002
- Jim Cox (1920–2014), professional football player
- Lavell Crawford (born 1968), stand-up comedian, actor
- Anton Crihan (1893–1993), Romanian politician, professor at University of Paris (Sorbonne)
- Jasmine Crockett (born 1981), U.S. representative for Texas
- James Cuno (born 1951), art historian and museum director

== D ==
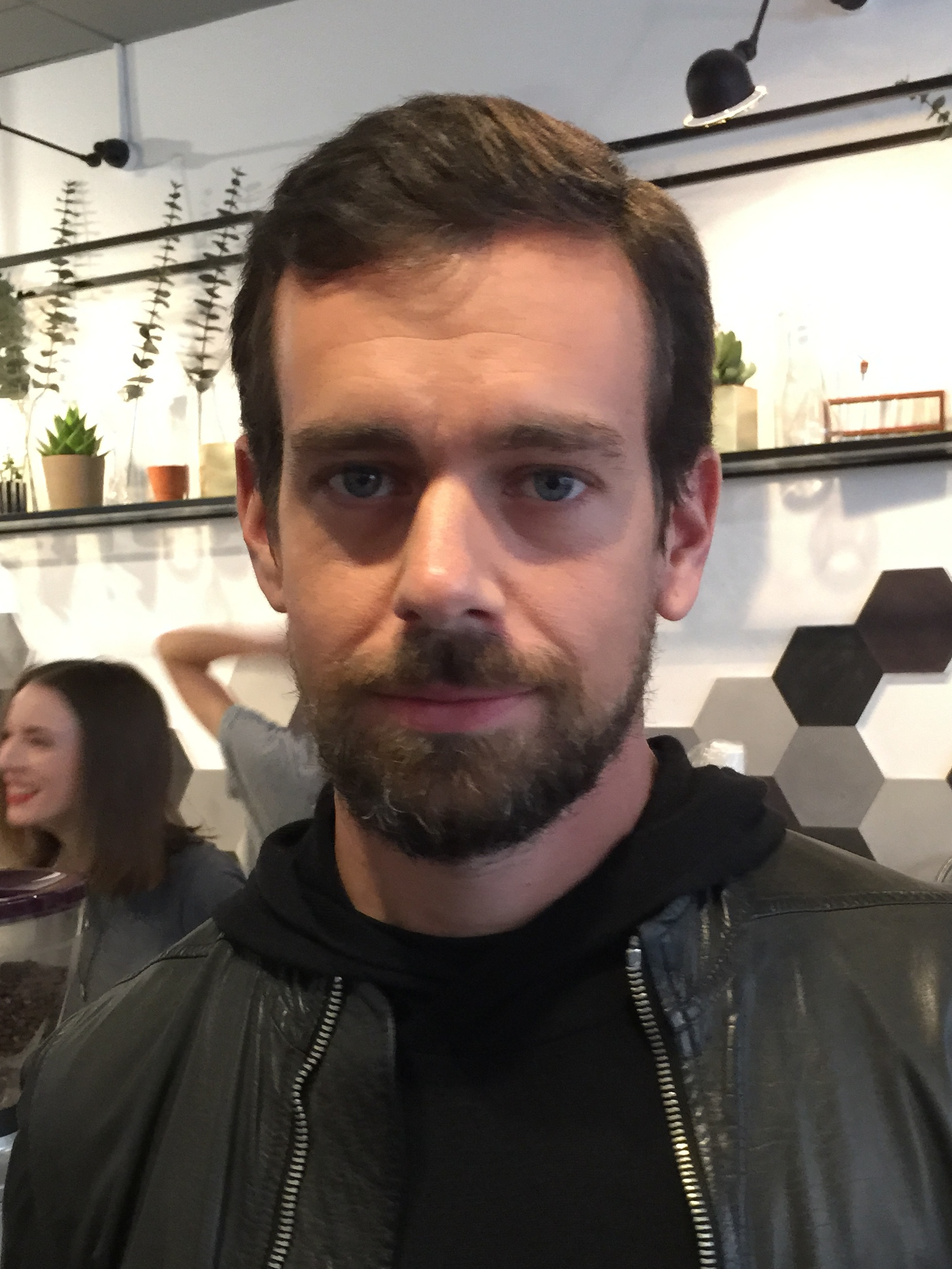
Jack Dorsey, co-founder of Twitter and Block

- Paul Dana (1975–2006), IndyCar Series driver
- John Danforth (born 1936), statesman, diplomat, attorney, civic leader, U.S. senator 1977–1995
- William H. Danforth (1870–1956), founder of Ralston Purina Company; grandfather of John Danforth and William H. "Bill" Danforth
- William H. "Bill" Danforth (1926–2020), physician, professor of medicine, and chancellor of Washington University in St. Louis 1971–1995
- Billy Davis Jr. (born 1938), R&B and soul singer, member of The 5th Dimension
- Brad Davis (born 1981), professional soccer player
- Dwight F. Davis (1879–1945), athlete, government administrator
- Martin Jay Davis (1937–2022), astrologer, author, and Olympic fencer
- Miles Davis (1926–1991), jazz composer and musician, winner of Grammy Lifetime Achievement Award
- April Daye (born 1937), burlesque dancer, fine arts painter, recording artist and jazz singer
- Dizzy Dean (1910–1974), baseball pitcher, broadcaster
- Dan Dierdorf (born 1949), football player, broadcaster
- Phyllis Diller (1917–2012), comedian
- John Doerr (born 1951), venture capitalist
- Domino (born 1972), real name Shawn Antoine Ivy, rapper, born in St. Louis
- Colin Donnell (born 1982), actor, Arrow
- Thom Donovan (born 1974), musician (Lapush)
- Don Doran (born 1954), retired professional soccer player
- Jack Dorsey (born 1976), software architect and businessperson, creator of Twitter and Square
- Bob Dotson (born 1946), broadcast journalist, NBC correspondent
- Tyler Downs (born 2003), U.S. Olympic diver
- Dora Doxey (1879–1921), accused of murder in 1909; found not guilty
- Katherine Dunham (1909–2006), dancer
- Tim Dunigan (born 1955), actor
- Mary Alice Dwyer-Dobbin (fl. 1972 – c. ??), television producer

== E ==
- James Eads (1820–1887), engineer
- Thomas Eagleton (1929–2007), statesman, attorney, civic leader
- Charles Eames (1907–1978), designer, filmmaker
- William C. Edenborn (1848–1926), industrialist and inventor
- Jonathan Edwards (born 1944), singer member of The Spinners
- T. S. Eliot (1888–1965), poet (Nobel Prize, Presidential Medal of Freedom), critic
- William Greenleaf Eliot (1811–1887), educator, medical reformer, civil rights activist; grandfather of T. S. Eliot
- Ezekiel Elliott (born 1995), Professional Football player Dallas Cowboys
- Stanley Elkin (1930–1995), author
- Mary Engelbreit (born 1952), artist
- Glennon Engleman (1927–1999), hitman
- Haim Fishel Epstein (1874–1942), rabbi
- Michael Evans (1944–2005), photographer who served as the Chief Official White House Photographer
- Walker Evans (1903–1975), photographer
- Steve Ewing (fl. 1987 – c. ??), singer/actor, The Urge

== F ==
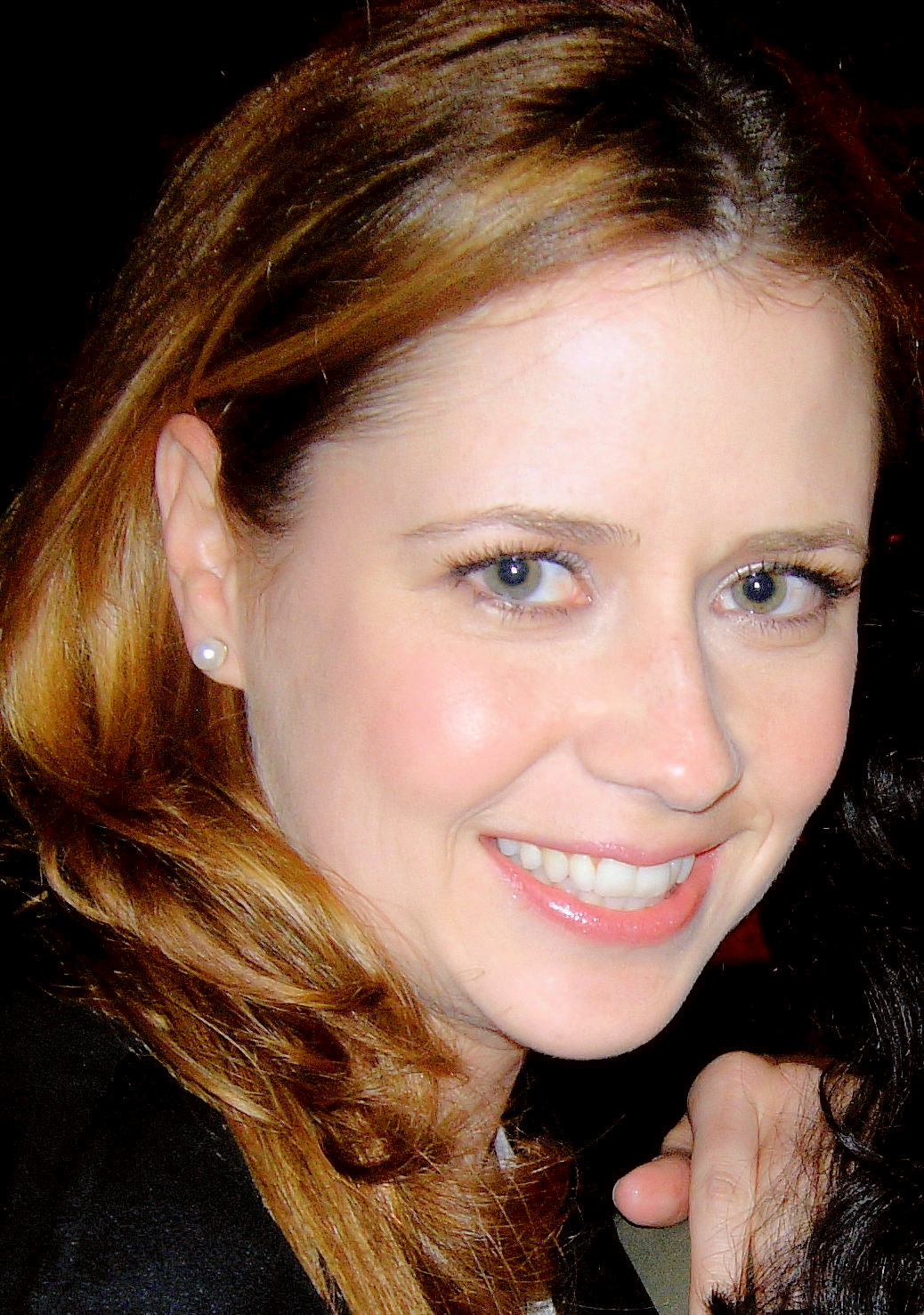
Jenna Fischer, actress best known for her portrayel of Pam Beesly on The Office

- Max Factor (1904–1996), cosmetics maker
- Lee Falk (1911–1999), comic strip creator
- Eugene Field (1850–1895), author
- Shandi Finnessey (born 1978), Miss USA 2004
- Jenna Fischer (born 1974), actress
- Jamar Fletcher (born 1979), professional football player
- Jason Fletcher (born 1975), sports agent
- Ellen Foley (born 1951), singer, actress
- Mike Ford (born 1995), professional football player
- Richard Fortus (born 1966), musician, Guns N' Roses
- Redd Foxx (1922–1991), comedian, actor
- Malcolm Frager (1935–1991), concert pianist
- James Franciscus (1934–1991), actor (Mr. Novak, Longstreet)
- Clint Frank (1915–1992), college football halfback, Heisman Trophy winner in 1937
- Mary Frann (1943–1998), actress (Newhart)
- Jonathan Franzen (born 1959), author
- Trent Frederic (born 1998), ice hockey player
- David Freese (born 1983), baseball player
- Tom Friedman (born 1965), artist

== G ==
- Bob Gale (born 1951), screenwriter, film producer
- Alberta Gallatin (1861–1948), stage and screen actress, raised in St. Louis
- Charles Henry Galloway (1871–1931), St. Louis organist, choral conductor, educator, and composer
- Pud Galvin (1856–1902), Major League Baseball player
- Joe Garagiola (1926–2016), baseball player, sportscaster, television personality, author
- Jan Garavaglia (born 1956), chief Mmedical examiner of the District 9 Morgue in Orlando, Florida; television personality
- Dave Garroway (1913–1982), television personality, first host of NBC's Today Show
- William H. Gass (1924–2017), author, critic
- Martha Gellhorn (1908–1998), author and journalist; third wife of Ernest Hemingway
- Richard Gephardt (born 1941), politician
- Steve Gerber (1947–2008), comic-book writer, co-creator of Howard the Duck
- Virginia Gibson (1925–2013), dancer, singer, actress
- Frances Ginsberg (1955–2010), opera singer
- David Giuntoli (born 1981), actor
- Nikki Glaser (born 1984), comedian
- Vera Glaser (1916–2008), journalist and feminist
- William J. Glasgow (1866–1967), US Army brigadier general, born and raised in St. Louis
- Martin Goldsmith (born 1952), music writer and radio personality
- Jerry Gollub (1944–2019), physicist
- John Goodman (born 1952), actor
- Harry Goz (1932–2003), actor, Sealab 2021
- Betty Grable (1916–1973), actress
- Mary Olstine Graham (1842–1902), educator who led the largest normal school in Argentina
- Ulysses S. Grant (1822–1885), 18th US president
- Grant Green (1935–1979), jazz guitarist
- Trent Green (born 1970), football player
- Frank S. Greene (1938–2009), Semiconductor researcher and technologist
- Dick Gregory (1932–2017), author, comedian, civil rights
- Eric Greitens (born 1974), 56th governor of Missouri
- Kim Gruenenfelder (fl. 1992 – c. ??), author
- Charles Guenther (1920–2008), poet, translator, newspaper critic
- Robert Guillaume (1927–2017), Grammy and Emmy Award-winning actor
- James Gunn (born 1966), screenwriter, director
- Sean Gunn (born 1974), actor
- Moses Gunn (1929–1993), actor

== H ==
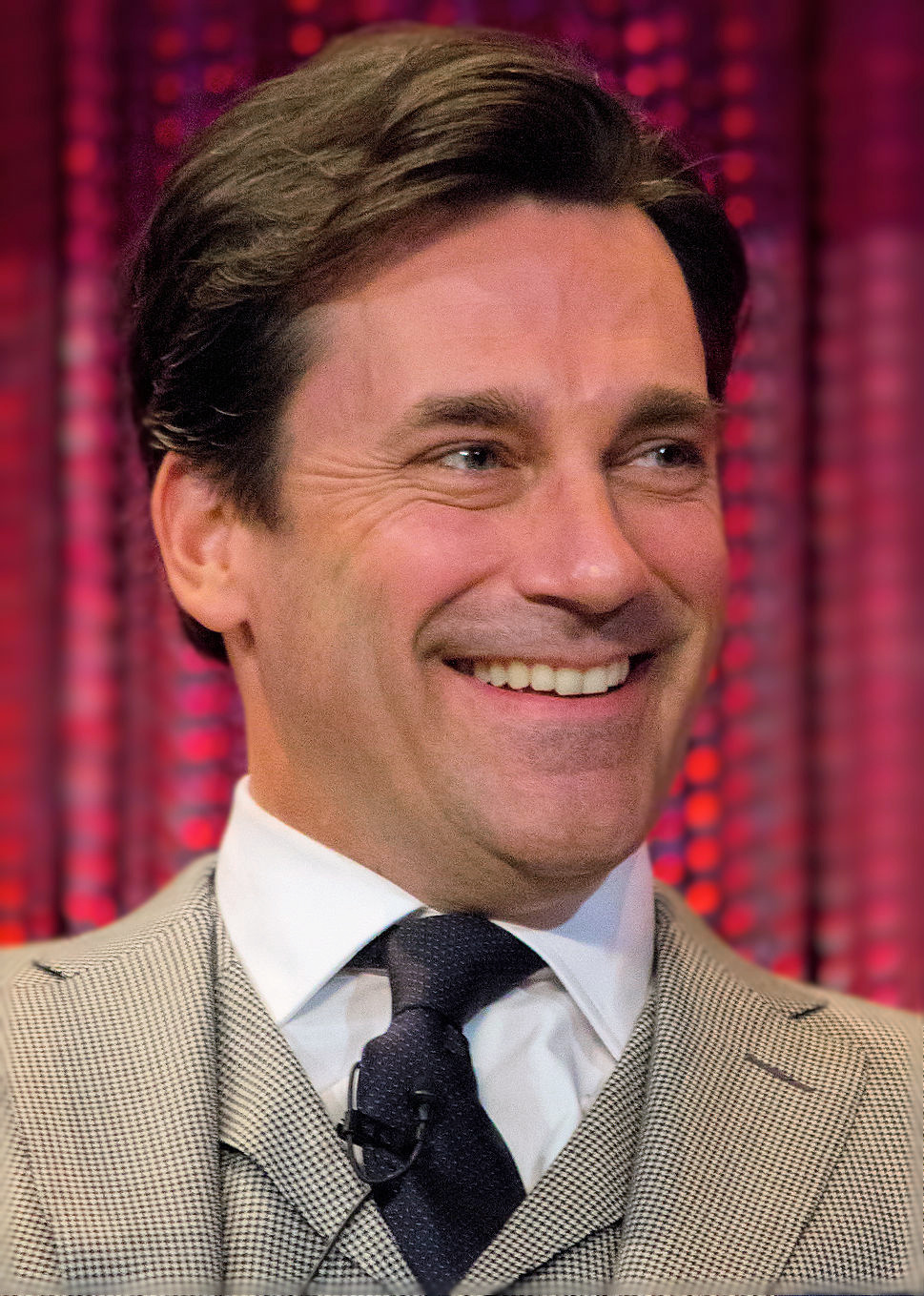
Jon Hamm, Golden Globe award-winning actor

- Emily Hahn (1905–1997), journalist, author
- Laurell K. Hamilton (born 1963), author
- Jon Hamm (born 1971), Golden Globe Award and Primetime Emmy Award award-winning actor, Mad Men
- Henry Hampton (1940–1998), film producer, Eyes on the Prize: America's Civil Rights Years (1954–1965) and Eyes on the Prize II: America at the Racial Crossroads (1965–1980s)
- Sally Hampton (born 1958), writer, producer
- Harry Hanebrink (1927–1996), Major League Baseball player. Milwaukee Braves (1953, 1957–1958)
- Chuck T. Harmon (born 1979), aka Chuck Harmony, music producer for Mary J. Blige, Celine Dion, Fantasia, Rihanna
- Doris Hart (1925–2015), Hall of Fame tennis player, two-time U.S. Open champion
- John Hartford (1937–2001), musician, Grammy Award winner
- Culver Hastedt (1883–1966), runner, gold medal winner at 1904 Summer Olympics
- Donny Hathaway (1945–1979), Grammy-winning singer, songwriter, producer, composer
- Pat Healy (born 1983), mixed martial arts fighter
- Bob Heil (born 1940), sound and radio engineer
- Julius Hemphill (1938–1995), jazz saxophonist, composer
- George E. Hibbard (1924–1991), art collector, advocate for Tibetan Independence
- George Hickenlooper (1963–2010), filmmaker
- Paul John Hilbert (1949–2001), member of the Texas House of Representatives
- Malcolm Hill (born 1995), American player in the Israel Basketball Premier League
- Al Hirschfeld (1903–2003), artist and cartoonist
- Bobby Hofman (1925–1994), Major League Baseball player
- Solly Hofman (1882–1956), Major League Baseball player
- Erin Marie Hogan (born 1985), actress and activist
- Robert A. Holekamp (1848–1922), businessman and apiarist
- Jessie Housley Holliman (1905–1984), educator, public muralist, artist
- William H. Holloman III (1924–2010), U.S. Army Air Force officer and combat fighter pilot with the Tuskegee Airmen; U.S. Air Force's first African American helicopter pilot
- August Holtz (1871–1938), United States Navy sailor, Medal of Honor recipient
- Ken Holtzman (born 1945), baseball pitcher
- A. E. Hotchner (1917–2020), author, editor, philanthropist
- Elston Howard (1929–1980), baseball player, first black player for New York Yankees
- Ryan Howard (born 1979), baseball player, 2005 NL Rookie of the Year, 2006 National League MVP and All-Star first baseman, Philadelphia Phillies
- Vince Howard (1929–2002), actor
- Huey (1987–2020), real name Lawrence Franks, Jr., rapper
- Larry Hughes (born 1979), basketball player, Chicago Bulls
- Eugenia Williamson Hume (1865–1899), elocutionist and educator

== I–J ==
- Vedad Ibišević (born 1984), Bosnian soccer player
- Eliza Buckley Ingalls (1848–1918), temperance activist
- William Inge (1913–1973), Pulitzer Prize-winning playwright
- Palestina "Tina" Isa (1972–1989), honor killing victim
- Ernie Isley (born 1952), songwriter, guitarist of soul and R&B group The Isley Brothers
- Ronald Isley (born 1941), lead singer of the Isley Brothers; co-owner of St. Louis-based Notifi Records
- Halsey Ives (1847–1911), museum and school founder, director of two world-fair art exhibitions (Louisiana Purchase Exposition and World's Columbian Exposition)
- J-Kwon (born 1986), real name Jerrell Jones, rapper
- Oliver Lee Jackson (born 1935), painter, sculptor, draftsman, and printmaker
- Sean James (born 1978), athlete
- Cam Janssen (born 1984), ice hockey player
- Ella Jenkins (1924–2024), musician
- Jibbs (born 1990), real name Jovan Campbell, rapper
- Jeremiah Johnson (born 1972), blues musician
- Johnnie Johnson (1924–2005), musician
- Scott Joplin (1867/1868–1917), songwriter (Pulitzer Prize), musician, "King of Ragtime"
- Jackie Joyner-Kersee (born 1962), Olympic gold-medalist track & field athlete; educator; sister of Olympic athlete Al Joyner; sister-in-law of Florence "Flo Jo" Griffith-Joyner

== K ==
- Kane (born 1967), real name Glenn Jacobs, professional wrestler
- Stan Kann (1924–2008), musician, entertainer
- Roe Kapara (born 1998), singer
- Terry Karl (born 1947), professor of Latin American Studies at Stanford University
- Bruce Karsh (born 1955), lawyer and investor
- Ben Kasica (born 1984), musician
- Karen Katen (born 1948), pharmaceutical executive
- Andreas Katsulas (1946–2006), actor (Babylon 5)
- David Kaufman (born 1961), character actor and voice actor (Danny Phantom)
- Jim Kekeris (1923–1997), NFL player
- Kipp Keller (born 2000), soccer player
- Ellie Kemper (born 1980), actress
- Dorothea Kent (1916–1990), film actress
- Dickie Kerr (1893–1963), baseball pitcher
- Al Kerth (1952–2002), public relations professional
- Imrat Khan (1935–2018), Indian classical musician
- Albert King (1923–1992), musician
- Silver King (1868–1938), Major League Baseball player
- Audrey Kissel (1926–2017), All-American Girls Professional Baseball League player
- Kevin Kline (born 1947), Academy Award-winning actor
- Karlie Kloss (born 1992), model
- Marquise Knox (born 1991), blues rock musician
- Chris Koster (born 1964), Attorney General of Missouri
- Shawn Krause, animator of Pixar Animation Studios
- Karyn Kusama (born 1968), filmmaker

== L ==
- Pierre Laclede (1729–1778), urban planner; co-founder of St. Louis; government administrator; civic leader
- Pokey Lafarge (born 1983), musician and singer
- Pat LaFontaine (born 1965), NHL hockey player
- Elizabeth Laime (born 1979), podcaster, writer
- Oliver Lake (born 1942), jazz saxophonist, composer
- Brad Lander (born 1969), New York state politician
- Christopher Largen (1969–2012), author, filmmaker, journalist, activist
- Jeannie Leavitt (born c. 1967), the United States Air Force's first female fighter pilot
- Bob Lee (1979–2023), murdered software engineer and technology entrepreneur
- David Lee (born 1983), NBA basketball player
- Jim Lee, comic-book artist, writer, editor, publisher; president and chief creative officer of DC Comics; founder of Wildstorm Productions and founding member of Image Comics
- Murphy Lee (1979), rapper
- Saben Lee (born 1999), basketball player for Maccabi Tel Aviv of the Israeli Basketball Premier League
- Will Lee III (born 2003) NFL football Cornerback for the Carolina Panthers
- Tod Leiweke (born 1960), sports executive and owner of the Seattle Kraken
- Maggie LePique (born 1964), jazz radio host
- Laura Les (born 1994), musician
- Stacey Levine, fiction writer, journalist
- Jenifer Lewis (born 1957), actress
- Charles Lindbergh (1902–1974), adventurer, pilot, soldier, author
- Linda Lingle (born 1953), former governor of Hawaii
- Theodore Link (1850–1923), architect
- Warren Lipka (born 1964), soccer player and coach
- Sonny Liston (1932–1970), heavyweight champion boxer
- John Long (born 1950), blues musician
- Taylor Louderman (born 1990), Broadway actress
- Carl Lutz (1895–1975), Swiss diplomat responsible for saving over 62,000 Jews during World War II
- Jack Lynn (born 2000), soccer player

== M ==
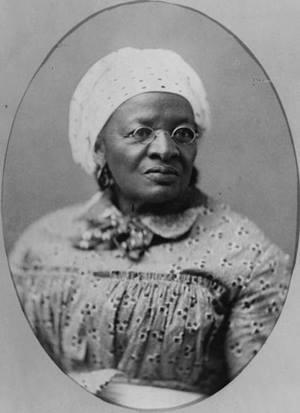
Mary Meachum, abolitionist and Underground Railroad leader

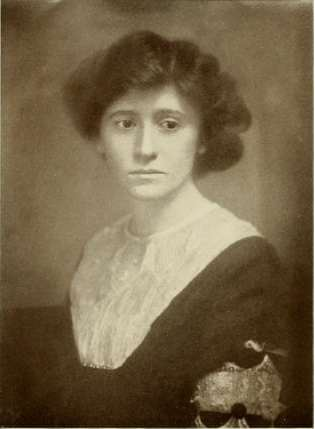
Marguerite Martyn, journalist and political cartoonist

- Vicki Mabrey (born 1956), broadcast journalist
- Ed Macauley (1928–2011), Hall of Fame basketball player
- Jeremy Maclin (born 1988), football wide receiver (Baltimore Ravens)
- Justin Marks (born 1981), former NASCAR driver, co-owner of Trackhouse Racing
- Patrick Maroon (born 1988), ice hockey player for the Tampa Bay Lightning
- James S. Marshall (1819–1892), mayor of Green Bay, Wisconsin
- Cuonzo Martin (born 1971), basketball coach for the University of Missouri
- Peter Martin (born 1970), jazz pianist
- Marguerite Martyn (1878–1948), journalist and artist
- Judith McNaught (born 1944), novelist
- Mary Meachum (1801–1869), abolitionist
- John Berry Meachum (1789–1854), founder of the oldest black church in Missouri
- Marsha Mason (born 1942), Golden Globe Award-winning and Oscar-nominated actress
- William H. Masters (1915–2001) and Virginia E. Johnson (1925–2013), members of a joint research team on human sexual response at Washington University in St. Louis
- Stan Masters (1922–2005), American realism artist
- Ron Mathis (born 1958), Major League baseball player
- Bill Mauldin (1921–2003), cartoonist, Pulitzer Prize winner
- Morton D. May (1914–1983), philanthropist, community leader, art collector, chairman of May Department Stores
- Scott Mayfield (born 1992), ice hockey player
- Virginia Mayo (1920–2005), born Virginia Clara Jones, actress
- Jimmy McCracklin (1921–2012), pianist, vocalist and songwriter
- Michael McDonald (born 1952), singer, Grammy Award winner, lead vocalist on The Doobie Brothers
- Margaret Bischell McFadden (1870–1932), philanthropist and social worker
- Robert McFerrin, Sr. (1921–2006), classical singer, father of Bobby McFerrin
- Scott A. McGregor (born 1956), technology executive and philanthropist
- Robert McHenry (born 1945), encyclopedist and author
- Jim McKelvey (born 1965), computer science engineer, co-founder of Square, a mobile payments company
- Mike McKenna (born 1983), NHL player for the Philadelphia Flyers
- Matt McKeon (born 1974), soccer player
- Chuck McKinley (1941–1986), Hall of Fame tennis player, 1963 Wimbledon champion
- Ben McLemore (born 1993), basketball player
- George McManus (1884–1954), creator of comic strip Bringing Up Father
- Larissa Meek (born 1978), Miss Missouri Teen USA 1997, Miss Missouri 2001, creative director at BGT Partners
- David Merrick (1911–2000), theatrical producer (Tony Awards)
- Henry J. Messing (1847–1913), rabbi of the United Hebrew Congregation
- Metro Boomin (born 1993), record producer, songwriter and DJ
- Stella De Mette (1891–1989), contralto opera singer
- Joyce Meyer (born 1943), religious preacher and speaker
- Bob Miller (1939–1993), MLB pitcher, StL Cardinals, graduated from Beaumont High School
- Jay Miller (1943–1991), basketball player
- Marvin Miller (1913–1985), actor
- David Miller (born 1961), darts player
- George A. Mitchell (1824–1878), founder of Cadillac, Michigan
- J. E. Mitchell (1876–1952), founder and managing editor of the St. Louis Argus
- Nannie Mitchell (1877–1975), founder and president of the St. Louis Argus
- Russ Mitchell (born 1960), journalist and television news anchor
- Steve Mizerany (died 2011), business owner and media personality
- Marie Moentmann (1900–1974), child survivor of industrial accident, wearer of prosthetic device
- Taylor Momsen (born 1993), singer-songwriter, model, actress
- Archie Moore (1916–1998), boxer, world light-heavyweight champion
- Marianne Moore (1887–1972), poet (Pulitzer Prize), essayist, translator
- Agnes Moorehead (1900–1974), Emmy Award-winning and Oscar-nominated actress
- Thomas Morse (born 1968), composer
- Dorothy Morton (1869–1939), actress and soprano
- Bill Mueller (born 1971), baseball player and coach, St Louis Cardinals
- Nick Murphy (born 1979), NFL punter 2002–2005
- Stan Musial (1920–2013), Hall of Fame baseball player for the St. Louis Cardinals

== N–O ==
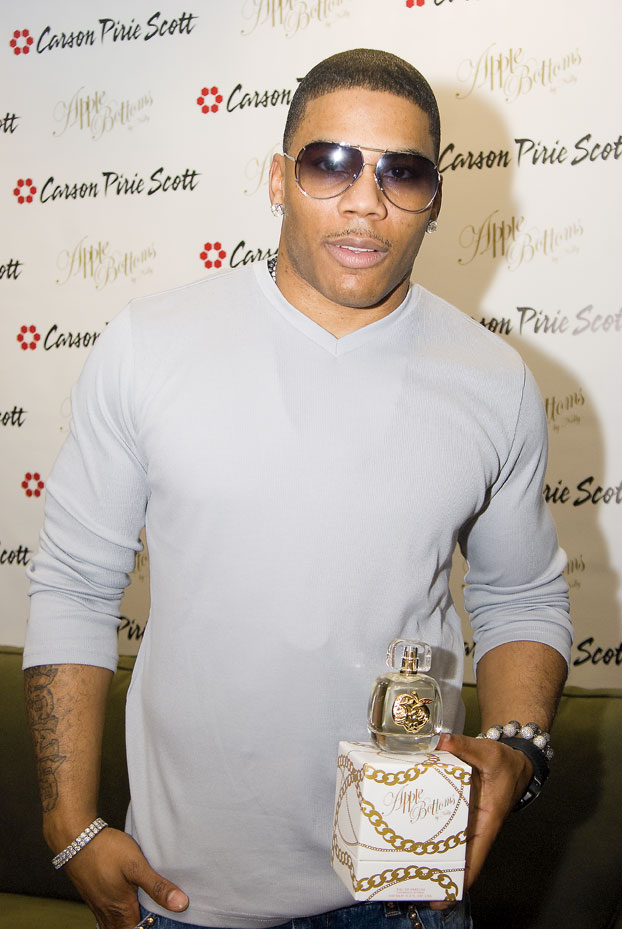
Nelly, rapper

- Nelly (born 1974), real name Cornell Haynes, Jr., rapper, singer and actor
- Oliver Nelson (1932–1975), jazz saxophonist, clarinetist, arranger, composer, and bandleader
- Howard Nemerov (1920–1991), poet (Pulitzer Prize, Poet Laureate of the United States), author, critic
- Eric Nenninger (born 1978), actor
- Eric P. Newman (1911–2017), numismatist
- Todd Newton (born 1970), game show host, radio personality
- Dustin Nguyen (born 1962), Vietnamese American actor
- Chase Niece (born 1998), soccer player, North Texas SC
- Rich Niemann (born 1946), athlete
- Frank Nuderscher (1880–1959), American Impressionist painter
- Dan O'Bannon (1946–2009), screenwriter, director
- Gyo Obata (1923–2022), architect
- Anne-Marie O'Connor (fl. 2012 – c. ??), journalist, author
- St. Louis Jimmy Oden (1903–1977), real name James Burke Oden, blues musician
- Caroline Schutz O'Fallon (1804-1898) benefactor and philanthropist
- Franklin W. Olin (1860–1951), industrialist, philanthropist
- Angel Olsen (born 1987), folk and indie rock musician
- Walter J. Ong (1912–2003), scholar
- Kyle O'Reilly (born 1987), real name Kyle Greenwood, professional wrestler
- Howard Orenstein (born 1955), Minnesota state legislator and lawyer
- *Annie L. Y. Orff (1861–1914), journalist; magazine editor and publisher
- Barry Orton (1958–2021), professional wrestler
- "Cowboy" Bob Orton (born 1950), former professional wrestler
- Randy Orton (born 1980), professional wrestler
- Josh Outman (born 1984), Major League Baseball player, Oakland Athletics

== P–Q ==
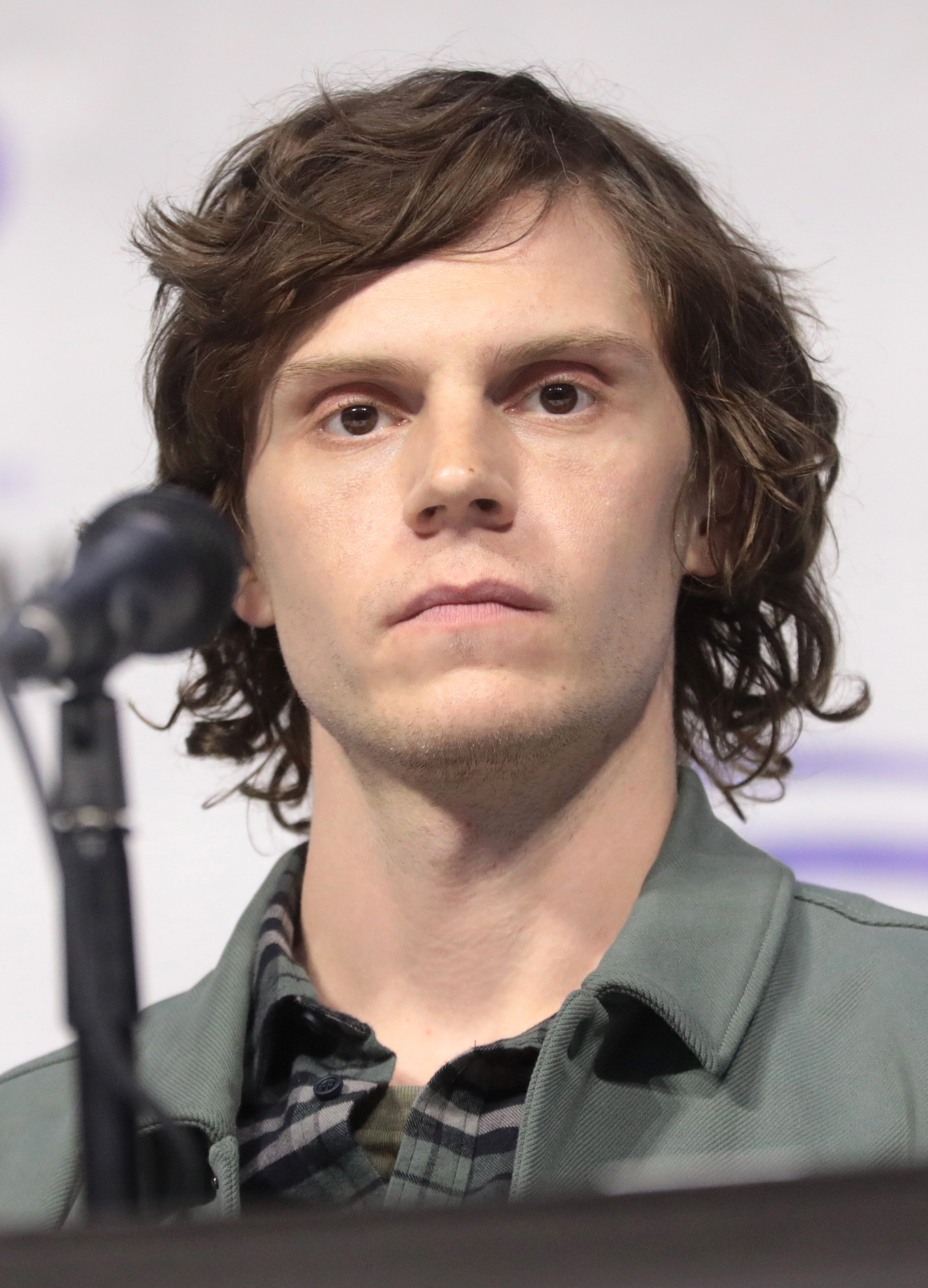
Evan Peters, actor best known for multiple roles in American Horror Story

- David Packouz (born 1982), international arms dealer and subject of 2016 film Arms and the Dudes
- Ken Page (born 1954), actor, voice actor, cabaret singer
- Lucia Pamela (1904–2002), musician, mother of Georgia Frontiere
- James Pankow (born 1947), trombone player, of Chicago
- John Pankow (born 1954), actor (Beverly Hills Cop, Mad About You)
- Leslie Parnas (1931–2022), classical cellist
- King Parsons (born 1949), professional wrestler
- Ann Peebles (born 1947), soul singer, songwriter
- D. H. Peligro (born 1959), real name born Darren Henley, drummer for Dead Kennedys and Red Hot Chili Peppers
- Frank P. Pellegrino (1901–1975), businessman, philanthropist, chief executive officer of International Hat Company
- Marlin Perkins (1905–1986), zoologist, Emmy Award-winning broadcaster
- Miguel Perez (born 2005), professional soccer player for St. Louis City SC in the MLS
- Evan Peters (born 1987), actor (American Horror Story)
- Mike Peters (born 1943), Pulitzer Prize-winning editorial cartoonist and comic strip artist, creator of Mother Goose and Grimm
- Homer G. Phillips (1880–1931), prominent lawyer and civil rights advocate, Homer G. Phillips Hospital named in his honor
- Stone Phillips (born 1954), television journalist
- Julie Piekarski (born 1963), Mouseketeer, actress
- William Popper (1874–1963), Orientalist and professor
- Bill Porter (1931–2010), audio engineer
- Otto Porter (born 1993), small forward of the Chicago Bulls
- Louise Post (born 1966), musician (Veruca Salt)
- Joseph W. Postlewaite (1827–1889), musician
- Emil Preetorius (1827–1905), journalist
- Vincent Price (1911–1993), actor (House of Wax, The Ten Commandments, The Fly, Edward Scissorhands)
- John G. Priest (1822–1900), real estate dealer, philanthropist, first St. Louis Veiled Prophet
- Victor Proetz (1897–1966), architect, designer, author of poetry and verse
- Joseph Pulitzer (1847–1911), publisher, philanthropist, creator of the Pulitzer Prize and many U.S. newspapers
- Kevin Puts (born 1972), composer, 2012 Pulitzer Prize in Music, 2023 Grammy Award for Best Contemporary Classical Composition

== R ==
- Neil Rackers (born 1976), athlete, placekicker for Arizona Cardinals
- Steve Ralston (born 1974), soccer player and coach who represented the United States national team
- Harold Ramis (1944–2014), author, director, actor; graduated from Washington University (1966)
- Judy Rankin (born 1945), professional golfer and TV commentator, World Golf Hall of Famer
- David Rasche (born 1944), actor
- Peter H. Raven (1936–2026), botanist, academic administrator, civic leader
- Hank Raymonds (1924–2010), coached Marquette University men's basketball 1977–83; athletic director 1977–87
- Tim Ream (born 1987), soccer player who represented and captained the United States national team
- Vincent Reed, former assistant secretary of education under President Ronald Reagan
- Wallace Reid (1891–1923), actor, early cinema sex symbol
- Steven Reigns (born 1975), poet, activist, educator
- Hadley Richardson (1891–1979), first wife of Ernest Hemingway
- Branch Rickey (1881–1965), baseball executive
- Rob Riti (born 1976), football player
- Doris Roberts (1925–2016), actress (Everybody Loves Raymond)
- Leonard Roberts (born 1972), actor
- Lance Robertson (born 1965), musician and host of children's television show Yo Gabba Gabba! (as DJ Lance Rock)
- Harry Rogers (born 1950), professional basketball player
- Mike Rodgers (born 1985), track and field sprinter
- Irma S. Rombauer (1877–1962), author
- Jean Rouverol (1916–2017), author, actress and screenwriter; blacklisted in the 1950s
- Jack Rowe (1856–1911), major league baseball player
- Caroline Thomas Rumbold (1877–1949), botanist
- David Ruprecht (born 1948), television stage actor and game show host
- Charles M. Russell (1864–1926), artist, storyteller

== S ==
- Claire Saffitz (born 1986), chef and personality on Bon Appétit magazine's YouTube channel
- John S. Samuel (1913–2002), U.S. Air Force major general
- David Sanborn (1945–2024), musician, Grammy Award winner
- Drew Sarich (born 1975), singer, songwriter, actor
- Becky Sauerbrunn (born 1985), soccer player
- Edward Saxon (born 1956), film producer (The Silence of the Lambs)
- Max Scherzer (born 1984), MLB pitcher
- Phyllis Schlafly (1924–2016), socially conservative Republican author, broadcaster, and political organizer
- Zander Schloss (born 1961), bassist for the Circle Jerks and The Weirdos; actor
- Red Schoendienst (1923–2018), Hall of Fame second baseman, coach, manager for St. Louis Cardinals
- Chris Schuler (born 1987), professional soccer player for Real Salt Lake
- Dred Scott (1799–1858) and Harriet Scott (1815–1860), civil rights activists
- Mark Segbers (born 1996), soccer player
- Robert J. Sexton (fl. 1997 – c. ??), music video and virtual reality director, and former musician
- Sexyy Red (born 1998), rapper, singer, songwriter, Gamma record label
- Art Shamsky (born 1941), Major League Baseball outfielder and Israel Baseball League manager
- Mike Shannon (1939–2023), affiliated with St. Louis Cardinals for over 50 years, as a player (1962–1970), in front office, and, since 1972, radio and TV announcer
- Scott Shannon (born 1947), DJ hosting WCBS-FM in New York City
- Augustus Shapleigh (1810–1902), president of Shapleigh Hardware Company and early pioneer of St. Louis
- Henry Shaw (1800–1889), botanist, philanthropist, businessman, author
- Rick Shaw (1938–2017), disc jockey, radio and television personality (WQAM, WAXY, WMXJ, WLBW), born in East St. Louis
- William Tecumseh Sherman (1820–1891), soldier; commander of United States Army
- Roberta Sherwood (1913–1999), singer and actress
- Sherman Silber (fl. 1966 – c. ??), physician and infertility specialist
- Frank Simek (born 1984), soccer player with Sheffield Wednesday, also USA International
- Kimora Lee Simmons (born 1975), model and mogul
- Leonard Slatkin (born 1944), conductor, Grammy Award winner
- Slayyyter (born 1996), pop musician
- Jane Smiley (born 1949), Pulitzer Prize-winning novelist
- Smino (born 1991), real name Christopher Smith Jr, rapper, singer, songwriter, Zero Fatigue record label
- Jason Smith (born 1980), U.S. representative for Missouri
- Nikko Smith (born 1982), singer, American Idol contestant; son of Ozzie Smith
- Ozzie Smith (born 1954), Hall of Fame shortstop for St. Louis Cardinals
- Phyllis Smith (born 1952), actress on NBC's The Office and Disney's movie Inside Out
- Willie Mae Ford Smith (1904–1994), singer
- Xavier Sneed (born 1997), basketball player in the Israeli Basketball Premier League
- Cory Spinks (born 1978), world champion boxer
- Leon Spinks (1953–2021), world champion boxer
- Michael Spinks (born 1956), world champion boxer
- Max C. Starkloff (1858–1942), St. Louis Health Commissioner who introduced social distancing during the 1918 flu pandemic
- Paul Stastny (born 1985), hockey player for St. Louis Blues
- Yan Stastny (born 1982), hockey player for St. Louis Blues
- Harry Steinfeldt (1877–1914), Major League Baseball player
- Edward Steinhardt (born 1961), poet and author
- Winford Stokes (1951–1990), serial killer executed by lethal injection
- Chuck Stone (1924–2014), journalist, educator and civil rights activist
- Stevie Stone (born 1981), rapper, born in Columbia, raised in St. Louis, signed to Kansas City-based Strange Music
- Willie Sudhoff (1874–1917), Major League Baseball player
- Sug Sutton (born 1998), WNBA guard for the Washington Mystics
- Roosevelt Sykes (1906–1983), blues musician
- James W. Symington (born 1927), U.S. representative, statesman, attorney
- SZA (born 1989), real name Solana Rowe, singer-songwriter, TDE (Top Dawg Entertainment) record label

== T ==
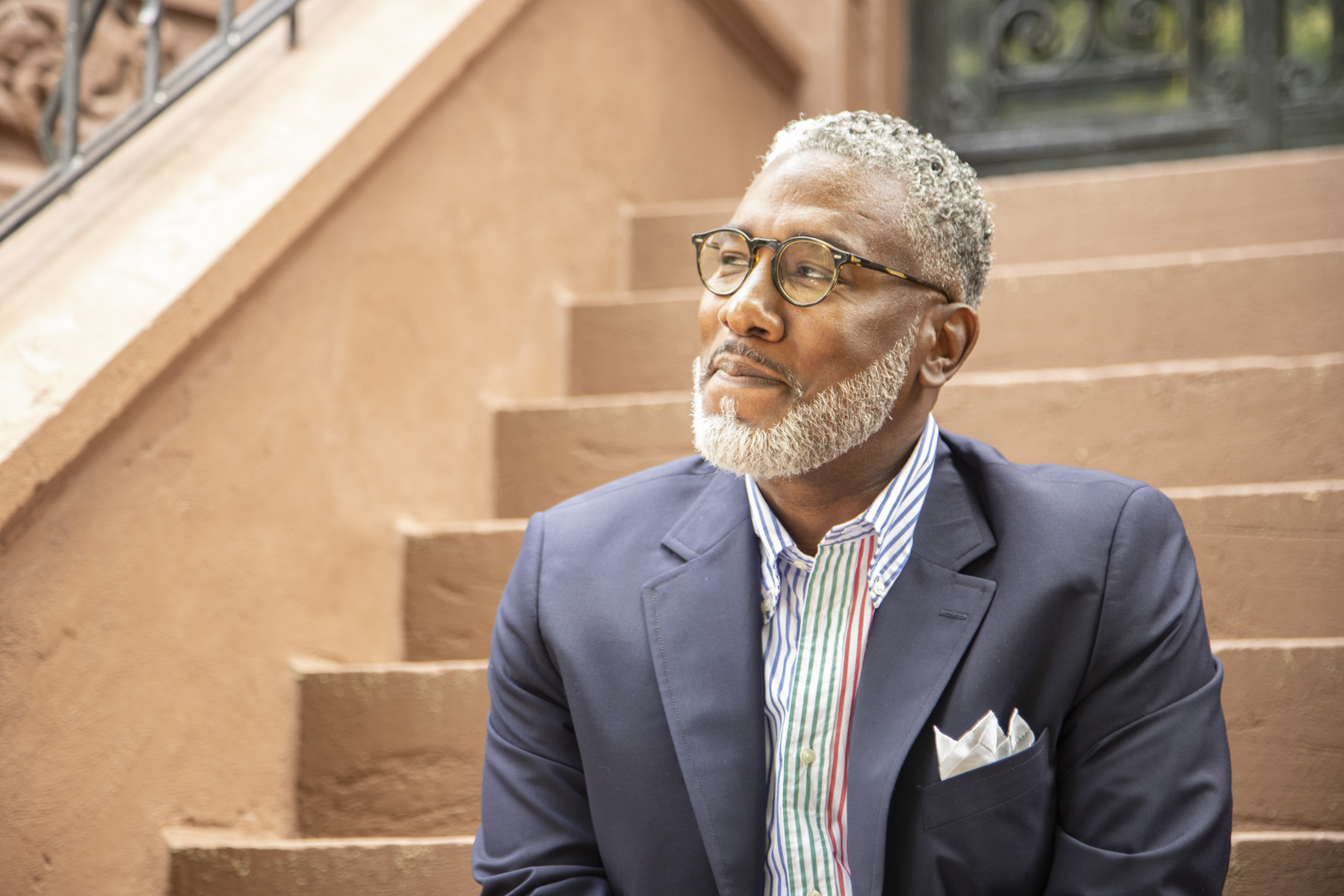
Conrad Tillard

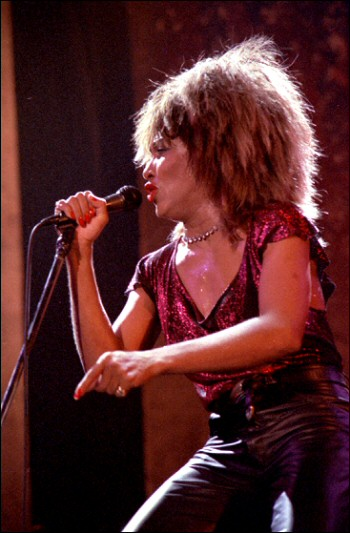
Tina Turner, widely referred to as "Queen of Rock 'n' Roll"

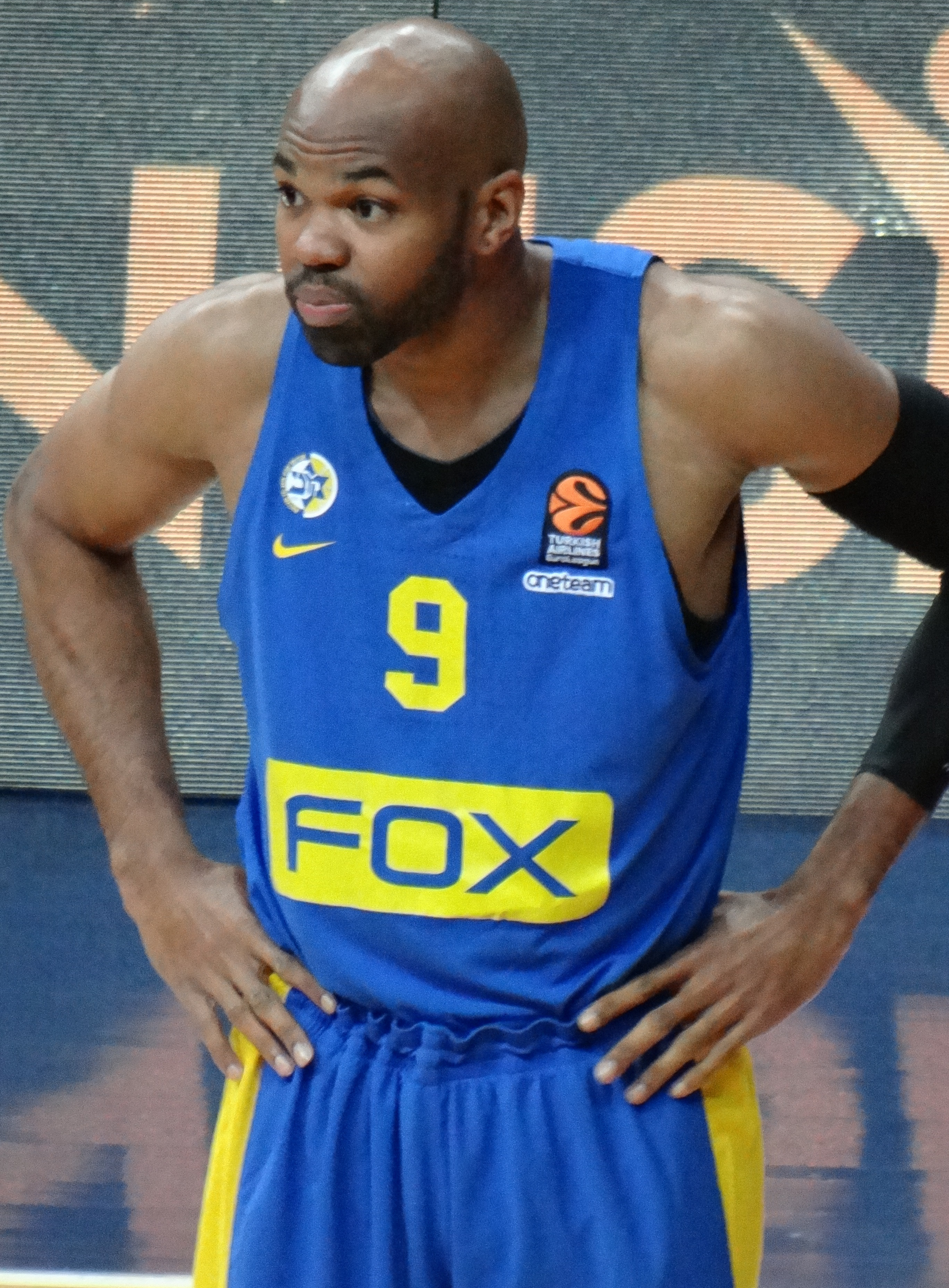
Alex Tyus, professional basketball player

- Margaret Taber (1935–2015), electrical engineer
- Jim Talent (born 1956), politician
- Jayson Tatum (born 1998), forward for the Boston Celtics of the National Basketball Association
- Sara Teasdale (1884–1933), poet (Pulitzer Prize)
- Clark Terry (1920–2015), jazz musician
- Brooke Tessmacher, real name Brooke Adams (born 1984), professional wrestler
- George Thampy (born 1987), 2000 Scripps National Spelling Bee champion
- Lou Thesz (1916–2002), professional wrestler
- David Thirdkill (born 1960), NBA basketball player; 1993 Israeli Basketball Premier League MVP
- Todd Thomas (born 1961), fashion designer
- Kay Thompson (1909–1998), singer, songwriter, author of Eloise books
- Paul Tietjens (1877-1943), pianist, composer, composer of score for 1902 Wizard of Oz comic opera
- John L. Tiernon (1841–1910), U.S. Army brigadier general
- Conrad Tillard (born 1964), politician, Baptist minister, radio host, author, and activist
- Cap Tilles (1865–1951), race track magnate, philanthropist, founder of Tilles Park
- Gina Tognoni (born 1973), actress
- Guy Torry (born 1969), actor and comedian
- Joe Torry (born 1965), actor and comedian
- Scott Touzinsky (born 1982), volleyball player and coach
- Henry Townsend (1909–2006), musician
- Toya (born 1983), real name LaToya Rodriguez, R&B singer
- Maury Travis (1965–2002), murderer and suspected serial killer
- Helen Traubel (1899–1972), classical and popular singer
- Ryan Trey (born 1999), singer and rapper
- Julie Tristan (fl. 2012 – c. ??), television personality
- Quincy Troupe (born 1939), poet, editor, journalist
- Ernest Trova (1927–2009), artist
- Ross H. Trower (1922–2014), chief of chaplains, U.S. Navy
- Harry S. Truman (1884–1972), 33rd U.S. president
- Truth Hurts (born 1971), real name Shari Watson, R&B singer
- Orrin Tucker (1911–2011), bandleader
- Debbye Turner (born 1965), Miss America 1990, TV journalist
- Ike Turner (1931–2007), singer, musician, agent and production administrator
- Jessie Franklin Turner (1881–1956), fashion designer
- Tina Turner (1939–2023), real name Anna Mae Bullock, Grammy Award-winning singer, actress, pop-culture icon
- Taylor Twellman (born 1980), professional soccer player
- Alex Tyus (born 1988), American-Israeli professional basketball player, also plays for Israeli national basketball team

== U–V ==
- David King Udall (1851–1938), politician
- Mark Valenti (born 1958), screenwriter and novelist
- Courtney Van Buren (born 1980), National Football League player
- Mona Van Duyn (1921–2004), poet (Pulitzer Prize, Poet Laureate of the United States), editor
- George Van Haltren (1866–1945), Major League Baseball player
- Maria Rosa Villalpando (1738-1830), Hispanic woman, former captive of the Comanche and Pawnee
- Marilyn vos Savant (born 1946), columnist, known for having the world's highest IQ

== W ==
- Ann Wagner (born 1962), U.S. representative for Missouri
- Jack Wagner (born 1959), actor
- Caroline Holme Walker (1863–1955), composer
- Rosa Kershaw Walker (1840s–1909), author, journalist, editor
- Frank Wallace (1922–1979), soccer player who represented the United States national team
- Kenny Wallace (born 1963), NASCAR driver
- Mike Wallace (born 1959), NASCAR driver
- Rusty Wallace (born 1956), NASCAR champion driver
- Steve Wallace (born 1987), NASCAR driver
- Trey Waltke (born 1955), tennis player, won ATP title in 1980
- Maxine Waters (born 1938), U.S. representative for California
- Leroy H. Watson (1893–1975), U.S. Army major general
- Earl Weaver (1930–2013), Hall of Fame baseball manager
- Dick Weber (1929–2005), professional bowler
- Pete Weber (born 1979), professional bowler
- Harry Weber (born 1942), sculptor
- William H. Webster (1924–2025), director of the FBI and CIA, Chairman of the Homeland Security Advisory Council
- Dave Weckl (born 1960), musician, drummer
- Annie Wersching (1977–2023), actress, played Renee Walker on TV series 24
- Peter Westbrook (1952–2024), Olympic bronze medalist saber fencer (1984), 13x national champion
- Jo Jo White (1946–2018), basketball player
- Joseph T. White (1961–1985), United States Army soldier who defected to North Korea on August 28, 1982
- Verner Moore White (1863–1923), artist
- Marissa Whitley (born 1983), Miss Teen USA 2001
- Mary Wickes (1910–1995), actress
- Chris Wideman (born 1990), NHL player
- Bill Wilkerson (1945–2017), sports announcer and radio personality (KMOX)
- Violet Wilkey (1903–1976), actress
- Jameson Williams (born 2001), NFL player
- Melvin Williams (born 1979), NFL player
- Tennessee Williams (1911–1983), real name Thomas Lanier, Pulitzer Prize-winning playwright
- Mykelti Williamson (born 1957), actor, played Bubba Blue in Forrest Gump
- Ike Willis (born c. 1957), musician
- Francille Rusan Wilson (born 1947), historian and academic
- Rodney Wilson (born 1965), St. Louis educator and founder of LGBTQ+ History Month
- Angela Winbush (born 1955), R&B/soul singer, songwriter
- Devon Windsor (born 1994), model
- Trey Wingo (born 1955), sports journalist (KSDK-TV, ESPN)
- Kellen Winslow (born 1957), NFL football player, Hall of Famer
- Shelley Winters (1920–2006), Academy Award-winning actress
- Edwin E. Woodman (1838–1912), Wisconsin state senator
- Harriett Woods (1927–2007), politician; two-time Democratic nominee for the U.S. Senate from Missouri; former lieutenant governor
- Dan Wool (fl. 1986 – c. ??), musician, composer with group Pray for Rain

== X–Z ==
- Clyde X (1931–2009), leader in the Nation of Islam
- Tiffany Zaloudek, military officer
