= Standing Pelican: Key West Poems & Stories =

Book of poetry

First edition

Standing Pelican: Key West Poems & Stories is a 2009 book by American author Edward Steinhardt.

In Standing Pelican: Key West Poems & Stories, Steinhardt continued his poetic offerings, but added in this collection short fiction as well. John Hemingway, who wrote a Foreword to the book, said the stories “let you feel what the character experiences but with an economy of words and description that only true poets and artists are capable of.” The book, which was purposely Key West-themed, was (according to Hemingway) “a subtropical alfresco with all the heat and ambiguity that had originally attracted my grandfather to the island in the 1920s.” The book is not unlike John Hersey's book Key West Tales, an earlier Key West-themed book.

== Reviews ==
Charles Guenther, writing a review of the book, said Steinhardt “excels in the short story.” He said “Many if not most writers have more than one voice—lyric, dramatic or narrative. Few have succeeded in all three, but it's always a joy to find such an emerging talent.” The opening section of Standing Pelican contains a dozen poems, all with present-day Key West settings, and all strikingly different. Guenther said “ The lines are spare, cinematic, on themes of a Tarot reader, urban bars, and Key West settings. Emotion is tempered, unlike that of modernist Wallace Stevens in whose "Farewell to Florida" (a century ago) "Key West sank downward under massive clouds," and who "hates the weathery yawl" and "the vivid blooms" of that city.

“Contrasted is Wallace Stevens' "The Idea of Order at Key West" which begins with a singing woman (the Sea) and ends almost romantically by summoning a fisherman (Ramon Hernandez). Steinhardt's "On the Pier at Key West" sings a real man and woman who "Methodically cast/Their blind lines into the sea."

J. Peter Bergman, in his November, 2010 review of the book, said there is a “condition of universality that pervades the poems that open this book.” He cites the poems “The Tarot Reader,” “The Marriage” and “The Algebra of Love” as examples. The poem "Going and Coming Back," which closes the poetry section, “in its own tightly written and beautifully expressed way gives us the poet and his choices in life. Like "Johnny Bible" this poem brings us closest to the heart of the man who writes the words.”

In fiction, Steinhardt employs surprising transitions in the narrative, as in “The Trials of January Jones,” or “The Thing You Least Expect,” which are decidedly about the failure of communication in human relationships. “A Square Green Patch of Earth,” about an elderly couple and their relationship, employs symbolism (a white and then dark ibis) and the resulting loss of a loved one and grief.

J. Peter Bergman said Steinhardt's stories are sometimes merely character sketches with no narrative purpose, such as "A Square Green Patch of Earth," or lengthy adventures leading to no ending like "The Thing You Least Expect." Others create vivid pictures of people and place, all of the places being sites in Key West. Best among them is "Johnny Bible,” which Bergman said “is a brilliant effort by a writer to show how obsession begets regret, how solitariness becomes loneliness and how the spirit can be lifted and dropped in an instant.”

== Related works ==
Steinhardt also dabbled in playwriting with the derivative one-act play “A Summer Place,” a patently biographical play (or docu-drama) about Tennessee Williams and a (fictitious) last-minute interview, and his habit of going from town to town with a young companion.

The play, according to Bergman, “is flawed by its own brilliant construction and the necessity for outside influences from the street below. These interruptions are as much visual as they are vocal and the script’s technique is more cinematic than stageworthy.”
