= Todd Thomas =

Todd Thomas may refer to:

- Speech (rapper) (Todd Thomas, born 1968), American rapper and musician
- Todd Thomas (American football) (1959–2000), gridiron football player
- Todd Thomas (designer) (born 1961), fashion designer
- Todd Alan Reed (né Thomas; born 1967), American serial killer
