= Pat Baker =

Pat Baker may refer to:

- Pat Baker (soccer) (born 1962), American soccer goalkeeper
- Pat Baker (lacrosse) (1939–2022), Canadian box lacrosse goaltender
