= Augustus Shapleigh =

American businessman

Augustus Frederick Shapleigh
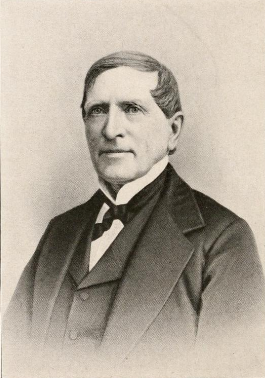
- Born: January 9, 1810; Portsmouth, New Hampshire, United States
- Died: February 27, 1902 (aged 92); St. Louis, Missouri, US
- Occupation: Businessman
- Years active: 1843–1901
- Known for: President of the A. F. Shapleigh Hardware Company

Augustus Frederick Shapleigh (1810–1902) was an American businessman and early pioneer of St. Louis during the Second Industrial Revolution. He was president of the A. F. Shapleigh Hardware Company, which by the 1880s grew to be one of the largest wholesale hardware firms west of the Mississippi River. He was also involved in a number of other business endeavors in the banking, mining, and insurance industry.

== Early life ==
Shapleigh was the son of Captain Richard Waldron Shapleigh and Dorothea Blaisdell Shapleigh. His father was captain of the Granville. In 1813, at the age of 37, Captain Richard Shapleigh died at sea with his ship, which was wrecked off Rye Beach, New York.

== Career ==
In 1843, Shapleigh founded one of the first hardware stores in St. Louis on behalf of Rogers, Field & Company. The following year the company was renamed Rogers, Shapleigh & Company. The original store was a four-story building at 412-422 Main Street. The site was chosen for its proximity to the Mississippi River, which was the main source of transportation for goods at the time.

Aside from his connection with the hardware industry, Shapleigh was associated with various other business concerns all of which constitute elements in the development of St. Louis. In 1859, he became identified with the State Bank of St. Louis and in 1862 was elected a director of the Merchant's National Bank, so continuing until 1890, when he resigned in favor of his son Alfred. He was also president of the Phoenix Insurance Company, vice president of the Covenant Mutual Life Insurance Company.

He was also invested in the Hope Mining Company and the Granite Mountain Mining Company. Shapleigh also served as a board director of the Hope Mining Company.

== Death ==
Shapleigh died of natural causes at the age of 92. He had been in failing health for many years, but retained his mental faculties. He is buried in Bellefontaine Cemetery in St. Louis.

== See also ==
- Second Industrial Revolution
- List of people from St. Louis
