= Robert A. Holekamp =

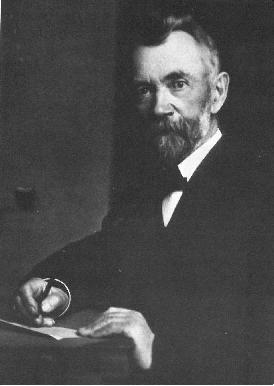
- Robert Holekamp in 1905
- Born: May 4, 1848; Nordstemmen, Germany
- Died: May 1, 1922 (aged 73); Webster Groves, Missouri, United States
- Occupations: Entrepreneur, urban apiarist

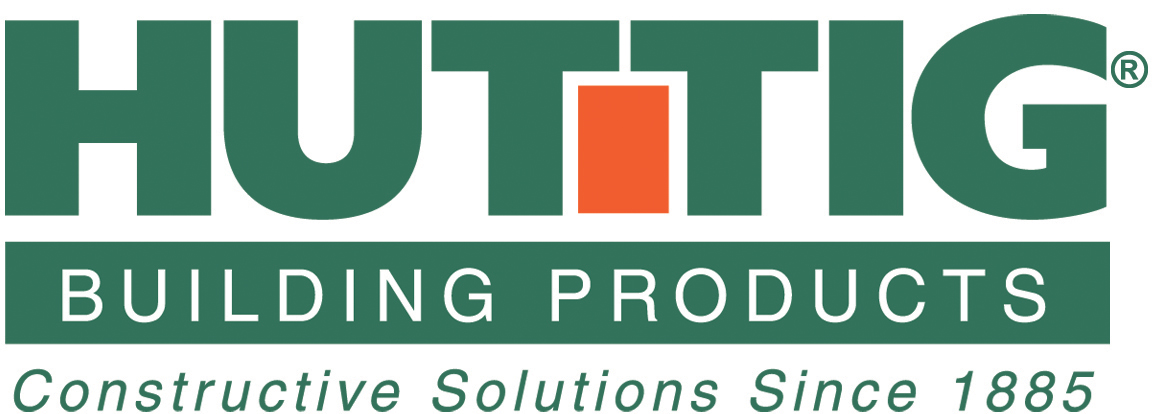
The Huttig logo commemorates the 1885 purchase of Gray & Holekamp

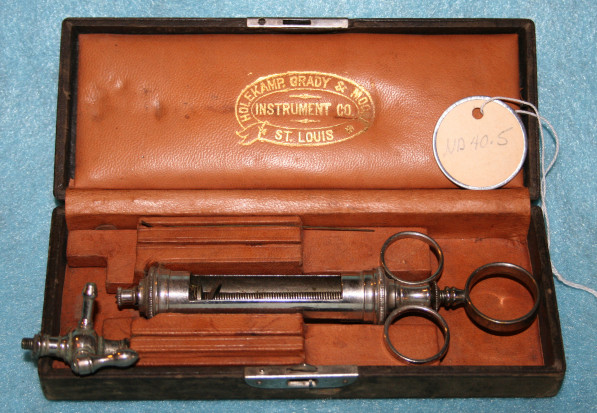
Holekamp, Grady & Moore syringe in the University of Arkansas collection

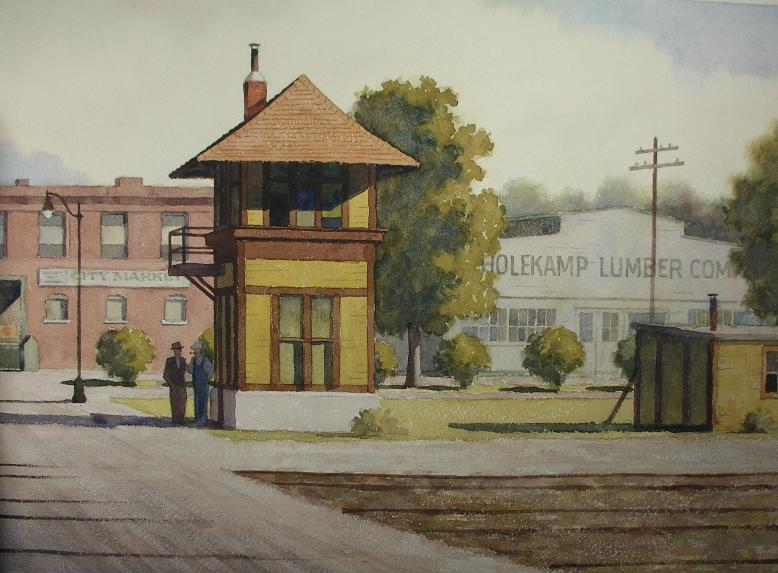
Stan Masters painting, Holekamp Lumber, depicts the 1920 Kirkwood yard now designated an historic landmark by the Kirkwood Landmarks Commission

Robert August Holekamp (May 4, 1848 – May 1, 1922) was a businessman and apiarist from the St. Louis suburb of Webster Groves, Missouri. Holekamp was significant in the development of Webster Groves, and had state and national influence in the field of beekeeping.

== Childhood in Germany ==
Holekamp was born the son of a Lutheran minister in Nordstemmen, Kingdom of Hanover. At the age of 14, he went to Hildesheim to attend college. In 1868 he joined the Prussian army and served for two years, leaving as a non-commissioned officer. In 1870, he came to the United States and settled in St. Louis.

== Business endeavors ==
Upon arriving in St. Louis, Holekamp worked for various employers before becoming the manager at a door and sash dealer. In 1879, Holekamp and James Gray organized the firm Gray & Holekamp, a wholesale manufacturer and distributor of sashes and doors, and grew the company into the largest dealer in St. Louis. In early 1885, Holekamp bought Gray's ownership interest and in December of that year he sold the company to Charles H. Huttig for $40,000. Gray & Holekamp is known today as Huttig Building Products, is one of the largest distributor of building products in the United States, and is traded publicly on the NASDAQ Exchange (HBP).

As a result of the coal pollution in St. Louis and following his doctor's advice, in 1896 Holekamp moved to a farm located three miles outside of Annapolis in Iron County, Missouri. He later purchased and operated a saw mill in that area.

In 1901, Holekamp returned to St. Louis where he had previously purchased a surgical instrument company which he later named Holekamp, Grady & Moore. He sold the company after operating it for 7 years.

In 1908, Holekamp co-founded the Holekamp Lumber Company in Webster Groves with his four sons. Holekamp moved to Webster Groves and served as the firm's president. In addition to the wholesale and retail sale of lumber and hardware, the firm was active in real estate development. Holekamp and his sons established many of the subdivisions and built many of the homes in Webster Groves, in neighboring Kirkwood, and in the surrounding southwestern suburbs of St. Louis. By the time of Holekamp's death, Holekamp Lumber operated six lumberyards (St. Louis, Maplewood, Affton, Webster Groves, Kirkwood, and Gray Summit), and the company would remain in business until the mid-1980s.

== Leading apiarist ==
While living in rural Annapolis, Missouri, Holekamp developed an interest in apiology and began beekeeping. He continued the hobby upon his return to St. Louis, and Holekamp became among the first to engage in urban apiculture in the United States.

Concerned about the spread of foulbrood disease among bees in Missouri, Holekamp proposed a bill and successfully lobbied both houses of the Missouri State Legislature to pass a law to address the epidemic. When the measure was unexpectedly vetoed by Governor Joseph W. Folk in 1908, Holekamp personally appealed to the Governor and convinced him to change his mind. Holekamp's bill created the state office of bee inspector, making Missouri among the first states to regulate the commercial beekeeping industry. Holekamp actively advised the new bureau, and continued to regularly testify for the state on matters of apiculture.

Holekamp was a judge at the Missouri State Fair for several years, was the superintendent of the bee exhibit at the 1920 Oklahoma State Fair, was the apiary superintendent for the University of Missouri, served as a member of the Executive Board of the Honey Producers' League, and served for several years on the board of directors for the National Beekeepers’ Association of the United States and Canada.

Holekamp died in 1922 after a brief illness and heart trouble. The banks in Maplewood and Webster Groves were closed on the day of his funeral in observance of his passing.
