= Edward Steinhardt =

American poet

Edward Steinhardt (born August 16, 1961) is an American poet, journalist, editor and fiction author.

== Early years ==
Edward Steinhardt was born in Wayne, Michigan, to Lee and Ethel (née Comstock) Steinhardt. At the time of his birth, his father was on active duty in the U.S. Navy. The child was born premature, and named Edward in honor of his mother's father. The marriage, however, did not last. Lee remarried in 1966, marrying Mary Campbell, a union which produced four more children.

Lee Steinhardt, an itinerant carpenter and cabinet-maker, moved the family frequently. Except for a dairy farm in Minnesota, the elder Steinhardt made his living exclusively as a contractor, residing at last in Missouri, where the teenage Edward attended high school and graduated in 1980.

== Early influences and background ==
As a child, Steinhardt showed an interest in writing, an interest which his father reinforced by frequently purchasing books for him. By the time Edward was in high school, he demonstrated an ability to write both poetry and fiction.

High school English teacher Erwin Neighbors nurtured Steinhardt's writing, inviting him to join the high school creative writing club. Neighbors also took club members to a poetry reading by Howard Nemerov. Nemerov substantially influenced Steinhardt's later work.

After graduation, Steinhardt worked at a number of occupations, including bookkeeper, 35mm film projectionist, house-painter, journalist and town librarian.

His first book of poetry was published in the late 1980s. By the 1990s he served as president of the Missouri Writers' Guild. For many years, he also produced the inaugural ceremonies for Missouri Writers Week, which included readings in the village of Hermann, Missouri by U.S. Poets Laureate Howard Nemerov, Richard Wilbur and Mona Van Duyn. The second of two readings Steinhardt produced with Howard Nemerov proved to be Nemerov's final poetry reading, before his death in 1991.

Steinhardt is the author of six books, four of which are exclusively verse. His second book, Dandelion Dreams and Other Poems, was a sponsored entrant for the 1999 Pulitzer Prize for Poetry.

He is of the Imagist or Narrative school of poetry rejecting, for the most part, the Formalist approach to writing poetry. His poems rarely rhyme, but he does employ acute description, resonance, occasional internal rhyme, and imagery, which is purposely employed to evoke acute or certain feelings and “images.” It is with this work that he has excelled, while also becoming versatile with short fiction. He has also edited several books.

== His work ==
Steinhardt's work in poetry is markedly Imagist (or Narrative) and free verse in form. Richard Wilbur employed the word "exploratory," in part, to describe Steinhardt's poetry. Rarely does Steinhardt use traditional forms.

His first book, The Painting Birds, published in 1988, showed marked promise. One can see Steinhardt's progress in perfecting his Imagist form, when compared to his later work. Charles Guenther, literary book review editor for the St. Louis Post-Dispatch, said “Steinhardt already displayed the broad vision of experienced poets and artists.” He said the poems in The Painting Birds were “acutely observant commentaries unbridled by time, topic or geography.” Many of the poems, including “Oliver Twist” and “Anne Frank, 1988” are social commentaries, or about nature as in “The Wooded Brook.” He takes a droll look at everyday activities as in “Taking Out the Trash” and “Miss Universe.” Rarely is the work autobiographical, although Steinhardt does give credit to Nemerov for his influence, as in the moving tribute “Letter to H.N.” (May you be blessed, friend/With a muse of inspiration/Always at your back,/Until that squadron/Of comrades gone before/Drones by and takes you/Past the mortal corridor.) The diversity of subject matter compelled the book's editor and publisher, Bill Nunn, to write “In poetry, seldom comes along a book for everyone,” and that the book was “a delightful nominee for the appellation.”

At the time of the release of The Painting Birds, Steinhardt had already embarked on a newspaper journalism career, chiefly human-interest features, as well as extensively researched historical articles. He also wrote two weekly columns, one of which dealt with national and international issues. “The Tragedy of Bosnia-Hercegovina,” “Merry Christmas, Sarajevo” and “The Ghosts of Auschwitz” demonstrated Steinhardt's sensitivity toward the oppressed.

In the mid-1990s, Steinhardt wrote the biographical remarks (liner-notes) that appeared in the B.J. Thomas recording package, B.J. Thomas: Back/Forward, a compilation of the five-time Grammy-winner's greatest hits. Steinhardt was also slated to write a biography of Thomas, which was never completed due to a contractual dispute with the singer.

The poet's next work, Dandelion Dreams and Other Poems, published in 1999, proved to be a critical success. The book also included photography by Jeremy Nemerov, son of the U.S. Poet Laureate.

Charles Guenther, writing an introduction to the book, said the new book “brings us (as Lowell described) both the promise and permanence of the poet's voice.” Guenther said the new collection was “replete with honest and authentic American life in the finest traditions of such greatly neglected poets such as Edgar Lee Masters, E.A. Robinson (Edwin Arlington Robinson), Maxwell Bodenheim and others early in our century.”

The new book, with few exceptions, employed no formal forms. Steinhardt's work was firmly Imagist, free-verse, and rarely employing rhyme. Guenther noted that the material was “revealing” but not confessional, saying “life experiences enter his lines, often subtly, for a larger purpose.”

The poems run the gamut of work and play (“Mowing,” “Two Boys in a Field,”) haunting narratives (“Gone-away Lake,” “Night-Demons)” and love and nature poems. The book was divided into four sections thematically, namely, “Relation,” “Nature, “Spirit” and “Solo.”

Richard Wilbur said the work “moves in a characteristic, exploratory way, through scenes large or small, through memories, through relationships.” He said “They are highly readable—talkative, sympathetic, humane—and it is a pleasure to follow their courses.”

Similarly, Robert Creeley was effusive in praise for the collection, saying, “These poems are fact of an enduring human attention to what values and feelings are still possible in our world. They are pledge and record, testament and persuasive story, of a real life in a real time and place.” He said Steinhardt “has learned his art with great determination and humility. His generous authority is clear in every page.”

The work in the latter portion of the book is contemplative and largely psycho-analytical. In a complete break with any tradition is his poem, a playful commentary on the writing process:

Writer's Block

Qwertyuiop[

asdfghjkl;

zxcvbnm,./

`1234567890-=

~!@#$%^&*()_+

ZXCVBNM<>?

Other poems, such as “Shadowlands,” are a marked attempt to explore the human psyche. The end of the poem explains the pains in self-investigation or psycho-analysis, We press our nose/To the glass of our soul/And think that whatever should come,/Tempest or not,/We will see our own/Shadow cast upon the wall./We will remember that/We are our company in our aloneness,/That our image is that/Of belief battling unbelief,/Both in ourselves/And when we are in the shadowlands.

This poem was the keystone of an art exhibit in Nashville in 2007.

A thread of spirituality runs through many of Steinhardt's poems, as in the poem of apology “P,” very reminiscent of Nemerov's style and frequent droll look at the world:

We're never really fully born

Until we die—and the difference

Between breath and exit

Is the Manufacturer's guarantee

That we are now, after Milton's Paradise,

Less-bent for evil and more divine.

The best insurance for that, simply,

Is a tattle-tale heart.

Some of the poems are epigrammatic and tongue-in-cheek:

"The Difference Between Living and Dying"

The high-tension wire drawn across the soul:

Promises of heaven, prospects of below.

In December 2003, Steinhardt relocated to Key West from St. Louis. There he began to write extensively on the Key West experience. The poem “Algebra of Love” about graffiti and conversation on a Key West pier, was published in 2006 in Secret of Salt: An Indigenous Journal, followed the next year by a return to journalism with the expansive features on Tennessee Williams and Richard Wilbur in the same publication.

Steinhardt's third book, Standing Pelican: Key West Poems & Stories, was published in 2009. He continued his poetic offerings, but added in this collection short fiction as well. John Hemingway, who wrote a foreword to the book, said the stories “let you feel what the character experiences but with an economy of words and description that only true poets and artists are capable of.” The book, which was purposely Key West-themed, was (according to Hemingway) “a subtropical alfresco with all the heat and ambiguity that had originally attracted my grandfather to the island in the 1920s.” The book is not unlike John Hersey's book Key West Tales, an earlier Key West-themed book.

Charles Guenther, writing a review of the book, said Steinhardt “excels in the short story.” He said “Many if not most writers have more than one voice—lyric, dramatic or narrative. Few have succeeded in all three, but it's always a joy to find such an emerging talent.”

The opening section of Standing Pelican contains a dozen poems, all with present-day Key West settings, and all strikingly different. Guenther said “ The lines are spare, cinematic, on themes of a Tarot reader, urban bars, and Key West settings. Emotion is tempered, unlike that of modernist Wallace Stevens in whose "Farewell to Florida" (a century ago) "Key West sank downward under massive clouds," and who "hates the weathery yawl" and "the vivid blooms" of that city.

“Contrasted is Wallace Stevens' "The Idea of Order at Key West" which begins with a singing woman (the Sea) and ends almost romantically by summoning a fisherman (Ramón Hernández). Steinhardt's "On the Pier at Key West" sings a real man and woman who "Methodically cast/Their blind lines into the sea."

In fiction, Steinhardt employs surprising transitions in the narrative, as in “The Trials of January Jones,” or “The Thing You Least Expect,” which are decidedly about the failure of communication in human relationships. “A Square Green Patch of Earth,” about an elderly couple and their relationship, employs symbolism (a white and then dark ibis) and the resulting loss of a loved one and grief.

J. Peter Bergman, in his November 2010 review of the book in "Edge," said there is a “condition of universality that pervades the poems that open this book.” He cites the poems “The Tarot Reader,” “The Marriage” and “The Algebra of Love” as examples. The poem "Going and Coming Back," which closes the poetry section, “in its own tightly written and beautifully expressed way gives us the poet and his choices in life. Like "Johnny Bible" this poem brings us closest to the heart of the man who writes the words.”

In fiction, Steinhardt employs surprising transitions in the narrative, as in “The Trials of January Jones,” or “The Thing You Least Expect,” which are decidedly about the failure of communication in human relationships. “A Square Green Patch of Earth,” about an elderly couple and their relationship, employs symbolism (a white and then dark ibis) and the resulting loss of a loved one and grief.

J. Peter Bergman said Steinhardt's stories are sometimes merely character sketches with no narrative purpose, such as "A Square Green Patch of Earth," or lengthy adventures leading to no ending like "The Thing You Least Expect." Others create vivid pictures of people and place, all of the places being sites in Key West. Best among them is "Johnny Bible,” which Bergman said “is a brilliant effort by a writer to show how obsession begets regret, how solitariness becomes loneliness and how the spirit can be lifted and dropped in an instant.”

Steinhardt also dabbled in playwriting with the derivative one-act play “A Summer Place,” a patently biographical play (or docu-drama) about Tennessee Williams and a (fictitious) last-minute interview, and his habit of going from town to town with a young companion. The play, according to Bergman, “is flawed by its own brilliant construction and the necessity for outside influences from the street below. These interruptions are as much visual as they are vocal and the script’s technique is more cinematic than stageworthy.”

Where ten years before he dedicated Dandelion Dreams and Other Poems to Margaret Nemerov, the widow of Howard Nemerov, this time Steinhardt dedicated the Key West book to poet laureate Richard Wilbur, who used to winter in Key West.

Steinhardt's fourth book was Letters to Ryan. This book departed from his usual fare by being patently autobiographical, detailing the experience of being a co-dependent with a lover on cocaine. Completely in verse diary form, the book is strongly revealing and descriptive. The poems detail the freshness of a new relationship, romance; then the succeeding adverse effects of drug addiction.

Gary Hirshberg, L.C.S.W., in his introduction to the book, said "To describe Letters to Ryan as a parable on co-dependency would certainly be accurate." He said, "in reading such raw and revealing lines as Steinhardt has written we are able to see a reflection of ourselves, we are able to step back and see ourselves as the boys we are—boys of such deep need:

Was he ever mine?

Was he ever his himself

To give for me?

(from "Discharged")

Hirshberg said the book "lays-bare our collective soul, it chronicles the dysfunction of our relationships, the hollowness of our attempts at love, the hopelessness of our ability to connect." Jane L. Anton, Ph.D. contributed an Afterword to the book. Artist George Towne contributed the cover art, originally entitled "Lucio on Tony's Bed."

Steinhardt's fifth book, Papa's Big Fish: Stories of Youthful Adventure at the Hemingway's in Key West, was his first book which was solely fiction. The book, categorized as historical fiction, has 15 chapters, each chapter being a separate adventure from the viewpoint of eight-year-old protagonist Gig Hemingway, one of Ernest Hemingway's children. The book details Steinhardt's considerable scholarship in Hemingway biography, offering a keen, light-hearted look at the Hemingway home in Key West during the 1930s. The book also contains a substantial appendix, listing the work Ernest Hemingway wrote while living in Key West from 1928 to 1939. The book serves a juvenile audience, while also maintaining an adult readership for the Hemingway trivia presented.

Steinhardt's sixth book, Sleeping with Rilke: Poems & Prayers, is a return to the poet's usual fare of Imagist poetry. The book is divided into three sections. The first section deals with everyday activities ("At the Launderette") and acquaintances ("Perennial"), and the second part deals with relationships, presumably the author's. The last section is notable in that it is similar to the last section of the earlier Dandelion Dreams and Other Poems, where he speaks extensively on subjects such as faith and doubt. Rainer Maria Rilke plays a considerable influence on this work, as Steinhardt dissects and searches for the meaning of life. The poem "The Jacob Ladder," is a strong example of Steinhardt's declarative imagery: We are counted once/To climb the rungs/'til limbs give way/(Or sight diminished)/To the extent/We are blind to the heights/We might have gained/Through clouds and sky/On our standing-rung;/When, having properly/Reached a destiny,/(We should have seen)/We step off in faith/(Or jump forward)/In our unfolding—/As a sprinter who springs/And finds his pace/In the gait of a level run—/And the ultimate/Finish-line.

Other poems, such as the title poem "Sleeping with Rilke" and "Atlantis Rising," are avant-garde and narrative, reminiscent of Richard Wilbur's earlier description of Steinhardt's poems as being exploratory in nature.

In 2011 Steinhardt began to appear in several television segments on KPLR Channel 11 in St. Louis. These included biographical remarks pertaining to several St. Louis authors such as Howard Nemerov and Tennessee Williams.

Presently Steinhardt is writing almost exclusively fiction, and divides his time between Florida and St. Louis.

== Bibliography ==
- The Painting Birds (1988)
- Voices: Poems from the Missouri Heartland (1994) (editor)
- B.J. Thomas: Back/Forward (1994)
- Dandelion Dreams and Other Poems (1999)
- Guardian of Grief: Poems of Giacomo Leopardi (2008) (editor)
- Standing Pelican: Key West Poems & Stories (2009)
- Papa's Big Fish: Stories of Youthful Adventure at the Hemingway's in Key West (2010)
- Letters to Ryan (2010)
- Sleeping with Rilke: Poems & Prayers (2010)
