= Don Doran =

American soccer player

Personal information
- Date of birth: March 3, 1954 (age 72)
- Place of birth: St. Louis, Missouri, U.S.
- Height: 5 ft 11 in (1.80 m)
- Position: Defender

College career
Years	Team	Apps	(Gls)
1973–1976	Saint Louis Billikens		

Senior career*
Years	Team	Apps	(Gls)
1977–1978	St. Louis Kutis		
1979–1980	St. Louis Steamers (indoor)	3	(0)
1981	Costa Mesa Cowboys		
1982–1983	Los Angeles Lazers (indoor)	15	(0)
- * Club domestic league appearances and goals

Don Doran is an American retired soccer defender who played professional in the Major Indoor Soccer League.

In 1977, the St. Louis Stars of the North American Soccer League drafted Doran, but did not sign him. He then played for St. Louis Kutis until he signed with the St. Louis Steamers of the Major Indoor Soccer League in 1980. In 1980, he was drafted by the California Sunshine of the American Soccer League. He may not have played for them. He did play amateur soccer in St. Louis with the Costa Mesa Cowboys in 1981. In 1982, he signed with the Los Angeles Lazers of MISL.

In 2009, Doran was inducted into the St. Louis Soccer Hall of Fame.

== See also ==
- Football in the United States
- List of football clubs in the United States
