= Steve Mizerany =

American businessman

Steve Mizerany, in a pose emblematic of his public persona

Steve Mizerany (died April 15, 2011) was an American business owner and media personality. Mizerany was known in St. Louis, Missouri for the outsized personality he displayed as the star of his own advertisements.

Mizerany grew up in the LaSalle Park neighborhood of St. Louis and was graduated from McKinley High School. He was the youngest of seven children; his parents were Lebanese Maronite immigrants. His father taught English to other Lebanese immigrants at St. Raymond’s Maronite Church.

In 1946 Steve’s two oldest brothers opened the Mizerany Brothers appliance store on Broadway. Steve Mizerany went to work for his brothers and handled the store's television advertisements. All television was live at that time, and Mizerany ad-libbed the commercials as the cameras were rolling. Here he developed his zany persona which attracted attention and some complaints.

In 1972, Mizerany opened the Mizerany-Farhatt New Deal Appliance Company next to Bevo Mill on Gravois Road in St. Louis with his childhood friend Joe Farhatt. Here he perfected his advertising style, an admixture of his distinct voice, enthusiastic persona, outlandish attire, slapstick humor, and stunts such as roller-skating in the store's aisles (he also sometimes skated during regular business, rolling up to customers and introducing himself). Taglines included the assertion that the store was home of the "decent boys".

Mizerany also guest-starred in other ads for other businesses.

After his death, Mizerany was honored by the St. Louis Board of Aldermen for his charitable activities which included organizing the annual St. Louis police relief celebrity ballgame.

Mizerany married Sue Grant in 1947; they were divorced in 1973. They had five children: Catherine Mizerany, Stephanie Dorris, Veronica Miller, Steve Mizerany, Jr. and Vincent Mizerany.
