= Haydee Campbell =

American educator

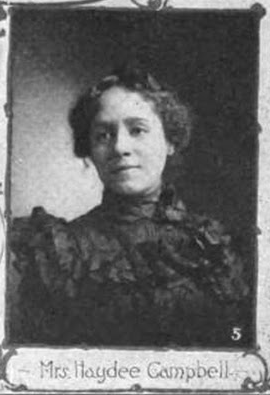
Haydee Campbell, in a 1903 publication

Haydee Campbell (died October 25, 1921) was an American educator, an advocate for kindergarten for African-American children. (Her first name is also spelled Haidee in some sources.)

== Early life ==
Haydee E. Benchley was born in Texas. She attended Oberlin College. She was the first black teacher to study with Susan Blow at the St. Louis Kindergarten Training School.

== Career ==
Campbell taught kindergarten in St. Louis, Missouri. In 1882, Haydee Campbell was hired to supervise kindergarten programs for African-American children in the public schools of St. Louis. Beginning in 1896, she chaired the Kindergarten Department of the National Association of Colored Women's Clubs. In 1899, she addressed the NACW national convention in Chicago on the topic "Why the National Association of Colored Women Should Devise Means for Establishing Kindergartens". An attendee reported, "Her enunciation was exquisite...her words were well chosen and her subject well handled." In 1903, she managed the kindergarten programming at the Tuskegee Institute Summer School for Teachers.

During World War I she was active with provisions for black soldiers in the War Camp Community Service at Manhattan, Kansas, until ill health took her from that work.

== Personal life ==
Haydee Benchley married J. Wesley Campbell; they had one daughter. Haydee Campbell died a widow in 1921, in St. Louis.
