= Sherman Silber =

American physician

Sherman J. Silber
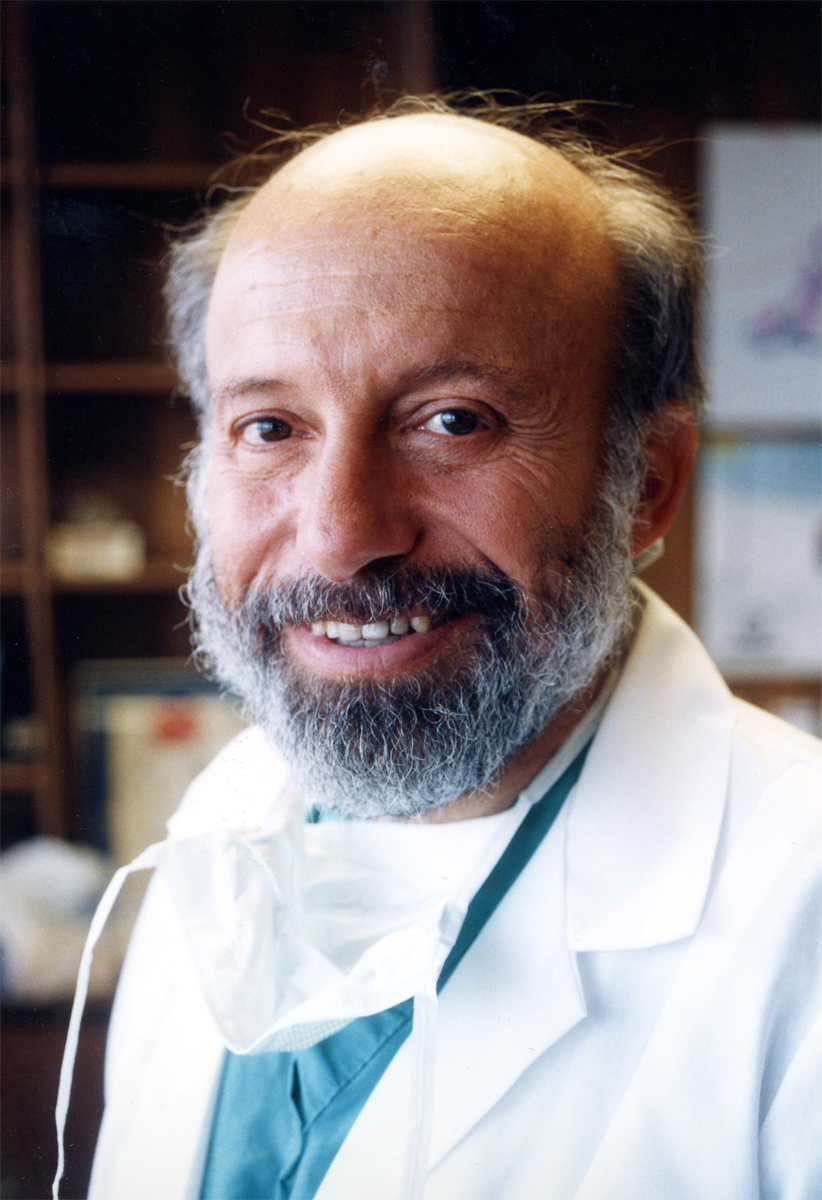
- Born: Chicago, Illinois
- Education: MD University of Michigan, Internship at Stanford University
- Medical career
- Profession: Doctor
- Field: Microsurgery
- Institutions: Infertility Center of St. Louis at St. Luke's Hospital; Public Health Service, Alaska
- Sub-specialties: Infertility
- Research: IVF, Ovarian Transplantation, Male Factor Infertility, Vasectomy Reversal

Sherman J. Silber is physician specializing in the field of infertility. He performed the world's first ovary and testicle transplants, created and popularized the microsurgical vasectomy reversal, and popularized ovarian tissue freezing to preserve female fertility. He developed the TESE-ICSI technique for extracting sperm from men with low or nonexistent sperm counts and direct injection of the sperm into the egg.

== Education ==
Silber graduated medical school from the University of Michigan in 1966, and thereafter completed post-graduate training in cardiac surgery at both Stanford University and University of Michigan.

== Career ==
Before completing his residency, Silber worked as a gynecologist for the U.S. Public Health Service in Alaska. He served as a village urologist for two years before returning the University of Michigan to study urology and transplantation. Silber became interested in microsurgical techniques for kidney transplantation. He took academic posts at the university of Melbourne Medical School in Australia and then the University of California Medical School in San Francisco.

While in Australia in 1975, Silber performed the world's first microsurgical vasectomy reversal and popularized the microscopic vasovasostomy. In 1976, Silber moved to St. Louis, Missouri, his wife's hometown, and joined St. Luke's Hospital. In 1978, he reported the first testicle transplant between two twin brothers.

In the 1990s, Silber and his colleagues at St. Luke's worked with a team at Brussels University to develop intracytoplasmic sperm injection (ICSI) in which a single sperm is selected to be microscopically injected into an egg. This procedure is coupled with the sperm retrieval method developed by Silber, which involves a single sperm retrieved by microsurgery directly from a patient's epidycimus.

Beginning in 1996, Silber began experimenting with freezing ovarian tissue to regraft into the ovaries of cancer patients who have compromised fertility after chemotherapy and radiation. In 2004, he successfully transplanted frozen ovarian tissue. In 2007, Silber completed the first successful whole ovary transplant. The surgery was performed at his clinic in St. Louis, Missouri.

As of 2014, Silber had removed, frozen, and replaced ovarian tissue in twelve women and done a series of ovarian tissue transplants in nine sets of identical twins. That year, he also traveled to China to complete China's first ovarian-tissue transplant.

In 2013, Silber became the medical director of the Infertility Center of St. Louis at St. Luke's Hospital in St. Louis, Missouri, where he has used his expertise to treat patients from around the world. Over his career, Silber has collaborated with medical research teams from the Massachusetts Institute of Technology, the University of Amsterdam, and the Kato Clinic in Tokyo, and has published more than 250 scientific papers and more than 50 teaching videos.

Additionally, Silber has studied fertility in animals and performed microscopic surgery on chimpanzees, South American bush dogs, Przewalski's horse, gorillas, wolves, and other endangered species.

=== Awards ===
In 1965, while at University of Michigan, Silber won the Hopwood Literary Award for Short Stories and Essays. Silber received the 2008 James B. Eads Award for innovation in engineering, technology, or an outstanding project with major impact. In 2009, he won the Tenth Royan International Research Award for his research in female fertility.

=== Books ===
Silber has authored four medical textbooks and five books on infertility and reproduction, including How to Get Pregnant, How Not to Get Pregnant, How to Get Pregnant with the New Technology and The Male: From Infancy to Old Age.

=== Media Appearances ===
He has appeared on the Donahue Show eight times since 1980, Good Morning America, the Today Show, The Oprah Winfrey Show, Gary Collins, Peter Jennings’ ABC Nightly News, and Ted Koppel’s Nightline. He has been a consultant numerous times on the Joan Rivers Show and ABC News, and has been a regular contributor many times on KMOX, WOR, and NPR radio. He was one of four physicians picked to be on the U.S. Congress Office of Technology Assessment study to help infertile couples in the United States.

In 2013, he completed the first IVF performed on live television as a Today Show segment.
