= Margaret McFadden =

American community leader

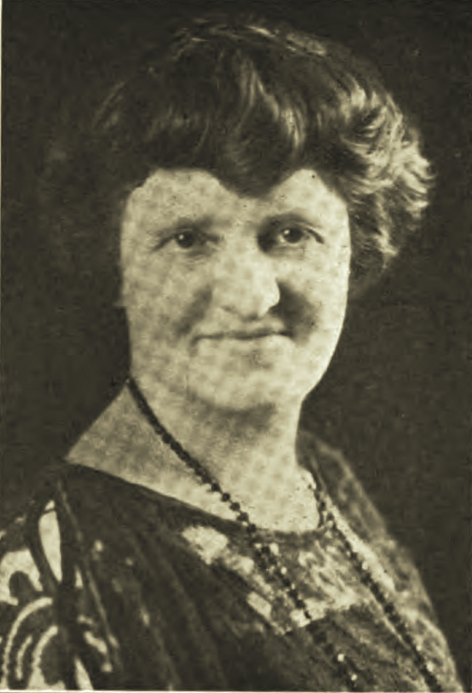
- Born: Margaret Bichsel (or Bischell, or Bischelt); 1870; St. Louis, Missouri, U.S.
- Died: December 7, 1932 (aged 61–62); Saint Paul, Minnesota, U.S.
- Occupation: community leader
- Spouse: Michael Joseph McFadden (m. 1891; died 1921)
- Children: 2

Margaret McFadden (née, Bichsel, or Bischell, or Bischelt; 1870 – December 7, 1932) was an American community leader, prominent in philanthropic, church, and women's organizations. She served as president of the Minnesota Public Health Association, and the Guild of Catholic Women, the latter being one of the leading and most powerful religious organizations in the region where she lived. She was also involved in charitable work to improve the lives of veterans and the poor.

== Early life and education ==
Margaret Bichsel (or Bischell, or Bischelt) (Note: The spelling of her maiden name is uncertain. At Logan (1912), Who Minnesota (1924), and The American Catholic... (1911), it is recorded as "Bischell". At Findagrave.com, it is recorded as "Bichsel". At Familysearch.com, her maiden name is recorded as "Bischelt", and her father's surname is recorded as "Bischell".) was born in St. Louis, Missouri, (Note: According to Who's who Among Minnesota Women (1924), McFadden was born in Wisconsin.) 1870. Her father, Georg Bichsel, was an extensive shipbuilder of St. Louis. Her mother, Elizabeth, born in Lorraine, France, 1831.

When a child, she lived to Winona, Minnesota.

She was a student in Arcadia, Wisconsin, and at the Winona Seminary, conducted by the Sisters of Saint Francis.

In 1884, she moved to Saint Paul, Minnesota.

== Career ==
McFadden held important roles in various Catholic charities. She was a member of the first executive board of the Catholic Infant Home, served as first vice president in 1913 and re-elected president in 1916, and served as a board member in 1921. She served as president of the Guild of Catholic Women, 1908 to 1913, during which time, membership increased from 25 to more than 800 members, departments were organized and the Guild was incorporated. She was the chair of the Guild's Juvenile Court, as well as a member of its executive board and the Guild Hall board for years. She was also the chair of the Minnesota Council of Catholic Women. She served as secretary of the Blessed Virgin Mary's Chapel Association. McFadden was a delegate to the national conference of Catholic Charities.

She was also involved in charitable work to improve the lives of veterans, for example, serving as chair of finances for the Aberdeen Veteran's Hospital. McFadden was the president of the first woman's Auxiliary, American Legion Post No. 8, also serving as vice-president of the state auxiliary, chair of poppy sales, membership committee for ex-service men's association of the state hospital committee, Legion Auxiliary. She was a member of the state executive board of the Armistice Day committee, war camp community service.

She was the program chair on numerous occasions including for: Washington's birthday, annual outing for the blind, social committee of the National Confectioners Association, midwinter breakfast of federated clubs, social committee of the Fourth District National Education Association, and Christmas seals.

She served as captain of the Community Chest drive, and directed the Red Cross parade.

She was active in working among the poor and was well known to the judge and officers of the juvenile court, who have often turned over to her and her associates the young girls who are brought into court, and whom she endeavored to help. McFadden was the director of the city's children's preventorium. She aided in changing the name of the Poor Farm to Ramsey County Home. McFadden was a member of the Goodfellow's executive committee, Belgian Relief, Mayor Herbert P. Keller's advisory board, Newsboy's club, and the committee benefit for flood sufferers.

== Personal life ==
In Winona, on April 7, 1891, she married Michael Joseph McFadden (1863-1921), (Note: According to Logan (1912) and The American Catholic Who's who (1911), the marriage occurred in 1890.) a prominent businessmen of Saint Paul. He was a wholesale and retail candy dealer. He came to St. Paul in 1881 and started a retail candy store, later engaging in the manufacturing and wholesale of candy.

They had two children, Francis Grover McFadden (1892–1986) and Virginia Helen McFadden (1897–1984).

Margaret McFadden died in St. Paul, December 7, 1932. Burial was at the city's Calvary Cemetery.
