= Stella De Mette =

American contralto opera singer (1891–1989)

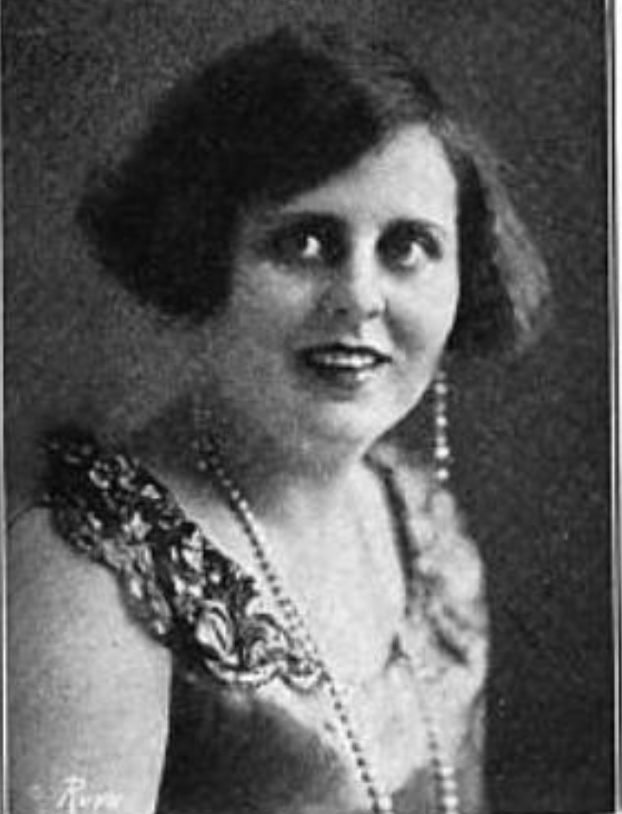
- Liazza in Musical Advance in 1925
- Born: May 27, 1891; St. Louis, Missouri, United States
- Died: May 15, 1989 (aged 97); Oakland, Missouri, United States
- Occupation: Contralto grand opera singer
- Employer: San Carlo Opera Company
- Spouse: Francesco Liazza

Stella De Mette Liazza (May 27, 1891 – May 15, 1989) was an American contralto grand opera singer. She performed in European opera houses and in Broadway productions in the United States.

== Biography ==
De Mette was raised in St. Louis, Missouri, United States to Italian and Spanish parents. She began singing aged 4. The Italian opera tenor Enrico Caruso heard her singing as a child and encouraged her to study in Italy. In 1908, Liazza moved to Milan with her grandmother in order to study opera. She debuted as a mezzo-soprano in Genoa in the opera Cavalleria Rusticana, aged 19, but was later known as a contralto.

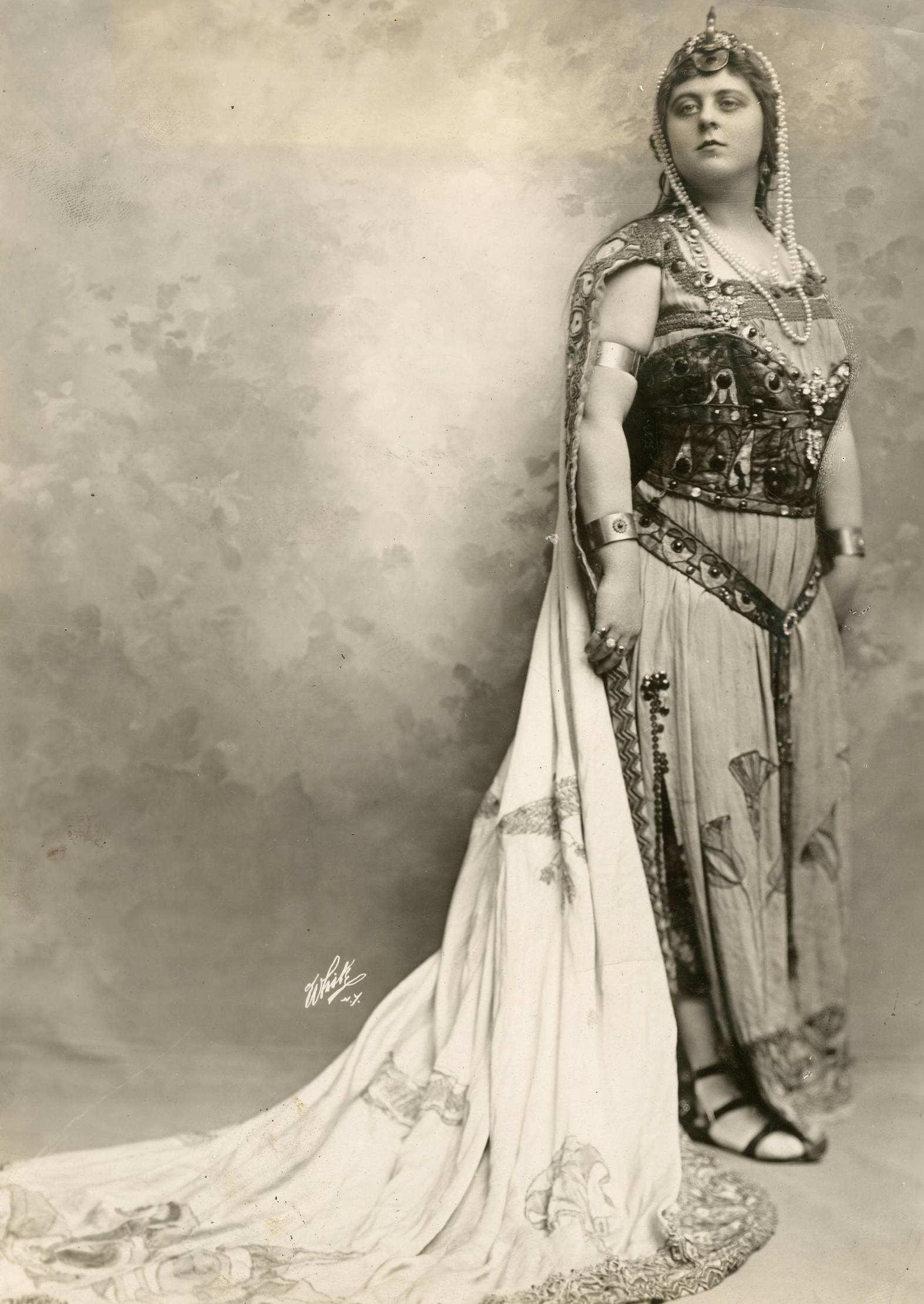
In costume, 1919

After returning to the United States, De Mette sang at the Metropolitan Opera in New York City. She performed in 500 performances of Carmen and 700 performances of Aida. She also acted in 14 dramatic productions on Broadway.

De Mette married Francesco Liazza, the San Carlo Opera Company's first trombonist and orchestra manager, who she met while singing for the company.

After her husband's death in 1942, Liazza retired from performing and taught at Villa Duchesne School for five years and at Maryville College for 11 years. She died on May 15, 1989, in Oakland, Missouri, United States, aged 97.
