= Stan Masters =

American painter (1922–2005)

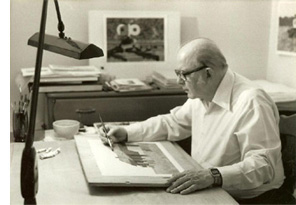
- Stan Masters at work in 1985
- Born: 4 July 1922; Kirkwood, MO
- Died: 13 December 2005 (aged 83); Maplewood, MO
- Known for: Painting
- Movement: Realist

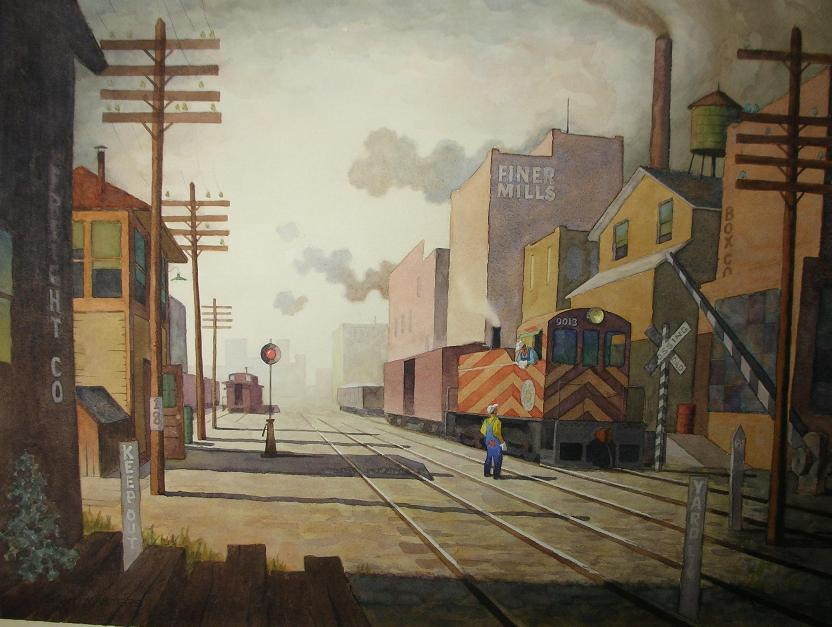
Yard Switcher, Collection of the St. Louis Mercantile Library

Stan Masters (July 4, 1922 – December 13, 2005) was an American realist painter from the St. Louis suburb of Kirkwood, Missouri.

== Life of Stan Masters ==
Masters was the son and grandson of railroad workers. Raised during the Great Depression in the one-room Missouri Pacific Railroad section house located between the railroad tracks in downtown Kirkwood, his home had no running water or electricity. Trains passed within 6 feet of the porch.

After the United States' entrance into World War II, Masters left Kirkwood for the Army in 1942. After being stationed in Pennsylvania, he served combat duty in Italy in 1944 and 1945. After the war, Masters applied to art schools in 1946. Rejected by schools in St. Louis, he returned to Pennsylvania to attend the Dauphin School of Fine Arts in Philadelphia on the GI Bill.

Masters returned to St. Louis in 1948, where he spent the next 20 years working in commercial art at various advertising agencies. In 1962, Masters made a short film called The Storm, which won five awards from the Photographic Society of America and also won at the Cannes Film Festival in the Amateur Division in 1963.

In 1970, Masters decided to devote his career entirely to his art. By 1971, he had committed himself exclusively to watercolor. Despite favorable reviews from critics, and having won both local and national awards, Masters' watercolors did not sell well in his lifetime. Perhaps discouraged by the commercial market, Masters retreated to the solitude of his studio at his home in Maplewood, Missouri. Much of his portfolio was later discovered in his studio, unseen by others, after his death in 2005.

== Art ==
Masters studied, and was influenced by, the works of Winslow Homer, Andrew Wyeth, and Edward Hopper. His paintings characteristically portrayed the familiar themes of railroads, cityscapes, and rural imagery which were emblematic of his hard scrabble Missouri childhood. Masters' works possess an endowment of profound calm, and their loneliness seems to guide the viewer to consider what is happening outside of the picture.

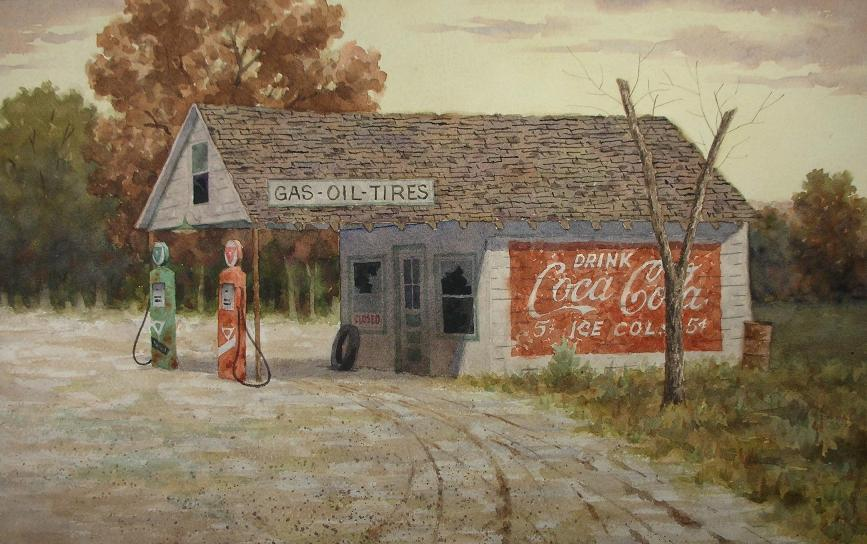
Gas-Oil-Tires

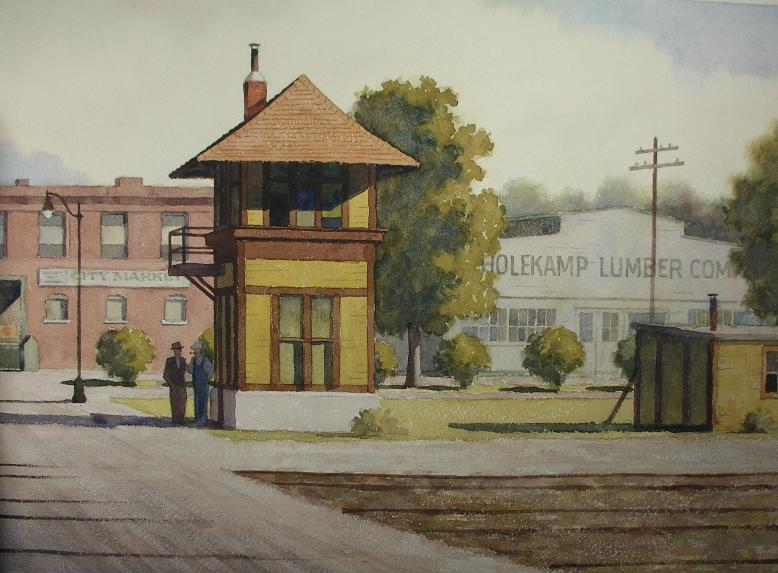
Holekamp Lumber

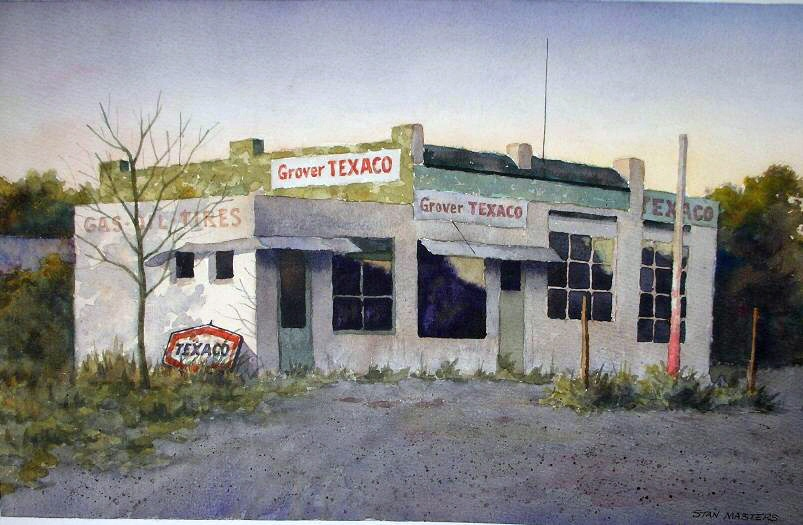
Grover Texaco

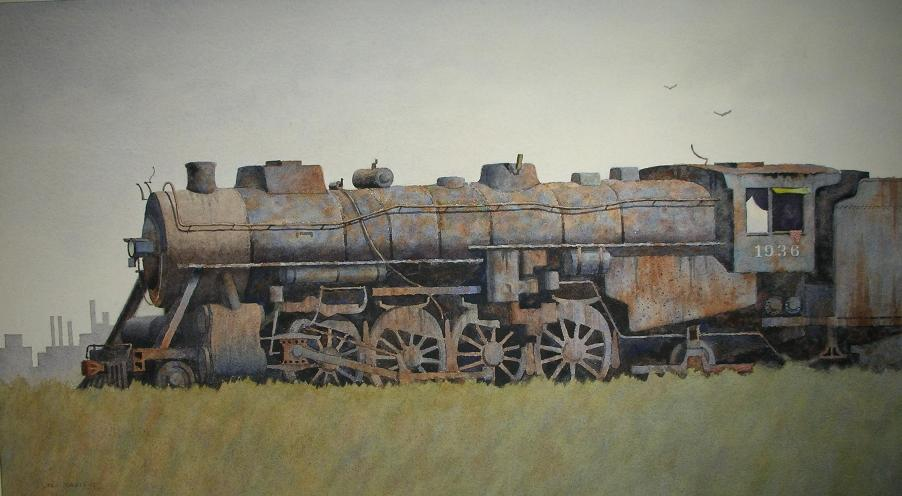
Once, a King
