= Todd Thomas (designer) =

American creative director and fashion designer

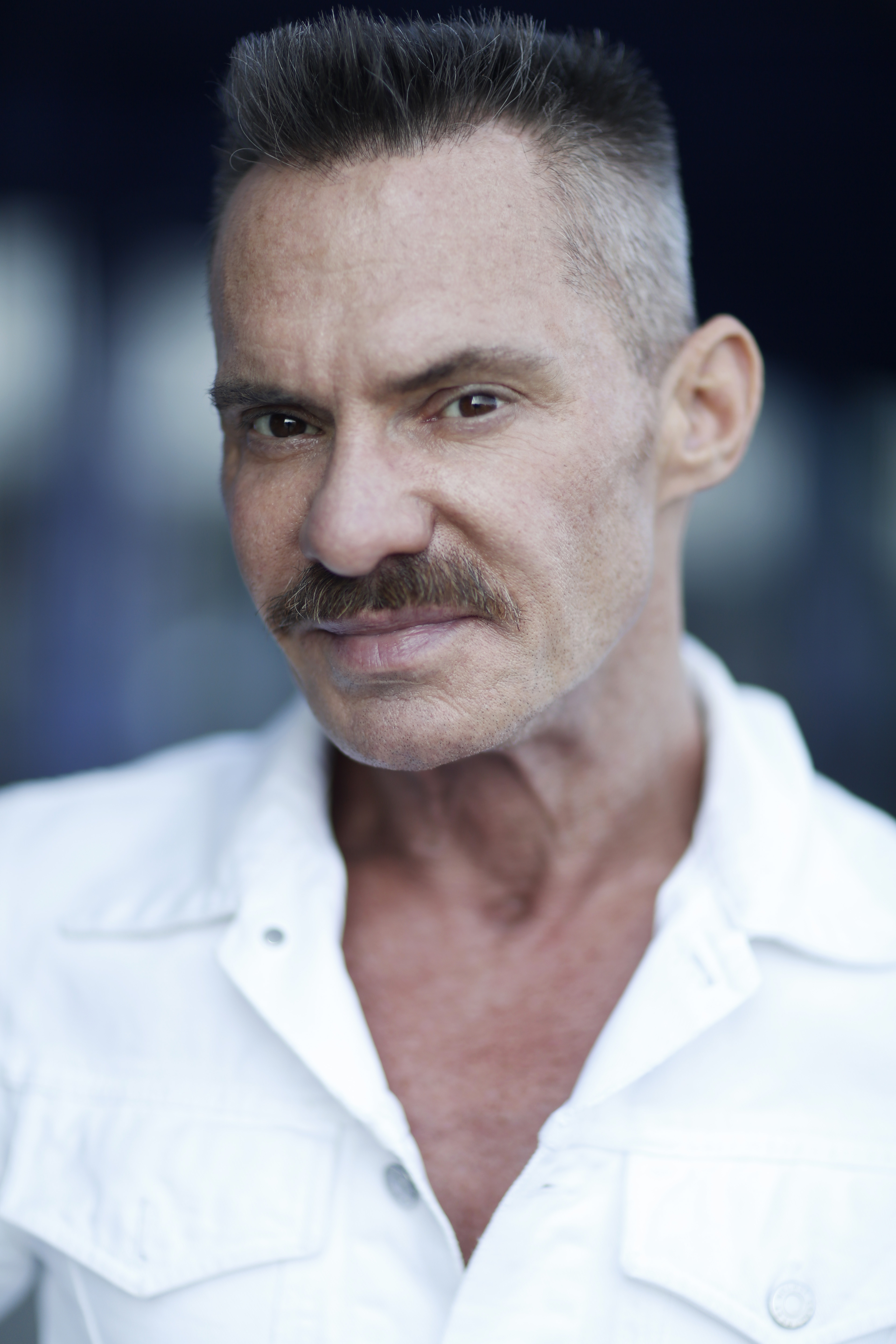
- Born: September 19, 1961 (age 63); Murphysboro, Illinois, United States
- Occupation(s): Fashion designer, tailor, costume designer

Todd Thomas (born 1961) is an American cross-disciplinary artist, director, educator, and fashion designer based in New York City. For over forty years he has worked tailoring for fashion shows, photo, television, film, performances, tours, and is known for his eleven-year work creating the Victoria's Secret Fashion Show during its heyday. Thomas currently serves as the founder, director, and designer of his own independent label Todd Thomas.

== Early life and education ==
Todd Thomas was born in 1961 in Murphysboro, Illinois. At the age of 17, his dream of becoming a fashion designer and interest in the arts drove him to St. Louis, Missouri where he was able to establish himself more creatively. Thomas spent his time cutting and trimming for clothes manufactures and found inspiration from the punk rock counterculture surrounding him. He credits much of his early education in the industry to the St. Louis community who helped him discover his identity and place in the 1980s "Do-it-Yourself" culture of the time.

== Career ==
In 1983, Thomas moved to New York City. He broadened his understanding of art and design through working in theatre, film, and the fashion houses of Seventh Avenue. His work in costuming and wardrobe can be seen in the films Angela (1995), Office Killer (1997), Trouble on the Corner (1997), and the band Heloise and the Savoir Faire's music video "Time Lords" (2013).

From 2005 to 2013, Thomas worked as one of the designers for Victoria's Secret Fashion Show in Collection Production.

From 2012 to 2014, Thomas served as Strategic Design Consultant and Menswear Design Director of the sustainable clothing brand Ramblers Way Farm.

Thomas showcased his work from both Ramblers Way and Victoria's Secret in an installation titled "Off the Rails". The exhibit was held for a month at the Des Lee Gallery courtesy of the St. Louis Craft Alliance.

In 2016, Thomas joined as the Senior Director of Barrett Barrera Projects's New York Office. He focused on developmental projects including Charliewood New York, Christeene Vale and PJ Raval's artist residency with Justin Vivian Bond, and Spacewalker—a 2018 collaborative project with Christine Corday. During his time with Barrett Barrera, Thomas also co-hosted the Apple Podcast Series Art is a Verbwith Susan Barrett in 2020. Through conversations with leaders and multidisciplinary creatives, their 10-episode season defines art as the "ongoing process of re-constructing our world, and creatives are the harbingers of a new reality, with the ability to catalyze real change."

Thomas last showed a studio collection in 2020 titled Past Present Future — examining the role of consumer participation in the greater fashion process and system. His Tribeca installation combined ready-to-wear fashion with bespoke, resulting in elegant, sustainable, and functional pieces. In the Present section of his collection, Thomas collaborated with longtime friend and painter, Belinda Lee, to transform her abstract squiggle paintings into printed fabrics. Past Present Future debuted at New York Fashion Week and showcased pieces that were sold directly to consumers and specialty partners.

He has taught as an adjunct professor at Parsons School of Design, worked as a career mentor in the LGBTQ+ Ali Forney Center, and has been featured as a guest speaker at Washington University’s Sam Fox School of Design & Visual Arts during Fashion Lab's Yarn lecture series.

The website Fashion Week Online (FWO) states Thomas possess "keen observational skills in identifying and highlighting the aesthetic significance" within the New York Cultural scene "that has made him the go to collaborator / consultant for leaders within these various scenes."
