= Pat Baker (soccer) =

American soccer player and coach (born 1962)

Personal information
- Date of birth: November 25, 1962 (age 63)
- Place of birth: St. Louis, Missouri, U.S.
- Position: Goalkeeper

Youth career
- 1981–1984: Saint Louis Billikens

Senior career*
Years	Team	Apps	(Gls)
1985–1988	St. Louis Steamers (indoor)	30	(0)

Managerial career
- 1988: STLCC-Florissant Valley (assistant)
- * Club domestic league appearances and goals

Pat Baker (born November 25, 1962) is an American retired soccer goalkeeper who played professionally in the Major Indoor Soccer League.

Baker attended St. Louis University, playing on the men's soccer team from 1981 to 1984. In June 1985, the Tacoma Stars selected Baker in the second round of the Major Indoor Soccer League draft. The Stars cut him in September. He then signed two ten-day contracts with the St. Louis Steamers. The Steamers picked him up for the 1986–87 season, then signed him to a two-year contract on June 3, 1987. The Steamers folded in 1988, but Baker had been hampered by injuries the entire season. In the fall of 1988, he served as an assistant coach with the St. Louis Community College-Florissant Valley women's soccer team as it won the national junior college championship.
