= Charles Guenther =

American poet

Charles Guenther (April 29, 1920 – July 24, 2008) was an American poet, critic and translator. He was born in St. Louis, Missouri. His book, Phrase/Paraphrase, was nominated for the Pulitzer Prize in Poetry.

Guenther translated thousands of poems into English from languages such as French, Italian, Spanish, Eskimo, Greek, German and Hungarian. He corresponded with scores of authors, including Ezra Pound, Kirkwood, Mo. native Marianne Moore, and E. E. Cummings. Ezra Pound, who Guenther met in 1951, was a great influence on Guenther's work, particularly his translations.

Guenther also wrote original formal and free verse poetry, in addition to his translations. He was a literary critic for 50 years.

== Early life ==
Guenther started writing and translating poetry at age 15 while a student at Roosevelt High School in St. Louis, Missouri. In his essay, "On the Art of Translation," he said "I spent hours in the library reading poetry, especially European poetry, in translation at first and later in the original language."

Upon graduation from high school at age 17, Guenther worked as a copy boy for the St. Louis Star-Times. This work, Guenther said, was influential on his experience as a writer. "Newspaper people—then, anyway—were a special and temperamental breed. It exposed you to the human comedy.”

He was a graduate of Harris Teachers College, earned a master's degree at Webster College (now Webster University) and did doctoral work in languages at St. Louis University.

== Career ==
During World War II he translated information for the U.S. Army Air Forces, tracking such details as the opening and closing of foreign runways. He worked at various times as a historian, librarian and supervisory cartographer for the U.S. Air Force. He was employed at the Aeronautical Chart and Information Center of St. Louis for 30 years.

In 1953 Guenther began writing literary reviews for the St. Louis Post-Dispatch, retiring from that position in 2003. He also wrote for the St. Louis Globe-Democrat from 1972 to 1982. Guenther said he considered reviewing a "civic honor." In his work as a newspaper book critic, he reviewed work by hundreds of authors, such as Seamus Heaney, Ted Hughes, William Stafford, Mona Van Duyn and Anthony Hecht.

== Original poetry ==
Charles Guenther was prolific in writing original poetry. He wrote in traditional rhyming verse; while frequently employing free verse. His subjects were varied, from wintry rural scenes "Snow Country", regional "Missouri Woods", and nature "Spring Catalog".

The poem "Three Faces of Autumn," (from the book Phrase/Paraphrase) is an example of Guenther's sometimes concise, clipped style:

Now sunfire stains
the tupelos
and the shadows
in trapeziums
off the haybarns
straggle and gather
by rocks and birches
where the crickets'
still-fast whirr
cries against the closed
season

(from Part I, "Three Faces of Autumn")

Other poems, like "Escalator" and "Arch" were more experimental and avant-garde. Guenther also wrote elegies and poems commemorative of places, people and events.

Guenther also worked tirelessly to promote poetry and poets. He was a frequent correspondent and mentored many younger poets. For 15 years he served as Regional Midwest Vice-president for the Poetry Society of America.

== Translation work ==
Guenther, who translated since his teens, was prolific in translating poetry from roughly a dozen foreign languages. Many poets were translated into English for the first time by Guenther.

In an essay entitled "Reflections," from the book Three Faces of Autumn," Guenther credits Ezra Pound as an early influence on his work. The two met in 1951 when Guenther visited Pound while he was incarcerated at St. Elizabeths Hospital in Washington, D.C. Guenther said, "It was the start of a lively correspondence with this fascinating, obstinate poet who had put new vigor into American literature."

Guenther was also versatile in his translation work. He translated into English from such varying poets as Edgar Degas, Paul Valéry, Pablo Neruda, Salvatore Quasimodo and Dante Alighieri. Guenther also extensively translated the works of Garcilaso de la Vega, Juan Ramón Jiménez, Jules Laforgue and Jean Wahl.

Most of his translations and poetry were published in literary publications, including The American Poetry Review, Black Mountain Review, The Formalist and The Kenyon Review

Italy in 1973 decorated Guenther with a knighthood with its Commendatore Ordine al Merito della Repubblica (Order of Merit of the Italian Republic). Other nations also honored Guenther for his work in translating their native poets into English, many for the first time. About the work of translation, Guenther wrote, "In a great poem there is something magic, a haunting spirit. It's so rare that you keep looking for it.”

In an essay concerning the craft of translation in Guardian of Grief: Poems of Giacomo Leopardi, Guenther claimed most of his translations were “reformations,” recasting “a foreign poem into its original form or free verse form.” Guenther said “My own practice when translating early poets is to place them in their own time, with a hint of antiquity, avoiding the grossly archaic language of their contemporaries. My purpose is to make a poem from a poem.”

The last stanza of Guenther's translation of Giacomo Leopardi's "The Calm After the Storm," is an example of the Italian translations for which he was renowned:

O kindly nature,
These are your gifts.
These are the delights
You offer mortals. It’s a pleasure
For us to be relieved of pain,
You spread pain freely; grief
Rises spontaneously; and that bit of joy
Which by miracle and prodigy sometimes
Is born of anxiety, it is a great gain. A human
Progeny dear to those eternal ones!
You're lucky
Indeed if you can breathe again
After some grief: and blessed
If death heals every sorrow.

In the Introduction to Three Faces of Autumn, Guenther said recognition was important, but “It is the work, not the prize or the honor, that matters most. The work endures.”

A poem by José Agustín Goytisolo (entitled "The Difficult Poem"), which Guenther translated and is the last selection in The Hippopotamus: Selected Translations 1945–1985, seems to sum up the translation process:

The poem is inside
and doesn’t want to get out.
It pounds in my head
doesn’t want to get out.
I shout, I tremble,
and it doesn’t want to get out.
I call it by name
and it doesn’t want to get out.
Later down the street
it stands before me.

== Awards ==
- The Order of Merit of the Italian Republic (1973)
- James Joyce Award, Poetry Society of America (1974)
- French-American Bicentennial Medal (1976)
- Witter Bynner Translation Grant, Poetry Society of America (1979)
- Missouri Arts Award (2001)
- St. Louis Arts Award (2001)
- Emmanuel Robles International Award in Poetry (2002)
