= Earl Barban =

American racing spotter

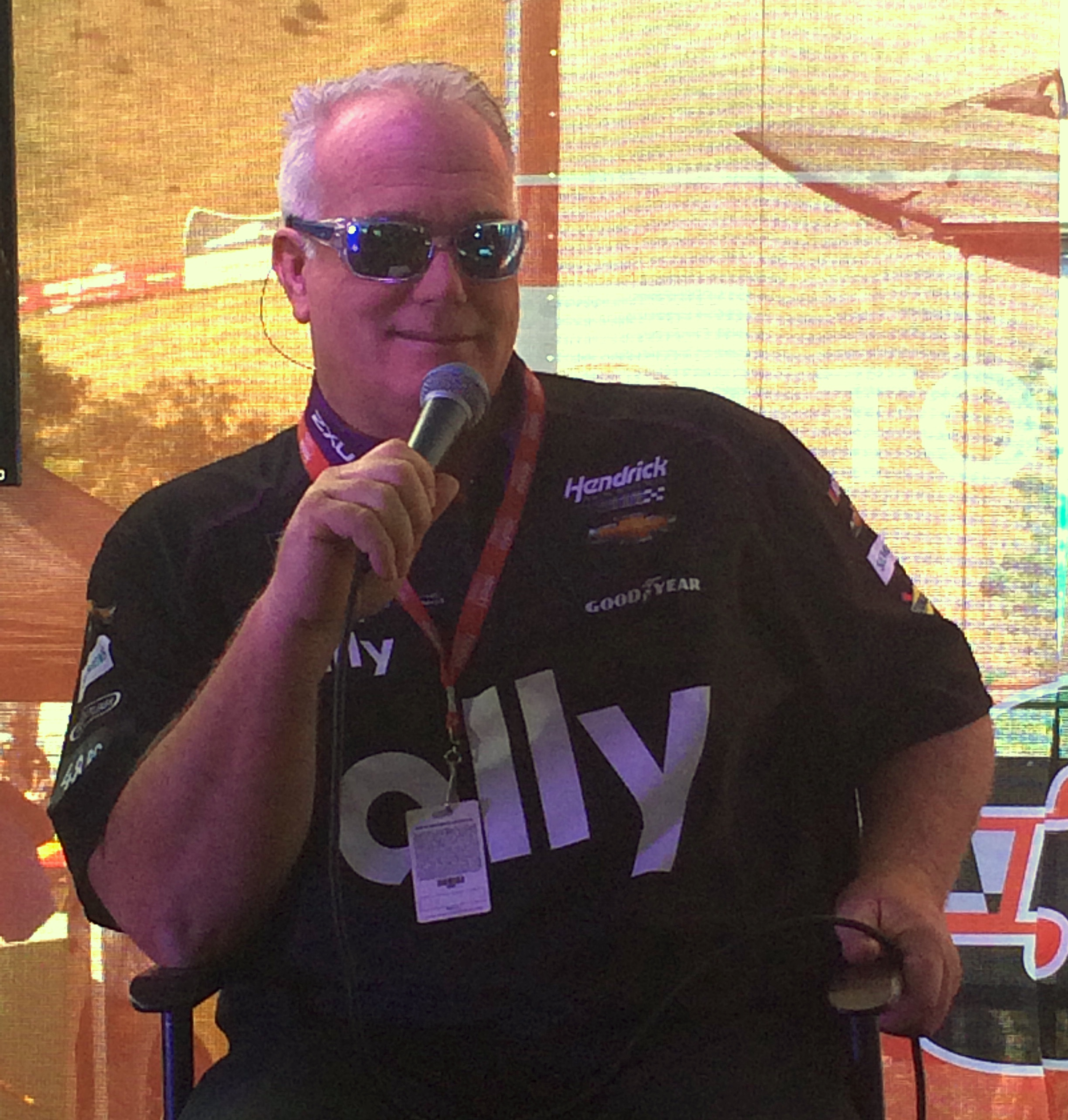
- Barban at Sonoma Raceway in 2019

Personal information
- Full name: Earl Paul Barban Jr.
- Nicknames: "The Duke", "Big Earl"
- Born: October 5, 1964 (age 62) St. Louis, Missouri, U.S.
- Education: St. Louis Community College–Florissant Valley; University of Missouri

Sport
- Sport: Auto racing
- Position: Spotter
- League: NASCAR Cup Series
- Team: 84. (Jimmie Johnson) Legacy Motor Club

Achievements and titles
- National finals: 2006, 2009–2010, 2013, 2016 Cup Series; 2014, 2017–2018 Xfinity Series

Earl Paul Barban Jr. (born October 5, 1964) is an American stock car racing spotter and former team owner.

He is a five-time Cup Series champion with Jimmie Johnson and has won three Xfinity titles with JR Motorsports' Chase Elliott, William Byron, and Tyler Reddick.

== Early life ==
Barban grew up in St. Louis and attended Jennings High School in Jennings, Missouri. During his youth, he had numerous jobs beginning with handing out pizza flyers at the age of 13; other occupations included being a cook at Steak 'n Shake, operating a forklift, driving an airport bus, and applying deodorant balls for Ban Roll-On. In 2020, he noted that his father "used to make fun of me that I had 21 jobs and 21 cars before I was 21 years old."

In 1983, he enlisted in the United States Marine Corps Reserve, where he served as a truck driver until 1988 and received the Navy Achievement Medal. He is an alumnus of St. Louis Community College–Florissant Valley and the University of Missouri.

== Racing career ==
Barban began his involvement in motorsports as a mechanic for a friend's sprint car racing team, followed by a brief driving stint at Pevely Speedway in St. Louis.

He was later hired by Penske Racing, where he worked a variety of roles including souvenir sales and driving the team's hauler. In conjunction with his hauler duties, he was a member of Penske driver Rusty Wallace's pit crew as the gas man. Barban was promoted to jackman and mechanic in 1997, followed by becoming Wallace's spotter in 2002. He served in the role for much of the year outside of the Coca-Cola 600 when he returned to being the jackman. In November, he was involved in a motorcycle accident while riding to North Carolina Speedway, leading to three broken ribs, a punctured lung, and a ruptured spleen; he returned to his post for preseason testing in January 2003.

In 1995, Barban fielded a truck for Rusty's brother Kenny Wallace in the NASCAR SuperTruck Series, an effort that was supported by Penske. Wallace ran three races for Barban that year in the No. 90 Ford, recording two top-ten finishes and a best run of fourth at Martinsville Speedway, before moving to Penske's own Truck team for 1996.

When Wallace retired after the 2005 season, Barban moved to Hendrick Motorsports' No. 48 team of Jimmie Johnson. Barban's first race as Johnson's spotter was the 2006 Daytona 500, which he ultimately won. Johnson would win that year's championship, though Barban left the team for Yates Racing and Stevie Reeves took over as spotter. He returned to the No. 48 team in 2009, and the duo scored four more titles from 2009 to 2010, 2013, and 2016.

Barban also works at the NASCAR Xfinity Series level for Hendrick affiliate JR Motorsports. Overseeing the team's No. 9 car, he won championships in 2014, 2017, and 2018 with Chase Elliott, William Byron, and Tyler Reddick. Prior to JRM, he was the spotter for Rusty Wallace Racing's No. 64 team in 2006.
