= 1983 Golden Bay Earthquakes season =

Golden Bay Earthquakes
1983 season
- Coach: Dragan Popovic
- Stadium: Spartan Stadium
- NASL: Division: 2nd Overall: 3rd
- NASL Playoffs: Semifinals
- National Challenge Cup: Did not enter
- Top goalscorer: Steve Zungul (16)
- Average home league attendance: 11,933

The 1983 Golden Bay Earthquakes season was the tenth for the Earthquakes franchise in the North American Soccer League. They finished second in the Western Division and defeated the Chicago Sting in the playoff quarterfinals. The Earthquakes' run came to an end in the semifinals when the Toronto Blizzard earned two shutout wins.

== Squad ==
The 1983 squad

Note: Flags indicate national team as defined under FIFA eligibility rules; some limited exceptions apply. Players may hold more than one non-FIFA nationality.

No.	Pos.	Nation	Player
1	GK	USA	Bob Rigby
2	DF	YUG	Ned Verlasevic
3	DF	USA	Mike Hunter
4	DF	USA	Jim McAlister
5	DF	ENG	Steve Litt
7	FW	ENG	Chris Dangerfield
9	MF	USA	Germain Iglesias
10	FW	NED	Jan Goossens
11	FW	YUG	Steve Zungul
12	MF	MEX	Leonardo Cuellar

No.	Pos.	Nation	Player
—	MF	USA	Eric Tate
13	MF	POL	Stan Terlecki
14	DF	YUG	Mihalj Keri
16	FW	ENG	Godfrey Ingram
17	FW	USA	Derek Sanderson
19	DF	CAN	George Katakalidis
20	GK	USA	Tim Hanley
21	DF	USA	Fernando Clavijo
22	DF	USA	Barney Boyce
31	GK	NIR	Bill Irwin

== Competitions ==
=== NASL ===
==== Season ====
Date	Opponent	Venue	Result	Scorers
May 22, 1983	Vancouver Whitecaps	H	2–1	Terlecki, Zungul
May 25, 1983	New York Cosmos	A	1–5	
May 27, 1983	Team America	A	1–0	Terlecki
May 30, 1983	Tulsa Roughnecks	H	3–1	Zungul (3)
June 4, 1983	Montreal Manic	H	7–1	Goossens, Zungul (3), Iglesias, Litt, Ingram
June 11, 1983	New York Cosmos	H	3–1	Terlecki, Ingram, Zungul
June 15, 1983	Seattle Sounders	A	1–1*	Dangerfield
June 18, 1983	Tampa Bay Rowdies	H	1–0	Goossens
June 22, 1983	Team America	H	3–0	Cuellar, Zungul (2)
June 26, 1983	Toronto Blizzard	A	1–5	
June 29, 1983	Fort Lauderdale Strikers	A	2–3	Terlecki, Zungul
July 4, 1983	Tampa Bay Rowdies	A	2–1	Goossens (2)
July 6, 1983	Seattle Sounders	H	2–2*	Goossens (2)
July 9, 1983	San Diego Sockers	H	2–1	Goossens, Iglesias
July 13, 1983	Seattle Sounders	A	5–2	Dangerfield, Ingram, Terlecki, Iglesias, Goossens
July 17, 1983	Vancouver Whitecaps	A	1–2	Goossens
July 20, 1983	Tampa Bay Rowdies	H	2–1	Goossens, Ingram
July 23, 1983	Chicago Sting	A	0–2	
July 27, 1983	Montreal Manic	A	3–3*	Ingram (2), Terlecki
July 30, 1983	Fort Lauderdale Strikers	A	1–3	Ingram
August 3, 1983	Toronto Blizzard	H	2–2*	Terlecki, Zungul
August 6, 1983	Tulsa Roughnecks	A	2–1	Ingram (2)
August 10, 1983	San Diego Sockers	A	1–2	Ingram
August 13, 1983	Chicago Sting	H	3–2	Ingram (2), Goossens
August 17, 1983	Fort Lauderdale Strikers	H	5–3	Terlecki, Ingram, Dangerfield (3)
August 20, 1983	San Diego Sockers	H	4–2	Terlecki (2), Ingram, Zungul
August 24, 1983	Vancouver Whitecaps	A	1–2	Zungul
August 27, 1983	San Diego Sockers	A	2–3	Goossens, Zungul
August 31, 1983	Vancouver Whitecaps	H	3–0	Ingram, Zungul, Terlecki
September 3, 1983	Seattle Sounders	H	2–1	Cuellar, Iglesias

==== Playoffs ====
Date	Opponent	Venue	Result	Scorers
September 7, 1983	Chicago Sting	H	6–1	Zungul (2), Goossens, Cuellar, Terlecki (2)
September 12, 1983	Chicago Sting	A	0–1	
September 14, 1983	Chicago Sting	H	5–2	Terlecki (3), Zungul, Goossens
September 17, 1983	Toronto Blizzard	H	0–0*	
September 22, 1983	Toronto Blizzard	A	0–2	

* = Shootout

==== Standings ====
Western Division	W	L	GF	GA	PT
Vancouver Whitecaps	24	6	63	34	187
Golden Bay Earthquakes	20	10	71	54	169
Seattle Sounders	12	18	62	61	119
San Diego Sockers	11	19	53	65	106
