= McCluer North High School =

American high school in Florissant, Missouri

Location
- 705 Waterford Drive; Florissant, Missouri 63033; United States; 38.7902°N 90.3031°W

Information
- Type: Public high school
- Motto: Home of the Stars
- Established: 1971; 55 years ago
- Principal: Kaylan Holloway
- Faculty: 100+
- Teaching staff: 87.50 (on an FTE basis)
- Grades: 9–12
- Enrollment: 1,136 (2022–23)
- Student to teacher ratio: 12.98
- Colors: Navy and silver
- Athletics conference: Suburban Conference
- Nickname: Stars
- Website: mnhs.fergflor.org

McCluer North High School (founded 1971) is a public school in Florissant, Missouri, United States in the St. Louis metropolitan area. The McCluer North campus is centrally located in the Ferguson-Florissant School District. Located in a residential area, the campus is bounded by Waterford Drive, St. Catherine and Parker Road. Facing the site is the Florissant Civic Center and its 20-acre (8.1 ha) park-like setting.

Immediately adjacent are the former District Administrative Offices that included services for students and families in the Community School Program, PROBE Gifted Program, comprehensive Early Education services and the Child Development Center, a professionally run day care center that operates in conjunction with McCluer North's Child Development classes. On the Parker Road side of the campus, McCluer North backs up to Parker Road Elementary School.

McCluer North was designed to provide adaptable and flexible space for a variety of instructional activities that include large-group presentations, small-group work and independent study. The multi-level building features a Student Concourse and commons area that has a cafeteria and an outdoor plaza where staff and students can socialize.

A focal point in the school is the Instructional Materials Center (IMC), which serves as a library center where students can conduct research, independent study, guided or independent reading. The Counseling Center, located in the IMC, provides a full range of services for students.

During her 2008 bid for the presidency, Senator Hillary Clinton made a campaign stop at McCluer North. Bill and Chelsea Clinton also attended the campaign rally, which was held in the school's gymnasium.

== Notable alumni ==
- Gretchen Bangert, politician
- Barrett Brooks, former NFL player and current radio personality
- Chingy, rapper and entertainer
- Bob Christian, former NFL player (Atlanta Falcons)
- Sally Hampton, writer, producer
- Kathleen Madigan, comedian
- Jon Vaughn, former NFL player (New England Patriots)
- Pete Weber, hall of fame professional bowler (dropped out to join Pro Bowlers Tour)
- Shandi Finnessey, Miss USA 2004 and Miss Universe 2004 first runner-up
- Mike O'Mara, former St. Louis County Councilman
- Aaron Mallett (born 1994), American hurdler
- Truth Hurts, American R&B singer, songwriter and actress
