= Chris Kenny (disambiguation) =

Chris Kenny (born 1962) is an Australian journalist.

Chris Kenny may also refer to:

- Chris Kenny (boxing trainer) (1937–2016), Irish-born New Zealand boxing coach
- Chris Kenny (soccer) (born 1952), American soccer player
