= Michael O'Mara =

Michael or Mike O'Mara may refer to:

- Michael O'Mara (musician) (born 1985), original guitarist and backup vocalist of the American indie rock band Sleepaway
- Mike O'Mara (politician), member of St. Louis County Council
- Michael J. O'Mara (1840–1892), lawyer and politician in Newfoundland
- Michael O'Mara Books
