= Clive Griffiths (footballer) =

Welsh footballer (1955–2022)

Personal information
- Full name: Clive Leslie Griffiths
- Date of birth: 22 January 1955
- Place of birth: Pontypridd, Wales
- Date of death: 29 April 2022 (aged 67)
- Place of death: Kansas, U.S.
- Height: 5 ft 10 in (1.78 m)
- Position: Defender

Youth career
- Manchester United

Senior career*
Years	Team	Apps	(Gls)
1973–1975	Manchester United	7	(0)
1974	→ Plymouth Argyle (loan)	11	(0)
1975–1977	Tranmere Rovers	59	(0)
1975–1977	→ Chicago Sting (loan)	44	(2)
1977–1979	Chicago Sting	82	(0)
1979–1980	Tulsa Roughnecks (indoor)	12	(1)
1980	Tulsa Roughnecks	16	(0)
1980–1981	Chicago Horizon (indoor)	40	(1)
1981–1985	Kansas City Comets (indoor)	112	(2)
- * Club domestic league appearances and goals

Clive Leslie Griffiths (22 January 1955 – 29 April 2022) was a Welsh footballer.

Griffiths was born in Pontypridd on 22 January 1955. He played for Manchester United, Plymouth Argyle and Tranmere Rovers. He also played in the NASL between 1975 and 1980 for the Chicago Sting and Tulsa Roughnecks and for the Chicago Horizon and Kansas City Comets of the Major Indoor Soccer League.

In 1983, Griffiths was diagnosed with cancer, and continued to play while receiving chemotherapy.

Griffiths died in Kansas on 29 April 2022, at the age of 67.
