= Ray Schnettgoecke =

American soccer player

Personal information
- Date of birth: March 2, 1956 (age 70)
- Place of birth: St. Louis, Missouri, United States
- Position: Defender

College career
Years	Team	Apps	(Gls)
1974–1977	Brown Bears		

Senior career*
Years	Team	Apps	(Gls)
1978	Philadelphia Fury	10	(1)
1979–1980	Columbus Magic		
1979–1980	Cleveland Force (indoor)	29	(4)
1980–1981	Chicago Horizon (indoor)	21	(2)
1981–1982	Kansas City Comets (indoor)	5	(0)
1982	Detroit Express		
- * Club domestic league appearances and goals

Ray Schnettgoecke is a retired U.S. professional soccer player who spent one season in the North American Soccer League, one in the Major Indoor Soccer League and at least three in the American Soccer League. He is currently a sales and services executive at Xerox.

Schnettgoecke grew up in St. Louis where he graduated from McBride High School. He then attended Brown University. He played on the Brown soccer team from 1974 to 1977, earning first team All Ivy League in 1976 and 1977. He began his professional career in 1978 with the Philadelphia Fury in the North American Soccer League. He then moved to the Columbus Magic of the American Soccer League for the 1979 and 1980 seasons. In the fall of 1979, he signed with the Cleveland Force of the Major Indoor Soccer League. He moved to the Chicago Horizon for the 1980–1981 season and the Kansas City Comets for the 1981–1982 season. In 1982, he played for the Detroit Express.

After retiring from playing professionally, he continued to play at the amateur level. In 1988, he was on the backline for the Budweiser-30 team from St. Louis which won the USSF Over-30 national championship.
