= Kevin Handlan =

American soccer player

Personal information
- Date of birth: July 10, 1955 (age 71)
- Place of birth: St. Louis, Missouri, U.S.
- Positions: Defender; midfielder

College career
Years	Team	Apps	(Gls)
1973–1976	Saint Louis Billikens		

Senior career*
Years	Team	Apps	(Gls)
1975	St. Louis Kutis		
1978	San Jose Earthquakes	2	(0)
1978	Tulsa Roughnecks	2	(0)
1979	Los Angeles Skyhawks		
1979–1980	St. Louis Steamers (indoor)	14	(0)
1980–1981	Chicago Horizon (indoor)	29	(13)
1981–1985	Kansas City Comets (indoor)	129	(15)
- * Club domestic league appearances and goals

Kevin Handlan is an American retired soccer defender who played professionally in the North American Soccer League and Major Indoor Soccer League. He currently works for the McInnis Group.

== Youth ==
In 1973, Handlan graduated from Kirkwood High School where he was a four-year varsity soccer player. He is a member of the Kirkwood School District Athletic Hall of Fame. He attended St. Louis University, playing on the men's soccer team from 1973 to 1976. In 1973, the team won the NCAA Men's Division I Soccer Championship. In 1975, Handlan played for the St. Louis Kutis team which went to the semifinals of the National Challenge Cup.

== Professional ==
In 1978, Handlan played two games each for both the Tulsa Roughnecks and the San Jose Earthquakes of the North American Soccer League. He moved to the Los Angeles Skyhawks of the American Soccer League for the 1979 season. In the fall of 1979, Handlan signed with the St. Louis Steamers of the Major Indoor Soccer League. He played one season with the Steamers, one with the Chicago Horizon and four with the Kansas City Comets.
