= Jim Schwab =

American soccer player

Personal information
- Date of birth: July 13, 1965 (age 61)
- Place of birth: St. Louis, Missouri, United States
- Height: 6 ft 0 in (1.83 m)
- Position: Defender

Youth career
- 1983–1984: STLCC-Florissant Valley

Senior career*
Years	Team	Apps	(Gls)
1985–1988	Kansas City Comets (indoor)	63	(3)
1988–1989	Hershey Impact (indoor)		
1990–1991	Kansas City Comets (indoor)	52	(12)
1991–1998	Kansas City Attack (indoor)	236	(103)
2000–2001	Kansas City Brass		

Managerial career
- 1990–1999: Johnson County Community College (men)
- 1996–2000: Kansas City Attack
- 1999–: Johnson County Community College (women)
- 2000–2001: Kansas City Brass
- * Club domestic league appearances and goals

Jim Schwab is a retired American soccer defender who played professionally in the Major Indoor Soccer League and National Professional Soccer League. He coached the Kansas City Attack to the 1997 NPSL championship and has coached the Johnson County Community College soccer teams since 1990.

== Player ==
Schwab attended Florissant Valley Community College, playing on the men's soccer team in 1983 and 1984. In 1985, the Kansas City Comets selected Schwab in the third round of the Major Indoor Soccer League draft. He played three seasons with the Comets. In 1988, he moved to the Hershey Impact of the National Professional Soccer League for one season. He returned to the Comets in 1991. The team folded in 1992 and Schwab joined the Kansas City Attack of the NSPL. In 1996, he became a player-coach for the Attack and led them to the league title. He retired as a player in 1998.

== Coach ==
In 1990, Johnson County Community College hired Schwab to coach its men's soccer team. Over ten seasons, he compiled a 156–45–6 record. In 1999, he became the head coach of the women's soccer team as well. He also coached at the professional level when hired as a player coach by the Kansas City Attack in 1996. He coached the Attack for four seasons, winning the 1996–97 National Professional Soccer League championship. In 2000, Schwab became a player-coach with the Kansas City Brass of the fourth division Premier Development League.
