= Hundert =

Hundert is a surname. Notable people with the surname include:

- Edward M. Hundert, American academic
- Gershon Hundert (1946–2023), Canadian historian of early modern Polish Jewry
- Joachim Hundert (1920–1944), German Wehrmacht officer

== See also ==
- Hundert (card game)
- Hundelt
