= Kansas City Brass =

- Full name: Kansas City Brass
- Nickname: The Brass
- Founded: 1997
- Dissolved: 2013
- Ground: Overland Park Soccer Complex; Overland Park, Kansas
- Capacity: 3,000
- Owners: Alan Blinzler, Emilio John
- Head Coach: Lincoln Roblee
- League: USL Premier Development League
- 2013: 4th, Heartland; Playoffs: DNQ
Home colors	Away colors

Kansas City Brass was an American soccer team based in Overland Park, Kansas, United States, a suburb of Kansas City, Missouri. Founded in 1997, the team played in the USL Premier Development League (PDL), the fourth tier of the American Soccer Pyramid, in the Heartland Division of the Central Conference.

The team played its home games on the Stadium Field at the Overland Park Soccer Complex, where they played beginning in 2011. The team's colors were blue and white.

== History ==
The Kansas City Brass was created to bridge the gap between youth, collegiate, and professional soccer in the Kansas City area.

Kansas City Brass was owned by Kansas City United Soccer, Inc., a Kansas Non-Profit Origination, formed in 1997 by Dr. Emilio John and Alan Blinzler, to serve two missions: to prepare graduating high school seniors for college soccer by introducing them to the level of speed and physical play found at the highest levels of college soccer; and to prepare players for the level of competition found at the First and Second Division levels of professional soccer. Since its beginning John served as President of the Brass and Blinzler acted as Chief Operating Officer.

The Brass assisted over thirty players in their quest to move from the amateur ranks to professional teams. In 2007 the Brass was inducted into the United Soccer Leagues Hall of Fame.

== Year-by-year ==
Year	Division	League	Regular season	Playoffs	Open Cup
1998	4	USISL PDSL	4th, Central	Division Finals	1st Round
1999	4	USL PDL	5th, Heartland	Did not qualify	Did not qualify
2000	4	USL PDL	4th, Rocky Mountain	Did not qualify	Did not qualify
2001	4	USL PDL	5th, Rocky Mountain	Did not qualify	Did not qualify
2002	4	USL PDL	5th, Heartland	Did not qualify	Did not qualify
2003	4	USL PDL	5th, Heartland	Did not qualify	Did not qualify
2004	4	USL PDL	6th, Heartland	Did not qualify	Did not qualify
2005	4	USL PDL	3rd, Heartland	Did not qualify	Did not qualify
2006	4	USL PDL	3rd, Heartland	Did not qualify	Did not qualify
2007	4	USL PDL	3rd, Heartland	Did not qualify	1st Round
2008	4	USL PDL	5th, Heartland	Did not qualify	Did not qualify
2009	4	USL PDL	6th, Heartland	Did not qualify	Did not qualify
2010	4	USL PDL	7th, Heartland	Did not qualify	Did not qualify
2011	4	USL PDL	4th, Heartland	Did not qualify	Did not qualify
2012	4	USL PDL	5th, Heartland	Did not qualify	Did not qualify
2013	4	USL PDL	4th, Heartland	Did not qualify	Did not qualify

== Head coaches ==
- (United States) Robi Goff (1998–1999)
- (United States) Jim Schwab (2000–2001)
- (United States) Jefferson Roblee (2002–2010)
- (United States) Burke Slusher (2002–2013) – associate head coach
- (United States) Lincoln Roblee (2011–2013)

== Stadiums ==
Sources:

- Greene Stadium; Liberty, Missouri (2003–2010)
- Liberty High School; Liberty, Missouri 2 games (2003)
- Blue Valley District Activity Center; Overland Park, Kansas 2 games (2003)
- Excelsior Springs High School; Excelsior Springs, Missouri 3 games (2005–2006)
- Overland Park Soccer Complex; Overland Park, Kansas (2011–2013)

== Average attendance ==
Sources:

- 1998: 326 (15th in PDSL)
- 1999: 233 (20th in PDL)
- 2000: 217 (19th in PDL)
- 2001: 160 (28th in PDL)
- 2002: 147 (32nd in PDL)
- 2003: 152 (39th in PDL)
- 2004: 114 (50th in PDL)
- 2005: 114 (48th in PDL)
- 2006: 141 (52nd in PDL)
- 2007: 202 (48th in PDL)
- 2008: 122 (61st in PDL)
- 2009: 134 (58th in PDL)
- 2010: 258 (35th in PDL)
- 2011: 228 (38th in PDL)
- 2012: 340 (29th in PDL)
- 2013: 188 (40th in PDL)
