= Emilio Romero =

Emilio Romero is the name of

- Emilio Romero (writer) (Emilio Romero Gómez; 1917–2003), Spanish writer and journalist
- Emilio Romero (javelin thrower) (fl. 1950), Puerto Rican javelin thrower
- Emilio Romero (sprinter) (born 1937), Venezuelan sprinter
- Emilio Romero (soccer) (born 1954), American soccer player
