= Hundelt =

Hundelt is a surname. Notable people with the surname include:

- Chris Hundelt (born 1963), American soccer player
- Kevin Hundelt (born 1967), American soccer player and coach

== See also ==
- Hundert
