= Gary Amlong =

American soccer player

Personal information
- Date of birth: August 14, 1962 (age 64)
- Place of birth: St. Louis, Missouri, U.S.
- Positions: Midfielder; forward

Youth career
- STLCC-Florissant Valley

Senior career*
Years	Team	Apps	(Gls)
1982–1984	Kansas City Comets (indoor)	66	(9)
1984–1987	Louisville Thunder (indoor)		
- Busch SC
- * Club domestic league appearances and goals

Gary Amlong (born August 14, 1962) is an American retired soccer player who spent two seasons in the Major Indoor Soccer League and several in the American Indoor Soccer Association.

Amlong was a 1981 NJCAA First Team All American soccer player at STLCC-Florissant Valley. In 1982, Amlong signed with the Kansas City Comets of the Major Indoor Soccer League. He played two seasons with the Comets before moving to the Louisville Thunder of the American Indoor Soccer Association. In 1988, he was a member of the Busch SC team which won the National Challenge Cup.
