= Jim Gorsek =

American soccer player

Personal information
- Full name: James Gorsek
- Date of birth: October 12, 1955 (age 71)
- Place of birth: Portland, Oregon, U.S.
- Height: 6 ft 0 in (1.83 m)
- Position: Goalkeeper

Senior career*
Years	Team	Apps	(Gls)
1977–1980	Portland Timbers	16	(0)
1981, 1983–1984	San Diego Sockers	23	(0)
1984–1988	San Diego Sockers (MISL)	108	(0)
1988–1989	Los Angeles Lazers (MISL)	20	(0)
1989–1991	Kansas City Comets (MISL)	49	(0)
1991–1992	St. Louis Storm (MISL)	30	(0)
1993–1994	Portland Pride (CISL)		

International career
1985	United States	2	(0)
- * Club domestic league appearances and goals

James Gorsek (born October 12, 1955) is an American former soccer goalkeeper. He spent seven seasons in the North American Soccer League, seven seasons in the Major Indoor Soccer League and two in the Continental Indoor Soccer League. He also earned two caps with the U.S. national team in 1985.

== Professional ==
Gorsek signed with the Portland Timbers of the North American Soccer League in 1977 as a striker replacement player. He played three games that season, none in 1978 and only one in 1979. In 1980, he saw time in twelve games, but was traded to the San Diego Sockers. In 1981, he played two games, but is not listed on the team's roster for 1982. In 1983, he played in six games, but during the 1983-1984 NASL Indoor season, Gorsek was the league's leading goalie as the Sockers won the title. He then played fifteen games during the 1984 outdoor season. The NASL folded at the end of the 1984 season and the Sockers jumped to the Major Indoor Soccer League. Gorsek played the next four MISL seasons with the Sockers as the team won three MISL championships. In 1988, he joined the Los Angeles Lazers for the 1988-1989 MISL season, but the team folded at the end of the season. Gorsek was then selected by the Kansas City Comets in the LA dispersal draft along with Doug Neely. Gorsek played for Kansas City from 1989 until the team folded in July 1991. He was then with the St. Louis Storm for the 1991–1992 season. In 1993, Gorsek returned to Portland to play two seasons with the Portland Pride of the Continental Indoor Soccer League (CISL).

== National team ==
Gorsek earned his first cap with the U.S. national team as a substitute for Arnie Mausser in a 0–2 loss to Canada on April 2, 1985, in Vancouver. His second cap came two days later as the U.S. tied Canada 1–1 in Portland. In this game, Gorsek started and Mausser replaced him at halftime.

== Honors ==
NASL Indoor Goalkeeper of the Year 1983-1984
