= Schiraldi =

Schiraldi is an Italian surname. People with the surname include:

- Calvin Schiraldi (born 1962), American baseball player
- Gino Schiraldi (born 1958), Canadian soccer player
- Joe Schiraldi (born 1951), Canadian soccer player
- Vincent Schiraldi, American juvenile justice
