= Cabrini University =

Catholic university in Radnor Township, Pennsylvania, U.S.

- Former name: Cabrini College (1957–2016)
- Type: Private university
- Active: 1957–2024
- Religious affiliation: Catholic (Missionary Sisters of the Sacred Heart of Jesus)
- Academic affiliations: ACCU; CIC; CUMU; NAICU
- Location: Radnor, Pennsylvania, United States; 40°03′18″N 75°22′26″W
- Campus: 112 acres (45 ha); Suburban
- Colors: Blue and white
- Nickname: Cavaliers
- Sporting affiliations: NCAA Division III – Atlantic East
- Mascot: Cavalier
- Website: www.cabrini.edu

Cabrini University was a private Catholic university in Radnor Township, Pennsylvania. It was founded by the Missionary Sisters of the Sacred Heart of Jesus in 1957 and was named after the first American naturalized citizen saint, Mother Frances Cabrini. Its core curriculum centered on social justice and it was one of the first universities in the United States to make community service a graduation requirement for all undergraduates. Due to ongoing financial challenges, the university closed at the end of the 2023–24 academic year and ownership of the university's campus passed to Villanova University.

== History ==
=== Pre-history ===
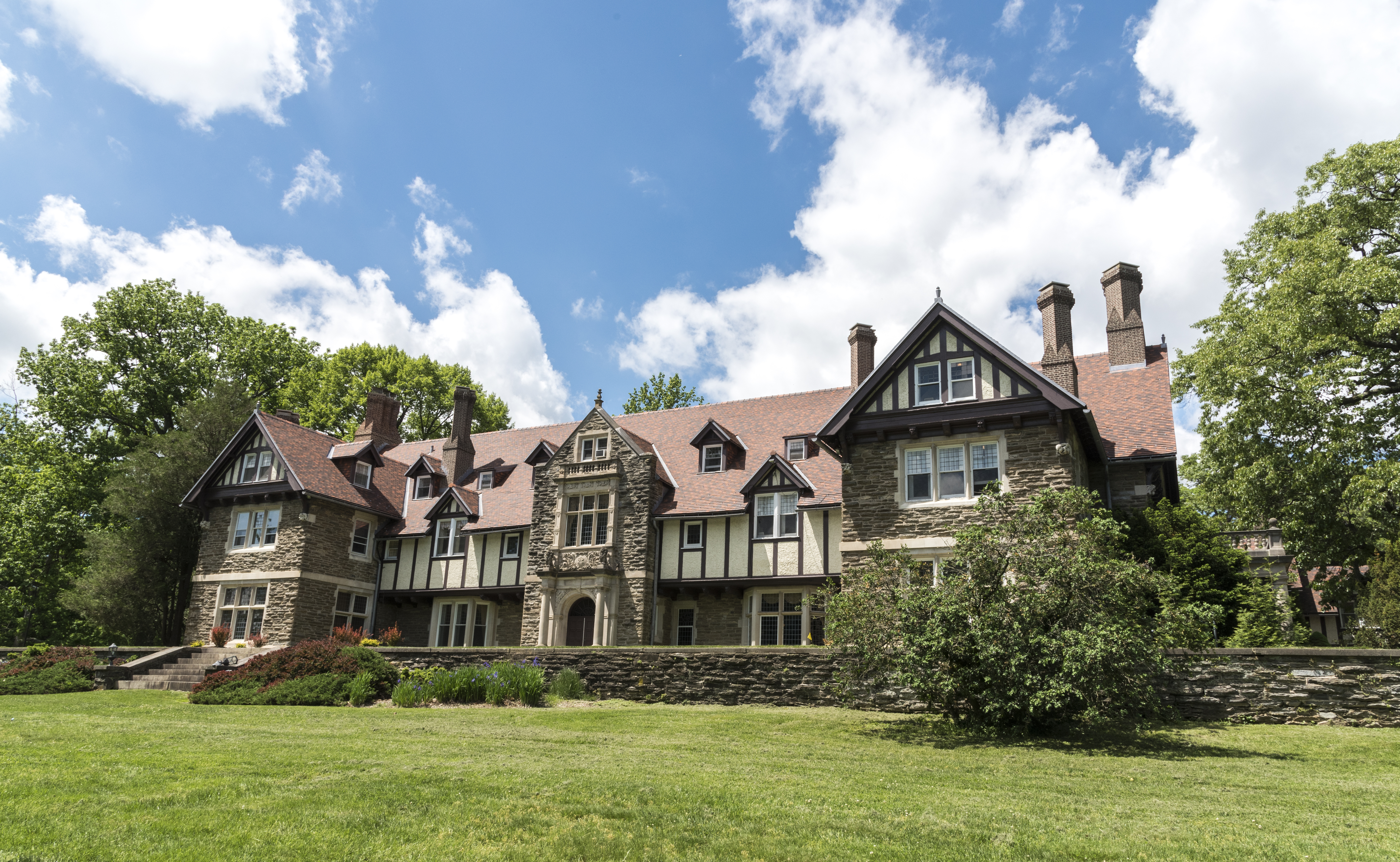
Cabrini University Mansion

The property, originally named Woodcrest, was the estate of James W. Paul, managing partner for Drexel & Company Banking (now JP Morgan Chase) and a member of the wealthy Drexel family from Philadelphia. In 1926 the property was purchased by PhD chemist, gourmet chef, and business titan John Dorrance, inventor of the process for making condensed soup and president of the Campbell's. In 1953, the property was purchased by the Missionary Sisters of the Sacred Heart of Jesus (MSC) and renamed "Villa Cabrini" after the organization's namesake, Saint Frances Xavier Cabrini. At first, Villa Cabrini was used as an orphanage, convent, and cloister.

=== Founding and growth ===
In 1957, Sister Ursula Infante established a school in the villa. Upon opening, it was a female-only school of only thirty-seven students. The orphanage was still a part of the community and they shared the use of the buildings.

The first graduating class was in 1961. Also around this same time period, Cabrini was awarded full accreditation by the Middle States Association.

In the 1950s, Cabrini was only made up of a few buildings. The mansion of the college was the central point of the college, housing the students, providing a cafeteria, classrooms, library, and a chapel. In 1958, they converted the stable house, now known as Grace Hall, to include both classrooms and dormitories.

In 1960, Cabrini finished construction on the Sacred Heart Hall (later known as Founder's Hall), which was a library, cafeteria, gymnasium, and even held science laboratories. The 1960s also saw the construction of a chapel in 1961 and a library in 1965.

=== Late 20th century ===
The early 1970s were a time of much change for the college. After Infante's ten-year presidency in 1967, three presidents were to follow in only three years. Barbara Leonardo was president from 1967 to 1968. During her time at the college, she was also a dean and taught history. In 1968, Gervase Lapadula became president, but soon had to resign due to health problems.

During the late 1960s and early 1970s, the college was starting to change from a women-only to a co-educational establishment and by the early 1980s, the college was completely coeducational. Through a program with Eastern University, located next to the college, men started to attend classes at Cabrini. In turn, Cabrini students were offered more courses through both expansion and external courses at Eastern.

In the 1980s, political science, social work, and computer science programs were added and Xavier Hall, a 124-student residence hall, was built. The faculty voted to make community service a requirement for all students; and Cabrini was recognized as one of the first colleges in the country, and the first in Pennsylvania, to integrate community service into its core curriculum.

In the 1990s and 2000s, undergraduate enrollment increased from 732 to 1,700 and the number of resident students tripled. New and renovated buildings in this time included the Dixon Center, Founder's Hall, and the Center for Science, Education, and Technology (later named the Antoinette Iadarola Center for Science, Education, and Technology).

=== 21st century and closure ===
Cabrini College garnered national attention when, in the midst of a national economic recession, it announced a tuition reduction of nearly 13%.

Don Taylor became Cabrini College's first male president on July 1, 2014. During his inaugural address on October 25, 2014, Taylor introduced the Cabrini 2020 Roadmap to Growth. This plan attempted to measure the college's progress and made promises that were to have occurred by 2020. The initiative promised to have 100 percent of undergraduate students participating in a Living & Learning Community, pledged that all undergraduate students would experience two or more high-impact educational practices in their first year, and committed to ensuring that all students encountered at least four high-impact educational practices before graduation.

Under Taylor's leadership, Cabrini College changed its name to Cabrini University on July 1, 2016.

In 2022, The Philadelphia Inquirer reported that the university faced a debt of approximately $5 million with a total budget of $45 million. Enrollment had dropped to about 1,500 students from 2,360 in the 2016–2017 academic year. In response to these challenges, the university had repeatedly eliminated staff and restructured; for example, it eliminated the position of provost, reduced the number of colleges from three to two, and laid off several tenured and tenure track faculty.

In a joint statement with Villanova University published on June 23, 2023, Cabrini announced it would cease operations at the conclusion of the 2023–24 academic year.

Its final commencement was held on May 19, 2024, at which Kylie Kelce, a 2017 graduate of the university and wife of retired Philadelphia Eagles football player Jason Kelce, gave the commencement address.

Villanova University officially assumed ownership of Cabrini's campus on June 28, 2024.

=== Presidents ===
- Ursula Infante (1957–1967)
- Barbara Leonardo (1967–1968)
- Gervase Lapadula (1968)
- Regina Casey (1969–1972)
- Mary Louise Sullivan (1972–1982)
- Eileen Currie (1982–1992)
- Toni Iadarola (1992–2008) – first lay president
- Marie Angelella George (2008–2013)
- Deb Takes (2013) – interim
- Don Taylor (2014–2022) – first male president
- Helen Drinan (2022–2024) – interim

== Academics ==
Cabrini University offered 40 undergraduate majors, additional minors, and specialized tracks. The institution also offered part-time graduate degrees in accounting, biological sciences, data science, education, and leadership. In 2016, it started two new part-time doctoral programs for working professionals: EdD in Educational Leadership and PhD in Organizational Development.

=== Faculty ===
The university's faculty was 35% full-time and 65% adjuncts, well above the nation's average.

=== Curriculum ===
All undergraduate students participated in the university's core curriculum, Justice Matters, in which, the university asserts, "students learn skills that will advance their careers and that can be used for the benefit of their communities, linking theory to practice in the world, preparing them for professional careers through a rigorous liberal learning experience." The curriculum attempted to raise awareness of social problems, involve students hands-on in social justice issues, to teach students to see themselves as participating in value-driven decision making, and to develop liberally educated persons.

=== Rankings ===
Cabrini was ranked 122nd in the Regional Universities (North) category by U.S. News & World Report for 2018.

== Student life ==
=== Radio Station: WYBF-FM ===
Cabrini University had its own student-run variety radio station.

=== School newspaper: The Loquitur ===
The Loquitur was the student-run newspaper of Cabrini University since 1959. The paper was printed on a monthly basis, featuring on and off campus news, lifestyles, sports and perspective pieces.

=== Woodcrest (magazine/literary journal) ===
Woodcrest served as the literary journal at Cabrini University. The magazine had seen many forms over the decades, and had been online since 2012. Advised by faculty and edited by students from the Department of Writing and Narrative Arts, Woodcrest was a national publication with roots in the literary arts. Faculty advisors have included editors and writers such as Seth Frechie, Amy Persichetti, and Bret Shepard.

== Athletics ==
Cabrini University had 19 varsity teams and various recreational sports clubs. The teams competed in the NCAA Division III, ECAC and the Atlantic East Conference (AEC). Cabrini was known for their men's lacrosse team which won the NCAA Division III National Championship in 2019 against Amherst College at Lincoln Financial Field. Aside from the only national championship in school history, the men's lacrosse team also won 22 consecutive conference titles (20 CSAC and five ECAC).

== Notable alumni ==
- Fredia Gibbs — professional martial artist, kickboxer, and boxer
- DiAnne Gove — Republican member of the New Jersey General Assembly
- Jordan A. Harris — Democratic member of the Pennsylvania House of Representatives
- Kylie Kelce — podcaster and media personality
- Tyheim Monroe — basketball player
- Jamie Santora — Republican member of the Pennsylvania House of Representatives
- Larry Tukis — professional soccer player
- Patrick Zipfel — professional basketball coach and college athletics director
