= Larry Tukis =

American soccer player

Personal information
- Date of birth: October 6, 1964 (age 62)
- Place of birth: Fair Haven, New Jersey, United States
- Position: Goalkeeper

Youth career
- 1982–1985: Cabrini College

Senior career*
Years	Team	Apps	(Gls)
1987–1988	Kansas City Comets (indoor)	1	(0)
1988–1990	Hershey Impact (indoor)		
1991–1992	Harrisburg Heat (indoor)	11	(0)
- * Club domestic league appearances and goals

Larry Tukis (born October 6, 1964) is a retired American soccer goalkeeper who played professionally in the Major Indoor Soccer League and National Professional Soccer League.

Tukis attended Cabrini College where he played on the men's soccer team from 1982 through 1985. He played one game for the Kansas City Comets during the 1987-1988 Major Indoor Soccer League. He then spent two seasons with the Hershey Impact of the American Indoor Soccer Association. On November 18, 1990, the Impact released Tukis to free up a roster spot for newly signed Scoop Stanisic. Tukis also played one season (1991–1992) with the Harrisburg Heat of the National Professional Soccer League.
