= Chris Kenny (soccer) =

American soccer player

Personal information
- Date of birth: May 31, 1962 (age 64)
- Place of birth: St. Louis, Missouri, U.S.
- Position: Defender

Youth career
- 1981: Florissant Valley Community College
- 1982–1983: St. Louis Billikens

Senior career*
Years	Team	Apps	(Gls)
1983–1984	Chicago Sting (indoor)	8	(1)
1984	Chicago Sting	4	(0)
1985–1988	St. Louis Steamers (indoor)	92	(3)
1988–1989	Kansas City Comets (indoor)	46	(5)
- * Club domestic league appearances and goals

Chris Kenny (born May 31, 1962) is an American retired soccer defender who played professionally in the North American Soccer League and Major Indoor Soccer League.

== Youth ==
Kenny graduated from McCluer High School. He attended Florissant Valley Community College where he was a 1981 junior college soccer All American. He then transferred to St. Louis University where he was a 1983 Second Team All American soccer player. He was inducted into the Billikens Athletic Hall of Fame in 1995.

== Professional ==
In October 1983, the Los Angeles Lazers selected Kenny with the second overall pick of the 1983 Major Indoor Soccer League draft. He signed with the Chicago Sting of the North American Soccer League, playing for them during the 1983-1984 NASL indoor season. He then saw time in four games during the 1984 NASL outdoor season as the Sting won the league championship. The team released him in November 1984. He then signed with the St. Louis Steamers where he saw time in seven games during the 1985-1986 MISL season. During the 1988 off season, Kenny moved to the Kansas City Comets.
