= Kansas City Comets (1979–1991) =

Former indoor soccer team in Missouri

Kansas City Comets logo

The Kansas City Comets were a professional indoor soccer team based for most of its existence in Kansas City, Missouri. They played in the original Major Indoor Soccer League (MISL; later the Major Soccer League) from 1979–1991, when they folded. They played most of their home games in Kemper Arena after originally playing in Municipal Auditorium (Kansas City, Missouri).

The team originated as the Detroit Lightning, which joined the MISL as an expansion team in the 1979–1980 season. After a year in Detroit the team relocated to San Francisco, California, becoming the San Francisco Fog. They moved to Kansas City in 1981, where they remained for ten years. In Kansas City, the team went to the league playoffs seven times, advancing to the division finals three times.

== History ==
In 1979 the Major Indoor Soccer League placed an expansion franchise in Detroit, Michigan. The team, then known as the Detroit Lightning, failed to make the playoffs, and at the end of the season were purchased by entrepreneur David Schoenstadt, later the founder of Discovery Zone. Schoenstadt relocated the team to San Francisco, California, where they were renamed the San Francisco Fog. They again failed to make the playoffs in the 1980–1981 season, and Schoenstadt moved the team once more, this time to Kansas City, Missouri, rebranding them the Kansas City Comets.

The Comets failed to qualify for the playoffs in the 1981–1982 season, but were thereafter consistent playoff contenders, making a total of seven playoff appearances in ten seasons. They advanced to the quarterfinals in 1985, the division semifinals in 1987, and the division finals in 1988, 1990, and 1991. They had enjoyed a strong attendance in their early years, but ticket sales declined later in their run, dropping from an average high of 15,786 in the 1983–1984 season to a low of 7,103 in the 1990–1991 season. Though they finished second in the league in their last two seasons of operations, the Comets could not withstand the drop in revenue, and folded at the end of the 1990–1991 season.

The Comets were followed the next season by the Kansas City Attack of the National Professional Soccer League; this team was known as the "Kansas City Comets" from 2001–2005. In 2010 the Missouri Comets, based in nearby Independence, joined the new Major Indoor Soccer League, carrying on the legacy of the original Comets.

Stars and fan favorites included Enzo Di Pede, Billy Gazonas, Gino Schiraldi, Greg Makowski, Victor Petroni, Jan Goossens, Damir Haramina, Kia, Dale Mitchell, Alan Mayer, Zoran Savic, Jim Schwab, Gordon Hill, Tasso Koutsoukos, Manny Schwartz, David Doyle, Barry Wallace, Tim Clark, Elson Seale, Yilmaz Orhan, and Ty Keough as well as coaches Pat McBride and Rick Benben.

=== Ownership ===
- Dr. David Schoenstadt (1979–87)
- Kansas City Comets, Inc. (1987–91)

== Staff ==
- Dick Berg General manager
- Peter Simon Public Relations Director
- Brad Jacobs Marketing Director
- Tim Leiweke – General Manager (1981–84) President (1986–88)

== Coaching staff ==
=== Head coaches ===
- (United States) Terry Fisher (1979–80)
- (United States) Johnny Moore (1980–81)
- (United States) Luis Dabo (1981) 2 Wins 7 Losses
- (United States) Pat McBride (1981–84) 63 Wins 80 Losses (Postseason: 2 Wins 5 Losses/No Series Wins, 2 Series Losses)
- (United States) Rick Benben (1984–87) 47 Wins 57 Losses (Postseason: 2 Wins 3 Losses/1 Series Win, 1 Series Loss)
- (Socialist Federal Republic of Yugoslavia) Niki Nikolic (1987-Interim) 1 Win 3 Losses
- (Northern Ireland) Dave Clements (1987–91) 124 Wins 111 Losses (Postseason: 18 wins 16 Losses/3 Series Wins, 4 Series Losses)

=== Assistants ===
- (United States) Johnny Moore (1981)
- (United States) Tony Simoes (1981–82)
- (United States) Rick Benben (1982–84)
- (United States) Billy Gazonas (1984–86)
- (Socialist Federal Republic of Yugoslavia) Niki Nikolic (1986–87)
- (Scotland) Tony Glavin (1988–89)

== Year-by-year ==
=== Detroit Lightning ===
| Year | League | Record | Reg. season | Playoffs | Avg. attendance |
|---|---|---|---|---|---|
| 1979–80 | MISL | 15–17 | 3rd Central Division | 1st Round | 3,520 |

=== San Francisco Fog ===
| Year | League | Record | Reg. season | Playoffs | Avg. attendance |
|---|---|---|---|---|---|
| 1980–81 | MISL | 11–29 | 4th West | Opted out of playoffs | 4,588 |

=== Kansas City Comets ===
| Year | Division | League | Reg. season | Playoffs | Avg. attendance |
|---|---|---|---|---|---|
| 1981–82 | Western | MISL | 6th | out of playoffs | 11,058 |
| 1982–83 | Western | MISL | 3rd | 1st Round | 14,692 |
| 1983–84 | Western | MISL | 4th | 1st Round | 15,786 |
| 1984–85 | Western | MISL | 4th | Quarterfinals | 12,917 |
| 1985–86 | Western | MISL | 5th | out of playoffs | 12,428 |
| 1986–87 | Western | MISL | 2nd | Division Semifinals | 12,447 |
| 1987–88 | Western | MISL | 3rd | Division Finals | 11,211 |
| 1988–89 | N/A | MISL | 7th | out of playoffs | 9,228 |
| 1989–90 | Eastern | MISL | 2nd | Division Finals | 10,475 |
| 1990–91 | Eastern | MSL | 2nd | Division Finals | 7,103 |

== Honors ==
Rookie of the Year

- 1986: Dave Boncek
- 1988: David Doyle

Coach of the Year

- 1983: Pat McBride
- 1987: Dave Clements

== Players ==
=== San Francisco Fog Roster ===
Note: Flags indicate national team as defined under FIFA eligibility rules; some limited exceptions apply. Players may hold more than one non-FIFA nationality.

| No. | Pos. | Nation | Player |
|---|---|---|---|
| 1 | GK | USA | Roy Messing |
| 2 | DF | USA | Buzz Demling |
| 3 | DF | USA | Lee Atack |
| 4 | DF | USA | Mark Demling |
| 5 | DF | | Andy Stanton |
| 6 | FW | USA | Mani Hernandez |
| 7 | FW | USA | Art Welch |
| 8 | FW | USA | Johnny Moore |
| 9 | FW | USA | Geoff Davies |
| 10 | FW | ENG | Jimmy Rolland |
| 11 | FW | USA | John Smillie |
| 12 | MF | NGR | Andy Atuegbu |

| No. | Pos. | Nation | Player |
|---|---|---|---|
| 13 | MF | SCO | Davie Kemp |
| 14 | DF | ENG | Brian Joy |
| 15 | DF | USA | Len Salvemini |
| 16 | FW | ENG | John Brooks |
| 17 | MF | ENG | Mike Mancini |
| 18 | DF | USA | Dirk Denkers |
| 19 | DF | ENG | Len Renery |
| 20 | GK | USA | Tom Reynolds |
| — | FW | ESP | Manny Cuenca |
| — | DF | USA | Greg Delgado |
| — | FW | USA | Doug Wark |
| — | FW | ENG | Alan Sproates |

=== Kansas City Comets ===
- (Chile) Marco Antonio Abascal (1981–82) 7 Apps 1 Goal 0 Assists
- (England) Laurie Abrahams (1985–86) 55 Apps 38 Goals 35 Assists
- (United States) Tom Alioto (1982–1984) 26 Apps 1 Goal 6 Assists
- (United States) Gary Amlong (1981–1983) 68 Apps 9 Goals 15 Assists
- (United States) Ed Anibal (1989–90) 38 Apps 0 Goals 0 Assists
- (United States) Chad Ashton (1990–91) 44 Apps 9 Goals 11 Assists
- (Scotland) John Bain (1986–87) 43 Apps 26 Goals 27 Assists
- (Canada) Mike Bakic (1981–82) 20 Apps 10 Goals 4 Assists
- (United States) (Socialist Federal Republic of Yugoslavia) Boris Bandov (1983–1985) 34 Apps 1 Goal 6 Assists
- (United States) (Socialist Federal Republic of Yugoslavia) Nebo Bandovic (1989–90) 5 Apps 0 Goals 0 Assists
- (Socialist Federal Republic of Yugoslavia) Petar Baralic (1984–85) 17 Apps 5 Goals 6 Assists
- (Honduras) Porfirio Armando Betancourt (1987–88) 48 Apps 5 Goals 8 Assists
- (United States) David Boncek (1985–1990) 230 Apps 36 Goals 21 Assists
- (United States) Barney Boyce (1981–82) 3 Apps 0 Goals 0 Assists
- (United States) Bob Bozada (1982–83) 22 Apps 1 Goal 1 Assist
- (United States) David Brcic (1989) GK-16 Apps 8 wins 8 losses
- (United States) Cliff Brown (1983–84) GK-4 Apps 1 Win 2 Losses
- (Denmark) Jens Busk (1986–87) 13 Apps 1 Goal 4 Assists
- (England) David Butler (1981–82) 15 Apps 8 Goals 5 Assists
- (Argentina) Cacho (1986–1988) 40 Apps 10 Goals 8 Assists
- (Canada) Charlie Carey (1982–83; 1984–85) 92 Apps 36 Goals 19 Assists
- (Haiti) Gerald "Magic" Celestin (1981–82) 12 Apps 2 Goals 1 Assist
- (Socialist Federal Republic of Yugoslavia) John Cerin (1985) 3 Apps 1 Goal 0 Assists
- (Turkey) Engin Cinar (1981–82) 1 App 0 Goals 0 Assists
- (United States) Tim Clark (1982–1987) 191 Apps 20 Goals 38 Assists
- (England) Gary Collier (1987) 25 Apps 0 Goals 1 Assist
- (Italy) Graziano Cornolo (1983–84) 26 Apps 5 Goals 3 Assists
- (England) Stan Cummins (1988–89) 48 Apps 6 Goals 15 Assists
- (Brazil) Val DeSouza (1981–82) 48 Apps 12 Goals 8 Assists
- (United States) (Argentina) Angelo DiBernardo (1985–86) 48 Apps 22 Goals 17 Assists
- (Socialist Federal Republic of Yugoslavia) Zoran Dimitrijević (1986) 8 Apps 0 Goals 0 Assists
- (Canada) Enzo Di Pede (1981–1986) GK-114 Apps 39 Wins 65 Losses
- (Germany) John Dolinsky (1981–82) 20 Apps 4 Goals 5 Assists
- (England) Mike Dowler (1989–1991) GK 57 Apps 29 Wins 26 Losses
- (Republic of Ireland) David Doyle (1987–1991) 132 Apps 79 Goals 38 Assists
- (United States) Chris Duke (1989–1991) 71 Apps 2 Goals 2 Assists
- (United States) Ted Eck (1988–1991) 100 Apps 38 Goals 26 Assists
- (Chile) Jorge Espinoza (1986–87) 47 Apps 7 Goals 3 Assists
- (United States) Charlie Fajkus (1984–1987) 120 Apps 57 Goals 49 Assists
- (Brazil) Ivair Ferreira (1981–82) 14 Apps 5 Goals 3 Assists
- (Argentina) Miguel Filardo (1981–82) 7 Apps 2 Goals 0 Assists
- (United States) Joe Filla (1981–1983) 40 Apps 3 Goals 6 Assists
- (Canada) (Scotland) Iain Fraser (1986–91) 206 Apps 19 Goals 31 Assists
- (United States) Mark Frederickson (1981–1985) 153 Apps 38 Goals 33 Assists
- (United States) Keith Fulk (1985–86) 13 Apps 0 Goals 2 Assists
- (England) Keith Furphy (1985–86) 29 Apps 22 Goals 17 Assists
- (United States) Scott Gaither (1990–91) 1 App 0 Goals 0 Assists
- (Argentina) Pedro Gano (1981–82) 7 Apps 0 Goals 0 Assists
- (United States) Billy Gazonas (1982–1984) 55 Apps 9 Goals 13 Assists
- (England) George Gibbs (1981–82) 7 Apps 0 Goals 2 Assists
- (United States) Ed Gettemeier (1986–1989) GK-51 Apps 21 Wins 31 Losses
- (Scotland) Tony Glavin (1988–89; 1990–91) 29 Apps 4 Goals 4 Assists
- (Netherlands) Jan Goossens (1986–1991) 227 Apps 221 Goals 237 Assists
- (United States) Jim Gorsek (1989–1991) GK-48 Apps 27 Wins 19 Losses
- (Scotland) Gerry Gray (1989–90) 12 Apps 3 Goals 6 Assists
- (Canada) Warren Green (1981–82) 1 App 0 Goals 0 Assists
- (United States) Charley Greene (1986–1988) 93 Apps 21 Goals 20 Assists
- (England) Clive Griffiths (1981–1985) 112 Apps 2 Goals 20 Assists
- (Iceland) Albert Guðmundsson (1982–83) 11 Apps 1 Goal 1 Assist
- (Trinidad and Tobago) Winston Hackett (1981–82) 8 Apps 2 Goals 2 Assists
- (United States) Kevin Handlan (1981–1985) 129 Apps 15 Goals 17 Assists
- (Socialist Federal Republic of Yugoslavia) (United States) Damir Haramina (1985–1989) 143 Apps 111 Goals 65 Assists
- (United States) John Hayes (1983–84) 41 Apps 12 Goals 12 Assists
- (England) Gordon Hill (1983–84) 49 Apps 50 Goals 28 Assists
- (United States) Austin Hudson (1981–82) 2 Apps 0 Goals 0 Assists
- (United States) Chris Hundelt (1987–88) 20 Apps 3 Goals 4 Assists
- (United States) Kevin Hundelt (1988–1991) 143 Apps 43 Goals 30 Assists
- (Canada) Greg Ion (1988–1990) 99 Apps 48 Goals 33 Assists
- (Nigeria) Emilio John (1981–82) 7 Apps 2 Goals 0 Assists
- (Cameroon) Michel Kaham (1986) 7 Apps 0 Goals 1 Assist
- (United States) Tom Kain (1986–1991) 129 Apps 12 Goals 14 Assists
- (United States) Chris Kenny (1988–89) 46 Apps 4 Goals 5 Assists
- (United States) Ty Keough (1985–86) 41 Apps 2 Goals 1 Assist
- (United States) John Klein (1990–91) 34 Apps 4 Goals 10 Assists
- (Canada) Tasso Koutsoukos (1983–86, 1987–88) 180 Apps 98 Goals 84 Assists
- (United States) Jeff Kraft (1987) 1 App 1 Goal 1 Assist
- (United States) Art Kramer (1981–82) 15 Apps 7 Goals 4 Assists
- (Denmark) Jorgen Kristensen (1986–87) 17 Apps 5 Goals 10 Assists
- (England) Stuart Lee (1982–83; 1985–86) 82 Apps 39 Goals 27 Assists
- (United States) (Socialist Federal Republic of Yugoslavia) Mark Liveric (1984–85) 9 Apps 3 Goals 5 Assists
- (Scotland) Duncan MacEwan (1986–87) 25 Apps 3 Goals 1 Assist
- (United States) Greg Makowski (1982–1985) 136 Apps 65 Goals 83 Assists
- (England) Nick Mangione (1981-1985) 28 Apps 9 Goals 4 Assists
- (Argentina) Patricio Margetic (1986–87) 69 Apps 36 Goals 48 Assists
- (United States) Mark Mathews (1990–91) 14 Apps 1 Goal 0 Assists
- (United States) Arnie Mausser (1985) GK-1 App 1 Win 0 Losses
- (United States) Alan Mayer (1985–1989) GK-116 Apps 56 Wins 55 Losses
- (United States) Billy McKeon (1982–84) 20 Apps 0 Goals 0 Assists
- (Scotland) Doug McLagan (1989–1991) 67 Apps 12 Goals 10 Assists
- (United States) Keith Meyer (1986) 15 Apps 0 Goals 0 Assists
- (Canada) Dale Mitchell (1985–90) 248 Apps 212 Goals 147 Assists
- (Scotland) Johnny Moore (1981) 1 Apps 1 Goal 0 Assists
- (Socialist Federal Republic of Yugoslavia) Louie Nanchoff (1987) 27 Apps 14 Goals 16 Assists
- (United States) Doug Neely (1989–1991) 95 Apps 18 Goals 21 Assists
- (Netherlands) Johan Neeskens (1985–86) 27 Apps 1 Goal 2 Assists
- (Socialist Federal Republic of Yugoslavia) Niki Nikolic (1984) 6 Apps 0 Goals 0 Assists
- (Italy) Pat Occhiuto (1981–82) 15 Apps 0 Goals 1 Assist
- (Nigeria) Damian Ogunsuyi (1981–82) 10 Apps 5 Goals 4 Assists
- (United States) Mike O'Mara (1981) 9 Apps 0 Goals 0 Assists
- (Cyprus) Yilmaz Orhan (1981–1983; 1986) 76 Apps 63 Goals 40 Assists
- (United States) Steve Pecher (1984–85) 54 Apps 6 Goals 16 Assists
- (Canada) Paul Peschisolido (1990–91) 43 Apps 24 Goals 11 Assists
- (Canada) Victor Petroni (1981–83) GK-44 Apps 21 Wins 18 Losses
- (Socialist Federal Republic of Yugoslavia) Iubo Petrovic (1981–82) 25 Apps 15 Goals 18 Assists
- (Nigeria) Ben Popoola (1981–82) 25 Apps 11 Goals 7 Assists
- (Denmark) Frank Rasmussen (1987–88) 21 Apps 1 Goal 5 Assists
- (Brazil) Claudio Rocha (1981–82) 9 Apps 3 Goals 2 Assists
- (Denmark) Kim Roentved (1987–1991) 158 Apps 57 Goals 82 Assists
- (United States) Emilio Romero (1981–82) 17 Apps 5 Goals 5 Assists
- (England) Owen Rose (1981–82) 11 Apps 0 Goals 1 Assist
- (Socialist Federal Republic of Yugoslavia) Edmond Rugova (1986–87) 14 Apps 1 Goal 1 Assist
- (Argentina) Carlos Salguero (1981–82; 1984–86) 86 Apps 38 Goals 30 Assists (Deceased)
- (United States) Len Salvemini (1981–82) 42 Apps 6 Goals 15 Assists
- (United States) Dave Sarachan (1981–82) 11 Apps 3 Goals 0 Assists
- (Socialist Federal Republic of Yugoslavia) Zoran Savic (1981–1884) 110 Apps 70 Goals 44 Assists
- (Canada) Gino Schiraldi (1981–1991) 389 Apps 75 Goals 82 Assists
- (United States) Larry Schmidgall (1981–82) 16 Apps 3 Goals 1 Assist
- (United States) Ray Schnettgoecke (1981–82) 5 Apps 0 Goals 0 Assists
- (United States) Jim Schwab (1985–1988; 1990–91) 116 Apps 15 Goals 20 Assists
- (Israel) Manny Schwartz (1983–1986) GK-54 Apps 24 Wins 31 Losses
- (United States) Elson Seale (1982–1985) 117 Apps 56 Goals 40 Assists
- (Brazil) Silvio (1981–82) 3 Apps 0 Goals 2 Assists
- (United States) Tony Simoes (1981–82) 3 Apps 0 Goals 0 Assists
- (United States) Rick Snyder (1990–91) 15 Apps 0 Goals 1 Assist
- (United States) Craig Stahl (1981–1984) 36 Apps 10 Goals 5 Assists
- (United States) Shane Steadman (1988–89) 3 Apps 1 Goal 0 Assists
- (United States) John Stremlau (1983–84) 39 Apps 9 Goals 9 Assists
- (Israel) Benny Tabak (1984–85) 44 Apps 18 Goals 16 Assists
- (United States) Jim Tietjens (1983–84) GK-7 Apps 2 Wins 4 Losses
- (United States) Larry Tukis (1988) GK-1 App 0 Wins 1 Loss
- (United States) Tim Twellman (1983–1986) 88 Apps 11 Goals 26 Assists
- (United States) Tim Tyma (1981–82) 4 Apps 0 Goals 0 Assists
- (Canada) (England) Carl Valentine (1990–91) 48 Apps 27 Goals 26 Assists
- (United States) Greg Villa (1982–83) 51 Apps 26 Goals 17 Assists
- (England) Barry Wallace (1987–1990) 107 Apps 50 Goals 39 Assists (Deceased)
- (Netherlands) Tonnie Wareman (1987–88) 23 Apps 5 Goals 5 Assists
- (Denmark) Martin Zimmerman (1986) 1 App 0 Goals 0 Assists
- (Socialist Federal Republic of Yugoslavia) Mickey Zivaljevic (1983–84) 1 App 0 Goals 0 Assists
- (Iran) Kia Zolgharnain (1987–90) 104 Apps 66 Goals 37 Assists
