= Tim Clark (soccer) =

American soccer player

Personal information
- Date of birth: June 5, 1959 (age 67)
- Place of birth: St. Louis, Missouri, U.S.
- Position: Defender

Youth career
- 1977–1979: SIUE Cougars

Senior career*
Years	Team	Apps	(Gls)
1980–1981	Minnesota Kicks	8	(0)
1980–1981	Minnesota Kicks (indoor)	16	(1)
1981–1982	Philadelphia Fever (indoor)	39	(6)
1982–1987	Kansas City Comets (indoor)	191	(20)
Total		224	(27)
- * Club domestic league appearances and goals

Tim Clark (born June 5, 1959) is an American retired soccer defender who played professionally in the North American Soccer League and the Major Indoor Soccer League.

== Youth ==
Clark played youth soccer with the Busch Soccer Club. He graduated from St. Louis University High School where he was an All State high school soccer player. He then attended Southern Illinois University at Edwardsville, playing on the men's soccer team from 1977 to 1979. His senior season, Clark and his team mates won the NCAA Men's Division I Soccer Championship. Clark was named the Tournament MVP.

== Professional ==
In 1980, Clark turned professional with the Minnesota Kicks of the North American Soccer League. After two seasons with the Kicks, Clark turned to indoor soccer with the Philadelphia Fever of the Major Indoor Soccer League. On June 16, 1982, the Kansas City Comets purchased Clark's contract from the Fever. Clark remained with the Comets until waived on June 3, 1987.
