= Billy Gazonas =

American soccer player and coach

Personal information
- Date of birth: June 8, 1956 (age 70)
- Place of birth: Trenton, New Jersey, United States
- Height: 5 ft 5 in (1.65 m)
- Position: Midfielder

College career
Years	Team	Apps	(Gls)
1973–1977	Hartwick College		

Senior career*
Years	Team	Apps	(Gls)
1978–1980	Tulsa Roughnecks	57	(4)
1979–1980	Tulsa Roughnecks (indoor)	12	(8)
1981	Calgary Boomers	11	(0)
1981–1982	New York Arrows (indoor)	37	(16)
1982–1984	Kansas City Comets (indoor)	54	(9)

Managerial career
- 1984–1986: Kansas City Comets (assistant)
- * Club domestic league appearances and goals

Billy Gazonas (born June 8, 1956) is a former U.S. soccer midfielder who won the 1977 Hermann Trophy as the top collegiate soccer player of the year. He played four seasons in the North American Soccer League and several in Major Indoor Soccer League.

== Player ==
=== Youth ===
Gazonas played soccer on the boys' team at St. Anthony High School in Trenton, New Jersey, and graduated from the school in 1973. In 1999, he was named by The Star-Ledger as one of the top ten New Jersey high school soccer players of the 1970s.

He entered Hartwick College that fall where he played on the men's soccer team. Hartwick had a dominant team during Gazonas four years at the school. His freshman year, Hartwick lost to Howard in the NCAA post-season tournament semifinals. In 1976, Hartwick made it to the semifinals before losing to Indiana. However, his senior year, Hartwick made it to the championship game where it defeated the University of San Francisco 2–1 to take the NCAA title. Gazones was team captain. That year, Gazonas was named as a first team All American and won the Hermann Trophy as the best collegiate player of the year. This gave Hartwick its second consecutive Hermann Trophy winner as Glenn Myernick had won it the year prior. Hartwick University inducted Gazonas into its Athletic Hall of Fame in 1995.

=== Professional ===
The Tulsa Roughnecks of the North American Soccer League selected Gazonas with the first pick in the 1977 NASL college draft. He played three seasons as a creative midfielder for the Roughnecks. After the 1980 season, Gazonas moved to the Calgary Boomers for its one season in the NASL. By the end of the 1981 season, the NASL was beginning to contract and Gazonas, who had played in the NASL indoor seasons, jumped to the New York Arrows of Major Indoor Soccer League. That year the Arrows won the MISL championship. Later played with the Kansas City Comets.

== Coach ==
In December 1985, Gazonas became an assistant coach with the Kansas City Comets of
