= Dave Boncek =

American soccer player

Personal information
- Date of birth: July 21, 1963 (age 63)
- Place of birth: St. Louis, Missouri, U.S.
- Height: 5 ft 10 in (1.78 m)
- Position: Defender

Youth career
- 1981–1984: Indiana Hoosiers

Senior career*
Years	Team	Apps	(Gls)
1985–1990	Kansas City Comets (indoor)	230	(46)
- * Club domestic league appearances and goals

Dave Boncek (born July 21, 1963) is an American former professional indoor soccer player who played as a defender in the Major Indoor Soccer League with the Kansas City Comets. He was the 1986 MISL Rookie of the Year.

In 1981, Boncek graduated from St. Mary's High School. He was inducted into the school's Hall of Fame in 2002. Boncek attended Indiana University, playing on the men's soccer team from 1981 to 1984. In 1982 and 1983, the Hoosiers won the NCAA Division I Men's Soccer Championship.

In June 1985, the Kansas City Comets selected Boncek in the first round (fifth overall) of the Major Indoor Soccer League draft. He was the 1986 MISL Rookie of the Year. Boncek played for the Comets until the team released him in October 1989. On January 3, 1990, Boncek returned to the Comets for the remainder of the 1989–1990 season.
