= Mark Frederickson =

American soccer player

Personal information
- Date of birth: July 15, 1960 (age 66)
- Place of birth: St. Louis, Missouri, U.S.
- Position: Midfielder

Youth career
- 1978–1981: St. Louis Billikens

Senior career*
Years	Team	Apps	(Gls)
1981–1985	Kansas City Comets (indoor)	153	(38)
1985–1987	St. Louis Steamers (indoor)	97	(23)
1987–1989	Los Angeles Lazers (indoor)	116	(14)
1989–1992	St. Louis Storm (indoor)	130	(16)
Total		496	(91)
- * Club domestic league appearances and goals

Mark Frederickson is an American retired soccer player who spent eleven seasons in the Major Indoor Soccer League.

== Youth ==
In 1978, Frederickson graduated from Bishop DuBourg High School where he is a member of the school's Hall of Fame. That year, the Los Angeles Aztecs selected Frederickson in the North American Soccer League draft. Frederickson chose to enter college rather than turn professional. From 1978 to 1981, he played for St. Louis University, earning 1979 Honorable Mention and 1980 Second Team All American honors. In 1995, St. Louis University inducted Frederickson into the Billikens Hall of Fame.

== Professional ==
In 1982, the New York Cosmos picked Frederickson in the first round (thirteenth overall) of the NASL draft. However, by that time, he was already playing for the Kansas City Comets of the Major Indoor Soccer League. In 1985, Frederickson moved to the St. Louis Steamers. On August 13, 1987, the Los Angeles Lazers signed Frederickson who had been waived by the Steamers. In 1989, Frederickson made his last move, this time to the St. Louis Storm where he finished his career in 1992.
