= Craig Stahl =

American soccer player

Personal information
- Full name: Craig A. Stahl
- Date of birth: July 9, 1959 (age 67)
- Place of birth: St. Louis, Missouri, United States
- Position: Forward

Youth career
- 1977–1980: Rockhurst University

Senior career*
Years	Team	Apps	(Gls)
1981–1984	Kansas City Comets (indoor)	36	(10)
- * Club domestic league appearances and goals

Craig A. Stahl is a retired American soccer forward who played professionally in the Major Indoor Soccer League.

In 1977, Stahl graduated from Collinsville High School where he was a 1976 All State soccer player. He then attended Rockhurst University. playing on the Rockhurst soccer team from 1977 to 1980. He was a three time NAIA and a 1980 NCAA Honorable Mention All American. In 1979, he was MVP of the NAIA national men's soccer championship as Rockhurst finished runner-up to Quincy University. Stahl was inducted into the Rockhurst Athletic Hall of Fame in 1999. In 1980, the Wichita Wings selected Stahl in the fourth round of the Major Indoor Soccer League draft. He did not sign with the Wings, but remained in college until 1981. That year, he signed with the Kansas City Comets of the Major Indoor Soccer League where he played for three seasons.
