= Edmond Rugova =

Yugoslavian football player and coach

Personal information
- Full name: Edmond Rugova
- Date of birth: 20 July 1957 (age 69)
- Place of birth: Peja, FPR Yugoslavia
- Height: 1.82 m (6 ft 0 in)
- Position: Striker

Senior career*
Years	Team	Apps	(Gls)
1975–1979	Liria Prizren		
1977	→ RHMK Kosovo (loan)		
1979–1985	FC Prishtina	98	(29)
1985	New York Cosmos		
1986–1987	Kansas City Comets		

International career
- Yugoslavia U-20

Managerial career
- 2006–2009: Kosovo
- 2011: Sporting Kansas City Juniors
- * Club domestic league appearances and goals

Edmond Rugova (born 20 July 1957) is a Yugoslavian football coach and former football player. Rugova formerly coached the Kosovo national football team, a post he held since his appointment by the Football Federation of Kosovo in the summer of 2006 until his departure in July 2009.

== Playing career ==
=== Club ===
Before he became the coach of the Kosovo national football team, Edmond Rugova was a famous football player in Kosovo playing for FC Prishtina during the 1980s as part of the so-called "Golden Generation" of Kosovar football players that included Fadil Vokrri, Agim Cana, Fadil Muriqi and others. In his early career he also represented RHMK Kosovo (1977, loan) and KF Liria Prizren (1975–1979). For FC Prishtina (1979–1985), he played 98 league matches and scored 29 goals. He left tension-filled Kosovo for the US and joined New York Cosmos in 1985, then also had a spell with MISL outfit Kansas City Comets.

=== International ===
Ruguvoa played for the Yugoslavia national under-20 football team.

== Managerial career ==
Edmond Rugova's first international match as coach of the Kosovo national football team was the international friendly against Saudi Arabia to be played on 15 June 2007, in Ankara, Turkey. While Kosovo was not allowed to UEFA nor FIFA, it was hard to play regular games in the early years.

Edmond Rugova is currently a coach for the Sporting Kansas City Juniors.

== Personal life ==
His son Max was born in Kansas City and plays for FC Pristina.
