= Enzo Di Pede =

Canadian soccer player (born 1957)

Personal information
- Date of birth: January 3, 1957 (age 69)
- Place of birth: Sora, Italy
- Height: 5 ft 10 in (1.78 m)
- Position: Goalkeeper

Senior career*
Years	Team	Apps	(Gls)
1976–1978	Toronto Italia		
1978–1980	New York Arrows (indoor)	21	(0)
1979–1980	Rochester Lancers	22	(0)
1980–1981	Chicago Horizons (indoor)	16	(0)
1981–1986	Kansas City Comets (indoor)	114	(0)
1986–1987	Minnesota Strikers (indoor)	0	(0)

International career
1979	Canada U23	3	(0)
- * Club domestic league appearances and goals

Enzo Di Pede (born January 3, 1957) is a retired Italian-born goalkeeper who played in the North American Soccer League and the original Major Indoor Soccer League (MISL).

== Career ==
In 1976, he played in the National Soccer League with Toronto Italia for three seasons. Di Pede was a member of the MISL Champion New York Arrows as a backup goalkeeper in 1979–1980. Di Pede won MISL Goalkeeper of the Year honors in 1981 as a member of the Chicago Horizons and later played for the Kansas City Comets. On October 7, 1986, the Minnesota Strikers signed Di Pede, but he spent the season as a backup.

== International career ==
Di Pede played with the Canada men's national under-23 soccer team, and made his debut on April 1, 1979 against Bermuda.

== Personal life ==
Born in Italy, he and his family immigrated to Toronto, Ontario, Canada. Di Pede idolized long-time Italy national team goalkeeper Dino Zoff as a young soccer player.

Di Pede led a series of youth soccer camps in Kansas City, Missouri, U.S. with several fellow MISL players. After retiring, Di Pede, along with teammate Gino Schiraldi, opened a bagel shop and catering company in Kansas City.
