= Gino Schiraldi =

Canadian soccer player

Personal information
- Date of birth: March 20, 1958 (age 68)
- Place of birth: Toronto, Ontario, Canada
- Height: 5 ft 7 in (1.70 m)
- Position: Defender

Senior career*
Years	Team	Apps	(Gls)
1980–1981	Chicago Horizon (indoor)	9	(3)
1981–1991	Kansas City Comets (indoor)	388	(105)
1991–1992	Kansas City Attack (indoor)		

Managerial career
- 1997–1999: Kansas City Attack (assistant)
- * Club domestic league appearances and goals

Gino Schiraldi (born March 20, 1958) is a Canadian retired soccer defender who played eleven seasons in the Major Indoor Soccer League and one in the National Professional Soccer League.

In 1980, Schiraldi signed with the Chicago Horizon of the Major Indoor Soccer League. In 1981, he moved to the Kansas City Comets where he remained until the team folded 1991. In October 1991, he signed with the Kansas City Attack of the National Professional Soccer League. He retired in 1991, but returned to the Attack in September 1997 as an assistant coach.

== Career statistics ==
Total Games Played: 431

Total Goals Scored: 96

Total Assists: 104

Total Points: 200

Average Points per Game: 16.2
