= Engin Çınar =

Turkish footballer

Engin Çinar
Personal information
- Date of birth: 25 May 1954 (age 72)
- Place of birth: Trabzon, Turkey
- Position: Forward

Senior career*
Years	Team	Apps	(Gls)
1972–1977	Trabzonspor		
1977–1978	Galastasaray		
1977–1978	Beşiktaş		
1978–1979	Diyarbakır F.K.		
1980	Toronto Panhellenic		
1981–1982	New York Cosmos (indoor)	4	(1)
1981–1982	Kansas City Comets	1	(0)
- * Club domestic league appearances and goals

Engin Çınar (born May 25, 1954) is a Turkish former professional footballer who played as a forward most notably in the Süper Lig, and North American Soccer League.

== Career ==
Çınar played in the TFF First League in 1972 with Trabzonspor. The following season he assisted in securing promotion to the Süper Lig after winning the league title. In 1975, he secured the Super Lig title with Trabzonspor which clinched a position in the 1976–77 European Cup. He featured in the 1976–77 European Cup tournament and played against Liverpool, and recorded a goal against IA Akranes. In 1977, he signed with Galatasaray, but shortly was sent to play with Beşiktaş

In 1979, he played with Diyarbakır F.K. In 1981, he played abroad in the National Soccer League with Toronto Panhellenic. In the winter of 1981 he played in the North American Soccer League indoor season with New York Cosmos. He later played in the Major Indoor Soccer League with Kansas City Comets.
