= Manny Schwartz =

Israeli footballer

Manny Schwartz מני שוורץ
Personal information
- Full name: Emanuel Schwartz
- Date of birth: November 21, 1957 (age 68)
- Place of birth: Haifa, Israel
- Date of death: April 14, 2011
- Place of death: Ko Samui, Thailand
- Height: 6 ft 2 in (1.88 m)
- Position: Goalkeeper

Senior career*
Years	Team	Apps	(Gls)
1979-1981	Maccabi Tel Aviv F.C.	??	(0)
1981	Rochester Lancers	11	(0)
1981–1983	St. Louis Steamers (indoor)	26	(0)
1983–1986	Kansas City Comets (indoor)	56	(0)
- * Club domestic league appearances and goals

Manny Schwartz (Hebrew: מני שוורץ) was a retired Israeli soccer goalkeeper who played professionally in the North American Soccer League and Major Indoor Soccer League.

Schwartz served in the Israeli Army from 1976 to 1979. In 1976, he played for the Israeli Olympic soccer team. In 1978, he played for the Israel national team in the World Cup qualification round. In 1981, Schwartz signed with the Rochester Lancers of the North American Soccer League. In the fall of 1981, he moved indoors with the St. Louis Steamers of the Major Indoor Soccer League. He played two seasons with the Steamers, mostly as a backup. In 1983, he moved to the Kansas City Comets. He lost much of the 1983-1984 season with a shoulder injury, but in 1984, became the Comets first string goalkeeper. After outstanding second season with the Comets, Schwartz again lost a good part of the 1985-1986 season with injuries and was waived during the 1986 off season.

Schwartz died of a heart attack in 2011 in Ko Samui, Thailand, where he spent his final years.
