= Niki Nikolic =

Personal information
- Full name: Stojan Nikolić
- Date of birth: September 13, 1949 (age 77)
- Place of birth: Niš, Yugoslavia
- Position: Defender

Senior career*
| Years | Team | Apps | (Gls) |
| 1975–1978 | Radnički Niš | 48 | (3) |
| 1978 | Tulsa Roughnecks | 21 | (1) |
| 1979 | Radnički Niš | 4 | (0) |
| 1979–1980 | Philadelphia Fury | 35 | (0) |
| 1979–1980 | St. Louis Steamers (indoor) | 12 | (0) |
| 1980 | San Jose Earthquakes | 21 | (0) |
| 1980–1982 | Philadelphia Fever (indoor) | 74 | (5) |
| 1982–1983 | Baltimore Blast (indoor) | 10 | (0) |
| 1983–1984 | Kansas City Comets (indoor) | 6 | (0) |
| 1985–1986 | Baltimore Blast (indoor) | 5 | (0) |

Managerial career
- 1986–1988: Kansas City Comets (assistant)
- 1988–1991: Hershey Impact
- 1990: Washington Diplomats
- * Club domestic league appearances and goals

Stojan "Niki" Nikolic (Serbian Cyrillic: Cтojaн Николић – Hики, born 13 September 1949) is a retired Yugoslav-American soccer defender who played professionally in Yugoslavia and the United States, including the North American Soccer League and Major Indoor Soccer League. He also coached in the American Indoor Soccer Association and American Professional Soccer League.

== Player ==
Born in Niš, SR Serbia, SFR Yugoslavia, Nikolic played for his home town club FK Radnički Niš since 1975. In 1978, he moved to the United States where he played for the Tulsa Roughnecks in the North American Soccer League. At the end of the season, he returned to Radnički Niš for the winter season. In 1979, he moved back to the United States, this time permanently when he signed with the Philadelphia Fury. He played the 1979 season and began the 1980 season with the Fury before being traded to the San Jose Earthquakes. In addition to playing for the Fury, Nikolic also spent the 1979–1980 Major Indoor Soccer League season with the St. Louis Steamers. In the fall of 1980, he moved indoors permanently when he signed with the Philadelphia Fever. After two seasons, he joined the Baltimore Blast for one season, the Kansas City Comets for another season and the Blast once again in 1985–1986

== Coach ==
In 1986, the Kansas City Comets hired Stojan as an assistant coach, a position he held until 1988. In September 1988, he became the head coach of the Hershey Impact of the American Indoor Soccer Association. On May 25, 1990, Nikolic replaced John Ellinger as the head coach of the Washington Diplomats of the American Professional Soccer League. He also continued to coach the Impact until that team folded in 1992. Currently coaches several youth soccer teams under the name "Super Nova" out of Hershey, Pennsylvania.
