= Tyheim Monroe =

American basketball player

Free agent
- Position: Power forward

Personal information
- Born: November 22, 1995 (age 30)
- Listed height: 6 ft 7 in (2.01 m)
- Listed weight: 200 lb (91 kg)

Career information
- High school: Olney (Philadelphia, Pennsylvania)
- College: Cabrini (2014–2018)
- NBA draft: 2018: undrafted
- Playing career: 2018–present

Career history
- 2018–2019: Basquete UniFacisa
- 2021–2022: Rahoveci

Career highlights
- NABC Division III Player of the Year (2018); D3hoops.com Third-team All-American (2018); 2x CSAC Player of the Year (2017, 2018)

Tyheim Demetrious Monroe (born November 22, 1995) is an American basketball player who last played for Rahoveci. He played college basketball for the Cabrini Cavaliers and was named NABC Division III Player of the Year after his senior season.

== High school career ==
Monroe grew up in Philadelphia and began playing basketball at the age of six. He honed his basketball skills in playground courts and starred at Olney High School. As a junior, Monroe grew from 6'1 to 6'6. He committed to Cabrini University over Rosemont College.

== College career ==
As a freshman at Cabrini University, Monroe averaged 12 points per game. He averaged 18.4 points, 15.3 rebounds, and 2.6 assists per game as a sophomore and improved his three-point shooting. As a junior, Monroe averaged 21.8 points and 15.8 rebounds per game. He was selected to the National Association of Basketball Coaches Division III All-America second team. Monroe had 28 rebounds during his senior season against Centenary. As a senior, he averaged 21.5 points and 14.7 rebounds per game, second in Division III. He led Division III with 427 rebounds, 25 double-doubles and two triple doubles. Monroe was named a D3hoops.com Third Team All-American and the CSAC Player of the Year for the second consecutive season. He was named NABC Division III Player of the Year as well as NABC/Hero Sports First Team. Monroe led Cabrini to a 25-4 record and the NCAA Division III tournament before losing to Springfield, 96-88, in the second round. Monroe finished his career playing in the 2018 Reese’s Division III College All-Star Game. He graduated from Cabrini with a degree in Business management with a double minor in sports management and History.

== Professional career ==
At the conclusion of his collegiate career, Monroe signed with the Brazilian team Basquete UniFacisa in December 2018. He posted 16 points against Ranata/Rio Claro. In seven games, Monroe averaged 9.4 points, 7.4 rebounds, and 1.4 assists per game.
