= Stevie Reeves =

American racing driver

- Born: May 16, 1967 (age 59); Speedway, Indiana, U.S.
- Achievements: 1992, 1993 USAC Midget champion 2007–2008 NASCAR Sprint Cup Series champion spotter

NASCAR O'Reilly Auto Parts Series career
- 85 races run over 7 years
- Best finish: 20th (1997)
- First race: 1994 Goodwrench 200 (Rockingham)
- Last race: 1998 Gumout Long Life Formula 200 (Loudon)
Wins	Top tens	Poles
0	2	1

NASCAR FedEx Freight Truck Series career
- 3 races run over 1 year
- Best finish: 69th (2000)
- First race: 2000 Kroger 225 (Kentucky)
- Last race: 2000 Michigan 200 (Michigan)
Wins	Top tens	Poles
0	0	0

IndyCar Series career
- 4 races run over 2 years
- Best finish: 23rd (2000)
- First race: 1998 VisionAire 500K (Charlotte)
- Last race: 2000 Excite 500 (Texas)
Wins	Podiums	Poles
0	0	0

Stevie Reeves (born May 16, 1967) is an American professional stock car racing driver and spotter.

== Driving career ==
After several seasons racing on the bullrings (short tracks) of Indiana, Reeves traveled nationally with the United States Automobile Club and wound up winning back-to-back USAC National Midget titles in 1992 for the Wilke Racers and in 1993 for midget car owner Steve Lewis.

After collecting those two titles, Reeves ventured into the NASCAR Busch Grand National Series in 1994 joining Mark Thomas Racing with Clabber Girl sponsorship on the No. 96 Chevrolet. In 1995, Reeves collected his first pole at Bristol Motor Speedway and got his first top-ten with a sixth-place finish at Richmond International Raceway. His career best finish in the final points standings for the Busch Series was in 1997 when he took twentieth place.

Ultimately, Reeves' career in the Busch Series was for the most part underwhelming. He never could hold a steady ride in his NASCAR career, which lasted from 1994 to 1998. Reeves was employed by five different car owners in his five seasons (Mark Thomas, Ed Whitaker, Mike Curb, Donald Laird, and David Ridling).

After his stint in Busch, Reeves returned to his roots in open-wheel racing in 1998. Reeves made his first start in the Indy Racing League at the Charlotte Motor Speedway in North Carolina on July 25 of that year, finishing an impressive tenth for Pagan Racing. He drove three more IRL races in 2000 for Logan Racing, suffering mechanical failures in each event.

Reeves returned to the USAC Silver Crown Series in 1998, wheeling the Johnny Vance/Raybestos No. 28 Beast.

Reeves was inducted into the National Midget Auto Racing Hall of Fame in 2023.

== Spotting ==
In 2005, he was employed with Dale Earnhardt, Inc. in NASCAR spotting for Paul Menard in the Busch series. He also drove in the USAC Silver Crown Series. Reeves was the spotter for Dale Earnhardt Jr. in the 2004 Daytona 500, Earnhardt's first win in the event.

Reeves moved Hendrick Motorsports in 2007 as the spotter of Jimmie Johnson's No. 48 team, replacing Earl Barban. With Reeves, Johnson won sixteen races and the 2007 and 2008 championships, but Reeves was laid off after the 2008 season.

After working as a spotter for JTG Daugherty Racing's No. 47 car of Ryan Preece, Reeves joined Christopher Bell's No. 95 Leavine Family Racing team in 2020. In the midst of the 2025 Season, just a week after spotting Bell to victory in the All-Star Race, it was announced that Reeves would no longer serve as Bell's spotter, with Matt Philpott named as his replacement.

== Racing record ==
=== American Open Wheel ===
(key)

==== IndyCar results ====
Year	Team	1	2	3	4	5	6	7	8	9	10	11	Rank	Points	Ref
**1998**	Pagan Racing	WDW	PHX	INDY	TXS	NHM	DOV	CLT; 10	PPIR	ATL	TX2	LVS	**35th**	**20**	
**2000**	Logan Racing	WDW	PHX	LVS	INDY	TXS	PPI	ATL; 22	KTY; 21	TX2; 22			**33rd**	**25**	

=== NASCAR ===
(key) (Bold – Pole position awarded by qualifying time. Italics – Pole position earned by points standings or practice time. * – Most laps led.)

==== Busch Series ====
NASCAR Busch Series results
Year	Team	No.	Make	1	2	3	4	5	6	7	8	9	10	11	12	13	14	15	16	17	18	19	20	21	22	23	24	25	26	27	28	29	30	31	32	NBSC	Pts	Ref
1993				DAY	CAR	RCH	DAR	BRI	HCY	ROU	MAR	NZH	CLT	DOV	MYB	GLN	MLW	TAL	IRP	MCH	NHA	BRI	DAR	RCH	DOV	ROU	CLT	MAR	CAR; DNQ	HCY	ATL					NA	-	
1994	Thomas Racing	96	Chevy	DAY	CAR; 20				DAR; 34	HCY; 17	BRI; DNQ	ROU; 22	NHA; DNQ	NZH; 27	CLT; DNQ	DOV; 16	MYB; 18	GLN; 30	MLW; 35	SBO; DNQ	TAL; DNQ	HCY; DNQ	IRP; 31	MCH; 16	BRI; 17	DAR; 28	RCH; 28	DOV; 30	CLT; 41	MAR; 20	CAR; 13					26th	1817	
1994	Thomas Racing	96	Olds			RCH; 25	ATL; DNQ	MAR; 13																												26th	1817	
1995	Whitaker Racing	7	Chevy	DAY; 43	CAR; 20	RCH; 6	ATL; 33	NSV; 34	DAR; 35	BRI; 33	HCY	NHA	NZH	CLT; DNQ	DOV; 21	MYB	GLN	MLW; 26	TAL; 41	SBO	IRP; 12	MCH; 31	**BRI**; 14	DAR; 38	RCH; 34	DOV; 35	CLT; DNQ	CAR; 19	HOM; 20							29th	1454	
1996	Andretti-Laird Racing	96	Ford	DAY; DNQ	CAR; 15	RCH; DNQ	ATL; DNQ	NSV; 32	DAR; 33	BRI; DNQ	HCY	NZH	CLT; 23	DOV; 19	SBO	MYB	GLN; 23	MLW; 20	NHA	TAL; 33	IRP; 34	MCH; 34	BRI; 33	DAR; 18	RCH; 35	DOV; 17	CLT; 16	CAR; DNQ	HOM; DNQ							36th	1290	
1997	Andretti-Laird Racing	96	Ford	DAY; 13	CAR; 21	RCH; 36			DAR; 30	HCY; 17	TEX; 33	BRI; 13	NSV; 14	TAL; 20	NHA; 26	NZH; 32	CLT; 27	DOV; 21	SBO; DNQ	GLN; 16	MLW; 27	MYB; 24	GTY; 42	IRP; 21	MCH; 29	BRI; 7	DAR; 17		DOV; 20	CLT; 24	CAL; 37	CAR; 26	HOM; DNQ			20th	2528	
1997	Andretti-Laird Racing	96	Chevy				ATL; 28	LVS; 16																				RCH; 43								20th	2528	
1998	Curb Racing	43	Ford	DAY; 39	CAR; 39	LVS	NSV; 41	DAR	BRI	TEX	HCY	TAL																								84th	159	
1998	Curb Racing	43	Chevy										NHA; 30	NZH	CLT	DOV	RCH	PPR	GLN	MLW	MYB	CAL	SBO													84th	159	
1998	Team IGA	54	Chevy																					IRP; DNQ	MCH	BRI	DAR	RCH	DOV	CLT	GTY	CAR	ATL	HOM		84th	159	
1999	Team Rensi Motorsports	25	Chevy	DAY	CAR	LVS	ATL	DAR	TEX	NSV	BRI	TAL; DNQ	CAL; DNQ	NHA	RCH	NZH	CLT	DOV	SBO	GLN	MLW	MYB	PPR	GTY	IRP	MCH	BRI	DAR	RCH	DOV	CLT	CAR	MEM	PHO	HOM	NA	-	

==== Craftsman Truck Series ====
NASCAR Craftsman Truck Series results
Year	Team	No.	Make	1	2	3	4	5	6	7	8	9	10	11	12	13	14	15	16	17	18	19	20	21	22	23	24	NCTC	Pts	Ref
2000	Brevak Racing	31	Ford	DAY	HOM	PHO	MMR	MAR	PIR	GTY	MEM	PPR	EVG	TEX	KEN; 27	GLN	MLW; 30	NHA	NZH	MCH; 24	IRP	NSV	CIC	RCH	DOV	TEX	CAL	69th	246	
