= Duncan MacEwan =

Scottish footballer

Personal information
- Date of birth: 25 November 1958 (age 67)
- Place of birth: Dundee, Scotland
- Positions: Forward; midfielder

College career
Years	Team	Apps	(Gls)
1978–1981	Penn State Nittany Lions		

Senior career*
Years	Team	Apps	(Gls)
1981–1982	Denver Avalanche (indoor)		
1983–1986	St. Louis Steamers (indoor)		
1986–1987	Tampa Bay Rowdies (indoor)		
1987–1988	Kansas City Comets (indoor)		
1989	Tampa Bay Rowdies		
- * Club domestic league appearances and goals

Duncan MacEwan is a Scottish retired footballer who played professionally in the Major Indoor Soccer League, American Indoor Soccer Association and third American Soccer League.

== Career ==
MacEwan attended Penn State University where he was a 1980 Honorable Mention (third team) All American and 1981 Second Team All American. In 1981, the Denver Avalanche selected MacEwan in the Major Indoor Soccer League draft. In 1983, he signed with the St. Louis Steamers where he played three seasons. In 1986, he moved to the Tampa Bay Rowdies of the American Indoor Soccer Association. He returned to MISL in September 1987 with the Kansas City Comets. In 1989, he played for the Tampa Bay Rowdies of the American Soccer League.
