= Jan Goossens =

Dutch footballer and coach

Personal information
- Date of birth: 18 December 1958 (age 67)
- Place of birth: Velp, Netherlands
- Height: 1.84 m (6 ft 1/2 in)
- Position: Striker

Youth career
- Gelria
- 1976–1977: NEC

Senior career*
Years	Team	Apps	(Gls)
1977–1979	NEC	12	(0)
1979–1982	Edmonton Drillers	139	(92)
1979	→ Heracles	15	(7)
1982–1984	Golden Bay Earthquakes	96	(64)
1984–1986	Minnesota Strikers (indoor)	93	(71)
1986–1991	Kansas City Comets (indoor)	227	(221)
1991–1992	Dallas Sidekicks (indoor)	29	(19)
Total		612	(474)

Managerial career
- 1999–2002: SC Veluwezoom
- 2004–2008: Gazelle Nieuwland
- * Club domestic league appearances and goals

Jan Goossens (born 18 December 1958) is a former Dutch soccer player and coach. He played for clubs from the Netherlands and Canada, but spent most of his career in the United States of America. Jan Goossens played 612 official matches and scored a total of 474 goals during his career.

== Career ==
=== Youth ===
Jan Goossens was born and raised in Velp, Netherlands, where he played his youth soccer at the local soccer team Gelria. At the age of 18 he started playing for the professional soccer team NEC from Nijmegen.

=== NEC Nijmegen ===
On October 16, 1977, Jan Goossens made his debut on the first squad of NEC Nijmegen in a home match against FC Twente. Goossens played 13 matches for NEC. Almost a year after his debut, Jan Goossens played his last match for NEC against FC Den Haag on October 25, 1978.

=== Edmonton Drillers ===
In the beginning of 1979 Jan Goossens transferred from NEC to the Edmonton Drillers of the North American Soccer League, where Hans Kraay Sr. was the head coach at that time. Goossens wasn't the only Dutch soccer player that moved to the Edmonton Drillers that year. Also Henk ten Cate, Dwight Lodeweges and Hans Kraay Jr. moved to the Edmonton Drillers in 1979–1980. On April 6, 1979, Jan Goossens made his debut for the Edmonton Drollers in an away match against the Vancouver Whitecaps. In the 1980–81 season Jan Goossens won the NASL Indoor competition with the Edmonton Drillers. Goossens played a total of 139 matches for the Edmonton Drillers, in which he scored 92 goals. In 1982 the Edmonton Drillers folded due to financial troubles, which caused Goossens to leave for a club from the United States of America.

=== Heracles Almelo ===
From October 1979 till March 1980 Goossens was out on loan to Heracles Almelo. During this period the American competition had ended, which made it possible for Dutch soccer players to go out on loan to Dutch teams. Goossens played 15 matches for Heracles Almelo, in which he scored 7 goals. On March 2, 1980, Goossens played his last match for Heracles Almelo against FC Eindhoven. After that match his loan period ended and he had to return to the Edmonton Drillers.

=== Golden Bay Earthquakes ===
In 1982 Goossens moved from the Canadian Edmonton Drillers to the American Golden Bay Earthquakes. That year, the Golden Bay Earthquakes, normally an NASL team, spent the indoor season playing in the Major Indoor Soccer League (MISL). The Earthquakes returned to the NASL for the 1983 summer season and Goossens remained with the team into the 1984 season. He was hindered by a knee injury in 1984 and was transferred to the Minnesota Strikers late in the season.

=== Minnesota Strikers ===
Jan Goossens left the Golden Bay Earthquakes in 1984 for the Minnesota Strikers, but due to his knee injury he was not able to play any match the first season. The Minnesota Strikers ended the 1985-1986 MISL season as runner up, after losing the playoff final against the San Diego Sockers (4-3). Jan Goossens played a total of 93 games for the Minnesota Strikers, in which he scored 71 goals.

=== Kansas City Comets ===
In 1986 Jan Goossens left the Minnesota Strikers and moved to the Kansas City Comets, where he would play until that team folded in 1991. Goossens played three MISL playoff finals with the Kansas City Comets, but the team ended up as runner-up every time. Jan Goossens holds the Kansas City Comets all-time record for the most goals, by scoring 221 goals in 227 games. Goossens also holds the Kansas City Comets all-time record for the most assists, by giving 237 assists in 227 games. In the 1989–1990 seasons Goossens even got the MISL Pass Master Award, which was given out to the player with the most assists during the regular season.

=== Dallas Sidekicks ===
After a very successful period at the Kansas City Comets, Jan Goossens moved to the Dallas Sidekicks in 1991. His teammate David Doyle made the same move. Jan Goossens played 29 games for the Dallas Sidekicks, in which he scored 19 goals. In July 1992 with the league on verge of collapsing, Goossens announced his retirement.

== Prices ==
- NASL indoor champion: season 1980–81
- MISL Pass Master Award: season 1989–90

== Indoor Soccer Hall of Fame ==
In September 2022, Jan Goossens was a member of the inaugural class of inductees into the Indoor Soccer Hall of Fame.

== Trivia ==
- Most scoring Dutch player in the North American Soccer League (NASL)
- All-time record leader for the most goals for the Kansas City Comets
- All-time record leader for the most assists for the Kansas City Comets
- 6th all-time points leader of the Major Indoor Soccer League (MISL)
- 5th all-time leader of goals of the Major Indoor Soccer League (MISL)
- 5th all-time leader of assists of the Major Indoor Soccer League (MISL)
