= Max Rugova =

American soccer player

Personal information
- Full name: Edmond Max Rugova Jr.
- Date of birth: 17 February 2000 (age 26)
- Place of birth: Overland Park, Kansas, United States
- Height: 1.88 m (6 ft 2 in)
- Position: Striker

Team information
- Current team: Dukagjini
- Number: 17

Youth career
- 2013–2018: Sporting Kansas City
- 2018–2019: 1. FC Nürnberg
- 2019–: Prishtina

Senior career*
Years	Team	Apps	(Gls)
2017–2018	Sporting Kansas City	0	(0)
2017	→ Swope Park Rangers (loan)	8	(1)
2019	Prishtina	1	(0)
2023	Gold Star FC	9	(2)
2023	Savannah Clovers FC	7	(2)
2024–	Dukagjini	8	(1)

International career^{‡}
2018	Kosovo U19	2	(0)
- * Club domestic league appearances and goals as of June 14, 2024 ‡ National team caps and goals as of 13 October 2018

Edmond Max Rugova Jr. (born 17 February 2000), commonly known as Max Rugova or Max Rugova Jr. is a professional footballer who plays as a striker for Dukagjini. Born in the United States, he has represented Kosovo at youth level.

== Club career ==
=== Early career ===
Rugova joined the academy ahead of the 2013–14 season and has played for both the Under-16 and Under-18 groups, he had 14 goals in 27 games while splitting time between the two teams in the 2015–16 season, while the winger has five goals in nine games for the U16s so far in the 2016–17 season. He has spent significant time training with the Swope Park Rangers since the start of 2016 and won a penalty in a friendly match against the Tulsa Golden Hurricane, on 16 April 2016.

=== 1. FC Nürnberg ===
==== Under-19 ====
On 25 August 2018, Rugova joined Under 19 Bundesliga side 1. FC Nürnberg U19. On 16 September 2018, he made his debut in a 1–4 home defeat against Mainz 05 U19, starting the match before being substituted off in the 74th minute for Thomas Schmidt.

=== Prishtina ===
On 14 August 2019, Rugova joined Football Superleague of Kosovo side Prishtina. On 7 October 2019, he made his debut in a 1–0 away defeat against Ballkani after coming on as a substitute at 73rd minute in place of Kreshnik Uka.

== International career ==
=== United States ===
==== Under-17 ====
In May 2016, Rugova received a call-up from United States U17 for a training camp at IMG Academy in Bradenton, Florida.

=== Kosovo ===
==== Under-19 ====
On 18 May 2018, Rugova received a call-up from Kosovo U19 for the friendly matches against Albania U19. On 24 May 2018, he made his debut with Kosovo U19 in first match against Albania U19 after being named in the starting line-up.

===== 2019 UEFA European Under-19 Championship qualifications =====
On 2 October 2018, Rugova was named as part of the Kosovo U19 squad for 2019 UEFA European Under-19 Championship qualifications. On 10 October 2018, he made his debut with Kosovo U19 in a match against Austria U19 after being named in the starting line-up.

== Personal life ==
His father Edmond played for FC Pristina and Kansas City Comets and managed the Kosovo national football team in its early years.
