= Chris Duke (soccer) =

American soccer player

Personal information
- Date of birth: October 22, 1967 (age 59)
- Place of birth: Las Vegas, Nevada, U.S.
- Height: 5 ft 11 in (1.80 m)
- Position: Defender

Youth career
- 1985–1988: San Diego Toreros

Senior career*
Years	Team	Apps	(Gls)
1989–1991	Kansas City Comets (indoor)	71	(2)
1992	Kansas City Attack (indoor)		
1995	Pittsburgh Stingers (indoor)	20	(3)
- * Club domestic league appearances and goals

Chris Duke is an American retired soccer defender who played professionally in the Major Indoor Soccer League and Continental Indoor Soccer League.

Duke attended the University of San Diego, playing on the men's soccer team from 1985 to 1988. On July 9, 1989, the Kansas City Comets selected Duke in the third round of the Major Indoor Soccer League draft. The Comets folded at the end of the 1990–1991 season. On March 4, 1992, Duke signed with the Kansas City Attack. He played until the end of the season. On June 20, 1995, he joined the Pittsburgh Stingers of the Continental Indoor Soccer League.
