= Barrett Brooks =

American football player (born 1972)

No. 76, 77, 79, 72
- Position: Offensive tackle

Personal information
- Born: May 5, 1972 (age 54); St. Louis, Missouri, U.S.
- Listed height: 6 ft 5 in (1.96 m)
- Listed weight: 325 lb (147 kg)

Career information
- High school: Florissant (MO) McCluer North
- College: Kansas State
- NFL draft: 1995: 2nd round, 58th overall pick

Career history
- Philadelphia Eagles (1995–1998); Detroit Lions (1999–2000); Cleveland Browns (2001)*; Denver Broncos (2002)*; Green Bay Packers (2002); New York Giants (2002); Pittsburgh Steelers (2003–2006)
- * Offseason or practice squad member only

Awards and highlights
- Super Bowl champion (XL); Second-team All-Big Eight (1993)

Career NFL statistics
- Games played: 118
- Games started: 62
- Fumble recoveries: 3
- Stats at Pro Football Reference

Barrett Charles Brooks (born May 5, 1972) is an American former professional football player who was an offensive tackle in the National Football League (NFL). He played college football for the Kansas State Wildcats. He played in the NFL for the Pittsburgh Steelers and was part of their Super Bowl XL win against the Seattle Seahawks.

== Early life ==
Brooks attended McCluer North High School in Florissant, Missouri and was a student and a letterman in football and basketball. In football, he was an All-State Honorable Mention selection.

== College career ==
Barrett attended Kansas State University and became a member of Omega Psi Phi fraternity, Delta Delta chapter.

== Professional career ==
=== Philadelphia Eagles ===
Brooks was selected 58th overall in the second round of the 1995 NFL Draft by the Eagles. Brooks played his first four years in the NFL with the Philadelphia Eagles, starting for the first three of those years.

=== Detroit Lions ===
Brooks then went to the Detroit Lions in 1999.

=== New York Giants ===
He played the 2002 season for the New York Giants.

=== Pittsburgh Steelers ===
Brooks reached his final destination when he played for the Pittsburgh Steelers. Brooks suffered a quad injury during the final preseason game of 2006. He was placed on the injured reserve and missed the season as a result.

== Personal life ==
He is married to his wife, Sonji. They have five children: Jasmine Johnson, Romel Brooks, Asia Johnson, Izreal Brooks, and Chyna Brooks. He and his family reside in Voorhees Township, New Jersey.
