= Germain Iglesias =

Peruvian footballer

Personal information
- Full name: Germain Andres Iglesias
- Date of birth: November 10, 1959 (age 66)
- Place of birth: Lima, Peru
- Position: Midfielder

College career
Years	Team	Apps	(Gls)
1979–1980	St. Francis Brooklyn Terriers		

Senior career*
Years	Team	Apps	(Gls)
1980–1981	Brooklyn Dodgers S.C.		
1981–1983	Buffalo Stallions (indoor)	92	(62)
1983–1984	Golden Bay Earthquakes	27	(4)
1983–1984	Golden Bay Earthquakes (indoor)		
1984–1985	Chicago Sting (indoor)	13	(3)
1985	San Jose Earthquakes		
- * Club domestic league appearances and goals

Germain Iglesias is a retired Peruvian soccer midfielder who played professionally in the North American Soccer League, Major Indoor Soccer League and Western Soccer Alliance.

While born in Peru, Iglesias grew up in Paterson, New Jersey. He attended Paterson Catholic High School where he set the Passaic County high school single season scoring record with 42 goals. He then attended St. Francis College and played amateur soccer with the Brooklyn Dodgers S.C. of the Cosmopolitan Soccer League. In 1979, the Dodgers won the National Challenge Cup. In 1981, he signed with the Buffalo Stallions of the Major Indoor Soccer League. He was the 1981–1982 MISL Rookie of the Year. He spent two seasons with the Stallions before outdoors with the Golden Bay Earthquakes of the North American Soccer League. He remained with the Earthquakes for two seasons, including the 1983–1984 indoor season. The Earthquakes did not play indoor soccer during the 1984–1985 season and in February 1985, Iglesias went on loan with the Chicago Sting. In 1985, he returned to the San Jose Earthquakes in the Western Alliance Challenge Series.

== Yearly Awards ==
- MISL Rookie of the Year: 1981–82
