= Emilio John =

Nigerian footballer

Personal information
- Date of birth: 15 January 1950 (age 76)
- Place of birth: Lagos, Nigeria
- Position: Forward

Youth career
- 1974–1977: Quincy University

Senior career*
Years	Team	Apps	(Gls)
1978	Sacramento Gold	23	(10)
1979	New Jersey Americans		
1979–1981	St. Louis Steamers (indoor)	50	(24)
1981–1983	Kansas City Comets (indoor)	7	(2)

International career
- Nigeria
- * Club domestic league appearances and goals

Emilio John is a retired Nigerian soccer forward. He played professionally in the American Soccer League where he was the 1978 Rookie of the Year, and the Major Indoor Soccer League. He was also a member of the Nigeria national football team.

== Career ==
John attended Quincy University, where he played on the men's soccer team from 1974 to 1977. During those year, Quincy won the 1974, 1975 and 1977 NAIA national men's soccer championship and John was a 1977 First Team All American soccer player. He graduated in 1978.

In 1978, John began his professional career with the Sacramento Gold of the American Soccer League. He was named Rookie of the Year. In 1979, he moved to the New Jersey Americans. He then played for the St. Louis Steamers and Kansas City Comets of the Major Indoor Soccer League. He has also played for the Nigerian Olympic and national soccer teams.

When John retired from playing, he remained in Kansas City, became a chiropractor, and helped found the Attack Youth Soccer Club. In 1985, he gained a Master's degree from the University of Kansas in Health Services Administration.
