= David Doyle (soccer) =

Irish soccer forward

Personal information
- Date of birth: August 8, 1965 (age 61)
- Place of birth: Dublin, Ireland
- Height: 5 ft 11 in (1.80 m)
- Position: Forward

Youth career
- 1983–1986: Campbell Fighting Camels

Senior career*
Years	Team	Apps	(Gls)
1987–1991	Kansas City Comets (indoor)	132	(79)
1991–2004	Dallas Sidekicks (indoor)	313	(410)
1992–1994	St. Louis Ambush (indoor)	61	(125)
1997–1998	Wichita Wings (indoor)	14	(23)
Total		520	(637)
- * Club domestic league appearances and goals

David Doyle (born August 8, 1965) is an Irish soccer forward who spent seventeen seasons playing indoor soccer in the United States. He was the 1987–1988 Major Indoor Soccer League Rookie of the Year, was the 1996 and 1999 indoor soccer scoring champion and a six time first team All Star.

== College ==
Doyle attended Campbell University where he played on the men's soccer team from 1983 to 1986. He led the country in scoring, with 34 goals, as a senior. He finished his career 72 goals and 19 assists for a school record 286 points. He was a 1986 second team All American and was inducted into the Campbell Hall of Fame in 2006.

== Professional ==
The Kansas City Comets of Major Indoor Soccer League drafted Doyle in the first round (third overall) in the 1987 MISL College Draft. He was the 1987–1988 MISL Rookie of the Year. When the Comets folded in 1991, Doyle signed as a free agent with the Dallas Sidekicks. He went on to play twelve seasons with the Sidekicks. Following the 1991–1992 season, the league collapsed and the Sidekicks moved to the Continental Indoor Soccer League (CISL), a summer indoor league. The Sidekicks won the first CISL championship but finished runner-up in 1992. That fall, Doyle signed with the St. Louis Ambush which played winter soccer in the National Professional Soccer League. He alternated between the Sidekicks and the Ambush for the next two years. In 1996, he was the leading U.S. indoor soccer player with 47 goals. He repeated as scoring champion in 1999 with 29 goals. Doyle also spent the 1997–1998 NPSL season with the Wichita Wings. In 1998, the Sidekicks spent the season in the Premier Soccer Alliance then moved to the World Indoor Soccer League for three seasons (1999–2001). In 2002, they moved to the newly established Major Indoor Soccer League. The team folded two seasons later and Doyle retired from playing professionally. Doyle is one of a select 4 players to have won 3 or more championships with the Dallas Sidekicks.

Doyle currently serves as the head soccer coach of the Flower Mound High School boys' soccer team in Flower Mound, Texas. David led the FMHS Jaguars to the Texas High School 6A Division State Championship in 2019. He is also a coach with the Renegades Soccer Club.

== Awards and honors ==
Doyle was inducted into the Campbell University Hall of Fame in 2005 for his time as an All-American varsity soccer player. In April 2015, the Big South Conference announced that Doyle would be among the Class of 2015 inducted into the Big South Conference Hall of Fame in recognition of his collegiate soccer career.

== Personal life ==
His son Conor plays professional soccer in England for Derby County as a forward and is currently on loan at D.C. United in Major League Soccer.
