= Spotter (auto racing) =

In auto racing a trained team member whose job is to relay information to their driver

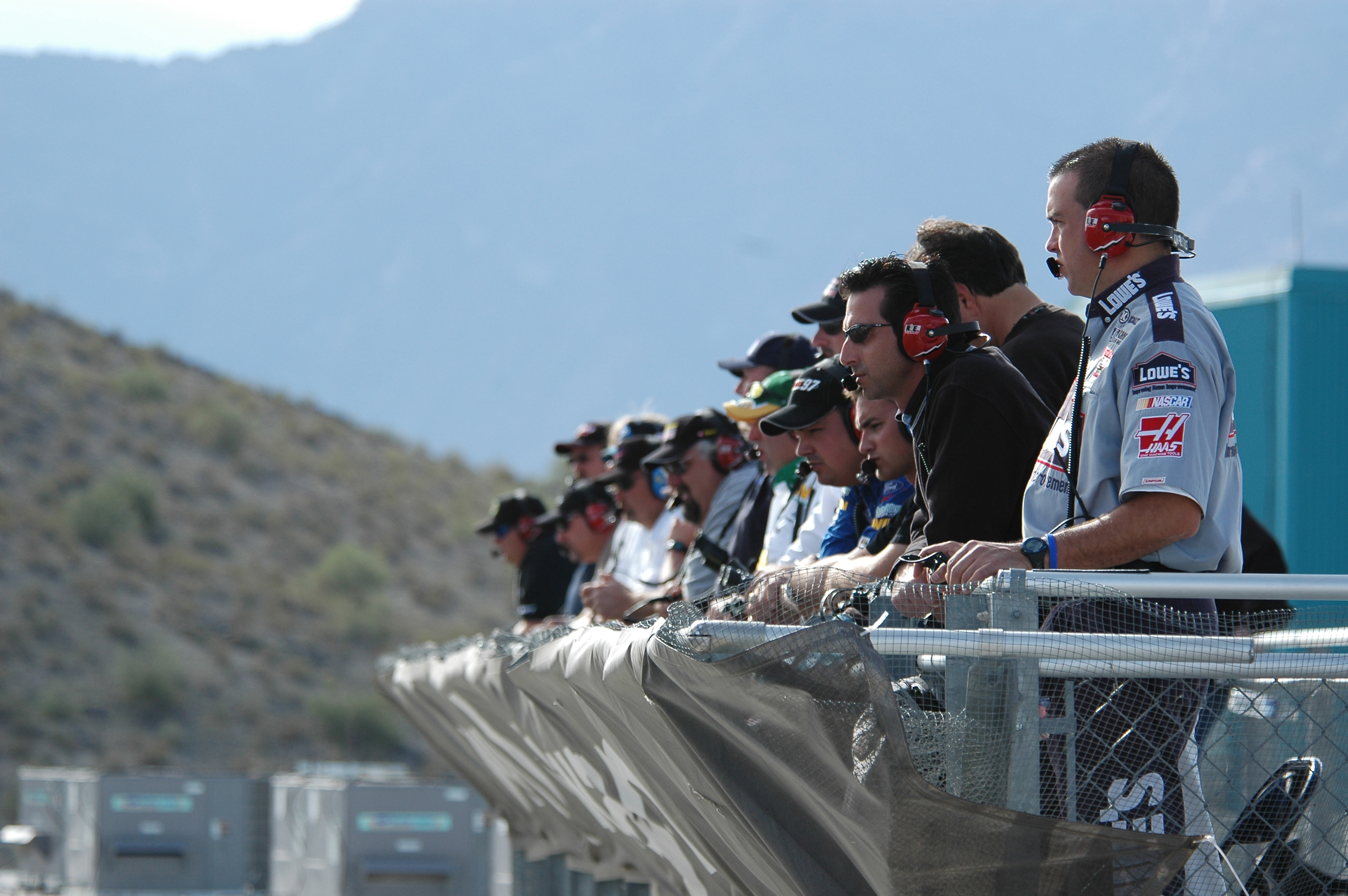
NASCAR spotters at Phoenix International Raceway – 2004

A spotter in auto racing is a trained team member whose job is to relay information to their driver, keeping them alert of what is occurring on the track. They are typically positioned higher, atop one of the grandstands or other support buildings, to see the entire track. Spotters keep in constant contact with their drivers via two-way radio communication. Spotters are considered the drivers' "eyes" and are one of the more notable yet simple, safety measures adopted by professional auto racing in the past two decades.

== History and facts ==
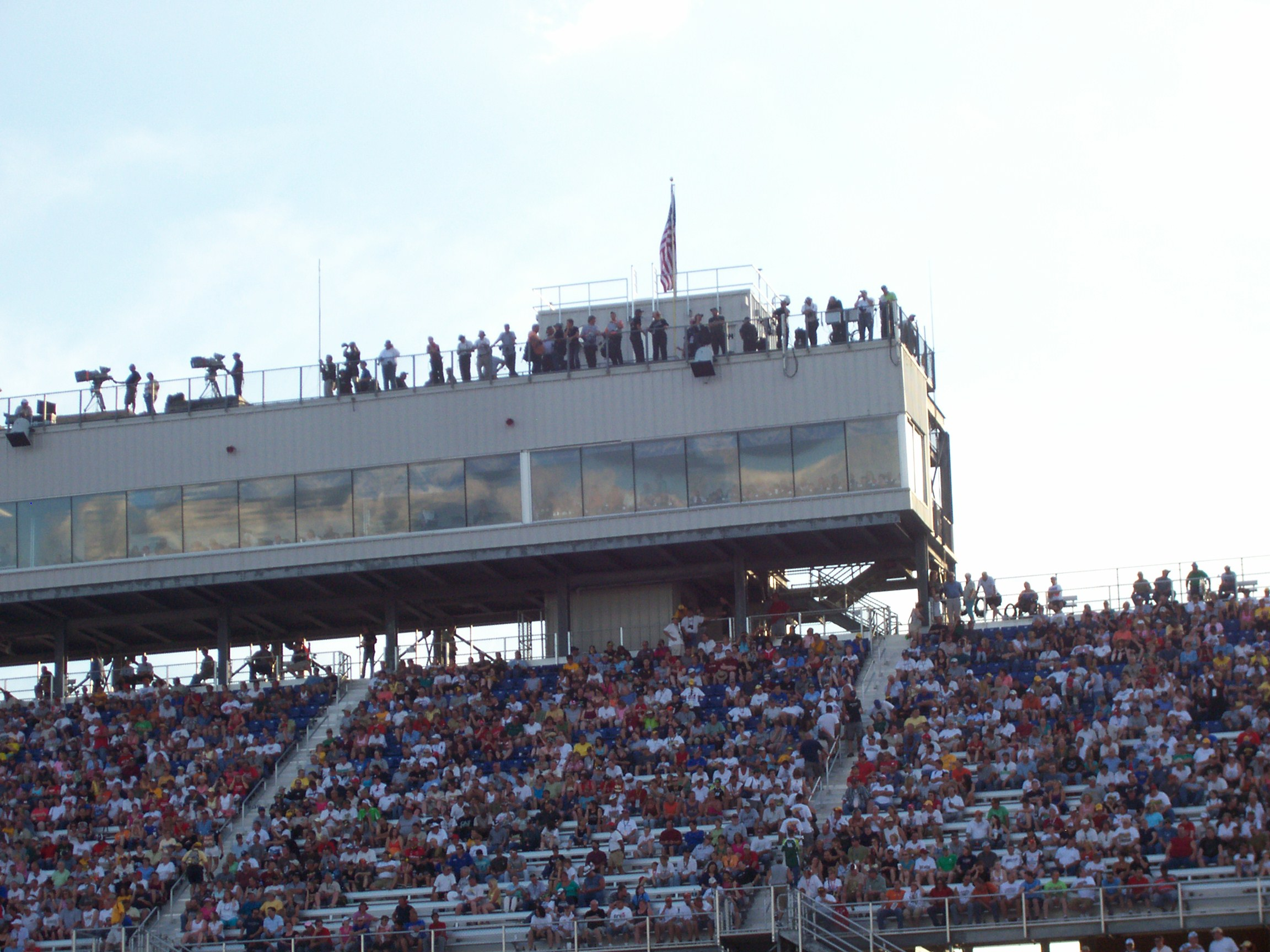
Spotters atop the tower at the Milwaukee Mile – 2009

Spotters became commonplace in NASCAR and CART in the late 1980s and early 1990s. Two-way radio communication between the driver and pit crew began in the 1970s and early 1980s; however, all communication was based in the pit area, and was primarily to discuss pit strategy and mechanical problems with the cars. No tracks had video boards, and monitors carrying the satellite feeds of the race telecast (which is standard in the pit areas nowadays) were still decades away. Pit crews notably had very little information on what was going on out on the track, outside of what they could observe firsthand from the pits.

Indycar driver Tom Sneva is credited as the first major driver to use a spotter in most races. A former high school teacher who also coached American football, Sneva was familiar with the long-standing practice in football of placing coaches in the elevated press box to gain extra information on the game, which they relayed via phone or radio to coaches and players on the sideline. He believed that this idea was easily transferrable to auto racing, in particular at oval circuits where drivers regularly contended with lapped traffic and large packs of cars in close traffic.

During the 1980s, more racing teams began experimenting with an additional crew member stationed at another position at the track. Some teams would station a crew member in an observation tower or a photography stand, while others would simply purchase tickets in the upper rows of the grandstands. The position gave the teams a unique view of the track, and allowed the "spotter" to relay information that could not be observed from the pits. Initially, the information gained was simple. For instance, if a crash occurred on the track, he could warn his driver about the location of the crash, and could advise on how to take evasive action. At other times, he could observe the other cars and relay information about their performance, if that knowledge would be beneficial. Also, before the teams possessed weather radar in the pits, the spotters could relay information about approaching rain for strategic purposes.

By the early to mid-1990s, NASCAR began to standardize the organization of the spotters, and eventually made them mandatory. At each track, a special area was reserved for the spotters, usually atop the grandstand or media center providing the best view of the circuit. At longer ovals (such as Daytona, Talladega, and Indianapolis) and at road courses multiple spotters are utilized, since it is not possible to see the entire track from one vantage point.

Spotters' duties increased as the years went by, and now include assisting drivers (particularly in "pack racing") in making passes and racing in heavy traffic. Since the drivers' helmets, wrap-around seats, and various safety equipment make peripheral vision difficult, and NASCAR race cars in all levels (Whelen Modified Tour, Craftsman Truck Series, Xfinity Series and NASCAR Cup Series) have no right side mirrors, a spotter's primary role is to become 'the mirrors' for their driver, notifying them of possible passing maneuvers from the blind spots and to avoid crashes.

Spotters also are known to work with each other in mutually beneficial situations, even if they are on competing teams. For instance, spotters for two cars running together might arrange for their respective drivers to synchronize their pit stops so that they can stay together as drafting partners. Spotters on competing teams might also arrange for their respective drivers to "gang up" on another car, so that they work together to improve their positions. Altercations on the track can also lead to heated exchanges among the respective spotters.

Spotters are former drivers, owners, instructors, or various crew members who do not otherwise have in-race duties. Spotters normally work closely with the driver, developing a personal vernacular and codes when strategies (especially pit orders) are required to avoid information being leaked to other drivers, crew chiefs and fellow spotters, and decide to what degree of detail the driver wants his information relayed. Some drivers may prefer constant streams of information, while others may insist on limited chatter. In addition, they may have agreed upon "dark" periods, where no discussion is allowed (e.g., a difficult part of the track or during a period of intense racing requiring deep concentration).

The job of spotting is often considered difficult and undesirable, despite its simple outward appearance. Spotters are required to stand for extended periods of time and can not break concentration, during practice sessions, time trials, and race periods, which could last as long as four or more hours at a time. Breaks are infrequent, or non-existent. Weather conditions in the spotters' high perches are usually to the extreme; unshaded from hot sun, unshielded from high winds (and wind chills), and unprotected from rain. The responsibility of keeping their driver safe on the track is also a working burden. Lapses in concentration can have considerable consequences to their driver on the track.
