= Hundert (card game) =

Card game

- Origin: Germany
- Players: 2+
- Skills: counting, tactics
- Age range: 6+
- Cards: 32
- Deck: French
- Rank (high→low): A 10 K Q J 9 8 7
- Playing time: 5 minutes

Hundert ("One Hundred") is an ace–ten card game for 3 or more players that is suitable for children.

== Rules ==
The following rules are based on Gööck.

A 32-card French pack (Piquet pack) is used. Cards rank in the usual ace–ten order and follow the Skat schedule whereby A = 11, 10 = 10, K = 4, Q = 3, J = 2 and the remaining cards are blanks or 'sparrows' (Spatzen). The aim is to avoid being the player who raises the total number of card points on the table past 100 (hence the name).

The same number of cards is dealt to each player and any left over are placed, face up, on the table, the dealer announcing their total value in card points. Each player in turn plays a card of their choice from their hand onto the table pile, face up, and announces the new total of card points. When a player causes the total score of the cards on the table to exceed 100 points, they have lost and must pay each opponent a number of chips equalling the overshoot points i.e. if they have raised the total to 104, they must pay 4 chips to each opponent. If a player succeeds in raising the total to exactly 100 points they win 3 chips from each opponent.

Hülsemann suggests that, with children, the loser may pay a forfeit. In Feder, the player overshooting the 100 mark pays one chip to each opponent. If he scores exactly 100, he receives one chip.

== Literature ==
- Feder, Jan; Oker, Eugen (1980). Die schönsten Kartenspiele über 100 Variationen mit dem Skatblatt (in German) (2nd ed.). München: Droemersche Verlagsanstalt Th. Kanur Nachf., Freising. ISBN 978-3-426-07628-6. OCLC 615580208.
- Gööck, Roland (1967). Freude am Kartenspiel : Spielregeln für die 100 beliebtesten Kartenspiele und Spielarten (in German). C. Bertelsmann. OCLC 460500170.
- Hülsemann, Robert (1930). Das Buch der Spiele für Familie und Gesellschaft (in German). Leipzig: Hesse & Becker. OCLC 258563606.
- von Hahn, Alban (1905). Das Buch der Spiele.
