= Emilio Romero (soccer) =

American soccer player and coach

Personal information
- Full name: Emilio Romero
- Date of birth: June 30, 1954 (age 72)
- Place of birth: Denver, Colorado, U.S.
- Height: 5 ft 8 in (1.73 m)
- Position: Forward

Youth career
- 1974–1977: Metro State College

Senior career*
Years	Team	Apps	(Gls)
1978	Minnesota Kicks	10	(2)
1979	Columbus Magic	20	(25)
1979–1981	St. Louis Steamers (indoor)	75	(45)
1981–1982	Kansas City Comets (indoor)	17	(5)
1980	Golden Gate Gales	18	(22)
1980	California Sunshine	7	(2)
1982–1983	Los Angeles Lazers (indoor)	45	(14)
1984–1988	Colorado Comets (indoor)		
1996-1997	Wichita Wings (indoor)	31	(13)
1997	Arizona Sandsharks (indoor)	24	(9)

International career
1976	United States		

Managerial career
- 1984–1988: Colorado Comets (player-coach)
- 1989–1991: Colorado Foxes
- 1992–1995: Fort Lauderdale Strikers / Miami Freedom
- 1996: Colorado Rapids (assistant)
- * Club domestic league appearances and goals

Emilio Romero (born June 30, 1954) is an American retired soccer forward who played professionally in the North American Soccer League (NASL), American Soccer League (ASL), and the Major Indoor Soccer League (MISL). He also represented the United States in 1976. Romero's coaching career included roles as player-coach for the Colorado Comets and assistant coach for the Colorado Rapids and Fort Lauderdale Strikers.

== Playing career ==
Romero played collegiate soccer at Metropolitan State University of Denver from 1974 to 1977, where he was the leading scorer in the nation for both NAIA and NCAA in 1977, a record that stood for 13 years. In 1976, he earned caps for the U.S. national team across two seasons.

In 1978, Romero began his professional career with the Minnesota Kicks in the NASL, appearing in 10 matches and scoring 2 goals. In 1979, he joined the Columbus Magic of the ASL, where he scored 25 goals in 20 appearances. That same year, he transitioned to indoor soccer, signing with the St. Louis Steamers of the MISL, where he played 75 games and scored 45 goals over two seasons. In the 1981–1982 season, he was traded to the Kansas City Comets, playing 17 games and scoring 5 goals.

During the 1980 outdoor season, Romero played for the Golden Gate Gales in the ASL, scoring 22 goals in 18 matches. He concluded his playing career with the Los Angeles Lazers in the 1982–1983 MISL season, scoring 14 goals in 24 games, and later with the Colorado Comets in the Southwest Professional League from 1984 to 1988, where he also served as player-coach.

Romero made a late-career return to professional indoor soccer nearly a decade after his initial run in the MISL, playing for the Wichita Wings in the NPSL during the 1996–1997 season and for the Arizona Sandsharks in the CISL in 1997.

== Coaching career ==
Romero began his coaching career as player-coach for the Colorado Comets in the Southwest Professional League from 1984 to 1988. From 1989 to 1991, he was head coach of the Colorado Foxes in the American Professional Soccer League (APSL). Between 1992 and 1995, he coached the Fort Lauderdale Strikers and Miami Freedom in the APSL. On February 1, 1996, Romero was hired as an assistant coach for the Colorado Rapids in Major League Soccer (MLS).

Additionally, Romero ran the Emilio Romero Professional Soccer Camps from 1974 to 1989, contributing to youth soccer development in Colorado.

== Honors ==
- Colorado Youth Soccer Hall of Fame
- Metropolitan State University of Denver Athletics Hall of Fame
