= Chris Hundelt =

American soccer player

Personal information
- Date of birth: July 16, 1963 (age 63)
- Place of birth: St. Louis, Missouri, U.S.
- Position: Defender

Youth career
- 1982–1985: SIU Edwardsville Cougars

Senior career*
Years	Team	Apps	(Gls)
1987–1989	Kansas City Comets (indoor)	20	(3)

International career
- U.S. U-20
- * Club domestic league appearances and goals

Chris Hundelt is an American retired soccer defender.

In 1981, Hundelt played all three games for the United States men's national under-20 soccer team at the 1981 FIFA World Youth Championship. He graduated from Rosary High School in St. Louis, Missouri. He attended Southern Illinois University Edwardsville, playing on the men's soccer team from 1982 to 1985. He was a 1983 Third Team All American. On June 4, 1987, the Kansas City Comets signed Hundelt to a three-year contract. He spent two seasons with the Comets.
