= Doug Neely =

American soccer player

Personal information
- Date of birth: May 31, 1965 (age 61)
- Place of birth: Garden Grove, California, U.S.
- Height: 5 ft 11 in (1.80 m)
- Position: Defender

College career
Years	Team	Apps	(Gls)
1983–1984	San Diego State Aztecs		
1985–1986	Chapman Panthers		

Senior career*
Years	Team	Apps	(Gls)
1987–1989	Los Angeles Lazers (indoor)	76	(9)
1989–1991	Kansas City Comets (indoor)	95	(18)
1991–1992	Baltimore Blast (indoor)	40	(8)
1992–1994	Baltimore Spirit (indoor)	71	(19)
1993	Los Angeles United (indoor)	27	(16)
1994–1997	Anaheim Splash (indoor)	54	(63)
1996–1997	Baltimore Spirit (indoor)	34	(7)
1996–1997	Anaheim Splash (indoor)	52	(26)
1998–2002	Baltimore Blast (indoor)	134	(28)
- * Club domestic league appearances and goals

Doug Neely is an American retired soccer defender who had an extensive career in several American indoor leagues including the original Major Indoor Soccer League, Continental Indoor Soccer League and National Professional Soccer League.

== Youth ==
In 1983, Neely graduated from Canyon High School where he was the 1983 Los Angeles Times High School Player of the Year. He attended the San Diego State University, playing on the men's soccer team in 1983 and 1984. Following his sophomore season, he transferred to Chapman University where he finished his collegiate career. Chapman inducted Neely into the school's Athletic Hall of Fame in 2007.

== Professional ==
In 1987, Neely attended an open tryout with the Los Angeles Lazers of the Major Indoor Soccer League. He played well enough to earn a reserve contract. He then worked himself into the first team where he remained for two seasons. When the Lazers folded in 1989, the Kansas City Comets selected Neely in the dispersal draft. The Comets folded in 1991 and Neely signed with the Baltimore Blast on August 27, 1991. The Blast folded in 1992 and Neely moved to the Baltimore Spirit of the National Professional Soccer League. He played two seasons with the Spirit. In the summer of 1993, Neely also played for the Los Angeles United in the Continental Indoor Soccer League. In 1994, he joined the Anaheim Splash of the CISL and would play for them for the next four summer seasons. On October 26, 1996, Neely returned to the Baltimore Spirit. On February 1, 1998, the New England Revolution selected Neely in the second round (seventeenth overall) of the 1998 MLS Supplemental Draft. Neely chose to pursue his MBA, electing not to report to the Revolution. The Revolution released him in the pre-season. In the fall of 1998, Neely signed with the Baltimore Blast of the NPSL and played four seasons before retiring. Neely was inducted into the Baltimore Blast Hall of Fame in 2010.

After retiring, Neely began Coastal Printing Solutions, a printing company in Newport Beach, California.
