= Mike O'Mara (politician) =

American politician and trade unionist

Member of the St. Louis County Council (4th district)
- In office 2001–2016
- Preceded by: James O'Mara

Personal details
- Party: Democratic
- Spouse: Mary Carol Svetanics
- Children: 2
- Education: St. Louis Community College-Florissant Valley; St. Louis University
- Occupation: Politician; trade unionist

Michael "Mike" O’Mara is an American, journeyman pipefitter, international representative of the United Association of Plumbers, Pipefitters and Sprinklerfitters, and Democratic member of the St. Louis County Council.

== Early life and career ==
O'Mara's father, James, was a member of the St. Louis County Council and a member and leader of the Pipefitters Local 562. O'Mara attended McCluer North High School in Florissant, Missouri, later attending to St. Louis Community College-Florissant Valley. He graduated from St. Louis University with a bachelor's degree in communications.

He was a soccer player and played for the Kansas City Comets from 1981 to 1982 and for the St. Louis Steamers from 1983 to 1984. He joined the Plumbers and Pipefitters Local 562, where he has been an assistant business manager and is currently a journeyman pipefitter and international representative of the United Association of Plumbers, Pipefitters and Sprinklerfitters. He is married with two children.

== Political career ==
O'Mara represented the fourth district in the St. Louis County Council from 2001, when his father retired from the same seat, to 2016. He represented about 145,000 people in north St. Louis County. He has been Vice-Chairman of the council since 2011 and has previously served as Chairman of the council.

== Electoral history ==
2012 St. Louis County Council 4th district general election
Party	Candidate	Votes	%	±%
Democratic	Mike O'Mara	59,690	88.86	
Libertarian	Jeff Coleman	7,345	10.93	

2008 St. Louis County Council 4th district general election
Party	Candidate	Votes	%	±%
Democratic	Mike O'Mara	58,959	81.41	
Republican	Eugene Dokes	11,716	16.18	
Libertarian	Theo "Ted" Brown, Sr.	1,702	2.35	

2004 St. Louis County Council 4th district general election
Party	Candidate	Votes	%	±%
Democratic	Mike O'Mara	61,120	100.00	

2000 St. Louis County Council 4th district general election
Party	Candidate	Votes	%	±%
Democratic	Mike O'Mara	48,180	100.00	
