= Chicago Horizons =

Defunct US indoor soccer team (1980–81)

The Chicago Horizons was a member of the original Major Indoor Soccer League (MISL) for only the 1980–81 season. It was the first of two franchises that represented Chicago in the circuit's history. It was the first professional sports team that played its home matches at the Rosemont Horizon, which also inspired the club's nickname. The team colors were orange, yellow, black and red. The head coach was Luis Dabo.

The Horizons, with a 20–20 record, finished tied for third place with the Buffalo Stallions in the Central Division and qualified for the playoffs. After a 4–3 victory in Game One of a First Round best-of-three series with the Wichita Wings, the Horizons lost the last two contests 6–4 and 8–6 and were eliminated from the postseason. Enzo Di Pede won the 'Goalkeeper of the Year' award.

All Horizons games home and away were broadcast on radio with Les Grobstein handling Play by Play and Sam Donnelly the Color.

Even though the Horizons suspended operations following the campaign, the league still wanted to revive the franchise. That ended when Lee Stern, owner of the North American Soccer League's Chicago Sting which played both indoors and outdoors at the time, paid the MISL to discontinue those plans and effectively eliminated the competition in the Chicago market. Stern was bitter about the Horizons, blaming them for costing his Sting much money.
