= St. Louis Community College–Florissant Valley =

Public college in Ferguson, Missouri, US

- Former name: Florissant Valley Community College (1971–1976)
- Type: Public community college campus
- Established: 1971; 55 years ago
- Parent institution: STLCC
- President: Patrick Mallory
- Students: 7,210
- Location: 3400 Pershall Road, Ferguson, Missouri, 63135, U.S. 38.7685°N 90.2874°W
- Campus: 108 acres (44 ha); Suburban
- Website: stlcc.edu/locations/florissant-valley

St. Louis Community College–Florissant Valley (commonly known as STLCC–Florissant Valley or simply Florissant Valley) is a public community college campus in Ferguson, Missouri. It is one of the four campuses of St. Louis Community College. Over 7,000 students attend Florissant Valley.

== Academics ==
Florissant Valley is the major Art and Theatre campus in the STLCC system. Students can get Associate in Applied Science (AAS) Degrees in Graphic Communications or Associate in Fine Arts (AFA) Degrees in General Fine Arts, Graphic Communications, Art Education and Photography. Students also have the option of starting a Bachelor of Fine Arts degree and then transferring to University of Missouri–St. Louis.

The Fischer Theatre serves as the hub of the Theatre program at FVCC.

The campus also has engineering, technology, and applied science degree programs (such as biotechnology). The most successful of which is the Chemical Technology program, a program that prepares students to work as chemical laboratory technicians and boasts a job placement rate of over 95%. As well as being known to many chemical, environmental or industrial companies in the Saint Louis area for a source of future trained employees.

== Athletics ==
STLCC operates as a single entity in athletic competition; Florissant Valley students are permitted to participate if eligible.

Florissant Valley serves as the "home field" for Men's Soccer and Women's Volleyball.

Prior to STLCC consolidating all athletic programs under one banner, STLCC–Florissant Valley (which was known as the Fury) won 13 NJCAA Championships, of which ten were in Men's Soccer.

== Notable alumni ==
- Debra Dickerson attended the college but did not take a degree.
- Kathleen Madigan attended the college but did not take a degree.
