= 1981 Portland Timbers season =

Portland Timbers
1981 season
- Owner: Louisiana-Pacific
- Head coach: (Wales) Vic Crowe
- Stadium: Civic Stadium
- NASL: Division: 3rd Playoffs: First round
- U.S. Open Cup: Did not enter
- Top goalscorer: League: (Scotland) John Bain (Canada) Dale Mitchell (11 goals); All: (Scotland) John Bain (12 goals)
- Highest home attendance: 17,318 vs. VAN (Jul 4)
- Lowest home attendance: 4,669 vs. SJE (May 6)
- Average home league attendance: League: 10,516; All: 10,834

The 1981 Portland Timbers season was the seventh season for the Portland Timbers in the now-defunct North American Soccer League.

== Squad ==
The 1981 squad

Note: Flags indicate national team as defined under FIFA eligibility rules; some limited exceptions apply. Players may hold more than one non-FIFA nationality.

No.	Pos.	Nation	Player
1	GK	SCO	Keith MacRae
2	DF	USA	Glenn Myernick
3	DF	ENG	Clive Charles
4	DF	ENG	Gary Collier
5	DF	ENG	Graham Day
6	MF	SCO	John Bain
7	FW	CAN	Dale Mitchell
8	MF	ENG	Barry Powell
9	FW	SCO	Willie Donachie
10	FW	BER	Clyde Best
11	FW	ENG	Stuart Lee

No.	Pos.	Nation	Player
12	FW	ENG	Willie Anderson
14	DF	CAN	Bruce Gant
15	MF	ENG	John Pratt
16	MF	CAN	Brian Gant
18	DF	ENG	Bernie Fagan
19	FW	SCO	Ally Brown
20	FW	USA	Mike Farebrother
21	FW	NIR	Jimmy Kelly
23	DF	KOR	Young-Jeung Cho
24	MF	USA	Chris Hellenkamp
31	GK	YUG	Dragan Radovich

== North American Soccer League ==
=== Regular season ===
==== Northwest Division standings ====
Pos	Club	Pld	W	L	GF	GA	GD	Pts
1	Vancouver Whitecaps	32	21	11	74	43	+31	186
2	Calgary Boomers	32	17	15	59	54	+5	151
3	Portland Timbers	32	17	15	52	49	+3	141
4	Seattle Sounders	32	15	17	60	62	−2	137
5	Edmonton Drillers	32	12	20	60	79	−19	123

Pld = Matches played; W = Matches won; L = Matches lost; GF = Goals for; GA = Goals against; GD = Goal difference; Pts = Points

==== League results ====
Date	Opponent	Venue	Result	Attendance	Scorers
March 28, 1981	California Surf	A	2–0	7,663	Lee, Mitchell
April 4, 1981	Seattle Sounders	A	1–2* (OT)	24,065	Pratt
April 11, 1981	Calgary Boomers	H	3–1	8,524	Mitchell (2), Anderson
April 18, 1981	Vancouver Whitecaps	H	1–2 (OT)	13,153	Lee
April 26, 1981	Calgary Boomers	A	2–1	10,114	Mitchell (2)
May 2, 1981	Tulsa Roughnecks	H	1–3	7,766	Bain
May 6, 1981	San Jose Earthquakes	H	3–0	4,669	Bain (2), Lee
May 10, 1981	Los Angeles Aztecs	A	3–1	3,306	Bain, Mitchell, Lee
May 16, 1981	Calgary Boomers	H	2–0	10,510	Mitchell, Bain
May 24, 1981	Edmonton Drillers	A	1–2	12,812	Lee
May 27, 1981	Vancouver Whitecaps	A	0–2	23,541	
June 3, 1981	Minnesota Kicks	H	1–0	8,318	Bri. Gant
June 9, 1981	Atlanta Chiefs	A	1–2	3,117	Brown
June 13, 1981	Seattle Sounders	H	2–1	15,316	o.g., Bain
June 17, 1981	Ft. Lauderdale Strikers	H	0–3	11,093	
June 20, 1981	Chicago Sting	H	2–4	12,510	Mitchell, Brown
June 23, 1981	Chicago Sting	A	1–0	9,568	Bri. Gant
June 27, 1981	Tulsa Roughnecks	A	1*–0 (OT)	19,232	
June 30, 1981	Edmonton Drillers	A	1–2	7,892	Mitchell
July 4, 1981	Vancouver Whitecaps	H	2–3 (OT)	17,318	Mitchell, Donachie
July 8, 1981	Washington Diplomats	H	2–1	8,155	Brown, Lee
July 11, 1981	Minnesota Kicks	A	3*–2 (OT)	15,302	Bain, Brown
July 15, 1981	Dallas Tornado	A	0–1	2,905	
July 18, 1981	California Surf	H	2–3 (OT)	9,134	Powell, Anderson
July 22, 1981	San Diego Sockers	A	1–3	10,268	Bain
July 25, 1981	San Diego Sockers	H	0–2	8,493	
July 29, 1981	New York Cosmos	A	0–2	28,640	
August 1, 1981	San Jose Earthquakes	A	2*–1 (OT)	11,166	Brown
August 5, 1981	Edmonton Drillers	H	3–1	8,423	Cho, Bain, Brown
August 8, 1981	Dallas Tornado	H	5–2	8,954	Bain, Brown (2), Cho, Mitchell
August 15, 1981	Seattle Sounders	A	2–1 (OT)	16,747	o.g., Powell
August 19, 1981	Los Angeles Aztecs	H	2–1	15,923	Brown, Bain

* = Shootout win

=== Postseason ===
==== Playoff bracket ====
Best of 3 series

First Round
Portland Timbers	2	1	0
San Diego Sockers	1	5	2
Jacksonville Tea Men	3	2	—
Atlanta Chiefs	2	1	—
Seattle Sounders	2	2	2
Chicago Sting	3	0	3
Montreal Manic	5	2	2
Los Angeles Aztecs	3	3	1

Quarterfinals
San Diego Sockers	1	2	3
Jacksonville Tea Men	2	1	1
Chicago Sting	2	4	4
Montreal Manic	3	2	2

Semifinals
San Diego Sockers	2	1	0
Chicago Sting	1	2	1

==== Playoff results ====
Date	Opponent	Venue	Result	Attendance	Scorers
August 22, 1981	San Diego Sockers	H	2–1	15,923	Brown, Bain
August 26, 1981	San Diego Sockers	A	1–5	12,039	Day
August 30, 1981	San Diego Sockers	A	0–2	15,244	
