= 1980 Portland Timbers season =

Portland Timbers
1980 season
- Owner: Louisiana-Pacific
- Head coach: (England) Don Megson (to May 28) (England) Peter Warner (interim; from May 31 to June 14) (Wales) Vic Crowe (from June 21)
- Stadium: Civic Stadium
- NASL: Division: 4th Playoffs: Did not qualify
- U.S. Open Cup: Did not enter
- Top goalscorer: (Bermuda) Clyde Best (11 goals)
- Highest home attendance: 16,095 vs. LAA (Aug 20)
- Lowest home attendance: 8,108 vs. WAS (Jul 2)
- Average home league attendance: 10,210

The 1980 Portland Timbers season was the sixth season for the Portland Timbers in the now-defunct North American Soccer League.

== Squad ==
The 1980 squad

Note: Flags indicate national team as defined under FIFA eligibility rules; some limited exceptions apply. Players may hold more than one non-FIFA nationality.

No.	Pos.	Nation	Player
00	GK	ENG	Mick Poole
1	GK	USA	John Benbow
2	DF	USA	Glenn Myernick
3	DF	ENG	Clive Charles
4	DF	ENG	Gary Collier
5	DF	ENG	Graham Day
6	MF	SCO	John Bain
7	FW	CAN	Dale Mitchell
8	MF	IRL	Jimmy Conway
9	FW	SCO	Willie Donachie
10	FW	BER	Clyde Best

No.	Pos.	Nation	Player
11	FW	ENG	Stuart Lee
12	FW	ENG	Willie Anderson
13	DF	CAN	Garry Ayre
14	DF	CAN	Bruce Gant
15	MF	ENG	John Pratt
16	MF	CAN	Brian Gant
17	FW	USA	Mike Flater
18	DF	ENG	Bernie Fagan
19	FW	NED	Rob Rensenbrink
22	GK	USA	Jim Gorsek

== North American Soccer League ==
=== National Conference, Western Division standings ===
Pos	Club	Pld	W	L	GF	GA	GD	Pts
1	Seattle Sounders	32	25	7	74	31	+43	207
2	Los Angeles Aztecs	32	20	12	61	52	+9	174
3	Vancouver Whitecaps	32	16	16	52	47	+5	139
4	Portland Timbers	32	15	17	50	53	−3	133

Pld = Matches played; W = Matches won; L = Matches lost; GF = Goals for; GA = Goals against; GD = Goal difference; Pts = Points

=== League results ===
Date	Opponent	Venue	Result	Attendance	Scorers
April 12, 1980	Los Angeles Aztecs	A	0–1	3,120	
April 19, 1980	California Surf	A	1–5	10,504	Best
April 26, 1980	Detroit Express	H	2–1	14,595	Conway, Mitchell
April 30, 1980	Seattle Sounders	A	0–1	12,278	
May 3, 1980	Tampa Bay Rowdies	H	0–1	13,615	
May 11, 1980	Washington Diplomats	A	4–2	10,634	Mitchell (2), Rensenbrink (2)
May 14, 1980	Minnesota Kicks	A	1–2* (OT)	10,851	Pratt
May 21, 1980	Edmonton Drillers	A	2–1	6,520	Bain, Lee
May 24, 1980	San Jose Earthquakes	H	2–1	9,674	Mitchell, Lee
May 28, 1980	California Surf	H	1–3	8,948	Best
May 31, 1980	Ft. Lauderdale Strikers	A	2–4	12,302	Best, Rensenbrink
June 4, 1980	Atlanta Chiefs	A	1–2	2,368	Rensenbrink
June 7, 1980	Rochester Lancers	H	0–1	8,806	
June 11, 1980	San Diego Sockers	A	0–1	7,958	
June 14, 1980	Seattle Sounders	H	0–1* (OT)	10,131	
June 21, 1980	Atlanta Chiefs	H	1–0	9,950	Bri. Gant
June 24, 1980	Dallas Tornado	H	0–1* (OT)	8,619	
July 2, 1980	Washington Diplomats	H	2–1	8,108	Rensenbrink (2)
July 6, 1980	New York Cosmos	A	1–4	41,260	Anderson
July 9, 1980	Rochester Lancers	A	0–2	7,204	
July 12, 1980	San Diego Sockers	H	1–0	8,895	Best
July 16, 1980	Dallas Tornado	A	3*–2 (OT)	4,454	Lee (2)
July 19, 1980	Houston Hurricane	H	0–1 (OT)	11,083	
July 26, 1980	Vancouver Whitecaps	H	5–1	8,877	Bain (3), Best (2)
July 29, 1980	Toronto Blizzard	H	2–1	9,233	Lee (2)
August 2, 1980	New England Tea Men	A	1–2 (OT)	7,214	Conway
August 5, 1980	Memphis Rogues	A	1–2	7,090	Mitchell
August 9, 1980	Tulsa Roughnecks	H	4–2	8,433	Bain (2), Mitchell, Lee
August 13, 1980	Edmonton Drillers	H	4–1	8,298	Mitchell, Anderson, Lee, Best
August 16, 1980	San Jose Earthquakes	A	3–2	14,287	Bain, Mitchell, Best
August 20, 1980	Los Angeles Aztecs	H	3*–2 (OT)	16,095	Donachie, Best
August 23, 1980	Vancouver Whitecaps	A	3–2	32,301	Mitchell, Best (2)

* = Shootout win
