= Portland Timbers–Vancouver Whitecaps rivalry =

North American soccer rivalry

- Other names: Cascadia Cup; Port-Couver
- Location: Pacific Northwest
- Teams: Portland Timbers; Vancouver Whitecaps FC
- First meeting: May 16, 1975; NASL; Portland 2–0 Vancouver
- Latest meeting: April 4, 2026; MLS regular season Vancouver 3–2 Portland

Statistics
- Total meetings: 131
- Most wins: Vancouver (56)
- All-time series: Vancouver 56–51–24 (W–L–T) Portland
- Largest victory: Portland 5–0 Vancouver (NASL; May 2, 1982); Vancouver 5–0 Portland (MLS Cup playoffs; October 23, 2024)

The Portland Timbers–Vancouver Whitecaps rivalry is a soccer rivalry between the Portland Timbers and Vancouver Whitecaps FC, both based in the Cascadia region of the United States and Canada. The rivalry originated in the North American Soccer League of the 1970s, and later carried into successor leagues through the 1980s and the 2000s, including the A-League and USL First Division, with both cities reviving expansion teams. The rivalry moved to Major League Soccer, the top division of soccer in the United States, in 2011, where it has grown into one of the largest in North American soccer.

The two clubs are part of the Cascadia Cup, the trophy and competition created in 2004 by supporters of the Portland Timbers, Vancouver Whitecaps, and the Seattle Sounders which is awarded each season to the best top-flight soccer team in the Cascadia region. Vancouver won the inaugural Cup, defeating Portland three times in 2004. The Timbers and Whitecaps have antagonistic roots dating to the days of the original North American Soccer League beginning in 1975. The rivalry regained steam as Portland and Vancouver clashed in crucial, and often physical matches during the late 2000s, with the clubs facing each other in memorable playoff duels in 2007, 2009, and 2010. The two clubs played for the 100th time in 2017, and the rivalry is one of the most-played in US soccer history.

In the first decade of the two clubs playing in Major League Soccer together, Portland and Vancouver have a friendlier rivalry than that of other match-ups in the Cascadia Cup, such as Portland and Seattle. One reason for the less-intense rivalry for the time being could be simple geography (Portland is closer to Seattle than Vancouver) or Vancouver not attaining a similar level of sustained MLS success as the two other Cascadia clubs. However, individual matches between the sides have been just as intense as any rivalry in the league, such as when Portland defeated Vancouver in a brutal two-game playoff series on their way to winning the 2015 MLS Cup. Additionally, many Whitecap players point to the Timbers being their biggest rival.

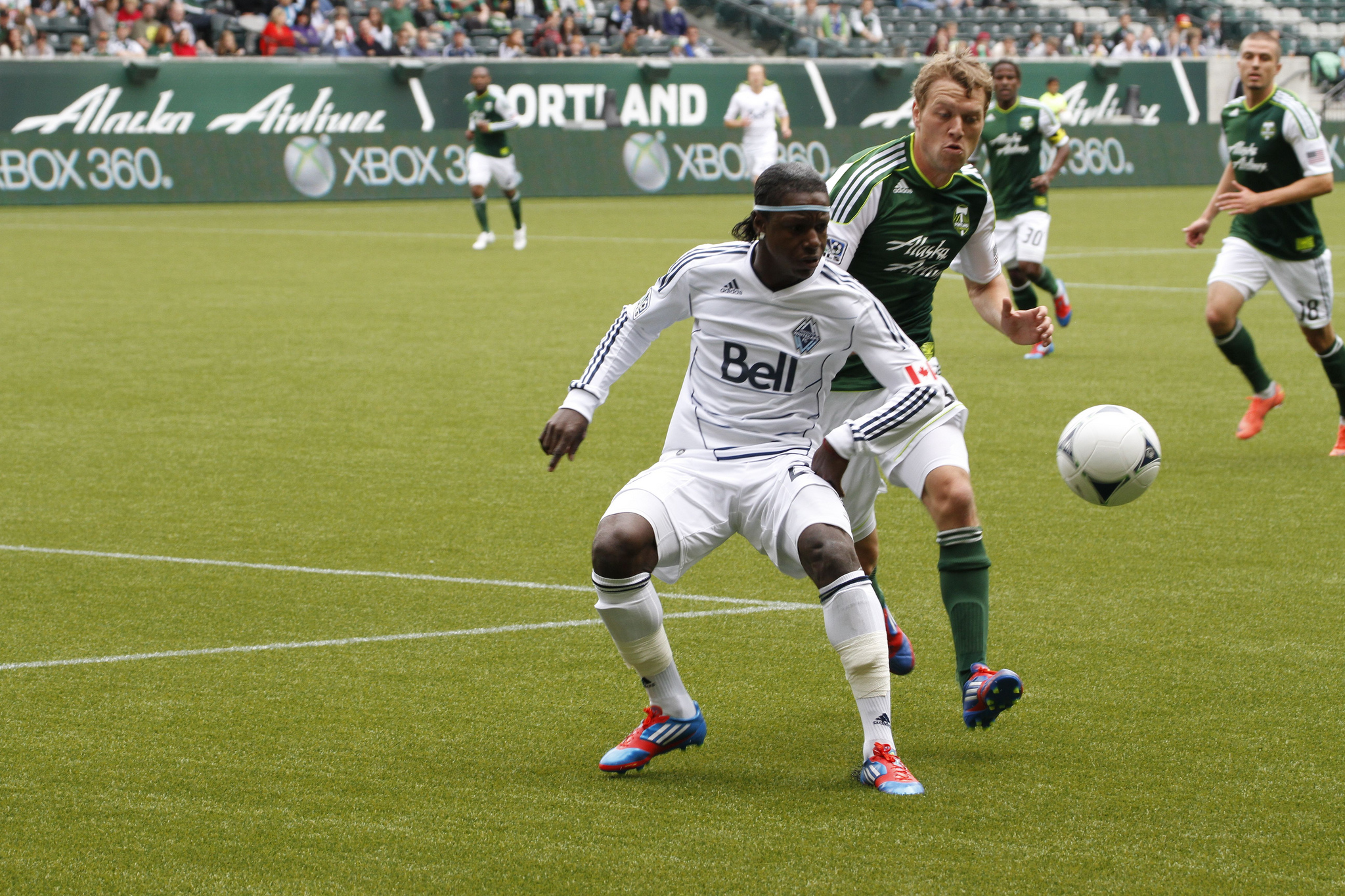
Vancouver Whitecaps forward Darren Mattocks defends Portland midfielder Freddie Braun in an MLS game between the clubs on May 26, 2012

== History ==
=== Statistics ===
As of April 4, 2026

Competition	Matches	Wins		Draws
Competition	Matches	Portland	Vancouver	Draws
NASL (1975–1982)	19	9	10	0
NASL indoor(1981–1982)	3	1	2	0
WSA/WSL (1987–1990)	1	0	1	0
A-League/USL-1 (2001–2010)	39	11	18	10
MLS (2011–present)	41	17	15	9
League totals – regular season	103	38	46	19
NASL playoffs	2	2	0	0
A-League/USL-1 playoffs	8	2	5	1
MLS playoffs	3	1	1	1
League totals – Playoffs	13	5	6	2
Friendlies (all formats)	15	8	4	3
All-time totals	131	51	56	24

=== NASL era (1975–1982) ===
The original Vancouver Whitecaps were founded in December 1973 and began to play in the North American Soccer League (NASL) in 1974. Portland was subsequently granted an expansion team the next year, the Timbers, and in 1975 the clubs played their first match against each other, with Portland winning 2–0 in the initial game on May 16, 1975.

Both the Timbers and the Whitecaps achieved success in the beginning years of the league, with Portland winning the regular season title in 1975 and making the Soccer Bowl while Vancouver won the championship in 1979. Due to the success of both teams and the natural proximity of the two towns, Portland and Vancouver developed a rivalry.

The rivalry got off to an auspicious start, with Portland winning the first six games. However Vancouver came straight back, winning the next five and only losing three additional times to the Timbers during the duration of NASL play.

In 1978, Vancouver was the top-ranked club in the league heading into the playoffs, with a record of 24–6. They won their first round game but were upset by the Timbers in the playoffs, who won both games en route to a 3–1 aggregate goal margin. Clyde Best scored in both games in the first playoff confrontation between the teams.

Portland folded its team at the end of the 1982 season, as player salaries outpaced team revenue. The original Vancouver Whitecaps also folded along with the NASL in 1984.

==== NASL indoor (1981–82) ====
During the 1981–82 NASL indoor season the Whitecaps and Timbers played one another three times. On December 15, 1981, before 2,262 fans at the PNE Agrodome the two clubs squared off for the first time in indoor soccer, with Vancouver claiming victory at home, 5-4. They would split the other two meetings, both at Portland’s Memorial Coliseum giving the Whitecaps the edge in the season series.

=== WSL/WSA era (1987–1990) ===
Portland regained a soccer club in 1985 with the formation of F.C. Portland, who joined the Western Alliance Challenge Series. In 1986, Portland joined the Western Soccer Alliance, while at the same time the Vancouver franchise was reborn in the Canadian Soccer League (CSL), where they were immediately successful. The two clubs began to play matches against each other in 1987–with F.C. Portland becoming the second side to take the Timbers name in 1989–and continued until Portland folded in 1990.

=== USL era (2001–2010) ===
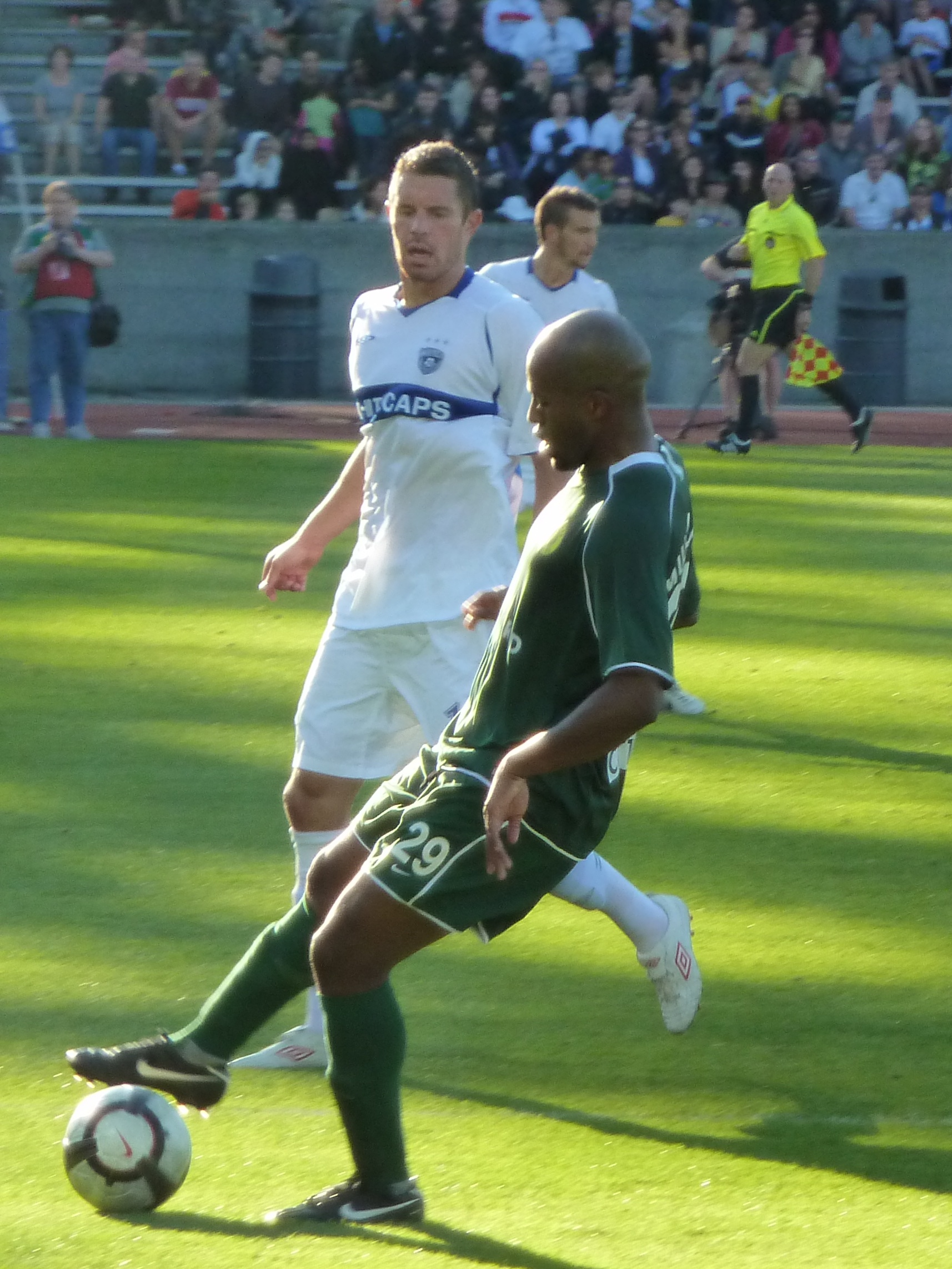
Timbers forward Ibad Muhamadu in a game against Vancouver, October 2, 2010

In 2001, the third incarnation of the Portland Timbers was established and the club joined the USL First Division (USL-1), which already contained the Vancouver Whitecaps. The first game between the rivals in over a decade came on June 13, 2001, with Portland's Vadim Tolstolutsky scoring in the 90th minute to salvage a tie for the Timbers after neither side scored in extra time.

In the first playoff series between the two clubs in 24 years, Portland and Vancouver faced off in the first round of the 2002 A-League playoffs. Vancouver won both games 1-0 to advance to the next round.

In 2004, fan-based organizations supporting the Portland Timbers and Vancouver Whitecaps as well as the Seattle Sounders sponsored the creation of a two-foot-tall silver cup to be awarded annually to the club that finishes with the best record in the season series between the three rivals.

The Whitecaps dominated the series during the mid-2000s, not losing to the Timbers in league play for over 3 years between May 2004 and July 2007.

The Portland-Vancouver rivalry reached new heights near the end of the 2000s after Portland knocked Vancouver out of the USL playoffs in 2007, only for the Whitecaps to return the favor twice, delivering a death blow to the Timbers' postseason runs in both 2009 and 2010. In the 2009 season, Portland was the top-ranked club in the league but fell to Vancouver in a dramatic two-game series that the Whitecaps won 5-4 on aggregate.

Portland fell behind defending champions Vancouver in the first game of the 2007 USL playoff opening round 1-0. However, on the return leg, the Timbers ran right through the Whitecaps, advancing with a 3-0 win and a 3-1 total goal advantage on aggregate. This was the first time Portland had advanced past the first round of the A-League or USL playoffs, in what was described as "an intense and offensive contest between the Northwest rivals".

In 2009 and 2010, supporters of the Timbers and Whitecaps decided to continue the Cascadia Cup without the Sounders while playing in the USL, after Seattle moved to Major League Soccer in 2009. Timbers and Whitecaps supporters voted to only included regular season USL-1 matches played between the teams and Portland won the cup for the first time.

Portland and Vancouver faced each other once again in the 2009 USL playoffs, this time in the second round. Portland was the top overall team in the league in 2009, compiling a 16-4-10 W-L-D record, while Vancouver was the lowest-seeded team to make the playoffs. Vancouver won the first game of the two-game playoff series 2-1 at Swangard Stadium in Burnaby, BC, meaning that the Timbers would need to win at home in order to advance. Portland nearly fought back to equalize overall but second-half goals from Martin Nash and Marlon James forced a 3-3 tie at PGE Park, and the Timbers never scored again, giving Vancouver the win 5-4 on goal aggregate.

In 2010, the final year of both clubs playing in USL, they met again in the playoffs, this time in the first round with Portland as the 4th seed and Vancouver as the 5th seed. On October 7, 2010, in the first leg of the matchup, Gershon Koffie scored in the first minute and Martin Nash added a 13th-minute strike to give the Whitecaps a 2-0 win at Swangard Stadium. Three days later, on the return leg in Portland, James Marcelin scored for the Timbers in the 49th minute, but Portland was not able to find the equalizer, and Vancouver advanced to the next round with a 2-1 aggregate win, their second straight season eliminating Portland in the playoffs.

=== MLS era (2011–present) ===
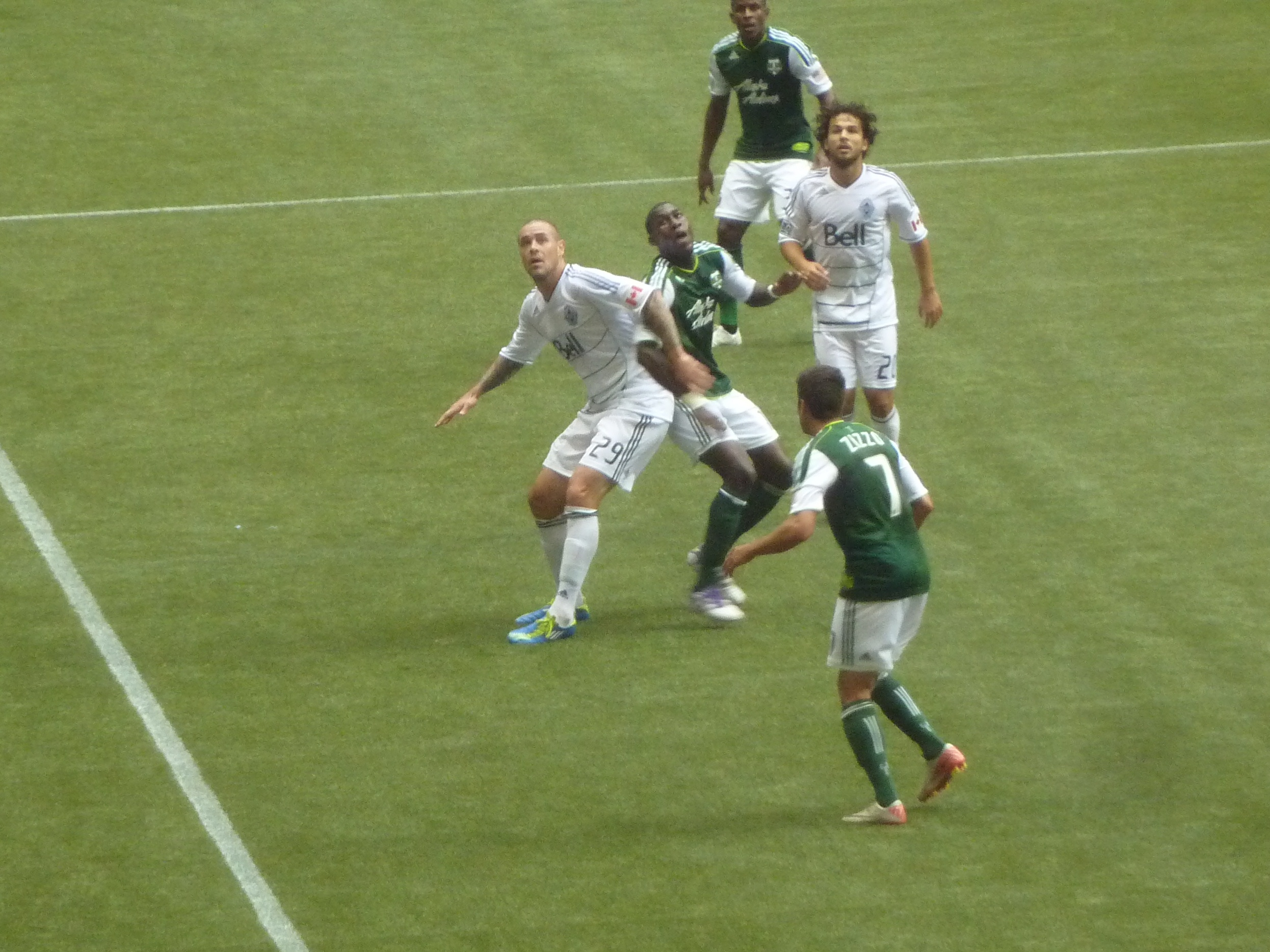
Timbers and Whitecaps players face off during the first MLS game in Vancouver between the franchises at BC Place, October 2, 2011

The Vancouver franchise was granted status on March 18, 2009 by MLS Commissioner Don Garber as the seventeenth franchise of Major League Soccer. The Portland Timbers were announced as the eighteenth franchise two days later, and the two Cascadia clubs joined MLS together for the 2011 MLS season. The Timbers won the initial MLS game against the Whitecaps, and it would take until 2014 for Vancouver to first win against Portland.

The two clubs met for the first time in the MLS Playoffs in a two game aggregate series in the 2015 Western Conference Semifinals. After the first game tied 0-0 at Portland's Providence Park, the Timbers won the return match at BC Place 2-0 on goals by Fanendo Adi and Diego Chara, advancing to the Western Conference Finals. The Timbers would later win the 2015 MLS Cup, becoming the first team from Cascadia to do so.

On August 10, 2019, Portland defeated the Whitecaps 3–1, placing them first in Cascadia Cup standings. Goals were scored by Sebastián Blanco, Marvin Loría, and Jeremy Ebobisse.

Due to the COVID-19 disruption of MLS play as well as cross-border restrictions imposed by the Canadian government, Vancouver played the entirety of their 2020 home matches against American teams at Portland's Providence Park in a way to easier facilitate travel accommodations. The first "home" match for Vancouver coincidentally was against the Timbers, who played as the away side in their own park. Portland won 1-0, scoring an official away goal by Felipe Mora in the 5th minute.

In 2021, Vancouver continued to play in the United States, but at Real Salt Lake's own Rio Tinto Stadium given the continuing cross-border travel restrictions that continues to prevent Vancouver from playing their home matches in Canada. Vancouver played as the home team against Portland on April 18, 2021 in Rio Tinto Stadium where they won the match 1–0.

In 2024, the teams met in the Wild card round of the MLS Playoffs. The Whitecaps won the Wild card match 5–0, with Ryan Gauld scoring a hat-trick. The Whitecaps advanced to Round One but were defeated by Los Angeles FC.

==== MLS honours ====
As of October 1, 2025

Portland	Competition	Vancouver
Domestic
1	MLS Cup	—
—	Supporters' Shield	—
—	U.S. Open Cup / Canadian Championship	5
1	Aggregate	5
Continental and Worldwide
—	CONCACAF Champions League	—
—	Leagues Cup	—
—	Campeones Cup	—
0	Aggregate	0
1	Total aggregate	5

== Supporter groups ==
Both clubs have a strong history of supporter groups that connect and promote the rivalry. Portland's supporting group is the Timbers Army while Vancouver's is the Vancouver Southsiders. The two groups, along with the Emerald City Supporters of Seattle, jointly created the Cascadia Cup in 2004.

Members of the supporting groups between the two clubs even jointly celebrated together after Vancouver eliminated Portland from the 2010 USL Playoffs due to the shared move to MLS the next year.

== Results ==
Home team is listed on the left, away team is listed on the right. Home team's score is listed first.

Timbers win Whitecaps win Draw

=== League ===
==== North American Soccer League (1975–1982) ====
May 16, 1975 NASL	Vancouver Whitecaps	0–2	Portland Timbers	Empire Stadium
			Barry Powell; Tony Betts	Attendance: 7,815

June 7, 1975 NASL	Portland Timbers	3–2 (a.e.t.)	Vancouver Whitecaps	Civic Stadium
	Graham Day; Brian Godfrey; Barry Powell			Attendance: 11,335

July 3, 1975 NASL	Portland Timbers	2–1	Vancouver Whitecaps	Civic Stadium
	Chris Dangerfield; Tony Betts			Attendance: 18,278

April 16, 1976 NASL	Vancouver Whitecaps	2–3 (a.e.t.)	Portland Timbers	Empire Stadium
	(o.g.); Gary Thompson		Tony Betts; Ike MacKay	Attendance: 11,352

July 18, 1976 NASL	Portland Timbers	2–1	Vancouver Whitecaps	Civic Stadium
	Neil Rioch; Tony Betts			Attendance: 17,456

April 8, 1977 NASL	Vancouver Whitecaps	0–1	Portland Timbers	Empire Stadium
	Stewart Scullion			Attendance: 10,519

August 7, 1977 NASL	Portland Timbers	0–2	Vancouver Whitecaps	Civic Stadium
				Attendance: 11,094

May 7, 1978 NASL	Vancouver Whitecaps	1–0	Portland Timbers	Empire Stadium
				Attendance: 13,155

July 21, 1978 NASL	Portland Timbers	0–2	Vancouver Whitecaps	Civic Stadium
				Attendance: 23,536

April 21, 1979 NASL	Vancouver Whitecaps	2–1	Portland Timbers	Empire Stadium
			Clyde Best	Attendance: 23,137

July 28, 1979 NASL	Portland Timbers	2–3 (a.e.t.)	Vancouver Whitecaps	Civic Stadium
	Dale Mitchell; Dale Mitchell			Attendance: 12,727

July 26, 1980 NASL	Portland Timbers	5–1	Vancouver Whitecaps	Civic Stadium
	John Bain; John Bain; John Bain; Clyde Best; Clyde Best			Attendance: 8,877

August 23, 1980 NASL	Vancouver Whitecaps	2–3	Portland Timbers	Empire Stadium
			Dale Mitchell; Clyde Best; Clyde Best	Attendance: 32,301

April 18, 1981 NASL	Portland Timbers	1–2 (a.e.t.)	Vancouver Whitecaps	Civic Stadium
	Stuart Lee			Attendance: 13,153

May 27, 1981 NASL	Vancouver Whitecaps	2–0	Portland Timbers	Empire Stadium
				Attendance: 23,541

July 4, 1981 NASL	Portland Timbers	2–3 (a.e.t.)	Vancouver Whitecaps	Civic Stadium
	Dale Mitchell; William Donachie			Attendance: 17,318

April 24, 1982 NASL	Vancouver Whitecaps	2–1	Portland Timbers	Empire Stadium
			Ronald Futcher	Attendance: 18,346

May 2, 1982 NASL	Portland Timbers	5–0	Vancouver Whitecaps	Civic Stadium
	Willie Anderson; Dale Mitchell; Ronald Futcher; Ronald Futcher; Ronald Futcher			Attendance: 14,144

May 29, 1982 NASL	Vancouver Whitecaps	1–0	Portland Timbers	Empire Stadium
				Attendance: 17,721

==== North American Soccer League (1981–1982) indoor ====
December 15, 1981 NASL indoor	Vancouver Whitecaps	5–4	Portland Timbers	PNE Agrodome
7:30 pm (PST)	Yorath (4:23); Gray; Olsson; Valentine; Gray (53:51)	Report	Mitchell (19:46); Lee; Bain; Gant	Attendance: 2,262; Referee: Goldman

January 4, 1982 NASL indoor	Portland Timbers	5–6 (a.e.t.)	Vancouver Whitecaps	Memorial Coliseum
7:00 pm (PST)	Lee (8:22); Mitchell; Anderson (30:22); Fagan (44:08); Cho (45:18)	Report	Palmér (14:50); Valentine (27:24); Gray (38:48); Lenarduzzi (44:18); Nikeas (45:45); Valentine 61:14' (Yorath)	Attendance: 3,674; Referee: Klaus Kretschmer

January 23, 1982 NASL indoor	Portland Timbers	3–1	Vancouver Whitecaps	Memorial Coliseum
7:00 pm (PST)	Nelson (24:16); Bain (40:23); Gant (58:26)	Report	Olsson (37:57)	Attendance: 6,820; Referee: Manuel Ortiz, Sr.

==== WSL/WSA (1987–1990) ====
May 28, 1988 WSA	Portland Timbers	1–2	Vancouver Whitecaps	Civic Stadium
	Benedetti 45'	Report	Lowther 77' (pen.); Jaskins 82'	Attendance: 350

==== A-League (2001–05) ====
June 13, 2001 A-League	Portland Timbers	1–1 (a.e.t.)	Vancouver Whitecaps	PGE Park
	Tolstolutsky 90'	Report	St. Louis 73'; Gbeke (red card) 108'	Attendance: 4,077

June 29, 2001 A-League	Portland Timbers	0–1	Vancouver Whitecaps	PGE Park
		Report	Valente 62'	Attendance: 6,013

July 15, 2001 A-League	Vancouver Whitecaps	4–0	Portland Timbers	Swangard Stadium
	Kindel 16'; Jordan 42'; Heald 56' (pen.); Sulentic 88'	Report		Attendance: 4,062

August 10, 2001 A-League	Vancouver Whitecaps	3–1	Portland Timbers	Swangard Stadium
	Jordan 13'; Morris 69'; Kindel 89'	Report	Howes 29'	Attendance: 6,118

June 8, 2002 A-League	Portland Timbers	3–1	Vancouver Whitecaps	PGE Park
	Afash 10'; Howes 57', 60'	Report	Kindel 46'	Attendance: 4,914; Referee: Dean Ajir (USA)

June 9, 2002 A-League	Vancouver Whitecaps	1–0 (a.e.t.)	Portland Timbers	Swangard Stadium
	Jordan 100'	Report		Attendance: 4,037

August 10, 2002 A-League	Portland Timbers	3–2	Vancouver Whitecaps	PGE Park
	Tennyson 31', 90'; Howes 35'	Report	Jordan 44', 78'	Attendance: 4,860; Referee: Jason Transtrun (USA)

September 1, 2002 A-League	Vancouver Whitecaps	3–1	Portland Timbers	Swangard Stadium
	Clarke 35', 63'; Dailly 37'	Report	Adair 22'	Attendance: 3,712; Referee: Mauricio Navarro (Canada)

May 11, 2003 A-League	Vancouver Whitecaps	2–1	Portland Timbers	Swangard Stadium
	Jordan 11'; Morris 65'	Report	Afash 54'	Attendance: 4,124; Referee: Bruce Primeau (Canada)

May 29, 2003 A-League	Portland Timbers	1–0	Vancouver Whitecaps	PGE Park
	Alvarez 74'	Report		Attendance: 4,817; Referee: Calin Znamirovschi (USA)

June 12, 2003 A-League	Portland Timbers	2–1 (a.e.t.)	Vancouver Whitecaps	PGE Park
	Alvarez 9'; Tennyson 95'	Report	Heald 60'	Attendance: 5,471; Referee: Brian Hall (USA)

July 1, 2003 A-League	Vancouver Whitecaps	1–0	Portland Timbers	Swangard Stadium
19:00 (PDT)	Dailly 90'	Report		Attendance: 3,119; Referee: Arnar Bernhardsson (Canada)

July 3, 2003 A-League	Portland Timbers	3–0	Vancouver Whitecaps	PGE Park
19:00 (PDT)	Alvarez 72', 81', 90'	Report		Attendance: 6,619; Referee: David Simon (USA)

August 17, 2003 A-League	Vancouver Whitecaps	1–1 (a.e.t.)	Portland Timbers	Swangard Stadium
19:00 (PDT)	Valente 61'	Report	Sagare 47'; Benedetti (red card) 81'	Attendance: 5,113; Referee: Bruce Primeau (Canada)

May 23, 2004 A-League	Vancouver Whitecaps	1–3	Portland Timbers	Swangard Stadium
19:00 (PDT)	Xausa 29'	Report	Gordon 34', 65'; Alcaraz-Cuellar 41'	Attendance: 4,954; Referee: Jean-François Corrivault (Canada)

June 12, 2004 A-League	Portland Timbers	0–1 (a.e.t.)	Vancouver Whitecaps	PGE Park
19:00 (PDT)		Report	Griffiths 95'	Attendance: 5,093; Referee: Kari Seitz (USA)

July 2, 2004 A-League	Portland Timbers	0–2	Vancouver Whitecaps	PGE Park
19:00 (PDT)		Report	Sulentic 10'; Jordan 68'	Attendance: 6,007; Referee: Yader Reyes (USA)

July 16, 2004 A-League	Vancouver Whitecaps	1–0	Portland Timbers	Swangard Stadium
19:00 (PDT)	Nash 56'	Report		Attendance: 4,492; Referee: Mark Budda (Canada)

==== USL (2005–2010) ====
June 10, 2005 USL-1	Vancouver Whitecaps	3–2	Portland Timbers	Swangard Stadium
19:00 (PDT)	Valente 39' (pen.); Nash 40'; Klein 90+'	Report	Poltl 78'; Miranda 90'+	Attendance: 5,337 (SO); Referee: Steve DePiero (Canada)

July 2, 2005 USL-1	Portland Timbers	1–1	Vancouver Whitecaps	PGE Park
19:00 (PDT)	Alvarez 7'; Poltl (red card) 22'	Report	Jordan 37'	Attendance: 3,944; Referee: Kari Seitz (United States)

July 9, 2005 USL-1	Vancouver Whitecaps	4–0	Portland Timbers	Apple Bowl
19:00 (PDT)	Clarke 34'; Klein 36', 82'; Gjertsen 39'	Report		Attendance: 2,440; Referee: Dave Gantar (Canada)

July 14, 2005 USL-1	Portland Timbers	1–1	Vancouver Whitecaps	PGE Park
19:00 (PDT)	Thompson 31'	Report	Klein 89'	Attendance: 5,523; Referee: Kari Seitz (United States)

April 22, 2006 USL-1	Vancouver Whitecaps	1–0	Portland Timbers	Swangard Stadium
19:00 (PDT)	Gjertsen 17'	Report		Attendance: 5,722 (SO); Referee: Steve DePiero (Canada)

May 1, 2006 USL-1	Portland Timbers	1–1	Vancouver Whitecaps	PGE Park
19:00 (PDT)	Bartlomé 21'	Report	Donatelli 53'	Attendance: 5,448; Referee: Colin Arblaster (USA)

June 10, 2006 USL-1	Portland Timbers	0–0	Vancouver Whitecaps	PGE Park
19:00 (PDT)		Report		Attendance: 6,298; Referee: Fotis Bazakos (USA)

June 30, 2006 USL-1	Vancouver Whitecaps	3–0	Portland Timbers	Swangard Stadium
19:00 (PDT)	Testo 9', 63'; Donatelli 66'	Report		Attendance: 4,540; Referee: Carol Anne Chenard (Canada)

July 19, 2007 USL-1	Portland Timbers	2–1	Vancouver Whitecaps	PGE Park
19:00 (PDT)	Gregor 29'; Olum 52'	Report	Nash 18'	Attendance: 7,123; Referee: Collin Arblaster (USA)

August 11, 2007 USL-1	Portland Timbers	0–0	Vancouver Whitecaps	PGE Park
19:00 (PDT)		Report	Kindel (red card) 26'	Attendance: 8,652; Referee: Ian Anderson (USA)

September 9, 2007 USL-1	Vancouver Whitecaps	0–0	Portland Timbers	Swangard Stadium
19:00 (PDT)		Report		Attendance: 5,389 (SO); Referee: Silviu Petrescu (Canada)

May 24, 2008 USL-1	Portland Timbers	0–1	Vancouver Whitecaps	PGE Park
19:00 (PDT)		Report	Arze 60'	Attendance: 8,688; Referee: Yader Reyes (USA)

June 7, 2008 USL-1	Vancouver Whitecaps	3–1	Portland Timbers	Swangard Stadium
19:00 (PDT)	Sebrango 54'; Nash 66'; Valente 90'	Report	S. Thompson 9'	Attendance: 5,288 (SO); Referee: Jonathan Lavergne (Canada)

August 22, 2008 USL-1	Vancouver Whitecaps	2–1	Portland Timbers	Swangard Stadium
19:00 (PDT)	Addlery 3', 43'	Report	Olum 12'	Attendance: 4,761; Referee: Mathieu Bourdeau (Canada)

April 25, 2009 USL-1	Vancouver Whitecaps	1–0	Portland Timbers	Swangard Stadium
19:00 (PDT)	Nash 63'	Report		Attendance: 5,102; Referee: Mathieu Bourdeau

May 30, 2009 USL-1	Portland Timbers	2–0	Vancouver Whitecaps	PGE Park
19:00 (PDT)	Pore 6' (pen.); Josten 41'	Report		Attendance: 9,081; Referee: Hidajet Tica

August 6, 2009 USL-1	Portland Timbers	1–0	Vancouver Whitecaps	PGE Park
19:00 (PDT)	Pore 30'	Report		Attendance: 10,786; Referee: Landis Wiley

April 29, 2010 D-2	Portland Timbers	2–1	Vancouver Whitecaps	PGE Park
19:00 (PDT)	Pore 7', 86'; Danso (red card) 85'	Report	Akwari 11'	Attendance: 5,808

July 3, 2010 D-2	Portland Timbers	0–0	Vancouver Whitecaps	PGE Park
19:00 (PDT)		Report		Attendance: 9,017

July 22, 2010 D-2	Vancouver Whitecaps	1–2	Portland Timbers	Swangard Stadium
19:30 PDT	Khalfan 51'; Janicki (red card) 65'	Report	Pore 66' (pen.); Danso 72'	Attendance: 5,387 (SO)

October 2, 2010 D-2	Vancouver Whitecaps	2–2	Portland Timbers	Swangard Stadium
16:00 PDT	Dunfield 27'; Arnoux 68'	Report	Alhassan 46'; Dike 56'	Attendance: 5,435 (SO)

==== Major League Soccer (2011–present) ====
August 20, 2011 MLS	Portland Timbers	2–1	Vancouver Whitecaps FC	Jeld-Wen Field
19:00 PDT	Chará 2'; Perlaza 33'	Report	Sanvezzo 88'	Attendance: 18,627; Referee: Jair Marrufo (USA)

October 2, 2011 MLS	Vancouver Whitecaps FC	0–1	Portland Timbers	BC Place
13:30 PDT		Report	Cooper 25'	Attendance: 21,000; Referee: Mark Geiger (USA)

May 26, 2012 MLS	Portland Timbers	1–1	Vancouver Whitecaps FC	Jeld-Wen Field
19:00 (PDT)	Boyd 67'	Summary	Mattocks 84'	Attendance: 20,438; Referee: Jorge Gonzalez (USA)

August 25, 2012 MLS	Portland Timbers	2–1	Vancouver Whitecaps FC	Jeld-Wen Field
19:30 (PDT)	Nagbe 41'; Songo'o 55'	Summary	Miller 45+2'	Attendance: 20,438; Referee: Geoff Gamble (Canada)

October 21, 2012 MLS	Vancouver Whitecaps FC	0–1	Portland Timbers	BC Place
16:00 (PDT)		Summary	Jewsbury 39'	Attendance: 21,000; Referee: Juan Guzmán (USA)

May 18, 2013 MLS	Vancouver Whitecaps FC	2–2	Portland Timbers	BC Place
16:00(PDT)	Sanvezzo 24'; Koffie 54'	Report	W. Johnson 52' (pen.); Valencia 84'	Attendance: 19,823; Referee: Matthew Foerster

August 3, 2013 MLS	Portland Timbers	1–1	Vancouver Whitecaps FC	Jeld-Wen Field
20:00(PDT)	R. Johnson 49'	Report	Harvey 69'	Attendance: 20,674; Referee: Silviu Petrescu

October 6, 2013 MLS	Vancouver Whitecaps FC	2–2	Portland Timbers	BC Place
17:00 (PDT)	Sanvezzo 76', 78'	Report	Nagbe 41'; W. Johnson 77'	Attendance: 20,303; Referee: Silviu Petrescu

June 1, 2014 MLS	Portland Timbers	3–4	Vancouver Whitecaps FC	Providence Park
18:00(PDT)	Urruti 3'; Fernández 77'; Johnson 86'	Report	Morales 16' (pen.), 26' (pen.); Hurtado 45+4'; Harvey 49'	Attendance: 20,814; Referee: Kevin Stott

August 30, 2014 MLS	Vancouver Whitecaps FC	0–3	Portland Timbers	BC Place
16:30(PDT)		Report	Powell 51'; Urruti 75'; Wallace 79'	Attendance: 21,000; Referee: Armando Villarreal

September 20, 2014 MLS	Portland Timbers	3–0	Vancouver Whitecaps FC	Providence Park
14:00(PDT)	Valeri 28'; Adi 66', 69'	Report		Attendance: 20,814; Referee: Hilario Grajeda

March 28, 2015 MLS	Vancouver Whitecaps FC	2–1	Portland Timbers	BC Place
17:00 (PST)	Mezquida 15'; Earnshaw 90+1'	Report	Adi 82'	Attendance: 22,500; Referee: Allen Chapman

May 2, 2015 MLS	Portland Timbers	0–0	Vancouver Whitecaps FC	Providence Park
19:30 (PST)		Report		Attendance: 21,144; Referee: Allen Chapman

July 18, 2015 MLS	Portland Timbers	1–1	Vancouver Whitecaps FC	Providence Park
19:30 (PST)	Valeri 33'	Report	Laba 57'	Attendance: 21,144; Referee: Juan Guzman

May 7, 2016 MLS	Vancouver Whitecaps FC	2–1	Portland Timbers	BC Place
14:00 (PST)	Kudo 60'; Bolaños 66'	Report	Borchers 34'	Attendance: 22,120; Referee: Kevin Stott

May 22, 2016 MLS	Portland Timbers	4–2	Vancouver Whitecaps FC	Providence Park
13:30 (PST)	Valeri 3' (pen.); McInerney 28'; Asprilla 77' (pen.); Nagbe 82'	Report	Manneh 49'; Morales 83'	Attendance: 21,144; Referee: Ted Unkel

October 23, 2016 MLS	Vancouver Whitecaps FC	4–1	Portland Timbers	BC Place
13:00 (PST)	Barnes 13'; Barnes 32'; Morales 54'; Mezquida 55'	Report	Valeri 72' (pen.)	Attendance: 24,083; Referee: Alan Kelly

April 22, 2017 MLS	Portland Timbers	2–1	Vancouver Whitecaps FC	Providence Park
13:00 (PST)	Nagbe 18'; Mattocks 40'	Report	Montero 59'	Attendance: 21,144; Referee: Chris Penso

July 23, 2017 MLS	Vancouver Whitecaps FC	1–2	Portland Timbers	BC Place
15:00 (PST)	Jacobson 45'	Report	Ebobisse 14'; Blanco 49'	Attendance: 25,082; Referee: Chris Penso

October 22, 2017 MLS	Portland Timbers	2–1	Vancouver Whitecaps FC	Providence Park
13:00 (PST)	Ridgewell 32'; Mattocks 48'	Report	Waston 29'	Attendance: 21,144; Referee: Allen Chapman

August 11, 2018 MLS	Portland Timbers	1–2	Vancouver Whitecaps FC	Providence Park
20:00 PST	Valeri 71' (pen.)	Report	K. Kamara 14'; Techera 43'	Attendance: 21,144; Referee: Jair Marrufo

October 28, 2018 MLS	Vancouver Whitecaps FC	2–1	Portland Timbers	BC Place
13:30 PST	Davies 28', 31'	Report	Flores 90'	Attendance: 25,348; Referee: Ted Unkel

May 10, 2019 MLS	Vancouver Whitecaps FC	1–0	Portland Timbers	BC Place
19:00 PST	Montero 9'	Report		Attendance: 18,356; Referee: Allen Chapman

August 10, 2019 MLS	Portland Timbers	3–1	Vancouver Whitecaps FC	Providence Park
20:00 PST	Blanco 28'; Loría 55'; Ebobisse 90'	Report	Vair 38'	Attendance: 25,218; Referee: Ted Unkel

September 27, 2020 MLS	Vancouver Whitecaps FC	0−1	Portland Timbers	Providence Park
20:00 PST		Report	Mora 5'	Referee: Ted Unkel

November 1, 2020 MLS	Portland Timbers	1−0	Vancouver Whitecaps FC	Providence Park
20:00 PST	Y. Chara 61'	Report		Referee: Ted Unkel

April 18, 2021 MLS	Vancouver Whitecaps FC	1−0	Portland Timbers	Rio Tinto Stadium
19:00 PDT	Cavallini 49'	Report		Attendance: 0 Referee: Allen Chapman

September 10, 2021 MLS	Vancouver Whitecaps FC	0−1	Portland Timbers	BC Place
19:00 PST		Report	Veselinović 66' (o.g.)	Referee: Marcos de Oliveira

October 20, 2021 MLS	Portland Timbers	2–3	Vancouver Whitecaps FC	Providence Park
19:00 PST	Y. Chara 15'; Asprilla 42'	Report	Caicedo 63'; White 75'; Dájome 82'	Attendance: 16,722; Referee: Guido Gonzales

April 9, 2022 MLS	Vancouver Whitecaps FC	2–3	Portland Timbers	BC Place
7:00 PM (PDT)	Dájome 76'; Gauld 90+6' (pen.)	Report	Asprilla 42' (pen.); Niezgoda 60'; Y. Chará 78'	Attendance: 16,772; Referee: Silviu Petrescu

July 17, 2022 MLS	Portland Timbers	1–1	Vancouver Whitecaps FC	Providence Park
7:30 PM (PDT)	Mora 82' (pen.)	Report	White 32'	Attendance: 24,337; Referee: Ramy Touchan

April 8, 2023 MLS	Vancouver Whitecaps FC	1–0	Portland Timbers	BC Place
7:00 PM PDT	White 74'	Report		Attendance: 17,029; Referee: Nima Saghafi

May 13, 2023 MLS	Portland Timbers	3–1	Vancouver Whitecaps FC	Providence Park
7:30 PM PDT	Boli 2'; Evander 18', 54'	Report	McGraw 24' (o.g.)	Attendance: 23,154; Referee: Guido Gonzales Jr.

August 26, 2023 MLS	Portland Timbers	2–3	Vancouver Whitecaps FC	Providence Park
7:30 PM PDT	Mora 53'; Evander 85'	Report	Gauld 13', 60' (pen.); White 36'	Attendance: 22,674; Referee: Rosendo Mendoza

March 29, 2024 MLS	Vancouver Whitecaps FC	3–2	Portland Timbers	BC Place
7:30 PM PDT	Gauld 2'; Picault 29'; Raposo 87'	Report	Evander 52'; Mora 77'	Attendance: 24,693; Referee: Allen Chapman

June 22, 2024 MLS	Portland Timbers	2–0	Vancouver Whitecaps FC	Providence Park
7:30 PM PDT	Rodríguez 26'; Mora 43'	Report		Attendance: 22,471; Referee: Ted Unkel

September 28, 2024 MLS	Vancouver Whitecaps FC	1–1	Portland Timbers	BC Place
7:30 PM PDT	White 3'	Report	Rodríguez 43'	Attendance: 25,902; Referee: Joe Dickerson

February 23, 2025 MLS	Portland Timbers	1–4	Vancouver Whitecaps FC	Providence Park
1:00 PM PST	Antony 73'	Report	Gauld 24'; Vite 32'; Adekugbe 53'; Nelson 61'	Attendance: 20,079; Referee: Victor Rivas

September 24, 2025 MLS	Vancouver Whitecaps FC	1–1	Portland Timbers	BC Place
7:30 PM PDT	Miller 39'	Report	White 88'	Attendance: 20,212; Referee: Jon Freemon

March 7, 2026 MLS	Portland Timbers	1–4	Vancouver Whitecaps FC	Providence Park
7:30 PM PST	Izoita 72'	Report	White 21', 87'; Blackmon 49'; Berhalter 64'	Attendance: 22,473; Referee: Victor Rivas

April 4, 2026 MLS	Vancouver Whitecaps FC	3–2	Portland Timbers	BC Place
7:30 PM PDT	Ocampo 6'; Müller 90+1' (pen.); Berhalter 90+5'	Report	Mosquera 36'; Da Costa 45+2'	Attendance: 25,465; Referee: Joe Dickerson

=== Playoffs ===
==== NASL (1975–1982) ====
1978 semi-finals

August 12, 1978 Leg 1	Portland Timbers	1–0	Vancouver Whitecaps	Civic Stadium
	Clyde Best			Attendance: 16,437

August 16, 1978 Leg 2	Vancouver Whitecaps	1–2 (1–3 agg.)	Portland Timbers	Empire Stadium
			Clyde Best; Willie Anderson	Attendance: 13,155

==== A-League (2001–05) ====
2002 first round

September 5, 2002 Leg 1	Portland Timbers	0–1	Vancouver Whitecaps	PGE Park
		Report	Dailly 62'	Attendance: 4,071

September 7, 2002 Leg 2	Vancouver Whitecaps	1–0 (2–0 agg.)	Portland Timbers	Swangard Stadium
	Kindel 52'	Report		Attendance: 4,060

==== USL (2005–2010) ====
2007 quarter-finals

September 14, 2007 Leg 1	Vancouver Whitecaps	1–0	Portland Timbers	Swangard Stadium
19:00 (PDT)	Jordan 76'	Report		Attendance: 4,761; Referee: Dave Gantar (Canada)

September 16, 2007 Leg 2	Portland Timbers	3–0 (3–1 agg.)	Vancouver Whitecaps	PGE Park
19:00 (PDT)	J. Thompson 27'; Gregor 70'; Ambriz 82'	Report		Attendance: 8,522; Referee: Jair Marrufo (USA)

2009 semi-finals

September 1, 2009 Leg 1	Vancouver Whitecaps	2–1	Portland Timbers	Swangard Stadium
19:30 (PDT)	Gbeke 25'; Haber 49'	Report	Pore 44' (pen.)	Attendance: 4,516; Referee: Geoff Gamble

September 4, 2009 Leg 2	Portland Timbers	3–3 (4–5 agg.)	Vancouver Whitecaps	PGE Park
16:00 (PDT)	Farber 10', 43'; Nimo 83'	Report	Haber 4'; Nash 60'; James 71'	Attendance: 14,283; Referee: Gilario Grajeda

==== D2 Pro (2010) ====
2010 quarter-finals

October 7, 2010 Leg 1	Vancouver Whitecaps	2–0	Portland Timbers	Swangard Stadium
19:30 PDT	Koffie 1'; Nash 13' (pen.)	Report		Attendance: 5,018

October 10, 2010 Leg 2	Portland Timbers	1–0 (1–2 agg.)	Vancouver Whitecaps	Merlo Field
18:00 PDT	Marcelin 49'	Report		Attendance: 4,884 (SO)

==== MLS (2011–present) ====
2015 semi-finals

November 1, 2015 Leg 1	Portland Timbers	0–0	Vancouver Whitecaps FC	Portland, Oregon
14:00 PST	Melano (yellow card) 44'	Report	Koffie (yellow card) 45'	Stadium: Providence Park; Attendance: 21,144; Referee: Allen Chapman

November 8, 2015 Leg 2	Vancouver Whitecaps FC	0–2 (0–2 agg.)	Portland Timbers	Vancouver, BC, Canada
19:00 PST	Rivero (yellow card) 55'; Beitashour (yellow card) 72'	Report	Adi 31'; Wallace (yellow card) 60'; Valeri (yellow card) 62'; Chara 90+4'	Stadium: BC Place; Attendance: 27,837; Referee: Ismail Elfath

2024 wild card round

October 23, 2024 Wild card round	Vancouver Whitecaps FC	5–0	Portland Timbers	Portland, Oregon (Note: Due to a scheduling conflict at BC Place, the match was played at Providence Park, with the Vancouver Whitecaps serving as the home team.)
19:30 PDT	Gauld 20', 31', 59'; White 24'; Armstrong 51'	Report		Stadium: Providence Park; Attendance: 19,143; Referee: Rubiel Vazquez

=== Notable friendlies ===
March 19, 1977 Preseason	Vancouver Whitecaps	1–2	Portland Timbers	Swangard Stadium
	Thompson 21', (red card) 44'	Report	Anderson 41'; Mackay 75'; Hendrie (red card) 80'

April 2, 1977 Preseason Invitational	Portland Timbers	2–1	Vancouver Whitecaps	Civic Stadium
	Mackay 14'; Scullion] 41'; Tiler (red card)	Report	Bolitho 37'	Attendance: 11,920; Referee: John Morris

March 25, 1978 Preseason	Vancouver Whitecaps	2–1	Portland Timbers	Swangard Stadium
8:00 pm	Possee 29'; Hector 58'	Report	Bain 75'	Attendance: 3,947

May 9, 1990 Exhibition	Portland Timbers	3–0	Vancouver Whitecaps	Civic Stadium
7:30 pm (PDT)	Patterson 51', 88'; Miller 83'	Report		Attendance: 1,806

April 27, 2002 Canterbury Cup	Vancouver Whitecaps	0–1	Portland Timbers	Swangard Stadium
			Tennyson 90'

April 27, 2003 Canterbury Cup	Vancouver Whitecaps	2–2 (4–2 p)	Portland Timbers	Rotary Stadium
	Gbeke 26'; Thompson 46'	Report	Ritchie 47'; Benedetti 61'; Alcaraz-Cuellar (red card) 89'	Referee: Gerry Proctor (Canada)
	Penalties
	Robson (penalty scored); Heald (penalty scored); Chin (penalty scored); King (penalty scored)		(penalty scored) Downing; (penalty missed) Winters; (penalty scored) Morrison; (penalty missed) Brasil

April 15, 2007 Preseason Cup	Portland Timbers	0–0 (5–4 p)	Vancouver Whitecaps	Alder Creek Middle School
16:00 (PDT)		Report
	Penalties
	Gregor (penalty scored); Bagley (penalty scored); Griffin (penalty scored); Kreamalmeyer (penalty missed); Harrington (penalty scored); Morrison (penalty scored)		(penalty scored) Gjertsen; (penalty missed) Cann; (penalty scored) McLaughlin; (penalty scored) Montz; (penalty scored) Smith; (penalty missed) Johnston

April 3, 2009 Preseason	Vancouver Whitecaps	1–1	Portland Timbers	Burnaby Lake Sports Complex
19:00 (PDT)	Charles 68'	Report	Claesson 82'

March 26, 2010 Preseason	Portland Timbers	2–0	Vancouver Whitecaps	Starfire Sports Complex
22:30 (PDT)	DeMartin 12'; Dike 41'	Report

March 5, 2011 Cascadia Summit	Vancouver Whitecaps FC	1–1	Portland Timbers	Starfire Sports Complex
16:00 PST	Horst 36' (o.g.)	Report	Pore 5'	Attendance: 1,514; Referee: Ricardo Salazar (USA)

March 1, 2014 Rose City Invitational	Portland Timbers	1–1	Vancouver Whitecaps FC	Providence Park
17:00 (PST)	Johnson 3'; Kah (yellow card) 57'	Report	Reo-Coker (yellow card) 57'; Fernández 79' (pen.)	Attendance: 13,779

February 22, 2015 Simple™ Invitational	Portland Timbers	0–1	Vancouver Whitecaps FC	Providence Park
17:00 (PST)	Wallace (yellow card) 30' (red card) 60'; Ridgewell (yellow card) 54' (red card) 90'; Borchers (yellow card) 80'	Report	Kah (yellow card) 21' (goal) 31'; Waston (yellow card) 66'; Mezquida (yellow card) 88'	Attendance: 15,491

February 24, 2016 Simple™ Invitational	Portland Timbers	0–2	Vancouver Whitecaps FC	Providence Park
19:30 (PST)		Report	Kah (yellow card) 24'; Pérez 38'; Rivero 72'	Attendance: 14,208; Referee: Ricardo Salazar

February 15, 2017 Rose City Invitational	Portland Timbers	2–1	Vancouver Whitecaps FC	Providence Park
19:30 (PST)	Valeri; Adi; Ridgewell (yellow card) 49'	Report	Laba (yellow card) 63'; Techera 79'; Williams (yellow card) 85'	Attendance: 10,286

February 16, 2020 Preseason	Portland Timbers	2–1	Vancouver Whitecaps FC	Providence Park
19:30 (PST)	Valeri 34' (pen.); Polo 46'	Report	Cavallini 39'	Attendance: 13,882

=== Western Conference standings finishes ===
Timbers Whitecaps

P.	2011	2012	2013	2014	2015	2016	2017	2018	2019	2020	2021	2022	2023	2024	2025	2026
1			1				1									1
2					2										2	
3					3		3			3						
4											4					
5		5		5				5								
6	6			6					6		6		6			
7			7			7										7
8		8				8		8				8		8	8	
9	9									9		9		9		
10													10			
11																
12									12							
13																
14																
15																

• Total: Portland with 9 higher finishes, Vancouver with 7.

== See also ==
- Cascadia Cup
- Cascadia (bioregion)
- Portland Timbers–Seattle Sounders rivalry
- Seattle Sounders–Vancouver Whitecaps rivalry
- MLS rivalry cups
