= 1977 Portland Timbers season =

Portland Timbers
1977 season
- Owner: Oregon Soccer, Inc.
- Head coach: (England) Brian Tiler
- Stadium: Civic Stadium
- NASL: Division: 4th Playoffs: Did not qualify
- U.S. Open Cup: Did not enter
- Top goalscorer: (Scotland) Stewart Scullion (11 goals)
- Highest home attendance: 15,764 vs. SEA (Jun 11)
- Lowest home attendance: 8,794 vs. CON (Jun 3)
- Average home league attendance: 13,216

The 1977 Portland Timbers season was the third season for the Portland Timbers in the now-defunct North American Soccer League.

== Squad ==
The 1977 squad

Note: Flags indicate national team as defined under FIFA eligibility rules; some limited exceptions apply. Players may hold more than one non-FIFA nationality.

No.	Pos.	Nation	Player
00	GK	ENG	Mick Poole
1	GK	ENG	Graham Brown
2	DF	ENG	Ray Martin
3	DF	USA	Tim Murphy
4	DF	ENG	Mick Hoban
5	DF	ENG	Graham Day
6	DF	ENG	Terry Alcock
7	FW	SCO	Stewart Scullion
8	FW	USA	Archie Roboostoff
9	FW	BER	Clyde Best

No.	Pos.	Nation	Player
10	MF	USA	Hank Liotart
12	FW	ENG	Willie Anderson
14	FW	ENG	Tony Betts
15	MF	SCO	Pat McMahon
16	MF	CAN	Brian Gant
17	DF	ENG	Barrie Lynch
19	MF	SCO	Paul Hendrie
22	GK	USA	Jim Gorsek
24	FW	CAN	Ike MacKay
29	DF	USA	Chip Smallwood

== North American Soccer League ==
=== Pacific Conference, Western Division standings ===
Pos	Club	Pld	W	L	GF	GA	GD	Pts
1	Minnesota Kicks	26	16	10	44	36	+8	137
2	Vancouver Whitecaps	26	14	12	43	36	+7	124
3	Seattle Sounders	26	14	12	43	34	+9	123
4	Portland Timbers	26	10	16	39	42	−3	98

Pld = Matches played; W = Matches won; L = Matches lost; GF = Goals for; GA = Goals against; GD = Goal difference; Pts = Points

=== League results ===
Date	Opponent	Venue	Result	Attendance	Scorers
April 8, 1977	Vancouver Whitecaps	A	1–0	10,519	Scullion
April 15, 1977	Las Vegas Quicksilvers	H	2–3	14,584	Alcock, Roboostoff
April 24, 1977	Los Angeles Aztecs	A	1–2 (OT)	8,554	Alcock
April 30, 1977	Seattle Sounders	A	2–3	25,237	Best (2)
May 6, 1977	Team Hawaii	H	2*–1 (OT)	13,677	MacKay
May 11, 1977	St. Louis Stars	H	1*–0 (OT)	12,780	
May 14, 1977	San Jose Earthquakes	A	2–3	17,555	Scullion, Best
May 20, 1977	Los Angeles Aztecs	H	1–0	14,872	Hendrie
May 22, 1977	Minnesota Kicks	A	0–1	23,491	
May 27, 1977	Ft. Lauderdale Strikers	H	0–2	12,900	
May 30, 1977	Las Vegas Quicksilvers	A	1–2 (OT)	7,609	Day
June 3, 1977	Connecticut Bicentennials	H	3–1	8,794	Gant (2), Roboostoff
June 11, 1977	Seattle Sounders	H	3–0	15,764	Best (2), Day
June 17, 1977	Rochester Lancers	A	3–2 (OT)	4,120	Roboostoff (2), Anderson
June 22, 1977	San Jose Earthquakes	H	1–2	14,565	Scullion
June 29, 1977	Minnesota Kicks	H	1–2	14,773	Scullion
July 1, 1977	Team Hawaii	A	2–1 (OT)	3,723	Own goal, McMahon
July 6, 1977	Chicago Sting	A	1–2	4,137	Scullion
July 8, 1977	Dallas Tornado	H	1–2 (OT)	13,085	Scullion
July 14, 1977	Toronto Metros-Croatia	A	1–2 (OT)	5,351	Scullion
July 17, 1977	New York Cosmos	A	0–2	41,205	
July 20, 1977	Tampa Bay Rowdies	A	2–3 (OT)	14,230	Scullion, Best
July 22, 1977	Washington Diplomats	H	3–1	11,592	Scullion, Betts, Day
July 27, 1977	Tampa Bay Rowdies	H	4–1	13,328	Scullion (2), Liotart, Best
July 30, 1977	Dallas Tornado	A	1–2 (OT)	20,389	Lynch
August 7, 1977	Vancouver Whitecaps	H	0–2	11,094	

* = Shootout win
