= Harry Merlo =

American businessman and philanthropist in the state of Oregon

- Born: March 5, 1925
- Died: October 24, 2016 (aged 91)
- Education: University of California, Berkeley
- Occupations: Businessman, philanthropist
- Known for: President of Louisiana-Pacific
- Spouse: Flo Newton
- Children: 1

Harry A. Merlo (March 5, 1925 – October 24, 2016) was an American businessman and philanthropist in the state of Oregon. A native of California, he was chief executive of then Fortune 500 company Louisiana-Pacific after it was divested by forest products company Georgia-Pacific, which were both then headquartered in Portland, Oregon.

== Early life ==
Harry A. Merlo was born on March 5, 1925, the son of emigrants from Italy. He grew up in Northern California in Stirling City where his mother ran a boarding house. During World War II he was an officer in the United States Marine Corps. He also graduated from the University of California, Berkeley. After the war he started working in the timber business with Rounds and Kirkpatrick Lumber Company in 1949 where he remained until moving to Georgia-Pacific, another lumber company, in the 1960s. He had one son, Harry Merlo Jr. Later in life he married Flo Newton.

== Career ==
Merlo worked for Georgia-Pacific when Louisiana-Pacific (LP) was divested in 1973. He was the CEO of the then Portland, Oregon-based company. In July 1995, he was forced to resign from LP by the board of directors after the company faced several lawsuits over siding problems.

During his time as leader of LP, he also was a professional sports owner. He owned the Portland Timbers, then of the NASL, from 1979 to 1982. As a philanthropist, he donated money to the University of Portland, who named its soccer stadium in his honor. Merlo also donated funds to the World Forestry Center and St. Mary's Home for Boys, among others. The World Forestry Center's Merlo Hall and The Harry A. Merlo Award are both named in his honor. He also had LP sponsor tennis events, including the Louisiana Pacific Coast Indoor.

== Later life ==
Following his departure from LP, he spent time running his winery in Sonoma County, California, along with his ranch in Eastern Oregon near La Grande. In 2013, he led a failed effort to convert the Portland Water Bureau into an independent, but still public, entity. Merlo died on October 24, 2016, at the age of 91.

== See also ==
- Merlo Station High School
