= Jimmy Kelly (footballer, born 1954) =

Northern Irish footballer

Personal information
- Date of birth: 6 February 1954 (age 72)
- Place of birth: Aldergrove, County Antrim, Northern Ireland
- Position: Left wing

Youth career
- Crumlin United

Senior career*
Years	Team	Apps	(Gls)
- Glentoran
196x–1971	Cliftonville		
1971–1978	Wolverhampton Wanderers	22	(0)
1975	→ Wrexham (loan)	4	(0)
1975–1977	Portland Timbers	49	(3)
1978–1980	Walsall	26	(3)
1980–1981	Kidderminster Harriers		
1981	Portland Timbers	10	(0)
1981–1982	Portland Timbers (indoors)	15	(0)
- * Club domestic league appearances and goals

Jimmy Kelly (born 6 February 1954) is a Northern Irish former professional footballer who played in the Football League and in the North American Soccer League during the 1970s and early 1980s.

== Career ==
After beginning his career in his native Northern Ireland with Glentoran and Cliftonville, he moved to English First Division side Wolverhampton Wanderers in December 1971. Kelly had to wait until 5 February 1974 to make his club debut, in a 0–1 defeat at Sheffield United, and was not selected again for two further years.

He gained playing time by joining NASL side Portland Timbers in 1975, and also managed a run of nine of Wolves' final ten fixtures of the 1975–76 season as they unsuccessfully battled relegation. After only a handful of further appearances for Wolves during the following two seasons he signed for nearby Walsall in 1978.

In 1981, he returned to North America to again play for the Portland Timbers.
