= Don Megson =

English footballer (1936–2023)

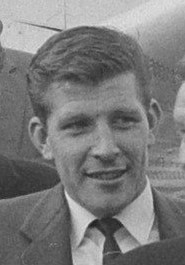
- Megson in 1963

Personal information
- Full name: Donald Harry Megson
- Date of birth: 12 June 1936
- Place of birth: Sale, Cheshire, England
- Date of death: March 2023 (aged 86)
- Position: Defender

Senior career*
Years	Team	Apps	(Gls)
1952	Mossley	2	(0)
1959–1969	Sheffield Wednesday	386	(6)
1969–1971	Bristol Rovers	31	(1)
Total		399	(7)

Managerial career
- 1972–1977: Bristol Rovers
- 1978–1980: Portland Timbers
- 1983: AFC Bournemouth
- * Club domestic league appearances and goals

Donald Harry Megson (12 June 1936 – March 2023) was an English footballer and football manager. He is regarded as one of Sheffield Wednesday's greatest servants.

== Playing career ==
Megson joined Sheffield Wednesday from Mossley in the Cheshire League in 1952. He made his first team debut in November 1959, becoming a regular in the side as a left-back and eventually taking up the role of club captain. It was as captain that he led his team to a lap of honour (the first to do so as a losing captain) after Wednesday's 3–2 defeat to Everton at the 1966 FA Cup final. Don made 442 appearances (including 386 league appearances and scoring six goals) for Sheffield Wednesday before moving to Bristol Rovers in March 1970 for whom he made 31 league appearances and scored one goal.

== Managerial career ==
Megson managed Bristol Rovers from 1972 to 1977, winning the 1972 Watney Cup in only his third game in charge. He coached the Portland Timbers of the North American Soccer League from 1978 to 1980. He also coached at AFC Bournemouth for seven months in 1983. Both of his sons, Gary and Neil, have also played and managed professionally.

== Later life and death ==
Megson worked as a freelance scout for Bolton Wanderers, the club whom his son Gary managed until 30 December 2009.

In October 2014, he released his biography, entitled, "Don Megson: A Life in Football".

On 16 March 2023, it was announced that Megson had died at the age of 86.

== Honours ==
Sheffield Wednesday

- FA Cup runner-up: 1965–66
