= Portland Timbers (1975–1982) =

Defunct American soccer club

- Full name: Portland Timbers
- Nickname: Timbers
- Founded: 1975
- Dissolved: 1982; 44 years ago
- Stadium: Civic Stadium; Portland, Oregon; Memorial Coliseum (indoor)
- Capacity: 35,000; 10,407 (indoor)
- Coach: Vic Crowe (1975–1977, 1980–1982)
- League: NASL
| Home colors | Away colors |

The Portland Timbers were an American soccer team that competed in the North American Soccer League (NASL) from 1975 to 1982. The team was based in Portland, Oregon and played their home games at Civic Stadium for outdoor matches and the Memorial Coliseum for indoor games. The nickname "Soccer City, USA" to refer to Portland was coined during the team's first season. The team folded at the conclusion of the 1982 North American Soccer League season.

== History ==
=== Origins and Early Success ===
On January 23, 1975, North American Soccer League (NASL) Commissioner Phil Woosnam announced Portland, Oregon as the location of the league's 20th franchise for the upcoming season with an ownership group including former Cleveland Browns player Don Paul. On March 7, 1975, it was announced that former Aston Villa F.C. player and coach Vic Crowe had been hired as the team's head coach. A few days later, the name Timbers was chosen from approximately 3,000 entered suggestions. Crowe assembled a roster dominated by players imported from England including Brian Godfrey, Mick Hoban, and Tony Betts who he had coached at Aston Villa; Peter Withe and Jimmy Kelly were both brought over on loan from Wolverhampton Wanderers F.C. and fifteen year Birmingham City F.C. veteran Ray Martin joined on a loan deal as well.

The Timbers finished their inaugural season in first place of the Pacific Division with a league best record of sixteen wins and six losses, scoring 43 goals to earn 138 points for the season, also a league best. Portland defeated the Seattle Sounders after extra time 2–1 in the Quarterfinals and a week later defeated St. Louis Stars 1 - 0 in the Semifinals, also after extra time. On August 24, 1975, at Spartan Stadium in San Jose, California, the Timbers lost Soccer Bowl '75 to the Tampa Bay Rowdies 2–0. A group of around 3,000 fans made the trip from Portland to support the team. Portland's nickname of "Soccer City, USA" was coined by GM Don Paul during the team's 1975 season. A few days after the championship game, the NASL levied fines of $2,500 against Timbers GM Don Paul and head coach Crowe for recruiting violations. Commissioner Woosman characterized the violations, reportedly telling English loan players and their parent teams the players would be able to return prior to the end of the NASL season, as "among the most serious infractions ever in our league". In response, the league passed a rule requiring at least six American and/or Canadian players on each team's roster, putting limits on the number of loan players teams could have and reduced the player limit from eighteen to sixteen.

After returning to England and speculation that he might not return, in early November 1975 Vic Crowe confirmed he would coach the team for the 1976 season. Despite the roster rule changes imposed by the league, Crowe's squad was again dominated by English players including Chris Dangerfield and Jimmy Kelly who both returned on loan from Wolverhampton, with Tony Betts and Ray Martin returning on a permanent deals. Mick Hoban, who served as the team's Director of Community Relations during the offseason, also signed a permanent deal. Although Hoban was born in England, he qualified as an American having earned a cap for the United States men's national soccer team in 1973. Brian Tiler who had been player-coach of Wigan Athletic F.C. was hired as an assistant to Crowe. Three weeks into the season, Crowe announced he would retire at the end of the season to focus on his business and family in England. On May 23, 1976, the Timbers hosted Rangers F.C. in a friendly, losing to the 1975–76 Scottish Cup champions 2–1. After his team's thirty-second straight victory, Rangers coach Jock Wallace called Portland "the best team we've played". In July, team president John Gilbertson resigned his position and was replaced by Keith Williams. The Timbers finished the 1976 North American Soccer League season in fourth place of the Pacific Conference Western Division with eight wins and sixteen losses and not qualifying for the playoffs.

=== Tiler/Megson Years ===
Shortly after the conclusion of the 1976 season, Brian Tiler who had been assistant to Vic Crowe and played in six games during the previous season, was hired as head coach. The contracts of Bermudian and former West Ham United F.C. striker Clyde Best and Scottish winger Stewart Scullion, who had played with Watford F.C. and Sheffield United F.C. in England, were purchased from the Tampa Bay Rowdies. Willie Anderson who had played with the Timbers in 1975 while on loan from Cardiff City signed with the team on a full-time contract. Canadian Brian Gant signed just before the season becoming the team's eighth North American player. Both Anderson and Gant would remain with the Timbers until the 1982 season when the team folded. The Timbers hosted friendlies against two English teams during the summer of 1977, defeating the Bristol Rovers 3 - 0 on June 1, 1977 and played to a 1–1 draw against Ipswich Town F.C. on June 14, 1977. The Timbers ended the season in fourth place of the Western Division missing the post season for the second straight year with a record of ten wins and sixteen losses.

A week after the season, Tiler was fired and in late November 1977 was replaced by former Sheffield Wednesday player and Bristol Rovers manager Don Megson. Megson quickly moved to revamp the roster waiving several players who had been with the team since its first season, signing Clive Charles on a loan deal from Cardiff City, purchasing the contract for Republic of Ireland national team player Jimmy Conway who had been released by Manchester City, picked up two players from Bristol City F.C. reserve team, and, after the start of the season, securing a loan deal for Pat Howard from Birmingham City F.C. As in previous season, the Timbers hosted two international squads for friendlies during the 1978 season, defeating Deportivo Galasca from Guatemala 5 - 0 on May 27, 1978 and losing to English team Bristol City 1–0 on June 1, 1978. The Timbers ended the 1978 North American Soccer League season in second place of the Western Division National Conference with a record of twenty wins and ten losses, qualifying for the playoffs after missing postseason play the previous two seasons. On August 9, 1978, the Timbers defeated the Washington Diplomats in overtime 2–1 in the single elimination Conference Quarterfinals. The following week, Portland swept the Vancouver Whitecaps in the two-legged Conference Semifinals, winning the home leg 1-0 and the away game 2–1. Facing the Cosmos in the Conference Championships, the Timbers were defeated in both games, 1–0 at home and 4–0 in New York.

Soon after the team was defeated in the playoffs by the Cosmos, a majority of the Timber players announced if they did not receive substantial increases in pay, they would not be returning to play in Portland. In November 1978, former National Football League tight end Kent Kramer who has been acting as the vice president of the Minnesota Kicks for the previous three seasons was hired as general manager. Fifteen players from the team's 1978 roster returned for the 1979 season, many who had been on loan deals returning on full-time contracts. To add to the roster, the Timbers purchased the contract of English defender Alan Thompson from Stockport County F.C. and claimed Seattle Sounders franchise leading scorer David Butler off waivers. In April, sixteen of the Timber's first team players walked out as part of the short-lived NASL Players Strike resulting in a pickup team losing 2–0 to Minnesota. In May, Portland hosted two friendlies against English teams, losing to Brighton & Hove Albion F.C. 3–1 on May 17, 1979 and beating Bristol City F.C. 2 - 1 on May 31, 1979. Portland finished the season with a record of eleven wins and nineteen losses, placed fourth in the Western Division of the National Conference.

=== New Ownership and the return of Crowe ===
Rumors had been circulating for over two years that the Timbers might move or go out of business. These rumors were confirmed when team president Don Pollock announced that the team was projecting losses of $500,000 for the 1979 season and that unless a local investor or buyer were found, the team would move or fold. In early September, a sale of the team to Louisiana-Pacific for $650,000 was rejected, but in October 1979 the board of Oregon Soccer Inc. approved the sale to the wood products firm for an undisclosed amount that would enable the team to pay off its approximately $800,000 to $1,000,000 debt. Louisiana-Pacific announced the remaining two years of GM Kramer's contract would be bought out and he would be replaced by Peter Warner, a Methodist pastor and administrator of referees for United States Soccer Federation. Warner announced that Megson would be retained as head coach. On March 1, 1980, former Bristol City F.C. and Coventry City F.C. defender Gary Collier signed on a full-time contract with the club for a reported $750,000. A few weeks later, the Timbers purchased Willie Donachie and Stuart Lee from Manchester City F.C. for a reported $500,000. In total, prior to the 1980 season, the new ownership invested $2 million in players and contracts.

On May 6, 1980, in the only international friendly of the season, Portland hosted Manchester United F.C., losing 1–0. At the end of May, Don Megson was fired after the team compiled a record of four wins and six losses. GM Peter Warner named himself interim head coach and announced that assistant player-coach Jimmy Conway, in his third season with the team, would not be hired to replace Megson. After four straight losses under his direction, Warner announced that Vic Crowe would return to coach the team. Crowe joined the team the following week, with the Timbers winning their first game with him back in charge over the Atlanta Chiefs 1–0 to snap a six-game losing streak. With Crowe in charge, Portland went on to win eleven of the remaining seventeen games of the season, finishing with a record of fifteen wins and seventeen losses, last place in the National Conference Western Division. In October, Portland announced that they would participate in the 1980–81 NASL Indoor season hosting home matches at the Memorial Coliseum with Crowe managing the team. The team finished its first indoor season with five straight wins, ending the season with a record of ten wins and eight losses. Qualifying for the post-season as a wildcard, the Timbers had to play both legs of the series against the Chicago Sting in Chicago due to conflicts with other tenants at the Memorial Coliseum. Chicago swept the Timbers in both games of the series winning 6–2 on February 17 and 8–7 in overtime on February 19.

In late February 1981 the Timbers released six players, including Mick Poole who had been the team's starting goalkeeper since the 1977 season. Keith MacRae who had played with the Philadelphia Fury during the 1978 season and serving as back up goalkeeper for Manchester City F.C. was signed to replace Poole. South Korea national team defender Cho Young-jeung was signed, becoming the first Korean to play in the NASL. A month into the season, the Timbers sold franchise all-time leading scorer Clyde Best to the Toronto Blizzard and brought in Alistair 'Ally' Brown from West Bromwich Albion F.C. and Barry Powell from Derby County F.C. on loan deals. On May 13, 1981, the Timbers hosted West Bromwich Albion F.C. for a friendly, losing to the English Football League First Division side 1–0 on an own goal by Timber player Glenn Myernick. It was the last time the Timbers would host an international opponent. The Timbers finished the season in third place of the Northwest Division with a record of seventeen wins and fifteen losses. The Timbers faced the San Diego Sockers the first round of the playoffs, winning the home match of the best of three series 2–1 on August 22, 1981. They were eliminated from the playoffs after losing 5–1 on August 26, with Gary Collier receiving a red card in the 25th minute, and 2–0 on August 30. Just before the start of the indoor season, the Timbers signed Carl Strong who had previously played with the Atlanta Chiefs franchise that folded at the end of the 1981 outdoor season. In December, the Timbers acquired Ron Futcher, ninth-leading scorer in NASL history from the Minnesota Kicks via a dispersal draft on December 7, 1981.

=== Final Season and Demise ===
At the beginning of 1982, during the team's participation in the 1981–82 NASL Indoor season, it was reported that team owners Louisiana-Pacific were concerned about the viability of professional soccer in Portland and that the upcoming season could determine the fate of the franchise. Portland finished the indoor season with a record of seven wins and eleven losses, second place in the Western Division of the Pacific Conference and did not make the playoffs. Several veteran players, including Graham Day, Jimmy Conway, and Jimmy Kelly, were released by the team. Keith MacRae was also released in favor of Bill Irwin who became a nationalized citizen to qualify as an American under the NASL roster rules.

In April, it was announced that the team would participate in the next NASL indoor season. Partway through the season, the Timbers acquired Dave Bennett on loan from Norwich City F.C. In early July 1982, with the team was in fifth place of their division, Louisiana-Pacific president Harry Merlo announced that the team would be sold at the end of the season. A few days later it was announced that a group at approach Louisiana-Pacific to purchase the club and later in the month Howard Samuels, Chief Executive of the NASL stated his opinion that the Timbers would remain in Portland under the ownership of Louisiana-Pacific. The Timbers finished the season with a 1–0 loss to the Seattle Sounders at home on August 22, 1982. The Timbers compiled a record of fourteen wins and eighteen losses, fourth place in the Western Division. The next day, team ownership confirmed that the Timbers would be sold or would be folded. In September, local businessman James Horne agreed to a deal with Louisiana-Pacific to purchase the club pending league approval. Horne received tentative approval from the league in early October, but on October 21 Horne withdrew his offer and Louisiana-Pacific announced the team would dissolve effective November 1. The next week, Montreal Manic purchased the contracts of Canadian players Dale Mitchell, Greg Ion, and Bruce Gant, while Seattle purchased Timber's all-time leading scorer John Bain. Nineteen other players were allocated to other teams via a dispersal draft.

== List of seasons ==
This is a complete list of seasons for the NASL club. For a season-by-season history including the current Portland Timbers MLS franchise, see List of Portland Timbers seasons.

| Season | League | | | | | | | | | | | Position | | Playoffs | USOC | Continental | Average attendance | Top goalscorer(s) | |
| Season | Div | League | Pld | W | L | D | GF | GA | GD | Pts | PPG | Conf. | Overall | Playoffs | USOC | Continental | Average attendance | Name | Goals |
|---|---|---|---|---|---|---|---|---|---|---|---|---|---|---|---|---|---|---|---|
| 1975 | 1 | NASL | 22 | 16 | 6 | 0 | 43 | 27 | +16 | 138 | 6.27 | 1st | 1st | RU | DNE | Ineligible | 14,503 | (England) Peter Withe | 18 |
| 1976 | 1 | NASL | 24 | 8 | 16 | 0 | 23 | 41 | –18 | 71 | 2.96 | 9th | 18th | DNQ | DNE | Ineligible | 20,166 | (England) Tony Betts | 6 |
| 1977 | 1 | NASL | 26 | 10 | 16 | 0 | 39 | 42 | –3 | 98 | 3.77 | 9th | 15th | DNQ | DNE | Ineligible | 13,208 | (Scotland) Stewart Scullion | 11 |
| 1978 | 1 | NASL | 30 | 20 | 10 | 0 | 50 | 36 | +14 | 167 | 5.57 | 3rd | 4th | SF | DNE | Ineligible | 11,803 | (Bermuda) Clyde Best | 14 |
| 1979 | 1 | NASL | 30 | 11 | 19 | 0 | 50 | 75 | –25 | 122 | 4.07 | 12th | 19th | DNQ | DNE | Ineligible | 13,018 | (Scotland) John Bain (Bermuda) Clyde Best | 8 |
| 1980 | 1 | NASL | 32 | 15 | 17 | 0 | 50 | 53 | –3 | 133 | 4.16 | 9th | 16th | DNQ | DNE | Ineligible | 10,210 | (Bermuda) Clyde Best | 11 |
| 1981 | 1 | NASL | 32 | 17 | 15 | 0 | 52 | 49 | +3 | 141 | 4.41 | 3rd | 12th | R1 | DNE | Ineligible | 10,516 | (Scotland) John Bain | 12 |
| 1982 | 1 | NASL | 32 | 14 | 18 | 0 | 49 | 44 | +5 | 122 | 3.81 | 4th | 10th | DNQ | DNE | Ineligible | 8,786 | (England) Ron Futcher | 13 |
| Total | – | – | 228 | 111 | 117 | 0 | 356 | 367 | –11 | 992 | 4.35 | – | – | – | – | — | – | (Scotland) John Bain | 45 |

1. Avg. attendance include statistics from league matches only.
2. Top goalscorer(s) includes all goals scored in League, League Playoffs, U.S. Open Cup, CONCACAF Champions League, FIFA Club World Cup, and other competitive continental matches.

=== Indoor ===
| Season | League | | | | | | | Position | | Playoffs | Average attendance | Top goalscorer(s) | |
| Season | League | Pld | W | L | GF | GA | GD | Conf. | Overall | Playoffs | Average attendance | Name | Goals |
|---|---|---|---|---|---|---|---|---|---|---|---|---|---|
| 1980–81 | NASL | 18 | 10 | 8 | 110 | 93 | +17 | 2nd | 7th | QF | 5,229 | (Scotland) John Bain | 20 |
| 1981–82 | NASL | 18 | 7 | 11 | 86 | 103 | –17 | 5th | 10th | DNQ | 5,073 | Unknown | X |
| Total | – | 36 | 17 | 19 | 196 | 196 | 0 | – | – | – | – | Unknown | X |

== Coaches ==
- (Wales) Vic Crowe (1975–1976), (1980–1982)
- (England) Brian Tiler (1977)
- (England) Don Megson (1978–1979)

== Honors ==
NASL championships
- 1975 -runners up

NASL Regular Season Premierships

- 1975

Division titles

- 1975 Western Division

U.S. Soccer Hall of Fame

- 2015 Glenn Myernick

Canadian Soccer Hall of Fame

- 2002 Dale Mitchell
- 2005 Garry Ayre

Indoor Soccer Hall of Fame

- 2014 Dale Mitchell

All-Star first team selections

- 1982 Cho Young-Jeung

All-Star second team selections

- 1975 Barry Powell & Peter Withe

All-Star honorable mentions

- 1975 Graham Day
- 1977 Graham Day
- 1978 Clyde Best

Indoor All-Stars

- 1980–81 Stuart Lee

Retired numbers

Main article: List of retired numbers in association football
- 3 – (England) Clive Charles, Defender, 1978–81
