= Keith MacRae =

Scottish footballer

Personal information
- Full name: Keith Alexander MacRae
- Date of birth: 5 February 1951 (age 75)
- Place of birth: Glasgow, Scotland
- Height: 1.80 m (5 ft 11 in)
- Position: Goalkeeper

Senior career*
| Years | Team | Apps | (Gls) |
| 1967–1973 | Motherwell | 119 | (1) |
| 1973–1980 | Manchester City | 56 | (0) |
| 1978 | Philadelphia Fury | 23 | (0) |
| 1981–1982 | Portland Timbers | 20 | (0) |
| Total | | 175 | (1) |

International career
| 1970 | Scottish League XI | 1 | (0) |
- * Club domestic league appearances and goals

Keith Alexander MacRae (born 5 February 1951) is a Scottish footballer, who played as a goalkeeper for Motherwell, Manchester City, Philadelphia Fury and Portland Timbers.

An accomplished all-rounder who could play in any position, before he became first-choice goalkeeper for Motherwell, MacRae often started or moved outfield during matches, scoring 2 league and cup goals in the process.

MacRae represented the Scottish League once, in 1970.

== Honours ==
Manchester City

- Football League Cup runner-up: 1973–74
