= Bruce Gant =

Canadian retired soccer player (born 1956)

Personal information
- Full name: Bruce David Gant
- Date of birth: September 26, 1956 (age 70)
- Place of birth: Burnaby, British Columbia, Canada
- Height: 6 ft 0 in (1.83 m)
- Position: Centre back

College career
Years	Team	Apps	(Gls)
- Simon Fraser Clan

Senior career*
Years	Team	Apps	(Gls)
1979–1982	Portland Timbers	58	(1)
1980–1982	Portland Timbers (indoor)	31	(3)
1983	Montreal Manic	1	(0)
????	Vancouver Firefighters FC		

International career
1976	Canada "B" (Olympic)	0	(0)
- * Club domestic league appearances and goals

Bruce Gant (born September 26, 1956) is a Canadian retired soccer player who spent five seasons in the North American Soccer League.

Gant attended Simon Fraser University, playing on the men's soccer team. He was a 1976 First Team NAIA All American with the Clan. In 1979, the Portland Timbers selected Gant, brother of Timbers midfielder Brian Gant, in the first round of the North American Soccer League draft. He remained with the Timbers until they folded in 1982, playing four outdoor and two indoor seasons with them. In 1983, he played one game for the Montreal Manic.

In 1973, Bruce won a gold medal with British Columbia at the Canada Games. From February to June 1976, Bruce played for Canada in preparation for the Olympic Games. While he played in eight exhibition matches against local sides, he did not make any international appearances and was not selected to the final team.

In 1990, Bruce helped Vancouver Firefighters FC win The Challenge Trophy.

== Personal ==
Bruce's brother Brian Gant was also a professional and international soccer player. His brother-in-law Bill Sinclair played in the Pacific Coast League while his niece Christine Sinclair is a star Canadian player for Portland Thorns FC.

== Sources ==
- Bruce Gant at Canada Soccer
- NASL stats
