= Willie Donachie =

Scottish football player and manager (born 1951)

Personal information
- Full name: William Donachie
- Date of birth: 5 October 1951 (age 75)
- Place of birth: Glasgow, Scotland
- Height: 5 ft 9 in (1.75 m)
- Position: Left back

Team information
- Current team: Southport (head coach - women's team)

Youth career
- 1965–1968: Manchester City

Senior career*
Years	Team	Apps	(Gls)
1968–1980	Manchester City	351	(2)
1980–1981	Portland Timbers	60	(2)
1981–1982	Norwich City	11	(0)
1982	Portland Timbers	31	(0)
1982–1984	Burnley	60	(3)
1984–1990	Oldham Athletic	169	(3)
Total		682	(10)

International career
1972–1978	Scotland	35	(0)

Managerial career
- 2006–2007: Millwall
- 2008: Antigua and Barbuda
- 2011–2014: Newcastle United Reserves
- 2015: Temecula FC
- 2018–2022: Montserrat
- 2023–: Southport (head coach - women's team)
- * Club domestic league appearances and goals

William Donachie (born 5 October 1951) is a Scottish former professional footballer. Donachie had a long playing career, the majority of which was with Manchester City. He also played for Norwich City, Burnley, Oldham Athletic and Portland Timbers. Donachie played 35 times for Scotland and was selected in two FIFA World Cup squads (1974 and 1978). Towards the end of his playing career, Donachie became a player-coach at Oldham, working with Joe Royle. Donachie has since worked for numerous teams in coaching roles.

== Playing career ==
Donachie was born in Glasgow (originally from the Gorbals, he grew up in Castlemilk and attended King's Park Secondary School, but began his football career in England as a junior with Manchester City, turning professional in December 1968. He made his first team debut in February 1970 and replaced Glyn Pardoe at left-back in City's side and quickly established himself as a regular in the side. He won the 1972 FA Charity Shield, played in two League Cup finals for City and went on to make 347 appearances before leaving in 1979 to play for NASL side Portland Timbers. He returned to England in September 1981, joining Norwich City for a fee of £200,000, but rejoined Portland in March 1982. In November the same year he joined Burnley.

In April 1972, he made his full debut for Scotland against Peru at Hampden Park, having previously made two appearances for Scotland's Under-23 side. He went on to win 35 full caps for Scotland and played in the 1978 World Cup finals.

== Coaching career ==
In July 1984, Donachie joined Oldham Athletic where he became player-assistant manager to Joe Royle. Under Royle and Donachie Oldham enjoyed considerable success at Boundary Park, taking the unfashionable minnows to the Premier League, League Cup Final and epic FA Cup semi-finals against Manchester United in the early 1990s.

When Royle left to manage Everton in 1995, Donachie followed as his assistant. Donachie then had a stint as first team coach at Sheffield United. Towards the end of the 1997–98 season he rejoined Royle at Manchester City. In May 2001, Royle was sacked, but Donachie opted to stay at Manchester City as first team coach under new manager Kevin Keegan. In November 2001 he left City to become assistant to Terry Yorath at Sheffield Wednesday. He resigned from his post at Hillsborough on 28 October 2002 to link up again with Joe Royle, who by now was manager of Ipswich Town. Ipswich paid Wednesday £50,000 compensation for this move.

Donachie left Portman Road in June 2006 after Jim Magilton was appointed as manager, this coming after Donachie had stated his interest in the job himself, and joined Millwall as assistant to Nigel Spackman. He was appointed manager of Millwall on 22 November 2006, after being caretaker manager following Spackman's sacking on 25 September 2006. Millwall had been in the relegation zone when Spackman left, but Donachie steadied the ship and Millwall finished the 2006–7 season in mid-table. On 19 March 2007, Donachie signed a two-year deal as manager. He was sacked by Millwall in October 2007, after a run of poor results left the club bottom of Football League One. He then took charge of the Antigua and Barbuda national team for a couple of games against Cuba in late 2008.

In December 2009, Donachie was appointed assistant director at Newcastle United's academy. In December 2010 he was promoted to development coach. On 6 February 2014, Donachie resigned after it was alleged that he had hit reserve player Remie Streete following a 2–0 defeat against Sunderland in an under-21s match.

In October 2014, Donachie was appointed assistant manager at Hartlepool United. On 6 December 2014 Donachie and manager Paul Murray were sacked by Hartlepool, following an FA Cup defeat to non-league Blyth Spartans. Donachie then became the head coach for Temecula FC in the National Premier Soccer League. Donachie joined Accrington Stanley in June 2017 as a youth technical coach.

Between September 2018 and June 2022 Donachie was manager of the Montserrat national football team, ahead of the 2019–20 CONCACAF Nations League qualifying campaign, which doubled up as qualification for the 2019 CONCACAF Gold Cup. An impressive campaign saw Montserrat qualify for League B of the Nations League and just miss out on Gold Cup qualification.

Donachie was appointed head coach of the women's team at Southport FC in September 2023.

== Career statistics ==
=== International ===
Appearances and goals by national team and year
National team	Year	Apps	Goals
Scotland	1972	7	0
Scotland	1973	3	0
Scotland	1974	1	0
Scotland	1975	1	0
Scotland	1976	6	0
Scotland	1977	9	0
Scotland	1978	8	0
Total		35	0

=== Managerial record ===
As of Match played 11 June 2022

Team	From	To	Record				
Team	From	To	G	W	D	L	Win %
Millwall	25 September 2006	9 October 2007	55	24	11	20	43.64
Antigua and Barbuda	2008	2008	16	8	3	5	50.00
Montserrat	2018	June 2022	18	8	4	6	44.44

== Honours ==
Manchester City

- Football League Cup: 1975–76; runner-up: 1973–74

Oldham Athletic

- Football League Second Division: 1990–91
