= Glenn Myernick =

American soccer player and coach (1954–2006)

Personal information
- Date of birth: December 29, 1954
- Place of birth: Trenton, New Jersey, United States
- Date of death: October 9, 2006 (aged 51)
- Place of death: Thornton, Colorado, United States
- Position: Midfielder

College career
Years	Team	Apps	(Gls)
1973	Mercer County CC		
1974–1976	Hartwick Hawks		

Senior career*
Years	Team	Apps	(Gls)
1977–1979	Dallas Tornado	66	(2)
1979–1980	Wichita Wings (indoor)	15	(1)
1980–1982	Portland Timbers	60	(0)
1980–1982	Portland Timbers (indoor)	13	(1)
1983–1984	Tampa Bay Rowdies	47	(0)

International career
1977–1979	United States	10	(0)

Managerial career
- 1985: University of Tampa (assistant)
- 1986–1989: Hartwick College (assistant)
- 1989–1993: United States U20 (assistant)
- 1993–1995: United States U17
- 1995–1996: United States U23 (assistant)
- 1997–2000: Colorado Rapids
- 2002–2006: United States (assistant)
- 2003–2004: United States U23
- * Club domestic league appearances and goals

Glenn "Mooch" Myernick (December 29, 1954 – October 9, 2006) was an American soccer player and coach. He won the 1976 Hermann Trophy as that year's outstanding collegiate player. He then spent eight seasons in the North American Soccer League and one in Major Indoor Soccer League. Myernick also earned 10 caps with the U.S. national team. After retiring from playing professionally, Myernick spent over twenty years as a professional and national team coach.

== Playing career ==
=== High School and college ===
Myernick played soccer at Lawrence High School in Lawrence Township, Mercer County, New Jersey, from which he graduated in 1972. He was All-State as a forward in 1971 and as a defender in 1972. Beginning his freshman year, he led Lawrence to three straight Group 2 state titles. In 1999, he was named by The Star-Ledger as one of the top ten New Jersey high school soccer players of the 1970s.

Following high school, he attended Mercer County Community College in 1973 before transferring to Hartwick College his sophomore season. He is a member of the Mercer County Community College Athletic Hall of Fame. He was a second team All American in 1974 at Hartwick, but lost much of the 1975 season with the U.S. Olympic team as it attempted to qualify for the 1976 Summer Olympics. Returning to Hartwick for the 1976 season, Myernick was named team captain and led the Warriors (Hartwick has since adopted the name Hawks) to the NCAA Final Four and First Team All American recognition. He was also the 1976 Hermann Trophy winner as the top college player of the year. In 1995, Hartwick College inducted Myernick into its Athletic Hall of Fame.

=== NASL ===
In 1976, Al Miller, a former Hartwick soccer coach who was now head coach of the North American Soccer League’s Dallas Tornado, selected Myernick with the top pick of the NASL College Draft. The Tornado traded Myernick to the Portland Timbers in 1980 and he was named the Timbers captain that season. When Portland folded following the 1982 season, the Tampa Bay Rowdies selected Myernick in the dispersal draft. While the NASL folded following the 1984 season, the Rowdies continued to play as an independent team. Myernick remained with the Rowdies before retiring in 1985.

=== MISL ===
Myernick spent one season, 1979–1980, with the Wichita Wings of Major Indoor Soccer League.

=== National team ===
Myernick earned 10 caps for the U.S. from 1977 to 1979, serving as team captain in 1978. He also started 4 games for the U.S. Olympic soccer team during Olympic qualifying in 1976. Myernick was on the American team at the 1975 Pan American Games.

== Coaching ==
=== College ===
Myernick retired from playing professionally in 1985, becoming an assistant coach at the University of Tampa. In 1986, he moved back north to Hartwick College to become an assistant coach.

=== National team ===
After serving as an assistant coach on the 1996 U.S. Men's Olympic soccer team, Myernick was hired in 2002 to serve as an assistant coach on the Men's National Team for the 2002 FIFA World Cup. After the highly successful Quarterfinal run made by the United States, Myernick coached the U.S. Men's U-23 Soccer team as they attempted (unsuccessfully) to qualify for the 2004 Olympic Tournament. He continued serving the U.S. Men's National Team through the 2005 Gold Cup (notably - managing the team during the championship game, when head coach Bruce Arena had been suspended for the final) and the 2006 FIFA World Cup. Myernick was also the organizer of the Colorado Rapids youth soccer clinic from 1997 through 2000 at the Rapids training facility in Westminster, Colorado.

=== Colorado Rapids ===
Myernick served as the head coach of the Colorado Rapids of Major League Soccer from 1997 to 2000, leading them into the playoffs in each of the four seasons. The Rapids made it all the way to the MLS Cup final in his first year at the helm, coming up short 2–1 to D.C. United at RFK Stadium. The team also advanced to the Lamar Hunt U.S. Open Cup final in 1999, losing 2–0 to the Rochester Raging Rhinos.

He also served in the same capacity with the U.S. under-23 Men's National Team in 2003. Myernick was the U.S. Men's Senior National Team assistant coach at the time of his death.

== Death ==
Myernick died in Thornton, Colorado on October 9, 2006, four days after suffering a heart attack during his morning jog on Thursday, October 5, 2006, never having regained consciousness. U.S. Soccer officials, including President Sunil Gulati and former Men's National Team manager Bruce Arena, paid homage to Myernick and praised his invaluable contributions to soccer in the United States. Myernick was acclaimed as an enthusiastic coach, player, father, and friend.

== Hall of Fame ==
On April 8, 2015, Myernick was elected to the National Soccer Hall of Fame along with Sigi Schmid and Kasey Keller.
