= Cho Young-jeung =

South Korean footballer (born 1954)

Personal information
- Full name: Cho Young-jeung
- Date of birth: 18 August 1954 (age 72)
- Place of birth: Paju, Gyeonggi, South Korea
- Height: 1.83 m (6 ft 0 in)
- Position: Sweeper

College career
Years	Team	Apps	(Gls)
1973–1977	Chung-Ang University		

Senior career*
Years	Team	Apps	(Gls)
1977	Korea First Bank		
1978–1979	ROK Navy (draft)		
1980	Korea First Bank		
1981–1982	Portland Timbers	50	(3)
1981–1982	Portland Timbers (indoor)	15	(5)
1982–1983	Chicago Sting (indoor)	39	(6)
1983	Chicago Sting	27	(1)
1984–1987	Lucky-Goldstar Hwangso	50	(13)
Total		181	(28)

International career
1973–1974	South Korea U20		
1975–1986	South Korea	113	(1)

Managerial career
- 1994–1996: LG Cheetahs
- 1998–2000: South Korea U20
Medal record
Representing South Korea
Men's football
Asian Games
Gold medal – first place	1978 Bangkok
Gold medal – first place	1986 Seoul
AFC Asian Cup
Runner-up	1980 Kuwait
AFC Youth Championship
Bronze medal – third place	1973 Iran
Bronze medal – third place	1974 Thailand
- * Club domestic league appearances and goals

- Cho Young-jeung
- Hangul: 조영증
- Hanja: 趙榮增
- RR: Jo Yeongjeung
- MR: Cho Yŏngjŭng

Cho Young-jeung (born 18 August 1954) is a South Korean former footballer who played as a defender. He won two Asian Games, and participated in the 1986 FIFA World Cup.

== Club career ==
Cho was allowed to participate in tryouts for North American Soccer League (NASL) clubs by the Korea Football Association when the national team left for Los Angeles to train in February 1981. He joined Portland Timbers after having offers from four clubs. He played both football and indoor soccer for Portland Timbers, becoming the first Asian to play indoor soccer. In 1982, he made the cover of Kick, the official magazine of the NASL, and was selected for the first team of the NASL all-stars. He returned to his country after the K League was founded in 1983.

Lucky-Goldstar Hwangso was a newly-formed weak team in the K League when Cho joined it in 1984, and so he played as a forward or midfielder in unfamiliar positions if necessary. However, he scored nine goals in the 1984 season, and was selected as the Exemplary Award winner and one of the K League Best XI. He also scored in six consecutive games, becoming a record holder until Hwang Sun-hong broke the record in 1995.

== Style of play ==
Cho was considered as one of the best centre-backs in South Korea and the United States during the 1980s. He didn't have rapid pace and great stamina, but he was noted for his prediction, positional sense and team play. He also had a burly physique and so was skilled in tussle and tackle.

== Career statistics ==
=== Club ===
Appearances and goals by club, season and competition
Club	Season	League			National cup		League cup		Other		Total	
Club	Season	Division	Apps	Goals	Apps	Goals	Apps	Goals	Apps	Goals	Apps	Goals
Korea First Bank	1977	National Semipro League	?	?	?	?	—		?	?	?	?
ROK Navy (draft)	1978	National Semipro League	?	?	?	?	—		?	?	?	?
ROK Navy (draft)	1979	National Semipro League	?	?	?	?	—		?	?	?	?
ROK Navy (draft)	Total		?	?	?	?	—		?	?	?	?
Korea First Bank	1980	National Semipro League	?	?	?	?	—		?	?	?	?
Portland Timbers	1981	North American Soccer League	25	2	—		?	?	—		25	2
Portland Timbers	1982	North American Soccer League	25	1	—		—		—		25	2
Portland Timbers	Total		50	3	—		?	?	—		50	3
Portland Timbers (indoor)	1981–82	North American Soccer League	15	5	—		—		—		15	5
Chicago Sting (indoor)	1982–83	Major Indoor Soccer League	39	6	—		?	?	—		39	6
Chicago Sting	1983	North American Soccer League	27	1	—		?	?	—		27	1
Lucky-Goldstar Hwangso	1984	K League	28	9	—		—		—		28	9
Lucky-Goldstar Hwangso	1985	K League	5	1	—		—		—		5	1
Lucky-Goldstar Hwangso	1986	K League	10	3	—		2	1	—		12	4
Lucky-Goldstar Hwangso	1987	K League	7	0	—		—		—		7	0
Lucky-Goldstar Hwangso	Total		50	13	—		2	1	—		52	14
Career total			181	28	?	?	2	1	?	?	183	29

=== International ===
Appearances and goals by national team and year
National team	Year	Apps	Goals
South Korea	1975	19	0
South Korea	1976	7	0
South Korea	1977	26	1
South Korea	1978	14	0
South Korea	1979	5	0
South Korea	1980	17	0
South Korea	1981	4	0
South Korea	1984	5	0
South Korea	1985	8	0
South Korea	1986	8	0
Career total		113	1

Results list South Korea's goal tally first.

List of international goals scored by Cho Young-jeung
No.	Date	Venue	Cap	Opponent	Score	Result	Competition
1	18 February 1977	Al Ahli Stadium, Manama, Bahrain	28	Bahrain	3–0	4–1	Friendly

== Honours ==
=== Player ===
ROK Navy

- Korean National Semipro League (Spring): 1978
- Korean President's Cup: 1979

Lucky-Goldstar Hwangso

- K League 1: 1985

South Korea U20

- AFC Youth Championship third place: 1973, 1974

South Korea

- Asian Games: 1978, 1986
- AFC Asian Cup runner-up: 1980
- Afro-Asian Cup of Nations: 1987

Individual

- Korean FA Best XI: 1975, 1977, 1978, 1979, 1980, 1986
- Korean FA Most Valuable Player: 1977
- NASL All-Star First Team: 1982; Second Team: 1983
- K League 1 Best XI: 1984, 1986

=== Manager ===
LG Cheetahs

- Korean League Cup runner-up: 1994

== See also ==
- List of men's footballers with 100 or more international caps
