= Gary Collier (footballer) =

English footballer and manager

Personal information
- Full name: Gary Bernard Collier
- Date of birth: 4 February 1955 (age 71)
- Place of birth: Bristol, England
- Position: Central defender

Youth career
- Bristol City

Senior career*
Years	Team	Apps	(Gls)
1972–1979	Bristol City	193	(3)
1979–1980	Coventry City	2	(0)
1980–1982	Portland Timbers	83	(0)
1980–1982	Portland Timbers (indoor)	18	(2)
1982–1987	San Diego Sockers (indoor)	122	(6)
1983–1984	San Diego Sockers	51	(0)
1987	Kansas City Comets (indoor)	25	(0)
1987–1988	Chicago Sting (indoor)	52	(4)
1990	San Diego Nomads	?	(?)
Total		546	(15)

Managerial career
- 1990: San Diego Nomads
- * Club domestic league appearances and goals

Gary Bernard Collier (born 4 February 1955) is an English former professional footballer who played as a central defender. Active in both England and the United States, Collier made over 500 career league appearances.

== Career ==
Born in Bristol, Collier played in the Football League for Bristol City and Coventry City between 1972 and 1980, making a total of 195 league appearances. In 1980, Collier moved to the United States, to play for the Portland Timbers in the North American Soccer League. In 1982, the Timbers collapsed and Collier moved as a free agent to the San Diego Sockers for the 1982–1983 Major Indoor Soccer League season. He would play two outdoor and four indoor seasons for the Sockers. In February 1987, the Sockers sold Collier's contract to the Kansas City Comets for $5,000. The Comets released him at the end of the season and he signed as a free agent with the Chicago Sting. The Sting released Collier in June 1988, just before the team collapsed. In 1990, he replaced Derek Armstrong as head coach of the San Diego Nomads in the American Professional Soccer League. In addition to coaching, Collier also played on the Nomads' backline that year.
