= Louisiana-Pacific =

American building products company

Louisiana-Pacific Corporation
- Type: Public
- Traded as: NYSE: LPX; S&P 400 Component
- Industry: Construction
- Founded: 1973 in Portland, Oregon
- Headquarters: Nashville, Tennessee, USA
- Number of locations: 24 (2012)
- Key people: Brad Southern (CEO)
- Products: Building materials
- Revenue: ▲US$2.828 billion (2018)
- Operating income: ▲US$526 million (2018)
- Net income: ▲US$420 million (2018)
- Total assets: ▲US$2.514 billion (2018)
- Total equity: ▲US$1.700 billion (2018)
- Number of employees: 3,900
- Website: lpcorp.com

Louisiana-Pacific Corporation (LP) is an American building materials manufacturer. The company was founded in 1973 and began the first U.S. commercial production of oriented strand board (OSB) panels. Currently based in Nashville, Tennessee, LP is a major producer of OSB and manufactures engineered wood building products. LP products are sold to builders and homeowners through building materials distributors and dealers and retail home centers.

As of 2011, LP has 24 mills including 15 in the United States, six in Canada, two in Chile and one in Brazil.

== History ==
LP was incorporated on January 5, 1973, as part of a court-ordered monopoly breakup of Georgia-Pacific. William H. Hunt, a vice-chairman at Georgia-Pacific, was selected as Louisiana-Pacific's first chairman. In 1974, Harry A. Merlo, who had been CEO of LP since its foundation, succeeded Hunt as chairman while remaining CEO. For its first 33 years, Louisiana-Pacific was based in Portland, Oregon; the LP headquarters were moved to Nashville in 2004.

LP acquired several lumber companies in California, Oregon, Montana, Washington, Missouri, and Alabama, and, in 1976, it purchased the Fibreboard Corporation, a manufacturer of products used in making furniture and cabinets. In 1979, the company bought fifteen building-material centers in southern California from Lone Star Industries, which provided LP with much needed distribution centers.

In the late 1970s, the company began manufacturing oriented strand board (OSB) by slicing logs into wafers, mixing the wafers with resin, and then pressing them into sheets. Instead of relying on old-growth timber, LP found ways to make structural building products from small-diameter, fast-growing trees. First introduced under the trade name Waferwood, this product was developed as an alternative to plywood sheathing and sub-flooring. After opening its first Inner-Seal mill in 1980. LP also manufacturers industrial wood products, such as hardboard and medium density fiberboard. Along with wood products, the company also produces cocoon cellulose insulation, plywood, and pulp manufacturing. The company controls over 950,000 acres of timberland, and owns plants in 29 states, as well as in Canada and Ireland.

Over the years, LP has been associated with professional sports in different manners. From 1979 to 1982, the company owned the Portland Timbers soccer club in the defunct North American Soccer League (NASL). From 2006 to 2015, it owned the naming rights to LP Field, the stadium which houses the Tennessee Titans and Tennessee State University football teams in Nashville.

=== Expansion during the 1980s ===
Following the production of OSB products, the company expanded its line of reconstituted wood to include I-beams for floor joists and rafters, its line of products made from reconstituted wood to include I-beams for floor joists and rafters. These structural beams used half as much lumber as their solid wood counterparts, yet were stronger and lighter. LP also introduced a concrete form of Inner-Seal, and in 1985 began to market Inner-Seal siding for the exterior of homes. During a period of increased housing construction and remodeling, LP's sales increased by 50 percent between 1980 and 1988, according to the Portland Oregonian. During the same period, its profits increased 400 percent. Moreover, OSB products accounted for an escalating portion of the company's total sales. Only six percent of sales in 1980, the Inner-Seal line by 1990 amounted to almost 30 percent of total sales volume. LP's sales of lumber—once the mainstay of the building industry—decreased from 53 to 30 percent over the same period.

In 1986, the company purchased Kirby Forest Industries and the California properties of Timber Realization Company (the former timber operations of Masonite). From these transactions, LP gained almost 830,000 acres of timberland, which helped balance the land taken in 1978 for Redwood National Park. (LP received a final payment of $440 million from the government for this land in 1988.) In 1990, LP bought Weather Guard Inc., a manufacturer of housing insulation made from recycled newsprint, as well as MiTek Wood Products, a North Carolina–based producer of laminated veneer lumber and engineered wood I-beams.

=== The early 1990s ===
During 1990 sales and profits in the company's softwood lumber, plywood, and building products areas slumped due to weakening demand. This situation was attributed to an economic downturn, increasing concerns over the U.S. federal budget deficit, and fears about the unsettled global geopolitical environment. The construction industry suffered because of bankers' reluctance to finance new projects and consumers' decisions to delay home purchases. Housing starts for 1990 fell to 1.19 million, the lowest level since 1982 and down 13.3 percent from 1989. LP responded to these developments by curtailing production at many of its plants and increasing exports of its specialty building products.

The pulp market also experienced slowing growth in 1990. After a four-year period of rapidly rising prices, pulp manufacturers then faced eroding profit margins due to worldwide economic problems and larger than normal inventories. Although LP saw its own pulp sales and profits peak in mid-1989 and expected only a minor recovery in 1991, the company continued to operate three pulp manufacturing mills. One mill supplied paper pulp to non-integrated paper producers. A second mill produced dissolving pulp for manufacturers of rayon and cellophane products. The third and newest pulp mill, using a bleached chemi-thermo mechanical pump process, rintroduced changes to pulp production by eliminating the use of chlorine and operated in a completely closed system without discharge into neighboring water supplies. This mill marketed its output to manufacturers of printing and writing papers.

LP recovered from the downturn of 1990. While its competitors struggled in the face of dwindling timber supplies, LP reported increased sales in 1992, 1993, and 1994. Much of LP's growth in the 1990s came through acquisition of other building materials companies, such as ABTco in the eastern United States and Forex in eastern Canada. According to the Spokane Journal of Business, 'LP experienced growth because it had vigorously developed alternatives to dimensional lumber and plywood.' Indeed, Merlo told the Wall Street Journal that 'technology'--not old-growth timber resources--'had proven to be [the company's] lifeblood.' Profits for 1992 were up 216 percent from the previous year, and in 1994, the company achieved an all-time high of $3.04 billion in sales. By that year, only one-third of LP's sales came from dimensional lumber—the studs and solid wood joists that frame houses—while over half its revenue came from OSB products, and another 20 percent from engineered wood products and pulp.

=== Lawsuits threaten Louisiana-Pacific's future ===
In the 1990s, LP was the defendant in several lawsuits related to its simulated cedar Inner-Seal exterior siding. Foremost among these were lawsuits pertaining to its simulated cedar Inner-Seal exterior siding. During the 1990s, LP was the defendant in a major class-action lawsuit over its OSB siding product known as Inner Seal, manufactured from the early 1990s through 1996. The company had initiated the class action lawsuit to speed up the process and, according to the judge presiding over the case, "got the most money to the most people in the quickest amount of time based on my experience."

Many homeowners alleged that Inner-Seal siding, which carried a 25-year warranty, began to rot prematurely—discoloring, disintegrating, and even growing fungi. The first claims surrounded the use of OSB panels on the roofs of homes in Florida. Following Hurricane Andrew in 1992 some of these homes lost shingles, exposing the OSB panels to heavy rains. Reports claimed that the exposed OSB began to deteriorate. Two years after the first suit, LP had settled all related disputes. LP re-engineered the product, now marketed as LPSmartSide and since 1997 has sold approximately 3 billion square feet of SmartSide siding with no warranty claims for fungal decay.

Class-action suits brought by various collections of homeowners as well as the attorney general of Minnesota, were filed against the Inner-Seal siding. Although LP admitted to no wrongdoing, the company moved quickly to settle the cases. At the close of 1991, LP had paid over $22 million to settle OSB claims, and between 1993 and 1994, the company paid out an additional $14 million. In 1996, LP committed at least $275 million to a settlement with 800,000 homeowners who had used the Inner-Seal siding.

In April 2003, LP implemented a Claimant Offer Program to speed payments to claimants. In what was the largest class-action lawsuit in the history of the siding industry, LP paid out more than 37,000 claims. By the end of the settlement, LP had paid almost $1 billion to satisfy claims.

LP's woes did not end there, however. In 1996, LP paid $65 million to settle a class-action lawsuit filed the previous year by LP shareholders who alleged that the company had 'violated securities laws by failing to disclose that the company's oriented-strand boards were defective,' as the Portland Oregonian reported on December 5, 1996. It was the largest securities settlement in Oregon history. Also that year, the company settled a 1993 sexual harassment suit against Merlo. Moreover, the state of Colorado brought a 56-count indictment against LP in 1995, charging fraud and environmental violations at its plant in Montrose, Colorado. The same year, LP's eight-person board 'lost confidence in the ability of Merlo and his top two lieutenants to steer the Fortune 500 company,' declared the August 4, 1995, edition of the Portland Oregonian. Merlo resigned and was replaced as chairman and CEO by Mark Suwyn, a former executive at International Paper.

=== Rebuilding in the late 1990s ===
Under this new leadership, LP began the difficult task of regrouping. The year 1995 had been particularly difficult, one in which the company endured a net loss of $51.7 million. The market for building products had sunk as an influx of Canadian lumber had flooded the United States. High interest rates and poor weather (which affected home building) only exacerbated LP's problems. Even more dangerous to LP, however, was the inauguration of several rival OSB mills. As OSB increasingly replaced plywood as a basic construction material, Inner-Seal became less a specialty item exclusively made by LP and more of a building commodity.

Faced with these new threats, Suwyn implemented a multidimensional plan for recovery. First, the company strove to eliminate unprofitable operations. In 1996, LP closed the Ketchikan Paper Company, as well as 22 plants and mills. More closings followed in 1997 and 1998, and the company sold off a number of additional operations, including the Weather-Seal door and window division in 1998. The California timberland was sold to Simpson Investment Company and Mendocino Redwood Company. All told, LP sold over $875 million of assets during the three-year period. 'The assets sales will do two things for us,' Suwyn told Business Wire. 'They will provide us with additional financial flexibility to grow the company and allow us to focus all our management attention on becoming the premier supplier of building materials.'

Suwyn also concentrated on developing LP's specialty products lines. LP subsequently acquired several companies to expand its product lines, including Associated Chemists and GreenStone Industries in 1996, as well as GreenStone Industries, a manufacturer of cellulose insulation, and Tecton Laminates Corp., a producer of laminated veneer lumber and wood I-joists used in the construction industry. Two years later, LP acquired ABT Building Products Corporation, a transaction it heralded as a way 'to expand its specialty products lines and complement its low-cost commodity building products,' according to the Wall Street Journal. In 1999, LP purchased Evans Forest Products Ltd., a Canadian manufacturer of engineered wood and lumber products.

In 1997 LP unveiled its Advanced Technology Center, which provided the company with the facilities to conceive, test, and improve new offerings. LP soon introduced a bevy of new product systems, including Smart Start siding, TechShield energy-efficient structural panels, TopNotch flooring, and Cocoon insulation.

A final prong of LP's rebuilding efforts involved improving operations. In 1996, the company instituted an intensive employee training course—Rapid Change Technologies—designed to enhance workers' communication skills and to empower them to accept new ideas with ease. To increase productivity, LP utilized Business Process Improvement technology to make its OSB mills more efficient. LP also sought to bolster the company's relationship with large and national home center chains, such as Home Depot and Lowe's. These 'superstores' represented the fastest-growing segment of the building industry.

The outcome of LP's vigorous reorganization was not immediately evident. Sales for 1996 were 13 percent lower than in 1995, and resulted in a net yearly loss of $200.7 million. Although the company again operated at a net loss of $101.8 million in 1997, executives remained optimistic. In 1998, LP returned once more to profitability, achieving $12.8 million of net profit from $2.29 billion in sales. Reinforced by a strong housing market, a booming economy, operational improvements, and greater numbers of specialty products, Louisiana-Pacific's future looked bright.

=== Company restructuring in the early 2000s ===
Louisiana-Pacific Corporation has undergone many changes since 2000. From 2000 to 2010 the company made a total of 20 divestitures.

In May 2002 Louisiana-Pacific Corporation announced an asset sale and debt reduction program designed to enhance its long-term competitiveness and financial flexibility.

Company-wide, the downsizing included the sale of a total of 935,000 acres of timberlands nationally, along with manufacturing plants making plywood, pulp, industrial panels, and lumber. Following the initial divestitures, the company focused on core businesses, including OSB, siding; engineered wood products, and plastic building products (vinyl siding, composite decking and moldings).

In December 2002, Louisiana-Pacific Corporation (LP) finalized the sale of 33,000 acres of timberland near Oakdale, Louisiana, to Barrs & Glawson Investments, LLC for approximately $30 million. Throughout 2003 LP continued to sell Timberland in Louisiana, Texas, Idaho along with several mills related to the company's divestitures. The timberland portion of the company's divestiture program exceeded the initial $700 million target by more than $50 million.

In September 2003, LP announced the relocation of its headquarters from Portland, Oregon, to Nashville, Tennessee. Nashville was one of four cities considered for LP's headquarters. The other cities under consideration were Charlotte, North Carolina; Richmond, Virginia; and Portland, Oregon. The relocation was complete in July 2004.

In line with the company's restructuring, in May 2004, Louisiana-Pacific announced a strategic plan to convert LP's Hayward, Wisc., commodity-oriented strand board (OSB) mill to make SmartSide siding products and replace this capacity with a new, state-of-the-art, low-cost OSB mill in Alabama. The conversion of the Hayward Mill was scheduled for 2005. The project agreement for the Alabama mill was signed in June 2005, with production start-up slated for late 2007. As of 2011, the mill still has not opened. But the company has said it still intends to reopen the 130-worker Clarke County mill, which can make more than 700 million square feet a year of OSB at full capacity.

In 2004, the company began producing LP FlameBlock Fire-Rated OSB Sheathing, an ICC certified (ESR-1365), PS2-rated structural sheathing with a Class A Flame Spread Rating. According to the ICC Evaluation Service (ICC-ES), it provides extended burn-through resistance, delivering a 15-minute thermal barrier (ASTM E119). It is durable on the job site, easy to work with, and is Exposure-1 rated to withstand weather during normal construction delays.

In 2005, LP announced its intent to sell its vinyl siding business to KP Building Products, including LP's two vinyl siding mills, located in Holly Springs, Miss., and Acton, Ontario, and a warehouse in Milton, Ontario. In 2007, Fiber Composites, LLC, purchase the WeatherBest® composite decking and railing business from Louisiana-Pacific Corporation. The acquisition included LP's Meridian, Idaho, manufacturing facility and the WeatherBest® brand.

In 2008, the company began producing LP SolidStart engineered wood products.

=== Key dates ===
Key dates
1972	Louisiana-Pacific is spun off from Georgia-Pacific.
1974	Harry Merlo is named Louisiana-Pacific's first chairman.
1978	Louisiana-Pacific acquires Fibreboard Corporation; U.S. government acquires a portion of Louisiana-Pacific's timberlands to form Redwood National Park in California.
1985	Louisiana-Pacific begins marketing its Oriented Strand Board (OSB) as an exterior siding.
1990	Lawsuits relating to defective OSB exterior siding begin.
1996	Mark Suwyn replaces Merlo as chairman and CEO.
1998	Louisiana-Pacific acquires ABT Building Products as part of its effort to focus on the building products market.
2002	Louisiana-Pacific announces major restructuring plan including the divestiture of timberlands, plywood, pulp, industrial panels, and lumber. Following the initial divestitures, the company focused on core businesses, including OSB, siding; engineered wood products, and plastic building products (vinyl siding, composite decking and mouldings).
2004	Louisiana-Pacific relocated its headquarters from Portland, Oregon, to Nashville, Tennessee.
2005	LP announced its intent to sell its vinyl siding business to KP Building Products
2007	Fiber Composites, LLC, purchased LP Building Products’ WeatherBest® decking business

== Engineered Wood Siding (SmartSide) ==
Louisiana Pacific operates several engineered wood siding mills that produce many siding products. The siding products produced at these mills differ in composition from the company's other offerings.

== Additional ==
LP uses forest management and timber procurement systems that are SFI certified, which helps to ensure its wood comes from well-managed forests. The green attributes built into LP products are recognized in green building certification programs across North America.

The company invests in communities by providing funding, products and volunteers to support public schools and nonprofit organizations. Contributions are focused in four areas: shelter, education, social services and the environment.

LP Building Products subscribes to the Lean Six Sigma methodology, viewing lean manufacturing, which addresses process flow and waste issues, and Six Sigma, with its focus on variation and design, as complementary disciplines aimed at promoting business and operational excellence. During 2006 through 2009 LP ramped up its Lean Six Sigma program, training and hiring Black Belts from within, and engaging people in LSS teams across the company. More than 370 Black Belts and Green Belts have been traveling across the company. The Lean Six Sigma teams are delivering greater than a six-to-one return on investment in cost savings for LP.

Domestic subsidiaries

GreenStone Industries, Inc.; Ketchikan Pulp Company; Louisiana-Pacific International, Inc. L-PSPV, Inc.; LP Pinewood SPV, LLC; LPS Corporation; L-P SPV2, LLC

Foreign subsidiaries of Louisiana-Pacific Corporation

Louisiana-Pacific Canada Pulp Co.; Louisiana-Pacific Canada Sales ULC; Louisiana-Pacific Canada Holding Ltd.; Louisiana-Pacific Canada Ltd. Louisiana-Pacific (OSB) Ltd.; Louisiana-Pacific South America S.A.; Louisiana-Pacific Chile S.A; Louisiana-Pacific del Perú S.A.C.;LP-Brasil OSB Industria E Comercio S.A. Less Than 51% Owned Joint Ventures Abitibi-LP Engineered Wood Inc.; Abitibi-LP Engineered Wood II Inc.; Canfor-LP OSB (G.P.) Corp; Canfor-LP OSB Limited Partnership; US GreenFiber, LLC

Principal competitors

Georgia-Pacific Group; Boise-Cascade Corporation; James Hardie; Weyerhaeuser Company; Tolko

On September 4, 2013, LP announced plans to acquire Vancouver, BC based Ainsworth Lumber in a stock and cash deal estimated at $1.1 billion.
