= Dale Mitchell (soccer) =

Canadian soccer player

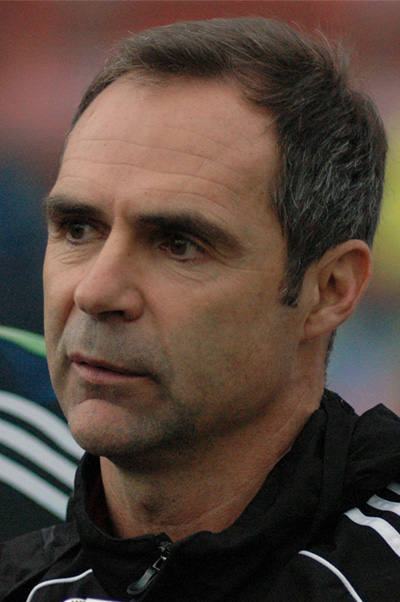
- Mitchell in 2007

Personal information
- Full name: Dale William Mitchell
- Date of birth: April 21, 1958 (age 68)
- Place of birth: Vancouver, British Columbia, Canada
- Height: 1.85 m (6 ft 1 in)
- Position: Striker

Senior career*
Years	Team	Apps	(Gls)
1977–1978	Vancouver Whitecaps	5	(0)
1979–1982	Portland Timbers	101	(35)
1983	Montreal Manic	24	(8)
1984–1985	Tacoma Stars (indoor)	96	(96)
1986–1990	Kansas City Comets (indoor)	99	(99)
1988–1990, 1992	Vancouver 86ers		
1990–1991	Baltimore Blast (indoor)	51	(42)
1991	Toronto Blizzard	22	(10)
1992–1994	Tacoma Stars (indoor)	40	(45)
Total		651	(546)

International career
1976	Canada U-20	3	(1)
1983–1987	Canada U-23	9	(4)
1980–1993	Canada	55	(19)

Managerial career
- 1995–1999: Vancouver 86ers reserves
- 2000–2001: Vancouver Whitecaps
- 2002–2007: Canada U-20
- 2007–2009: Canada
Medal record
Representing Canada
Men's Association football
CONCACAF Championship
Winner	1985 North America
- * Club domestic league appearances and goals

Dale William Mitchell (born April 21, 1958) is a Canadian former professional soccer striker who played for several North American teams in the 1980s and 1990s.

He made 55 appearances for the Canada national team and scored a then national record 19 goals. He coached the Canada national team from May 2007 until March 27, 2009. In 2012 as part of the Canadian Soccer Association's centennial celebration, he was named to the all-time Canada XI men's team. He was inducted into the Canadian Soccer Hall of Fame in 2002. In March 2014 it was announced that he would also be a 2014 inductee into the Indoor Soccer Hall of Fame.

== Club career ==
Mitchell played in the former North American Soccer League. He began his professional career with the Vancouver Whitecaps (1977, 1978), then played for the Portland Timbers (1979 to 1982) and for the Montreal Manic (1983). He was an original player with the Vancouver 86ers of the Canadian Soccer League and American Professional Soccer League for whom he scored 37 goals during seasons from 1988 to 1990 and 1992 to 1994. He was with the Toronto Blizzard for the 1991 season.

Mitchell also played nine indoor soccer seasons in the old Major Indoor Soccer League with the Tacoma Stars, Kansas City Comets, and the Baltimore Blast. Mitchell finished as the league's third all-time goal scorer and fourth in total points with 406 goals and 280 assists for 686 points. He also played with the Toronto Blizzard.

== International career ==
Mitchell made his senior debut for Canada in a September 15, 1980 friendly match against New Zealand in Vancouver (in which he scored two goals) and played his final international in an August 15, 1993 World Cup qualifier against Australia in Sydney. He represented Canada in 22 World Cup qualifiers and also played in the 1986 FIFA World Cup finals in Canada's third group stage match against the Soviet Union.

Mitchell also played every minute of Canada's matches at the 1984 Summer Olympics, scoring three goals including the equalizer when Canada took Brazil into extra time and eventually penalty kicks in the quarterfinals.

=== International goals ===
Scores and results list Canada's goal tally first.

No.	Date	Venue	Opponent	Score	Result	Competition
1	September 15, 1980	Empire Stadium, Vancouver, Canada	New Zealand	2–0	4–0	Friendly
2	September 15, 1980	Empire Stadium, Vancouver, Canada	New Zealand	3–0	4–0	Friendly
3	November 11, 1980	Estadio Mateo Flores, Guatemala City, Guatemala	Guatemala	1–0	1–0	Friendly
4	October 12, 1981	Skinner Park, San Fernando, Trinidad and Tobago	Trinidad and Tobago	1–0	4–2	Friendly
5	October 12, 1981	Skinner Park, San Fernando, Trinidad and Tobago	Trinidad and Tobago	4–1	4–2	Friendly
6	April 20, 1985	Royal Athletic Park, Victoria, Canada	Guatemala	1–0	2–1	1986 FIFA World Cup qualification
7	April 20, 1985	Royal Athletic Park, Victoria, Canada	Guatemala	2–0	2–1	1986 FIFA World Cup qualification
8	May 5, 1985	Estadio Mateo Flores, Guatemala City, Guatemala	Guatemala	1–0	1–1	1986 FIFA World Cup qualification
9	May 8, 1985	Stade Sylvio Cator, Port-au-Prince, Haiti	Haiti	1–0	2–0	1986 FIFA World Cup qualification
10	June 2, 1985	Dongdaemun Stadium, Seoul, South Korea	Ghana		2–1	President's Cup
11	October 2, 1988	Queen's Park Oval, Port of Spain, Trinidad and Tobago	Trinidad and Tobago	2–1	2–1	Friendly
12	October 15, 1988	Swangard Stadium, Burnaby, Canada	Guatemala	1–2	3–2	1990 FIFA World Cup qualification
13	October 15, 1988	Swangard Stadium, Burnaby, Canada	Guatemala	2–2	3–2	1990 FIFA World Cup qualification
14	June 28, 1991	Los Angeles Memorial Coliseum, Los Angeles, U.S.	Honduras	1–4	2–4	1991 CONCACAF Gold Cup
15	June 28, 1991	Los Angeles Memorial Coliseum, Los Angeles, U.S.	Honduras	2–4	2–4	1991 CONCACAF Gold Cup
16	July 3, 1991	Los Angeles Memorial Coliseum, Los Angeles, U.S.	Jamaica	1–0	3–2	1991 CONCACAF Gold Cup
17	October 18, 1992	National Stadium, Kingston, Jamaica	Jamaica	1–1	1–1	1994 FIFA World Cup qualification
18	November 1, 1992	Varsity Stadium, Toronto, Canada	Jamaica	1–0	1–0	1994 FIFA World Cup qualification
19	November 8, 1992	Swangard Stadium, Burnaby, Canada	El Salvador	2–2	2–3	1994 FIFA World Cup qualification

== Coaching career ==
Following his retirement as a player, Mitchell coached the 86ers reserves squad and was first-team assistant coach from 1995 to 1999. He succeeded Carl Valentine as the club's head coach in 1999 when the club was renamed the Vancouver Whitecaps. From 2001 to 2007, Mitchell was Canada's Under-20 national team head coach. In 2004, he served as an assistant coach to Frank Yallop with the senior national team during FIFA World Cup Qualifiers. In May 2007, he was appointed head coach of the Canadian men's senior team. In 2008, Canada did not progress beyond CONCACAF Stage III of the FIFA World Cup Qualifiers, finishing in the so-called CONCACAF Group of Death behind the higher-ranked Mexican and Honduran teams. Mitchell was relieved of his duties on March 27, 2009.

== Honours ==
Canada

- CONCACAF Championship: 1985
