= Graham Day (footballer) =

English footballer (1953–2021)

Personal information
- Date of birth: 22 November 1953
- Place of birth: Bristol, England
- Date of death: 8 February 2021 (aged 67)
- Position: Central defender

Senior career*
Years	Team	Apps	(Gls)
1974–1979	Bristol Rovers	130	(1)
1975–1981	Portland Timbers	122	(9)
1980–1981	Portland Timbers (indoor)	13	(2)
Total		265	(12)
- * Club domestic league appearances and goals

Graham Day (22 November 1953 – 8 February 2021) was an English professional footballer who played as a central defender. Active in both England and the United States, Day made 262 career league appearances. He died in 2021.

== Career ==
Born in Bristol, Day began his career in 1974 with Bristol Rovers of the Football League. Between 1974 and 1979, Day made 130 league appearances, scoring 1 goal in the process.

Day also played in the North American Soccer League for the Portland Timbers, making a further 135 league appearances, scoring 11 goals.
