= Clyde Best =

Bermudian footballer (born 1951)

Clyde Best MBE
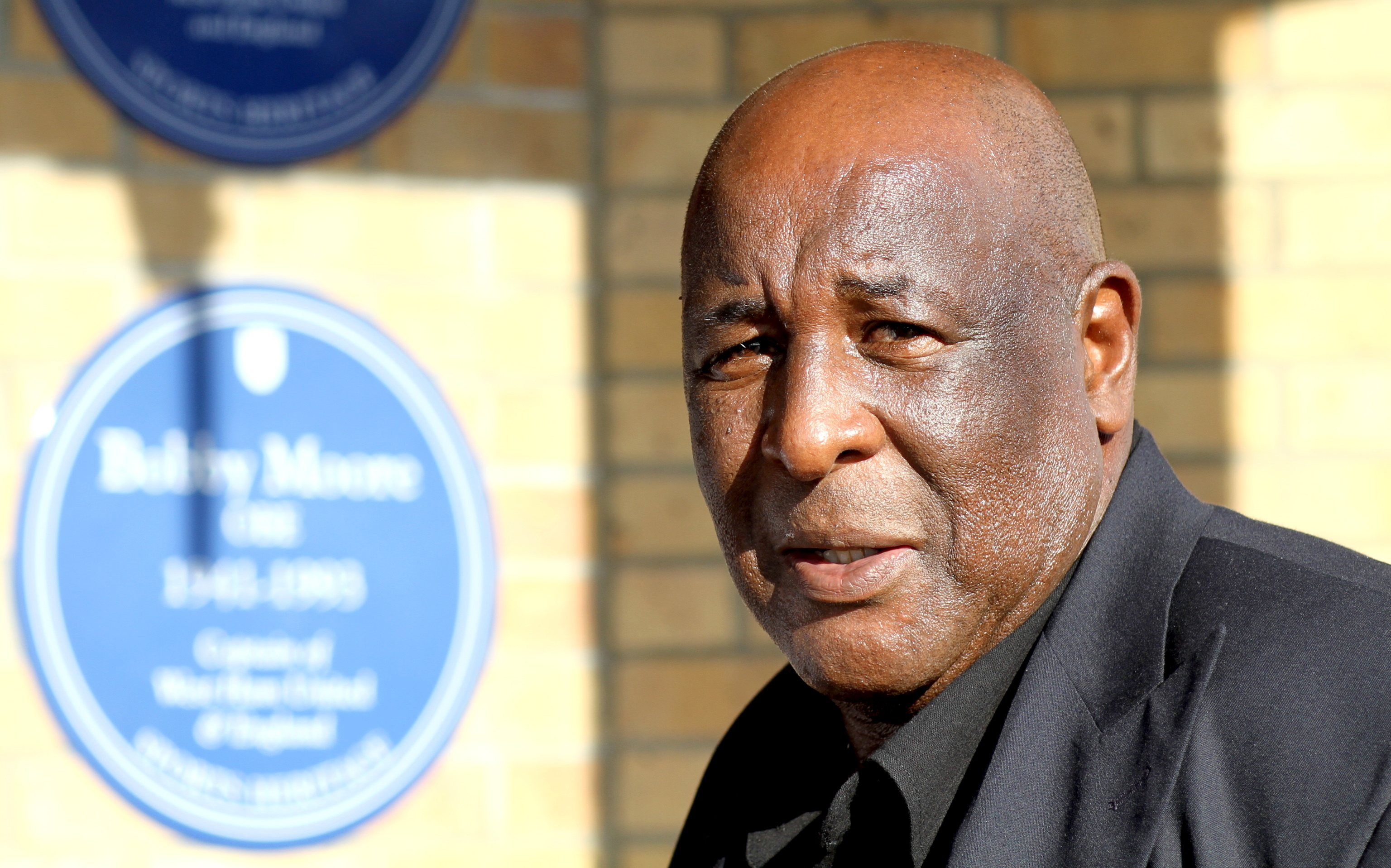
- Best at West Ham United's Boleyn Ground, in August 2012

Personal information
- Full name: Clyde Cyril Best MBE
- Date of birth: 24 February 1951 (age 75)
- Place of birth: Somerset, Bermuda
- Position: Striker

Youth career
- Somerset Trojans

Senior career*
Years	Team	Apps	(Gls)
1968–1976	West Ham United	186	(47)
1975	→ Tampa Bay Rowdies (loan)	19	(6)
1976	Tampa Bay Rowdies (indoor)	4	(7)
1976	Tampa Bay Rowdies	19	(9)
1977–1981	Portland Timbers	118	(38)
1977–1978	Feyenoord	23	(3)
1979–1980	Cleveland Force (indoor)	30	(33)
1980–1981	Portland Timbers (indoor)	6	(2)
1981–1982	Toronto Blizzard	22	(2)
1981–1982	Toronto Blizzard (indoor)	18	(3)
1982–1984	Los Angeles Lazers (indoor)	90	(29)
Total		535	(179)

International career
1968	Bermuda	2	(1)

Managerial career
- 1997–1999: Bermuda
Medal record
Men's football
Representing Bermuda
Pan American Games
Silver medal – second place	1967 Winnipeg
- * Club domestic league appearances and goals

Clyde Cyril Best MBE (born 24 February 1951) is a Bermudian former football player and coach. He was one of the first black players in the First Division in England, scoring 47 goals as a striker for West Ham United between 1968 and 1976.

== Early and personal life ==
Best's father Joseph moved from Barbados to Somerset Village, Bermuda as part of the navy, where he met Best's mother Dorothy, a prison warden. He began playing football for local team Ireland Rangers aged 12, and after falling out with the teams' coach Ed Smith, moved to Somerset Trojans, where he made his début aged 15. Smith would later recall the falling out came after Best had "physically challenged" him, and led to Best being disciplined and dropped from the team.

Best moved from Bermuda to England at the age of 17, to play for West Ham United. Upon his arrival he was looked after by club captain Bobby Moore. He has credited Moore and fellow West Ham players Harry Redknapp and Billy Bonds with helping him deal with racist abuse.

== Playing career ==
As one of England's first black footballers, Best was regularly targeted with racist chanting from the terraces, but eventually became a fan favourite at Upton Park. He was a strong, powerful player with the skills of the traditional English centre forward, tough to dispossess when he had the ball and good in the air. He made his debut for West Ham United in a 1–1 home draw against Arsenal on 25 August 1969 at the age of 18. His first goal for the Hammers came during League Cup competition, in a 4–2 win against Halifax Town, on 3 September 1969. In 1973 Best deputised for an injured Bobby Ferguson in goal against Leeds United. Best played 218 games and registered 58 goals for West Ham over 7 seasons between August 1969 and January 1976.

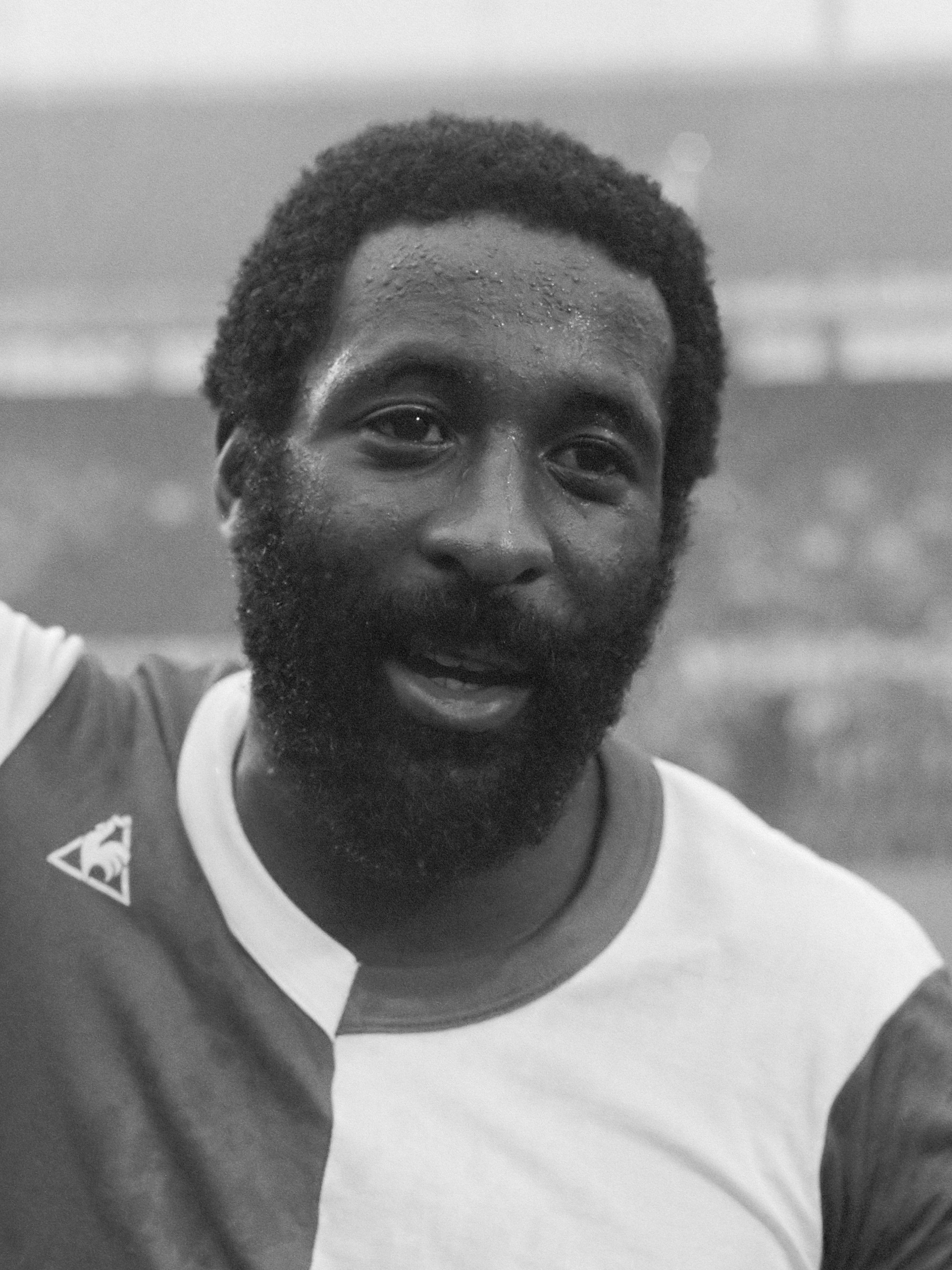
Best with Feyenoord in 1977

Best also played in the Dutch Eredivisie for Feyenoord where he was generally viewed as a failure, scoring only three goals in 23 matches, and in the United States and Canada for Tampa Bay Rowdies, Toronto Blizzard and Portland Timbers of the North American Soccer League. While playing for Tampa Bay in Soccer Bowl '75, he scored an 88th-minute goal to secure the Rowdies' first NASL championship in a 2–0 victory over Portland Timbers. The following spring he led the Rowdies to the 1976 indoor title and was named tournament MVP. He was the Rowdies leading scorer for the brief 1976 indoor season with 11 goals, 5 assists for 27 points.

== Managerial career ==
Best was an assistant coach for the San Diego Sockers for a brief period in the early 1990s. Best coached the Bermuda national team from 1997 to 1999.

== Later life ==
After his coaching career finished he retired back to Bermuda.

== Honours ==
Bermuda

- Pan American Games: Silver medalist, 1967

Best was inducted into the Bermuda National Sports Hall of Fame in 2004. He was awarded an MBE in the 2006 New Year Honours list for services to football and the community in Bermuda.

== Film and television ==
Transforming the Beautiful Game: The Clyde Best Story, a biography documentary about Clyde Best, was released in 2026. The film featured an interview with Best himself alongside notable footballers such as Geoff Hurst, Ian Wright, John Barnes, Les Ferdinand, Viv Anderson, Garth Crooks, and many others.
