= 1989 Portland Timbers season =

Portland Timbers
1989 season
- Head coach: (Scotland) John Bain
- Stadium: Civic Stadium
- WSL: Division: 2nd Playoffs: Semifinals
- U.S. Open Cup: Did not enter
- Top goalscorer: (United States) Scott Benedetti (8 goals)

The 1989 Portland Timbers season was the ninth season for a club bearing the Portland Timbers name. The club, previously known as F.C. Portland, changed its name to the Portland Timbers prior to the beginning of the 1989 Western Soccer League season.

== Squad ==
The 1989 squad

Note: Flags indicate national team as defined under FIFA eligibility rules; some limited exceptions apply. Players may hold more than one non-FIFA nationality.

No.	Pos.	Nation	Player
—	GK	USA	Kasey Keller
00	GK	USA	Greg Maas
—	GK	USA	Glenn Rogers
—	DF	USA	Steve Ancheta
—	DF	USA	Mike DePinna
—	DF	USA	Trent Schultz
—	DF	USA	Sam Singer
—	DF	USA	Garrett Smith
—	DF	USA	Wade Webber
—	MF	MEX	Ignacio Baez
6	MF	SCO	John Bain

No.	Pos.	Nation	Player
—	MF	USA	Dick McCormick
—	MF	USA	Souk Ngongethong
—	MF	USA	Doug van de Brake
—	MF	USA	Jim Webber
—	FW	CAN	Rob Baarts
—	FW	USA	Scott Benedetti
—	FW	USA	Jeff Enquist
—	FW	ENG	Paul Gouldsbrough
12	FW	USA	Mark Miller
—	FW	USA	Eric Phillippi

== Western Soccer League ==
=== Regular season ===
==== North Division standings ====
Pos	Team	Pld	W	L	GF	GA	GD	BP	Pts	Qualification
1	San Francisco Bay Blackhawks	16	11	5	37	26	+11	27	98	Playoffs
2	Portland Timbers	16	11	5	32	25	+7	21	92	Playoffs
3	Seattle Storm	16	10	6	32	23	+9	21	87	
4	Sacramento Senators	16	3	13	20	43	−23	9	40	

==== League results ====
April 28, 1989	Portland Timbers	1–0	California Kickers	Portland, Oregon
	Baarts 64'

May 12, 1989	Los Angeles Heat	0–1	Portland Timbers	Los Angeles
			48' Baarts

May 13, 1989	San Francisco Bay Blackhawks	3–2 (a.e.t.)	Portland Timbers	San Jose, California
	Palić 59'; Corpening 97', 107'		50' McCormick; 110' Gouldsbrough

May 20, 1989	Portland Timbers	4–0	Arizona Condors	Portland, Oregon
	Benedetti 41', 66', 75'; Singer 82'

May 24, 1989	Portland Timbers	1–0	Los Angeles Heat	Portland, Oregon
	Baarts 36'

May 27, 1989	Arizona Condors	2–1	Portland Timbers	Mesa, Arizona
	Kerlin 39'; Veatch 79' (pen.)		90' J. Webber

June 3, 1989	Seattle Storm	2–3 (a.e.t.)	Portland Timbers	Seattle
	James 3'; Carnell 90'		34' (o.g.); 62' Schultz; 108' J. Webber

June 10, 1989	Portland Timbers	0–1	Sacramento Senators	Portland, Oregon
			88' Baena

June 16, 1989	Real Santa Barbara	1–2	Portland Timbers	Santa Barbara, California
	John 57'		59' Gouldsbrough; 90' Baarts

June 18, 1989	Sacramento Senators	3–6	Portland Timbers	Sacramento, California
	Smith 7'; Lang 39'; Bilotta 89'		42', 58' Gouldsbrough; 52', 86' J. Webber; 79', 82' Enquist

June 28, 1989	Portland Timbers	4–0	San Diego Nomads	Portland, Oregon
	Benedetti 12', 34', 44'; J. Webber 88'

July 1, 1989	Portland Timbers	5–1	Real Santa Barbara	Portland, Oregon
	Baarts 5', 32'; Benedetti 13', 46'; Enquist 85'		59' DePaco

July 12, 1989	Portland Timbers	1–0	Seattle Storm	Portland, Oregon
	Baarts 59'

July 15, 1989	Portland Timbers	0–0 (a.e.t.) (3–5 p)	San Francisco Bay Blackhawks	Portland, Oregon

July 22, 1989	California Kickers	0–0 (a.e.t.) (2–4 p)	Portland Timbers	Hollywood, California

July 23, 1989	San Diego Nomads	0–0 (a.e.t.) (7–6 p)	Portland Timbers	San Diego

=== Postseason ===
==== Playoff bracket ====
Semifinals
San Diego Nomads	2
Portland Timbers	1
San Francisco Bay Blackhawks (aet) (p)	1 (4)
Los Angeles Heat	1 (2)

Final
San Diego Nomads	1
San Francisco Bay Blackhawks	0

==== Playoff results ====
July 29, 1989	San Diego Nomads	2–1	Portland Timbers	San Diego
	Hirmez 11' (pen.); Wright 51'		41' Bain
