= 1990 Portland Timbers season =

Portland Timbers
1990 season
- Head coach: (Scotland) John Bain
- Stadium: Civic Stadium
- APSL: Division: 4th Playoffs: Did not qualify
- U.S. Open Cup: Did not enter
- Top goalscorer: (United States) Shawn Medved (10 goals)
- Average home league attendance: 3,427

The 1990 Portland Timbers season was the tenth season for a club bearing the Portland Timbers name.

== Squad ==
The 1990 squad

Note: Flags indicate national team as defined under FIFA eligibility rules; some limited exceptions apply. Players may hold more than one non-FIFA nationality.

No.	Pos.	Nation	Player
00	GK	USA	Greg Maas
1	GK	USA	Todd Strobeck
2	DF	USA	Billy Crook
3	DF	USA	Mike Minor
4	DF	CAN	Ian MacLean
5	MF	USA	Dick McCormick
6	MF	SCO	John Bain
7	MF	USA	Joe Holloway
8	MF	USA	Quinn Ross
9	FW	USA	Robert Paterson

No.	Pos.	Nation	Player
10	FW	USA	Mark Miller
11	FW	USA	Shawn Medved
12	MF	USA	Tim Bartro
13	DF	USA	Bernd Strom
14	FW	USA	Eric Phillippi
15	DF	USA	Daryl Green
16	MF	USA	Steve Piercy
17	MF	USA	Souk Ngongethong
18	FW	USA	Jeff Enquist
19	FW	USA	Peter Hattrup

== American Professional Soccer League ==
=== West Conference, North Division standings ===
Pos	Club	Pld	W	L	GF	GA	GD	Pts
1	San Francisco Bay Blackhawks	20	13	7	39	30	+9	104
2	Salt Lake Sting	20	12	8	39	34	+5	104
3	Colorado Foxes	20	14	6	22	12	+10	100
4	Portland Timbers	20	10	10	42	36	+6	99
5	Seattle Storm	20	10	10	42	35	+7	93

Pld = Matches played; W = Matches won; L = Matches lost; GF = Goals for; GA = Goals against; GD = Goal difference; Pts = Points
Source: [1]
