= History of the Portland Timbers franchise =

The history of the Portland Timbers stretches back to 1975, when the original Timbers club joined the North American Soccer League, to the present club that plays in Major League Soccer.

The NASL Timbers reached Soccer Bowl '75 in their first season and folded after the 1982 season. F.C. Portland, which began play in 1985, took the Timbers name in 1989 and folded after the 1990 season. A new Timbers club played in the A-League, USL First Division and USSF Division 2 from 2001 to 2010. Major League Soccer awarded Portland an expansion franchise in 2009, and the current club began MLS play in 2011.

== Franchise timeline ==
League members Former members Other League

== NASL (1975–1982) ==
In January 1975, the North American Soccer League awarded an expansion franchise to Portland, Oregon. The name was selected on March 8 from more than 3,000 entries in an open contest. In their inaugural season of 1975, the Timbers went to the championship game, Soccer Bowl '75, but lost to the Tampa Bay Rowdies 2–0. During this season Portland became known as "Soccer City USA". While the Timbers had some of the league's best fan support, they sometimes struggled on the field. Despite going to the championship game in their first season, they missed the playoffs in 1976 and 1977. In 1978, they went to the Conference Finals before falling to the New York Cosmos.

The team folded at the end of the 1982 season as player salaries outpaced team revenue. Many of its players stayed in the Portland area after their playing careers and helped establish soccer as a local sport.

== F.C. Portland (1985–1990) ==
In 1985, F.C. Portland joined with three other independent clubs, the U.S. based F.C. Seattle and San Jose Earthquakes and the Canadian Victoria Riptides in a home and away round robin tournament, known as the Western Alliance Challenge Series. The four teams also played the Canadian Edmonton Brick Men and the Canadian national team. The games against the Brick Men counted in the standings which determined the end of series champions.

F.C. Portland hosted the first game of the series, against Seattle. The game, played in Portland's Civic Center, attracted 2,906 fans.

F.C. Portland also played a game against the Houston Dynamos in Houston.

After the success of 1985, the three U.S. teams elected to form a league, which they named the Western Soccer Alliance. While the Victoria Riptides opted out of the league, the Edmonton Brick Men joined the alliance, along with the Hollywood Kickers, Los Angeles Heat and San Diego Nomads. The teams continued the first year practice of playing outside teams (Manchester City and Dundee this year) with results counting in the alliance standings.

F.C. Portland saw a significant improvement over the previous season. Behind the production of forwards Brent Goulet (league leading 9 goals and 2 assists), and Mark Miller (7 goals and 5 assists), the team finished second in the standings with a 6–6–2 record. At the time, Goulet played for Warner Pacific College, a local school. He played with F.C. Portland as an amateur.

In 1986, former Timbers player Clive Charles began coaching the University of Portland (U.P.) men's soccer team, bringing this team to national prominence. This led to an infusion of U.P. players into F.C. Portland in later years.

In 1987, Edmonton dropped from the alliance to join the Canadian Soccer League and the Hollywood Kickers changed their name to the California Kickers. The league also reduced the number of games from 12 to 10. Although Brent Goulet was named the season MVP, F.C. Portland finished fourth in the standings and missed out on the alliance's first playoff, won by the San Diego Nomads.

At the end of the season, the team lost Goulet when he finished his four years at Warner Pacific College and signed with British club AFC Bournemouth.

1988 saw F.C. Portland drop to the bottom of the end of year standings despite once again having the alliance's leading scorer, Scott Benedetti with 8 goals and no assists. At the time Benedetti was between his junior and senior year playing soccer for Clive Charles at the University of Portland. The alliance kept the same teams as the 1987 season, but played 12 games, including games against Canadian Soccer League teams, Calgary Kickers and Vancouver 86ers. F.C. Portland finished 1–11.

That year the alliance named an All Star team, which included Portland goalkeeper Todd Strobeck.

In 1989, F.C. Portland went through several changes. First, Art Dixon, a local businessman, took control of F.C. Portland and renamed it the Portland Timbers. Dixon was a longtime Timbers fan, holding season tickets from 1979 through the team's last season in 1982. He also invested money in the team and brought former Timbers player John Bain back as player-coach. Then, the Western Soccer Alliance became the Western Soccer League (WSL). The WSL also added three new teams, Real Santa Barbara, Arizona Condors and Sacramento Senators. To accommodate the new teams, the Western Soccer League split into two divisions – North and South. The Portland Timbers joined the former San Jose Earthquakes, now known as the San Francisco Bay Blackhawks; the F.C. Seattle, now known as the Seattle Storm; and the new Sacramento Senators in the North Division.

Portland improved from 1–11 the previous season to 11–5 and tied with the Blackhawks for the North Division lead. The Blackhawks won the division championship, and the playoff berth, based on goal differential.

Goalkeeper Kasey Keller was selected as the league's MVP. Additionally, Portland placed Keller, midfielder/coach John Bain and forward Scott Benedetti on the WSL All Star team. At the time, Keller was also playing NCAA soccer with the University of Portland.

In February 1990, the WSL announced it had reached a merger agreement with the American Soccer League, which had teams along the east coast. The new league was named the American Professional Soccer League. The APSL was split into East and West Conferences, both with North and South Divisions. The Portland Timbers remained in the North Division, which also had the San Francisco Bay Blackhawks, Seattle Storm and newly established Salt Lake Sting and Colorado Foxes.

That year, Portland's final season, the team finished with a 10–10 record and out of playoff contention. This was also the first year the team failed to garner any individual player honors. Its leading goal scorer, Shawn Medved with 10 goals and 2 assists, was seventh on the league's scoring list. Kasey Keller had also moved on after playing in the 1990 FIFA World Cup and then signing with British club Millwall and Scott Benedetti had transferred to Seattle.

Over half of the teams from the 1990 season, including Portland, would not return for the 1991 season. Team owner Art Dixon folded the team, having lost more than $500,000 over the two years he owned the team.

== USL (2001–2010) ==
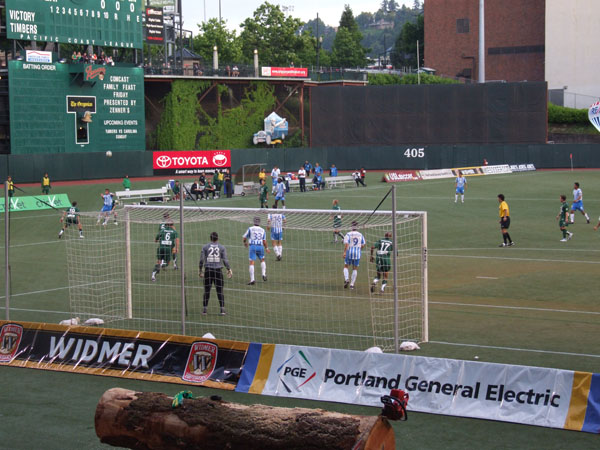
Portland Timbers

Through the 2003 season, the Timbers compiled an inconsistent record, qualifying for league playoffs two out of the three years. Nonetheless, they established themselves as one of the best-drawing teams in the A-League, averaging attendance above 5,000 in each of their four years of existence.

In the 2004 season, the Timbers finished first in the Western Conference, with a record of 18 wins, 7 losses, and 3 draws (57 points). However, they were eliminated in the first round of the playoffs by their long-standing rival, the Seattle Sounders.

In 2005, the Timbers reached the playoffs, where they were eliminated by rival club Seattle Sounders. The 2005 season also included a 6–1 win over the Atlanta Silverbacks on September 8, 2005, and Portland was the only team to beat the Montreal Impact at home; Timbers players Scot Thompson, Hugo Alcaraz-Cuellar, and Dan Antoniuk won league awards.

In 2006, the Timbers finished tied for last in the table with a franchise-worst 7–15–6 record (27 points). They scored a league-low 25 goals and lost their derby with rival Seattle Sounders.

In 2007, Portland finished second in the league, behind rival Seattle Sounders. They won friendlies against Preston North End (2–1), Club Necaxa (1–0) and Toronto FC (4–1), drew 1–1 with the A.C. Milan Primavera squad before winning on penalties, and went unbeaten at home during the regular season.

In 2008, the Timbers finished last with a 7–13–10 record, scoring a league-low 26 goals and conceding 33. Attendance nevertheless reached a record high in 2008, growing 25.5% to an average of 8,567 (second in the USL-1 behind the Montreal Impact), and Cameron Knowles won an All-League Second Team spot.

2009 was a record-setting season for the Timbers. They went unbeaten for a USL-1 record 24 matches in a row, which started following a 1–0 loss to Vancouver in the first game of the season, and ended with a September 3 defeat to Rochester Rhinos at PGE Park. They finished their season at the top of the table (16–4–10, 58 points), winning the Commissioner's Cup and a first round bye in the playoffs. With their 3–1 victory over the Miami FC Blues, the Timbers also were the first team to clinch a playoff spot in the 2009 season. The Timbers were eliminated from the playoffs in their first two games (1–2, 3–3) on goal aggregate to Cascadia rival Vancouver Whitecaps.

== MLS (2011–) ==
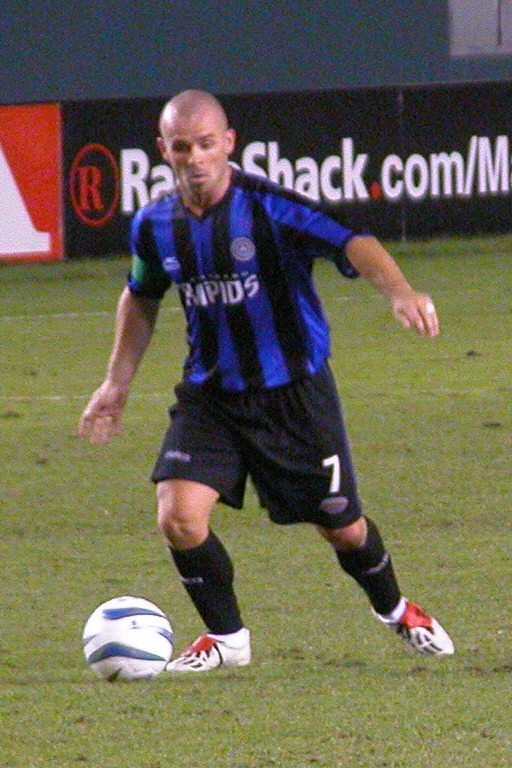
John Spencer was named the coach of the Timbers for the 2011 campaign.

The announcement was the culmination of a nearly two-year-long process for Merritt Paulson, dating back at least to May 2007, when Paulson led a group that bought the Portland Beavers and the USL Timbers. The group included former Treasury Secretary Henry Paulson (Merritt Paulson's father), who held a 20% stake. The biggest issue for the city of Portland was that due to league concerns about seating configuration, field surface, and scheduling, obtaining an MLS franchise would require a new stadium.

In October 2007, Paulson said PGE Park could be upgraded for about $20 million, and a new baseball stadium (with 8,000 to 9,000 seats) would cost about $30 million. By November 2008, Paulson told The New York Times he expected Portland taxpayers would spend $85 million to "build a new baseball stadium for his Beavers and renovate PGE Park—just remodeled in 2001 at a cost to taxpayers of $38.5 million—for soccer", and that in exchange, he would spend $40 million for the franchise fee to bring a new Major League Soccer team to Portland. MLS supported the proposal, wanting to continue to expand the number of owners in the league (for a while, all of its teams were owned by three men: Phil Anschutz, Lamar Hunt, and Robert Kraft).

Supporting the MLS franchise raised numerous issues for Mayor Sam Adams and the Portland City Council, in spite of a subsequent commitment from Paulson that Peregrine LLC would contribute $12.5 million towards stadium construction. To justify the $88.8 million of city dollars Peregrine LLC wanted for PGE Park renovation and Beavers relocation, the city had to assume that Paulson's revenue projections were accurate (e.g. "2011 ticket revenues from baseball will be 95 percent higher than revenues in 2008"), cut some street maintenance and cleaning, and cut about $150,000 from the streetlight budget. The city's use of existing urban renewal district funds and establishment of a new district that "stretches the statutory requirement that a district suffer urban blight" would create budgetary and potentially legal problems and drain millions of dollars from Multnomah County's general fund.

The Portland franchise was announced as Major League Soccer's eighteenth team on March 20, 2009 by Commissioner Don Garber. The announcement occurred in the middle of the first and second-round games of the 2009 NCAA Men's Division I Basketball Tournament being held in Portland the same week. The announcement noted that the team would retain the Portland Timbers name.

The team owner was Peregrine Sports, LLC, a group led by Merritt Paulson. Paulson was also the head of Shortstop LLC, which previously owned the USL-1 Timbers as well as the Pacific Coast League's Portland Beavers.

Former MLS forward and assistant coach John Spencer was named the first head coach of the MLS-era Timbers on August 10, 2010. It was also announced that Gavin Wilkinson, head coach of the USL-1/USSF D-2 Timbers, would stay on as the general manager/technical director of the MLS side.

== Honors ==
=== League ===
==== NASL ====
Soccer Bowl/League Championship

- Runner-up (1): 1975

Regular Season

- Winner (1): 1975

Division Championship

- Winner (1): 1975

==== A-League/USL ====
Regular Season

- Winner (2): 2004, 2009
- Runner-up (1): 2007

Conference Championship

- Winner (1): 2004

==== MLS ====
- Winner (1): 2015 MLS Cup
- Runner-up (2): 2018, 2021

=== Other ===
Columbia Cup vs. Vancouver Whitecaps

- Winner: 1975

Rose Festival Cup vs. Seattle Sounders

- Winner (4): 1977, 1978, 1979, 1981
- Runner-up: 1980

Mountain Bar Cup vs. Seattle Sounders

- Runner-up (3): 1978, 1979, 1980

Cascadia Cup

- Winner (3): 2009, 2010, 2012
- Runner-up (3): 2004, 2005, 2011

== Personnel ==
=== Ownership History ===
Ownership Group	Led by	Years	League
Oregon Soccer Inc.		1975–1979	NASL
Louisiana-Pacific	Harry Merlo	1979–1982	NASL
		1985	WACS
		1986–1988	WSA
	Art Dixon	1989	WSL
	Art Dixon	1990	APSL
Portland Family Entertainment LP	Mark Gardiner and Marshall Glickman	2001	A-League
Portland Family Entertainment LP	Several limited partners	2001–2004	A-League
Beavers PCL Baseball LLC	Pacific Coast League	2004	A-League
Beavers PCL Baseball LLC	Pacific Coast League	2005–2006	USL-1
Portland Baseball Investment Group LLC	Abe Alizadeh^{[A]}	2006–2007	USL-1
Shortstop LLC	Merritt Paulson	2007–2009	USL-1
Shortstop LLC	Merritt Paulson	2010	D-2 Pro League
Peregrine Sports LLC	Merritt Paulson	2011–	MLS

=== Managerial History ===
Name	Nat.	Years	League
Vic Crowe	(Wales)	1975–1976	NASL
Brian Tiler	(England)	1977	NASL
Don Megson	(England)	1978–1980	NASL
Peter Warner	(England)	1980 (interim)	NASL
Vic Crowe	(Wales)	1980–1982	NASL
Bernie Fagan	(England)	1985	WACS
Bernie Fagan	(England)	1986–1988	WSA
John Bain	(Scotland)	1989	WSL
John Bain	(Scotland)	1990	APSL
Bobby Howe	(England)	2001–2004	A-League
Bobby Howe	(England)	2005	USL-1
Chris Agnello	(United States)	2006	USL-1
Gavin Wilkinson	(New Zealand)	2007–2009	USL-1
Gavin Wilkinson	(New Zealand)	2010	D-2 Pro League
John Spencer	(Scotland)	2011–2012	MLS
Gavin Wilkinson	(New Zealand)	2012 (interim)	MLS
Caleb Porter	(United States)	2013–2017	MLS
Giovanni Savarese	(Venezuela)	2017–2023	MLS
Miles Joseph	(United States)	2023 (interim)	MLS
Phil Neville	(England)	2023 – present	MLS

== Notes ==
A. It was announced on March 30, 2005 that Portland Baseball Investment Group, headed by Abe Alizadeh, had agreed to buy the Timbers and the Portland Beavers baseball club from the Pacific Coast League. The Timbers referred to Alizadeh as the Majority Owner in press releases throughout the 2005 and 2006 seasons. However, the sale was not officially completed until June 16, 2006.
