= List of Portland Timbers seasons =

This is a list of seasons played by the Portland Timbers in American soccer, from 1975, when the original club first competed in the North American Soccer League, through the most recent completed season. All four incarnations of the Portland Timbers are represented. This list details the club's achievements in all competitions and the top scorers for each season. Records of friendlies and preseason tournaments are not included. Totals include the records and statistics of all four iterations of the club.

== Key ==
Key to competitions

- Major League Soccer (MLS) – The top-flight of soccer in the United States, established in 1996.
- USSF Division 2 Professional League (D2 Pro) – The second division of soccer in the United States for a single season in 2010, now defunct.
- USL First Division (USL-1) – The second division of soccer in the United States from 2005 through 2009.
- A-League – The second division of soccer in the United States from 1995 through 2004, now defunct.
- American Professional Soccer League (APSL) – The second division of soccer in the United States from 1990 through 1996, now defunct.
- Western Soccer League (WSL) – The second division of soccer in the United States from 1985 through 1989, now defunct. The league was previously known as the Western Soccer Alliance (WSA) and the Western Alliance Challenge Series (WACS). The WSL was the third division of American soccer from its founding until its elevation to second division status in 1989.
- North American Soccer League (NASL) – The top-flight of soccer in the United States from 1968 through 1984, now defunct.
- U.S. Open Cup (USOC) – The premier knockout cup competition in U.S. soccer, first contested in 1914.
- CONCACAF Champions League (CCL) – The premier competition in North American soccer since 1962. It went by the name of Champions' Cup until 2008.

Key to colors and symbols

| 1st or W | Winners |
| 2nd or RU | Runners-up |
| 3rd | Third place |
| Last | Last place |
| ♦ | League golden boot winner |
| | Highest average attendance |
| Italics | Ongoing competition |

Key to league record

- Season = The year and article of the season
- Div = Division/level on pyramid
- League = League name
- Pld = Games played
- W = Games won
- L = Games lost
- D = Games drawn
- GF = Goals for
- GA = Goals against
- GD = Goal difference
- Pts = Points
- PPG = Points per game
- Conf. = Conference position
- Overall = League position

Key to cup record

- DNE = Did not enter
- DNQ = Did not qualify
- NH = Competition not held or canceled
- QR = Qualifying round
- PR = Preliminary round
- GS = Group stage
- LP = League phase
- R1 = First round
- R2 = Second round
- R3 = Third round
- R4 = Fourth round
- R5 = Fifth round
- Ro32 = Round of 32
- Ro16 = Round of 16
- QF = Quarterfinals
- SF = Semifinals
- F = Final
- RU = Runners-up
- W = Winners

== Seasons ==
| Season | League | | | | | | | | | | | Position | | Playoffs | USOC | Continental / Other | | Average attendance | Top goalscorer(s) | |
| Season | Div | League | Pld | W | L | D | GF | GA | GD | Pts | PPG | Conf. | Overall | Playoffs | USOC | Continental / Other | | Average attendance | Player(s) | Goals |
|---|---|---|---|---|---|---|---|---|---|---|---|---|---|---|---|---|---|---|---|---|
| 1975 | 1 | NASL | 22 | 16 | 6 | 0 | 43 | 27 | +16 | 48 | 2.19 | 1st | 1st | RU | DNE | DNE | | 14,503 | (England) Peter Withe | 18 |
| 1976 | 1 | NASL | 24 | 8 | 16 | 0 | 23 | 41 | –18 | 24 | 1.00 | 9th | 18th | DNQ | DNE | DNE | | 20,166 | (England) Tony Betts | 6 |
| 1977 | 1 | NASL | 26 | 10 | 16 | 0 | 39 | 42 | –3 | 30 | 1.15 | 9th | 15th | DNQ | DNE | DNE | | 13,208 | (Scotland) Stewart Scullion | 11 |
| 1978 | 1 | NASL | 30 | 20 | 10 | 0 | 50 | 36 | +14 | 60 | 2.00 | 3rd | 4th | SF | DNE | DNE | | 11,803 | (Bermuda) Clyde Best | 14 |
| 1979 | 1 | NASL | 30 | 11 | 19 | 0 | 50 | 75 | –25 | 33 | 1.10 | 12th | 19th | DNQ | DNE | DNE | | 13,018 | (Scotland) John Bain (Bermuda) Clyde Best | 8 |
| 1980 | 1 | NASL | 32 | 15 | 17 | 0 | 50 | 53 | –3 | 45 | 1.41 | 9th | 16th | DNQ | DNE | DNE | | 10,210 | (Bermuda) Clyde Best | 11 |
| 1981 | 1 | NASL | 32 | 17 | 15 | 0 | 52 | 49 | +3 | 51 | 1.59 | 3rd | 12th | R1 | DNE | DNE | | 10,516 | (Scotland) John Bain | 12 |
| 1982 | 1 | NASL | 32 | 14 | 18 | 0 | 49 | 44 | +5 | 42 | 1.31 | 4th | 10th | DNQ | DNE | DNE | | 8,786 | (England) Ron Futcher | 13 |
| 1983 | No club existed | | | | | | | | | | | | | | | | | | | |
| 1984 | No club existed | | | | | | | | | | | | | | | | | | | |
| 1985 | 3 | WACS | 7 | 1 | 4 | 2 | 8 | 16 | −8 | 5 | 0.71 | N/A | 4th | − | DNE | DNE | | − | N/A | N/A |
| 1986 | 3 | WSA | 14 | 6 | 6 | 2 | 19 | 22 | −3 | 20 | 1.43 | N/A | 3rd | − | DNE | DNE | | − | (United States) Brent Goulet | 9♦ |
| 1987 | 3 | WSA | 10 | 5 | 5 | 0 | 9 | 15 | –6 | 15 | 1.50 | N/A | 4th | DNQ | DNE | DNE | | − | 3 players tied | 2 |
| 1988 | 3 | WSA | 12 | 1 | 11 | 0 | 16 | 32 | –16 | 3 | 0.25 | N/A | 6th | DNQ | DNE | DNE | | – | (United States) Scott Benedetti | 8♦ |
| 1989 | 2 | WSL | 16 | 11 | 5 | 0 | 32 | 25 | +7 | 33 | 2.06 | 2nd | 3rd | SF | DNE | DNE | | – | (United States) Scott Benedetti | 8 |
| 1990 | 2 | APSL | 20 | 10 | 10 | 0 | 42 | 36 | +6 | 30 | 1.50 | 4th | 8th | DNQ | DNE | DNE | | – | (United States) Shawn Medved | 10 |
| 1991– 2000 | No club existed | | | | | | | | | | | | | | | | | | | |
| 2001 | 2 | A-League | 26 | 13 | 10 | 3 | 41 | 38 | +3 | 42 | 1.62 | 4th | 10th | QF | QR1 | DNE | | 5,974 | (United States) Mark Baena | 15 |
| 2002 | 2 | A-League | 28 | 13 | 12 | 3 | 47 | 39 | +8 | 42 | 1.50 | 4th | 8th | R1 | QR1 | DNE | | 6,261 | (Syria) Fadi Afash (United States) McKinley Tennyson | 18♦ |
| 2003 | 2 | A-League | 28 | 15 | 11 | 2 | 39 | 33 | +6 | 47 | 1.68 | 5th | 10th | DNQ | QR1 | DNE | | 5,871 | (Mexico) Byron Alvarez | 12 |
| 2004 | 2 | A-League | 28 | 18 | 7 | 3 | 58 | 30 | +28 | 57 | 2.04 | 1st | 1st | QF | Ro16 | DNE | | 5,281 | (Mexico) Byron Alvarez | 18 |
| 2005 | 2 | USL-1 | 28 | 10 | 9 | 9 | 40 | 42 | −2 | 39 | 1.39 | N/A | 5th | QF | Ro16 | DNE | | 5,553 | (United States) Dan Antoniuk | 14 |
| 2006 | 2 | USL-1 | 28 | 7 | 15 | 6 | 25 | 39 | –14 | 27 | 0.96 | N/A | 11th | DNQ | R3 | DNE | | 5,575 | (United States) Luke Kreamalmeyer | 9 |
| 2007 | 2 | USL-1 | 28 | 14 | 5 | 9 | 32 | 18 | +14 | 51 | 1.82 | N/A | 2nd | SF | R2 | DNE | | 6,794 | (United States) Andrew Gregor | 9 |
| 2008 | 2 | USL-1 | 30 | 7 | 13 | 10 | 26 | 33 | –7 | 31 | 1.03 | N/A | 11th | DNQ | R1 | DNQ | | 8,567 | (United States) Chris Brown | 9 |
| 2009 | 2 | USL-1 | 30 | 16 | 4 | 10 | 45 | 19 | +26 | 58 | 1.93 | N/A | 1st | SF | Ro16 | DNQ | | 9,734 | (Guinea) Mandjou Keita | 14 |
| 2010 | 2 | D2 Pro | 30 | 13 | 7 | 10 | 34 | 23 | +11 | 46 | 1.63 | 3rd | 3rd | QF | Ro16 | DNQ | | 10,727 | (United States) Ryan Pore | 15 |
| 2011 | 1 | MLS | 34 | 11 | 14 | 9 | 40 | 48 | −8 | 42 | 1.24 | 6th | 12th | DNQ | QR2 | DNQ | | 18,827 | (United States) Kenny Cooper (United States) Jack Jewsbury | 8 |
| 2012 | 1 | MLS | 34 | 8 | 16 | 10 | 34 | 56 | –22 | 34 | 1.00 | 8th | 17th | DNQ | Ro16 | DNQ | | 20,438 | (Scotland) Kris Boyd | 7 |
| 2013 | 1 | MLS | 34 | 14 | 5 | 15 | 54 | 33 | +21 | 57 | 1.68 | 1st | 3rd | SF | SF | DNQ | | 20,674 | (Argentina) Diego Valeri | 13 |
| 2014 | 1 | MLS | 34 | 12 | 9 | 13 | 61 | 52 | +9 | 49 | 1.44 | 6th | 11th | DNQ | QF | CONCACAF Champions League | GS | 20,744 | (Argentina) Diego Valeri | 11 |
| 2015 | 1 | MLS | 34 | 15 | 11 | 8 | 41 | 39 | +2 | 53 | 1.56 | 3rd | 5th | W | Ro16 | DNQ | | 21,144 | (Nigeria) Fanendo Adi | 18 |
| 2016 | 1 | MLS | 34 | 12 | 14 | 8 | 48 | 53 | −5 | 44 | 1.29 | 7th | 12th | DNQ | Ro16 | CONCACAF Champions League | GS | 21,144 | (Nigeria) Fanendo Adi | 18 |
| 2017 | 1 | MLS | 34 | 15 | 11 | 8 | 60 | 50 | +10 | 53 | 1.56 | 1st | 6th | QF | R4 | DNQ | | 21,144 | (Argentina) Diego Valeri | 21 |
| 2018 | 1 | MLS | 34 | 15 | 10 | 9 | 54 | 48 | +6 | 54 | 1.59 | 5th | 8th | RU | QF | DNQ | | 21,144 | (Argentina) Sebastián Blanco (Argentina) Diego Valeri | 14 |
| 2019 | 1 | MLS | 34 | 14 | 13 | 7 | 49 | 48 | +1 | 49 | 1.44 | 6th | 11th | R1 | SF | DNQ | | 25,218 | (Argentina) Brian Fernández | 15 |
| 2020 | 1 | MLS | 23 | 11 | 6 | 6 | 46 | 35 | +11 | 39 | 1.70 | 3rd | 8th | R1 | NH | Leagues Cup MLS is Back Tournament | NH W | 25,368 | (United States) Jeremy Ebobisse (Argentina) Diego Valeri | 9 |
| 2021 | 1 | MLS | 34 | 17 | 13 | 4 | 56 | 52 | +4 | 55 | 1.65 | 4th | 5th | RU | NH | CONCACAF Champions League | QF | 21,285 | (Chile) Felipe Mora | 15 |
| 2022 | 1 | MLS | 34 | 11 | 10 | 13 | 53 | 53 | 0 | 46 | 1.35 | 8th | 15th | DNQ | Ro32 | DNQ | | 23,341 | (Colombia) Dairon Asprilla | 10 |
| 2023 | 1 | MLS | 34 | 11 | 13 | 10 | 46 | 58 | –12 | 43 | 1.26 | 10th | 18th | DNQ | Ro32 | Leagues Cup | Ro32 | 23,103 | (Brazil) Evander | 11 |
| 2024 | 1 | MLS | 34 | 12 | 11 | 11 | 65 | 56 | +9 | 47 | 1.38 | 9th | 15th | PR | DNE | Leagues Cup | Ro32 | 22,485 | (Uruguay) Jonathan Rodríguez | 16 |
| 2025 | 1 | MLS | 34 | 11 | 12 | 11 | 41 | 48 | –7 | 44 | 1.29 | 8th | 17th | R1 | Ro16 | Leagues Cup | LP | 25,218 | (Venezuela) Kevin Kelsy | 9 |
| Total | – | – | 954 | 414 | 371 | 169 | 1412 | 1341 | +71 | 1408 | 1.48 | – | – | – | – | — | | – | (Argentina) Diego Valeri | 100 |

1. Average attendance only includes statistics from regular season matches.
2. Top goalscorer(s) includes all goals scored in the regular season, playoffs, U.S. Open Cup, MLS is Back Tournament, CONCACAF Champions Cup, Leagues Cup, FIFA Club World Cup, and other competitive continental matches.
3. Points and PPG have been adjusted from non-traditional to traditional scoring systems for seasons prior to 2003 to more effectively compare historical team performance across seasons.
