= 1989 Western Soccer League =

Western Soccer League 1989 season
- Season: 1989
- Champions: San Diego Nomads (2nd title)
- Premiers: San Diego Nomads (2nd title)
- Top goalscorer: Steve Corpening (11 goals)

Final league standings for the 1989 Western Soccer League season.

== League standings ==
=== North Division ===
Pos	Team	Pld	W	L	GF	GA	GD	BP	Pts	Qualification
1	San Francisco Bay Blackhawks	16	11	5	37	26	+11	27	98	Playoffs
2	Portland Timbers	16	11	5	32	25	+7	21	92	Playoffs
3	Seattle Storm	16	10	6	32	23	+9	21	87	
4	Sacramento Senators	16	3	13	20	43	−23	9	40	

=== South Division ===
Pos	Team	Pld	W	L	GF	GA	GD	BP	Pts	Qualification
1	San Diego Nomads (C)	16	12	4	30	18	+12	23	99	Playoffs
2	Los Angeles Heat	16	10	6	35	19	+16	15	81	Playoffs
3	Real Santa Barbara	16	5	11	20	35	−15	10	51	
4	Arizona Condors	16	5	11	25	39	−14	9	50	
5	California Kickers	16	5	11	17	30	−13	1	42	

(C) Champions

== Playoffs ==
=== Bracket ===
Semifinals
1N	San Francisco Bay Blackhawks	1(4)
2S	Los Angeles Heat	1(2)
1S	San Diego Nomads	2
2N	Portland Timbers	1

1989 WSL Final
1N	San Francisco Bay Blackhawks	0
1S	San Diego Nomads	1

=== Semifinal 1 ===
July 29, 1989
7:30 P.M. PDT

San Francisco Bay Blackhawks (CA)	1–1	Los Angeles Heat (CA)
Steve Corpening 55:09'	Report 1 Report 2	Dale Ervine 87:53'
Penalties
? (penalty scored) ? (penalty scored) ? (penalty scored) ? (penalty missed); John Doyle (penalty scored)	4–2	(penalty scored) ? (penalty scored) ? (penalty missed) ? (penalty missed) ?

Newark Memorial Stadium, Newark, California
Attendance: 3,500
Referee: (USA)

=== Semifinal 2 ===
July 29, 1989
7:30 P.M. PDT

San Diego Nomads (CA)	2–1	Portland Timbers (OR)
Waad Hirmez 10.51' (pen.); Wade Webber 50:10' (o.g.)	Report	John Bain 40:15'

Aztec Bowl, San Diego, California
Attendance: 2,500
Referee: (USA)

=== Final ===
August 12, 1989
7:30 P.M. PDT

San Diego Nomads (CA)	1–0	San Francisco Bay Blackhawks (CA)
Paul Wright 49:07' (Nguyen)	Report

Aztec Bowl, San Diego, California
Attendance: 5,200
Referee: (USA)

== Points leaders ==
Rank	Scorer	Club	Goals	Assists	Points
1	Jerome Watson	San Diego Nomads	10	7	27
2	Steve Corpening	San Francisco Bay Blackhawks	11	2	24
3	Mark Kerlin	Arizona Condors	9	4	22
4	Wes Wade	Arizona Condors	10	1	21
5	Chance Fry	Seattle Storm	8	4	20
6	Jeff Hooker	Los Angeles Heat	7	5	19
7	Scott Benedetti	Portland Timbers	8	1	17
7	Steve Boardman	San Diego Nomads	7	3	17
9	Rob Baarts	Portland Timbers	7	0	14
9	Robert Lang	San Diego Nomads	7	0	14
9	Eddie Henderson	Seattle Storm	5	4	14
12	Dave Palic	San Francisco Bay Blackhawks	6	1	13
12	Thien Nguyen	San Diego Nomads	3	7	13
14	Brent Goulet	Seattle Storm	6	0	12
14	Steve Petuskey	Sacramento Senators	5	2	12
14	Dominic Kinnear	San Francisco Bay Blackhawks	4	4	12
17	Chris John	F.C. Portland	5	1	11
17	Billy Thompson	Los Angeles Heat	5	1	11
17	Peter Hattrup	Seattle Storm	4	3	11
17	Jim Webber	Portland Timbers	4	3	11
17	Jim Gabarra	Los Angeles Heat	4	3	11
22	Cesar Plasencia	Sacramento Senators	3	4	10
22	Townsend Qin	San Francisco Bay Blackhawks	3	4	10

== Honors ==
- MVP: Kasey Keller
- Leading goal scorer: Steve Corpening
- Leading goalkeeper: Kasey Keller
- First Team All League

Goalkeeper: Kasey Keller
Defenders: Marcelo Balboa, John Doyle, Mike Lapper, Cle Kooiman
Midfielders: Dominic Kinnear, John Bain, Chris Henderson
Forwards: Scott Benedetti, Jeff Hooker, Mark Kerlin

- Second Team All League

Goalkeeper: Todd Elias
Defenders: Steve Boardman, Troy Dayak, Grant Gibbs, Arturo Velazco
Midfielders: Jim Gabarra, Jerome Watson
Forwards: Steve Corpening, Brent Goulet, Eddie Henderson, Wes Wade

== 1989 National Professional Soccer Championship ==
In anticipation of a proposed merger, which eventually took place the following year, the WSL champions faced off against the American Soccer League champions in the 1989 National Pro Soccer Championship on September 9 at Spartan Stadium in San Jose, California. The matched marked the first time since 1984 that an undisputed national champion of professional soccer was crowned in the U.S.

=== Match report ===
September 9, 1989
7:30 PST

San Diego Nomads (California)	1–3	(Florida) Fort Lauderdale Strikers
Watson 73:13' (Nguyen); Ortiz (yellow card) 86:10'	Report	Moreland (yellow card) 44:40'; Eichmann 74:24' (Alonso); Edwards 84:40' (Carrera); Carrera 89:00' (Moreland)

Spartan Stadium, San Jose, California
Attendance: 8,632
Referee: Levon Baladjanian
