= Portland Timbers (1985–1990) =

Soccer team

- Full name: Portland Timbers
- Nickname: The Timbers
- Founded: 1985 (as F.C. Portland)
- Dissolved: 1990
- Stadium: Civic Stadium; Portland, Oregon
- League: Western Soccer Alliance / American Professional Soccer League

Portland Timbers, previously known as F.C. Portland, came into existence in 1985 as an independent U.S. soccer team based in Portland, Oregon. In 1989, the team adopted the name Portland Timbers. Portland was composed of both professional and amateur players. The amateur players largely came from local Portland amateur leagues. It played its games in Portland's Civic Stadium.

== History ==
=== 1985 – Western Alliance Challenge Series ===
In 1985, F.C. Portland joined with three other independent clubs, the U.S. based F.C. Seattle and San Jose Earthquakes and the Canadian Victoria Riptides in a home and away round robin tournament, known as the Western Alliance Challenge Series. The four teams also played the Canadian Edmonton Brick Men and the Canada national team. The games against the Brick Men counted in the standings which determined the end of series champions.

F.C. Portland had the honor of hosting the first game of the series, against Seattle. The game, played in Portland's Civic Stadium, attracted 2,906 fans.

F.C. Portland also played a game against the Houston Dynamos in Houston.

=== 1986 – Western Soccer Alliance ===
After the success of 1985, the three U.S. teams elected to form a league, which they named the Western Soccer Alliance. While the Victoria Riptides opted out of the league, the Edmonton Brick Men joined the alliance, along with the Hollywood Kickers, Los Angeles Heat and San Diego Nomads. The teams continued the first year practice of playing outside teams (Manchester City and Dundee FC this year) with results counting in the alliance standings.

F.C. Portland saw a significant improvement over the previous season. Behind the production of forwards Brent Goulet (league leading 9 goals and 2 assists), and Mark Miller (7 goals and 5 assists), the team finished second in the standings with a 6-6-2 record. At the time, Goulet played for Warner Pacific College, a local school. He played with F.C. Portland as an amateur.

In 1986, former Timbers player Clive Charles began coaching the University of Portland (U.P.) men's soccer team, bringing this team to national prominence. This led to an infusion of U.P. players into F.C. Portland in later years.

=== 1987 – Brent Goulet MVP ===
In 1987, Edmonton dropped from the alliance to join the Canadian Soccer League and the Hollywood Kickers changed their name to the California Kickers. The league also reduced the number of games from 12 to 10. Despite the Brent Goulet's outstanding play, which led to his selection as the season MVP, F.C. Portland finished fourth in the standings and missed out on the alliance's first playoff, won by the San Diego Nomads.

At the end of the season, the team lost Goulet when he finished his four years at Warner Pacific College and signed with British club AFC Bournemouth.

=== 1988 ===
This year saw F.C. Portland drop to the bottom of the end of year standings despite once again having the alliance's leading scorer, Scott Benedetti with 8 goals and no assists. At the time Benedetti was between his junior and senior year playing soccer for Clive Charles at the University of Portland. The alliance kept the same teams as the 1987 season, but played 12 games, including games against Canadian Soccer League teams, Calgary Kickers and Vancouver 86ers. F.C. Portland finished 1-11.

This year the alliance named an All Star team. Ironically, not only did Portland have the alliance's top scorer, but also had its goalkeeper, Todd Strobeck, named to the alliance's All Star team.

=== 1989 – New name: Portland Timbers ===
In 1989, F.C. Portland went through several changes. First, Art Dixon, a local businessman, took control of F.C. Portland and renamed it the Portland Timbers. Dixon was a long time Timbers fan, holding season tickets from 1979 through the team's last season in 1982. Dixon brought more than a name change, he also injected money and a higher level of professionalism into the team, bringing former Timbers great John Bain back as a player/coach. Then, the Western Soccer Alliance became the Western Soccer League (WSL). More importantly for Portland, the WSL added three new teams, Real Santa Barbara, Arizona Condors and Sacramento Senators. To accommodate the new teams, the Western Soccer League split into two divisions – North and South. The Portland Timbers joined the San Jose Earthquakes now known as the San Francisco Bay Blackhawks, the F.C. Seattle now known as the Seattle Storm and the new Sacramento Senators in the North Division.

Portland made yet another wild swing in the standings from the previous season. Improving from 1-11, Portland finished the year at 11-5 and tied with the Blackhawks for the North Division lead. The Blackhawks won the division championship, and the playoff berth, based on goal differential.

The team continued its tradition of placing its players on the end of year honors lists. Goalkeeper Kasey Keller was selected as the league's MVP. Additionally, Portland placed Keller, midfielder/coach John Bain and forward Scott Benedetti on the WSL All Star team. At the time, Keller was also playing NCAA soccer with the University of Portland.

=== 1990 – The final season ===
In February 1990, the WSL announced it had reached a merger agreement with the American Soccer League, which had teams along the east coast. The new league was named the American Professional Soccer League. The APSL was split into East and West Conferences, both with North and South Divisions. The Portland Timbers remained in the North Division, which also had the San Francisco Bay Blackhawks, Seattle Storm and newly established Salt Lake Sting and Colorado Foxes.

This year, Portland's final, the team finished with a 10-10 record and out of playoff contention. This was also the first year the team failed to garner any individual player honors. Its leading goal scorer, Shawn Medved with 10 goals and 2 assists, was seventh on the league's scoring list. Kasey Keller had also moved on after playing in the 1990 FIFA World Cup and then signing with British club Millwall and Scott Benedetti had transferred to Seattle.

At the end of the season, the high hopes which had come with the merger between the WSL and APSL crashed. Over half of the teams from the 1990 season, including Portland, would not return for the 1991 season. Team owner Art Dixon folded the team, having lost more than $500,000 over the two years he owned the team.

== Coaches ==
- Bernie Fagan 1985–1988
- John Bain 1989–1990

== League honors ==
MVP

- 1987 Brent Goulet
- 1989 Kasey Keller

Leading scorer

- 1986 Brent Goulet
- 1988 Scott Benedetti

Top Goalkeeper

- 1989 Kasey Keller

First Team All Star

- 1988 Todd Strobeck
- 1989 Kasey Keller, John Bain, Scott Benedetti

== Record ==
This is a complete list of seasons for the WSL/APSL club. For a season-by-season history including the currentPortland Timbers MLS franchise, see List of Portland Timbers seasons.

Season	League											Position		Playoffs	USOC	Continental	Average attendance	Top goalscorer(s)	
Season	Div	League	Pld	W	L	D	GF	GA	GD	Pts	PPG	Conf.	Overall	Playoffs	USOC	Continental	Average attendance	Name	Goals
1985	3	WACS	7	1	4	2	8	16	−8	5	0.71	N/A	4th	−	DNE	Ineligible	−	N/A	N/A
1986	3	WSA	14	6	6	2	19	22	−3	20	1.43	N/A	3rd	−	DNE	Ineligible	−	(United States) Brent Goulet	9
1987	3	WSA	10	5	5	0	9	15	–6	15	1.50	N/A	4th	DNQ	DNE	Ineligible	−	3 players tied	2
1988	3	WSA	12	1	11	0	16	32	–16	3	0.25	N/A	6th	DNQ	DNE	Ineligible	–	(United States) Scott Benedetti	8
1989	2	WSL	16	11	5	0	32	25	+7	33	2.06	2nd	3rd	SF	DNE	Ineligible	–	(United States) Scott Benedetti	8
1990	2	APSL	20	10	10	0	42	36	+6	30	1.50	4th	8th	DNQ	DNE	Ineligible	–	(United States) Shawn Medved	10
Total	–	–	79	34	41	4	126	146	–20	106	1.34	–	–	–	–	—	–	(United States) Scott Benedetti	18

1. Avg. attendance include statistics from league matches only.
2. Top goalscorer(s) includes all goals scored in League, League Playoffs, U.S. Open Cup, CONCACAF Champions League, FIFA Club World Cup, and other competitive continental matches.
3. Points and PPG have been adjusted from non-traditional to traditional scoring systems for seasons after 1986 to more effectively compare historical team performance across seasons.

== All-time player roster ==
Goalkeepers

- Todd Strobeck: 1985–1988, 1990
- Jeff Gadowski: 1986
- Greg Maas: 1985–1990
- Glenn Rogers: 1987–1989
- Kasey Keller: 1989

Defenders

- Paul Henningsen: 1985–1986
- Mike dePinna: 1985–1990
- Tim Newton: 1985–1986
- Jim Riley: 1985-1986
- Grant Gibbs: 1985–1987
- Tohru Yamada: 1985, 1987–1989
- Grant Rowe: 1986–1987
- Wade Webber: 1986–1987, 1989
- Eric Phillipi: 1986–1990
- Gary Osterhage: 1987
- Blake Pavlich: 1987
- Garrett Smith: 1987–1989
- John Ballew: 1988
- Peter Cochran: 1988
- Chuck Codd: 1988
- Roger Gantz: 1988
- Jerome LaChance: 1988
- Trent Schultz: 1988
- Steve Ancheta: 1988–1989
- Jeff Brooks: 1989
- Trent Schultz: 1989
- Sam Singer: 1989
- Billy Crook: 1990
- Daryl Green: 1990
- Ian MacLean: 1990
- Bernd Strom: 1990

Midfielders

- Mike Iverzic: 1985
- Eric Knapp: 1985
- Ken Coplin: 1985–1986
- Dan House: 1985–1987
- Ezam Bayan: 1986–1988
- Joe Halloway: 1986–1988, 1990
- Steve Piercy: 1986–1987, 1990
- Robb Sakamoto: 1987–1988
- Horner Screws: 1987–1988
- Jim Weber: 1987, 1989
- Joey Leonetti: 1988
- Ignacio Baez: 1988–1989
- Dick McCormick: 1988–1990
- Souk Ngonethong: 1988–1990
- Paul Conway: 1989
- Neftali Gomez: 1989
- Doug Van de Brake: 1989
- John Bain: 1989–1990
- Tim Bartro: 1990
- Peter Hattrup: 1990
- Brian McManus: 1990
- Quinn Ross: 1990

Forwards

- Ronston Haylock: 1985
- Mark Miller: 1985–1986
- Jeff Fenske: 1985–1986, 1989
- Jess Guthrie: 1986
- Tony Hicker: 1985–1987
- Scott Benedetti: 1986–1989
- Brent Goulet: 1986–1987
- Mark Bioklund: 1987
- Jeff Enquist: 1987, 1990
- Jason Russ: 1987–1988
- Brian Bacon: 1988
- Clay Elrod: 1988
- Michael Macchione: 1988
- David Magistrale: 1988
- Rob Baarts: 1989
- Paul Goldsbrough: 1989
- Robert Lang: 1989
- Ron Skov: 1989
- Shawn Medved: 1990
- Rob Paterson: 1990
