= 1985 F.C. Portland season =

F.C. Portland
1985 season
- Owner: Unknown
- Head coach: Bernie Fagan
- Stadium: Civic Stadium
- WACS: 4th
- U.S. Open Cup: Did not enter

The 1985 season was the first season of existence for the second incarnation of the Portland Timbers. The club was then branded as F.C. Portland for the season and competed in the Western Alliance Challenge Series. Including the first Timbers franchise, this was the ninth season all together.

== Western Alliance Challenge Series ==
=== Standings ===
Place	Team	GP	W	L	T	GF	GA	Points
1	San Jose Earthquakes	7	4	1	2	10	9	13
2	F.C. Seattle	7	3	1	3	16	11	10
3	Victoria Riptide	7	3	1	3	12	13	10
4	F.C. Portland	7	1	2	4	8	15	5

=== League results ===
June 15, 1985 1	Victoria Riptides	3–2	F.C. Portland	Victoria, British Columbia
14:00	John Noble 45+', 83'; Ken Andrews 78'	Report 1 Report 2	Tim Newton 33'; Brent Goulet 65'	Stadium: Royal Athletic Park; Attendance: 200

July 3, 1985 2	F.C. Portland	1–6	F.C. Seattle	Portland, Oregon
	Miller 11'	Report	2' Fuegman; 13' Schmetzer; 18', 36', 88' Raney; Fewing	Stadium: Civic Stadium; Attendance: 2,906
Note: Largest margin of victory by any club in the Seattle Sounders–Portland Timbers rivalry

July 10, 1985 3	F.C. Portland	0–0	Canada	Portland, Oregon
		Report		Stadium: Civic Stadium; Attendance: 1,945

July 13, 1985 4	San Jose Earthquakes	3–2	F.C. Portland	San Jose, California
	Chris Dangerfield, Dzung Tran	Report		Stadium: Spartan Stadium

July 17, 1985 5	F.C. Portland	2–1	San Jose Earthquakes	Portland, Oregon
	Brent Goulet, 67'	Report	Dzung Tran 35'	Stadium: Civic Stadium

July 20, 1985 6	Victoria Riptides	2–1	FC Portland	Victoria, British Columbia
	Ken Garraway 16'; Greg Kern 67' (pen.)	Report	Brent Goulet 37'	Stadium: Royal Athletic Park; Attendance: 400

July 31, 1985 7	F.C. Seattle	0–0	F.C. Portland	Seattle
		Report		Stadium: Memorial Stadium; Attendance: 1,000

Source.
