= 1982 Portland Timbers season =

Portland Timbers
1982 season
- Owner: Louisiana-Pacific
- Head coach: (Wales) Vic Crowe
- Stadium: Civic Stadium
- NASL: Division: 4th Playoffs: Did not qualify
- U.S. Open Cup: Did not enter
- Top goalscorer: (England) Ron Futcher (13 goals)
- Highest home attendance: 15,233 vs. NYC (May 19)
- Lowest home attendance: 5,888 vs. FTL (Jun 2)
- Average home league attendance: 8,786

The 1982 Portland Timbers season was the eighth and final season for the Portland Timbers in the now-defunct North American Soccer League (1968–1984). The team was dissolved at the conclusion of the 1982 North American Soccer League season.

== Squad ==
The 1982 squad was:

Note: Flags indicate national team as defined under FIFA eligibility rules; some limited exceptions apply. Players may hold more than one non-FIFA nationality.

No.	Pos.	Nation	Player
1	GK	YUG	Dragan Radovich
2	DF	USA	Glenn Myernick
3	FW	SCO	Willie Donachie
4	DF	ENG	Gary Collier
5	DF	ENG	Dave Bennett
6	MF	SCO	John Bain
7	FW	CAN	Dale Mitchell
8	FW	IRL	Terry Donovan
9	FW	ENG	Ron Futcher
10	MF	USA	Carl Strong
11	FW	ENG	Stuart Lee

No.	Pos.	Nation	Player
12	FW	ENG	Willie Anderson
14	DF	CAN	Bruce Gant
15	MF	ENG	John Pratt
16	MF	CAN	Brian Gant
17	MF	CAN	Greg Ion
18	DF	ENG	Bernie Fagan
21	FW	NIR	Jimmy Kelly
22	GK	NIR	Bill Irwin
23	DF	KOR	Young-Jeung Cho
24	MF	USA	Chris Hellenkamp
25	MF	SCO	Pat McMahon

== North American Soccer League ==
=== Western Division standings ===
Pos	Club	Pld	W	L	GF	GA	GD	Pts
1	Seattle Sounders	32	18	14	72	48	+24	166
2	San Diego Sockers	32	19	13	71	54	+17	162
3	Vancouver Whitecaps	32	20	12	58	48	+10	160
4	Portland Timbers	32	14	18	49	44	+5	122
5	San Jose Earthquakes	32	13	19	47	62	−15	114
6	Edmonton Drillers	32	11	21	38	65	−27	93

Pld = Matches played; W = Matches won; L = Matches lost; GF = Goals for; GA = Goals against; GD = Goal difference; Pts = Points

=== Exhibition results ===
Date	Opponent	Venue	Result	Attendance	Scorers
March 28, 1982	Edmonton Drillers	Victoria, BC	1–0	~1,500	
April 4, 1982	Edmonton Drillers	Autzen Stadium	2-2	~1,200	Bain, Mitchell

=== League results ===
Date	Opponent	Venue	Result	Attendance	Scorers
April 9, 1982	Seattle Sounders	A	1–0	14,286	Bain
April 17, 1982	Chicago Sting	A	2*–1 (OT)	13,243	Mitchell
April 24, 1982	Vancouver Whitecaps	A	1–2	18,346	Futcher
May 2, 1982	Vancouver Whitecaps	H	5–0	14,144	Anderson, Mitchell, Futcher (3)
May 8, 1982	Montreal Manic	H	0–1	11,786	
May 15, 1982	Tampa Bay Rowdies	A	2*–1 (OT)	18,237	Futcher
May 19, 1982	New York Cosmos	H	2–3	15,233	Bain (2)
May 26, 1982	San Jose Earthquakes	H	0–1	8,286	
May 29, 1982	Vancouver Whitecaps	A	0–1	17,721	
June 2, 1982	Ft. Lauderdale Strikers	H	3–0	5,888	Bain, Mitchell, Futcher
June 5, 1982	Ft. Lauderdale Strikers	A	0–1	10,276	
June 8, 1982	Jacksonville Tea Men	A	0–1	7,667	
June 12, 1982	San Diego Sockers	H	1–2* (OT)	7,768	Donovan
June 16, 1982	Toronto Blizzard	A	0–1	4,366	
June 20, 1982	Jacksonville Tea Men	H	2–0	6,688	Futcher (2)
June 23, 1982	Chicago Sting	H	1–2 (OT)	8,455	Futcher
June 26, 1982	Toronto Blizzard	H	2–1	6,206	Bri. Gant, Futcher
June 30, 1982	Edmonton Drillers	A	0–1	2,876	
July 4, 1982	San Diego Sockers	H	3–1	10,542	Bain, Mitchell (2)
July 6, 1982	Tulsa Roughnecks	A	0–4	14,090	
July 10, 1982	San Jose Earthquakes	A	2–0	12,780	Mitchell (2)
July 14, 1982	Edmonton Drillers	H	3–0	7,658	o.g., Anderson, Futcher
July 18, 1982	New York Cosmos	A	2–6	24,387	Bain, Bri. Gant
July 21, 1982	Montreal Manic	A	0–1	15,401	
July 24, 1982	Seattle Sounders	H	1–4	8,488	Mitchell
July 28, 1982	Tulsa Roughnecks	H	2–0	6,058	Bain, Mitchell
July 31, 1982	Seattle Sounders	A	0–3	13,380	
August 4, 1982	San Diego Sockers	A	3–5	8,019	Bain (2), Bru. Gant
August 8, 1982	Tampa Bay Rowdies	H	5–0	6,620	Bain, Mitchell, Cho, Lee, Bennett
August 14, 1982	San Jose Earthquakes	A	2–0	13,101	Futcher, Bennett
August 18, 1982	Edmonton Drillers	H	4–0	7,246	Bain (2), Futcher, Bennett
August 22, 1982	Seattle Sounders	H	0–1	9,517	

* = Shootout win
