= Portland Pilots men's soccer =

American college soccer team

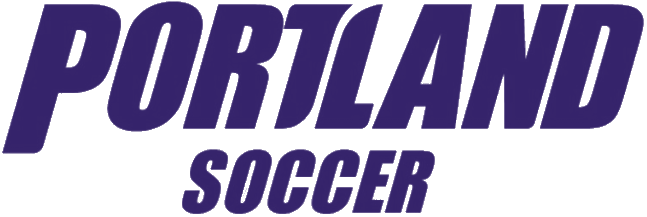
- University: University of Portland
- Head coach: Nick Carlin-Voigt
- Conference: WCC
- Location: Portland, Oregon
- Stadium: Merlo Field (capacity: 4,892)
- Nickname: Pilots
- Colors: Purple and white
Home	Away

NCAA Tournament College Cup
- 1988, 1995

NCAA Tournament Quarterfinals
- 1988, 1995, 2022, 2025

NCAA Tournament Round of 16
- 1988, 1995, 2001, 2009, 2022, 2025

NCAA Tournament appearances
- 1988, 1989, 1990, 1991, 1992, 1993, 1995, 1999, 2001, 2002, 2003, 2004, 2007, 2009, 2016, 2018, 2021, 2022, 2023, 2025

Conference Regular Season championships
- 1988, 1989, 1990, 1992, 2002, 2016

The Portland Pilots men's soccer team represents the University of Portland in NCAA Division I men's soccer competitions. The Pilots compete in the West Coast Conference (WCC) and are coached by Nick Carlin-Voigt.

== Players ==
=== Notable alumni ===
- Kasey Keller
- Steve Cherundolo
- Luis Robles
- Heath Pearce
- Conor Casey
- Benji Michel
- Noah Beck
- Josh Simpson
- Nate Jaqua
- Michael Gavin
- Collen Warner
- Logan Emory
- Wade Webber
- Joey Leonetti
- Mark Miller
- Greg Maas
- Scott Benedetti
- Ian McLean

== Honors ==
- WCC Regular Season (6): 1988, 1989, 1990, 1992, 2002, 2016
