= 1986 Western Soccer Alliance =

Western Soccer Alliance
- Season: 1986
- Teams: 7
- Champions: Hollywood Kickers (1st title)
- Top goalscorer: Brent Goulet (9 goals)

History of the 1986 Western Soccer Alliance season.

== History ==
After the success of the 1985 Western Alliance Challenge Series, three of the teams from that series, F.C. Seattle, F.C. Portland and the San Jose Earthquakes established the Western Soccer Alliance. The Victoria Riptide, a participant in 1985, did not return but was replaced by the Edmonton Brick Men which had played games against the series team in 1985. These teams were joined by the Hollywood Kickers, Los Angeles Heat and San Diego Nomads expanded the alliance from its Northwest Pacific roots into southern California. The Alliance played a regular season schedule only.

Continuing the previous season's tradition of playing with a guest team - in that year, the Edmonton Brick Men, who had subsequently joined the league proper for 1986 - the Western Soccer Alliance this time sought two guest teams, turning this time to the United Kingdom. The two teams recruited were the English Football League First Division side Manchester City and Scottish Premier Division side Dundee, who each played one away match against each team and played no home fixtures. In the event, F.C. Portland were unable to play their game against Manchester City, instead rescheduling their game for later in the season, and replacing City - who had returned to England for the start of their own season - with a team composed of former Portland Timbers players.

== League standings ==
Pos	Team	Pld	W	T	L	GF	GA	GD	Pts
1	Hollywood Kickers (C)	14	8	4	2	21	13	+8	28
2	F.C. Seattle	14	6	2	6	20	19	+1	20
3	F.C. Portland	14	6	2	6	19	22	−3	20
4	Los Angeles Heat	14	4	5	5	15	14	+1	17
5	San Diego Nomads	14	4	4	6	18	20	−2	16
6	San Jose Earthquakes	14	3	4	7	23	32	−9	13
7	Edmonton Brick Men	14	3	3	8	18	28	−10	12

Source: A-League Archive
Rules for classification: 1) points; 2) goal difference; 3) number of goals scored.
(C) Champions

=== Results ===
Home \ Away	EDM	POR	SEA	HOL	LAH	SDN	SJE
Edmonton Brick Men		3–0	4–2	1–2	1–1	0–2	3–3
F.C. Portland	3–1		0–2	1–1	2–1	2–0	3–1
F.C. Seattle	1–0	1–1		0–1	2–1	2–1	1–0
Hollywood Kickers	0–0	1–0	3–2		1–0	0–0	2–3
Los Angeles Heat	1–0	4–1	1–0	0–1		0–2	1–1
San Diego Nomads	4–0	1–2	3–3	0–0	0–2		1–1
San Jose Earthquakes	3–4	2–0	1–3	2–6	2–2	4–1	

Source: A-League Archive
Legend: Blue = home team win; Yellow = draw; Red = away team win.

== Points leaders ==
Rank	Scorer	Club	Goals	Assists	Points
1	Brent Goulet	F.C. Portland	9	2	20
2	Mark Miller	F.C. Portland	7	5	20
3	Chance Fry	San Jose Earthquakes	8	2	18
4	Dennis Gunnell	F.C. Seattle	7	1	15
5	Vilmar Marquez	Edmonton Brick Men	5	5	15
6	Rob Ryerson	San Diego Nomads	6	0	12
7	Derek Sanderson	San Jose Earthquakes	5	2	12
8	Michael Brady	Los Angeles Heat	5	1	11
9	Norm Odinga	Edmonton Brick Men	5	1	11
10	Steve McCargo	San Jose Earthquakes	5	0	10

== Honors ==
- MVP: Paul Caligiuri
- Leading goal scorer: Brent Goulet
- Leading goalkeeper: Lorenzo Caccialanza
- First Team All League

Goalkeeper: Lorenzo Caccialanza
Defenders: Dale Ervine, Paul Krumpe, Martín Vásquez
Midfielders: Paul Caligiuri, Dennis Gunnel, Hugo Perez
Forwards: Chance Fry, Brent Goulet, Jeff Hooker, Mark Miller

- Second Team All League

Goalkeeper: Todd Strobeck
Defenders: Mark Arquette, Jens Ole-Knudsen, Scott Murray, Tim Schulz
Midfielders: Drew Ferguson, Doug Swanson
Forwards: Tim Barto, Ross Ongaro, Rob Ryerson, Dzung Tran
