= Steve Ancheta =

American soccer defender

Personal information
- Height: 5 ft 8 in (1.73 m)
- Position: Defender

College career
Years	Team	Apps	(Gls)
1988–1989	Warner Pacific Knights		
1990–1991	Oregon State Beavers		

Senior career*
Years	Team	Apps	(Gls)
1988–1989	Portland Timbers		
1992	Portland Mailing (indoor)		

Managerial career
- 1995–2010: FC Portland Academy
- 1999–2002: Barlow Bruins
- 2004–2010: Central Catholic Rams
- 2011–2018: Western Oregon Wolves (women)
- 2019–: West Linn Lions
- * Club domestic league appearances and goals

Steve Ancheta is a former U.S. soccer defender who played two seasons in the Western Soccer Alliance. Ancheta is currently the head girls coach at Portland Christian High School.

== Player ==
Ancheta graduated from Reynolds High School. He then attended Warner Pacific College, playing on the men's soccer team in 1988 and 1989. He then transferred to Oregon State University for the 1990 and 1991 season. In 1988, he played as an amateur with the semi-professional F.C. Portland of the Western Soccer Alliance. In 1989, Art Dixon, owner of the original Portland Timbers, purchased F.C. Portland and renamed it the Timbers. Ancheta played the 1989 season with the renamed Timbers. In 1992, he played for Portland Mailing, an amateur indoor team coached by John Bain.

== Coach ==
Ancheta has spent the years since retiring as a player coaching on the youth level. In 1995, he was hired as a staff coach with the F.C. Portland Academy. In 1999, he was hired by Sam Barlow High School as the boys soccer coach. In 2002, he left Barlow and in 2004 moved to Central Catholic High School. In 2007, he took his team to the Oregon 6A high school soccer championship, winning Coach of the Year honors as well. He was also on the staff of the F.C. Portland youth club during his time in Portland.

In July 2019, Ancheta joined West Linn High School as boys' head coach.
