= Grant Gibbs =

American soccer player

Personal information
- Full name: Grant Gibbs
- Date of birth: May 7, 1964 (age 62)
- Place of birth: United States
- Height: 6 ft 2 in (1.88 m)
- Position: Defender

College career
Years	Team	Apps	(Gls)
1982–1985	Warner Pacific Knights		

Senior career*
Years	Team	Apps	(Gls)
1985–1987	F.C. Portland		
1988–1990	Seattle Storm		
1991	Miami Freedom	6	(0)
- * Club domestic league appearances and goals as of 17:47, 24 February 2007 (UTC) ‡ National team caps and goals as of 7 December 2006

Grant Gibbs (born 1964) is a former U.S. soccer defender who spent his professional career in clubs F.C. Portland, Seattle Storm and Miami Freedom.

== Biography ==
Gibbs grew up in Federal Way, Washington, where he attended Thomas Jefferson High School. After graduating from high school in 1982, Gibbs attended Warner Pacific College. While in college, he played for F.C. Portland of the Western Soccer Alliance (WSA) from 1985 to 1987. In 1988, he moved to the Seattle Storm where he played until the end of the 1990 season. He was a first team All Star in 1988 and a second team All Star in 1989. In December 1989 and January 1990, he travelled to England where he trained with the lower division clubs Leyton Orient and AFC Bournemouth. When he was unable to secure a contract, he returned to Seattle for the 1990 season. The Storm folded at the end of the 1990 season and Gibbs then moved to the Miami Freedom of the American Professional Soccer League, which was formed by the merger of the WSA and American Soccer League.
