= Garrett Smith =

American soccer player and coach

Personal information
- Date of birth: December 14, 1967 (age 58)
- Place of birth: Seattle, Washington, United States
- Height: 5 ft 11 in (1.80 m)
- Position: Defender

Youth career
- 1986–1989: University of Portland

Senior career*
Years	Team	Apps	(Gls)
1989	Portland Timbers		
1990	Seattle Storm		
1990–1991	San Diego Sockers (indoor)	3	(0)
1993–1995	Portland Pride (indoor)		

Managerial career
- 1992–2002: University of Portland (assistant)
- 2003–2017: University of Portland
- * Club domestic league appearances and goals

Garrett Smith (born December 14, 1967) is an American former soccer defender who played professionally in the Western Soccer League, American Professional Soccer League, Major Indoor Soccer League and Continental Indoor Soccer League. Since 1992, he has served as an assistant coach with the University of Portland's men's and women's soccer teams. In 2003, he became the head coach of the women's team, winning the 2005 National Championship. He was 2007 NCAA Coach of the Year.

== High school and college ==
Smith attended Nathan Hale High School where he played on the school's soccer team while also playing with the Washington State U-19 State team. He then attended the University of Portland where he played on the men's soccer team under Clive Charles from 1986 to 1989. Smith was a 1989 first team All-West Coast Conference and a three time All-Northwest Collegiate Soccer Conference selection. The most Notable team of that era was the 1988 team which went 22–1, their only loss being a 1–0 loss in the semi-finals to eventual NCAA champions Indiana.

== Professional ==
While still in college, Smith played a single season with the Portland Timbers of the Western Soccer League in 1989. In 1990, he signed with the Seattle Storm of the American Professional Soccer League. On November 23, 1990, he signed with the San Diego Sockers of the Major Indoor Soccer League. When his contract expired at the end of the season, Smith left professional soccer. On April 28, 1993, the Portland Pride of the Continental Indoor Soccer League drafted Smith. He retired from professional soccer after the 1995 season.

== Coaching ==
In 1992, Smith was hired by the University of Portland as an assistant coach to Clive Charles for the women's soccer team. When Charles died from cancer in 2003, Smith was promoted to head coach. In 2005, he led the team to the NCAA Women's Soccer Championship. In 2007, he was named the NCAA Coach of the Year. In addition to his duties as head coach for the Pilot's women's team, Smith has served as the university's associate director for soccer since 2003. On November 7, 2017, Garrett Smith was let go by the University of Portland and was replaced by ex-US National Team player and former US Women's National Team assistant coach Michelle French.
