= Bill Andracki =

American soccer player (born 1969)

Personal information
- Full name: William Andracki
- Date of birth: May 25, 1969 (age 57)
- Place of birth: Prince William, Virginia, United States
- Height: 6 ft 0 in (1.83 m)
- Position: Goalkeeper

College career
Years	Team	Apps	(Gls)
1988–1989	Mercer County Vikings		
1990–1991	Rutgers Scarlet Knights		

Senior career*
Years	Team	Apps	(Gls)
1992–1993	Tampa Bay Rowdies	29	(0)
1992–1995	Cleveland Crunch (indoor)	55	(0)
1994	Atlanta Magic	18	(0)
1995	Atlanta Ruckus	18	(0)
1995–1996	Tampa Bay Terror (indoor)	29	(0)
1996	Chicago Power (indoor)	0	(0)
1996–2003	Rochester Raging Rhinos	98	(0)
1998	→ MetroStars (loan)	0	(0)
1998	→ Miami Fusion (loan)	1	(0)
2001	→ Atlanta Silverbacks (loan)	15	(0)
1996–1997	Philadelphia KiXX (indoor)	7	(0)
1997–2000	Buffalo Blizzard (indoor)	62	(0)
Total		339	(0)
- * Club domestic league appearances and goals

Bill Andracki (born May 25, 1969) is an American retired soccer goalkeeper who had an extensive professional career playing both indoor and outdoor soccer.

== Youth ==
In 1988 and 1989, Andracki attended Mercer County Community College, playing on the men's soccer team. He was a 1988 NJCAA First Team All American and was a member of the 1989 Junior College National Championship. He is a member of the Mercer County Community College Athletic Hall of Fame. In 2008, he was inducted into the NJCAA Hall of Fame. In 1990, he transferred to Rutgers University where he was a two-year starter on the men's soccer team. In 1990, Rutgers finished runners up to the UCLA Bruins in the NCAA Men's Division I Soccer Championship. In 1991, Andracki was a Third Team All American.

== Professional ==
In 1992, Andracki turned professional with the Tampa Bay Rowdies of the American Professional Soccer League. He was selected as the 1992 First Team Goalkeeper In addition to his outdoor career, Andracki spent several seasons playing indoor soccer. In September 1992, the Milwaukee Wave selected Andracki in the first round (ninth overall) of the National Professional Soccer League draft. A month later, the Wave traded Andracki, Tim Bartro and Mark Kerlin to the Cleveland Crunch in exchange for David Vaudreuil. Andracki spent three seasons with the Crunch, winning the 1994 NPSL championship with them. When the Rowdies folded following the 1993 season, Andracki moved to the Atlanta Magic of the USISL midway through the 1994 season. In 1995, he moved to the Atlanta Ruckus of the A-League. In June 1995, the Tampa Bay Terror selected Andracki in the NPSL Expansion Draft. He spent most of the season with the Terror, then was traded to the Chicago Power in exchange for Stuart Dobson in March 1996. He played no games for the Power. In the spring of 1996, Andracki signed with the Rochester Rhinos of the A-League. He would remain with the Rhinos until 2000. In 1996, the Rhinos went to the A-League finals where Andracki played most of the first half before suffering facial injuries when he hit the goalpost with his face saving a shot. Despite the injuries, Andracki returned on October 30, 1996, as the Rhinos fell to D.C. United in the 1996 U.S. Open Cup championship game. In the fall of 1996, he signed with the Philadelphia KiXX of the NPSL. In 1997, he moved to the Buffalo Blizzard. He spent two seasons with the Blizzard. In May 1998, the Rhinos loaned Andracki to the MetroStars of Major League Soccer when Tim Howard left briefly to play for the United States U-20 men's national soccer team. In September, the Rhinos again loaned out Andracki, this time to the Miami Fusion where he played in 1–0 loss to the Columbus Crew on September 10, 1998. In 2001, Andracki moved to the Atlanta Silverbacks on loan but was back with Rochester later in the season.
