= Steve Petuskey =

American soccer player

Steve Petusky
Personal information
- Full name: Stephen Andrew Petuskey
- Date of birth: July 16, 1961 (age 65)
- Place of birth: United States
- Height: 6 ft 1 in (1.85 m)
- Position: Midfielder

Youth career
- 1979–80: Cosumnes River College
- 1981–1982: Sacramento State Hornets

Senior career*
Years	Team	Apps	(Gls)
1989	Sacramento Senators		(5)
1990	San Francisco Bay Blackhawks		
1993–1994	Sacramento Knights (indoor)		
- * Club domestic league appearances and goals

Steve Petuskey is an American retired soccer player who played professionally in the American Professional Soccer League and Continental Indoor Soccer League. He is widely considered to be the finest soccer player of his era from the Sacramento area.

Petuskey played most of his prime in the Central California Soccer League (CCSL), first with Celtic F.C., coached by Fr. Michael Carroll, and then with Turn Verein, winning numerous league titles and one State Cup with the latter. Unfortunately, despite the presence of a few perennially strong teams, the CCSL was considered a level below its San Francisco and Los Angeles counterparts and Petuskey was ignored in the U.S. Men's National Team selection process in the lead up to the 1990 World Cup in Italy.

In 1979, Petusky graduated from Cordova High School. He attended and played for Cosumnes River College from 1979 to 1981, where he led the team to league titles in both years. He attended Sacramento State University, playing on the men's soccer team in 1981 and 1982. He was a 1982 NCAA Division II First Team All American. On December 11, 1996, Sacramento State inducted Petusky into its Hall of Fame. In 1989, Petuskey played for the Sacramento Senators of the Western Soccer League. In 1990, he moved to the San Francisco Bay Blackhawks of the American Professional Soccer League, which was formed by the merger of the Western Soccer League and American Soccer League. In 1993, Petuskey moved indoors with the Sacramento Knights of the Continental Indoor Soccer League. He played for the Knights in both 1993 and 1994. In 1994, he won the U.S. Open Cup with Greek-American A.C., scoring in the semi-finals.
