= Greg Maas =

American soccer player and coach

Personal information
- Date of birth: January 19, 1966 (age 60)
- Place of birth: Portland, Oregon, United States
- Height: 5 ft 11 in (1.80 m)
- Position: Goalkeeper

Youth career
- 1984–1987: Portland Pilots

Senior career*
Years	Team	Apps	(Gls)
1985–1988	F.C. Portland		
1989–1991	Portland Timbers		

Managerial career
- 2013–2021: Utah Valley University
- * Club domestic league appearances and goals

Greg Maas (born January 19, 1966, in Portland, Oregon) is a retired U.S. soccer goalkeeper who spent his youth, collegiate, and professional playing career in Portland. In 2024, he was inducted into the Utah Soccer Hall of Fame and also received the Oregon Youth Soccer Association Administrator of the Year award.

Maas serves as Technical Director of Oregon Youth Soccer (OYSA), where he leads player, coach, and program development for the organization’s 60,000 members. Based in Portland, Oregon, OYSA is a proud member of US Youth Soccer and U.S. Soccer. Prior to his current role at OYSA, Maas was the Technical Director & GM at Eastside Timbers, a 3,500-member Portland Timbers Alliance Club.

Maas also made history as the first-ever NCAA Division I men’s soccer head coach at Utah Valley University (UVU), starting the program from scratch in 2013 before the inaugural 2014 campaign in the Western Athletic Conference (WAC). Coach Maas turned the program into an immediate competitor in the WAC, earning an NCAA at-large berth in the team's second season in 2015 and claiming the WAC regular season championship in 2016. Maas finished his tenure at UVU with an impressive 67-44-10 record, and was named the 2016 WAC Coach of the Year. At Utah Valley, he produced 12 All-Region, 20 All-WAC, two Scholar All-Americans, 11 Academic All-District, three Academic All Americans and one All-American.

Maas also saw his program garner tremendous academic success under his leadership, with Utah Valley receiving the United Soccer Coaches Team Academic Award in every season of existence. The program also garnered three CoSIDA Academic All-America winners in Paul Hoffmeister (2016), Zach Maas (2019, 2020-21), and Mark Brown (2020–21). Zach Maas is the only Utah Valley student-athlete to have ever been named to the first team, and is also one of only six male student-athletes at the Division I level to receive the CoSIDA Academic All-America recognition multiple times.

Maas attended the University of Portland where he was a standout goalkeeper on the Pilot's soccer team from 1984 to 1987 playing under one of the most respected coaches in U.S. Soccer history—the late Clive Charles. Maas was the first professional goalkeeper to come out of the University of Portland; during the 1985 collegiate off season, he began playing with F.C. Portland of the Western Soccer Alliance (WSA). He would continue to play for F.C. Portland until it changed its name to the Portland Timbers in 1989. He remained with the Timbers until the team folded at the end of the 1990 season. On a side note, the WSA merged with the American Soccer League in 1990 to form the American Professional Soccer League.

Since retiring from playing, Maas has held various coaching director positions. From 1994 to 2001 he served as the Director of Coaching for Lake Oswego Soccer Club, 2001 to 2013 he served as the State Technical Director of Utah Youth Soccer Association and also served as the Real Salt Lake U-17 Head Coach from 2008 to 2012.

Maas holds the U.S. Soccer A License, National Goalkeeper License, and National Youth License, as well as the United Soccer Coaches International Premier Diploma. He serves as a coach educator for U.S. Soccer, US Youth Soccer, and United Soccer Coaches. Maas has served for more than 20 years as a coach within the US Youth Soccer Olympic Development Program (ODP) and is the current head coach of the US Youth Soccer ODP Boys 2014 National Team. As head coach of the Real Salt Lake U-17 Academy from 2008 to 2012, he led the team to the 2008 MLS U-17 Cup championship, a third-place finish in 2009, and a runner-up finish in 2010.

Greg and his wife, Angie, have two sons, Cody and Zach, and currently reside in Camas, Wa.
