= Robert Paterson (soccer) =

American soccer player

Rob Paterson
Personal information
- Full name: Robert Paterson
- Date of birth: October 17, 1967 (age 59)
- Place of birth: San Diego, California, United States
- Height: 5 ft 10 in (1.78 m)
- Position: Forward

College career
Years	Team	Apps	(Gls)
1987–1988	University of California, San Diego		
1989–1990	University of Evansville		

Senior career*
Years	Team	Apps	(Gls)
1987, 1989	San Diego Nomads		
1990	Portland Timbers	?	(8)
- * Club domestic league appearances and goals

Robert “Rob” Paterson (born October 17, 1967, in San Diego, California) is a former U.S. soccer forward who spent two seasons in the Western Soccer Alliance and one in the American Professional Soccer League.

Paterson began his collegiate career at San Diego State University in 1987. In 1988, he transferred to the University of Evansville where he played on the men's soccer team. He was part of the SDSU team which went to the semifinals of the NCAA Division I tournament. In 1989, Paterson was named a first team All American and was honored as the ISAA Player of the Year. He finished his two seasons at Evansville with 42 goals and 11 assists. In 1997 Evansville inducted Paterson into its Athletic Hall of Fame.

In 1987, Paterson joined the semi-pro San Diego Nomads of the Western Soccer Alliance. He spent the 1989 collegiate off season with the Nomads. However, in 1990, he moved to the Portland Timbers of the American Professional Soccer League which was formed by the merger of the WSA and American Soccer League. He scored eight goals with the Timbers. His four assists that season led the team.
