= Daryl Green =

American soccer player and coach

Personal information
- Full name: Daryl Green
- Date of birth: February 20, 1966 (age 60)
- Place of birth: Seattle, Washington, United States
- Height: 6 ft 0 in (1.83 m)
- Position: Defender

Youth career
- 1984–1988: University of Washington

Senior career*
Years	Team	Apps	(Gls)
1986–1989	F.C. Seattle		
1988–1989	Wichita Wings (indoor)	26	(5)
1989–1990	Kansas City Comets (indoor)		
1990	Portland Timbers		
- * Club domestic league appearances and goals

Daryl Green is an American former professional soccer player. He played four seasons in the Western Soccer Alliance, one in the American Professional Soccer League and two in Major Indoor Soccer League.

== Youth ==
Green was born in Seattle, Washington, and began playing soccer when he was seven. Two years later, his family moved to Montana, where there were no organized teams. When he was eleven, his family returned to Washington, settling in Kent, where he played youth soccer with the Bellevue, Washington Eastside Select and high school soccer at Tahoma Senior High School. He was All State in soccer in 1983 and 1984. Green did not excel only at soccer, but was an excellent high school basketball player, earning All State honors in that sport in 1984. After graduating from high school in 1984, Green attended the University of Washington, where he played as a defender on the men's soccer team from 1984 to 1988 and is tied at sixth place on the school's career assists list with 23.

== Amateur ==
In 1986, Green began playing for a semi-pro team, F.C. Seattle, which played in the Western Soccer Alliance (WSA). While the team had several collegiate players, such as Green, it also had national team and professional, ex-NASL, players. Green continued to play with F.C. Seattle, which changed its name to the Seattle Storm, not to be confused with the current women's basketball team of the same name, through the 1989 season.

== National team ==
In 1988, Green was called into the national team camp as it prepared for the upcoming Summer Olympics. Participated in the Olympics on behalf of the USA, played in England and Ireland.

== Professional ==
That year he was also drafted in the second round of the Major Indoor Soccer League college draft by the Wichita Wings. He played the 1988-1989 MISL season with the Wings, then returned to Seattle for the 1989 outdoor season. The Wings traded Green to the Kansas City Comets with whom he played the 1989–1990 season. In 1990, he did not play for Seattle, but moved to the Portland Timbers of the American Professional Soccer League which had superseded the WSA that year.
