= Dave Bennett (footballer, born 1960) =

English footballer

Personal information
- Full name: David Paul Bennett
- Date of birth: 26 April 1960 (age 66)
- Place of birth: Oldham, England
- Position: Winger

Youth career
- Manchester City

Senior career*
Years	Team	Apps	(Gls)
1978–1984	Norwich City	71	(9)
1982	→ Portland Timbers (loan)	15	(3)
- MVV
- FC Volendam
Total		86	(12)
- * Club domestic league appearances and goals

David Paul Bennett (born 26 April 1960) is an English former professional footballer who played for Manchester City, Norwich City, MVV and FC Volendam, as a winger. In 1982 he made 15 appearances on loan with the Portland Timbers of the North American Soccer League.
