= Tim Bartro =

American soccer player (born 1964)

Personal information
- Date of birth: August 31, 1964 (age 62)
- Place of birth: Honolulu, Hawaii, U.S.
- Height: 5 ft 9 in (1.75 m)
- Positions: Forward; midfielder

Youth career
- 1982: Seattle Sounders

Senior career*
Years	Team	Apps	(Gls)
1983	Seattle Sounders	7	(1)
1983–1984	Golden Bay Earthquakes (indoor)	17	(12)
1984	Golden Bay Earthquakes	2	(0)
1984–1986	Tacoma Stars (indoor)	19	(2)
1986	FC Seattle	?	(1)
1985–1987	San Diego Sockers (indoor)	31	(10)
1987–1988	Memphis Storm (indoor)	17	(5)
1988	Seattle Storm		
1990	Portland Timbers		
1990–1992	Milwaukee Wave (indoor)	47	(38)
1992–1993	Cleveland Crunch (indoor)	33	(11)
1995–1996	Seattle SeaDogs (indoor)	37	(13)
- * Club domestic league appearances and goals

Tim Bartro is an American retired soccer player whose career spanned leagues from the first North American Soccer League to the Continental Indoor Soccer League.

== Playing History ==
In 1982, Bartro graduated from Federal Way High School. That year, the Seattle Sounders selected Bartro in the third round (thirty-third overall) of the North American Soccer League draft. He spent his first season with the Sounders reserves, then made his first team debut in 1983. The Sounders folded after the 1983 season and Bartro moved to the Golden Bay Earthquakes in time to play for them during the NASL indoor season. Although he scored ten goals in seventeen games during the indoor season, Bartro saw time in only two regular seasons, outdoor games in 1984. He left the Earthquakes that fall to sign with the Tacoma Stars of the Major Indoor Soccer League. During the 1985-1986 MISL season, Tacoma sent Bartro to the San Diego Sockers. The Sockers released Bartro at the end of the season, and he returned to Seattle to play for FC Seattle in the Western Soccer Alliance. He was 1986 Second Team All League. In December 1986, Bartro rejoined the Sockers as a free agent, playing for their reserve team until he earned a spot on their roster. In the fall of 1987, Bartro moved to the Memphis Storm of the American Indoor Soccer Association. In 1988, Barto signed with F.C. Seattle, now known as the F.C. Seattle Storm. However, he may have played little or not at all. In 1990, he played for the Portland Timbers in the American Professional Soccer League. That year he also joined the Milwaukee Wave of the AISA. In 1992, the AISA became the National Professional Soccer League and in October the Wave traded Bartro, Bill Andracki and Mark Kerlin to the Cleveland Crunch in exchange for David Vaudreuil. He finished his professional career in 1995 and 1996 with the Seattle SeaDogs of the Continental Indoor Soccer League.

== Coaching ==
Tim Bartro has worked as a soccer coach for over 30 years coaching youth teams, camps, clinics and professionally. Previous coaching experience also includes Washington Premier Football Club and was the 2014 head coach of the Tacoma Galaxy of the Premier Arena Soccer League (PASL.)
