= Portland Timbers (disambiguation) =

Portland Timbers is a Major League Soccer (MLS) expansion team that began playing in 2011.

Portland Timbers may also refer to:

- Portland Timbers 2, the MLS team's top reserve side that plays in Major League Soccer's reserve league MLS Next Pro
- Portland Timbers U23s, a developmental squad for the MLS team that plays in the USL Premier Development League
- Portland Timbers (1975–1982), the original top-flight team that played in the North American Soccer League
- Portland Timbers (1985–1990), the semi-pro team that played in the Western Alliance Challenge Series, Western Soccer Alliance, Western Soccer League and American Professional Soccer League
- Portland Timbers (2001–2010), the second division team that played in the A-League, USL First Division and USSF Division-2 Professional League
