= Jeff Enquist =

American soccer player and coach (born 1968)

Personal information
- Date of birth: May 20, 1968 (age 58)
- Place of birth: Portland, Oregon, U.S.
- Height: 6 ft 2 in (1.88 m)
- Position: Forward

College career
Years	Team	Apps	(Gls)
1986–1987	UNLV Rebels		
1988–1989	Oregon State Beavers		

Senior career*
Years	Team	Apps	(Gls)
1987	F.C. Portland		
1989–1990	Portland Timbers		
1996	Cascade Surge		

Managerial career
- 1993–1999: Pacific Boxers
- 1996: Cascade Surge
- 2004–?: Willamette Bearcats
- * Club domestic league appearances and goals

Jeff Enquist (born May 20, 1968) is an American former soccer forward who played two seasons in the Western Soccer League, one in the American Professional Soccer League and one in the USISL. He has coached extensively at the professional, collegiate and high school levels. He is currently the president of the Portland Youth Soccer Association and the head coach of the Portland City United Soccer Club.

== Player ==
Enquist was an outstanding prep player with Beaverton High School. He was the 1986 Oregon High School of the Year and Parade Magazine High School All-American. He then attended and played soccer at UNLV before transferring to Oregon State University. In 1987, he played the collegiate off season with the semi-professional F.C. Portland of the Western Soccer Alliance. In 1989, he signed with F.C. Portland, now known as the Portland Timbers and played te 1989 and 1990 season with the team. In 1990, the team was part of the American Professional Soccer League. Following the 1990 season, he left professional soccer to devote himself to coaching. He returned for one more season in 1996 with the Cascade Surge of USISL.

== Coaching ==
In 1993, Enquist was hired as the head coach of the Pacific University men's soccer team, a position he held until 1999. In his seven seasons with the Boxers, he led the team to an 81-45-2 record and was named the 1994 and 1996 Northwest Regional Coach of the Year. He is the vice president of the Portland Youth Soccer Association and is both the executive vice president and head coach with the Portland City United Soccer Club. He also coached the Fort Vancouver High School boys' soccer team until he resigned in January 1996 to coach the Cascade Surge. In January 2004, he became the head coach of the Willamette University men's soccer team. He is currently the head coach at PCU (Portland City United Soccer Club). He coached the U13 Girls who recently won the Crossfire Select.
