= Bernie Fagan =

English footballer (1949–2023)

Personal information
- Full name: Bernard Fagan
- Date of birth: 29 January 1949
- Place of birth: Sunderland, England
- Date of death: 30 December 2023 (aged 74)
- Place of death: Portland, Oregon, U.S.
- Position: Defender

Youth career
- 1964–1969: Sunderland

Senior career*
Years	Team	Apps	(Gls)
1969–1970	Northampton Town	6	(0)
1970–1974	Scarborough		
1974–1975	Seattle Sounders	16	(0)
1975–1977	Los Angeles Aztecs	46	(2)
1977	Los Angeles Skyhawks	12	(0)
1978	Colorado Caribous		
1978	Southern California Lazers	20	(0)
1979–1980	Detroit Lightning (indoor)	31	(2)
1980–1982	Portland Timbers	31	(0)
1980–1982	Portland Timbers (indoor)	30	(14)

Managerial career
- 1985–1988: F.C. Portland
- * Club domestic league appearances and goals

Bernard Derek Fagan (29 January 1949 – 30 December 2023) was an English professional footballer who played as a defender. He spent most of his career in the United States where he was later active as a coach.

== Playing career ==
Born on 29 January 1949 in Sunderland, Fagan began his career with the youth team of his hometown club, before making his professional debut in 1969 with Northampton Town. Fagan played non-league football with Scarborough, before moving to the United States in 1974 to sign with the newly created Seattle Sounders of the North American Soccer League. In 1975, he began the season in Seattle but was traded to the Los Angeles Aztecs at mid-season. In 1977, he again began the season with the Aztecs but moved to the Los Angeles Skyhawks of the American Soccer League. In 1978, Fagan again began the season with one team, the Colorado Caribous of the NASL, and ended it with another, the Southern California Lazers of the American Soccer League. In 1979, he moved indoors with the Detroit Lightning of the Major Indoor Soccer League. He then finished his career with the Portland Timbers of the NASL.

== Coaching career ==
After retiring as a player, Fagan became a soccer coach. From 1985 to 1988, he coached F.C. Portland in the Western Soccer Alliance. He was head coach of Warner Pacific College, and he also ran the Bernie Fagan Soccer Camps.

== Death ==
Fagan died on 30 December 2023. According to the announcement, he died in 2023, at the age of 74.
