= Todd Strobeck =

American soccer player

Personal information
- Full name: Todd Strobeck
- Date of birth: August 17, 1966 (age 60)
- Place of birth: Seattle, Washington, United States
- Height: 6 ft 2 in (1.88 m)
- Position: Goalkeeper

College career
| Years | Team | Apps | (Gls) |
| 1984–1987 | Warner Pacific Knights | | |

Senior career*
| Years | Team | Apps | (Gls) |
| 1985–1988 | F.C. Portland | | |
| 1990 | → Portland Timbers | | |
| 1990–1992 | Tacoma Stars (indoor) | 11 | (0) |
| 1993–1995 | F.C. Seattle Storm | | |
| 1996 | Everett BigFoot | | |
- * Club domestic league appearances and goals

Todd Strobeck (born August 17, 1966) is a retired U.S. soccer goalkeeper who four seasons in the Western Soccer Alliance, one in the American Professional Soccer League, one in Major Indoor Soccer League and at least one in USISL.

Strobeck attended Warner Pacific College where he played on the men's soccer team from 1984 to 1987. While still in college, he also played for F.C. Portland, a local semi-pro team in the Western Soccer Alliance during the collegiate off-season. Strobeck played with F.C. Portland from 1985 through 1988. In his last season with the team he was the alliance's All Star goalkeeper.

In 1989, Strobeck sat out the outdoor season as Kasey Keller replaced him as the starting goalkeeper. However, Strobeck returned in 1990 to Portland, now renamed the Timbers. In 1990, he moved north to join the Tacoma Stars of the Major Indoor Soccer League (MISL) for two seasons.

In 1993, he joined the F.C. Seattle Storm in the Pacific Coast Soccer League, playing through the 1995 season with them. He was with the Everett BigFoot of the U.S. Independent Soccer League (USISL) Professional League in 1996.
