= Shawn Medved =

American soccer player and coach

Personal information
- Date of birth: June 16, 1967 (age 59)
- Place of birth: Issaquah, Washington, U.S.
- Height: 5 ft 11 in (1.80 m)
- Position: Forward

College career
Years	Team	Apps	(Gls)
1985–1990	Evergreen State Geoducks		

Senior career*
Years	Team	Apps	(Gls)
1990	Portland Timbers	?	(10)
1990–1992	Tacoma Stars (indoor)	81	(30)
1992–1994	Cleveland Crunch (indoor)	80	(68)
1991–1992	Colorado Foxes	21	(20)
1993	Fort Lauderdale Strikers	16	(0)
1994–1995	Seattle Sounders	?	(7)
1995–1996	Cincinnati Silverbacks (indoor)	40	(61)
1996–1997	D.C. United	32	(4)
1997–1999	San Jose Clash	50	(4)
2000	Bay Area Seals	10	(2)
- * Club domestic league appearances and goals

Shawn Medved is an American retired soccer forward and midfielder. Currently, he coaches youth soccer.

== Youth ==
Medved was born and grew up in Issaquah, Washington. His father, Ron Medved, was a noted American football player for the University of Washington and Philadelphia Eagles. Despite his father's success at football, Shawn chose to pursue a soccer career. He attended Issaquah High School from 1981 to 1985. After graduating from high school Medved attended The Evergreen State College, a small liberal arts college located in Olympia, Washington. The school has a men's soccer which plays in the NAIA. When he finished his career at Evergreen, Medved was the school's all-time scorer, a record since broken by Joey Gjertsen. He was the 1990 NAIA Player of the Year and in 1988 and 1989, Medved was selected as First Team All District. NAIA teams played in districts until 1995, when they moved to a conference structure.

== Professional career ==
After leaving Evergreen, Medved was drafted in the fourth round of the 1990 American Indoor Soccer Association amateur draft by the Atlanta Attack. Medved chose not to pursue a career with the Attack and instead played a single season with the Portland Timbers of the American Professional Soccer League (APSL). Medved led the team in scoring, as a rookie, with ten goals and two assists. This placed him seventh on the league's points list. While Medved had passed on the Atlanta Attack, he decided to sign with the Tacoma Stars of the Major Indoor Soccer League in 1990. After the completion of the APSL season, he joined the Stars, for whom he played two seasons, leaving the team in 1992 for the Cleveland Crunch of the National Professional Soccer League (NPSL). Medved won his second professional championship when the Crunch defeated the St. Louis Ambush to win the 1993–1994 NPSL crown. That year, Medved scored 38 goals and assisted on 19 others for the Crunch.

Medved's first professional championship came with the outdoor Colorado Foxes of the APSL. Medved joined the Foxes halfway through the 1991 season, scoring 5 goals and assisted on 3 others. In 1992, he played the entire season with the Foxes, scoring 15 goals, assisting on 8 others, while the team ran to an 11–5 regular season record and ultimately defeated the Tampa Bay Rowdies in the championship game. The Foxes also defeated the Rowdies in the APSL Professional Cup.

At the end of the 1992 season, Medved moved to the Fort Lauderdale Strikers for the 1993 season. While he was captain of the team, his scoring pace declined dramatically. He played 16 games, scoring no goals, as the Strikers ended the season 9–15. At the end of the 1993 season, Medved moved, this time to the newly re-established Seattle Sounders. Medved remained with the Sounders until drafted by D.C. United in 1996. While Medved did not regain his scoring touch with the Sounders, he did move into the midfield and quickly became a major play maker. In 1994, he led the league with assists. Furthermore, his 11 assists and 1 goal placed him 11th on the APSL points list and led to his selection as a First Team All Star. Despite being in its first year of existence, the Sounders won the APSL regular season, losing to Colorado, Medved's old team, in the post-season semifinals. In 1995, Medved again won a championship ring when the Sounders defeated the Atlanta Ruckus in the APSL championship game. That year, he was part of a potent Sounders strike force consisting of Peter Hattrup and Chance Fry. While Hattrup led the team and league in scoring, Medved, his scoring pace returning, scored 6 goals and 1 assist. That winter saw a return for Medved to the indoor game when he played for the Cincinnati Silverbacks of the NPSL. He finished the 1995–1996 season 5th on the points list, having led his team with 61 goals in 40 games.

On February 6, 1996, D.C. United of the Major League Soccer selected Medved in the second round (20th overall) of the League's Inaugural Draft. That year, Medved played 27 games (starting 13), and scored 3 goals and assisted on one other. However, his greatest moment came in the championship game. D.C. United found themselves down 2–0 to the Los Angeles Galaxy in the first MLS championship game. D.C. coach sent in second-half substitutes Tony Sanneh and Medved. Sanneh scored in the 73rd minute and Medved tied the game in the 82nd minute before Eddie Pope put away the game winner overtime to give D.C. its first championship and Medved his fourth major championship victory. Medved also won the U.S. Open Cup in October 1996 with D.C. United. D.C. United traded Medved to the San Jose Clash during the off season. Medved went on to play two seasons for the Clash, in 1997 and 1998.

In 1998, the Clash waived Medved and on November 2, 1998, the New England Revolution selected him in the 1998 Waiver Draft, but released him on March 10, 1999. No MLS teams selected him. In 2000, he played for the Bay Area Seals in the USL A-League.

== Post retirement career ==
After his retirement, Medved and his family settled in the San Francisco Bay area and founded the Williams Aquatic Center; he coaches youth soccer and plays for Portola VSC of the semi-pro San Francisco Soccer Football League's (SFSFL) Premier Division (YSP). He also works for the Westside Mortgage Group.
