= Peter Hattrup =

American soccer player and coach

Personal information
- Date of birth: March 31, 1964 (age 62)
- Place of birth: Seattle, Washington, United States
- Height: 5 ft 11 in (1.80 m)
- Positions: Forward; midfielder

College career
Years	Team	Apps	(Gls)
1982–1985	Seattle Pacific Falcons		(51)

Senior career*
Years	Team	Apps	(Gls)
1984–1986	F.C. Seattle		
1986–1988	Tacoma Stars (indoor)	15	(2)
1988–1989	Seattle Storm		
1990	Portland Timbers		
1989–1991	Atlanta Attack (indoor)	67	(76)
1991–1994	Kansas City Attack (indoor)	99	(70)
1993	San Jose Hawks		
1994–1995	Seattle Sounders	27	(11)
1996	Tampa Bay Mutiny	0	(0)
1997	Dallas Burn	7	(0)
1997–1999	Seattle Sounders	56	(12)
1997–2001	Milwaukee Wave (indoor)	124	(91)
2001	Seattle Sounders	11	(2)

International career
1988	US Futsal	3	(0)

Managerial career
- Seattle Sounders Women (assistant)
- * Club domestic league appearances and goals

Peter Hattrup (born March 31, 1964) is an American former professional soccer player who played professionally in Major League Soccer and the USL A-League.

== Player ==
=== Youth ===
Hattrup was a four-year starter as a star player for the Seattle Preparatory School boys' soccer team. He graduated in 1982 and entered Seattle Pacific University. Hattrup was a scoring sensation for Seattle Pacific men's NCAA Division II soccer team. In 1985, he set the school record for goals scored in a single season with 26. He was more than a one-dimensional forward; his 16 assists that year ranks third on the school's list of single-season assists. That record lasted until Jason Dunn broke it in 1985. He is third on the school's career goals list, with 59 goals over three years, 1982, 1983 and 1985. He finished tied for fifth on the school's career assists list, with 31 over three years. He was selected a three-time All-Region (NSCAA), two-time All Conference (Northwest Collegiate Soccer Conference), and was selected as a two-time team MVP. Hattrup did not merely garner multiple individual honors, but was an integral part of two Division II championship teams, in 1983 and 1985. In the 1985 championship victory over FIU, Hattrup scored a goal and assisted another, earning MVP honors. He ended the 1985 tournament as the leading scorer with 5 goals and 1 assist.

=== Professional ===
Hattrup spent three years with F.C. Seattle, two while in college. In 1984, F.C. Seattle was born out of the collapse of the North American Soccer League. It was a collection of ex-NASL players, local amateurs and college players, such as Hattrup, who were looking for more than local rec league soccer. While F.C. Seattle played games against professional clubs, its independent nature allowed Hattrup to retain his amateur NCAA eligibility. After finishing his time with Seattle Pacific, Hattrup began a professional career which would take him through numerous leagues and almost a dozen teams. First, he became a full professional with F.C. Seattle, now renamed the Seattle Storm, for the 1986 Western Soccer Alliance season. In 1988, he scored 6 goals and added an assist, leading to his selection for the league's All Star team. He also won his first professional championship that year when Seattle defeated the San Jose Earthquakes 5–0 in Seattle's Memorial Stadium to take the WSA title. In 1989 the Storm finished out of playoff contention, and at the end of the season Hattrup moved to the Portland Timbers of the newly created American Professional Soccer League for the 1990 season.

In 1986, the Tacoma Stars of the Major Indoor Soccer League selected Hattrup as the top draft pick. He joined the Stars at the completion of the WSA season and would go on to play two seasons with the Stars. The 1986-1987 was an excellent season for the Stars. They won the MISL Western Division, but lost to the Dallas Sidekicks 4 games to 3 in the championship series.

While Hattrup left the Tacoma Stars at the end of the 1987–1988 season, he continued playing indoor soccer with the newly established Atlanta Attack of the American Indoor Soccer Association for the team's 1989–1990 season. Despite being a new franchise, the Attack made it to the AISA semifinals, before falling to the Dayton Dynamo 2 games to 1. Hattrup made the AISA All Star Team, having ended the season third on the point list. The next year, the Attack joined the National Professional Soccer League and again lost to the Dynamo, this time in the first round of the playoffs. At the end of the 1990–1991 season, the Attack moved from Atlanta to Kansas City, where Hattrup played two more seasons with the team, 1991–1992 and 1992–1993. In the 1991–1992 season, Hattrup returned to the league's points list, finishing 11th. However, the Attack again fell in the semifinals, this time to the Canton Invaders. In Hattrup's last year with the team, they finally found success and defeated the Cleveland Crunch to take the NPSL title. In all, Hattrup was a four-time NPSL All Star during his tenure with the Attack. During his time with the Attack, both in Atlanta and Kansas City, Hattrup played for Keith Tozer, whom he would later team up with when Hattrup joined the Milwaukee Wave in 1987.

In 1994, Hattrup joined the newly re-established Seattle Sounders. While the Sounders won the regular season, they fell to the Colorado Foxes in the playoff semifinals. In 1995, Hattrup won yet another championship when he led the United Soccer Leagues First Division in goals (11), assists (8) and points (30) while taking the Sounders to a victory over the Atlanta Ruckus in the championship series. His play led to his selection to the All Star team and being named the league MVP.

His high scoring ways brought him to the attention of the Tampa Bay Mutiny, which drafted Hattrup in the second round (17th overall) of the 1996 MLS Inaugural Player Draft. It appeared that Hattrup had finally made the big time, as a teammate of Carlos Valderrama and Roy Lassiter. However, he experienced a season-ending injury when he tore his medial collateral ligament (MCL) and anterior cruciate ligament (ACL) in an optional pre-season practice session. The Mutiny traded him to the Dallas Burn where Burn coach Dave Dir moved Hattrup to the wide midfield. As Hattrup noted, "The strange thing is he told me he wanted me to come and score goals. In the middle of midfield that's fine. But in the 3-5-2, to be honest, I don't have the engine. I'm not going to be able to go to the penalty box for the whole game."

Hattrup was waived by the Burn after seven games in the 1997 season. He moved to Seattle where he joined the Sounders for the remainder of the season. He stayed with the Sounders through the end of the 1999 season. He not only played but also served as an assistant coach in 1998 and 1999. He would return for a last season with the Sounders as a player/assistant coach in 2001. At the end of that season, he retired from playing professionally.

Between those last two stints with the Sounders, Hattrup rejoined Keith Tozer, now head coach of the Milwaukee Wave of the National Professional Soccer League. Hattrup played three and a half seasons with the Wave, during which time he won two championships. On December 8, 2000, the Wave announced they had released Hattrup after a dismal 2–7 start.

=== International ===
Hattrup also earned three caps with the United States national futsal team in 1988.

== Coaching ==
Since his retirement from playing professional soccer, Hattrup has entered the coaching ranks. He is an assistant coach of the Seattle Sounders Women, which play in the United Soccer League W-League. He also coaches in the LWYSA Crossfire Premier Soccer club. In 2006, he took his U14 girls team, Washington Crossfire, to the Super Y-League North American championship at the Ed Rice Complex in Tampa, Florida. In 2002, his U17 boys team won the Sun Bowl Championship. He just let go of his GU14s, now GU15, after being coach of that team for 4 years. They were the first team that he had taken from U-11. He is now taking up a BU11 developmental team with Bernie James. Other than that team, he will be coaching the GU16 "A" and BU16 "B".
