= Wade Webber =

American soccer player and coach

Personal information
- Full name: Wade Webber
- Date of birth: January 12, 1967 (age 59)
- Place of birth: Renton, Washington, United States
- Height: 6 ft 3 in (1.91 m)
- Position: Defender

Team information
- Current team: Seattle Sounders FC

College career
Years	Team	Apps	(Gls)
1985–1988	Portland Pilots		

Senior career*
Years	Team	Apps	(Gls)
1986–1987	F.C. Portland		
1989	Portland Timbers		
1990	Seattle Storm		
1994–1996	Seattle Sounders		
1997	Dallas Burn	18	(2)
1997	→ New Orleans Riverboat Gamblers (loan)	2	(1)
1998–1999	Miami Fusion	35	(0)

Managerial career
- 2018–2020: Tacoma Defiance (assistant)
- 2021–2023: Tacoma Defiance
- * Club domestic league appearances and goals

Wade Webber (born January 12, 1967) is an American soccer coach and former player who spent most of his career with clubs in the Pacific Northwest. However, he did see three years in Major League Soccer with the Dallas Burn and Miami Fusion before suffering a career ending knee injury. He is currently head coach of MLS Next Pro club Tacoma Defiance.

== Youth and college ==
Webber grew up in the Seattle area, attending Thomas Jefferson High School from 1983 to 1985. In his three years at Jefferson High, Webber was a key part of three consecutive state high school soccer championships. After graduating from high school, Webber attended the University of Portland where he played on the men's soccer from 1985 to 1988. His senior year the Pilots went to the NCAA Final Four only to fall to eventual champion Indiana.

== Western Soccer League ==
While still in college, Webber played with F.C. Portland of the Western Soccer Alliance during the collegiate off season. He spent both the 1986 and 1987 season with Portland.

In 1989, he returned to the professional circuit, this time with the Portland Timbers of the renamed Western Soccer League. While Webber spent three years playing in Portland with F.C. Portland and the Portland Timbers, after completing his collegiate eligibility, he returned to the Seattle area to sign with the Seattle Storm for the 1990 season. This year both the Storm and the Timbers competed in the newly created American Professional Soccer League (APSL) which had been formed by the merger of the west coast Western Soccer League and the east coast American Soccer League. The Storm finished with a record of 10-10 and folded at the end of the season. Webber was a second team APSL All Star.

Following the demise of the Storm, Webber briefly left professional soccer as he took a teaching job. In 1993, Webber earned a master's degree in teaching from Seattle University. At the time he was also teaching history and coaching the boys soccer team at Sedro-Woolley High School.

In 1994, he returned to soccer with the Seattle Sounders of the American Professional Soccer League (APSL). This was the first year of the resurrected Sounders and it featured many names from the old North American Soccer League Sounders. Despite being a first year team, the 1994 Sounders went to the APSL semifinals. During the season, Webber was also a history teacher at Sedro-Woolley High School. Then in 1995 and 1996, the Sounders took the title. In 1994, Webber played 17 games, scoring two goals. In 1995, he saw time in 23 games, scoring one goal.

== MLS ==
In 1997, the Dallas Burn selected Webber in the first round (second pick overall) of the Supplemental Draft. That season, he saw time in twenty-two games, scoring two goals. At the end of the season the Burn did not protect Webber in the Expansion Draft and he was selected by the Miami Fusion. Webber went on to play two seasons with the Fusion, but on May 15, 1999, he suffered a career ending knee injury.

== Post-playing career ==
Since retiring from playing professional soccer, Webber spent ten years teaching IB History of the Americas and coaching girls soccer at his alma mater Thomas Jefferson High School. Wade Webber Coached Lamar Neagle and the Norpoint Soccer Club Chivas Team, prior to Lamar Neagle signing with the Seattle Sounders. He previously coached at Washington Premier Football Club. After spending three seasons with the team as an assistant, Webber was named head coach of the Tacoma Defiance. Ahead of the 2024 season, Webber was promoted to Director of Development for the Seattle Sounders FC Academy system.
