= Mark Miller (soccer) =

American soccer player

Personal information
- Full name: Mark Miller
- Date of birth: June 12, 1962 (age 64)
- Place of birth: Tacoma, Washington, U.S.
- Height: 6 ft 0 in (1.83 m)
- Position: Forward

Youth career
- 1981–1984: University of Portland

Senior career*
Years	Team	Apps	(Gls)
1985–1986	F.C. Portland		(7)
1989–1990	Portland Timbers		
- * Club domestic league appearances and goals

Mark Miller (born June 12, 1962) is an American retired soccer forward. A native of Tacoma, Washington, Miller attended the University of Portland where he played on the men's soccer team under coach Clive Charles. Miller was on the team from 1981 to 1984. In 1985 and 1986, he played with F.C. Portland of the Western Soccer Alliance. In 1986, he was the league's second leading scorer with 19 points on 7 goals and 5 assists. Teammate Brent Goulet won the points title that year with 20 points on 9 goals and 2 assists. While F.C. Portland ran to the second best record on Goulet and Miller's scoring, the WSA named a champion based on regular season record only. The Hollywood Kickers therefore took the alliance title.

Miller later played with the Portland Timbers in 1989 and 1990.

As of 2007 he coaches with the F.C. Portland youth club.
