= Scott Benedetti =

American soccer player

Personal information
- Date of birth: November 13, 1966 (age 59)
- Place of birth: Portland, Oregon, United States
- Height: 5 ft 11 in (1.80 m)
- Positions: Forward; midfielder

College career
Years	Team	Apps	(Gls)
1985–1989	Portland Pilots		

Senior career*
Years	Team	Apps	(Gls)
1986–1989	Portland Timbers		
1989–1990	Tacoma Stars (indoor)	8	(1)
1990	Seattle Storm		
1991	Colorado Foxes	17	(5)
1992	Miami Freedom	7	(3)
1992	UNAM Pumas	3	(0)
1993–1994	Colorado Foxes	?	(11)
1996–1997	Colorado Rapids	35	(3)
2001–2005	Portland Timbers	96	(6)

International career
1996	United States	1	(0)
- * Club domestic league appearances and goals

Scott "Benny" Benedetti (born November 13, 1966, in Portland, Oregon) is an American retired soccer player. He began his professional career with the semi-professional F.C. Portland in 1986 and ended it with the U.S. second division club Portland Timbers in 2005. While he spent most of his career in the U.S. divisions, he had just over a season in Major League Soccer and half a season in the Primera División de México with UNAM Pumas. He earned one cap with the U.S. national team in 1996. He played in such places as South Korea, Thailand, England, Austria and Scotland.

== High school and college ==
Benedetti attended Centennial High School in Gresham, Oregon. Benedetti attended the University of Portland where he played men's soccer for Clive Charles from 1985 to 1989. In 1988, he was named a First-Team All-American as the Pilots went to the NCAA Final Four before falling to eventual champions Indiana. In 1994, Benedetti was inducted into the University of Portland Hall of Fame.

== Professional ==
While still in college, Benedetti played for F.C. Portland of the Western Soccer Alliance (WSA) during the collegiate off-season. The semi-pro nature of the league allowed him to retain his NCAA eligibility. In 1988, Benedetti led the WSA in scoring with eight goals while the team finished at the bottom of the standings. This led to his selection to the All-Star team, an honor he received each season until 1991. In 1989, he scored eight goals and added an assist for F.C. Portland team which finished second in the North Division. Portland lost to the eventual WSL champion San Diego Nomads in the post-season semi-finals. After graduating from college, Benedetti played a single season with the Tacoma Stars of the Major Indoor Soccer League. After four seasons with Portland, Benedetti signed with the Seattle Storm in February 1990. In 1991, he moved again to the Colorado Foxes. In 1992, Benedetti played half a season for the Miami Freedom and a season with the UNAM Pumas. In 1993, Benedetti returned to the Colorado Foxes. That year the Foxes defeated the Los Angeles Heat for the APSL championship in a shootout after the game ended tied after overtimes. Benedetti would play for the Foxes again in 1994, but after that, his career has a blank spot for which there are no records. In 1996, the Colorado Rapids drafted Benedetti in the eighth round (seventy-second overall) of the Inaugural MLS draft. Benedetti started thirty-two games during the 1996 season. In 2001, Benedetti signed with the Portland Timbers of the USL First Division. He played five seasons with the Timbers, retiring after the 2005 season.

== National team ==
On October 16, 1996, Benedetti earned his single cap with the national team in a 4–1 loss to Peru. The national team had gone on strike over a disagreement with the United States Soccer Federation (USSF) and the federation was forced to field a team of fringe and non-national team players for this game.

== Post-playing career ==
Since retiring from playing, Benedetti has entered the ranks of the youth soccer coaches with the Lake Oswego Youth Soccer Club. He currently owns a real estate investment business and an award-winning home building company, Axiom Luxury Homes.
