= Clive Charles =

English footballer and manager (1951–2003)

- Charles in 1968

Personal information
- Full name: Clive Michael Charles
- Date of birth: 3 October 1951
- Place of birth: Bow, London, England
- Date of death: 26 August 2003 (aged 51)
- Place of death: Portland, Oregon, U.S.
- Height: 6 ft 1 in (1.85 m)
- Position: Defender

Senior career*
Years	Team	Apps	(Gls)
1970–1973	West Ham United	14	(0)
1971–1972	→ Montreal Olympique (loan)	28	(0)
1974–1977	Cardiff City	77	(5)
1978–1981	Portland Timbers	67	(0)
1980–1981	Portland Timbers (indoor)	9	(7)
1981–1982	Pittsburgh Spirit (indoor)	26	(10)
1982–1983	Los Angeles Lazers (indoor)	33	(5)
Total		254	(27)

Managerial career
- 1982–1985: Reynolds Raiders
- 1986–2003: Portland Pilots
- 1989–2003: Portland Pilots (women)
- 1993–1995: United States U20 (women)
- 1996–2000: United States U23
- 1995–1998: United States (assistant)
- * Club domestic league appearances and goals

Clive Michael Charles (3 October 1951 – 26 August 2003) was an English football player, coach and television announcer. He was one of five National Collegiate Athletic Association (NCAA) coaches to win more than 400 games.

Charles was born in Bow and raised in Canning Town. Charles's father was a seaman from Grenada and his mother a white woman from Silvertown. Charles began his career with West Ham United, where his brother John Charles played. In 1978, he began playing professionally in the United States with the NASL Portland Timbers. He spent the last years of his playing career in the Major Indoor Soccer League, first with the Pittsburgh Spirits, then with the Los Angeles Lazers.

Charles spent his later life in the United States, coaching at the high school, collegiate and international levels in the Portland, Oregon, area, primarily at Reynolds High School and the University of Portland. In 2002, he coached the University of Portland's women's soccer team to the national championship. He also coached the US Men's National Team to the semifinals of the 2000 Summer Olympics, the farthest the US men had gone since 1904. In 2001, he was diagnosed with prostate cancer, of which he died in 2003.

== Early life ==
Clive Michael Charles was born on 3 October 1951 in Bow, East London, England. Raised in nearby Canning Town, he was the youngest of nine children. His father was a merchant seaman originally from Grenada and his mother a white woman from Silvertown. He grew up in a working-class neighbourhood playing street football.

== Playing career ==
When he was 12 years old, Charles began playing with the West Ham United youth teams and signed with the club as an apprentice when he turned 15. He would sign with West Ham as a full professional when he turned 17 and joined the first team in 1970 as a defender. However, West Ham was stocked with talent and Charles had difficulty finding playing time. In 1971 and 1972, he played two seasons on loan from West Ham with the Montreal Olympique of the now defunct North American Soccer League (NASL). While with Montreal, he met his future wife Clarena, then a flight attendant flying between Montreal and England. He was also honoured as a second team NASL All Star in both of his seasons in Montreal. When playing time continued to elude Charles, West Ham loaned him to Second Division side Cardiff City for the last 8 games of the 1974 season. Even though Cardiff City were relegated to the Third Division, Charles chose to sign with the team and became its captain at the age of 23. Cardiff won promotion back to the Second Division in 1976. Charles finished his career with Cardiff City in 1978, playing over 100 games and scoring 5 goals.

In 1978, the NASL Portland Timbers bought Charles' contract from Cardiff City. He remained with the Timbers through the 1981 outdoor season. However, injuries began to hamper Charles and in 1981, he played only 4 games with the Timbers and did not return to the team the next year. In addition to playing for the Timbers' outdoor team, Charles had played 9 games for the Timbers during the 1980–81 NASL indoor season. His jersey, number 3, was retired by the Timbers after his death in 2003. He was honoured by the Timbers during a game against the Seattle Sounders FC on 24 June 2012 by a large tifo held up by the Timbers Army prior to the start of the game.

At the end of the 1981 NASL season, Charles moved to the indoor Pittsburgh Spirit and then the Los Angeles Lazers, both of the Major Indoor Soccer League. He later admitted that "I hated it. But it paid the bills." In 1982, he was playing with the Lazers when Jimmy Conway, a former Timbers teammate, called Charles and told him of an opening at the Reynolds High School boys' team in Troutdale, Oregon. He immediately retired from playing and moved his family back to Oregon.

== Coaching career ==
Charles began his coaching as a young player in England, but he had no idea then the success coaching would bring to him. Charles remained with Reynolds High School for three years before the University of Portland hired Charles as its men's coach in 1986. In 1989, the university expanded his duties to include both the men's and women's teams. He would continue coaching the UP teams until his death. In his last season (2002), the UP women's team won the National Collegiate Athletic Association (NCAA) championship. During his tenure as the men's coach, Charles had a hand in beginning the career of numerous outstanding future players, including American men's internationals Kasey Keller, Steve Cherundolo, and Conor Casey, American women's internationals Tiffeny Milbrett and Shannon MacMillan, and Canadian international Christine Sinclair. Other players include Yari Allnutt, Scott Benedetti, Kelly Gray, Nate Jaqua and Wade Webber.

In 1986, Charles founded FC Portland, a local youth soccer club. The club fields numerous youth teams in local, state and national competitions.

Charles also spent several years as coach of the United States men's under-23 national team, culminating with the 2000 Summer Olympics. During this period, Charles was battling prostate cancer, but continued to coach the US and achieved a fourth-place finish in the games, their best finish at the Olympics in almost a century. He retired from coaching the U23 team after the Olympics with a record of 23–11–13 (.628). He also coached the team to a bronze medal at the 1999 Pan American Games and third place at the 1997 World University Games. He also served as an assistant coach of the United States men's senior national team in the 1998 World Cup.

In 1994, he worked as an announcer for ESPN during the 1994 FIFA World Cup.

== Death ==
Charles was first diagnosed with prostate cancer in 2000, and underwent weekly chemotherapy treatments to treat the disease. He ultimately died of the cancer on 26 August 2003 in Portland. He was inducted into the Oregon Sports Hall of Fame that same year. He is interred at Mount Calvary Cemetery in Portland.

== See also ==
- Merlo Field
