= Brent Goulet =

American soccer player

Personal information
- Full name: Brent Goulet
- Date of birth: June 19, 1964 (age 62)
- Place of birth: Cavalier, North Dakota, U.S.
- Height: 6 ft 0 in (1.83 m)
- Position: Forward

College career
Years	Team	Apps	(Gls)
1983–1987	Warner Pacific Knights		

Senior career*
Years	Team	Apps	(Gls)
1986–1987	FC Portland		(9)
1987	FC Seattle	5	(2)
1987–1988	AFC Bournemouth	6	(0)
1988	→ Crewe Alexandra (loan)	3	(3)
1989–1990	Seattle Storm	6	(6)
1989–1990	Tacoma Stars (indoor)	33	(11)
1990–1992	Bonner SC		
1992–1994	Tennis Borussia Berlin	43	(21)
1994–1995	Bonner SC		
1995–1996	Rot-Weiß Oberhausen		
1996–1998	Wuppertaler SV		
1998–2001	SV Elversberg	10	(0)

International career
1986–1990	United States	8	(1)

Managerial career
- 2004–2008: SV Elversberg
- * Club domestic league appearances and goals

Brent Goulet (born June 19, 1964) is an American retired soccer forward who later coached SV Elversberg from 2004 to 2008. He began his career in the United States before moving to England and Germany, and also earned eight caps with the U.S. national team. He was the 1987 U.S. Soccer Athlete of the Year (Most prestigious award in U.S. Soccer) and was a member of the United States Olympic Soccer team at the (1988 Summer Olympics in Seoul, South Korea). Member of 1989 U.S. Futsal World Championship Bronze Medal-winning team in Holland. 2018 Walt Chysowych Distinguished Playing Career Award recipient.

== Early career ==
Goulet was born in Cavalier, North Dakota, but grew up in Tacoma, Washington. After graduating from Henry Foss High School in 1983, he attended Warner Pacific College in Portland, Oregon, which played in the NAIA, and was coached by Bernie Fagan, who had extensive professional experience at Sunderland A.F.C. and the Portland Timbers. Under Fagan's direction, Goulet (4-year All-American) became the dominant offensive player on the team, scoring a collegiate record setting 108 goals over four seasons and being a finalist for the 1987 Hermann Award going to the best men's collegiate soccer player in the country (Bruce Murray of Clemson). In 1984, Warner Pacific took third in the NAIA National Championship tournament where Goulet was selected to All Tournament Team (also selected to 1985 All Tournament Team).

== WSL ==
In the 1986 offseason, Goulet played for F.C. Portland of the Western Soccer Alliance. Despite playing as an amateur in a professional league, Goulet led the league in scoring with nine goals and two assists. He played one more season with F.C. Portland in 1987, and was honored as the league MVP. The WSA season ran to the end of May. At the end of the season, Goulet joined Portland's rival F.C. Seattle for a five-game tour of Britain. That tour, which ran from July 27 to August 6, included a game with English Second Division club AFC Bournemouth. Goulet's excellent play on the tour, which included two goals, led to Celtic Glasgow, Queens Park Rangers, and Bournemouth contract offers. Goulet signed with Bournemouth with Harry Redknapp as manager who had previously managed with the Seattle Sounders of the NASL (North American Soccer League).

== United States national team ==
Goulet's prolific scoring ability also brought him to the attention of the United States men's national soccer team and, in 1986, he earned his first cap in a February 5, 1986 0–0 tie with Canada. He played again two days later in a 1–1 tie with Uruguay. These were the only two national team games that year.

In 1987, the U.S. began qualification for the 1988 Summer Olympics in Seoul, South Korea. Goulet became a regular with the U.S. Olympic team, scoring six goals in six games. While the full national team played these matches, since they are part of Olympic soccer, FIFA did not recognize them as full internationals. Goulet was recognized by the USSF as its 1987 U.S. Soccer Athlete of the Year.

In 1988, he continued his excellent play with the Olympic team, scoring a goal in the U.S. team's 4–2 loss to the Soviet Union at the Summer Olympics. In 1988, despite playing for the national team at the Olympics, he only played one international match, a May 14 loss to Colombia. Goulet began 1989 by playing three consecutive national team games, but did not play again until February 1990, when he played his last two games with the team.

Goulet also earned 12 caps between 1987 and 1989 as part of the U.S. Futsal team which captured the 1989 Bronze Medal in the World Championships in the Netherlands. For their efforts, they were honored with the Walt Chysowych Distinguished Playing Career Award for being the first U.S. Team (Men or Women) in U.S. Soccer history to capture a medal in FIFA competition.

== England and return to the WSL ==
Goulet played six games with Bournemouth during the 1987–1988 season. He was loaned out to Crewe Alexandra F.C., for which he again showed his scoring prowess scoring three goals in three games, assisting another, and forcing an own goal. He was asked to stay on another month, but was called back to Bournemouth who were in a relegation battle trying to stay in the 2nd division.

From England, after the 1988 Olympics, Goulet signed a contract with the United States National Team helping the U.S. qualify for the 1990 World Cup in Italy. He also played with the Seattle Storm of the WSA in 1989 and 1990. In 1989, he began with a bang, scoring two hat-tricks before suffering an ankle injury on June 9. He returned at the end of the season and finished that year with six goals in six games. In October 1990, he signed with the Tacoma Stars of the Major Indoor Soccer League, playing a single season before moving permanently to Europe.

== Move to Germany ==
Goulet elected to move to Germany where he previously had an offer in 1987 from Bayer Uerdingen of the Bundesliga before choosing to play in England for Bournemouth instead because of foreign player rules making it difficult at that time. He began with Bonner SC, an Oberliga club, playing two seasons, with 31 goals in 1991–92. His prolific scoring led to a move to Tennis Borussia Berlin on a free transfer with other offers from the 1st (1F.C. Koln) and 2nd Bundesliga (Fortuna Düsseldorf). In his first season with the team, he scored 21 goals, helping the club win promotion to the 2nd Bundesliga. The team struggled, fighting relegation and had three different managers during the first half of the season. Goulet decided to transfer back to Bonner SC with whom he played through 1994–95 before a free transfer to

Rot-Weiß Oberhausen during the 1995–1996 season. He moved on to Wuppertaler SV on a free transfer for the 96–98 seasons before moving to his last club in Germany, S.V. 07 Elversberg, where he would end his playing career through a broken leg during the 2000–2001 season at the age of 37.

== Coaching in Germany ==
In 2001 Goulet decided to retire from playing and enter a coaching career because of his career ending injury. He became an assistant coach at Elversberg and in 2004 was promoted to head coach becoming the first American-born head coach at this level in German soccer history. In March 2008, the club released Goulet.

He went on to acquire the German Fußballlehrer License (UEFA-Pro), which is the highest coaching certification world-wide.
