= Sacramento Senators (soccer) =

The Sacramento Senators are a defunct U.S. soccer team which spent a single season in the Western Soccer League in 1989. The Senators played in Sacramento, California. Carlos Azevedo, a defender, was later entered into the Sacramento Hall of Fame in 1989.

== Year-by-year ==
Year	Division	League	Reg. season	Playoffs	Open Cup
1989	N/A	WSL	4th, North	Did not qualify	Did not enter
