= John Bain (footballer, born 1957) =

Scottish footballer (born 1957)

Personal information
- Full name: John Bain
- Date of birth: 23 June 1957 (age 69)
- Place of birth: Falkirk, Scotland
- Position: Midfielder

Senior career*
Years	Team	Apps	(Gls)
1974–1978	Bristol City	6	(0)
1976–1977	→ Brentford (loan)	18	(1)
1978–1982	Portland Timbers	148	(45)
1980–1982	Portland Timbers (indoor)	33	(28)
1983	Seattle Sounders	24	(2)
1983–1984	Golden Bay Earthquakes (indoor)	29	(12)
1984	Minnesota Strikers	22	(4)
1984–1985	Minnesota Strikers (indoor)	48	(12)
1985–1987	Kansas City Comets (indoor)	66	(33)
1987–1988	St. Louis Steamers (indoor)	79	(33)
1988	Ottawa Intrepid	10	(0)
1988–1989	Tacoma Stars (indoor)	33	(4)
1989–1990	Portland Timbers		(3)
1993–1994	Portland Pride (indoor)	26	(17)

Managerial career
- 1989–1990: Portland Timbers (player-manager)
- 1991–1992: Mountain View High School
- 1993–1996: Portland Pride (player-manager)
- 1991, 1995–????: Westside Metro
- * Club domestic league appearances and goals

John Bain (born 3 June 1957) is a Scottish retired soccer midfielder who currently coaches youth soccer in the United States. Bain began his professional career in England before moving to the United States in 1978. Over his twenty-year playing career, Bain played for numerous leagues and teams, both indoors and out. After retiring from playing professionally, he has coached at the professional, youth club and high school levels in the US.

== Player ==
Although born in Scotland, Bain's father was a scout for the English club Bristol City. Bain signed with Bristol City in July 1974, but was unable to break into the first team. In 1976, Bristol loaned him to Brentford for the 1976/77 season. In 1978, Bristol transferred two players, defender Brian McNeill and John Bain to the Portland Timbers of the North American Soccer League. Before moving to the United States and joining the Timbers, Bain played on Scotland's U-18 and U-21 teams. He would never return to play in Britain or for the Scottish national teams. During five seasons with the Timbers, Bain became one of the team's all-time greatest players. He would go on to score 45 goals and assist on 55 others giving him the Timbers' record for career goals and assists. Additionally, he is in second place on the list of games played with 148. In addition to his outdoor success, Bain played in both the 1980–1981 and 1981–1982 NASL indoor seasons. In the 1980–1981 season, he scored 20 goals in 15 games. In the 1981–1982 NASL indoor season, his scoring pace dropped as he only bagged 8 goals in 18 games. The Timbers folded at the end of the 1982 outdoor season and the Seattle Sounders picked up Bain in the dispersal draft. He would play a single season with the Sounders, before they also folded. In 1984, he played with the Minnesota Strikers in the NASL's last season. When the NASL collapsed in 1984, the Strikers moved to the Major Indoor Soccer League (MISL). Bain played one season indoors with the Strikers, then moved to the Kansas City Comets, also of the MISL, for the next two seasons. In 1988, he played for the Ottawa Intrepid. In 1989, Bain returned to Portland as a player/coach for the new Portland Timbers of the Western Soccer League (WSL). This team had begun existence as F.C. Portland, but had reclaimed the name and heritage of the NASL Timbers for the 1989 season. Bain was selected to the league's first team All Star list that year. In 1990, the WSL merged with the American Soccer League to form the American Professional Soccer League (APSL). Bain remained with the team as a player/coach. At the end of the season, the Timbers owner, Art Dixon, folded the team after losing $500,000 over two years.

== Coach ==
=== High school ===
Bain left playing and began full-time coaching. In 1991 and 1992, Bain led the Mountain View High School men's soccer team to back-to-back Washington State Championship Titles. In addition, Bain's Mountain View High School soccer team was recognised by USA Today as being the 6th best boys' soccer team in the nation.

=== Portland Pride ===
In 1993, Bain returned to Portland to become the first coach / player of the Portland Pride of the Continental Indoor Soccer League. He coached the team until 1996.

=== Youth coach ===
Beginning in 1995, Bain has coached various youth teams of the Westside Metros (also known as Westside Timbers) in Beaverton, Oregon. He also coached with the club in 1991 before moving to Washington State.

He married his wife Darcy when with the NASL Timbers. His son Brendon played for Las Vegas Strikers of the National Premier Soccer League. He is currently married to Shannon Bain. They have three boys; Camelon, McEwan, and Stirling.
