= Warner Pacific University =

Christian university in Portland, Oregon, US

- Former names: Pacific Bible College (1937–1959); Warner Pacific College (1959–2018)
- Type: Private college
- Established: 1937; 89 years ago
- Religious affiliation: Church of God (Anderson, Indiana)
- Endowment: $22 million (2025)
- President: Christina M. Schnyders
- Students: 410
- Undergraduates: 406
- Postgraduates: 4
- Location: Portland, Oregon, U.S. 45.506°N 122.593°W
- Campus: Urban
- Colors: Warner Pacific Blue & Mt. Tabor Green
- Sporting affiliations: NAIA – CCC
- Website: warnerpacific.edu
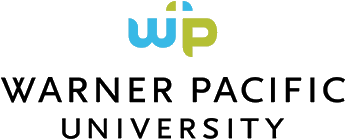

Warner Pacific University is a private Christian college in Portland, Oregon, United States. It was founded in 1937 and is accredited by the Northwest Commission on Colleges and Universities and affiliated with the Church of God. The institution's colors, both Warner Pacific Blue and Mt. Tabor Green, represent the natural beauty of the surrounding Portland environment, specifically the water and evergreen landscape.

== History ==
The school was established by the Church of God, whose founder was Daniel Sidney Warner. The church voted to establish the college in September 1935, and in January 1936 the church bought land in Spokane, Washington, for the school. It was then incorporated on February 9, 1937, as "Pacific Bible College" with classes starting in October 1937.

Then Pacific Bible College moved to Oregon in 1940 to its current campus in the Mount Tabor neighborhood of Southeast Portland. In 1959, it was renamed as "Warner Pacific College," and in 1961 received full accreditation by the Northwest Commission on Colleges and Universities. The institution long sought to expand its campus, most recently (in 2006) pursuing the purchase of a nine-acre portion of city property adjoining the park. In its negotiations, the institution was represented by attorney and former Parks commissioner Jim Francesconi, but that deal fell through when the neighborhood association got wind of negotiations and felt that the sale of the public land was improper.

The college was ranked as the sixth best among western regional colleges by U.S. News & World Report in 2016. In 2018, the school changed its name to Warner Pacific University, and (with 30.1% of its student body identifying as Latino or Hispanic) it became the first four-year college or university in Oregon to be designated a Hispanic-Serving Institution by the U.S. Department of Education.

== Academics ==
Warner Pacific University's traditional undergraduate program offers 23 baccalaureate degree programs, 7 areas of pre-professional study, 23 minors, and 6 associate degree programs. For working adults, Warner Pacific University offers its Professional and Graduate Studies program with 8 baccalaureate degree programs, 6 minors, and 4 associate degree program. Additionally, 4 graduate-level programs are offered: Master of Business Administration (MBA), Master of Arts in Organizational Leadership (MAOL), Master of Education (MEd), and Master of Arts in Teaching (MAT).

== Campus ==
Warner Pacific is situated on a 15-acre (0.061 km^{2}) urban campus on the southern slope of Mount Tabor. Since the 1890s, the park has contained reservoirs that once served the city of Portland, and that are now listed on the National Register of Historic Places.

Buildings on campus include McGuire Auditorium, the Otto F. Linn Library, Gotham Hall, and the C.C. Perry Gymnasium. Bounded on the south by Southeast Division Street, the campus runs from (what would be) 65th Avenue to 70th Avenue.

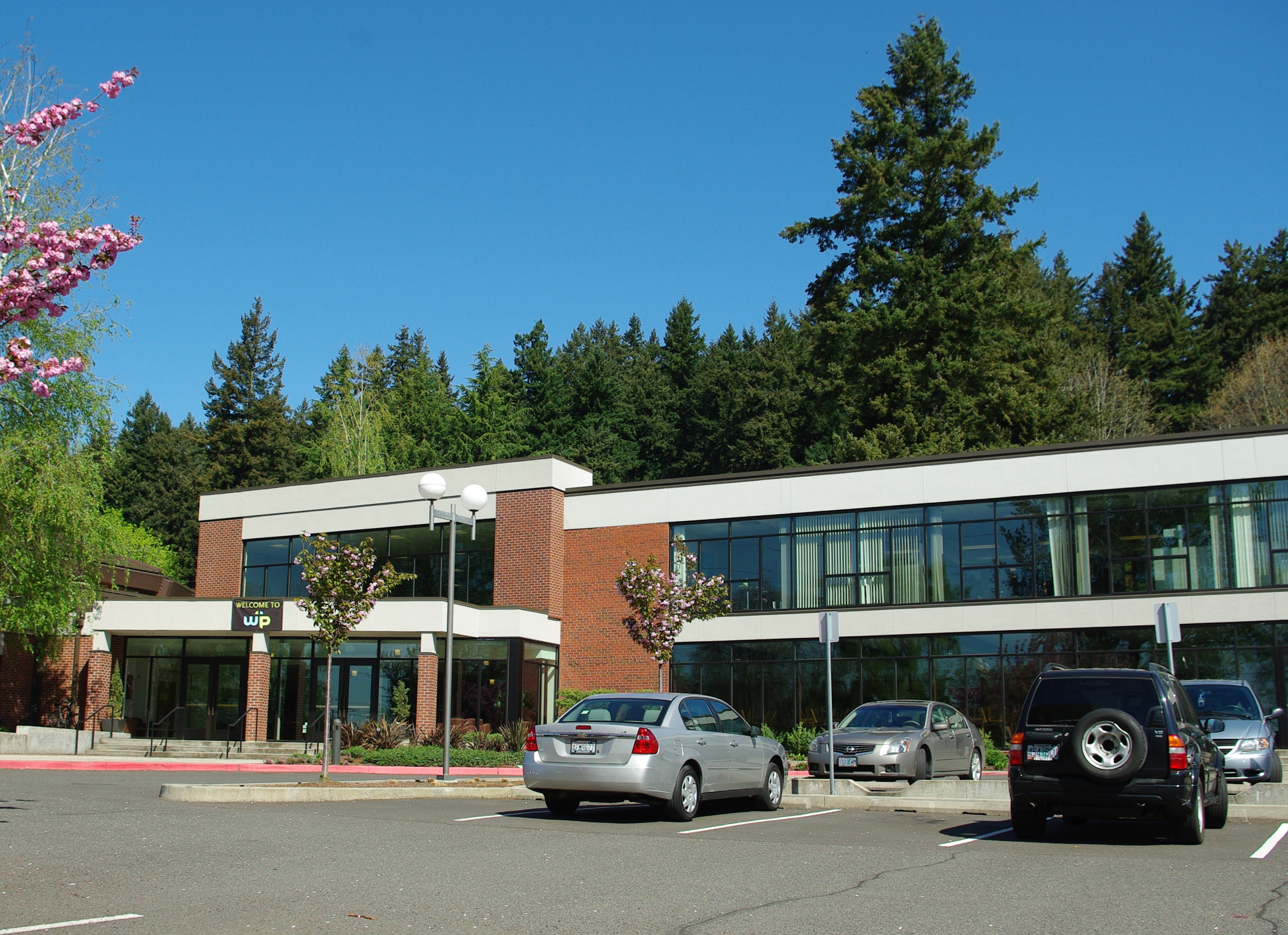
Egtvedt Hall

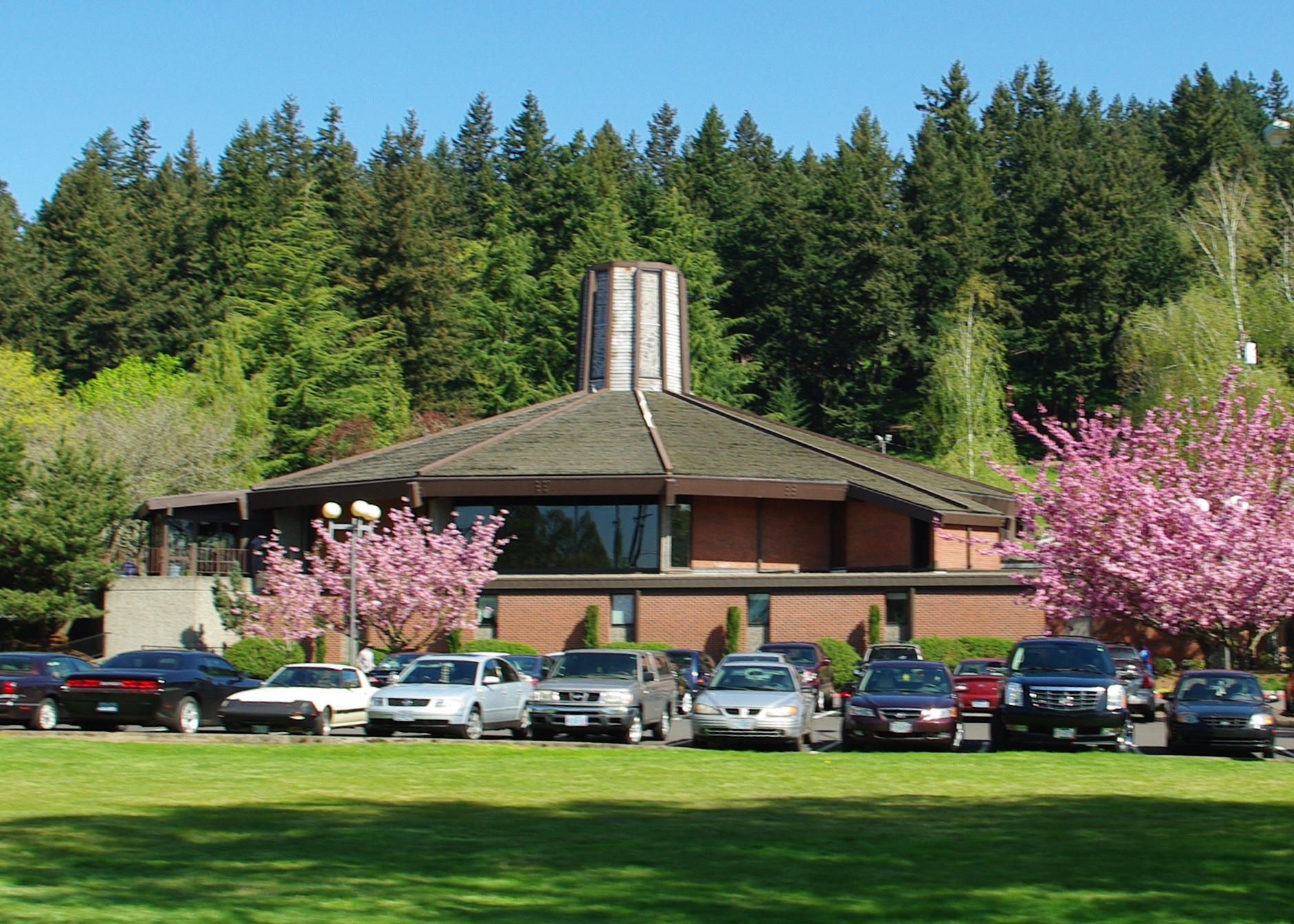
McGuire Auditorium

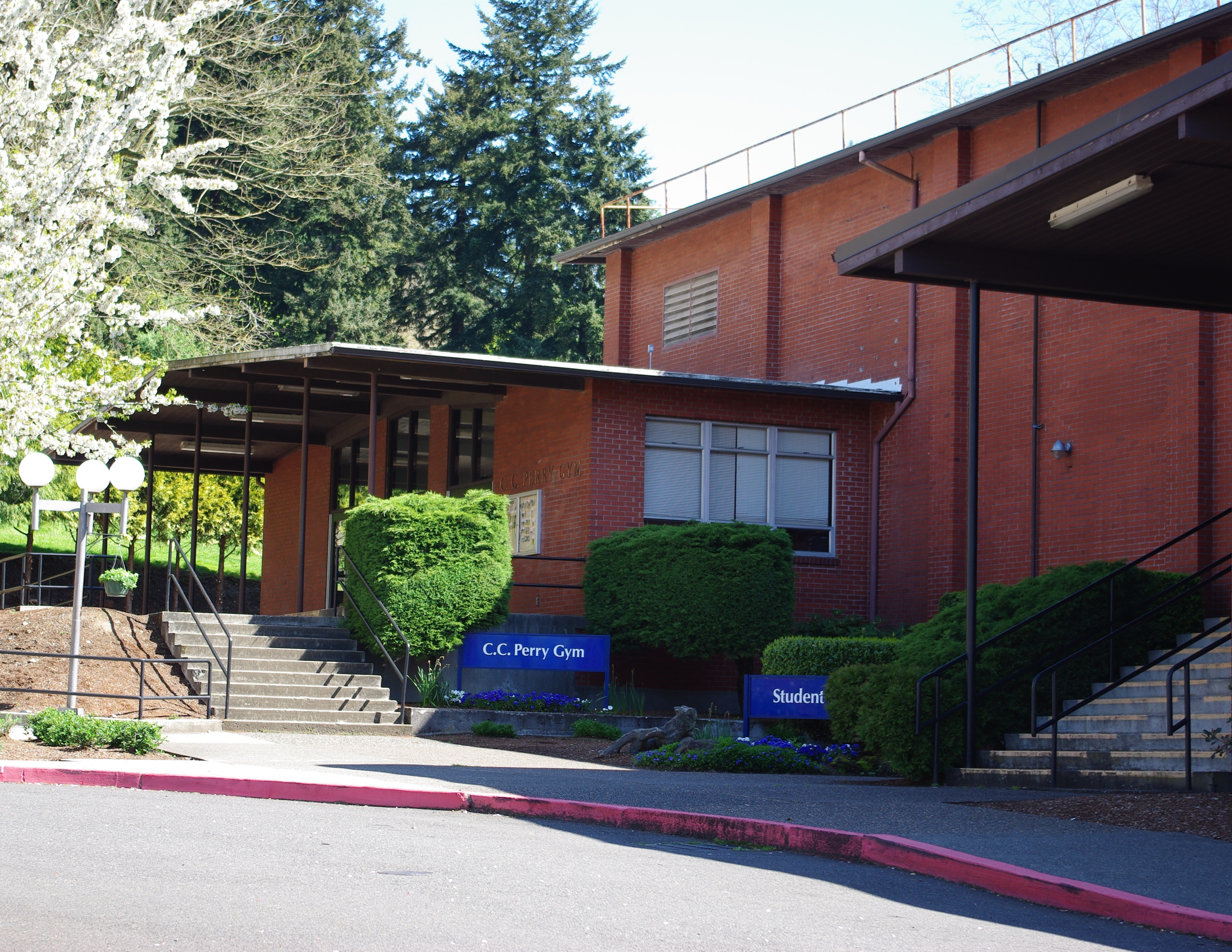
CC Perry Gym

== Athletics ==
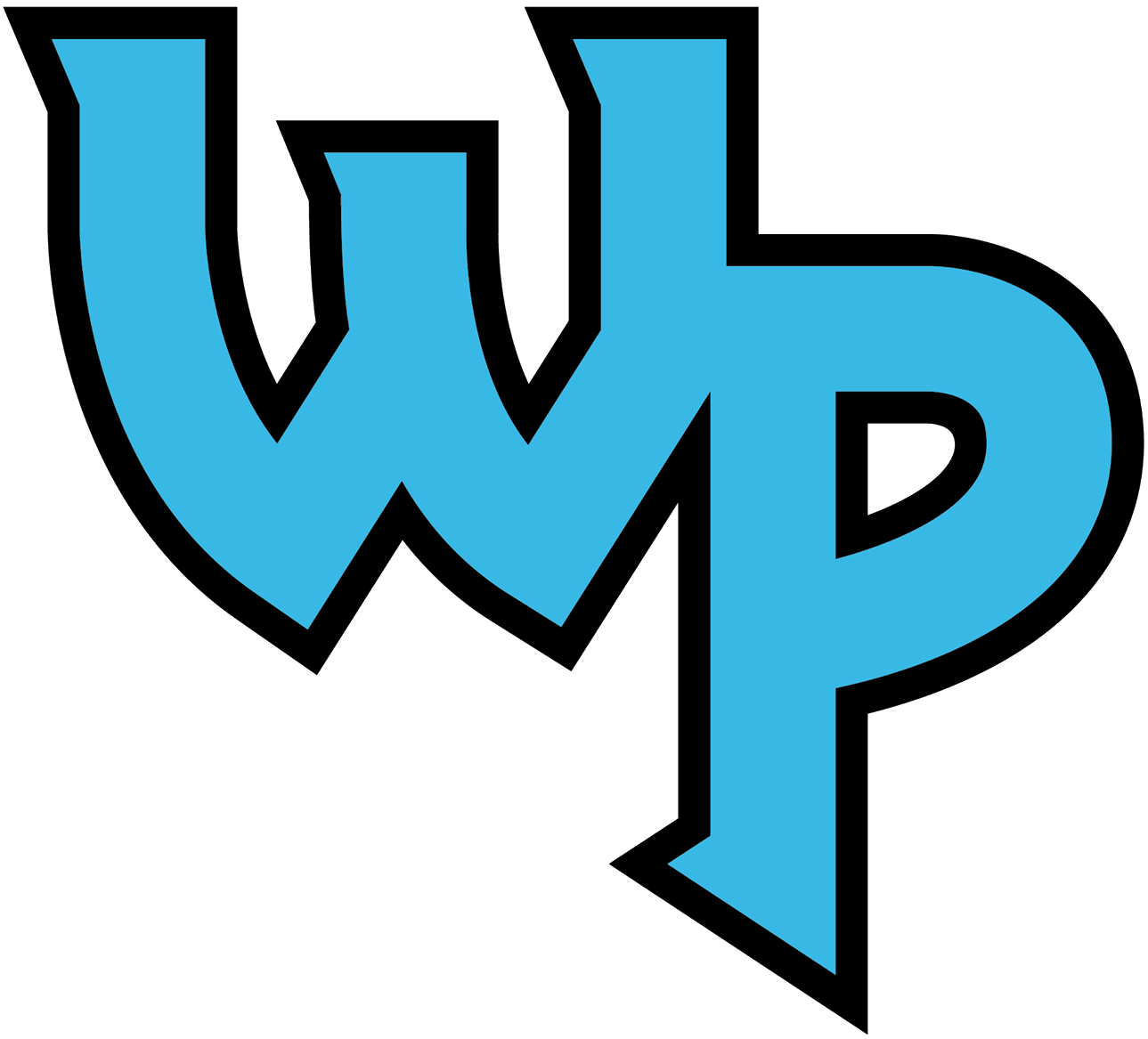
Warner Pacific athletics logo

The Warner Pacific athletic teams are called the Knights. Its athletic colors are Columbia Blue and Black. It is a member of the National Association of Intercollegiate Athletics (NAIA), competing in the Cascade Collegiate Conference (CCC).

Warner Pacific University competes in twelve collegiate sports which include baseball; softball; men's & women's basketball; men's & women's soccer; men's & women's track & field; men's & women's cross country; women's volleyball; and men's golf.

== Notable alumni ==
- Vic Gilliam, politician
- Brian Jean, Canadian politician
- Collin Malcolm (born 1997), basketball player for Hapoel Tel Aviv of the Israeli Basketball Premier League
- Mel White, clergyman, author
- William Paul Young, Canadian author
