= 1983 Fort Lauderdale Strikers indoor season =

Fort Lauderdale Strikers
1983 season
- Owner: (United States) Elizabeth Robbie
- General manager: (United States) Tim Robbie
- Manager: (England) David Chadwick
- Stadium: Tulsa Fairgrounds Pavilion; Bayfront Center; Montreal Forum
- NASL indoor: Grand Prix: Fourth place
- Top goalscorer: League: (Canada) Branko Šegota (10); All: (Canada) Branko Šegota (11)
Home colors	Away colors

The Fort Lauderdale Strikers played their third season of indoor soccer in the North American Soccer League in 1983.

== Club ==
=== Roster ===
No.	Position	Nation	Player
00	GK	USA	Craig Scarpelli
1	GK	NED	Jan van Beveren
2	DF	ROU	Alexander Szatmari
4	MF	ENG	Ray Hudson
5	DF	USA	Bruce Savage
6	MF	NED	Thomas Rongen
7	DF	ENG	Ken Fogarty
8	DF	USA	Colin Fowles
10	MF	CHI	Teófilo Cubillas
11	FW	ENG	Brian Kidd
12	MF	USA	Carl Strong
13	GK	USA	Jim Tietjens
14	MF	ENG	Keith Weller
14	FW	RSA	Steve Wegerle
16	DF	USA	Dan Canter
18	FW	USA	Robert Meschbach
20	FW	CAN	Branko Šegota
21	DF	ENG	Tony Whelan
24	DF	CAN	Bob Bolitho
25	DF	CAN	Bruce Miller
unk	FW	USA	Andrew Parkinson
unk	DF	USA	Charlie Kadupski

=== Coaching staff ===
- Head Coach: (England) David Chadwick
- Asst. Coach: (United States) Bill Nuttall

== Background ==
The 1983 indoor season was part of the club's seventeenth season in professional soccer. Previously, the NASL indoor season was played during the winter months and running through the new year, such as the 1981–82 season. This year, because five NASL teams elected not to play indoor while three others played in the MISL, the format changed to a round-robin tournament known as the 1983 NASL Grand Prix of Indoor Soccer. In addition to the Grand Prix, the Strikers played two friendlies, the first of which was a farewell of sorts from the briefly defunct Jacksonville Tea Men to their fans.

== Review ==
The team's long history of poor showings indoors looked to change this time around, because unlike in previous years most of the Strikers' marquee players decided to participate. The Grand Prix campaign started off ominously with the airline losing the team's uniforms in transit to Tulsa before their first game, and forcing them to borrow kits from their opponents.

The bad luck continued. Going into the third round of the Grand Prix, a total of 10 players were unavailable for the match. Four (Canter, Fowles, Meschbach, Savage) were trying out for Team America. Tony Whelan and Brian Kidd were battling the flu. Ken Fogarty (hamstring) and Thomas Rongen (fractured iliac) were nursing injuries, while Branko Šegota was serving a one-game red card suspension for verbally abusing a referee. Finally, Ray Hudson was in the midst of missing at least five games with a case of the mumps.

Most of this unfortunate situation happened to occur after they'd agreed to loan Keith Weller to the Roughnecks. To make matters worse, the 36 year-old Weller came alive with 8 goals and 7 assists in just six games with Tulsa. With so many line-up changes it made it nearly impossible to play with any kind of consistency. The Strikers finished the Grand Prix in fourth place. They did however reach the finals of the Molson $5,000 Shootout Challenge, which was a side competition held in conjunction with the Grand Prix.

Including friendlies, from 1977 through 1983 the Strikers posted an indoor record of 6–39, losing the final eight in a row. This would be the final year of the Fort Lauderdale Strikers as an indoor team. They sat out the 1983–84 NASL Indoor season and the club moved to Minnesota.

=== Statistics ===
Goals (worth 2 points), Assists (worth 1 point)

Leading scorers*	Goals	Assists	Points
Branko Šegota	11	9	31
Teófilo Cubillas	9	10	28
Steve Wegerle	7	6	20
Tony Whelan	4	2	10
Robert Meschbach	4	1	9
Brian Kidd	3	2	8
Bob Bolitho	3	0	6
Bruce Miller	3	0	6
Andrew Parkinson	3	0	6
Colin Fowles	1	0	2
Alexander Szatmari	1	0	2
Charlie Kadupski	0	2	2
Carl Strong	0	1	1

*includes Grand Prix and friendlies

== Competitions ==
=== $5,000 Shootout Challenge ===
- Semi-finals: Tampa Bay 3–1 Tulsa • Fort Lauderdale 3–1 Montreal
- Finals: Tampa Bay 2–0 Fort Lauderdale

=== Grand Prix preliminary round results ===
==== Round 1 ====
played at Tulsa Fairgrounds Pavilion in Tulsa, Oklahoma

January 21	Fort Lauderdale Strikers	8–4	Tulsa Roughnecks	Attendance: 3,522

January 22	Montreal Manic	8–6	Fort Lauderdale Strikers	Attendance: 4,341

==== Round 2 ====
played at the Bayfront Center in St. Petersburg, Florida

February 4	Montreal Manic	6–3	Fort Lauderdale Strikers	Attendance: 4,450

February 5	Tampa Bay Rowdies	10–6	Fort Lauderdale Strikers	Attendance: 5,545

==== Round 3 ====
played at the Tulsa Fairgrounds Pavilion in Tulsa, Oklahoma

February 11	Tampa Bay Rowdies	7–5	Fort Lauderdale Strikers	Attendance: 2,064

February 12	Tulsa Roughnecks	5–4 (OT)	Fort Lauderdale Strikers	Attendance: 3,245

==== Standings ====
G = Games, W = Wins, L = Losses, GF = Goals For, GA = Goals Against, GD = Goal Differential, PTS= point system

6 points awarded for a win. Beginning with the fourth goal, 1 bonus point awarded for each goal scored. Maximum of 5 bonus points per game.

Pos	Team	G	W	L	GF	GA	GD	PTS
1*	Montreal Manic	6	4	2	36	31	+5	42
2	Tampa Bay Rowdies	6	4	2	38	31	+7	42
3	Tulsa Roughnecks	6	3	3	33	37	-4	33
4	Fort Lauderdale Strikers	6	1	5	32	40	-8	20

*Montreal wins top seed based on 2-0 head-to-head edge over Tampa Bay

=== Playoffs rounds ===
Semifinals
1	Montreal Manic	11
4	Fort Lauderdale Strikers	4
3	Tulsa Roughnecks	6
2	Tampa Bay Rowdies	8

Championship
1	Montreal Manic	4
2	Tampa Bay Rowdies	5
Third place match
3	Tulsa Roughnecks	9
4	Fort Lauderdale Strikers	4

==== Semi-finals ====
played at the Montreal Forum in Montreal, Quebec

February 18	Montreal Manic	11–4	Fort Lauderdale Strikers	Attendance: 6,049

==== Third place match ====
played at the Montreal Forum in Montreal, Quebec (1:30 PM EDT)

February 20	Tulsa Roughnecks	9–4	Fort Lauderdale Strikers	Attendance: 7,895

== Final Grand Prix rankings ==
Pos	Team	G	W	L	GF	GA	GD
1	Tampa Bay Rowdies	8	6	2	51	41	+10
2	Montreal Manic	8	5	3	51	40	+11
3	Tulsa Roughnecks	8	4	4	48	49	-1
4	Fort Lauderdale Strikers	8	1	7	40	60	-20

== Transfers ==
Date	Position	Player	From club
4 February 1983	GK	(United States) Craig Scarpelli	St. Louis Steamers

Date	Position	Player	To club
4 February 1983	MF	(England) Keith Weller	Tulsa Roughnecks

== Non-grand prix matches ==
Before the Grand Prix began the Strikers helped the defunct Jacksonville Tea Men say thanks and goodbye to 5,000 loyal fans in a match at the Jacksonville Coliseum. Five days after the Grand Prix concluded, the Strikers played the Tampa Bay Rowdies in an indoor friendly, in Lakeland, Florida.

=== Match reports ===
January 14, 1983 1	Tea Men All-Stars	3–4	Fort Lauderdale Strikers	Jacksonville, Florida
	Zec	Report	Whelan, 59:22'; Bolitho; Šegota	Stadium: Jacksonville Coliseum; Attendance: 5,000

February 25, 1979 2	Tampa Bay Rowdies	8–5	Fort Lauderdale Strikers	Lakeland, Florida
8:00 PM (EST)	Tatu 6:15' (Gruber, Easton); Karpun 13:04'; Miller 22:55' (Pérez, Kozic); Karpun 31:35' (Fall); Gruber 44:42' (Fall); Molina 46:43' (Thompson); Bates 53:38' (Molina, McLeod); Oliveira 57:51' (Pérez, Molina)	Report p. 2-C	Kidd 13:26' (Segota); Cubillas 23:55' (Kidd); Kidd 36:14' (Whelan); Meschbach 39:31' (Kadupski, Cubillas); Kidd 54:16' (Kadupski)	Stadium: Lakeland Civic Center; Attendance: 3,506
