= Tommy Lang (footballer, born 1956) =

Irish-American soccer player

Personal information
- Full name: Thomas Lang
- Date of birth: July 14, 1956 (age 70)
- Place of birth: Dublin, Ireland
- Height: 5 ft 9 in (1.75 m)
- Position: Defender

Youth career
- Adelphi

Senior career*
Years	Team	Apps	(Gls)
1977	New York Cosmos	0	(0)
1978	Colorado Caribous	13	(0)
1979	Atlanta Chiefs	7	(0)
- * Club domestic league appearances and goals as of 19:10, 7 October 2019 (UTC)

Tommy Lang (born July 14, 1956) is an Irish-American former soccer player who played as a defender.

== Career ==
=== Early career ===
Born in Dublin, Ireland, Lang grew up on Long Island, New York. He attended local Adelphi University and won a soccer championship with the Adelphi Panthers in 1973.

=== New York Cosmos ===
Lang was part of the roster of the North American Soccer League (NASL) team New York Cosmos, in the 1977 NASL season. Sharing a club room with the likes of Pelé, Carlos Alberto, Franz Beckenbauer, and Giorgio Chinaglia, Lang failed to make a first team appearance. The Cosmos were crowned NASL Champions that year.

=== Colorado Caribous ===
The following season he joined new franchise the Colorado Caribous. The Caribous played one season in 1978 under head coaches Dave Clements, who was also a player on the team, and Dan Wood. Their home field was Mile High Stadium. The arrival of the Caribous marked the return of professional first division soccer to Denver after a two-year absence caused by the departure of the Denver Dynamos to Minneapolis in 1976. During their only season in the Mile High City, the new team compiled the worst record in the league (8-22) and finished in last place in the Central Division of the National Conference. Wearing the number 14 shirt, Lang made 13 appearances. After the season, the club moved to Atlanta to become the Atlanta Chiefs, with Lang following the team to Georgia.

=== Atlanta Chiefs ===
The Atlanta Chiefs name and logo (altered slightly) were revived in 1979 after a tean year absence with the relocation of the Colorado Caribous franchise. The team again played at Atlanta–Fulton County Stadium for three seasons and also at Omni Coliseum for two NASL Indoor seasons until folding after the 1981 season. Other players for the Atlanta Chiefs included Brian Kidd, Adrian Brooks, Keith Furphy, Victor Nogueira, Paul Child, Mark MacKain, Mark Jakobowski, Lou Cioffi, Tony Whelan, Carl Strong, Webster Lichaba, Graham Tutt, Jomo Sono, Bruce Savage, Louis and George Nanchoff.

Lang spent one season with the Chiefs, wearing the number 19 shirt. He made just seven appearances in the 1979 season. The Caribous would finish last in the Eastern Division.

== Later life ==
After leaving the Chiefs, Lang later played with the New Jersey Americans of the American Soccer League. He would also play for Lynbrook Steuben of the Long Island Soccer Football League (LISFL) for 25 years, never receiving a yellow or red card.

After finishing playing soccer, Lang earned his first head coaching position at Hofstra University in 1982. While guiding the men's program, his Flying Dutchmen had winning records each year and captured the 1985 East Coast Conference title. He later became a coach at Adelphi University and Southern Connecticut State University, where he won two Division 2 national titles. On 17 March 2015, Lang was inducted into the Long Island Soccer Hall of Fame.
