= Soccer Bowl '80 =

Soccer match

- Event: Soccer Bowl
New York Cosmos	Fort Lauderdale Strikers
3	0
- Date: September 21, 1980
- Venue: RFK Stadium, Washington, D.C.
- Man of the Match: Giorgio Chinaglia
- Referee: Paul Avis (Canada)
- Attendance: 50,768

Soccer Bowl '80 was the championship final of the 1980 NASL season. The New York Cosmos took on the Fort Lauderdale Strikers. The match was played on September 21, 1980 at RFK Stadium in Washington, D.C. The Cosmos won, 3–0, to claim their fourth league championship, and third in the past four seasons.

== Background ==
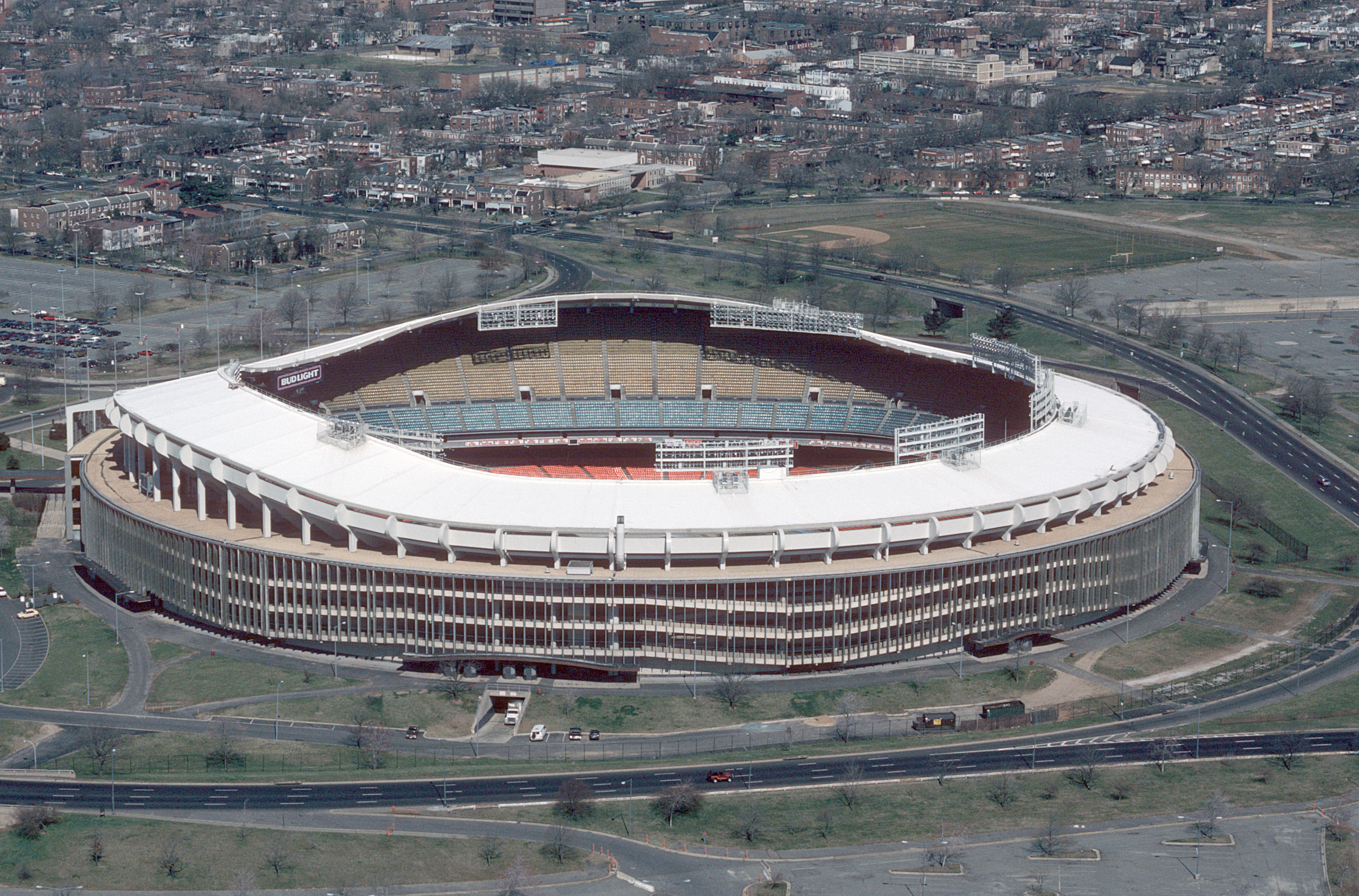
RFK Stadium was the venue for Soccer Bowl '80

=== New York Cosmos ===
The New York Cosmos qualified for the playoffs by virtue of winning the Eastern Division of the National Conference with 213 points. The Cosmos defeated the Tulsa Roughnecks in a first round series, two games to none. The first game was played on August 29, 1980 in Tulsa before a crowd of 22,890. The Cosmos won the match, 3–1. The return leg was played at Giants Stadium on August 31, 1980 before 40,285 fans. Not only did the home side win in convincing fashion, 8–1, but Giorgio Chinaglia added to his already impressive résumé by netting a record-breaking 7 goals in the contest. In the conference semifinal series they went up against the Central Division champion Dallas Tornado. Game 1 of the series saw the Cosmos win on the road, 3–2. Dallas would return the favor 4 days later on September 7, 1980 by the convincing score of 3–0. After a 10-minute intermission, the teams returned to the pitch to play a mini-game tie breaker. New York left no doubt this time, thrice scoring in the 30-minute extra session, to the delight of the 45,153 partisans assembled. The, 3–0, tie-breaker score propelled them into the National Conference finals. Their opponent, the Los Angeles Aztecs featured Brazilian stand-out Luis Fernando, who had netted 28 goals in his first 28 NASL regular season contests. Instead of Fernando, it was Chinaglia who again shined, earning 4 goals and 1 assist in a Cosmos' sweep of the series by the scores of 2–1 at the Rose Bowl and 3–1 at home, respectively. With the National Conference title wrapped up it was on to Washington, D.C. and a place in the Soccer Bowl for the third time in four years.

=== Fort Lauderdale Strikers ===
The Fort Lauderdale Strikers chose a much longer and bumpier path to the finals, a path that included three transcontinental trips. The Strikers qualified for the playoffs by virtue of a second-place finish in the Eastern Division of the American Conference with 163 points. Their opening round series was against the California Surf. The first leg was played on the West Coast in the 69,000 seat Anaheim Stadium before a pitiful crowd of 2,929 on August 28, 1980. Fort Lauderdale won that evening, 2–1. The return leg was played at Lockhart Stadium on August 31, 1980, before 15,282 Striker Likers. The Surf proved to be a worthy opponent, winning, 2–0, to send the series to a mini-game. After a scoreless 30 minutes, the teams moved on to an NASL shoot-out. The shoot-out went a then-record, 11 rounds, before Gerd Müller's second goal of the tie breaker won it for the Strikers by a 3–2 margin. In the conference semifinal series they headed west again, this time to face the Edmonton Drillers, who had themselves won the Western Division. Once again, Ft. Lauderdale took game 1 on the road at Commonwealth Stadium, this time by a score of 1–0 on September 3, 1980. Game 2 in South Florida saw the Drillers battle to a 2–2, 90 minute draw that went scoreless through 15 minutes of golden goal extra time. On to a shoot-out they went. Edmonton won the shoot-out battle, 2–1, to tie the series and a force mini-game, but they would not win the war. The home team posted a convincing, 3–0, victory in the 30-minute extra session to secure their second trip to the American Conference Finals in three years. The Strikers seemed destined to rack up a record number of frequent flyer miles at this point, as they got word that the wildcard San Diego Sockers had upset their cross-state rival Tampa Bay Rowdies that same evening. This of course meant another grueling West Coast trip, instead of the easy voyage across the state for a post-season edition of the Florida Derby. Moreover, the Sockers were now coached by Ron Newman. The Strikers had fired him at the end of the 1979 season after three years, despite his being the NASL's all-time winningest coach and leading the club to the playoffs in all three seasons. As if by a scrip and just as in the two previous series, Ft. Lauderdale won the first leg on the road by one goal, 2–1, at Jack Murphy Stadium on September 11, 1980. When the teams played the return leg two days later at Lockhart Stadium, once again the Strikers fell, this time by a 4–2 scoreline. Another convincing, 3–0, victory in yet another mini-game tie breaker secured them their first ever trip to the Soccer Bowl.

== Match details ==
September 21, 1980
12:44 p.m. EDT

New York Cosmos	3–0	Fort Lauderdale Strikers
Romero 48'; Chinaglia 71', 88'	Report

RFK Stadium, Washington, D.C.
Attendance: 50,768
Referee: Paul Avis (Canada)

NY Cosmos	FL Strikers

GK	1	(Germany) Hubert Birkenmeier
DF	2	(Iran) Andranik Eskandarian	(substituted off) 57'
DF	25	(United States) Jeff Durgan
DF	6	(Germany) Franz Beckenbauer
DF	15	(Netherlands) Wim Rijsbergen
MF	16	(United States) Angelo DiBernardo
MF	7	(Paraguay) Julio César Romero
MF	8	(Socialist Federal Republic of Yugoslavia) Vladislav Bogićević
FW	20	(Belgium) François Van der Elst
FW	9	(Italy) Giorgio Chinaglia (c)
FW	19	(Paraguay) Roberto Cabañas
Substitutes:
MF	17	(United States) Rick Davis	(substituted on) 57'
Manager:
(Germany) Hennes Weisweiler

GK	1	(Netherlands) Jan van Beveren
DF	17	(Canada) Tibor Gemeri	(substituted off) 57'
DF	3	(Netherlands) John Pot
DF	7	(England) Ken Fogarty
DF	2	(Haiti) Arsène Auguste
MF	4	(England) Ray Hudson (c)
MF	8	(United States) Colin Fowles
MF	5	(Netherlands) Lex Schoenmaker
FW	10	(Peru) Teófilo Cubillas
FW	15	(Germany) Gerd Müller	(substituted off) 40'
FW	11	(United States) Jeff Cacciatore	(substituted off) 80'
Substitutes:
FW	22	(Netherlands) Koos Waslander	(substituted on) 40'
DF	21	(United States) Rick Wiegand	(substituted on) 57'
MF	16	(United States) Mike Ortiz-Velez	(substituted on) 80'
Manager:
(Netherlands) Cor van der Hart

1980 NASL Champions: New York Cosmos

Soccer Bowl MVP:
Giorgio Chinaglia (New York)

Linesmen: Alfred Kleinaitis, Dan Goldmann

Television: ABC
Announcers: Jim McKay, Paul Gardner

Touchline reporter: Verne Lundquist

== Match statistics ==
Statistic	New York	Fort Lauderdale
Goals scored	3	0
Total shots	27	14
Shots on target	10	7
Saves	7	7
Corner kicks	11	4
Fouls	14	13
Offsides	0	2

== See also ==
- 1980 North American Soccer League season
