= 1980–81 Fort Lauderdale Strikers indoor season =

Fort Lauderdale Strikers
1980–81 season
- Owner: (United States) Elizabeth Robbie
- General manager: (United States) Tim Robbie
- Manager: (Netherlands) Cor van der Hart (fired Dec. 22) (Germany) Eckhard Krautzun
- Stadium: Hollywood Sportatorium
- NASL: Eastern Division: Fourth place
- Top goalscorer: League: (United States) Jeff Cacciatore (7 goals); All: (United States) Jeff Cacciatore (7 goals)
Home colors	Away colors

The 1980–81 Fort Lauderdale Strikers season was the second season of the team in the North American Soccer League indoor league. It was part of the club's fourteenth season in professional soccer. This year the team finished in fourth place of the Eastern Division and did not make the playoffs. Following this season, the team sat out the 1981–82 NASL Indoor season, and returned in the 1983 NASL Grand Prix of Indoor Soccer.

== Competitions ==
=== NASL indoor regular season ===
W = Wins, L = Losses, GB = Games Behind 1st Place, % = Winning Percentage, GF = Goals For, GA = Goals Against

Eastern Division	W	L	GB	%	GF	GA
Atlanta Chiefs	13	5	--	.722	97	75
Tampa Bay Rowdies	9	9	4	.500	126	120
Jacksonville Tea Men	8	10	5	.444	96	102
Fort Lauderdale Strikers	1	17	12	.056	58	125

Central Division	W	L	GB	%	GF	GA
Chicago Sting	13	5	--	.722	146	103
Minnesota Kicks	12	6	1	.667	93	73
Detroit Express	7	11	6	.389	90	106

Southern Division	W	L	GB	%	GF	GA
California Surf	10	8	--	.556	91	96
Tulsa Roughnecks	9	9	1	.500	128	109
Dallas Tornado	7	11	3	.389	100	94
San Diego Sockers	6	12	4	.333	101	121

Northern Division	W	L	GB	%	GF	GA
Vancouver Whitecaps	11	7	--	.611	91	96
Edmonton Drillers	10	8	1	.556	128	109
Calgary Boomers	10	8	1	.556	100	94
Toronto Blizzard	5	13	6	.278	101	121

Western Division	W	L	GB	%	GF	GA
Los Angeles Aztecs	11	7	--	.611	118	99
Portland Timbers	10	8	1	.556	110	93
San Jose Earthquakes	10	8	1	.556	118	115
Seattle Sounders	9	9	2	.500	106	98

=== NASL indoor playoffs ===
did not qualify
