= Koos Waslander =

Dutch football coach and former player (born 1957)

Personal information
- Date of birth: 3 February 1957 (age 69)
- Place of birth: Rotterdam, Netherlands
- Position: Midfielder

Senior career*
Years	Team	Apps	(Gls)
1979–1980	Excelsior	33	(12)
1980	Fort Lauderdale Strikers	14	(1)
1980–1983	NAC	86	(13)
1983–1984	Excelsior	16	(1)
1984–1985	PEC Zwolle '82	26	(2)
1985–1987	Excelsior	31	(1)
1987–1988	DS'79	11	(1)
Total		217	(31)

Managerial career
- 1999–2000: DRL
- 2000–2001: SV Slikkerveer
- 2002–2003: RBC Roosendaal (assistant)
- 2003–2004: VV Spijkenisse
- 2004–2005: NAC Breda (U21)
- 2005–2006: NAC Breda (assistant)
- 2006–2007: NAC Breda (youth)
- 2007–2008: DOTO
- 2009: SV Gouda (caretaker)
- 2009: DOVO (caretaker)
- 2010–2012: BVCB
- 2012–2013: Jong Ambon
- 2013–2014: SCO '63
- 2014–2015: Leonidas
- 2016–2018: EDO
- 2018: Overmaas
- 2019–2021: RBC
- * Club domestic league appearances and goals

Koos Waslander (born 3 February 1957) is a Dutch football coach and former player. He was most recently head coach of Dutch Tweede Klasse club RBC.

== Career ==
Born in Rotterdam, Waslander played in the Netherlands and the United States for Excelsior, Fort Lauderdale Strikers, NAC Breda, PEC Zwolle and DS'79.

Waslander holds the record for the quickest goal in the Eredivisie, scoring after eight seconds.

With the Fort Lauderdale Strikers he was a Soccer Bowl '80 runner up. In the final, won 3-0 by New York Cosmos in September 1980, he entered the match as a substitute five minutes before half-time for the injured German striker Gerd Müller.

== Coaching career ==
Waslander coached numerous teams in the Netherlands after his retirement, most notably VV Spijkenisse, Leonidas, and RBC. He also worked as an assistant and youth coach at NAC Breda.
