= Charlie Kadupski =

American soccer player

Personal information
- Full name: Charles J. Kadupski
- Date of birth: June 17, 1956 (age 70)
- Place of birth: Willimantic, Connecticut, U.S.
- Height: 6 ft 1 in (1.85 m)
- Position: Defender

Youth career
- 1974–1975: Mitchell College
- 1976–1977: Hartwick College

Senior career*
Years	Team	Apps	(Gls)
1978	Southern California Lazers	22	(0)
1979	Cleveland Cobras	4	(0)
1979–1980	San Jose Earthquakes	4	(0)
1980	Houston Hurricane	2	(0)
1982	Pennsylvania Stoners	0	(0)
1983	Fort Lauderdale Strikers (indoor)	1	(0)
1983	Fort Lauderdale Strikers		
1983–1984	Los Angeles Lazers (indoor)		
1984–1985	Dallas Americans		
- * Club domestic league appearances and goals

Charlie Kadupski is an American retired soccer defender who played at Lyman Memorial High School in Lebanon, Connecticut and professionally in the North American Soccer League, American Soccer League and United Soccer League.

Kadupski attended Mitchell College where he played soccer in 1974 and 1975. In 1975, Mitchell finished third in the NJCAA soccer championship. He is a member of the Mitchell College Athletic Hall of Fame. Kadupski then transferred to Hartwick College, playing on the men's soccer team in 1976 and 1977. In 1977, Kadupski and his teammates won the NCAA Men's Division I Soccer Championship. He graduated with a bachelor's degree in marketing. In 1978, he turned professional with the Southern California Lazers of the American Soccer League. He moved to the Cleveland Cobras for the 1979 season before signing with the San Jose Earthquakes of the North American Soccer League. He began the 1980 season with the Earthquakes before moving to the Houston Hurricane. He also played for the Pennsylvania Stoners of the American Soccer League. In February 1983, the Fort Lauderdale Strikers signed Kadupski after losing Dan Canter and Bruce Savage to Team America. He did appear in one indoor game in February, netting two assists, but remained an unused substitute during the Strikers' outdoor season. He spent the 1983-1985 Major Indoor Soccer League season with the Los Angeles Lazers. In 1984 and 1985, Kadupski played for the Dallas Americans of the United Soccer League.

After retiring from professional soccer, in 1989 Charlie Kadupski founded The Sport Source, which publishes the Official Athletic College Guide To Sports Colleges and Sports Scholarships. Since the company inception, he has helped thousands of aspiring college bound student-athletes utilize their academic and athletic accomplishments to receive scholarships both academically and athletically. Many of the students he has mentored has gone on to play professionally and many now coach in college while others are enjoying rewarding business careers. The Sport Source continues to meet the needs of college bound students and has one of the most comprehensive online college planning programs. With a network of 5800 Universities and over 30,000 college coaches representing 23 NCAA sanctioned sports, his goal remains the same, to ensure all kids who can make it in college, makes it to college. In 2000, Kadupski was named "Athlete of the Century" in the state of CT and in 2005, Kadupski was inducted into the Connecticut Soccer Hall of Fame. In October 2011, Hartwick College inducted Kadupski into the school's Hall of Fame.
