= Thomas Lang (disambiguation) =

Thomas Lang (born 1967) is an Austrian drummer.

Thomas Lang may also refer to:

- Thomas Lang (author) (born 1967), German writer, winner of the 2005 Ingeborg Bachmann Prize
- Thomas Lang (singer), English singer-songwriter
- Thomas Lang (cricketer) (1854–1902), English cricketer
- T. J. Lang (Thomas John Lang, born 1987), American football player
- Tommy Lang (footballer, born 1906) (1906–?), Scottish footballer
- Tommy Lang (footballer, born 1956), Irish-American footballer
- Tommy Lang (Australian footballer) (1890–1970), Australian rules footballer
- Tom Lang (born 1997), footballer
- Thomas Lang, a fictional character, protagonist of the novel The Gun Seller by Hugh Laurie

== See also ==
- Thomas Lange (disambiguation)
