= 1979–80 Fort Lauderdale Strikers indoor season =

Fort Lauderdale Strikers
1979–80 season
- Owner: (United States) Elizabeth Robbie
- General manager: (Canada) Bob Lemieux
- Manager: (England) David Chadwick (interim) (United States) Wayne Pirmann (interim) (Netherlands) Cor van der Hart
- Stadium: West Palm Beach Auditorium
- NASL: Eastern Division: Fourth place
- Top goalscorer: League: (United States) Mike Ortiz-Velez (9 goals); All: (United States) Mike Ortiz-Velez (9 goals)
Home colors	Away colors

The 1979–80 Fort Lauderdale Strikers season was the first season of the new team in the new North American Soccer League indoor league. It was part of the club's thirteenth season in professional soccer. This year the team finished in fourth place of the Eastern Division and did not make the playoffs.

== Competitions ==
=== NASL indoor regular season ===
W = Wins, L = Losses, GB = Games Behind 1st Place, % = Winning Percentage, GF = Goals For, GA = Goals Against, Av Att = Average Home Attendance

Eastern Division	W	L	GB	%	GF	GA	Av Att
Atlanta Chiefs	10	2	--	.833	70	46	5,069
Tampa Bay Rowdies	8	4	2	.667	75	64	5,910
Detroit Express	7	5	3	.583	70	69	3,937
Fort Lauderdale Strikers	3	9	7	.250	58	65	1,724
New England Tea Men	2	10	8	.167	52	81	3,249

Western Division	W	L	GB	%	GF	GA	Av Att
Memphis Rogues	9	3	--	.750	65	44	8,249
Minnesota Kicks	8	4	1	.667	75	52	9,562
Tulsa Roughnecks	7	5	2	.583	63	64	4,657
California Surf	4	8	5	.333	71	83	3,181
Los Angeles Aztecs	2	10	8	.167	56	87	2,768

=== NASL indoor playoffs ===
did not qualify
