= Ko Pot =

Dutch footballer (born 1958)

Personal information
- Date of birth: 19 May 1958 (age 68)
- Place of birth: Amsterdam, Netherlands
- Position: Defender

Senior career*
Years	Team	Apps	(Gls)
197?–1980	DWS		
1980–1982	Fort Lauderdale Strikers	64	(2)
1983–1985	FC Den Haag	66	(1)
Total		130	(3)
- * Club domestic league appearances and goals

Ko Pot (born 19 May 1958) is a Dutch former professional footballer who played as a defender.

== Career ==
Born in Amsterdam, Pot played in the Netherlands and the United States for DWS, Fort Lauderdale Strikers and FC Den Haag. With the Fort Lauderdale Strikers he was a Soccer Bowl '80 runner up. In the United States he was named John Pot.
