= Mark Mackay =

Mark Mackay can refer to:

- Mark Mackay (footballer) (born 1978), Aruban footballer
- Mark MacKay (born 1964), German ice hockey player

== See also ==
- Mark MacKain, American soccer defender
