= Craig Scarpelli =

American soccer player

Personal information
- Full name: Craig J. Scarpelli
- Date of birth: September 17, 1961 (age 65)
- Place of birth: Long Branch, New Jersey, U.S.
- Position: Goalkeeper

Youth career
- 1980: Tampa Spartans

Senior career*
Years	Team	Apps	(Gls)
1982	Georgia Generals		
1982–1983	St. Louis Steamers (indoor)	0	(0)
1983	Fort Lauderdale Strikers	0	(0)
1983	Fort Lauderdale Strikers (indoor)	6	(0)
1984	Minnesota Strikers	6	(0)
1984–1985	Minnesota Strikers (indoor)	5	(0)

International career
1980–1981	United States U20		
- * Club domestic league appearances and goals

Craig Scarpelli (born September 17, 1961) is an American retired soccer goalkeeper who played professionally in the North American Soccer League, United Soccer League and American Soccer League.

== Playing career ==
Raised in Brick Township, New Jersey, Scarpelli played prep soccer at Brick Township High School, graduating in 1979.

Scarpelli attended the University of Tampa where he played on the men's soccer team. In 1980, Scarpelli joined the United States men's national under-20 soccer team as it qualified for the 1981 FIFA World Youth Championship. He would play all three of the U.S. games in that tournament. In December 1981, the Chicago Sting selected Scarpelli in the third round of the North American Soccer League draft, but there is no indication that he signed with the Sting. In 1982, he did play for the Georgia Generals in the American Soccer League. He was also drafted by the St. Louis Steamers of the Major Indoor Soccer League, but never entered a first team game. In February 1983, the Fort Lauderdale Strikers purchased Scarpelli's contract from the Steamers. He played several games for the Strikers during the 1983 Grand Prix of Indoor Soccer. He played three pre-season games, then sat as the third string backup keeper during the regular season. Following the 1983 season, the Strikers moved to Minnesota and Scarpelli gained time in six games during the 1984 season. The league collapsed at the end of the season and the Strikers moved to the MISL for the 1984-1985 indoor season. Scarpelli played five games during the indoor season then was released in July 1985.

== Personal life ==
Scarpelli is currently a chiropractor living in Brick Township. His daughter, Leah Scarpelli, has played professional soccer internationally.
