= Kevin Fouser =

American soccer player

Personal information
- Place of birth: Atlanta, Georgia, U.S.
- Position: Forward

Senior career*
Years	Team	Apps	(Gls)
1982	Georgia Generals	?	(11)
1983	Carolina Lightnin'	?	(8)
1985	Norell Services		
1990	Georgia Steamers		

International career
1980	U.S. U-20		
- * Club domestic league appearances and goals

Kevin Fouser is an American retired soccer forward who spent two seasons in the American Soccer League and at least one in the SISL.

In 1980, Fouser played for the United States U-20 men's national soccer team which qualified for the 1981 FIFA World Youth Championship. In 1982, he played for the Georgia Generals in the American Soccer League. In 1983, he played for the Carolina Lightnin'. In 1985, he played for the amateur Norell Services of Atlanta when that team went to the 1985 U.S. Open Cup Round of Sixteen. In 1990, he played for the Georgia Steamers of the Sunbelt Independent Soccer League.
