= Ryder Mofokeng =

South African soccer player (1952–2021)

Personal information
- Full name: Johannes Mofokeng
- Date of birth: 26 January 1952
- Place of birth: Soweto, Union of South Africa
- Date of death: 2 January 2021 (aged 68)
- Height: 1.67 m (5 ft 5 1/2 in)
- Position: Right-back

Youth career
- 1966–1972: White City Lucky Brothers
- 1972–1975: Kaizer Chiefs

Senior career*
Years	Team	Apps	(Gls)
1975–1985	Kaizer Chiefs	332	(1)
- * Club domestic league appearances and goals as of 13 November 2012 ‡ National team caps and goals as of 13 November 2012

Johannes "Ryder" Mofokeng (26 January 1952 – 2 January 2021) was a South African football (soccer) defender who played for amateur club White City Lucky Brothers and Kaizer Chiefs.

== Career ==
=== Youth career ===
At White City Lucky Brothers, he was a teammate of Webster Lichaba before he was invited to play for the Chiefs reserves in 1972.

=== Kaizer Chiefs ===
During the "Golden Era" he was assigned as captain by Eddie Lewis when he was 23. He was captain for 11 years and won 4 NPSL titles and a quadruple in 1981 with Jingles Pereira, Marks Maponyane, Abednigo Ngcobo, Nelson Dladla and Vusi Lamola and more. He scored one goal in his whole career.

=== After retirement ===
He was the Kaizer Chiefs manager with Nelson Dladla in 1993. After coaching he became the goalkeeper coach at the Chiefs youth academy. He died on January 2, 2021.
