= Eckhard Krautzun =

German football manager (born 1941)

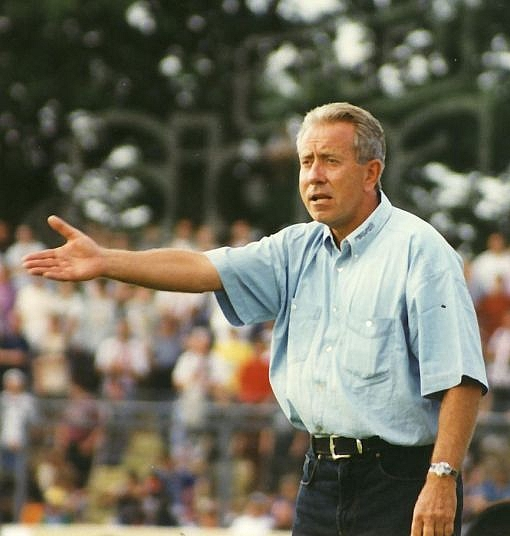
- Krautzun as FC St. Pauli manager in 1997

Personal information
- Date of birth: 13 January 1941 (age 85)
- Place of birth: Solingen, Germany

Senior career*
Years	Team	Apps	(Gls)
1966–1967	1. FC Kaiserslautern		

Managerial career
- 1969–1970: Young Fellows Zürich
- 1971: Kenya
- 1973–1975: Canada
- 1975–1977: Canada
- 1976–1977: Vancouver Whitecaps (NASL)
- 1978: Wormatia Worms
- 1978–1979: 1860 Munich
- 1980: Houston Hurricane
- 1981–1982: Fort Lauderdale Strikers
- 1983: SG Union Solingen
- 1983: Mazda Hiroshima
- 1983–1985: SG Union Solingen
- 1985–1986: Tennis Borussia Berlin
- 1986–1987: Darmstadt 98
- 1987–1988: Al Ahli Jeddah
- 1989: Darmstadt 98
- 1989–1990: Wormatia Worms
- 1990: Alemannia Aachen
- 1990–1991: SC Freiburg
- 1991–1992: Philippines
- 1992–1993: Kuala Lumpur City Hall
- 1992–1993: Malaysia
- 1993–1995: VfL Wolfsburg
- 1995–1996: Union Berlin
- 1996: 1. FC Kaiserslautern
- 1997: CS Sfaxien
- 1997: FC St. Pauli
- 1997–1999: CS Sfaxien
- 1999–2000: Darmstadt 98
- 2000–2001: Mainz 05
- 2001: Tunisia
- 2003–2005: China U20
- * Club domestic league appearances and goals

Eckhard Krautzun (born 13 January 1941) is a German football coach and former player.

== Managerial career ==
As a player, Krautzun turned out for Union Solingen, Rheydter SV, 1. FC Kaiserslautern, Young Fellows Zürich and TeBe Berlin.

In 1968, he was technical advisor of South Korea / South Korea U20.

In 1973, Krautzun was the first head coach of Canada not to hail from that country or the United Kingdom. After his resignation, Krautzun pointed to the lack of public support for amateur sports in Canada as a reason for the country's lack of success on the international stage. Krautzun went on right after resigning to coach in the NASL with the Vancouver Whitecaps (and later with the Houston Hurricane and Ft. Lauderdale Strikers). He was not a popular coach with the Whitecaps due to the defensive style of play he employed. It was only later with the Strikers (with stars such as Gerd Muller, Teofilo Cubillas, Ray Hudson and Branko Segota) where he loosened up and got his teams attacking and the Strikers had two very successful seasons getting to the semi-finals twice.

In 2001, Krautzun steered Tunisia through 2002 World Cup qualifying but resigned ahead of the tournament, citing interference from the Tunisian Football Federation with his coaching.

Krautzun was in charge of a training camp for promising Chinese youngsters in Bad Kissingen, Germany in 2006, helping prepare the younger generation of players for the 2008 Beijing Olympics.

In 2007, he acted as an adviser to the Chinese women's national team, stepping down in March of that year due to health issues.

As well as a manager, Krautzun has acted as a technical advisor and scout. He has worked extensively in North America and Asia, where he worked as a scout in China and South Korea from 2001 to 2003.

== Honours ==
VfL Wolfsburg

- DFB-Pokal: runners-up 1994–95

1. FC Kaiserslautern

- DFB-Pokal: 1995–96
