= Thomas Lange (disambiguation) =

Thomas Lange (born 1964) is a German rower and Olympic gold medallist.

Thomas Lange may also refer to:

- Thomas Lange (novelist) (1829–1887), Danish novelist

== See also ==
- Thomas Lang (disambiguation)
