= Graham Tutt =

English footballer and manager (1956–2022)

Personal information
- Date of birth: 27 August 1956
- Place of birth: London, England
- Date of death: 22 June 2022 (aged 65)
- Position: Goalkeeper

Youth career
- Plumstead royals

Senior career*
Years	Team	Apps	(Gls)
1973–1976	Charlton Athletic	65	(0)
1974–1975	→ Workington FC (loan)	4	(0)
1978–1979	Arcadia Shepherds		
1980	Columbus Magic		
1980–81	Atlanta Chiefs (indoor)	4	(0)
1981	Atlanta Chiefs	32	(0)
1982	Georgia Generals	16	(0)
1983	Anheuser Busch		
1984–1988	Atlanta Datagraphic		

Managerial career
- 1991–2001: Life University
- * Club domestic league appearances and goals

Graham Tutt (27 August 1956 – 22 June 2022) was an English professional footballer who played as a goalkeeper. After spending four seasons in England and sustaining a serious eye injury, he spent two seasons in South Africa before moving to the United States for the remainder of his career. He played two seasons in the second division American Soccer League and one in the North American Soccer League. He also finished runner up in the 1986 National Amateur Cup with Atlanta Datagraphics. After his retirement, he held numerous coaching and executive positions in the state of Georgia.

In 1974, Tutt made his professional debut with Charlton Athletic. He was seventeen at the time. During the 1975–1976 season, he went on loan with Workington FC for four games. In 1976, he suffered an eye injury which put him of action for eighteen months. In 1978, he returned to playing with the Arcadia Shepherds in the South African League. In 1979, he played for the Arcadia Pepsi which may have been the same team, under new sponsorship. During his two seasons in South Africa, he was twice selected as the Goalkeeper of the Year by the South African Press. In 1980, he moved to the United States where he spent one season with the Columbus Magic in the second division American Soccer League. He was an ASL All Star and moved up to the Atlanta Chiefs of the North American Soccer League in 1981. In 1982, he finished his professional career with the Georgia Generals of the ASL. However, he continued to play for several years on the amateur level, ironically, as a forward. In 1983, as part of the Anhauser Busch team, he led the Atlanta District Amateur Soccer League (ADASL) in scoring. In 1984, he moved to Atlanta Datagraphic Soccer Club, also in the ADASL, where he played until 1988. In 1987, Datagraphic fell to Yonkers Polish American Eagles in the final of the National Amateur Cup. He retired from playing in 1988.

After his retirement from playing professionally, Tutt turned towards coaching. From 1983 to 2004, he ran various soccer training camps throughout the state of Georgia. In 1988, he established the Canturbury Parks Soccer Complex. In 1989, he founded the Atlanta Attack of the indoor National Professional Soccer League. In 1991, he founded the men's soccer team at Life University and coached it until the school disbanded its sports program in 2001.

Tutt died on 22 June 2022, at the age of 65.
