= Carl Strong =

American soccer player

Personal information
- Date of birth: January 21, 1958 (age 68)
- Place of birth: Annandale, Virginia, United States
- Height: 5 ft 10 in (1.78 m)
- Position: Midfielder

Youth career
- 1976–1977: James Madison Dukes

Senior career*
Years	Team	Apps	(Gls)
1978	Colorado Caribous	8	(0)
1979–1981	Atlanta Chiefs	85	(4)
1979–1981	Atlanta Chiefs (indoor)	30	(1)
1981–1982	Portland Timbers (indoor)	18	(3)
1982	Portland Timbers	8	(0)
1983	Fort Lauderdale Strikers (indoor)	1	
1983	Fort Lauderdale Strikers	6	(0)
1984	Minnesota Strikers	21	(1)
1985	South Florida Sun	0	(0)
- * Club domestic league appearances and goals

Carl Strong (born January 21, 1958, in Annandale, Virginia) is a former U.S. soccer midfielder who spent seven seasons in the North American Soccer League.

Strong grew up in Virginia where attended Annandale High School. After graduating from Annandale in 1976, he entered James Madison University. He was the 1978 Virginia Intercollegiate Player of the Year.

Strong began his professional career in 1978 with the expansion Colorado Caribous of the North American Soccer League (NASL). The Caribous moved to Atlanta where the team was renamed the Atlanta Chiefs between the 1978 and 1979 season. Strong became a regular with the Chiefs, seeing time in twenty-five games in 1979, twenty-eight in 1980 and thirty-two in 1981. The Chiefs folded at the end of the season and on September 22, 1981, the Portland Timbers purchased his contract from the Chiefs.

In 1982, Strong saw limited action for the Timbers. On October 26, 1982, the Fort Lauderdale Strikers selected Strong in the dispersal draft after the Timbers folded. He first appeared as a member of the Strikers in the winter of 1983 during the NASL's Indoor Grand Prix. At about that same time he was also an invitee to the Team America try-outs, but did not make the squad. He saw time in only six outdoor games with the Strikers. However, the Strikers moved to Minnesota before the 1984 season and Strong played in twenty-one games that year.

The NASL folded at the end of the 1984 season and Strong moved to the South Florida Sun of the United Soccer League. However, he broke his leg during the pre-season. The league collapsed after six games and Strong never saw playing time with the Sun.

Strong coached the Pequannock Township High School varsity boys' soccer team in New Jersey for 19 years. He was also a physical education teacher at the high school before retiring. Strong's son, Ben, played college soccer at Virginia Tech and the University of Louisville.
