= Webster Lichaba =

South African soccer player

Personal information
- Date of birth: 6 October 1954 (age 72)
- Place of birth: Soweto, South Africa
- Position: Midfielder

Youth career
- 1969–1971: White City Lucky Brothers
- 1971–1973: Mzimhlophe Callies

Senior career*
Years	Team	Apps	(Gls)
1973–1980	Orlando Pirates		
1979–1981	Atlanta Chiefs	93	(4)
1979–1981	Atlanta Chiefs (indoor)	8	(1)
1984–1991	Jomo Cosmos		
- * Club domestic league appearances and goals

Webster "City Late" Lichaba (born 6 October 1954) is a South African former soccer player who played as a midfielder for Orlando Pirates, Atlanta Chiefs and Jomo Cosmos.

== Youth career ==
Born in Mzimhlophe, he lived a street away from Ryder Mofokeng. He played for White City Lucky Brothers with Mofokeng.

== Orlando Pirates ==
When he was signed from Mzimhlophe Callies at age 19, he became a teammate of Jomo Sono. He captained them and won three league titles with Pirates.

== Atlanta Chiefs ==
When he moved to America in 1980 the chairman was Ted Turner, the founder of CNN. He nearly earned 100 appearances for Chiefs. He also appeared in a handful of indoor matches for the Chiefs at that time

== Jomo Cosmos ==
Lichaba was brought back to his home country by his retired former teammate Jomo Sono who had acquired a team. In the 1986 season, he set the record for the most starts in a season, 46. That feat was also achieved by Helman Mkhalele in 1993. He retired at the age of 37.

== After Retirement ==
In 2001, he became an assistant coach at Supersport United and their team manager in 2003 onwards. He is also the junior academy's scout.

== Personal life ==
He is married to Buyi Radebe-Lichaba. He is the father of 4 girls, Nthabiseng, Neo, Tlholo as well as South African award winning singer, Lira.
