= Mark MacKain =

American soccer player and coach

Personal information
- Date of birth: March 10, 1961 (age 65)
- Place of birth: Orlando, Florida, U.S.
- Position: Defender

Senior career*
Years	Team	Apps	(Gls)
1979–1981	Atlanta Chiefs	1	(0)
1981–1982	New Jersey Rockets (indoor)	18	(1)
1982	Georgia Generals		
- * Club domestic league appearances and goals

Mark MacKain is an American retired soccer defender who played in the North American Soccer League, Major Indoor Soccer League and American Soccer League. He is currently a youth soccer coach.

MacKain graduated from Winter Park High School. In 1979, he signed with the Atlanta Chiefs of the North American Soccer League. In 1981, he moved to the New Jersey Rockets of the Major Indoor Soccer League for one season. In 1982, he played for the Georgia Generals in the American Soccer League. He later played for the amateur Soccer City Soccer Club in Atlanta and for Wings Soccer Club, also based in Atlanta.

MacKain became a youth soccer coach with a variety of clubs in the Atlanta area before being elected to the US Club Soccer Board of Directors in 2009.
