= Colin Fowles =

American soccer player (1953–1985)

Personal information
- Full name: Colin M. Fowles
- Date of birth: August 6, 1953
- Place of birth: Kingston, Jamaica
- Date of death: September 1, 1985 (aged 32)
- Positions: Forward; defender

College career
Years	Team	Apps	(Gls)
1972–1975	Long Island University-Brooklyn		

Senior career*
Years	Team	Apps	(Gls)
1976	Tampa Bay Rowdies	0	(0)
1977–1983	Fort Lauderdale Strikers	140	(6)
1980–1981	Fort Lauderdale Strikers (indoor)	5	(1)
1984–1985	Fort Lauderdale/South Florida Sun		

International career
1977–1980	United States	18	(0)
- * Club domestic league appearances and goals

Colin Fowles (August 6, 1953 − September 1, 1985) was a professional soccer player who died as a result of random gunfire while playing recreational soccer. He played in the North American Soccer League and United Soccer League. Born in Jamaica, he represented the United States at international level.

== Youth ==
Fowles attended Long Island University-Brooklyn from 1972 to 1975 where he played forward on the men's soccer team. He scored 24 goals over his four seasons with the team.

== Professional ==
In 1976, he was taken by the Tampa Bay Rowdies as the 19th overall pick of the North American Soccer League draft. In 1977, the Fort Lauderdale Strikers signed Fowles for the team's first season. He played with the team through 1983, its last season in Fort Lauderdale. Over his seven seasons with the Strikers, he played 140 games and scored six goals. After the Strikers moved to Minnesota in 1984, Fowles remained in Florida and played for the Fort Lauderdale Sun of the United Soccer League. In 1985, the Sun was renamed the South Florida Sun, but the team and the league folded after only six games into the season. Fowles was known as the fastest player in the NASL. He once raced a quarterhorse over 80 yards and won.

== National team ==
Fowles earned his first cap when he came on for Gary Etherington in a 2–1 victory over El Salvador on September 15, 1977. He played all eight U.S. games that year at forward, but never found the net. Beginning in 1978, the U.S. coaching staff moved Fowles to defense where he played all three games that year. He continued to play sporadically through 1979 and 1980 with his last cap coming in the last U.S. game of 1980. Fowled earned a total of 18 caps, between 1977 and 1980, but scored no goals.

== Death ==
Colin continued to live in the Coral Springs Florida area after playing professional soccer. He coached the St. Thomas Aquinas High School soccer team and played with the Lauderhill Men's Soccer Club. On August 28, 1985, he was playing in the league championship at a Park in Miami and a gang war broke out behind the goal during the game. Multiple people were shot and killed right behind the goal. After the initial shooting was over, some of the assailants tried to blend in with the crowd outside the park as fans scrambled for safety. One of the men involved in the argument pulled a gun as Colin approached him and shot multiple times at Colin and missed. Colin jumped behind a telephone pole as the shooter approached the pole and shot Colin point blank in the midsection. The ambulance that came to take him the hospital had mechanical failure and another ambulance was dispatched. Later Colin was pronounced dead at the hospital.

The Florida Sun posthumously inducted Fowles into its Hall of Fame in 1986.
