= Bill Nuttall =

American soccer player and manager

Personal information
- Full name: William Nuttall
- Date of birth: March 10, 1948 (age 78)
- Place of birth: Norristown, Pennsylvania, United States
- Height: 6 ft 3 in (1.91 m)
- Position: Goalkeeper

Youth career
- 1967–1970: Davis & Elkins College

Senior career*
Years	Team	Apps	(Gls)
1971–1973	Delaware Wings		
1974–1975	Miami Toros	19	(0)
1976	Fort Lauderdale Strikers	0	(0)

Managerial career
- 1975–1979: Florida International University
- 1980–1984: Fort Lauderdale Strikers (assistant)
- * Club domestic league appearances and goals

Bill Nuttall (born March 10, 1948, in Norristown, Pennsylvania) is an American soccer figure renowned for his multifaceted career as a player, coach, broadcaster, and executive, spanning over five decades and contributing significantly to the sport's growth in the United States.

He was a first team Junior College and first team NSCAA All-American soccer goalkeeper who spent at least three seasons in the American Soccer League and three seasons in the North American Soccer League. He was the 1970 first team All American goalkeeper, coached at both the collegiate and professional levels and was the General Manager of the United States Soccer Federation teams from 1991 to 1994.

== Club career ==
Nuttall grew up in King of Prussia, Pennsylvania. He attended Davis & Elkins College, playing on the men's soccer team from 1967 to 1970. The team won the 1968 and 1970 NAIA national men's soccer championship and finished runner up in 1969. One of his teammates was Hank Steinbrecher. Nuttall was the 1969 NAIA Tournament MVP and the 1970 first team All American goalkeeper. Nuttall was inducted into the Davis & Elkins Hall of Fame in 1991. In 1971, Nuttall signed with the Delaware Wings in the American Soccer League. In 1974, he moved to the Miami Toros of the North American Soccer League when his old coach from Davis & Elkins became the Toros' head coach. Following the 1976 team, the Toros moved to Fort Lauderdale, Florida and became the Fort Lauderdale Strikers. Nuttall made the move, but never played for the Strikers. He was replaced on the roster by former England international Gordon Banks.

== Coach ==
Florida International University hired Nuttall in 1975 to coach the men's soccer team. He held that position for five seasons, compiling a 56-18-1 record. In 1979, he was the play by play commentator for ESPN's first soccer broadcast, a college game between Indiana University and the University of Minnesota. Nuttall then worked as an assistant coach with the Fort Lauderdale Strikers from 1979 to 1984.

== Executive ==
Nuttall served as the Director of Player Personnel for the Dallas Sidekicks from 1984 to 1985. In 1985, he became a Vice President of Marketing and Promotion with Mitre Sports International. In July 1991, the United States Soccer Federation hired Nuttall as General Manager for the U.S. national teams. In September 1998, he became President of Diadora America. He was the owner of Golden Viking Sports before retiring around 2015.
