= Lou Cioffi =

American soccer player (born 1957)

Personal information
- Full name: Lou Cioffi, III
- Date of birth: February 23, 1957 (age 69)
- Place of birth: The Bronx, New York, United States
- Position: Goalkeeper

College career
Years	Team	Apps	(Gls)
1978–1979	UCF Knights		

Senior career*
Years	Team	Apps	(Gls)
1980–1981	Atlanta Chiefs	17	(0)
1980–1981	Atlanta Chiefs (indoor)	16	(0)
1981	New Jersey Rockets (indoor)	2	(0)
1981–1983	Cleveland Force (indoor)	17	(0)
1984–1985	Chicago Sting (indoor)	12	(0)
1986	Orlando Lions		
1987	Orlando City		
1989	Orlando Lions		
- * Club domestic league appearances and goals

Lou Cioffi (born February 23, 1957) is an American retired soccer goalkeeper who played professionally in the North American Soccer League, Major Indoor Soccer League, and American Soccer League.

Cioffi transferred to the University of Central Florida where he played on the men's soccer team in 1978 and 1979. In February 1980, Cioffi was cut by the Atlanta Chiefs during the preseason training camp. In May 1980, the Chiefs signed Cioffi as a free agent after Victor Nogueira was injured. He then played the 1980-1981 NASL Indoor season with the Chiefs. He spent one more outdoor season with the Chiefs before moving to the New Jersey Rockets of the Major Indoor Soccer League in the fall of 1981. In 1986, he returned to Florida to complete his bachelor's degree. In addition to attending school, he played for the independent Orlando Lions. In 1987, he played for Orlando City. In 1989, he returned to the Lions, which were then playing in the third American Soccer League.
