= Bruce Miller (soccer) =

Canadian soccer player

Personal information
- Date of birth: May 25, 1957 (age 69)
- Place of birth: Vancouver, British Columbia, Canada
- Positions: Forward; midfielder; defender

College career
| Years | Team | Apps | (Gls) |
| 1975–1976 | Simon Fraser Clan | | |

Senior career*
| Years | Team | Apps | (Gls) |
| 1975 | Vancouver Whitecaps | 2 | (0) |
| 1975 | Seattle Sounders | 1 | (0) |
| 1978–1980 | Seattle Sounders | 24 | (2) |
| 1979–1980 | Cleveland Force (indoor) | 9 | (4) |
| 1982–1983 | Fort Lauderdale Strikers | 39 | (4) |
| 1983 | Fort Lauderdale Strikers (indoor) | 1 | (2) |
| 1984 | Minnesota Strikers | 13 | (1) |
| 1984–1986 | Minnesota Strikers (indoor) | 51 | (8) |

International career
| 1975–1984 | Canada | 8 | (2) |

Managerial career
- 1995–2002: Cleveland Crunch
- * Club domestic league appearances and goals

Bruce Miller (born May 25, 1957) is a Canadian retired soccer player who played professionally in the North American Soccer League, and Major Indoor Soccer League. He also earned eight caps with the Canada national team and coached the Cleveland Crunch to two National Professional Soccer League titles. He now coaches youth soccer in Northern Ohio.

== Player ==
=== Youth ===
Miller played collegiate soccer with Simon Fraser University in 1975 and 1976. SFU reached the NAIA national men's soccer championship finals in 1975 and won the championship 1976.

=== Professional ===
In 1975, Miller began playing with the Vancouver Whitecaps. He saw time in two games before moving to the Seattle Sounders where he played only one game that season. As mentioned above, he then played the 1975 and 1976 college seasons with Simon Fraser. In 1978, he returned to the pros with the Sounders. He continued to play for the Sounders through at least the 1980 season. In the fall of 1979, the Sounders loaned Miller to the Cleveland Force of the Major Indoor Soccer League. There is no record of him playing in 1981. In 1982, Miller signed with the Fort Lauderdale Strikers. Miller was a 1983 NASL All-Star Honorable Mention with the Strikers. Following the 1983 season, Joe Robbie, owner of the Strikers, moved the team to Minneapolis, Minnesota and renamed the team the Minnesota Strikers. Miller made the move north and continued to play for the Strikers in the NASL's last season, 1984. The Strikers then moved to the MISL where Miller played two indoor seasons. Miller was forced to retire in 1986 due to complications from knee injury.

=== National team ===
Miller played eight times for Canada. He made his 1975 debut against Cuba at 17 years, 6 months of age which until as recently as the late 1990s was (and still may be) the youngest 'A' international debut of a Canadian. Miller went on to play 6 more times in 1980, and a final time in 1984 against Haiti.

== Coach ==
After his retirement from playing, Miller spent six years coaching soccer at the Minnesota Sports Center. Miller was head coach of the Cleveland Crunch of the National Professional Soccer League for 5 1/2 seasons. The Crunch hired him in September 1995. He led them to two league championships, in 1996 and 1999. The Crunch fired him in March 2002.

Miller is currently an Under-11 and U-13 coach with the Northern Alliance Soccer League.
