= Bruce Savage =

American soccer player and coach

Personal information
- Full name: William Bruce Savage
- Date of birth: December 21, 1960 (age 65)
- Place of birth: Hollywood, Florida, United States
- Height: 5 ft 9 in (1.75 m)
- Position: Defender

Youth career
- 1978–1979: Miami-Dade North Junior College

Senior career*
Years	Team	Apps	(Gls)
1980–1981	Atlanta Chiefs	64	(0)
1980–1981	Atlanta Chiefs (indoor)	18	(3)
1982–1983	Fort Lauderdale Strikers	29	(0)
1983	→ Team America (loan)	30	(1)
1983–1984	Phoenix Pride (indoor)	35	(5)
1984–1992	Baltimore Blast (indoor)	347	(38)
Total		524	(47)

International career
1983–1992	United States	16	(0)

Managerial career
- Gulf Breeze High School
Medal record
Representing United States
Winner	CONCACAF Gold Cup	1991
Men's Soccer
- * Club domestic league appearances and goals

William Bruce Savage is an American former soccer player who played as a defender. He played four seasons in the North American Soccer League, nine in Major Indoor Soccer League and earned sixteen caps with the U.S. national team between 1983 and 1992. On March 12, 2014, it was announced that he would be a 2014 inductee into the Indoor Soccer Hall of Fame. He currently coaches youth soccer in Florida.

== Player ==
=== Youth ===
Savage grew up in Florida and graduated from Miami Norland High School in 1978. He attended Miami-Dade North Junior College where he played soccer in 1978 and 1979.

=== Professional ===
He joined the Atlanta Chiefs of the North American Soccer League in 1980 and played two seasons with the team. The Chiefs folded at the end of the 1981 season and the Portland Timbers purchased Savage's contract from the Chiefs. However, the Timbers traded Savage to the Fort Lauderdale Strikers where he played the 1982 season. In 1983, the U.S. Soccer Federation attempted to create a more successful U.S. national team by entering the team into the NASL as a franchise. As a result, the Strikers loaned Savage to Team America for the 1983 season. However, the team stumbled to a 10–20 record and the bottom of the league standings in 1983 and USSF pulled it from the NASL at the end of the year. Savage returned to the Strikers who sold his contract to the Phoenix Pride of the Major Indoor Soccer League. In July 1984, the Pride sold Savage's contract to the Baltimore Blast of Major Indoor Soccer League (MISL). Savage remained with the team through the 1991–1992 season when the MISL folded and the Blast moved to the National Professional Soccer League. Since Savage joined the Blast in 1981, he bounced between the outdoor NASL and indoor MISL until the end of the 1983 season when he devoted himself to the indoor game. Savage became a regular in the All Star games, being named the 1986-1987 MISL Defender of the Year and was a first team MISL All Star in 1986-1987 and 1988–1989. In February 2005, the Baltimore Blast inducted Savage into the team's Hall of Fame.

=== National team ===
In 1983, Savage earned his first cap with the national team in the team's only game that year, a 2–0 victory over Haiti. In 1984, Savage was an integral part of the U.S. Olympic team which competed at the 1984 Summer Olympics in Los Angeles. He played all three games as the team ran to a 1-1-1 record and failed to qualify for the second round. In 1991, Bora Milutinović, recently hired as the national team coach, called Savage back into the team for the first time since 1984. Savage then played most of the national team games through the end of 1992. He earned a total of 16 caps.

== Coach ==
He coaches the Gulf Breeze High School boys team. In February 2008, Savage led Gulf Breeze to the FHSAA State Final Four for the fifth time in the school's history. In the semi-finals the Dolphins defeated top-ranked Meritt Island 1–0 in overtime from a goal by Brad Parrish, marking the first time GBHS has ever played in a state championship game. In the finals, they lost to Nease (Ponte Vedra Beach) 2–1. This 4A state runner-up team produced three all-state players from the Class of 2008. He is also a coach at Bayside Soccer Club.

His son, Keith Savage, was drafted by Chivas USA in 2008. Keith played for the Tampa Bay Rowdies.
