= Ray Hudson =

English football player and manager (born 1955)

Personal information
- Full name: Raymond Wilfred Hudson
- Date of birth: 24 March 1955 (age 71)
- Place of birth: Gateshead, England
- Position: Midfielder

Senior career*
Years	Team	Apps	(Gls)
1974–1977	Newcastle United	25	(1)
1975	→ Greenock Morton (loan)	4	(0)
1977	→ Fort Lauderdale Strikers (loan)	25	(4)
1978–1983	Fort Lauderdale Strikers	151	(38)
1983–1984	Union Solingen	10	(0)
1984	Minnesota Strikers	21	(2)
1984–1988	Minnesota Strikers (indoor)	112	(41)
1987	Edmonton Brick Men	17	(4)
1988–1989	Fort Lauderdale Strikers	?	(?)
1990	Tampa Bay Rowdies	13	(2)
1991	Fort Lauderdale Strikers	?	(?)

Managerial career
- 2000–2001: Miami Fusion
- 2002–2004: D.C. United
- * Club domestic league appearances and goals

Raymond Wilfred Hudson (born 24 March 1955) is an English former football player, manager and commentator who works as a radio host for SiriusXM FC 157.

Hudson started playing professionally at 17, in 1973, with Newcastle United. Nicknamed "Rocky" by Newcastle supporters, he stayed with the First Division side for four years before moving to the United States, playing with various teams for 15 years.

When Hudson finished his playing career, he started coaching. He was named the head coach of the Miami Fusion in the middle of the 2000 Major League Soccer season. He was then hired by D.C. United in January 2002 to be their head coach before being replaced in 2004.

Hudson then began a broadcasting career as color commentator in television and radio. In 2012, he joined Sirius XM Radio as the morning show host of The Football Show on SiriusXM FC 157.

== Playing career ==
Hudson signed with Newcastle United in 1973 at the age of 17, from local team Whickham Juniors. He made 25 appearances for Newcastle and fans there nicknamed him "Rocky". After four years in the Football League First Division, Hudson moved to the United States, playing for the Fort Lauderdale Strikers of the North American Soccer League from 1977 to 1983. His former teammate at Newcastle, Paul Cannell, who like Hudson had struggled to get a first team place, in his book Fuckin' Hell It's Paul Cannell, claimed he was one of the people responsible for getting Hudson to play his football in America. Cannell had spell on loan at the Washington Diplomats in the 1970s. When Cannell came back to Newcastle, Hudson, was keen to know what life and playing football was like in the US. Cannell claimed he gave Hudson tales of sex, drugs, rock and roll and football. In the next season Cannell played against Fort Lauderdale Strikers, a team full of world class players, and he explained Hudson was by far the best player on the pitch... Hudson played the winter season of 1983–84 in Germany with Union Solingen, making 10 appearances without scoring. Hudson also played for the Strikers following their move to Minnesota in 1984, which proved to be the league's final year. Over the course of his eight years in NASL, Hudson scored 44 goals in 197 matches with 99 assists, and was named to five All-NASL squads, including once as a Best XI in 1984.

He followed this with a season playing for Edmonton Brick Men before joining the Fort Lauderdale Strikers of the American Soccer League. After a knee injury sidelined him, the Strikers released him. He spent one season (1990) playing for cross-state rivals Tampa Bay before returning to the Strikers in 1991. By this time the team was playing in the American Professional Soccer League. He was released by the Strikers when the club was mired in a four-match scoreless streak to begin the season. In 1992, he injured his other knee while playing in an NASL reunion match between NASL-era Strikers and Rowdies.

== Coaching ==
After starting out as the Miami Fusion's community outreach director and TV commentator, Hudson was named its head coach in the middle of the 2000 season, finishing the season with an 11–1–12 record. He led the club to the best regular season record in Major League Soccer (the MLS Supporters' Shield) in 2001 with 16 wins, 5 draws, and 5 losses. However, the club was defeated by the San Jose Earthquakes in the semifinal round of the playoffs.

Hudson quickly became known for his fiery personality. One memorable incident occurred after a Miami home win against the Tampa Bay Mutiny. The Fusion scored five goals, usually considered an excellent performance, but Hudson was apparently unsatisfied. He stormed into the media tent and up to the podium. He said, "I've got nothing to say. Any questions? ANY QUESTIONS? No? OK!" and stormed right back out. Interviews with players after the game indicated that Hudson was angered by a perceived lack of effort, even with the Fusion's dominant win.

Following MLS's contraction of the Fusion, Hudson was hired to replace Thomas Rongen as head coach of D.C. United on 8 January 2002. He continued to regale fans and journalists with his wit, stories, and quotes. He said, "There's a lot of talent on this team, and I'm talking Anna Nicole Smith type of talent!" upon taking control of the team in 2002. D.C. United finished at the bottom of the table in the East in 2002 with a record of 9–5–14, and were ousted in the first round by Chicago Fire by a 4–0 aggregate score in the two-game series in 2003. "Someone get me a blindfold and a cigarette!" he said during the post-game news conference. He was replaced by Piotr Nowak in 2004.

Hudson's cumulative record as an MLS head coach stands at 46–20–44.

== Commentating ==
He worked for ESPN's World Cup coverage in 2002, and came up with a memorable quote after the United States drew 1–1 with South Korea in group play. Expounding upon whether U.S. goalkeeper Brad Friedel should be thanking his defenders for their work, he said, "I'll be kissing their bums in the showers."

Beginning with the 2004–2005 season, Hudson began commentating for GolTV. He was a co-commentator for European league matches and a co-host of American Soccer until his final appearance on the show on 29 August 2007. During the 2006 World Cup, he was a co-host for the English-language segment of the nightly Gol TV En Alemania wrap-up show.

In 2012, Hudson joined Sirius XM Radio as lead commentator on SiriusXM FC 85, the service's soccer channel. Hudson hosts The Football Show with Charlie Stillitano, Neil Barnett, and Phil Schoen, which airs weekdays at 7am Eastern Time. His listeners refer to him as 'Rocky' which was his nickname back in his playing days. He is the centerpiece of Hudson's Howlers, a monthly feature highlighting his most outrageous comments. That same year, he also joined the new network BeIN Sports.

Hudson's commentating style, which mimics fellow Geordie, famous darts commentator Sid Waddell, consists of metaphors and excited, romanticized descriptions (e.g., "magisteeerial") of players and goals, has both earned him praise and been described as "ludicrous."

In March 2020, it was announced that Hudson would serve as color commentator for Inter Miami CF of Major League Soccer.

In September 2022, Hudson left BeIN Sports and joined CBS Sports for its television coverage of the UEFA Champions League.

In September 2025, Hudson announced to The Athletic that he was retiring from football commentary.

== Sources ==
Books

- Cannell, Paul (2012), Fuckin Hell' It's Paul Cannell, Poodle Publishing, ISBN 9781475020793
