= Cor van der Hart =

Dutch footballer (1928–2006)

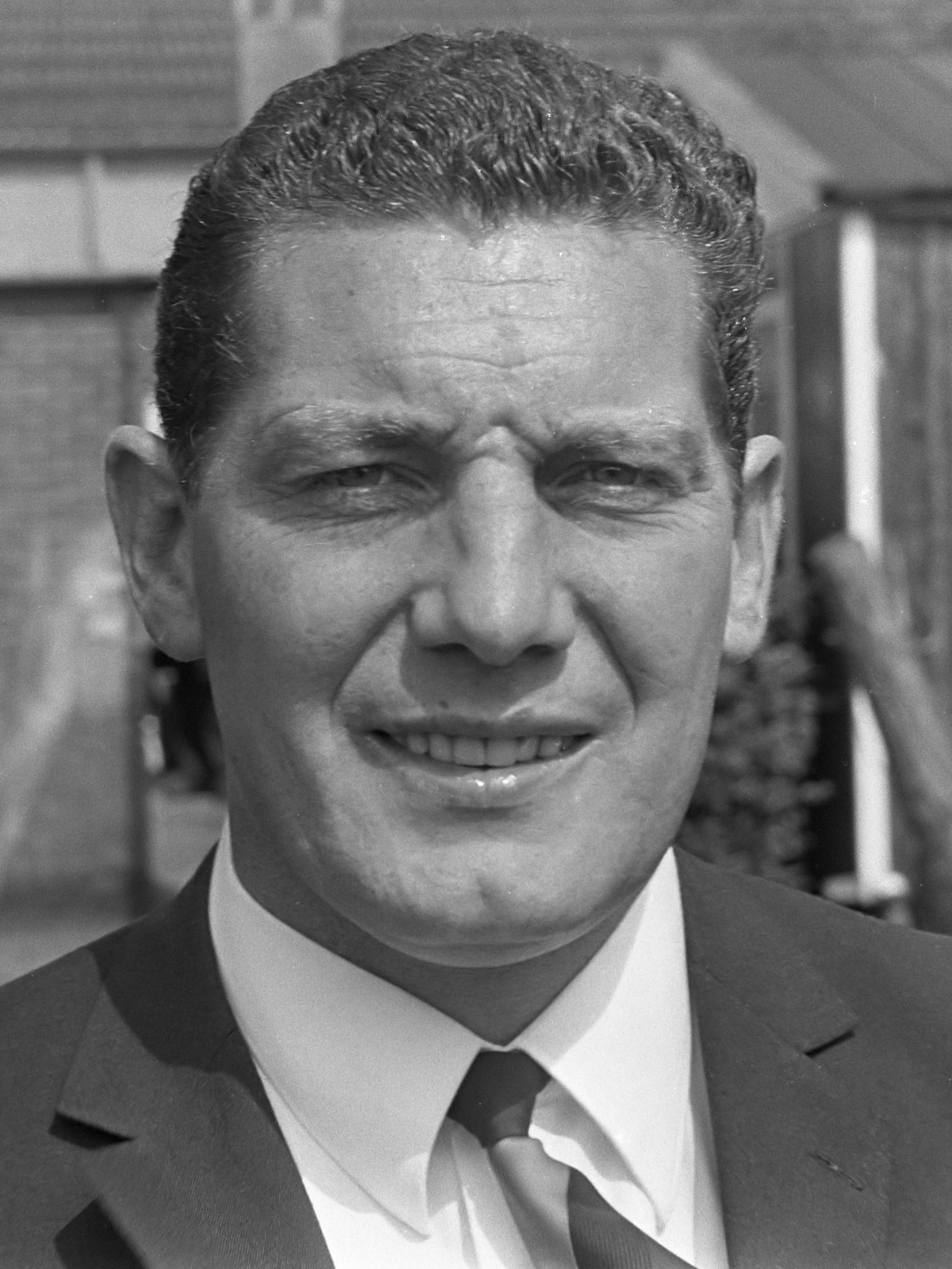
- Van der Hart in 1968

Personal information
- Full name: Cor van der Hart
- Date of birth: 25 January 1928
- Place of birth: Amsterdam, Netherlands
- Date of death: 12 December 2006 (aged 78)
- Place of death: Amstelveen, Netherlands
- Position: Defender

Youth career
- –1946: Ajax

Senior career*
| Years | Team | Apps | (Gls) |
| 1947–1950 | Ajax | 55 | (1) |
| 1950–1954 | Lille | 114 | (5) |
| 1954–1966 | Fortuna '54 | 331 | (14) |
| Total | | 500 | (20) |

International career
| 1955–1961 | Netherlands | 44 | (2) |

Managerial career
- 1966–1971: Holland Sport
- 1971–1973: AZ '67
- 1973–1974: Netherlands (assistant)
- 1974–1976: Standard Liège
- 1976–1977: Fortuna Sittard
- 1977–1978: AZ '67
- 1978: FC Amsterdam
- 1980: Fort Lauderdale Strikers
- 1980–1981: MVV
- 1981–1983: FC Den Haag
- 1983: Volendam
- 1984/85–1987: Ajax (assistant)
- 1987–1988: Telstar
- 1988–1989: Wydad
- 1989–1990: Sarıyer
- * Club domestic league appearances and goals

Cor van der Hart (25 January 1928 – 12 December 2006) was a Dutch footballer. He is known as one of the best defenders of the Netherlands national team in history, who was physically strong, who read the game very well and who had a quality kicking technique.

== Playing career ==
Van der Hart was born in Amsterdam and as a youngster he tried out for the famous youth academy of Ajax. He attended a young talent day held at the club and out of 300 players only two were chosen to represent the club: Van der Hart and Rinus Michels. He made his Ajax debut in 1947 and won the Eredivisie title in the same year.

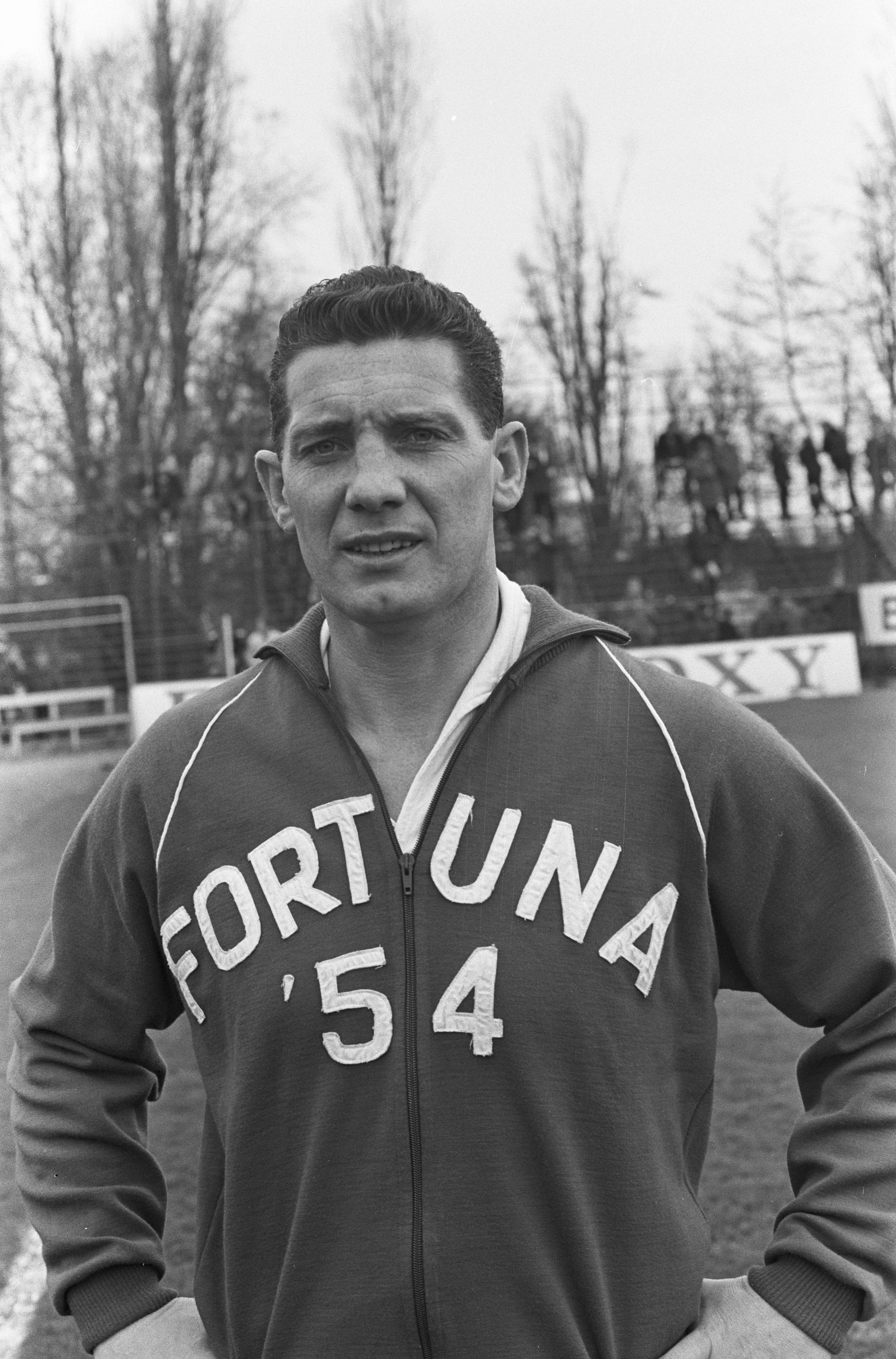
Cor van der Hart in 1966

After Faas Wilkes, Van der Hart was the third Dutch player to move abroad to become a professional footballer as more players decided it was time to leave the country and make a job out of their hobby. Van der Hart moved to France to play for Lille OSC. The Royal Dutch Football Association (KNVB) suspended all players that left the country to play professionally abroad, including Van der Hart.

Van der Hart was one of the players to play the Watersnoodwedstrijd of 12 March 1953, a match played in the Parc des Princes stadium in Paris to raise money for the victims of the North Sea flood of 1953. In 2003, Van der Hart told Dutch public broadcaster NOS that players such as himself and Bram Appel, Theo Timmermans, Bertus de Harder and Kees Rijvers had heard of the flood over the radio and realised their country was in a state of panic. While the KNVB, which still did not want to be connected to the professionals in any way, forbade the match, it went ahead after a personal intervention from Prince Bernhard. 8,000 Dutch fans travelled to Paris to attend the fixture and saw their team beat a strong France national team 2–1. The match played a crucial role in introducing professional football in the Netherlands; In 90 minutes, the players showed the spectators how much further players could improve when they played the sport professionally. Only 17 months later, the first professional match in the Netherlands was played.

When professional football started in the Netherlands, Van der Hart returned to his native country to play for Fortuna '54, which at the time was one of the dominant teams in the country. With Fortuna '54, Van der Hart won the KNVB Cup in 1957.

In 1955, Van der Hart made his debut for the Netherlands national team in a match versus Denmark. He would go on to earn 44 caps for "Oranje", 26 of which as captain. He scored two international goals. One of the most memorable international matches Van der Hart was a part of was a 2–1 away win against world champions West Germany in 1956. He played his last international match in 1961.

== Coaching career ==
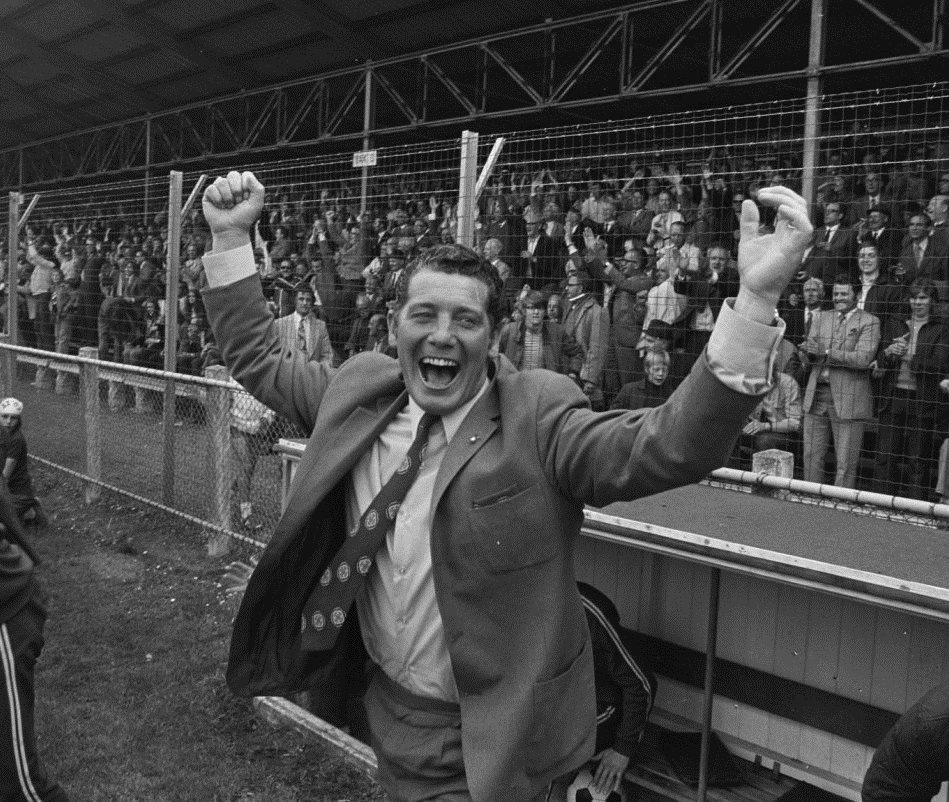
Cor van der Hart as a coach in 1972

After his playing career, Van der Hart became a football manager, starting at Holland Sport in 1966. He also managed AZ '67, Standard Liège, Fortuna Sittard, Fort Lauderdale Strikers, FC Amsterdam, MVV, FC Den Haag, FC Volendam, Telstar, Wydad AC, the Ajax youth academy (from 1985) and Sariyerspor. In 1973, he was added to the staff of the Netherlands national team as an assistant manager alongside Frantisek Fadrhonc. During the 1974 FIFA World Cup, he was the assistant of Rinus Michels as the Dutch national team lost the final to Germany. In 1978, he won the Dutch Cup (KNVB-Cup) with AZ '67, (a 1–0 victory over Ajax) while finishing third in the Dutch league. In 1980 he coached Fort Lauderdale to the NASL's American Conference title, and a runner-up finish in Soccer Bowl '80.

== Later life ==
In 1999 Van der Hart wore the orange shirt one more time, when he was selected to the so-called "Oranje of the Century team".

Van der Hart died on 12 December 2006 at the age of 78. Ajax played with black arm bands in Van der Hart's memory in their 2006–07 UEFA Cup tie against Zulte Waregem.

Van der Hart's grandson Mickey is a goalkeeper who attended the Ajax youth academy and played for PEC Zwolle and for Polish Ekstraklasa side Lech Poznań.

== Career statistics ==
Appearances and goals by national team and year
| National team | Year | Apps | Goals |
|---|---|---|---|
| Netherlands | 1955 | 7 | 1 |
| Netherlands | 1956 | 7 | 0 |
| Netherlands | 1957 | 8 | 0 |
| Netherlands | 1958 | 6 | 1 |
| Netherlands | 1959 | 7 | 0 |
| Netherlands | 1960 | 6 | 0 |
| Netherlands | 1961 | 3 | 0 |
| Total | | 44 | 2 |
