= Fort Lauderdale Strikers (1977–1983) =

American football team (1977–1983)

- Full name: Fort Lauderdale Strikers
- Founded: 1977 (Previously Miami Toros)
- Dissolved: 1983 (rebranded as Minnesota Strikers)
- Stadium: Lockhart Stadium; Fort Lauderdale, Florida West Palm Beach Auditorium (indoor 1979–80); West Palm Beach, Florida Hollywood Sportatorium (indoor 1980–81); Pembroke Pines, Florida
- Capacity: 20,450/15,532 (indoor)
- Owner: Elizabeth Robbie
- League: North American Soccer League
Home colors	Away colors

The Fort Lauderdale Strikers were a professional soccer team based in the Miami metropolitan area. They competed in the North American Soccer League (NASL) from 1977 to 1983. They played their home matches at Lockhart Stadium.

Founded in 1967 as the Washington Darts, the team relocated to Florida in 1972. They were known as the Miami Gatos (1972) and the Miami Toros (1973–1976) before moving to nearby Fort Lauderdale. In addition to their time in the NASL outdoor league, the Strikers also played two indoor seasons while in Fort Lauderdale, at the West Palm Beach Auditorium for the 1979–80 season and the Hollywood Sportatorium for the 1980–81 season. After the 1983 season, the Strikers moved to Minneapolis and became the Minnesota Strikers. Among their players during its time in Fort Lauderdale were football legends George Best and Gerd Müller.

== History ==
=== Origins ===
Founded in 1963 as the amateur club Washington Britannica and eventually rebranding as the Washington Darts, the team joined the North American Soccer League in 1970 after playing three seasons in the American Soccer League and winning two consecutive ASL championships. After the 1970 season, the team was sold to John Bilotta, former part owner of the Rochester Lancers, and Arthur Bant, a hotel owner, who relocated and rebranded as the team as the Miami Gatos. After one season, the team was sold to a group of 25 local business leaders including Miami Dolphins owner Joe Robbie and his wife Elizabeth and renamed the Toros. In December 1976 and after five seasons in Miami, the team announced it was moving to Fort Lauderdale. The team played its first game, an indoor friendly, on February 27, 1977, against the Tampa Bay Rowdies, the first meeting in what was to become one of the most enduring rivalries in North American soccer, the Fort Lauderdale–Tampa Bay rivalry.

=== Early success ===
The Strikers won their debut match 2–1 at Lockhart Stadium against the St. Louis Stars on April 9, 1977. They finished the 1977 season in first place of the Eastern Division American Conference with a record of nineteen wins and seven losses, tying the league record for most wins in a season. The team drew an average 8,148 fans for the season, a 165% increase over the team's last season as the Toros, and head coach Ron Newman, who had been hired before the team announced its move to Fort Lauderdale, was named NASL coach of the year. In the first match of the Division Championship, the Strikers lost to the Pelé led New York Cosmos 8–3 at Giants Stadium in a match which drew 77,691 fans, a record for a non-exhibition domestic league soccer game. In the return leg played in Fort Lauderdale, the Strikers lost 3–2 in an overtime shootout. Finishing the 1978 season in third place with a record of sixteen wins and fourteen losses, the Strikers made it to the third round of the playoffs, losing the Conference Championship to the Tampa Bay Rowdies. The team was one of four to participate in the 1979 NASL Budweiser Indoor Soccer Invitational, losing both games the played The 1979 North American Soccer League season ended with the Strikers in second place of the Eastern Division behind the Rowdies with a record of seventeen wins, thirteen losses and averaging 13,774 attendance per game. The Strikers were knocked out of the first round of the playoffs by the Chicago Sting, losing both games without scoring a goal. The day before the second game, it was announced that the team had relieved Ron Newman as head coach and offered him a job in the team management.

=== Post Newman era ===
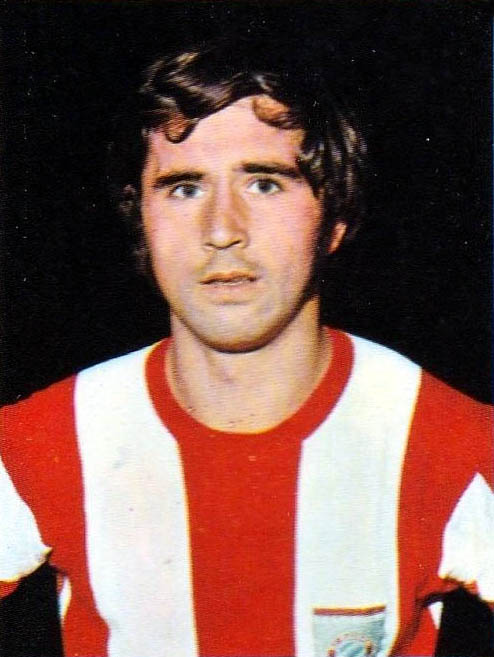
German Gerd Müller (left) and Peruvian Teófilo Cubillas played for the Strikers from 1979 to 1981

After Newman declined the front office position, the Strikers hired Bob Lemieux who had been working as an executive for the Detroit Red Wings as the team's General Manager. In December 1979, the Strikers announced that Cor van der Hart had been hired as head coach. During the 1980 NASL Season there were several reports of arguments between van der Hart and the players as well as publicity referencing a drinking problem, both issues led to difficulties with the head office. Finishing with a record of eighteen wins and fourteen loses, the team ended the season in second place of the Eastern Division, behind the Tampa Bay Rowdies again.

The Strikers advanced to Soccer Bowl '80 against the New York Cosmos after defeating the California Surf, Edmonton Drillers, and San Diego Sockers in the first three rounds of the playoffs. On September 21, 1980, at RFK Stadium in Washington, DC the Strikers lost to the Cosmos 3–0. In mid October, Lemieux was fired from his position as General Manager with Tim Robbie, son of owners Joe and Elizabeth Robbie, taking over the position. Then in late December 1980 with the team 0–6 in the 1980–81 NASL Indoor season and after having announced just after the Soccer Bowl that he would return as head coach for the following outdoor season, van der Hart was fired. Team spokesman stated "personal issues" and "team morale" as the primary reason and that Assistant Bill Nuttall was named caretaker for the remainder of the indoor campaign. German Eckhard Krautzun who had coached the Houston Hurricane during the 1980 season, was named head coach for the 1981 Outdoor season. The 1981 season saw the team's first decline in average attendance since it had moved to Fort Lauderdale with 13,345 fans per game seeing them finish second in the Southern Division with a record of eighteen wins and fourteen losses, rather than the 14,360 who attended each game during the 1980 season. After defeating the Calgary Boomers and Minnesota Kicks in the first two rounds of the playoffs, the Strikers lost in the Semifinals to the Cosmos. The day after the Strikers were eliminated from contention for Soccer Bowl '81, the North American Soccer League announced that the team would not participate in the upcoming 1981–82 NASL Indoor season, but would return for 1982 outdoor season.

=== Decline ===
The Strikers ended the 1982 North American Soccer League season with an identical eighteen wins and fourteen losses from the previous season which won them the Southern Division title with another decline in attendance of 12,345 average attendance. After defeating the Montreal Manic in the first round of the playoffs, the Strikers failed to qualify for Soccer Bowl '82 when they lost the semifinals to Seattle Sounders. After two seasons, Krautzun was fired as head coach with former Striker player and head coach of the recently folded Georgia Generals David Chadwick rumored to be interested in the position. His hiring was confirmed a week later. In addition to compiling a record of one win and seven losses in the 1983 NASL Grand Prix of Indoor Soccer, the Strikers played two indoor friendlies during the offseason. The team's attendance continued decline in the 1983 outdoor season and the team recorded their first losing record in an outdoor NASL season with fourteen wins and sixteen losses. Finishing second in the Southern Division, the team was eliminated in the first round of the playoffs by the Tulsa Roughnecks.

=== Relocation ===
Following the conclusion of the 1983 outdoor season season long rumors that the team was looking to move were confirmed when General Manager Tim Robbie met with officials in Minneapolis On November 30, 1983, team owner Elizabeth Robbie, Minnesota Governor Rudy Perpich, and NASL president Howard Samuels officially announced the team was moving and indicated the team had lost around $1 million in the last year. In 1984 the team began play as the Minnesota Strikers. The team survived the NASL folding after the 1984 season and competed in the Major Indoor Soccer League for an additional four seasons before going out of business.

== Year-by-year ==
Year	Record	Regular season finish	Playoffs	Avg. Attend.
1977	19–7	1st, Eastern Division, American Conference	Divisional Playoff	8,148
1978	16–14	3rd, Eastern Division, American Conference	American Conference Finals	10,479
1979 indoor	0–2	4th, Budweiser Invitational	n/a	
1979	17–13	2nd, Eastern Division, American Conference	American Conference Quarterfinals	13,774
1979–80 indoor	3–9	4th, Eastern Division	n/a	2,069
1980	18–14	2nd, Eastern Division, American Conference	Runners-up	14,360
1980–81 indoor	1–17	4th, Eastern Division	n/a	1,699
1981	18–14	2nd, Southern Division	Semifinals	13,345
1982	18–14	1st, Southern Division	Semifinals	12,345
1983 indoor	2–8	4th, Indoor Grand Prix	n/a	
1983	14–16	2nd, Southern Division	Quarterfinals	10,823

== Honors ==
NASL championships
- 1980 runner-up

Regular Season Titles

- 1977 (19–7 • 161 points)

Division titles

- 1977 Eastern Division, Atlantic Conference
- 1982 Southern Division

Coach of the Year

- 1977 Ron Newman

U.S. Soccer Hall of Fame

- 1992 Ron Newman
- 2003 Arnie Mausser, Joe & Elizabeth Robbie

Canadian Soccer Hall of Fame

- 2002 Branko Šegota
- 2004 Bob Bolitho

Indoor Soccer Hall of Fame

- 2012 Ron Newman, Branko Šegota
- 2014 Bruce Savage

All-Star first team selections

- 1977 (England) Gordon Banks
- 1980 (Peru) Teófilo Cubillas
- 1981 (Peru) Teófilo Cubillas, (Netherlands) Jan van Beveren
- 1983 (Netherlands) Jan van Beveren

All-Star second team selections

- 1978 (England) Ray Hudson
- 1979 (Peru) Teófilo Cubillas, (West Germany) Gerd Müller
- 1982 (Peru) Teófilo Cubillas, (Netherlands) Jan van Beveren

All-Star honorable mentions

- 1978 (Northern Ireland) George Best, (England) Maurice Whittle
- 1980 (England) Ray Hudson, (Netherlands) Jan van Beveren
- 1982 (England) Ray Hudson, (Canada) Branko Šegota
- 1983 (England) Ray Hudson, (Canada) Bruce Miller

== Head coaches ==
- (England) Ron Newman (1977–1979)
- (Netherlands) Cor van der Hart (1980)
- (Germany) Eckhard Krautzun (1981–1982)
- (England) David Chadwick (1983–1984)

== See also ==
- Fort Lauderdale Strikers (2006–2016), competing in the NASL
- Fort Lauderdale Strikers (1994–1997)
- Fort Lauderdale Strikers (1988–1994)
- Fort Lauderdale Sun, Division 2 team of the short-lived USL (1984–85)
- Miami Fusion, now defunct MLS team (1997–2001)
- Miami Toros
- Minnesota Strikers
- Fort Lauderdale–Tampa Bay rivalry
