= Georgia Generals =

Georgia Generals were a professional soccer team in the United States. They played for one season (1982) in the ASL. They were formed when the Cleveland Cobras franchise moved to Atlanta, Georgia. Their owner was Walt Russell. They played their games at DeKalb Memorial Stadium in Clarkston.

== 1982 Coach ==
- (England) David Chadwick
