= 1979 Portland Timbers season =

Portland Timbers
1979 season
- Owner: Oregon Soccer, Inc.
- Head coach: (England) Don Megson
- Stadium: Civic Stadium
- NASL: Division: 4th Playoffs: Did not qualify
- U.S. Open Cup: Did not enter
- Top goalscorer: (Scotland) John Bain (Bermuda) Clyde Best (8 goals)
- Highest home attendance: 18,254 vs. NYC (May 26)
- Lowest home attendance: 6,244 vs. MIN (Apr 14)
- Average home league attendance: 11,172

The 1979 Portland Timbers season was the fifth season for the Portland Timbers in the now-defunct North American Soccer League.

== Squad ==
=== Roster players ===
The 1979 squad

Note: Flags indicate national team as defined under FIFA eligibility rules; some limited exceptions apply. Players may hold more than one non-FIFA nationality.

| No. | Pos. | Nation | Player |
|---|---|---|---|
| 00 | GK | ENG | Mick Poole |
| 2 | FW | ENG | David Butler |
| 3 | DF | ENG | Clive Charles |
| 4 | DF | USA | Kelvin Norman |
| 5 | DF | ENG | Graham Day |
| 6 | MF | SCO | John Bain |
| 7 | FW | SCO | Stewart Scullion |
| 8 | MF | IRL | Jimmy Conway |
| 9 | DF | USA | Paul Toomey |
| 10 | FW | BER | Clyde Best |
| 11 | FW | BRB | Elson Seale |

| No. | Pos. | Nation | Player |
|---|---|---|---|
| 12 | FW | ENG | Willie Anderson |
| 13 | DF | CAN | Peter Stanley |
| 14 | DF | CAN | Bruce Gant |
| 15 | DF | ENG | Alan Thompson |
| 16 | MF | CAN | Brian Gant |
| 17 | FW | USA | Mike Flater |
| 18 | MF | MEX | Ignacio Baez |
| 18 | FW | CAN | Dale Mitchell |
| 20 | DF | CAN | Garry Ayre |
| 22 | GK | USA | Jim Gorsek |

=== Replacement players ===
This list shows players used during the brief player strike on April 14, 1979.

Note: Flags indicate national team as defined under FIFA eligibility rules; some limited exceptions apply. Players may hold more than one non-FIFA nationality.

| No. | Pos. | Nation | Player |
|---|---|---|---|
| 2 | FW | USA | Terry White |
| 6 | FW | ENG | Chris Hopper |
| 19 | FW | USA | Scott Meiggs |
| 26 | DF | USA | Ed Schott |
| — | DF | USA | Brian Baker |
| — | MF | USA | Mike Davis |

| No. | Pos. | Nation | Player |
|---|---|---|---|
| — | DF | USA | Grant Herreid |
| — | MF | USA | Dell Herreid |
| — | DF | USA | Lars McNaughton |
| — | MF | USA | Tony Rodrigues |
| — | MF | USA | Alan Schaufler |
| — | DF | USA | Sharp |

== North American Soccer League ==
=== National Conference, Western Division standings ===
| Pos | Club | Pld | W | L | GF | GA | GD | Pts |
|---|---|---|---|---|---|---|---|---|
| 1 | Vancouver Whitecaps | 30 | 20 | 10 | 54 | 34 | +20 | 172 |
| 2 | Los Angeles Aztecs | 30 | 18 | 12 | 62 | 47 | +15 | 162 |
| 3 | Seattle Sounders | 30 | 13 | 17 | 58 | 52 | +6 | 125 |
| 4 | Portland Timbers | 30 | 11 | 19 | 50 | 75 | −25 | 122 |

Pld = Matches played; W = Matches won; L = Matches lost; GF = Goals for; GA = Goals against; GD = Goal difference; Pts = Points

=== League results ===
| Date | Opponent | Venue | Result | Attendance | Scorers |
|---|---|---|---|---|---|
| March 31, 1979 | San Jose Earthquakes | A | 4–3 | 17,111 | Conway, Bri. Gant (2), Seale |
| April 8, 1979 | San Diego Sockers | H | 2–3* (OT) | 12,017 | Scullion, Best |
| April 14, 1979 | Minnesota Kicks | H | 0–2 | 6,244 | |
| April 21, 1979 | Vancouver Whitecaps | A | 1–2 | 23,137 | Bain |
| April 29, 1979 | Edmonton Drillers | H | 3–2 | 10,327 | Day, Best (2) |
| May 5, 1979 | Tulsa Roughnecks | H | 4*–3 (OT) | 9,159 | Conway, Best, Thompson |
| May 13, 1979 | Houston Hurricane | A | 1–2 (OT) | 3,957 | Best |
| May 19, 1979 | California Surf | H | 1–0 | 10,191 | Bain |
| May 26, 1979 | New York Cosmos | H | 1–2* (OT) | 18,254 | Bain |
| May 28, 1979 | Minnesota Kicks | A | 1–2 | 23,211 | Bri. Gant |
| June 2, 1979 | Los Angeles Aztecs | A | 1–5 | 16,741 | Best |
| June 6, 1979 | Chicago Sting | H | 1–5 | 7,621 | Scullion |
| June 9, 1979 | Seattle Sounders | H | 2–1 | 12,175 | Best, Butler |
| June 13, 1979 | Edmonton Drillers | A | 2–1 | 6,280 | Bain, Butler |
| June 15, 1979 | Toronto Blizzard | H | 3*–2 (OT) | 10,417 | Best, Butler |
| June 20, 1979 | San Jose Earthquakes | H | 1–2 | 9,711 | Conway |
| June 22, 1979 | Rochester Lancers | A | 1–2* (OT) | 5,822 | Conway |
| June 27, 1979 | New York Cosmos | A | 1–3 | 33,271 | Bri. Gant |
| June 30, 1979 | Seattle Sounders | A | 1–5 | 34,012 | Butler |
| July 4, 1979 | Washington Diplomats | H | 0–1 | 17,613 | |
| July 8, 1979 | Atlanta Chiefs | H | 0–3 | 7,664 | |
| July 11, 1979 | Tulsa Roughnecks | A | 1–0 | 14,378 | Bri. Gant |
| July 14, 1979 | Dallas Tornado | A | 4–3 (OT) | 8,744 | Bri. Gant, Seale, Thompson, Butler |
| July 18, 1979 | California Surf | A | 1–2 (OT) | 9,911 | Mitchell |
| July 21, 1979 | Ft. Lauderdale Strikers | H | 4–1 | 11,097 | Day, Bain (2), Mitchell |
| July 28, 1979 | Vancouver Whitecaps | H | 2–3 (OT) | 12,727 | Mitchell (2) |
| August 1, 1979 | Toronto Blizzard | A | 3*–2 (OT) | 11,868 | Bain, Mitchell |
| August 4, 1979 | Philadelphia Fury | A | 0–5 | 5,934 | |
| August 8, 1979 | San Diego Sockers | A | 3–5 | 11,032 | Bain, Thompson, Butler |
| August 12, 1979 | Los Angeles Aztecs | H | 1–3 | 12,367 | Day |

* = Shootout win
