= 1978 North American Soccer League playoffs =

1978 North American Soccer League Playoffs
Tournament details
- Country: United States; Canada
- Teams: 16

Final positions
- Champions: Cosmos
- Runners-up: Tampa Bay Rowdies

Tournament statistics
- Matches played: 21
- Goals scored: 81 (3.86 per match)
- Top goal scorer(s): (England) Alan Willey (7 goals)

The 1978 North American Soccer League playoffs began on August 8 and ended on August 27 with Soccer Bowl '78 at Giants Stadium in East Rutherford, New Jersey. 16 out of 24 teams qualified after a 30-match regular season, eight from each conference.

== Playoff format ==
The top two teams in each division would quality for the playoffs. The other spots would go to the next best two teams in the conference, regardless of division. The top three seeds went to the division winners, seeds 4-6 went to the second place teams and the last two seeds were known as 'wild-cards', a nod to the NFL's playoff format. The winners of each successive round would be reseeded within the conference by point total. The first round and the Soccer Bowl were single games, while the conference semifinals and championships were two-game series. As in the 1977 playoffs, if both teams were tied at one win apiece at the conclusion of Game 2, there would be a 30-minute sudden-death mini-game and a shootout if necessary.

== Playoff seeds ==
=== American Conference ===
1. Detroit Express – Central Division champions, 176 points
2. New England Tea Men – Eastern Division champions, 165 points
3. San Diego Sockers – Western Division champions, 164 points
4. Tampa Bay Rowdies – 165 points
5. Chicago Sting – 123 points
6. California Surf – 115 points
7. Fort Lauderdale Strikers – 143 points
8. Philadelphia Fury – 111 points

=== National Conference ===
1. Cosmos – Eastern Division champions, 212 points
2. Vancouver Whitecaps – Western Division champions, 199 points
3. Minnesota Kicks – Central Division champions, 156 points
4. Portland Timbers – 167 points
5. Washington Diplomats – 145 points
6. Tulsa Roughnecks – 132 points
7. Toronto Metros-Croatia – 144 points
8. Seattle Sounders – 138 points

== Bracket ==
Conference Quarterfinals	Conference Semifinals
A1	Detroit Express	1
A8	Philadelphia Fury	0
A1	Detroit Express	1
A7	Fort Lauderdale Strikers	2
A2	New England Tea Men	1
A7	Fort Lauderdale Strikers	3
American Conference
A3	San Diego Sockers	2
A6	California Surf	1
A3	San Diego Sockers	1
A4	Tampa Bay Rowdies	2
A4	Tampa Bay Rowdies	3
A5	Chicago Sting	1
N1	Cosmos	5
N8	Seattle Sounders	2
N1	Cosmos	2
N3	Minnesota Kicks	1
N3	Minnesota Kicks	3
N6	Tulsa Roughnecks	1
National Conference
N2	Vancouver Whitecaps	4
N7	Toronto Metros-Croatia	0
N2	Vancouver Whitecaps	0
N4	Portland Timbers	2
N4	Portland Timbers	2
N5	Washington Diplomats	1

Conference Championships
A7	Fort Lauderdale Strikers	1
A4	Tampa Bay Rowdies	2
N1	Cosmos	2
N4	Portland Timbers	0

Soccer Bowl '78
A4	Tampa Bay Rowdies	1
N1	Cosmos	3

== Conference Quarterfinals ==
=== American Conference ===
==== (1) Detroit Express vs. (8) Philadelphia Fury ====
August 8

Detroit Express	1–0	Philadelphia Fury
Francis (35:57)

Pontiac Silverdome, Pontiac
Attendance: 22,456

==== (2) New England Tea Men vs. (7) Fort Lauderdale Strikers ====
August 9

New England Tea Men	1–3	Fort Lauderdale Strikers
Ridley (24:46)		Irving; Simpson (68:02); Ronson (72:23)

Schaefer Stadium, Boston
Attendance: 18,672

==== (3) San Diego Sockers vs. (6) California Surf ====
August 8

San Diego Sockers	2–1	California Surf
McCall; McCall		Suhnholz (3:30)

San Diego Stadium, San Diego
Attendance: 6,238

==== (4) Tampa Bay Rowdies vs. (5) Chicago Sting ====
August 8

Tampa Bay Rowdies	3–1	Chicago Sting
Marsh (26:48); Marsh; Wegerle (74:08)	Report	Granitza (78:06)

Tampa Stadium, Tampa
Attendance: 26,596
Referee: George Courtney (England)

=== National Conference ===
==== (1) Cosmos vs. (8) Seattle Sounders ====
August 9

Cosmos	5–2	Seattle Sounders
Bogićević (39:32); Bogićević; Beckenbauer (58:13); Dimitrijević (58:34); Hunt		England (56:31); Wallace (74:58)

Giants Stadium, East Rutherford
Attendance: 47,780

==== (2) Vancouver Whitecaps vs. (7) Toronto Metros-Croatia ====
August 9

Vancouver Whitecaps	4–0	Toronto Metros-Croatia
Campbell (16:04); Hinton; Campbell; B. Lenarduzzi

Empire Stadium, Vancouver
Attendance: 30,811
Referee: Gino D'Ippolito (USA)

==== (3) Minnesota Kicks vs. (6) Tulsa Roughnecks ====
August 10

Minnesota Kicks	3–1	Tulsa Roughnecks
Futcher; Willey; Willey (82:11)		Caskey (48:21)

Metropolitan Stadium, Minneapolis
Attendance: 36,478
Referee: John Davies (England)

==== (4) Portland Timbers vs. (5) Washington Diplomats ====
August 9

Portland Timbers	2–1(OT)	Washington Diplomats
McNeill (58:57); Bain 96:41' (Seale)		Stokes (89:30)

Civic Stadium, Portland
Attendance: 14,030

== Conference semifinals ==
=== American Conference ===
==== (1) Detroit Express vs. (7) Ft. Lauderdale Strikers ====
August 13
Game 1

Fort Lauderdale Strikers	4–3(SO)	Detroit Express
Irving (59:10); Whittle (65:41); Irving		Francis (3:27); Francis (41:55); Tinnion (67:11)
Penalties
Whelan (penalty scored); Fowles (penalty scored); Hudson (penalty missed); Irving (penalty missed); Whittle (penalty scored)	3–2	(penalty missed) Francis; (penalty missed) Furphy; (penalty scored) Bradford; (penalty missed) Tinnion; (penalty scored) Davies

Lockhart Stadium, Fort Lauderdale
Attendance: 11,517
Referee: Gino D'Ippolito (USA)
August 16

Detroit Express	1–0	Fort Lauderdale Strikers
Brazil (42:34)

Pontiac Silverdome, Pontiac
Attendance: 32,819
Mini-game

Detroit Express	0–1	Fort Lauderdale Strikers
		Nanchoff 20:36' (Hudson)

Fort Lauderdale wins series 2–1

==== (3) San Diego Sockers vs. (4) Tampa Bay Rowdies ====
August 14
Game 1

San Diego Sockers	0–1	Tampa Bay Rowdies
	Report	Auguste (60:31)

San Diego Stadium, San Diego
Attendance: 8,014
August 17
Game 2

Tampa Bay Rowdies	1–2	San Diego Sockers
Anderson	Report	Harsanyi (48:25); McCall (67:49)

Tampa Stadium, Tampa
Attendance: 32,495
Referee: Tony Nobile
Mini-game

Tampa Bay Rowdies	1–0	San Diego Sockers
Marsh 3:41' (Auguste)	Report

Tampa Bay wins series 2–1

=== National Conference ===
==== (1) Cosmos vs. (3) Minnesota Kicks ====
August 14
Game 1

Minnesota Kicks	9–2	Cosmos
George; Roth (18:32); Willey; Ntsoelengoe (53:14); Willey (63:28); Willey; Willey; Willey; Hamilton (89:06)		Chinaglia (48:19); Etherington

Metropolitan Stadium, Minneapolis
Attendance: 45,863
August 16
Game 2

Cosmos	4–0	Minnesota Kicks
Chinaglia; Tueart (12:23); Chinaglia; Tueart (50:56)

Giants Stadium, East Rutherford
Attendance: 60,199
Mini-game

Cosmos	1–0(SO)	Minnesota Kicks
Penalties
Bogićević (penalty missed); Tueart (penalty missed); Hunt (penalty missed); Morais (penalty missed); Alberto (penalty scored); Beckenbauer (penalty scored)	2–1	(penalty scored) Hamilton; (penalty missed) Futcher; (penalty missed) George; (penalty missed) Ntsoelengoe; (penalty missed) Villa; (penalty missed) Merrick

New York wins series 2–1

==== (2) Vancouver Whitecaps vs. (4) Portland Timbers ====
August 12
Game 1

Portland Timbers	1–0	Vancouver Whitecaps
Best (54:53)

Civic Stadium, Portland
Attendance: 16,437
August 16
Game 2

Vancouver Whitecaps	1–2	Portland Timbers
Kember (47:11)		Best (21:19); Anderson

Empire Stadium, Vancouver
Attendance: 32,666

Portland wins series 2–0

== Conference finals ==
=== American Conference ===
==== (4) Tampa Bay Rowdies vs. (7) Ft. Lauderdale Strikers ====
August 20
Game 1

Fort Lauderdale Strikers	3–2	Tampa Bay Rowdies
Whittle (45:44); Irving (46:25); Best (50:41)	Report	Robb (30:31); McLeod (89:45)

Lockhart Stadium, Fort Lauderdale
Attendance: 16,286
August 23
Game 2

Tampa Bay Rowdies	3–1	Fort Lauderdale Strikers
Anderson; Robb; Wegerle (83:36)	Report	Irving (88:34)

Tampa Stadium, Tampa
Attendance: 37,360
Referee: John Davies
Mini-game

Tampa Bay Rowdies	1–0 (SO)	Fort Lauderdale Strikers
	Report
Penalties
Anderson (penalty missed); Wegerle (penalty scored); Paddon (penalty missed); Robb (penalty missed); Marsh (penalty scored)	2–1	(penalty missed) Whelan; (penalty missed) Irving; (penalty missed) Hudson; (penalty scored) Fowles; (penalty missed) Whittle

Referee: John Davies

Tampa Bay wins series 2–1

=== National Conference ===
==== (1) Cosmos vs. (4) Portland Timbers ====
August 18
Game 1

Portland Timbers	0–1	New York Cosmos
		Tueart (46:03)

Civic Stadium, Portland
Attendance: 24,515
August 23
Game 2

Cosmos	5–0	Portland Timbers
Chinaglia (32:07); Tueart (76:06); Hunt (77:28); Beckenbauer (80:44); Seninho

Giants Stadium, East Rutherford
Attendance: 57,128

New York wins series 2–0

=== Soccer Bowl '78 ===
August 27
4 pm

Cosmos	3–1	Tampa Bay Rowdies
Tueart; Chinaglia ( 44:38); Tueart	Report	Mirandinha (73:34)

Giants Stadium, East Rutherford, New Jersey
Attendance: 74,901
Referee: Jim Highet (Canada)

1978 NASL Champions: Cosmos

== Playoff Statistics ==
Mini-games are not counted as games played when compiling individual statistics. They are included in the minutes played category.

=== Scoring ===
GP = Games Played, G = Goals (worth 2 points), A = Assists (worth 1 point), Pts = Points

Player	Team	GP	G	A	Pts
Dennis Tueart	Cosmos	6	6	5	17
Alan Willey	Minnesota Kicks	3	7	0	14
Giorgio Chinaglia	Cosmos	6	5	2	12
David Irving	Fort Lauderdale Strikers	5	5	0	10
Rodney Marsh	Tampa Bay Rowdies	5	3	3	9

=== Goalkeeping ===
Note: GP = Games played; Min – Minutes played; GA = Goals against; GAA = Goals against average; W = Wins; L = Losses; SO = Shutouts

Player	Team	GP	Min	GA	GAA	W	L	SO
Phil Parkes	Vancouver Whitecaps	3	270	3	1.00	1	2	1
Alan Mayer	San Diego Sockers	3	225	3	1.00	1	1	0
Steve Hardwick	Detroit Express	3	306	4	1.33	2	1	2
Mick Poole	Portland Timbers	5	457	8	1.60	3	2	1
Winston DuBose	Tampa Bay Rowdies	6	574	10	1.67	3	3	1
