= 1978 Portland Timbers season =

Portland Timbers
1978 season
- Owner: Oregon Soccer, Inc.
- Head coach: (England) Don Megson
- Stadium: Civic Stadium
- NASL: Division: 2nd Playoffs: National Conference final
- U.S. Open Cup: Did not enter
- Top goalscorer: League: (Bermuda) Clyde Best (12 goals); All: (Bermuda) Clyde Best (14 goals)
- Highest home attendance: League: 23,536 vs. VAN (Jul 21); All: 24,515 vs. NYC (Aug 18)
- Lowest home attendance: 6,495 vs. COL (Apr 19)
- Average home league attendance: League: 11,803; All: 12,902

The 1978 Portland Timbers season was the fourth season for the Portland Timbers in the now-defunct North American Soccer League.

== Squad ==
The 1978 squad

Note: Flags indicate national team as defined under FIFA eligibility rules; some limited exceptions apply. Players may hold more than one non-FIFA nationality.

No.	Pos.	Nation	Player
00	GK	ENG	Mick Poole
1	GK	USA	Dave Givens
2	DF	SCO	Brian McNeill
3	DF	ENG	Clive Charles
4	DF	ENG	Mick Hoban
4	DF	USA	Kelvin Norman
5	DF	ENG	Graham Day
6	MF	SCO	John Bain
7	FW	SCO	Stewart Scullion
8	MF	IRL	Jimmy Conway
9	FW	BER	Clyde Best

No.	Pos.	Nation	Player
10	FW	CAN	Ike MacKay
11	FW	BRB	Elson Seale
12	FW	ENG	Willie Anderson
13	DF	CAN	Peter Stanley
14	DF	ENG	Pat Howard
14	FW	USA	Archie Roboostoff
16	MF	CAN	Brian Gant
17	FW	USA	Mike Flater
18	MF	MEX	Ignacio Baez
22	GK	USA	Jim Gorsek

== North American Soccer League ==
=== Preseason ===
Date	Opponent	Venue	Result	Attendance	Scorers
March 12, 1978	San Jose Earthquakes	A	0–1		
March 19, 1978	Colorado Caribous	H	2–0	7,877	Scullion, Roboostoff
March 25, 1978	Vancouver Whitecaps	A	1–2		Bain

=== Regular season ===
==== National Conference, Western Division standings ====
Pos	Club	Pld	W	L	GF	GA	GD	Pts
1	Vancouver Whitecaps	30	24	6	68	29	+39	199
2	Portland Timbers	30	20	10	50	36	+14	167
3	Seattle Sounders	30	15	15	50	45	+5	138
4	Los Angeles Aztecs	30	9	21	36	69	−33	88

Pld = Matches played; W = Matches won; L = Matches lost; GF = Goals for; GA = Goals against; GD = Goal difference; Pts = Points

==== League results ====
Date	Opponent	Venue	Result	Attendance	Scorers
March 31, 1978	California Surf	A	0–1	15,206	
April 8, 1978	Oakland Stompers	H	1–0	10,554	Roboostoff
April 15, 1978	San Diego Sockers	H	2–3	8,355	Best (2)
April 19, 1978	Colorado Caribous	H	2–1	6,495	Scullion (2)
April 22, 1978	Rochester Lancers	H	3–2 (OT)	8,667	Bain, Scullion, Anderson
April 29, 1978	San Diego Sockers	A	3–5	3,830	Gant, Best, Scullion
May 3, 1978	California Surf	H	2*–1 (OT)	8,328	Seale
May 7, 1978	Vancouver Whitecaps	A	0–1	13,155	
May 10, 1978	Detroit Express	A	1–0	6,729	Howard
May 13, 1978	Memphis Rogues	H	1–0	6,955	Flater
May 17, 1978	New York Cosmos	H	2*–1 (OT)	12,484	Best
May 20, 1978	San Jose Earthquakes	A	3–2	13,856	Bain, Best, Flater
May 24, 1978	Washington Diplomats	H	2*–1 (OT)	10,558	Bain
May 29, 1978	Los Angeles Aztecs	A	4–1	5,206	Seale, Best, Scullion, Flater
June 7, 1978	Los Angeles Aztecs	H	1–0	9,054	Conway
June 10, 1978	Seattle Sounders	H	1*–0 (OT)	15,526	
June 16, 1978	New England Tea Men	H	2*–1 (OT)	14,615	Scullion
June 21, 1978	Tampa Bay Rowdies	A	0–2	13,777	
June 24, 1978	Washington Diplomats	A	1–2	10,816	Best
June 28, 1978	Rochester Lancers	A	1–0	5,025	McNeill
June 30, 1978	Minnesota Kicks	H	1–0	14,125	Best
July 4, 1978	Oakland Stompers	A	1–0	15,890	Flater
July 7, 1978	San Jose Earthquakes	H	5–1	15,827	Best, Scullion, Anderson, Flater (2)
July 13, 1978	Tulsa Roughnecks	A	0–1	9,620	
July 15, 1978	Dallas Tornado	A	3–1	6,388	Seale, Best, Flater
July 19, 1978	Toronto Metros-Croatia	A	1–3	6,490	Best
July 21, 1978	Vancouver Whitecaps	H	0–2	23,536	
July 25, 1978	Dallas Tornado	H	2–1	11,971	Gant, Anderson
July 31, 1978	Seattle Sounders	A	2–3 (OT)	22,042	Gant, Best
August 2, 1978	Colorado Caribous	A	3–1	8,638	Bain (3)

* = Shootout win

=== Postseason ===
==== Playoff bracket ====
1st round
Portland Timbers (OT)	2
Washington Diplomats	1

Conference semifinals
1	Portland Timbers	1	2	—
8	Vancouver Whitecaps	0	1	—
4	Minnesota Kicks	9	0	0
5	New York Cosmos (MG)	2	4	1
2	Ft. Lauderdale Strikers (MG)	4*	0	1
7	Detroit Express	3	1	0
3	San Diego Sockers	0	2	0
6	Tampa Bay Rowdies (MG)	1	1	1

Conference finals
Portland Timbers	0	0	—
New York Cosmos	1	5	—
Ft. Lauderdale Strikers	3	1	0
Tampa Bay Rowdies (MG)	2	3	1

Soccer Bowl '78
New York Cosmos	3
Tampa Bay Rowdies	1

* = Shootout win; MG = Series decided by 30-minute mini-game (score of mini-game in 3rd column)

==== Playoff results ====
Date	Opponent	Venue	Result	Attendance	Scorers
August 9, 1978	Washington Diplomats	H	2–1 (OT)	14,230	Bain, McNeill
August 12, 1978	Vancouver Whitecaps	H	1–0	16,437	Best
August 16, 1978	Vancouver Whitecaps	A	2–1	32,266	Best, Anderson
August 18, 1978	New York Cosmos	H	0–1	24,515	
August 23, 1978	New York Cosmos	A	0–5	65,287	

== International friendlies ==
Date	Opponent	Venue	Result	Attendance	Scorers
May 27, 1978	Galasca (Guatemala)	H	5–0	6,715	Scullion (2), Gant, Flater (2)
June 1, 1978	Bristol City F.C.	H	0–1	8,038	
