= 1978 Fort Lauderdale Strikers season =

Fort Lauderdale Strikers
1978 season
- Owner: (United States) Elizabeth Robbie
- General manager: (United States) Beau Rodgers
- Manager: (England) Ron Newman
- Stadium: Lockhart Stadium
- NASL: American Conference: Finalist
- Top goalscorer: League: (England) David Irving (16 goals); All: (England) David Irving (23 goals)
- Average home league attendance: 10,479
Home colors	Away colors

The 1978 Fort Lauderdale Strikers season was the second season of the Fort Lauderdale Striker's team, and the club's twelfth season in professional soccer. This year the team were a finalist in the North American Soccer League American Conference.

== Competitions ==
=== Friendlies ===
Date	Opponent	Venue	Result	Attendance	Scorers
January 7, 1978	Washington Diplomats	D.C. Armory	9–2	2,384 (indoor)	Fearnley, Proctor
January 8, 1978	Washington Diplomats	D.C. Armory	8–5	2,163 (indoor)	Vaniger (2), Hamlyn, Aguirre, Nanchoff
February 6, 1978	(England) Stockport County F.C.	Edgeley Park	2–4		Irving, Whittle, Gemeri, Hughes
February 8, 1978	(England) Blackpool F.C.	Bloomfield Road	3–2		
February 10, 1978	(England) Workington A.F.C.	Borough Park	0–0	6,127	
February 13, 1978	(England) Portsmouth F.C.	Fratton Park	2–2		Irving (2)
February 15, 1978	(England) Port Vale F.C.	Vale Park	4–2	1,877	
February 18, 1978	(England) Swindon Town F.C.	County Ground	6–3	1,173	Irving (2), Fowles
February 26, 1978	FIU Sunblazers	FIU Soccer Stadium	4–2		Irving, Bodonczy
March 4, 1978	Tampa Bay Rowdies	Dade North Stadium	2–0	3,248	Irving, Fowles
March 8, 1978	Detroit Express	Bryant Stadium	2–3	350	Irving (2), Bodonczy
March 18, 1978	Minnesota Kicks	Lockhart Stadium	1–2	2,333	Vaniger
March 23, 1978	Washington Diplomats	Leonard High School	1–0	2,800	Irving
March 25, 1978	Philadelphia Fury	City Stadium	0–1 (SO)		shootout tiebreaker
May 10, 1978	(England) Blackpool F.C.	Lockhart Stadium	2–1	5,173	Gary Jones (2)
May 15, 1978	(England) Blackpool F.C.	Atlanta	0–2	9,658 (in Atlanta)	

=== NASL Playoffs ===
==== Conference Quarterfinals ====
August 9	New England Tea Men	1–3	Fort Lauderdale Strikers	Schaefer Stadium • 18,672

==== Conference semifinals ====
In 1978, if a playoff series was tied after two games, a 30 minute, golden goal, mini-game was played. If neither team scored in the mini-game, they would move on to a shoot-out to determine a series winner. *Teams were re-seeded for the Conference Semifinals based on regular season point totals. This affected only one of the four series; Tampa Bay versus San Diego.

Higher seed		Lower seed	Game 1	Game 2	Mini-game	(lower seed hosts Game 1)
Detroit Express	-	Fort Lauderdale Strikers	3–4 (SO, 2–3)	1–0	0–1	August 13 • Lockhart Stadium • 11,517; August 16 • Pontiac Silverdome • 32,219

==== Conference Championships ====
Higher seed		Lower seed	Game 1	Game 2	Mini-game	Attendance
Tampa Bay Rowdies	-	Fort Lauderdale Strikers	2–3	3–1	1–0 (SO, 2–1)	August 20 • Lockhart Stadium • 16,286; August 23 • Tampa Stadium • 37,249

==== Bracket ====
Conference Quarterfinals
A1	Detroit Express	1
A8	Philadelphia Fury	0
A2	New England Tea Men	1
A7	Fort Lauderdale Strikers	3
A3	San Diego Sockers	2
A6	California Surf	1
A4	Tampa Bay Rowdies	3
A5	Chicago Sting	1
N1	Cosmos	5
N8	Seattle Sounders	2
N3	Minnesota Kicks	3
N6	Tulsa Roughnecks	1
N2	Vancouver Whitecaps	4
N7	Toronto Metros-Croatia	0
N4	Portland Timbers	2
N5	Washington Diplomats	1

Conference Semifinals
A1	Detroit Express	1
A7	Fort Lauderdale Strikers	2
A3	San Diego Sockers	1
A4	Tampa Bay Rowdies	2
N1	Cosmos	2
N3	Minnesota Kicks	1
N2	Vancouver Whitecaps	0
N4	Portland Timbers	2

Conference Championships
A7	Fort Lauderdale Strikers	1
A4	Tampa Bay Rowdies	2
N1	Cosmos	2
N4	Portland Timbers	0

Soccer Bowl '78
A4	Tampa Bay Rowdies	1
N1	Cosmos	3

== See also ==
1978 Fort Lauderdale Strikers
