= American Conference (NASL) =

- League: North American Soccer League
- Sport: Soccer
- First season: 1978
- Folded: 1980
- Divisions: East; Central; West
- No. of teams: 12
- Most titles: Tampa Bay Rowdies (2 titles)

The American Soccer Conference was one of two conferences of the original North American Soccer League between 1978 and 1980. It along with the National Conference were formed for the 1978 season as part of a realignment to accommodate an expanding league, and bolster more competitive play which had been lacking under the previous Atlantic and Pacific conferences. It is speculated, that the league decided to realign the league to be more similar to the National Football League (American football) format, with one league official stating that the league hoped that new expansions and initiatives would cause "enough demand for soccer that they [could] sell the TV rights to two networks like the NFL did." During the three seasons using the American/National alignment, American Conference teams struggled to compete against their National Conference counterparts, with the American Conference champion failing to win the Soccer Bowl in every season.

== Teams ==
Following the realignment, the conference was initially made up of five teams from the Atlantic Conference, two teams from the Pacific Conference, and five teams making their NASL debut. After playing just one season, the Oakland Stompers were sold and relocated to Edmonton.

Team	Division	First season (Note: Season played in the American Conference. Teams may have played before and/or after the conference existed.)	Last season	Previous conference (division)
Fort Lauderdale Strikers	East	1978	1980	Atlantic (East)
New England Tea Men	East	1978	1980	1978 debut
Philadelphia Fury	East	1978	1980	1978 debut
Tampa Bay Rowdies	East	1978	1980	Atlantic (East)
Chicago Sting	Central	1978	1980	Atlantic (North)
Detroit Express	Central	1978	1980	1978 debut
Houston Hurricane	Central	1978	1980	1978 debut
Memphis Rogues	Central	1978	1980	1978 debut
California Surf	West	1978	1980	Atlantic (North) (Note: Relocated from St. Louis.)
Oakland Stompers	West	1978	1978	Atlantic (North) (Note: Relocated from Connecticut.)
San Diego Sockers	West	1978	1980	Pacific (South) (Note: Relocated from Las Vegas.)
San Jose Earthquakes	West	1978	1980	Pacific (West)
Edmonton Drillers	West	1979	1980	American (West) (Note: Relocated from Oakland.)

== Conference honors ==
=== American Conference championships ===
**Bold**	Won NASL Championship

Season	Champions	Series	Runners-up
1978	Tampa Bay Rowdies	2–1 (Note: Series tied 1–1, mini-game used as tiebreaker)	Fort Lauderdale Strikers
1979	Tampa Bay Rowdies	2–1	San Diego Sockers
1980	Fort Lauderdale Strikers	2–1	San Diego Sockers

=== Regular season titles ===
**Bold**	Most points in NASL

Year	Team	Division	Points (W–L)	Playoffs result
1978	Detroit Express	Central	176 (20–10)	Conference Semifinals
1978	Tampa Bay Rowdies	East	165 (18–12)	Lost Soccer Bowl
1978	San Diego Sockers	West	164 (18–12)	Conference Semifinals
1979	Houston Hurricane	Central	187 (22–8)	First Round
1979	Tampa Bay Rowdies	East	169 (19–11)	Lost Soccer Bowl
1979	San Diego Sockers	West	140 (15–15)	Lost Conference Final
1980	Chicago Sting	Central	187 (21–11)	First Round
1980	Tampa Bay Rowdies	East	168 (19–13)	Conference Semifinals
1980	Edmonton Drillers	West	149 (17–15)	Conference Semifinals

== See also ==
- American Football Conference
- American League (baseball)
- Eastern Conference (MLS)
- Western Conference (MLS)
