= 1979–80 NASL indoor season =

Indoor soccer league season

North American Soccer League 1979–80 indoor season
- Season: 1979–80
- Teams: 10
- Champions: Tampa Bay Rowdies (2nd title)
- Premiers: Atlanta Chiefs
- Matches: 60
- Goals: 665 (11.08 per match)
- Top goalscorer: (South Africa) David Byrne (23 goals)
- Average attendance: 4,869

The 1979–80 season was the North American Soccer League's first ever full indoor soccer season with playoffs. It began in November 1979, and the championship occurred in March 1980.

== Overview ==
Only 10 of the 24 NASL member-teams chose to field a squad for the 12 game regular season and 6 team, 3 round playoffs. The league decided to make several rule modifications from the NASL indoor tournaments and indoor friendlies of previous years. The most obvious change was the goal. No longer 4 by 16 feet (h x w), the goals now measured a more proportionate 6.5 by 12, with a board or plexiglass panel above the cross bar instead of netting. Rather than being divided into three 20-minute periods (like hockey) as was done previously, or the more recent three 15-minute periods, the game now featured four 15-minute quarters with an extended halftime (similar to American football) and short breaks and the end of the first and third quarters. These modifications were consistent with the rules of the competing Major Indoor Soccer League, which had begun operation in December 1978. Other changes included an extra referee at the bench to keep track of time penalties. Like most American sports, the clock would count down to 00:00 rather than up to "full time" as was done in association football. As before, (like ice hockey) there would be free substitutions, but players now had to touch the wall by their bench before a substitute player could come onto the playing floor. The floor dimensions remained, more or less 200 by 85 feet. Golden goal/sudden death overtime was used to settle games tied at the end of regulation. In the playoffs, 15-minute mini-games were used to decide series that were tied at one victory apiece. Indeed, two playoff series, including the Championship Final between Tampa Bay and Memphis, would need to be settled by means of a mini-game.

== Map of clubs ==
Eastern Division Western Division

== Regular season ==
W = Wins, L = Losses, GB = Games Behind 1st Place, % = Winning Percentage, GF = Goals For, GA = Goals Against, Avg Att = Average Home Attendance

Eastern Division	W	L	GB	%	GF	GA	Avg Att
Atlanta Chiefs	10	2	–	.833	70	46	5,069
Tampa Bay Rowdies	8	4	2	.667	75	64	5,910
Detroit Express	7	5	3	.583	70	69	3,937
Fort Lauderdale Strikers	3	9	7	.250	58	65	1,724
New England Tea Men	2	10	8	.167	52	81	3,249

Western Division	W	L	GB	%	GF	GA	Avg Att
Memphis Rogues	9	3	–	.750	65	44	8,249
Minnesota Kicks	8	4	1	.667	75	52	9,562
Tulsa Roughnecks	7	5	2	.583	63	64	4,657
California Surf	4	8	5	.333	71	83	3,181
Los Angeles Aztecs	2	10	8	.167	56	87	2,768

== Regular season statistics ==
=== Scoring leaders ===
GP = Games played, G = Goals (worth 2 points), A = Assists (worth 1 point), Pts = Points

Player	Team	GP	G	A	Pts
(South Africa) David Byrne	Atlanta	12	23	11	57
(England) Keith Furphy	Detroit	12	21	13	55
(England) Laurie Abrahams	California	12	18	17	53
(Socialist Federal Republic of Yugoslavia) Peter Baralić	Tampa Bay	12	21	10	52
(Iran) Iraj Danaifard	Tulsa	12	19	10	48
(England) Chris Dangerfield	Los Angeles	12	15	9	39
(England) Mark Lindsay	California	12	13	12	38
(Canada) Wes McLeod	Tampa Bay	12	13	12	38
(England) Steve Earle	Tulsa	12	10	18	38
(England) Alan Willey	Minnesota	12	15	6	36

=== Leading goalkeepers ===
Note: GP = Games played; Min = Minutes played; Svs = Saves; GA = Goals against; GAA = Goals against average; W = Wins

Player	Team	Min	Svs	GA	GAA	W
(United States) John Houska	Memphis	721	172	43	3.58	9
(United States) Victor Nogueira	Atlanta	637	164	39	3.67	10
(Canada) Tino Lettieri	Minnesota	658	165	41	3.74	8
(United States) Nick Owcharuk	Tulsa	441	134	33	4.49	7
(Canada) Željko Bilecki	Tampa Bay	684	173	54	4.74	8

== Playoffs ==
=== Bracket ===
First round Single game
E2	Tampa Bay Rowdies	12	x	x
E3	Detroit Express	1	x	x
W2	Minnesota Kicks	3	x	x
W3	Tulsa Roughnecks	2	x	x

Division finals Best-of-3
E1	Atlanta Chiefs	3	5	–
E2	Tampa Bay Rowdies	7	6(OT)	–
W1	Memphis Rogues	3	4(OT)	1
W2	Minnesota Kicks	6	3	0

Championship series Best-of-3
E2	Tampa Bay Rowdies	4	10	1
W1	Memphis Rogues	5	4	0

=== 1st round ===
February 19	Tampa Bay Rowdies	12–1	Detroit Express	Bayfront Center • 4,880

February 20	Minnesota Kicks	3–2	Tulsa Roughnecks	Met Center • 3,170

=== Division finals ===
If a playoff series is tied after two games, a 15 minute, tie breaker mini-game is played.

Higher seed		Lower seed	Game 1	Game 2	Mini-game	Attendance
Atlanta Chiefs	–	Tampa Bay Rowdies	3–7	5–6 (OT)	x	February 23 • Bayfront Center • 5,545; February 25 • The Omni • 6,141
Memphis Rogues	–	Minnesota Kicks	3–6	4–3 (OT)	1–0	February 23 • Met Center • 3,701; February 26 • Mid-South Coliseum • 7,130

=== Championship finals ===
Higher seed		Lower seed	Game 1	Game 2	Mini-game	Attendance
Memphis Rogues	–	Tampa Bay Rowdies	*5–4	4–10	0–1	*February 29 • Mid-South Coliseum • 9,081; March 2 • Bayfront Center • 5,545

*Memphis Rogues hosted Game 1 (instead of Game 2 and Mini-game) due to scheduling conflicts at the Mid-South Coliseum.

==== Championship match reports ====
February 29, 1980 Game 1	Memphis Rogues	5–4	Tampa Bay Rowdies	Memphis, Tennessee
7:30 P.M. (CST)	Cooke; Vazquez (18:19); Vazquez (44:26); Vazquez; Field	Report	Fabbiani (34:02); Wegerle (34:54); Fabbiani (54:44); Van der Beck (56:06)	Stadium: Mid-South Coliseum; Attendance: 9,081

March 2, 1980 Game 2	Tampa Bay Rowdies	10–4	Memphis Rogues	St. Petersburg, Florida
2:00 P.M. (EST)	Van der Beck (8:05); Wegerle (9:20); Connell (12:36); Van der Beck (13:16); Fabbiani (14:54); McLeod (38:00); Fabbiani (41:07); Anderson; Connell (50:54); Anderson (56:04)	Report	Carbognani (27:10); Field (45:53); Rosul (48:38); Rosul (49:50)	Stadium: Bayfront Center; Attendance: 5,545; Referee: John Davies (USA)

March 2, 1980 Mini-game	Tampa Bay Rowdies	1–0	Memphis Rogues	St. Petersburg, Florida
	Anderson (4:48)	Report		Stadium: Bayfront Center; Attendance: 5,545; Referee: John Davies (USA)

1979–80 NASL Indoor Champions: Tampa Bay Rowdies
