= 1978 North American Soccer League season =

Soccer league season

North American Soccer League
- Season: 1978
- Country: United States; Canada
- Champions: Cosmos (3rd title)
- Premiers: Cosmos (2nd title)
- Matches: 360
- Goals: 1,240 (3.44 per match)
- Top goalscorer: (Italy) Giorgio Chinaglia (34 goals)
- Biggest home win: DET 10–0 SJ (July 12)
- Biggest away win: LA 0–5 MIN (August 2)
- Highest scoring: DET 10–0 SJ (July 12); TOR 8–2 OAK (June 30)
- Longest winning run: 13, Vancouver (June 22 – August 6)
- Longest losing run: 13, San Jose (May 31 – July 19)
- Highest attendance: 71,219; Seattle at Cosmos (May 21)
- Lowest attendance: 1,538; N.E. at Chicago (May 7)
- Average attendance: 13,084

The 1978 North American Soccer League season was the 66th season of FIFA-sanctioned soccer, the 11th with a national first-division league, in the United States and Canada.

== Changes from the previous season ==
=== New teams ===
- Colorado Caribous
- Detroit Express
- Houston Hurricane
- Memphis Rogues
- New England Tea Men
- Philadelphia Fury

=== Teams folding ===
- None

=== Teams moving ===
- Connecticut Bicentennials to Oakland Stompers
- Las Vegas Quicksilver to San Diego Sockers
- St. Louis Stars to California Surf
- Team Hawaii to Tulsa Roughnecks

=== Name changes ===
- None

== Map of clubs ==
American East Division American Central Division American West Division
National East Division National Central Division National West Division

== Season recap ==
Bolstered by the success of the previous season, the league added six teams to reach 24 in total. The Colorado Caribous launched in Denver, the Detroit Express and Houston Hurricane became the second and third teams to play in fully enclosed indoor stadiums, the Philadelphia Fury brought soccer back to Philadelphia, the New England Tea Men would be the third attempt to have NASL soccer succeed in the Boston area and the Memphis Rogues would bring pro soccer to Tennessee.

There were also the usual franchise movements. Team Hawaii became the Tulsa Roughnecks, the Las Vegas Quicksilver became the San Diego Sockers, the Connecticut Bicentennials became the Oakland Stompers and the St. Louis Stars moved to Anaheim to become the California Surf.

With so many new clubs, the NASL realigned into a six-division format while expanding the playoffs to include 16 teams. The new alignment was a direct copy of the NFL's setup, as the new three-division conferences were called the 'American Soccer Conference' and the 'National Soccer Conference', respectively. Each conference had East, Central and West divisions as well.

The top two teams in each division would quality for the playoffs. The other spots would go to the next best two teams in the conference, regardless of division. The top three seeds went to the division winners, seeds 4-6 went to the second place teams and the last two seeds were known as 'wild-cards' – another nod to the NFL. The winners of each successive round would be reseeded within the conference. The first round and the Soccer Bowl were single games, while the conference semifinals and championships were two-game series. As in the 1977 playoffs, if both teams were tied at one win apiece at the conclusion of Game 2, there would be a 30-minute sudden-death mini-game and a shootout if necessary.

The Cosmos would set records for most wins and points in an NASL season, thanks to their 24-6 regular-season mark (shared with the Vancouver Whitecaps) and 212 points. The Cosmos beat the Ft. Lauderdale Strikers, 7–0, on opening day and never looked back, scoring 88 times while losing just three games in regulation. Giorgio Chinaglia scored 34 goals and 79 points, setting league records in the process. He did not win regular season MVP honors, however. That award went to New England's Mike Flanagan, who scored 30 goals and 68 points while leading the Tea Men to an unlikely ASC East title. At the age of 36, Alan Hinton of Vancouver set a league record of his own with 30 assists.

Still, the Cosmos needed a major rally to beat the Minnesota Kicks in the NSC playoffs. The Kicks won the first game by an extraordinary 9–2 score behind Alan Willey's five goals, but the Cosmos won Game 2, 4–0, back at Giants Stadium. The resulting mini-game went to a shootout, and Carlos Alberto and Franz Beckenbauer scored goals to keep the Cosmos alive. The Portland Timbers were shut out over both games of the National Conference final, and the Tampa Bay Rowdies were beaten before 74,901 fans at Giants Stadium in the Soccer Bowl. The Cosmos became the first back-to-back champions in NASL history.

After the season the Colorado Caribous would move to Atlanta, while the Oakland Stompers would move to Edmonton just two months before the start of the 1979 NASL season. The Stompers had drawn over 32,000 for their opening game at the Oakland Coliseum, but were drawing crowds under 10,000 by the end of the season. The Caribous had the worst record in the league and only drew one crowd bigger than 10,000 the entire year.

== Regular season ==
W = Wins, L = Losses, GF = Goals For, GA = Goals Against, BP = Bonus Points, Pts = Point System

6 points for a win, 0 points for a loss, 1 point for each regulation goal scored up to three per game.

-Premiers (most points). -Other playoff teams.

=== American Conference ===
Eastern Division	W	L	GF	GA	BP	Pts	Home	Road
New England Tea Men ^{(2)}	19	11	62	39	51	165	10-5	9-6
Tampa Bay Rowdies ^{(4)}	18	12	63	48	57	165	11-4	7-8
Fort Lauderdale Strikers ^{(7)}	16	14	50	59	47	143	12-3	4-11
Philadelphia Fury ^{(8)}	12	18	40	58	39	111	7-8	5-10

Central Division	W	L	GF	GA	BP	Pts	Home	Road
Detroit Express ^{(1)}	20	10	68	36	56	176	10-5	10-5
Chicago Sting ^{(5)}	12	18	57	64	51	123	7-8	5-10
Memphis Rogues	10	20	43	58	41	101	8-7	2-13
Houston Hurricane	10	20	37	61	36	96	5-10	5-10

Western Division	W	L	GF	GA	BP	Pts	Home	Road
San Diego Sockers ^{(3)}	18	12	63	56	56	164	12-3	6-9
California Surf ^{(6)}	13	17	43	49	37	115	9-6	4-11
Oakland Stompers	12	18	34	59	31	103	7-8	5-10
San Jose Earthquakes	8	22	36	81	35	83	4-11	4-11

=== National Conference ===
Eastern Division	W	L	GF	GA	BP	Pts	Home	Road
Cosmos ^{(1)}	24	6	88	39	68	212	14-1	10-5
Washington Diplomats ^{(5)}	16	14	55	47	49	145	11-4	5-10
Toronto Metros-Croatia ^{(7)}	16	14	58	47	48	144	9-6	7-8
Rochester Lancers	14	16	47	52	47	131	10-5	4-11

Central Division	W	L	GF	GA	BP	Pts	Home	Road
Minnesota Kicks ^{(3)}	17	13	58	43	54	156	11-4	6-9
Tulsa Roughnecks ^{(6)}	15	15	49	46	42	132	11-4	4-11
Dallas Tornado	14	16	51	53	47	131	9-6	5-10
Colorado Caribous	8	22	34	66	33	81	5-10	3-12

Western Division	W	L	GF	GA	BP	Pts	Home	Road
Vancouver Whitecaps ^{(2)}	24	6	68	29	55	199	13-2	11-4
Portland Timbers ^{(4)}	20	10	50	36	47	167	13-2	7-8
Seattle Sounders ^{(8)}	15	15	50	45	48	138	11-4	4-11
Los Angeles Aztecs	9	21	36	69	34	88	3-12	6-9

== NASL League Leaders ==
=== Scoring ===
GP = Games Played, G = Goals (worth 2 points), A = Assists (worth 1 point), Pts = Points

Player	Team	GP	G	A	Pts
(Italy) Giorgio Chinaglia	Cosmos	30	34	11	79
(England) Mike Flanagan	New England Tea Men	28	30	8	68
(England) Trevor Francis	Detroit Express	20	22	10	54
(England) Kevin Hector	Vancouver Whitecaps	28	21	10	52
(England) Rodney Marsh	Tampa Bay Rowdies	26	18	16	52
(England) Jeff Bourne	Dallas Tornado	30	21	8	50
(Germany) Karl-Heinz Granitza	Chicago Sting	22	19	9	47
(England) Alan Willey	Minnesota Kicks	30	21	3	45
(Socialist Federal Republic of Yugoslavia) Ivan Lukačević	Toronto Metros-Croatia	17	16	5	37
(England) David Irving	Fort Lauderdale Strikers	28	16	5	37
(Canada) Bob Lenarduzzi	Vancouver Whitecaps	29	10	17	37
(Socialist Federal Republic of Yugoslavia) Vladislav Bogićević	Cosmos	30	10	17	37

=== Goalkeeping ===
Note: GP = Games played; Min = Minutes played; GA = Goals against; GAA = Goals against average; W = Wins; L = Losses; SO = Shutouts

Player	Team	GP	Min	GA	GAA	W	L	SO
(England) Phil Parkes	Vancouver Whitecaps	29	2650	28	0.95	23	6	10
(Turkey) Erol Yasin	Cosmos	22	1916	24	1.13	17	5	6
(England) Mick Poole	Portland Timbers	30	2783	36	1.16	20	10	9
(England) Steve Hardwick	Detroit Express	30	2734	36	1.19	20	10	9
(England) Kevin Keelan	New England Tea Men	29	2609	36	1.24	18	11	7
(United States) Winston DuBose	Tampa Bay Rowdies	15	1352	19	1.27	8	7	4
(Canada) Željko Bilecki	Toronto Metros-Croatia	17	1550	23	1.34	10	7	6
(United States) Dave Jokerst	California Surf	17	1574	24	1.37	9	8	6
(England) Colin Boulton	Tulsa Roughnecks	28	2531	39	1.39	17	11	10
(Canada) Tony Chursky	Seattle Sounders	28	2617	41	1.41	14	14	9

== NASL All-Stars ==
First Team	Position	Second Team	Honorable Mention
Kevin Keelan, New England	G	(United States) Alan Mayer, San Diego	(Northern Ireland) Bill Irwin, Washington
(Brazil) Carlos Alberto, Cosmos	D	(Canada) Bruce Wilson, Chicago	(England) Maurice Whittle, Fort Lauderdale
(Wales) Mike England, Seattle	D	(Haiti) Arsene Auguste, Tampa Bay	(United States) Werner Roth, Cosmos
(England) Ray Evans, California	D	(England) John Craven, Vancouver	(Scotland) Jim Steele, Washington
Chris Turner, New England	D	(England) Alan Merrick, Minnesota	(United States) Dave D'Errico, New England
(Germany) Franz Beckenbauer, Cosmos	M	(Socialist Federal Republic of Yugoslavia) Vladislav Bogićević, Cosmos	(South Africa) Ace Ntsoelengoe, Minnesota
(Republic of Ireland) Gerry Daly, New England	M	(England) Alan Ball, Philadelphia	(Northern Ireland) George Best, Fort Lauderdale
(England) Rodney Marsh, Tampa Bay	M	(England) Ray Hudson, Fort Lauderdale	(Hungary) József Horváth, Rochester
Mike Flanagan, New England	F	(England) Steve Hunt, Cosmos	(England) Dennis Tueart, Cosmos
(England) Trevor Francis, Detroit	F	(South Africa) Steve Wegerle, Tampa Bay	(Germany) Karl-Heinz Granitza, Chicago
(Italy) Giorgio Chinaglia, Cosmos	F	(England) Kevin Hector, Vancouver	(Bermuda) Clyde Best, Portland • (Denmark) Jorgen Kristensen, Chicago

== Playoffs ==
The first round and the Soccer Bowl were single game match ups, while the conference semifinals and championships were all two-game series.

=== Bracket ===
Conference Quarterfinals	Conference Semifinals
A1	Detroit Express	1
A8	Philadelphia Fury	0
A1	Detroit Express	1
A7	Fort Lauderdale Strikers	2
A2	New England Tea Men	1
A7	Fort Lauderdale Strikers	3
American Conference
A3	San Diego Sockers	2
A6	California Surf	1
A3	San Diego Sockers	1
A4	Tampa Bay Rowdies	2
A4	Tampa Bay Rowdies	3
A5	Chicago Sting	1
N1	Cosmos	5
N8	Seattle Sounders	2
N1	Cosmos	2
N3	Minnesota Kicks	1
N3	Minnesota Kicks	3
N6	Tulsa Roughnecks	1
National Conference
N2	Vancouver Whitecaps	4
N7	Toronto Metros-Croatia	0
N2	Vancouver Whitecaps	0
N4	Portland Timbers	2
N4	Portland Timbers	2
N5	Washington Diplomats	1

Conference Championships
A7	Fort Lauderdale Strikers	1
A4	Tampa Bay Rowdies	2
N1	Cosmos	2
N4	Portland Timbers	0

Soccer Bowl '78
A4	Tampa Bay Rowdies	1
N1	Cosmos	3

=== Conference Quarterfinals ===
August 8	Detroit Express	1–0	Philadelphia Fury	Pontiac Silverdome • 22,456

August 9	New England Tea Men	1–3	Fort Lauderdale Strikers	Schaefer Stadium • 18,672

August 8	San Diego Sockers	2–1	California Surf	San Diego Stadium • 6,238

August 8	Tampa Bay Rowdies	3–1	Chicago Sting	Tampa Stadium • 26,596

August 9	Cosmos	5–2	Seattle Sounders	Giants Stadium • 47,780

August 10	Minnesota Kicks	3–1	Tulsa Roughnecks	Metropolitan Stadium • 36,478

August 9	Vancouver Whitecaps	4–0	Toronto Metros-Croatia	Empire Stadium • 30,811

August 9	Portland Timbers	2–1 (OT)	Washington Diplomats	Civic Stadium • 14,230

=== Conference semifinals ===
In 1978, if a playoff series was tied after two games, a 30 minute, golden goal, mini-game was played. If neither team scored in the mini-game, they would move on to a shoot-out to determine a series winner. *Teams were re-seeded for the Conference Semifinals based on regular season point totals. This affected only one of the four series; Tampa Bay versus San Diego.

Higher seed		Lower seed	Game 1	Game 2	Mini-game	(lower seed hosts Game 1)
Detroit Express	-	Fort Lauderdale Strikers	3–4 (SO, 2–3)	1–0	0–1	August 13 • Lockhart Stadium • 11,517; August 16 • Pontiac Silverdome • 32,219
*Tampa Bay Rowdies	-	San Diego Sockers	1–0	1–2	1–0	August 14 • San Diego Stadium • 8,014; August 17 • Tampa Stadium • 32,495
Cosmos	-	Minnesota Kicks	2–9	4–0	1– 0 (SO, 2–1)	August 14 • Metropolitan Stadium • 45,863; August 16 • Giants Stadium • 60,199
Vancouver Whitecaps	-	Portland Timbers	0–1	1–2	x	August 12 • Civic Stadium • 16,437; August 16 • Empire Stadium • 32,266

=== Conference Championships ===
Higher seed		Lower seed	Game 1	Game 2	Mini-game	(lower seed hosts Game 1)
Tampa Bay Rowdies	-	Fort Lauderdale Strikers	2–3	3–1	1–0 (SO, 2–1)	August 20 • Lockhart Stadium • 16,286; August 23 • Tampa Stadium • 37,249
Cosmos	-	Portland Timbers	1–0	4–0	x	August 18 • Civic Stadium • 24,515; August 23 • Giants Stadium • 65,287

=== Soccer Bowl '78 ===
August 27
4:00 pm EDT

Cosmos	3–1	Tampa Bay Rowdies
Tueart; Chinaglia ( 44:38); Tueart	Report	Mirandinha (73:34)

Giants Stadium, East Rutherford, NJ
Attendance: 74,901
Referee: Jim Highet (Canada)

1978 NASL Champions: Cosmos

== Playoff Statistics ==
Mini-games are not counted as games played when compiling individual statistics. They are included in the minutes played category.

=== Scoring ===
GP = Games Played, G = Goals (worth 2 points), A = Assists (worth 1 point), Pts = Points

Player	Team	GP	G	A	Pts
(England) Dennis Tueart	Cosmos	6	6	5	17
(England) Alan Willey	Minnesota Kicks	3	7	0	14
(Italy) Giorgio Chinaglia	Cosmos	6	5	2	12
(England) David Irving	Fort Lauderdale Strikers	5	5	0	10
(England) Rodney Marsh	Tampa Bay Rowdies	5	3	3	9

=== Goalkeeping ===
Note: GP = Games played; Min = Minutes played; GA = Goals against; GAA = Goals against average; W = Wins; L = Losses; SO = Shutouts

Player	Team	GP	Min	GA	GAA	W	L	SO
(England) Phil Parkes	Vancouver Whitecaps	3	270	3	1.00	1	2	1
(United States) Alan Mayer	San Diego Sockers	3	225	3	1.00	1	1	0
(England) Steve Hardwick	Detroit Express	3	306	4	1.33	2	1	2
(England) Mick Poole	Portland Timbers	5	457	8	1.60	3	2	1
(United States) Winston DuBose	Tampa Bay Rowdies	6	574	10	1.67	3	3	1

== Post season awards ==
- Most Valuable Player: Mike Flanagan, New England
- Coach of the Year: (England) Tony Waiters, Vancouver
- Rookie of the Year: (United States) Gary Etherington, Cosmos
- North American Player of the Year: (Canada) Bob Lenarduzzi, Vancouver

== Team attendance totals ==
Team	Games	Total	Average
Cosmos	15	717,842	47,856
Minnesota Kicks	15	462,904	30,860
Seattle Sounders	15	338,677	22,578
Tampa Bay Rowdies	15	271,856	18,124
Vancouver Whitecaps	15	235,866	15,724
San Jose Earthquakes	15	214,777	14,318
Detroit Express	15	182,906	12,194
New England Tea Men	15	180,954	12,064
Oakland Stompers	15	178,941	11,929
Portland Timbers	15	177,049	11,803
Tulsa Roughnecks	15	168,834	11,256
California Surf	15	167,569	11,171
Washington Diplomats	15	161,741	10,783
Fort Lauderdale Strikers	15	157,188	10,479
Los Angeles Aztecs	15	139,514	9,301
Memphis Rogues	15	135,482	9,032
Dallas Tornado	15	128,149	8,543
Philadelphia Fury	15	121,127	8,075
Houston Hurricane	15	116,247	7,750
Colorado Caribous	15	111,266	7,418
Rochester Lancers	15	101,402	6,760
Toronto Metros-Croatia	15	93,501	6,233
San Diego Sockers	15	77,185	5,146
Chicago Sting	15	69,267	4,618
Overall	360	4,710,244	13,084
