= NSC =

NSC may refer to:

== Banking and investment ==
- National Sort Code, an Irish bank code
- Nomura Securities Co, an investment bank

== Computing ==
- National Software Centre, an Irish organization
- National Supercomputer Centre in Sweden
- NetShow Channel, a streaming media system
  - .nsc, the filename extension for NetShow Channel, now called Windows Media Station
- Network Systems Corporation, a computer product manufacturer
- NonStop Clusters, an SCO UnixWare add-on package

== Education ==
- National Senior Certificate, a South African educational certificate
- Nehru Science Centre, Mumbai, India
- Nevada State College, a public college in Henderson, Nevada, United States
- Northern Southland College, a secondary School in Lumsden, New Zealand
- Yoshimoto New Star Creation, a Japanese comedy school

== Government and politics ==
- National Supervisory Commission, the highest supervision and anti-corruption authority of China
- New Social Contract, a Dutch political party
- National Science Council, a government body in Taiwan renamed as Ministry of Science and Technology
- U.S. Army Natick Soldier Center, a research and development center for soldier equipment

=== National security agencies ===
- National security council, a government body found in many regions
- National Security Committee (Australia), peak decision-making body for national security in the Australian Government
- National Security Committee (Ireland), Irish interdepartmental committee on national security

== Medicine ==
- National Service Center of the US National Cancer Institute
- National Skin Centre, a Singapore medical facility
- Neural stem cell, a concept in nervous system
- Nursing Service Cross, an Australian Honours System medal

== Sport and competition ==
- Nashville SC, an American soccer team
- NSC United, an American soccer team
- National Scholastics Championship, an American quiz bowl competition
- National Scrabble Championship, now known as the Scrabble Players Championship
- National Shooting Centre, a British shooting sports complex near Bisley, United Kingdom
- National Soccer Conference, a conference of the first North American Soccer League
- National Sporting Club, a British boxing club
- National Sports Center, an American sports complex
- National Sports Centre (Isle of Man)
- National Sports Club of India
- Nejmeh SC, a Lebanese association football club
- Nepean Sailing Club, a Canadian sailing club
- North Star Conference, a defunct North American women's college sports conference
- Northern Shores Conference, a Michigan high school athletic conference

== Transport ==
- National Security Cutter, a U.S. Coast Guard ship design
- Network SouthCentral, a British railway company
- Norfolk Southern Railway, an American railway company
- North–South Corridor, Singapore, an expressway in Singapore
- North Spokane Corridor, a freeway in Spokane, Washington, US

== Other uses ==
- National Safety Council, an American nonprofit organization
- National Salvation Committee, a Ukrainian organization
- National Savings Certificates (India), an Indian Government Savings Bond
- National Space Centre (England), a British tourist attraction
- National Space Council, a panel of government and military officials dedicated to the review and improvement of the United States' space programs.
- National Statistical Commission, an Indian organization
- Necessary and sufficient condition, a concept in logic
- Negative sequence component, see Symmetrical components
- New Safe Confinement, the structure intended to contain the nuclear reactor at Chernobyl, Ukraine
- North-South Carrier, a Botswana water pipeline
- Norwegian Space Centre, Norwegian space public activity center renamed as Norwegian Space Agency
