= 1989 Southwest Outdoor Soccer League season =

The 1989 Southwest Outdoor Soccer League season was the first outdoor and fourth overall season of the Southwest Indoor Soccer League.

== Overview ==
After running three winter indoor seasons beginning in 1986, the Southwest Indoor Soccer League added its first summer outdoor season in 1989. With the move outdoors, the league added the Colorado Comets and Tulsa Renegades who quickly proved their worth when they finished at the top of the standing. The move outdoor brought a short-lived name change as the league rebranded itself as the Southwest Outdoor Soccer League. The season began on May 27, 1989.

== League standings ==
Pos	Team	Pld	W	L	GF	GA	GD	BP	Pts
1	Colorado Comets	12	11	1	49	12	+37	54	98
2	Tulsa Renegades	12	10	2	36	13	+23	50	90
3	Addison Arrows	12	8	4	23	16	+7	36	68
4	Austin Sockadillos	12	6	6	32	30	+2	33	57
5	Albuquerque Gunners	12	5	7	31	35	−4	32	52
6	San Antonio Heat	12	4	8	18	35	−17	17	33
7	Lubbock Lazers	12	2	10	15	43	−28	19	27
8	Oklahoma City Warriors	12	2	10	9	36	−27	13	21

Rules for classification: 4 points for a win, 0 points for a loss, 2 bonus points for a regulation win, 2 bonus points for a shoot-out loss, 1 bonus point for each goal scored per game up to 3 per game.

== Semifinal ==
- The Addison Arrows defeated the Tulsa Renegades: 1-1 (PK), 1–4, 0-0 (PK)

== Final ==
1989

Colorado Comets (CO)	3-1	Addison Arrows (TX)

== Honors ==
- Most Valuable Player: Kelvin Norman, Colorado Comets
- Top Scorer: Don Gallegos, Colorado Comets (13 goals)
- Points Leader: Kelvin Norman, Colorado Comets (31 points)
- Assist Leader: Chino Melendez, Colorado Comets; Steve Hayes, Tulsa Renegades (8 assists each)
- Top Goalkeeper: Craig Lemmering, Colorado Comets
- Coach of the Year: Ed Eid, Colorado Comets
