= Tom Conway (footballer, born 1959) =

Irish footballer (born 1959)

Personal information
- Date of birth: 7 March 1959 (age 67)
- Place of birth: Dublin, Ireland
- Position: Left-back

Senior career*
Years	Team	Apps	(Gls)
1977–1985	Athlone Town	178	(6)
1985–1989	Bohemians	62	(4)
1989–1992	Sligo Rovers	?	(?)
1992–1994	Longford Town	20	(3)

International career
1989	League of Ireland XI		
- * Club domestic league appearances and goals

Tom Conway (born 7 March 1959) was an Irish soccer player during the 1980s and 1990s. He comes from a famous footballing family with brothers Jimmy and John also being noted players.

== Career ==
Conway made his League of Ireland debut for Athlone Town A.F.C. on 23 October 1977.

His other clubs in the League of Ireland included Bohemians (who he made 2 European appearances for), Sligo Rovers and Longford Town. Tom won 2 League winners medals with Athlone before joining Bohs in 1985.

Had a joint testimonial with Padraig O'Connor in May 1985.
