= Stephen Hay =

Stephen Hay may refer to:

- Stephen J. Hay (1864–1916), mayor of Dallas, Texas
- Ste Hay, fictional character

== See also ==
- Stephen Hayes (disambiguation)
- Steven Hayes (disambiguation)
