= National Conference (NASL) =

- League: North American Soccer League
- Sport: Soccer
- First season: 1978
- Folded: 1980
- Divisions: East; Central; West
- No. of teams: 12
- Most titles: New York Cosmos (2 titles)

The National Soccer Conference was one of two conferences of the original North American Soccer League between 1978 and 1980. It along with the American Conference were formed for the 1978 season as part of a realignment to accommodate an expanding league, and bolster more competitive play which had been lacking under the previous Atlantic and Pacific conferences. It is speculated, that the league decided to realign the league to be more similar to the National Football League (American football) format, with one league official stating that the league hoped that new expansions and initiatives would cause "enough demand for soccer that they [could] sell the TV rights to two networks like the NFL did." During their three-season tenure, National Conference teams dominated the league, and won all three available league championships. Of these honors, two of them were won by the New York Cosmos, whose only playoff defeat in the National Conference came in 1979 where they were beaten by eventual champions, the Vancouver Whitecaps, in the Conference Finals.

== Teams ==
Following the realignment, the conference was initially made up of four teams from the Atlantic Conference, seven teams from the Pacific Conference, and one team making their NASL debut. After playing just one season, the Colorado Caribous were sold and relocated to Atlanta to revive the Atlanta Chiefs franchise.

Team	Division	First season (Note: Season played in the National Conference. Teams may have played before and/or after the conference existed.)	Last season	Previous conference (division)
New York Cosmos (Note: The New York Cosmos were known simply as the "Cosmos" in the 1978 season.)	East	1978	1980	Atlantic (East)
Rochester Lancers	East	1978	1980	Atlantic (North)
Toronto Blizzard	East	1978	1980	Atlantic (North)
Washington Diplomats	East	1978	1980	Atlantic (East)
Colorado Caribous	Central	1978	1978	1978 debut
Dallas Tornado	Central	1978	1980	Pacific (South)
Minnesota Kicks	Central	1978	1980	Pacific (West)
Tulsa Roughnecks	Central	1978	1980	Pacific (South) (Note: Relocated from Hawaii.)
Atlanta Chiefs	Central	1979	1980	South Division (Note: The 1973 season (the most recent season played by the Atlanta Chiefs) did not have conferences.) (1973)
Los Angeles Aztecs	West	1978	1980	Pacific (South)
Portland Timbers	West	1978	1980	Pacific (West)
Seattle Sounders	West	1978	1980	Pacific (West)
Vancouver Whitecaps	West	1978	1980	Pacific (West)

== Conference honors ==
=== National Conference championships ===
**Bold**	Won NASL Championship

Season	Champions	Series	Runners-up
1978	**Cosmos**	2–0	Portland Timbers
1979	**Vancouver Whitecaps**	2–1 (Note: Series tied 1–1, Vancouver won tiebreaking mini-game)	New York Cosmos
1980	**New York Cosmos**	2–0	Los Angeles Aztecs

=== Regular season titles ===
**Bold**	Most points in NASL

Year	Team	Division	Points (W–L)	Playoffs result
1978	**Cosmos**	East	212 (24–6)	**Won Soccer Bowl**
1978	Vancouver Whitecaps	West	199 (24–6)	Conference Semifinals
1978	Minnesota Kicks	Central	156 (17–13)	Conference Semifinals
1979	**New York Cosmos**	East	216 (24–6)	Lost Conference Final
1979	Minnesota Kicks	Central	184 (21–9)	First Round
1979	Vancouver Whitecaps	West	172 (20–10)	**Won Soccer Bowl**
1980	**New York Cosmos**	East	213 (24–8)	**Won Soccer Bowl**
1980	Seattle Sounders	West	207 (25–7)	Conference Semifinals
1980	Dallas Tornado	Central	157 (18–14)	Conference Semifinals

== See also ==
- National Football Conference
- National League (baseball)
- Eastern Conference (MLS)
- Western Conference (MLS)
