= Jokerst =

Jokerst is a German surname of uncertain etymology. Notable people with the surname include:

- Dave Jokerst (born 1948), American soccer player
- Nan Marie Jokerst, American engineer
