= Steven Hayes =

Steven Hayes may refer to:

- Steve Hayes (businessman), English businessman and former owner of rugby union side London Wasps
- Steve Hayes (basketball) (born 1955), American basketball player
- Steve Hayes (footballer) (born 1985), Australian soccer player
- Steve Hayes (soccer) (born 1959), American soccer player and coach
- Linda Hayes (born 1963 as Steven Joseph Hayes), perpetrator of the Cheshire home invasion murders
- Steven C. Hayes (born 1948), American psychologist
- Steve Hayes (actor), known for Cavalcade of America (1955)

== See also ==
- Stephen Hayes (disambiguation)
