= Stephen Hayes =

Stephen Hayes may refer to:

- Stephen Hayes (Irish republican) (1902–1974), member and leader of the Irish Republican Army
- Stephen Hayes (hurler) (1860–1929), Irish hurler
- Stephen F. Hayes (born 1970), American senior writer at The Weekly Standard
- Stephen K. Hayes (born 1949), American martial artist and writer
- Stephen Hayes (business executive), American international development and trade executive

== See also ==
- Steven Hayes (disambiguation)
- Stephen Hay (disambiguation)
