= David Bradford (footballer) =

English footballer and manager

Personal information
- Date of birth: 22 February 1953 (age 73)
- Place of birth: Manchester, England
- Height: 5 ft 5 in (1.65 m)
- Position: Midfielder

Youth career
- 1968–1971: Blackburn Rovers

Senior career*
Years	Team	Apps	(Gls)
1971–1974	Blackburn Rovers	64	(3)
1974–1977	Sheffield United	60	(3)
1976	→ Peterborough United (loan)	4	(0)
1978–1980	Detroit Express	90	(14)
1980–1981	Detroit Express (indoor)	17	(22)
1981	Washington Diplomats	30	(4)
1981–1982	Coventry City	6	(1)
1982	Tulsa Roughnecks	28	(5)
1982–1983	Baltimore Blast (indoor)	32	(6)
1983	Seattle Sounders	25	(1)
1983–1984	Tulsa Roughnecks (indoor)	32	(17)
1984	Tulsa Roughnecks	24	(1)
- * Club domestic league appearances and goals

David Bradford (born 22 February 1953) is a retired professional football midfielder from England.

In 1968, Bradford began his career as a fifteen-year-old apprentice with Blackburn Rovers. In 1971, he moved up to the first team. In 1974, they sent him to Sheffield United for £10,000 where he played for Ken Furphy. In 1978, Furphy, now coach of the Detroit Express of the North American Soccer League, brought Bradford to the United States. In 1981, he signed with the Washington Diplomats. He returned to England at the end of the NASL 1981 season and played for Coventry City in 1981–1982 before returning in the 1982 season with the Tulsa Roughnecks. Bradford played for the Baltimore Blast in the Major Indoor Soccer League in 1982–1983. In 1983, he played for the Seattle Sounders. The team folded at the end of the season and Bradford returned to the Roughnecks for the last season of the NASL.

After his retirement, he managed the Brownhill post office for over a decade. He now coaches in the Tulsa Soccer Academy.
