= Andy Crawford (footballer, born 1967) =

Scottish-American soccer player and coach

Personal information
- Full name: Andrew Crawford
- Date of birth: March 27, 1967 (age 59)
- Place of birth: Dumfries, Scotland
- Height: 5 ft 6 in (1.68 m)
- Positions: Forward; midfielder

Youth career
- 1985–1988: Siena Heights College

Senior career*
Years	Team	Apps	(Gls)
1989	Permian Basin Shooting Stars (indoor)		
1989–1992	Colorado Comets (indoor)		
1992–1993	Denver Thunder (indoor)	37	(25)
1993	Arizona Sandsharks (indoor)		
1993–1994	Detroit Rockers (indoor)	29	(16)
1994–2001	Buffalo Blizzard (indoor)	259	(298)
2008–2009	Detroit Ignition (indoor)	16	(7)

Managerial career
- 1994–2001: Hilbert College (women)
- 1995–2001: Hilbert College (men)
- * Club domestic league appearances and goals

Andrew "Andy" or "Drew" Crawford is a Scottish-American soccer coach and retired player who played professionally in the National Professional Soccer League and the Continental Indoor Soccer League.

== Player ==
=== Youth ===
Born in Scotland, Crawford grew up in Three Rivers, Michigan. In 1985, he graduated from Three Rivers High School where he was an All State soccer player. Crawford attended Siena Heights College, playing on the men's soccer team from 1985 to 1988. During his four seasons with the Saints, he was a 1987 First Team and a 1988 Honorable Mention NAIA All American. His seventy goals and twenty-nine assists puts him second on the school's career goals and career points lists. He graduated in 1989. In 1999, Siena Heights inducted Crawford into the school's Athletic Hall of Fame.

=== Professional ===
In 1989, Crawford joined the Permian Basin Shooting Stars of the Southwest Indoor Soccer League. During the season, he moved to the Colorado Comets where he played until 1992. Crawford was the 1989–90 Southwest Independent Soccer League MVP. During the 1990–91 season, he scored thirty-five goals in sixteen games, giving him first place on the points list. During the 1991–92 season, he scored twenty-five goals in fourteen games. This brought Crawford to the attention of the Denver Thunder of the National Professional Soccer League. In his first season in the National Professional Soccer League, Crawford finished with 68 points, tops for all rookies which put on the All Rookie Team. In 1993, Crawford spent the summer season with the Arizona Sandsharks of the Continental Indoor Soccer League. In the fall of 1993, Crawford moved to the Detroit Rockers of the National Professional Soccer League. On December 1, 1994, the Buffalo Blizzard purchased Crawford's contract from the Detroit Rockers. Crawford remained with the Blizzard until they ceased operations in 2001. He was a 1997 and 2001 NPSL All Star. In August 2001, the Harrisburg Heat selected Crawford in the dispersal draft, but Crawford declined to join the Heat and moved to Michigan instead. In December 2008, Crawford joined the Detroit Ignition of the Xtreme Soccer League. The Ignition won the league title that season.

== Coach ==
In 1995, while playing for the Buffalo Blizzard, Crawford was hired as the women's soccer coach at Hilbert College. In 1996, he became the men's soccer coach as well. When the Blizzard ceased operations in 2001, Crawford resigned as head coach to move to Michigan. He was also hired to be the Siena Heights Women's soccer coach on February 1, 2018.
