= Roman Rosul =

American soccer player

Personal information
- Full name: Arthur D. Roderick
- Date of birth: May 10, 1953 (age 73)
- Place of birth: Cleveland, Ohio, U.S.
- Height: 6 ft 0 in (1.83 m)
- Position: Forward

Youth career
- Cleveland Lviv

College career
Years	Team	Apps	(Gls)
1972–1975	Cleveland State Vikings		

Senior career*
Years	Team	Apps	(Gls)
1973	Cleveland Inter-Italian		
1976	Miami Toros	14	(4)
1977	Fort Lauderdale Strikers	2	(1)
1977	Connecticut Bicentennials	13	(3)
1978–1980	Memphis Rogues	23	(9)
1983	Jacksonville Tea Men		
- * Club domestic league appearances and goals

Roman Rosul is an American retired soccer player who played professionally in the North American Soccer League and American Soccer League.

== Youth ==
The son of Ukrainian immigrant parents, Rosul played for the Cleveland Lviv youth teams growing up. In 1971, he graduated from Rocky River High School. He scored 32 goals in 11 games his senior season as the team went undefeated and won the Ohio State High School soccer championship. He then attended Cleveland State University where he played on the men's soccer team from 1972 to 1975. He was a 1975 Honorable Mention (third team) All American and was inducted into the Vikings' Hall of Fame in 1988. In addition to his collegiate career, Rosul also played for the amateur Inter-Italia SC of Cleveland which lost to Maccabi Los Angeles in the 1973 National Challenge Cup. In that game, Rosul both scored and was ejected with a straight red.

== Professional ==
In 1976, the Miami Toros drafted him in the first round of the North American Soccer League draft. In 1977, he began the season with the Fort Lauderdale Strikers before moving to the Connecticut Bicentennials. At the end of the season, the Bicentennials moved to California to become the Oakland Stompers. Rosul signed with the Stompers, but was traded to the Memphis Rogues where he played from 1978 to 1980. In April 1983, he joined the Jacksonville Tea Men of the American Soccer League.
