= John Conway (footballer, born 1951) =

Irish former footballer

Personal information
- Full name: John Conway
- Date of birth: 11 July 1951 (age 75)
- Place of birth: Dublin, Ireland
- Position: Right winger

Senior career*
Years	Team	Apps	(Gls)
1969–1971	Bohemians		
1971–1975	Fulham	38	(6)
1975–1976	FC Winterthur		
1975–1977	Shamrock Rovers		
- * Club domestic league appearances and goals

John Conway (born 11 July 1951) is an Irish former footballer, who played in the 1960s and 1970s.

== Career ==
John was a midfielder who played his schoolboy football for the Stella Maris before moving on to Bohemians amongst others during his career in the League of Ireland. He made 2 appearances in European competition for Bohs and won the FAI Cup with the club in 1970. Between 1971 and 1975, Conway played for English side Fulham. He only played 38 league matches for Fulham, scoring six goals.

Conway then moved to Switzerland to sign for FC Winterthur. He came home to sign for Shamrock Rovers in February 1976 under manager Mick Meagan but returned to Winterthur in 1977. He retired in 1981 and now lives in Thailand.

His more famous brother Jimmy also had a spell at Bohemians before moving abroad.
