= Dennis Tueart =

English footballer (born 1949)

Personal information
- Date of birth: 27 November 1949 (age 76)
- Place of birth: Newcastle upon Tyne, England
- Height: 5 ft 8 in (1.73 m)
- Position: Left winger

Senior career*
Years	Team	Apps	(Gls)
1968–1974	Sunderland	178	(46)
1974–1978	Manchester City	140	(59)
1978–1980	New York Cosmos	47	(26)
1980–1983	Manchester City	84	(27)
1983	Stoke City	3	(0)
1983–1984	Burnley	15	(5)
1985–1986	Derry City	10	(1)
Total		477	(164)

International career
1974	England U23	1	(2)
1975–1977	England	6	(2)
- * Club domestic league appearances and goals

Dennis Tueart (born 27 November 1949) is an English former footballer who played for Sunderland, Manchester City, Stoke City and Burnley at club level. On the international scene, he won six full caps for England.

== Career ==
Tueart was born in Newcastle upon Tyne and began his career with Sunderland. Following their relegation in 1969–70 the Wearsiders tried in vain to gain a quick return to the First Division but found success in the FA Cup winning the competition in 1973 by beating Leeds United 1–0. In March 1974 Tueart signed for Manchester City and was part of the winning team in the 1976 League Cup final, memorable for him scoring with a spectacular overhead kick. He scored 73 goals in 173 matches for Man City.

He moved to the United States to join the New York Cosmos, where he not only won Soccer Bowl '78, but was named man of the match for netting two goals in the Cosmos' 3–1 victory over Tampa Bay. Tueart remained with New York until 1980.

He re-signed for Manchester City in February 1980. He spent four years back at Maine Road, coming on as a substitute in the replay of the 1981 FA Cup final, until the club was relegated in 1982–83. He joined Stoke City in August 1983 in time for the start of the 1983–84 season, but now into his mid-thirties Tueart struggled to force his way into the starting line up at the Victoria Ground and after making just four appearances by December he left for Burnley. He saw out the remainder of the 1983–84 season with the Clarets and later played for Irish club Derry City.

== Post-retirement ==
Tueart later became a director of Manchester City, where he was heavily involved in the appointments of managers Joe Royle and Kevin Keegan. In July 2007, following the takeover of Manchester City by Thaksin Shinawatra, Tueart was sacked as a director, ending a 33-year association as a player and director with the club. In a competition where more than 20,000 supporters cast their votes on the 50 golden moments as nominated on The Football League's special 50th anniversary website, Dennis Tueart's winning goal against Newcastle United for Manchester City in the 1976 League Cup final was voted the greatest moment in the competition's history.

Outside of football, Tueart is a director of conferencing business Premier Events.

== Personal life ==
Tueart has three sons with his wife Joan. His autobiography, titled My Football Journey, described how he lost multiple members of his family to cancer, with Tueart donating the royalties from his book to The Christie cancer hospital.

== Career statistics ==
=== Club ===
Appearances and goals by club, season and competition
Club	Season	League			FA Cup		League Cup		Europe		Other^{[A]}		Total	
Club	Season	Division	Apps	Goals	Apps	Goals	Apps	Goals	Apps	Goals	Apps	Goals	Apps	Goals
Sunderland	1968–69	First Division	10	2	1	0	0	0	0	0	0	0	11	2
Sunderland	1969–70	First Division	39	4	1	0	0	1	1	0	4	1	45	6
Sunderland	1970–71	Second Division	20	4	1	0	0	0	0	0	0	0	21	4
Sunderland	1971–72	Second Division	42	13	4	0	1	0	0	0	4	2	51	15
Sunderland	1972–73	Second Division	40	12	9	3	1	0	0	0	0	0	53	15
Sunderland	1973–74	Second Division	27	11	2	0	3	1	4	2	0	0	36	14
Sunderland	Total		178	46	18	3	5	2	5	2	8	3	217	56
Manchester City	1973–74	First Division	8	1	0	0	0	0	0	0	0	0	8	1
Manchester City	1974–75	First Division	39	14	1	0	2	0	0	0	3	2	45	16
Manchester City	1975–76	First Division	38	14	2	2	7	8	0	0	3	0	50	24
Manchester City	1976–77	First Division	38	18	4	0	1	0	2	0	0	0	45	18
Manchester City	1977–78	First Division	17	12	2	1	5	2	1	0	0	0	25	14
Manchester City	Total		140	59	10	3	15	10	3	0	6	2	173	73
New York Cosmos	1978	NASL	20	10	–		–		–		–		20	10
New York Cosmos	1979	NASL	27	16	–		–		–		–		27	16
New York Cosmos	Total		47	26	–		–		–		–		47	26
Manchester City	1979–80	First Division	11	5	1	0	0	0	0	0	0	0	12	5
Manchester City	1980–81	First Division	22	8	3	0	5	4	0	0	0	0	30	12
Manchester City	1981–82	First Division	15	9	0	0	4	2	0	0	0	0	19	11
Manchester City	1982–83	First Division	36	5	3	0	3	2	0	0	0	0	42	7
Manchester City	Total		84	28	7	0	12	8	0	0	0	0	103	36
Stoke City	1983–84	First Division	3	0	0	0	1	0	0	0	0	0	4	0
Burnley	1983–84	Third Division	15	5	2	0	0	0	0	0	2	0	19	5
Career Total			467	163	37	6	33	20	8	2	16	5	561	196

A. The "Other" column constitutes appearances and goals in the Anglo-Italian Cup, Anglo-Scottish Cup, Texaco Cup and Full Members Cup.

=== International ===
National team	Year	Apps	Goals
England	1975	2	0
England	1976	1	1
England	1977	3	1
Total		6	2

== Honours ==
Sunderland

- FA Cup: 1972–73

Manchester City

- Football League Cup: 1975–76
- FA Cup runner-up: 1980–81

New York Cosmos

- NASL: 1978, 1979
- Soccer Bowl: 1978

Individual

- PFA Team of the Year: 1973–74 Second Division, 1976–77 First Division
