= Alan Thompson (footballer, born 1952) =

English footballer

Personal information
- Full name: William Alan Thompson
- Date of birth: 20 January 1952 (age 74)
- Place of birth: Liverpool, England
- Height: 5 ft 10 in (1.78 m)
- Position: Central defender

Senior career*
Years	Team	Apps	(Gls)
1970–1976	Sheffield Wednesday	156	(3)
1976–1979	Stockport County	94	(17)
1979	Portland Timbers	25	(2)
1980–1982	Bradford City	31	(0)
1982	Scunthorpe United	11	(0)
Total		317	(22)
- * Club domestic league appearances and goals

William Alan Thompson (born 20 January 1952) is an English former professional footballer who played as a central defender.

== Career ==
Born in Liverpool, Thompson played for Sheffield Wednesday, Stockport County, Portland Timbers, Bradford City and Scunthorpe United.

Thompson signed for Bradford City in January 1980, having previously played in the United States with the Portland Timbers. He made 35 appearances for the club – 31 in the league, one in the FA Cup, and three in the Football League Cup. He left the club in March 1982 to sign for Scunthorpe United.

== Sources ==
- Frost, Terry (1988). Bradford City A Complete Record 1903–1988. Breedon Books Sport. ISBN 0-907969-38-0.
