= Tony Field (footballer, born 1946) =

English footballer (1946–2026)

Personal information
- Date of birth: 6 July 1946
- Place of birth: Halifax, England
- Date of death: 7 January 2026 (aged 79)
- Place of death: Memphis, Tennessee, U.S.
- Position: Forward

Youth career
- Halifax Town

Senior career*
Years	Team	Apps	(Gls)
1963–1966	Halifax Town	21	(3)
1966–1967	Barrow	38	(16)
1967–1971	Southport	133	(41)
1971–1974	Blackburn Rovers	106	(45)
1974–1976	Sheffield United	66	(13)
1976–1977	New York Cosmos	44	(13)
1978–1980	Memphis Rogues	75	(18)
1979–1980	→ Memphis Rogues (indoor)	0	(0)
1980–1981	New England Tea Men (indoor)	14	(3)
Total		497	(152)
- * Club domestic league appearances and goals

Tony Field (6 July 1946 – 7 January 2026) was an English professional footballer who played as a forward. Active in both England and the United States between 1963 and 1981, Field made nearly 500 career League appearances, scoring over 150 goals.

== Career ==
Born in Halifax, Field played youth football with hometown club Halifax Town, before turning professional in 1963. Field also played in the Football League with Barrow, Southport, Blackburn Rovers and Sheffield United.

Field later played in the North American Soccer League for the New York Cosmos (being on the 1977 NASL Soccer Bowl Champions team) and Team MVP, the Memphis Rogues, and the New England Tea Men.

== Death ==
Field died in Memphis, Tennessee, on 7 January 2026, at the age of 79.
