= Ken Furphy =

English footballer and manager

Personal information
- Full name: Kenneth Furphy
- Date of birth: 28 May 1931
- Place of birth: Stockton-on-Tees, England
- Date of death: 17 January 2015 (aged 83)
- Place of death: Dawlish, England
- Position: Defender

Senior career*
Years	Team	Apps	(Gls)
1950–1951	Everton	0	(0)
1951–1953	Runcorn		
1953–1962	Darlington	316	(6)
1962–1964	Workington	105	(3)
1964–1968	Watford	111	(1)

Managerial career
- 1962–1964: Workington
- 1964–1971: Watford
- 1971–1973: Blackburn Rovers
- 1973–1975: Sheffield United
- 1976: New York Cosmos
- 1976–1977: Miami Toros
- 1977–1980: Detroit Express
- 1981: Washington Diplomats
- * Club domestic league appearances and goals

Kenneth Furphy (28 May 1931 – 17 January 2015) was an English football player and manager.

Despite being on the books at Everton between 1950 and 1951, Furphy was a lower league player with Runcorn (1951–53) Darlington (1953–62) and then Workington (1962–64). He was selected to play for the Third Division North representative side in 1954–55.

In 1964, as Workington's player-manager, he led them into the Third Division and left to become player-manager at Watford where he remained for several years, winning promotion to the Second Division for the first time in the club's history in 1969, and reaching the FA Cup semi-final a year later. He moved to Blackburn Rovers as manager in 1971 for two seasons before being announced as the new manager of Sheffield United on 9 December 1973.

Despite financial difficulties due to the building of the new South Stand, he led United to sixth place in the First Division; a 0–0 draw away to Birmingham City on the last day of the 1974–75 season left them just one point short of a UEFA Cup place. However, the following season started disastrously with just one win from 11 games and his contract was terminated on 6 October 1975. Furphy left for America to manage the New York Cosmos (1975–76) in the NASL. He also coached the Miami Toros (1976–77), the Detroit Express (1977–80) and the Washington Diplomats (1981). He has also managed the national team of Bermuda and the Cleveland Force.

During the 2000–01 season he was appointed as technical director of Exeter City, to help then manager Noel Blake as the club battled against relegation; this tenure was short-lived, and he left the club after just six days in the job.

He also worked for BBC Radio Devon's sports department, commentating on local football matches.

He coached his son, former NASL and MISL player Keith Furphy, while both were in Detroit.

Furphy died on 17 January 2015 in a care home in Dawlish, where he had dementia.
