= David Butler (footballer, born 1953) =

English footballer

David Joan Butler
Personal information
- Date of birth: 30 March 1953 (age 73)
- Place of birth: West Bromwich, England
- Position: Striker

Youth career
- 1966–1972: West Bromwich Albion

Senior career*
Years	Team	Apps	(Gls)
1972–1973	West Bromwich Albion	0	(0)
1973–1974	Shrewsbury Town	10	(0)
1973–1974	→ Workington (loan)	10	(0)
1974–1978	Seattle Sounders	97	(34)
1979	Portland Timbers	20	(6)
1979–1980	Pittsburgh Spirit (indoor)	11	(6)
1980–1981	Baltimore Blast (indoor)	2	(0)
1981–1982	Kansas City Comets (indoor)	15	(8)
1981–1982	Philadelphia Fever (indoor)	17	(2)
1983	Seattle Sounders	1	(0)
- * Club domestic league appearances and goals

David J. Butler (born 30 March 1953) is an English former football striker who played professionally in England, the North American Soccer League and Major Indoor Soccer League.

Butler began his career as a sixteen-year-old apprentice with West Bromwich Albion before moving to Shrewsbury Town in 1973. He also played ten games on loan to Workington A.F.C. during the 1973–1974 season. In 1974, Shrewsbury Town released Butler when he received an offer to play for the Seattle Sounders of the North American Soccer League. He signed with the Sounders and played through the 1978 season with them. In 1979, he played a single season with the Portland Timbers before moving indoors with the Pittsburgh Spirit for the 1979–1980 Major Indoor Soccer League season. In 1983, he returned to the Sounders to coach the reserve team and played 1 more first team game.
