= National Software Centre =

The National Software Centre (NSC) is based in Mahon, Cork and was built under an Irish Government initiative to establish a centre of excellence for the SMART economy. The project is a privately led venture via a public–private partnership.

The NSC Campus hosts the Network Operations Centre in Cork for the 60 km Cork MAN (48/96 pair fibre ring metropolitan area network) which launched in January 2004.
