= Elson Seale =

Personal information
- Date of birth: June 13, 1955 (age 71)
- Place of birth: Bridgetown, Barbados
- Height: 5 ft 7 in (1.70 m)
- Position: Forward

College career
Years	Team	Apps	(Gls)
1972–1975	Philadelphia Rams		

Senior career*
Years	Team	Apps	(Gls)
1978–1979	Portland Timbers	35	(5)
1979–1982	Philadelphia Fever (indoor)	102	(60)
1981	Pennsylvania Stoners	23	(9)
1982–1985	Kansas City Comets (indoor)	117	(56)
- * Club domestic league appearances and goals

Elson Seale is a Barbados-American soccer forward who played in the North American Soccer League, American Soccer League and Major Indoor Soccer League. He is currently an independent businessman in the Kansas City area.

Seale attended Columbia High School in Maplewood, New Jersey, graduating in 1971. In 1999, he was named by The Star-Ledger as one of the top ten New Jersey high school soccer players of the 1970s. He then attended Philadelphia University, where he played on the men's soccer team from 1974 to 1977. He was a 1973 Honorable Mention (third team), 1974 Second Team and 1975 First-Team All-American. He graduated in 1976. He was inducted into the school's Athletic Hall of Fame in 2005.

He began his professional career in 1978 with the Portland Timbers of the North American Soccer League. In 1979, he moved indoors with the Philadelphia Fever of the Major Indoor Soccer League. In 1981, he returned to outdoor soccer with the Pennsylvania Stoners of the American Soccer League. He then finished his career with the Kansas City Comets of MISL. He may have also spent time in the German Regionalliga.

In 1989, he founded Packaging Solutions in Kansas City, Missouri. In 1997, he founded Bajan Industries, also in Kansas City, while remaining CEO and president of Packaging Solutions.
