= Maurice Whittle =

English footballer

Personal information
- Date of birth: 15 July 1948 (age 78)
- Place of birth: Wigan, England
- Position: Left back

Senior career*
Years	Team	Apps	(Gls)
1968–1969	Blackburn Rovers	7	(0)
1969–1977	Oldham Athletic	312	(39)
1977–1979	Fort Lauderdale Strikers	80	(16)
1979–1980	Barrow	?	(?)
1980–1981	Wigan Athletic	21	(1)
1981–1982	Barrow	?	(?)
1983	Macclesfield Town	1	(0)
Total		421	(56)
- * Club domestic league appearances and goals

Maurice Whittle (born 15 July 1948 in Wigan, Lancashire, England), is an English footballer who played as a left back in the Football League.
