= Kelvin Norman =

American soccer player and coach

Personal information
- Date of birth: October 10, 1955
- Place of birth: Cambridge, Massachusetts, United States
- Date of death: November 8, 2005 (aged 50)
- Place of death: Arapahoe County, United States
- Height: 5 ft 10 in (1.78 m)
- Position: Defender

Senior career*
Years	Team	Apps	(Gls)
1978–1979	Portland Timbers	4	(0)
1979–1980	New England Tea Men (indoor)	3	(0)
1980–1982	Denver Avalanche (indoor)	74	(6)
1982–1983	Los Angeles Lazers (indoor)	40	(1)
1985–1992	Colorado Comets		

Managerial career
- 1985–1989: Colorado Comets
- 1989: Colorado Comets (assistant)
- 1989–1992: Colorado Comets
- * Club domestic league appearances and goals

Kelvin Norman was an American soccer defender who played in the North American Soccer League, Major Indoor Soccer League and SISL. He was the 1989 Southwest Outdoor Soccer League MVP and coached the Colorado Comets in the SISL and USISL.

In 1978, Norman signed with the Portland Timbers of the North American Soccer League. He spent two seasons with the Timbers, largely in the reserves. In the fall of 1979, he moved to the New England Tea Men where he saw time in three games during the NASL indoor season. He then moved to the Denver Avalanche of the Major Indoor Soccer League. He played two seasons with Denver, then finished with one season with the Los Angeles Lazers. Norman then became the head coach of the amateur Colorado Comets. In 1989, the Comets entered, and won, the Southwest Outdoor Soccer League under the direction of Ed Eid. Norman spent that season as a player-assistant coach and was named the 1989 SOSL Most Valuable Player.

On Nov. 8, 2005, an aggressive driver pulled behind Norman, who was driving a Toyota 4Runner, and began tailgating. Norman changed lanes, and when the aggressor passed he pulled in front of Norman and hit his brakes, causing the 4Runner to swerve. Norman's vehicle flew up and crashed upside-down into a Ford Explorer. Norman died at the scene. The aggressor was not hurt. The Colorado Rapids Youth Soccer Club holds an annual Kelvin Norman Memorial Soccer Tournament.
