= Caribous of Colorado =

Defunct American soccer club

- Full name: Caribous of Colorado
- Nickname: The Caribous
- Founded: 1978
- Dissolved: 1978
- Stadium: Mile High Stadium
- Capacity: 76,000
- Chairman: Booth Gardner
- Coach: Dave Clements; Dan Wood
- League: North American Soccer League
Home colors	Away colors

The Caribous of Colorado were an American soccer team that competed in the North American Soccer League (NASL) during the 1978 season. The team was based in Denver, Colorado and played their home games at Mile High Stadium. After the season, the club was sold and moved to Atlanta to become the Atlanta Chiefs.

== History ==
At the conclusion of the 1975 North American Soccer League season, the Denver Dynamos, playing only their second season, moved to Minnesota and became the Minnesota Kicks, leaving the city without a professional soccer team. During the NASL league annual meetings in December 1976, Booth Gardner and James Guercio were awarded a NASL franchise for Denver for the 1978 season. Gardner, former owner of the defunct Tacoma Tides of the American Soccer League (and future governor of Washington state), partnered with music producer Guercio (owner of the Caribou Ranch recording studio), paying a cool million dollars for the franchise. The team name of Caribous of Colorado was announced on May 31, 1977. Dave Clements, who played for the 1977 Soccer Bowl champion New York Cosmos, was hired as a player/coach. In April 1978, Dan Wood, previously coach of the Tacoma Tides and Cornell University men's soccer team, was named general manager.

The Caribous opened the 1978 North American Soccer League season on the road, losing 3–0 to the Seattle Sounders at the Kingdome on April 1, 1978. After 20 games and a 6-14 record, Clements was fired as head coach and replaced by Dan Woods; things did not improve, as the club lost eight of their last ten matches to finish with a 8-22 mark and a league-worst 81 points. Colorado's offense was bad with only 34 goals, also last in the NASL (Clements' Cosmos teammate Jomo Sono led the Caribous with eight) and so was attendance (7,418 per match, with only one crowd in five figures all year). After the season, the club was purchased and moved to Atlanta to become the (new) Atlanta Chiefs.

=== Uniforms ===
The lasting legacy of the Caribous is one of the most unusual, infamous uniforms in soccer history. Going with a western-style motif, the players wore brown and tan jerseys that included a strip of leather fringe across the chest. In 2009, the uniforms were voted the "worst soccer uniform in history" by the readers of the Uni Watch sports design site.

On April 1, 2014, the Colorado Rapids of MLS announced the club would wear Caribou "throwback" jerseys for an upcoming home game. It was quickly revealed as an April Fools joke, but not before the team was swamped with calls and e-mails from fans wondering where they could buy replicas of the infamous duds.

== Media coverage ==
The Caribous had 5 road games broadcast on KOA-TV and 28 of 30 matches on KWBZ radio. There were matches in Spanish on KBNO (at 1220 am, not to be confused with current KBNO at 1280 am). Longtime Denver Broncos radio announcer Larry Zimmer was play-by-play man.

== Year-by-year ==
Year	League	W	L	Pts	Regular season	Playoffs	Avg. attendance
1978	NASL	8	22	81	4th, National Conference, Central Division	did not qualify	7,418

== Coaches ==
- (Northern Ireland) Dave Clements
- (United States) Dan Wood
