= Steve Hayes (soccer) =

American soccer player and coach

Personal information
- Place of birth: United States
- Position: Midfielder

Youth career
- 1986–1989: George Mason Patriots

Senior career*
Years	Team	Apps	(Gls)
1989	Tulsa Renegades		
1990	Washington Stars		
1991–1992	Tulsa Ambush (indoor)		

Managerial career
- 1992–1994: Oral Roberts Golden Eagles (assistant)
- 1994–1998: Oral Roberts Golden Eagles – women
- 1998–2012: Oral Roberts Golden Eagles – men
- * Club domestic league appearances and goals

Steve Hayes is an American retired professional soccer player and college coach. He played professionally in the American Professional Soccer League and National Professional Soccer League. He spent his entire coaching career at Oral Roberts University.

== Player ==
Hayes graduated from Memorial High School. He attended George Mason University, playing on the men's soccer team from 1986 to 1989. In the summer of 1989, Hayes played for the Tulsa Renegades in the Southwest Outdoor Soccer League. He tied for the top of the season assist list. In 1990, Hayes moved to the Washington Stars of the American Professional Soccer League. He finished his professional career with the Tulsa Ambush during the 1991–1992 National Professional Soccer League season.

== Coach ==
In 1992, Hayes entered the coaching ranks as an assistant with the Oral Roberts University men's soccer team. In 1994, he moved up to become the head coach of the Oral Roberts women's team. In 1998, Hayes switched to the men's team, coaching it until 2012. Resigned after the 2012 season.
