= Jimmy Conway (footballer) =

Irish footballer (1946–2020)

Personal information
- Full name: James Patrick Conway
- Date of birth: 10 August 1946
- Place of birth: Dublin, Ireland
- Date of death: 14 February 2020 (aged 73)
- Position: Midfielder

Youth career
- Stella Maris

Senior career*
| Years | Team | Apps | (Gls) |
| 1964–1966 | Bohemians | 44 | (10) |
| 1966–1976 | Fulham | 314 | (67) |
| 1976–1978 | Manchester City | 13 | (1) |
| 1978–1980 | Portland Timbers | 61 | (7) |
| 1978 | → Athlone Town (loan) | 5 | (0) |
| 1980–1982 | Portland Timbers (indoor) | 8 | (2) |
| Total | | 445 | (87) |

International career
| 1966–1977 | Republic of Ireland | 20 | (3) |

Managerial career
- 1980–1982: Portland Timbers (assistant)
- 1982–1988: Pacific University
- 1988–1996: Oregon State Beavers
- 2000–2009: Portland Timbers (assistant)
- * Club domestic league appearances and goals

James Patrick Conway (10 August 1946 – 14 February 2020) was an Irish international footballer who played professionally in Ireland, England and the United States. He earned 20 caps for the Republic of Ireland national football team, playing mainly as a midfielder, and coached extensively at the professional and collegiate levels in the United States.

== Player ==
=== Professional ===
Born in Dublin, Conway began his career with Stella Maris. From there he moved to Bohemians in 1964 as a senior in his home city. In 1966, he moved to Fulham. A midfielder or winger, he spent ten years at Craven Cottage, scoring 67 times in 314 League games before a £30,000 fee brought him north to join Manchester City in August 1976. He was a member of the Fulham side that reached the 1975 FA Cup Final. He played with his brother John at Fulham and his brother Tom also played professionally. Having played just 13 times for City, scoring the winning goal in the final game of the season against Coventry City when Manchester City came second to Liverpool in 1977, he moved to the Portland Timbers of the North American Soccer League for £10,000 on 17 January 1978. He spent three seasons with the Timbers.

=== International ===
At the international level, Conway earned 20 caps for the Republic of Ireland.

== Manager ==
In 1980, Conway became a player-coach with the Portland Timbers. In 1982, he became the head coach of the Pacific University men's team. In 1988, he became the first collegiate head men's soccer coach in Oregon State University history. He coached the Beavers from 1988 to 1999, and compiled a 97-89-13 record at the helm. In November 2000, he became an assistant coach with the Portland Timbers of the USL First Division.

His son, Paul also had a professional career.

== Honours ==
Fulham

- FA Cup runner-up: 1974–75
