= Keith Furphy =

English-American footballer (born 1958)

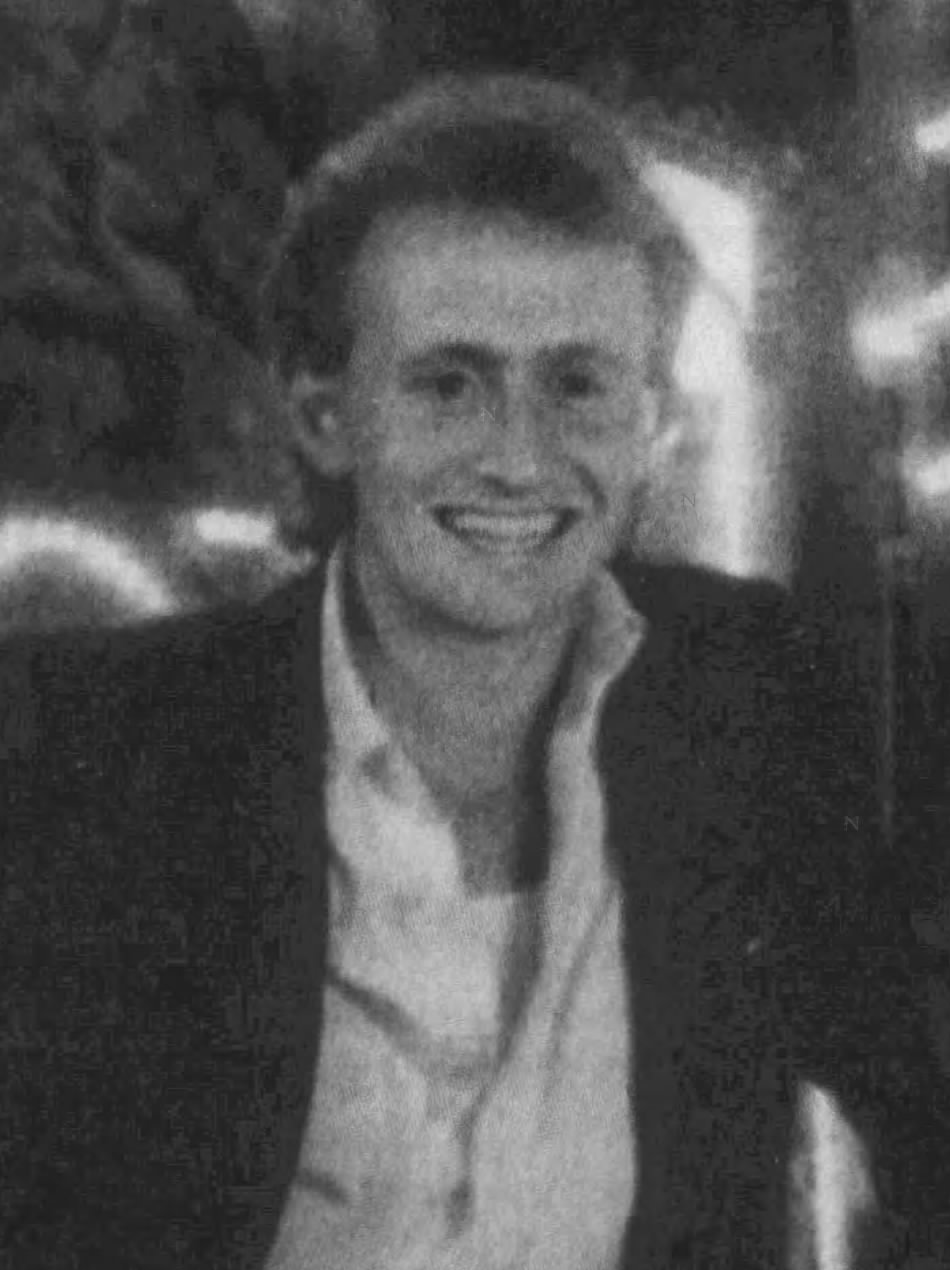
- Furphy in 1986

Personal information
- Date of birth: 30 July 1958 (age 68)
- Place of birth: Stockton-on-Tees, England
- Positions: Forward; winger

Senior career*
Years	Team	Apps	(Gls)
1977–1978	Wealdstone		
1978–1980	Detroit Express	65	(26)
1979–1980	Detroit Express (indoor)	12	(21)
1980–1981	Atlanta Chiefs	57	(17)
1981–1985	Cleveland Force (indoor)	188	(185)
1983	→ Detroit Express (loan)		
1985–1986	Kansas City Comets (indoor)	19	(11)
1986	Tacoma Stars (indoor)	29	(22)
1986–1988	Baltimore Blast (indoor)	94	(52)
1987	Plymouth Argyle	6	(1)
1988	Bath City	0	(0)
1992	Detroit Rockers (indoor)		
- * Club domestic league appearances and goals

Keith Furphy (born 30 July 1958) is an English-American former professional footballer who played forward or winger, spending most of his career in the United States. He played four seasons in the North American Soccer League, seven in the Major Indoor Soccer League and one each in the American Soccer League and the National Professional Soccer League. Furphy also made six appearances in the Football League for Plymouth Argyle. He is the son of Ken Furphy, a former footballer and coach.

== Career ==
In 1978, Furphy moved to the United States where he signed with the Detroit Express of the North American Soccer League. At the time the Express was coached by his father. On 3 May 1980, the Express sent Furphy to the Atlanta Chiefs for cash and the Chiefs' first-round pick in the 1981 NASL Draft. The Express made the move as a result of fan dissatisfaction with Furphy playing for his father in Detroit. He spent two seasons with the Chiefs. In the fall of 1981, he signed with the Cleveland Force of the Major Indoor Soccer League and immediately established himself as a high-scoring indoor soccer striker. On 2 July 1983, Furphy signed with the Detroit Express, now playing in the second-division American Soccer League. He scored two goals in his debut the next day.

He returned to the Force in the fall and played with them through the 1984–85 season. However, tensions between him and coach Timo Liekoski came to a head that year and Furphy demanded to be traded. On 24 October 1985, the Force sent Furphy to the Kansas City Comets in exchange for the Comets' next three first-round draft choices. Furphy began the season with Kansas City, but was traded to the Tacoma Stars in exchange for Dale Mitchell on 6 February 1986. By this time, Furphy had become a naturalized U.S. citizen. Furphy finished the season in Tacoma, but was released by the team at the end of the season and signed with the Baltimore Blast. In 1987, Furphy returned to England to sign with Plymouth Argyle. He made six appearances in the Second Division of the Football League over a three-week period on the left wing and scored one goal. In the fall of 1988, he signed with Bath City and played one game, a 2–0 victory over Merthyr Tydfil in a November 1988 Westgate Insurance Cup game. On 22 February 1992, the Detroit Rockers of the National Professional Soccer League signed Furphy to a ten-day contract.
