= Mike Flater =

American soccer player

Personal information
- Full name: Michael Harold Flater
- Date of birth: January 22, 1950 (age 76)
- Place of birth: Evanston, Illinois, United States
- Height: 6 ft 0 in (1.83 m)
- Position: Forward

College career
Years	Team	Apps	(Gls)
- Colorado Mines Orediggers

Senior career*
Years	Team	Apps	(Gls)
1975	Denver Dynamos	15	(10)
1976–1977	Minnesota Kicks	28	(5)
1978	Oakland Stompers	4	(0)
1978–1980	Portland Timbers	24	(7)

International career
1975–1977	United States	15	(0)
- * Club domestic league appearances and goals

Mike Flater (born January 22, 1951, in Evanston, Illinois) is a retired U.S. soccer forward who spent six seasons in the North American Soccer League. He was also a member of the 1972 U.S.Olympic soccer team and earned fifteen caps with the U.S. national soccer team between 1975 and 1977.

== College ==
Flater attended the Colorado School of Mines. In addition to playing soccer, he also played as a placekicker on the school's football team. In 1973, he scored a 63-yard field goal. The Washington Redskins drafted Flater in the ninth round of the 1974 NFL draft.

== NASL ==
The San Jose Earthquakes of the North American Soccer League (NASL) drafted Flater in the 1974 NASL college draft. He did not sign with the Earthquakes, but in 1975 signed with the Denver Dynamos. That season, Flater scored ten goals in fifteen games with the Dynamos. At the end of the 1975 season, the Dynamos moved to Minnesota where the team was renamed the Minnesota Kicks. Flater made the move with the team and spent the next two seasons in Minnesota. However, his scoring pace dropped to one goal in twelve games in 1977 and he moved to the Oakland Stompers for the start of the 1978 season. He saw time in only four games with Oakland before being traded to the Portland Timbers. In twenty-two games with the Timbers, he scored seven goals as Portland went to the NASL semifinals. However, Flater suffered a major knee injury which put him out of the 1979 season. He attempted a comeback in 1980, but played only three games with the Timbers before retiring.

== National and Olympic Teams ==
In 1971, Flater joined the U.S. Olympic team as it began qualification for the 1972 Summer Olympics. A tie with El Salvador on September 18, 1971, put the U.S. into the games. However, the team tied once and lost twice, eliminating it from the tournament.

Flater made his debut with the U.S. national team in 1975. His first game came when he started a June 24, 1975, loss to Poland. His next game did not come until September 24, 1976. He then became a regular through the rest of the games in 1976 and 1977. His last match came on October 10, 1977, in a win over China. In fifteen matches with the U.S., Flater never scored a goal.
