= Dave Jokerst =

American soccer player

Personal information
- Date of birth: January 1, 1948 (age 78)
- Place of birth: St. Louis Missouri, U.S.
- Position: Goalkeeper

Senior career*
Years	Team	Apps	(Gls)
1969–1977	St. Louis Stars	28	(0)
1978–1979	California Surf	40	(0)
1979–1980	California Surf (indoor)	4	(0)
- * Club domestic league appearances and goals

Dave Jokerst is an American retired soccer goalkeeper who played in the North American Soccer League.
