= Detroit Express =

Defunct American soccer club

- Full name: Detroit Express
- Nickname(s): The Express
- Founded: 1978
- Dissolved: 1981; 44 years ago
- Stadium: Pontiac Silverdome
- Capacity: 80,000
- Chairman: Sonny VanArnem
- Coach: Ken Furphy
- League: NASL
Home colors	Away colors

The Detroit Express were a soccer team based in suburban Detroit that played in the now defunct North American Soccer League (NASL) from 1978 to 1980. Its home field was the Pontiac Silverdome. The Express were co-owned by Roger Faulkner, Sonny Van Arnem, Gary Lemmen and Jimmy Hill who was also the managing director and chairman of the English club Coventry City. The team was coached by Ken Furphy.

== History ==
=== 1978 ===
The Express were Detroit's first professional soccer team since the ASL's Detroit Mustangs disbanded in 1973, and the city's first NASL entry since the Detroit Cougars played their last season in 1968. The club made a splash by signing England forward Trevor Francis; he missed the first third of the season (arriving only after the European season ended in May), but still led the team with 22 goals and ten assists in 19 games. The coach's son, forward Keith Furphy, was second in scoring with 11 goals and 12 assists, while David Bradford and Alan Brazil added nine goals each. On July 12, Francis scored five times as the Express slaughtered the San Jose Earthquakes, 10–0, which as of 2021 is still the widest margin of victory in an American major pro soccer match (NASL or MLS). Detroit went on to win the NASL American Conference Central Division title with a 20–10 mark, and Francis had the only tally in a 1–0 defeat of the Philadelphia Fury in the first round of the playoffs. In the second round, the Express split a pair of games with Fort Lauderdale Strikers, but lost the mini-game immediately afterward, 1–0. Despite their on-field success, however, the Express were only mediocre at the box office, with an average attendance of 12,194, good enough for seventh place in the 24-team NASL but less than the league average of 13,084.

=== 1979 ===
Back in England, Francis made history as the first player in the UK to command a £1 million transfer when he was purchased by Nottingham Forest from Birmingham City, despite a bid from Jimmy Hill for Francis to split time between Coventry and the Express in a unique co-ownership agreement. Forest were not keen to allow their new asset to return to the United States, but they relented and Francis returned just past the midway point of the 1979 season. He drew large crowds and contributed 14 goals and 8 assists in 14 games, tying Keith Furphy for the team lead; Ted MacDougall added nine goals and 11 assists. But the Express struggled to a 14–16 season and a third-place finish. They were then swept out of the playoffs 2–0 in the first round by the Tampa Bay Rowdies. Despite the disappointment on the field, attendance improved at the cavernous Pontiac Silverdome, up to 14,058 per match, right around the NASL average of 14,201.

After 1979, though, Trevor Francis would not return to the NASL. Widely recognized as one of the finest forwards to play in the NASL, Francis notched 36 goals with 18 assists in just 33 regular-season matches—which placed him one spot ahead of Pelé on the all time NASL scoring list, despite playing 23 fewer games. (Francis also had three goals and three assists in five playoff games.) He was a first team all-star selection in 1978 and 1979 alongside Franz Beckenbauer, Giorgio Chinaglia, Johan Cruyff, Carlos Alberto and Rodney Marsh and other international greats, and the only Detroit player ever to be selected to the NASL first XI. Francis planned to return to the Silverdome in 1980 in an exhibition match between Nottingham Forest and the Express, but Francis was injured and the match was canceled. Finally, Francis returned to the Express (now in the American Soccer League) in 1981 for an exhibition game against the ASL All-Stars; the All-Stars won, 2–0, in front of 14,500 at the Silverdome.

=== 1979-80 ===
The Express headed indoors that winter to play in the 1979–80 NASL Indoor season. They had competition, as the Major Indoor Soccer League also decided to place a franchise in the Motor City: the Detroit Lightning. The Express managed a 7–5 record, third place in the Eastern Division and a playoff spot; unfortunately, the same Tampa Bay Rowdies that beat Detroit in the outdoor playoffs crushed them in the first round, 12–1, in St. Petersburg. (Tampa Bay would go on to beat Memphis to claim the championship.) Neither of Detroit's indoor soccer teams did much at the box office: The Express drew 3,937 fans per match at the Silverdome, while the Lightning could only manage 3,520 a game at Cobo Hall. (The Lightning would move to San Francisco and then Kansas City.)

=== 1980 ===
Without Francis, the Express slipped to a 14–18 mark, missing the playoffs by a single point (130-129 to the Houston Hurricane) and drawing only 11,198 a game—not all that bad by NASL standards, but not enough to pay the bills, either. Argentinian Pato Margetic was signed to replace Trevor Francis at the forward spot and he led the team with 11 goals and 11 assists. Gary Bannister and Adam Oates added 10 goals each, while Bradford finished with 16 assists. Wearing the number 10 shirt, David Bradford scored 14 goals and had 38 assists in his three years with the Express.

=== 1980-81 and transfer to Washington ===
The Express' second and last indoor season produced only a 7–11 record, and they missed the playoffs; the Express' last NASL contest was a 7-5 win over the Atlanta Chiefs in front of 5,598 at the Silverdome on February 15. (Their last games under the Express name came the following week, when they played a three-game money-raising tour in Guatemala.) Overall attendance improved to 4,761, a bit below league average and not enough to save the Express. In the spring of 1981, Jimmy Hill won a court battle to move the team to RFK Stadium to become the new Washington Diplomats, replacing the old franchise of that name which had folded. The Express-turned-Diplomats lasted just one season in D.C. before going out of business. Hill reportedly lost $2 million because of the failed venture, prompting his son to claim ''We've lost all the family money. All we have left is our home.''

=== Later years ===
The Detroit Express franchise was purchased and retained by local businessman Sonny Van Arnem, who started a new version of the Express in the second division American Soccer League for the 1981 season. The ASL version of the Express won the league title in 1982, but the league folded after the 1983 season. Van Arnem initially expressed enthusiasm for joining the ASL's successor, the United Soccer League, but he backed out of those plans when the league was not sanctioned by the USSF. The team was not able to find a home in another league and disbanded for good in 1984.

George Best also appeared for the Express during a tour of Europe in September 1978. Best played two games in Austria with the Express before the team headed to Switzerland.

== In popular culture ==
In the November 2009 episode of How I Met Your Mother called "Bagpipes", Ted wears an old Detroit Express shirt when trying to complain to his neighbors about their bagpiping.

Mac also wears a Detroit Express shirt in the Season 5 (2009) episode "The Gang Gives Frank an Intervention" of It's Always Sunny in Philadelphia.

== Year-by-year ==
Year	League	W	L	T	Pts	Reg. season	Playoffs	Avg. Attend.
1978	NASL	20	10			1st, American Conference, Central Division	Won 1st Round (Philadelphia); Lost Conference Semifinal (Ft. Lauderdale)	12,194
1979	NASL	14	16			3rd, American Conference, Central Division	Lost Conference Quarterfinal (Tampa Bay)	14,058
1979–80	NASL Indoor	7	5			3rd, Eastern Division	Lost 1st Round (Tampa Bay)	3,937
1980	NASL	14	18			3rd, American Conference, Central Division	did not qualify	11,198
1980–81	NASL Indoor	7	11			3rd, Central Division	did not qualify	4,761

== Honors ==
Division titles

- 1978 Central Division, American Conference

All-Star first team selections

- 1978 Trevor Francis
- 1979 Trevor Francis

Indoor All-Stars

- 1980–81 Pato Margetic

Indoor Soccer Hall of Fame

- 2014 Slobo Ilijevski
- 2019 Pato Margetic
