= David Irving (footballer) =

English football player and coach (born 1951)

Personal information
- Date of birth: 10 September 1951 (age 75)
- Place of birth: Workington, England
- Position: Striker

Senior career*
Years	Team	Apps	(Gls)
1970–1973	Workington	65	(16)
1973–1976	Everton	6	(0)
1975	→ Sheffield United (loan)	2	(0)
1976–1977	Oldham Athletic	19	(6)
1977–1978	Shamrock Rovers	15	(6)
1978–1980	Fort Lauderdale Strikers	72	(27)
1979–1980	Fort Lauderdale Strikers (indoor)	6	(5)
1980	Tulsa Roughnecks	7	(3)
1980	Atlanta Chiefs	11	(2)
1981	San Jose Earthquakes	15	(2)
1982	Oulun Palloseura	8	(2)
Total		226	(69)

Managerial career
- 1990–1991: Miami Freedom
- 1994: Carolina Vipers
- 1995: Myrtle Beach Boyz
- 1997: Myrtle Beach Seadawgs
- 1998–2014: Wilmington Hammerheads
- 2015–2016: Tulsa Roughnecks
- * Club domestic league appearances and goals

David Irving (born 10 September 1951) is an English football manager and former player who played as a forward.

== Playing career ==
Irving started his professional playing career with Workington AFC before signing for Everton in the old English Football League First Division for £30,000 – the highest youth transfer fee of the time. Later on he moved to Sheffield United on loan and Oldham Athletic. In the mid-1970s he crossed the Atlantic to play in the United States for the Fort Lauderdale Strikers (1977–83). Whilst with the Strikers, he played alongside such legendary players as Gordon Banks, Gerd Müller, Teófilo Cubillas and George Best. He also played against footballers like Pelé and Franz Beckenbauer. After Fort Lauderdale, he featured for other American teams such as the Tulsa Roughnecks, the San Jose Earthquakes and the Atlanta Chiefs.

He signed for Shamrock Rovers in October 1977. He made his debut on the 23rd at Milltown scoring against Drogheda United. He netted a hat trick at Galway on his fourth appearance and scored further goals against Home Farm and against St. Patrick's Athletic on his last appearance in the famous green and white Hoops. In total he played 16 times scoring six goals.

== Coaching career ==
After retiring from professional football, Irving earned himself an FA coaching badge. He began his managerial career with Oulun Palloseura where he was the player/assistant manager for a season. He moved back to the United States in 1989 when he joined the Fort Lauderdale Strikers (1988–94) as the assistant coach, helping the Strikers to the Pro Soccer League National Championship title in 1989.

In 1990, he became the head coach of the Miami Freedom of the American Professional Soccer League. That year the Freedom finished 8–12. He continued with the club into the 1991 season, but was fired after nine games with the team at 1–1–7 (win-draw-loss).

Irving was the head coach of the Carolina Vipers of the now defunct Continental Indoor Soccer League in 1994.

Irving was the head coach of the Myrtle Beach Boyz of the USL Second Division in 1995.

Irving was the head coach of the Myrtle Beach Seadawgs of the USL Second Division at the start of the 1997 season.

At the beginning of the 1998 season, Wilmington Hammerheads found themselves needing a new coach and managed to get Irving back into management. He brought success to the Hammerheads, winning them the USL Second Division title in 2003. He also tries to get English football clubs to play pre-season friendlies against Wilmington, most recently attracting Sunderland and Sheffield Wednesday. He has a good record at the club with 86 wins, 37 draws and just 12 defeats in eight seasons and has an excellent player recruitment track record, identifying many players from combines and try-outs. In the USL-Pro 2011 season he recruited five such players from combines in California as well as the 2011 USL-Pro 'Rookie of the Year' Luke Mulholland.
