= Mick Poole (footballer) =

English footballer

Personal information
- Full name: Michael David Poole
- Date of birth: 23 April 1955 (age 71)
- Place of birth: Morley, England
- Position: Goalkeeper

Senior career*
Years	Team	Apps	(Gls)
1973–1978	Rochdale	192	(0)
1974	→ Denver Dynamos (loan)	17	(0)
1977	→ Portland Timbers (loan)	21	(0)
1978–1980	Portland Timbers	80	(0)
1979–1980	Houston Summit (indoor)	18	(0)
1980–1981	Portland Timbers (indoor)	2	(0)
1980–1981	Baltimore Blast (indoor)	18	(0)
1981–1982	Rochdale	27	(0)
- * Club domestic league appearances and goals

Michael David Poole (born 23 April 1955) is an English retired football goalkeeper who played professionally in The Football League, North American Soccer League and Major Indoor Soccer League.

Poole began his career with Rochdale A.F.C. In 1974, the team sent the nineteen-year-old Poole on loan with the Denver Dynamos of the North American Soccer League. In 1977, they Rochdale loaned him to the Portland Timbers of the NASL before selling him to the Timbers in 1978. Poole played for the Timbers from 1978 to 1980. In the fall of 1979, he joined the Houston Summit of the Major Indoor Soccer League. In 1980, the NASL ran an indoor season and Poole began the indoor season with the Timbers before moving to the Baltimore Blast of the MISL for the end of the season. He returned to Rochdale in 1981.
