= Memphis Rogues =

Defunct American soccer club

- Full name: Memphis Rogues
- Nickname: Rogues
- Founded: 1978
- Dissolved: 1980
- Stadium: Liberty Bowl; Mid-South Coliseum (indoor)
- Capacity: 51,000
- Chairman: Beau Rogers; Avron Fogelman
- Coach: Malcolm Allison; Eddie McCreadie; Charlie Cooke
- League: North American Soccer League
| Home colors | Away colors |

The Memphis Rogues were a professional soccer team in the former North American Soccer League. They operated in the 1978, 1979, and 1980 seasons and played their home games in Memphis' Liberty Bowl Memorial Stadium. They also played indoor soccer at the Mid-South Coliseum during the 1979–80 season.

== History ==
In the mid-1970s, Harry T. Mangurian, Jr. and Beau Rogers joined forces to establish a new North American Soccer League (NASL) franchise. Mangurian owned a horse racing track in Florida, and Rogers was part-owner and general manager of the Tampa Bay Rowdies. As the two men searched for a city to serve as home for their new team, they looked at several locations in the southern U.S. – including New Orleans, Houston, Nashville and Atlanta – before settling on Memphis, Tennessee. Next, they decided to name the team the "Rogues" in part as an allusion to the Rowdies, as well as for a desire to have an elephant mascot (a "Rogue" elephant).

The team hired Malcolm Allison as its first coach. Allison came from Turkish powerhouse Galatasaray but his time in Memphis would be very short. Allison had achieved much controversy during his time in England, and when he had failed to sign a sufficient number of players for the inaugural season, he was dismissed without having coached a match and replaced by ex-Chelsea star Eddie McCreadie. The club finished the 1978 season in third place in its division and did not make the playoffs. Attendance averaged 8,708 a match, 17th in the 24-team league.

The second season, 1979, was disrupted by a players' strike which forced McCreadie out of retirement for a time. The team did worse on the pitch, finishing last, and worse at the box office, with 7,137 a match, with three teams doing worse.

The poor gates resulted in Mangurian and Rogers selling the team to Avron Fogelman in 1980. Fogelman owned a Memphis minor league baseball team and later became a part owner of the Kansas City Royals. Though attendance went up in 1980 to 9,864 a match, this was still 17th in the league and the team were again last in their division, though McCreadie's old Chelsea mate Charlie Cooke had taken over as coach.

The Rogues' last game ever came at Liberty Bowl Memorial Stadium against the Houston Hurricane. The Rogues won, 6–1. Tony Field scored the final goal in Memphis Rogues history. He beat the goalkeeper and walked the ball into the net. When he arrived at the goal line, he got down on his knees and headed the ball into the net. More skeptical fans and that the Rogues were mathematically eliminated from the playoffs and the Hurricane only need one goal to qualify, raised an eyebrow at the result. In the 1980 NASL goals of the year video, the Hurricanes are standing still, allowing Field to give the fans one last show.

In 1981, Fogelman cut his losses and sold the Rogues to Nelson Skalbania, a Canadian businessman who moved the team to Calgary, Alberta. Skalbania renamed the team the Calgary Boomers for the 1981, but the team lasted only one year in Calgary before folding.

=== Indoor success ===
The Rogues played the 1979–80 season of NASL indoor soccer at the Mid-South Coliseum. They posted a 9–3 regular-season record, won the Western Division, and went all the way to the finals, winning Game 1 of the series, 5–4, at home in front of 9,081 fans, before losing Game 2 and the mini-game tie-breaker to the Tampa Bay Rowdies at the Bayfront Center in St. Petersburg, Florida.

== Coaches ==
- Malcolm Allison 1978
- Eddie McCreadie 1978–1979
- Charlie Cooke 1980

== Year-by-year ==
| Year | League | W | L | Pts | Regular season | Playoffs |
|---|---|---|---|---|---|---|
| 1978 | NASL | 10 | 20 | 101 | 3rd, American Conference, Central Division | did not qualify |
| 1979 | NASL | 6 | 24 | 73 | 4th, American Conference, Central Division | did not qualify |
| 1979–80 | NASL Indoor | 9 | 3 | — | 1st, Western Division | Won Semifinal (Minnesota); Lost Championship (Tampa Bay) |
| 1980 | NASL | 14 | 18 | 126 | 4th, American Conference, Central Division | did not qualify |

== Honors ==
Championships

- NASL indoor: 1979–80 (finalists)

Regular Season/ Division Titles

- NASL indoor: 1979–80

Indoor Soccer Hall of Fame

- Mike Stankovic: 2013
