= United States men's national soccer team results (1970–1989) =

This is a compilation of every international soccer game played by the United States men's national soccer team from 1970 through 1989. It includes the team's record for that year, each game and the date played. It also lists the U.S. goal scorers.

The format is: home team listed first, U.S. listed first at home or neutral site.

Records are in win–loss–tie format. Games decided in penalty kicks are counted as ties, as per the FIFA standard.

== 1970 ==
Wins	Losses	Draws
0	0	0

== 1971 ==
Wins	Losses	Draws
0	0	0

== 1972 ==
Wins	Losses	Draws
0	3	1

Win Draw Loss

August 20 CONCACAF Championship Qualification	Canada	3–2	United States	St. John's, Canada
	Parsons 5'; Twamley 41'; Johnson 63'		Roy 65'; Getzinger 88'	Stadium: King George V Park; Attendance: 7,600; Referee: David Parsons (Bermuda)

August 29 CONCACAF Championship Qualification	United States	2–2	Canada	Baltimore, Maryland
	Roy 14'; Geimer 25'		Mackay 9'; Douglas 81'	Stadium: Memorial Stadium; Attendance: 3,273; Referee: Jose Roberto Henriquez (El Salvador)

September 3 CONCACAF Championship Qualification	Mexico	3–1	United States	Mexico City, Mexico
	Victorino 12'; Bustos 47'; Borja 60'		Roy 78'	Stadium: Estadio Azteca; Attendance: 29,891; Referee: Lloyd de Gourville (Trinidad and Tobago)

September 10 CONCACAF Championship Qualification	United States	1–2	Mexico	Los Angeles, California
	Geimer 8'		Ceballos 11'; Borbolla 48'	Stadium: Los Angeles Memorial Coliseum; Attendance: 9,260; Referee: Juan Soto Paris (Costa Rica)

== 1973 ==
Wins	Losses	Draws
3	9	0

Win Draw Loss

March 17 Friendly	Bermuda	4–0	United States	Hamilton, Bermuda
				Stadium: National Stadium; Attendance: 861

March 20 Friendly	Poland	4–0	United States	Łódź, Poland
	Lubanski 17', 24', 84'; Kasperczak 55'			Stadium: Stadion ŁKS; Attendance: 20,000; Referee: Heinz Einbeck (East Germany)

August 3 Friendly	United States	0–1	Poland	Chicago, Illinois
			Kasperczak 87'	Stadium: Soldier Field; Attendance: 12,000; Referee: John Davies (Canada)

August 5 Friendly	Canada	0–2	United States	Windsor, Canada
			Grgurev; Liveric	Stadium: Windsor Stadium; Attendance: 5,000; Referee: Willian Gallacher (Canada)

August 10 Friendly	United States	0–4	Poland	San Francisco, California
			Kmiecik 36', 47'; Szarmach 72'; Kasztelan 88'	Stadium: Candlestick Park; Attendance: 30,000; Referee: Toros Kibritjian (United States)

August 12 Friendly	United States	1–0	Poland	New Britain, Connecticut
	Trost 37'			Stadium: Willow Brook Park Stadium; Attendance: 10,000; Referee: Roger Schott (United States)

September 9 Friendly	United States	1–0	Bermuda	Hartford, Connecticut
	Brewster			Stadium: Dillon Stadium; Attendance: 4,200

October 16 Friendly	Mexico	2–0	United States	Mexico City, Mexico
	Victorino 31'; Bustos 46'			Stadium: Estadio Azteca; Attendance: 14,000; Referee: Marco Dorantes (Mexico)

November 3 Friendly	Haiti	1–0	United States	Port-au-Prince, Haiti
				Stadium: Stade Sylvio Cator; Attendance: 22,000

November 5 Friendly	Haiti	1–0	United States	Port-au-Prince, Haiti
				Stadium: Stade Sylvio Cator; Attendance: 18,000

November 13 Friendly	Israel	3–1	United States	Tel Aviv, Israel
	Peretz 9'; Rozen 41'; Macmel 46'		Roy 13'	Stadium: Bloomfield Stadium; Attendance: 5,000; Referee: Menachem Ashkenazi (Israel)

November 15 Friendly	Israel	2–0	United States	Beersheba, Israel
	Damti 12'; Peretz 15'			Stadium: Municipal Stadium; Attendance: 3,000; Referee: Yosef Finkelstein (Israel)

== 1974 ==
Wins	Losses	Draws
0	2	0

Win Draw Loss

September 5 Friendly	Mexico	3–1	United States	Monterrey, Mexico
	González 66'; Salgado 79', 80'		Vaninger 48'	Stadium: Estadío Universitario; Attendance: 25,000; Referee: Werner Winsemann (Canada)

September 8 Friendly	United States	0–1	Mexico	Irving, Texas
			Trujillo 36'	Stadium: Texas Stadium; Attendance: 22,164

== 1975 ==
Wins	Losses	Draws
0	5	0

Win Draw Loss

March 26 Friendly	Poland	7–0	United States	Poznań, Poland
	Lato 12', 51'; Szarmach 19', 43'; Deyna 32', 67', 71'			Stadium: Warta Stadion; Attendance: 10,000; Referee: Zdenek Jelinek (Czechoslovakia)

June 24 Friendly	United States	0–4	Poland	Seattle, Washington
			Bula 13'; Lato 38'; Szarmach 70'; Wyrobek 89'	Stadium: Memorial Stadium; Attendance: 13,195; Referee: Dante Maglio (Canada)

August 19 Friendly	United States	1–3	Costa Rica	Mexico City, Mexico
	McCully			Stadium: Estadio Azteca; Attendance: 1,000

August 21 Friendly	United States	0–6	Argentina	Mexico City, Mexico
			Ardiles; Cardenas; Coscia; Valencia	Stadium: Estadio Azteca; Attendance: 1,500

August 24 Friendly	Mexico	2–0	United States	Mexico City, Mexico
	Borja 44'; Delgado 66'			Stadium: Estadio Azteca; Referee: Arturo Yamasaki (Peru)

== 1976 ==
Wins	Losses	Draws
1	2	5

Win Draw Loss

September 24 CONCACAF Championship Qualification	Canada	1–1	United States	Vancouver, Canada
	Bolitho 77'		Bandov 8'	Stadium: Empire Stadium; Attendance: 15,543; Referee: Marco Dorantes (Mexico)

October 3 CONCACAF Championship Qualification	United States	0–0	Mexico	Los Angeles, California
				Stadium: Los Angeles Memorial Coliseum; Attendance: 31,171; Referee: Dante Maglio (Canada)

October 15 CONCACAF Championship Qualification	Mexico	3–0	United States	Puebla, Mexico
	Solís 28'; Damián 40'; Dávila 83' (pen.)			Stadium: Estadio Cuauhtémoc; Attendance: 35,000; Referee: Werner Winsemann (Canada)

October 20 CONCACAF Championship Qualification	United States	2–0	Canada	Seattle, Washington
	Rys 55'; Veee 81'			Stadium: Kingdome; Attendance: 17,675; Referee: Rubío Vasquez (Mexico)

November 10 Friendly	Haiti	0–0	United States	Port-au-Prince, Haiti
				Stadium: Stade Sylvio Cator

November 12 Friendly	Haiti	0–0	United States	Port-au-Prince, Haiti
				Stadium: Stade Sylvio Cator

November 14 Friendly	Haiti	0–0	United States	Port-au-Prince, Haiti
				Stadium: Stade Sylvio Cator

December 22 CONCACAF Championship Playoff	United States	0–3	Canada	Port-au-Prince, Haiti
			Budd 21'; Lenarduzzi 80'; Bolitho 87'	Stadium: Stade Sylvio Cator; Attendance: 32,869; Referee: Guillermo Velasquez (Colombia)

== 1977 ==
Wins	Losses	Draws
3	3	2

Win Draw Loss

September 15 Friendly	El Salvador	1–2	United States	San Salvador, El Salvador
			Davis; Villa	Stadium: Estadio Cuscatlán; Attendance: 55,000

September 18 Friendly	Guatemala	3–1	United States	Guatemala City, Guatemala
			Bellinger	Stadium: Estadio Mateo Flores

September 25 Friendly	Guatemala	2–0	United States	Guatemala City, Guatemala
				Stadium: Estadio Mateo Flores

September 27 Friendly	Mexico	3–0	United States	Monterrey, Mexico
	Cuéllar 12'; Jiménez 57'; Ortega 79'			Stadium: Estadio Universitario; Attendance: 20,000; Referee: Mauricio Regalado (Guatemala)

September 30 Friendly	United States	0–0	El Salvador	Monterey Park, California
				Stadium: ELAC Stadium; Attendance: 15,000

October 6 Friendly	United States	1–1	China	Washington, D.C.
	Villa			Stadium: RFK Stadium; Attendance: 8,366

October 10 Friendly	United States	1–0	China	Atlanta, Georgia
	Pereira			Stadium: Atlanta–Fulton County Stadium; Attendance: 15,000

October 16 Friendly	United States	2–1	China	San Francisco, California
	Nanchoff; Villa			Stadium: Kezar Stadium; Attendance: 15,000

== 1978 ==
Wins	Losses	Draws
0	2	1

Win Draw Loss

September 3 Friendly	Iceland	0–0	United States	Reykjavík, Iceland
				Stadium: Laugardalsvöllur; Attendance: 2,500; Referee: Rolf Haugen (Norway)

September 6 Friendly	Switzerland	2–0	United States	Lucerne, Switzerland
	Elsener; Schnyder			Stadium: Stadion Allmend; Attendance: 6,500; Referee: Jaromír Fausek (Czechoslovakia)

September 20 Friendly	Portugal	1–0	United States	Setúbal, Portugal
	Costa 31'			Stadium: Estádio do Bonfim; Attendance: 5,000; Referee: Inacio de Almeida (Portugal)

== 1979 ==
Wins	Losses	Draws
2	5	0

Win Draw Loss

February 3 Friendly	United States	1–3	Soviet Union	Seattle, Washington
	Davis			Stadium: Kingdome; Attendance: 13,317

February 11 Friendly	United States	1–4	Soviet Union	San Francisco, California
	Liveric			Stadium: Candlestick Park; Attendance: 7,213

May 7 Friendly	United States	0–6	France	East Rutherford, New Jersey
		Report	Lacombe 8', 14', 37'; Droege 42' (o.g.); Amisse 61'; Six 73'	Stadium: Giants Stadium; Attendance: 20,591; Referee: Marco Dorantes (Mexico)

October 7 Friendly	Bermuda	1–3	United States	Hamilton, Bermuda
			Makowski; Liveric; Bandov	Stadium: National Stadium

October 10 Friendly	France	3–0	United States	Paris, France
	Platini 5'; Wagner 18'; Amisse 23'	Report		Stadium: Parc des Princes; Attendance: 25,000; Referee: Hendrik van Ettekoven (Netherlands)

October 26 Friendly	Hungary	0–2	United States	Budapest, Hungary
			Nanchoff; DiBernardo	Stadium: Népstadion; Attendance: 5,000; Referee: Heinz Fahnler (Austria)

October 29 Friendly	Republic of Ireland	3–2	United States	Dublin, Ireland
	Grealish 64'; Givens 66'; Anderson 68'		DiBernardo 11'; Villa 63'	Stadium: Dalymount Park; Attendance: 23,000; Referee: Éamonn Farrell (Republic of Ireland)

== 1980 ==
Wins	Losses	Draws
2	2	2

Win Draw Loss

October 4 Friendly	Luxembourg	0–2	United States	Dudelange, Luxembourg
			Hulcer; Davis (pen.)	Stadium: Stade Jos Nosbaum; Attendance: 1,600; Referee: Gerd Hennig (West Germany)

October 7 Friendly	Portugal	1–1	United States	Lisbon, Portugal
	Manuel 65'		Davis 67'	Stadium: Estádio do Restelo; Attendance: 15,000; Referee: José Luis García (Spain)

October 25 CONCACAF Championship qualification	United States	0–0	Canada	Fort Lauderdale, Florida
				Stadium: Lockhart Stadium; Attendance: 7,864; Referee: Tomas García (El Salvador)

November 1 CONCACAF Championship qualification	Canada	2–1	United States	Vancouver, Canada
	Iarusci 21'; Segota 42' (pen.)		Villa 90'	Stadium: Empire Stadium; Attendance: 13,598; Referee: Rómulo Méndez (Guatemala)

November 9 CONCACAF Championship qualification	Mexico	5–1	United States	Mexico City, Mexico
	Sánchez 24'; Camacho 31', 55'; Mendizabal 37'; González 40'		Davis 76' (pen.)	Stadium: Estadio Azteca; Attendance: 90,000; Referee: Jose Valverde (Costa Rica)

November 23 CONCACAF Championship qualification	United States	2–1	Mexico	Fort Lauderdale, Florida
	Moyers 31', 65'		Sánchez 40'	Stadium: Lockhart Stadium; Attendance: 2,126; Referee: Marcio Gracias (Guatemala)

== 1981 ==
Wins	Losses	Draws
0	0	0

== 1982 ==
Wins	Losses	Draws
1	0	0

Win Draw Loss

March 21 Friendly	Trinidad and Tobago	1–2	United States	Port of Spain, Trinidad and Tobago
			Veee; Davis	Stadium: Queen's Park Oval; Referee: Osmond Downer (Trinidad and Tobago)

== 1983 ==
Wins	Losses	Draws
1	0	0

Win Draw Loss

April 8 Friendly	Haiti	0–2	United States	Port-au-Prince, Haiti
			Durgan; Borja	Stadium: Stade Sylvio Cator

== 1984 ==
Wins	Losses	Draws
3	2	4

Win Draw Loss

May 30 Friendly	United States	0–0	Italy	East Rutherford, New Jersey
				Stadium: Giants Stadium; Attendance: 31,310; Referee: Marco Dorantes (Mexico)

September 29 CONCACAF Championship Qualification	Netherlands Antilles	0–0	United States	Willemstad, Curaçao
				Stadium: Ergilio Hato Stadium; Attendance: 6,109; Referee: Jacques Goede (Suriname)

October 6 CONCACAF Championship Qualification	United States	4–0	Netherlands Antilles	St. Louis, Missouri
	DiBernardo 50'; Coker 58', 67'; Kapp 85'			Stadium: Busch Stadium; Attendance: 10,718; Referee: Rolando Fusco (Canada)

October 9 Friendly	United States	3–1	El Salvador	Los Angeles, California
	Hooker; Davis; LaDouceur		Rivas	Stadium: Los Angeles Memorial Coliseum; Attendance: 27,000; Referee: Marco Dorantes (Mexico)

October 11 Friendly	United States	1–0	Colombia	Los Angeles, California
	Coker			Stadium: Los Angeles Memorial Coliseum; Attendance: 26,000

October 14 Friendly	Guatemala	4–0	United States	Guatemala City, Guatemala
				Stadium: Estadio Mateo Flores; Attendance: 26,000; Referee: JE Melendez Gonzalez (Guatemala)

October 17 Friendly	Mexico	2–1	United States	Ciudad Nezahualcóyotl, Mexico
	Juárez 39'; Farfán 65'		Van der Beck 61'	Stadium: Estadio Neza 86

November 30 Friendly	United States	0–0	Ecuador	Hempstead, New York
				Stadium: Hofstra Stadium

December 2 Friendly	United States	2–2	Ecuador	Miami, Florida
	Sharp; LaDouceur		Cuvi; Benítez	Stadium: Orange Bowl; Attendance: 4,000

== 1985 ==
Wins	Losses	Draws
2	3	3

Win Draw Loss

February 8 Friendly	United States	1–1	Switzerland	Tampa, Florida
20:00 EST (UTC−5)	Van der Beck 52'	Report	Hermann 10'	Stadium: Pepin-Rood Stadium; Attendance: 3,500; Referee: Marco Dorantes (Mexico)

April 2 Friendly	Canada	2–0	United States	Vancouver, Canada
	Vrablic 68', 80'			Stadium: BC Place; Attendance: 9,150; Referee: Robert Allen (Canada)

April 4 Friendly	United States	1–1	Canada	Portland, Oregon
	Pérez		Pakos	Stadium: Civic Stadium; Attendance: 4,181

May 15 CONCACAF Championship	United States	2–1	Trinidad and Tobago	St. Louis, Missouri
	Borja 24'; Peterson 89'		Fonrose 19'	Stadium: Busch Stadium; Attendance: 15,183; Referee: Robert Allen (Canada)

May 19 CONCACAF Championship	United States	1–0	Trinidad and Tobago	Torrance, California
	Caligiuri 15'			Stadium: Murdock Stadium; Attendance: 6,115; Referee: Jorge Leanza (Mexico)

May 26 CONCACAF Championship	Costa Rica	1–1	United States	Alajuela, Costa Rica
	Ramírez 42'		Kerr, Jr. 44'	Stadium: Estadio Alejandro Morera Soto; Attendance: 20,173; Referee: Joaquin Urrea (Mexico)

May 31 CONCACAF Championship	United States	0–1	Costa Rica	Torrance, California
			Coronado 35'	Stadium: Murdock Stadium; Attendance: 11,800; Referee: John Meachin (Canada)

June 16 Friendly	United States	0–5	England	Los Angeles, California
		Report	Lineker 13', 47'; Dixon 30', 73'; Steven 81'	Stadium: Los Angeles Memorial Coliseum; Attendance: 10,145; Referee: Edgardo Codesal (Mexico)

== 1986 ==
Wins	Losses	Draws
0	0	2

Win Draw Loss

February 5 Friendly	United States	0–0	Canada	Miami, Florida
				Stadium: Orange Bowl; Attendance: 5,182; Referee: Marco Dorantes (Mexico)

February 7 Friendly	United States	1–1	Uruguay	Miami, Florida
	Murray		Aguilera	Stadium: Orange Bowl; Attendance: 15,852; Referee: Marco Dorantes (Mexico)

== 1987 ==
Wins	Losses	Draws
1	2	0

Win Draw Loss

June 8 President's Cup	United States	1–3	Egypt	Seoul, South Korea
	Hantak			Stadium: Dongdaemun Stadium

June 12 President's Cup	South Korea	1–0	United States	Busan, South Korea
	Choi Sang-kook 31'			Stadium: Busan Gudeok Stadium; Referee: Masahiro Sokawa (Japan)

June 16 President's Cup	United States	1–0	Thailand	Cheongju, South Korea
	Hantak			Stadium: Cheongju Stadium

== 1988 ==
Wins	Losses	Draws
3	7	3

Win Draw Loss

January 10 Friendly	Guatemala	1–0	United States	Guatemala City, Guatemala
				Stadium: Estadio Mateo Flores; Referee: Mendizabal Euceda (Guatemala)

January 13 Friendly	Guatemala	0–1	United States	Guatemala City, Guatemala
			Agoos	Stadium: Estadio Mateo Flores; Referee: Burgos Escobar (Guatemala)

May 14 Friendly	United States	0–2	Colombia	Miami, Florida
			Iguarán	Stadium: Orange Bowl; Attendance: 15,371; Referee: Angelo Bratsis (United States)

June 1 Friendly	United States	1–1	Chile	Stockton, California
	Eichmann		Basay	Stadium: Stagg Memorial Stadium

June 3 Friendly	United States	1–3	Chile	San Diego, California
	Borja		Rojas; Hurtado; Salgado	Stadium: Aztec Bowl

June 5 Friendly	United States	0–3	Chile	Fresno, California
			Hurtado; Salgado	Stadium: Bulldog Stadium

June 7 Friendly	United States	0–1	Ecuador	Albuquerque, New Mexico
				Stadium: University Stadium; Referee: Arturo Angeles (United States)

June 10 Friendly	United States	0–2	Ecuador	Houston, Texas
				Stadium: Delmar Stadium; Referee: Julio Salas (United States)

June 12 Friendly	United States	0–0	Ecuador	Fort Worth, Texas
				Stadium: Herman Clark Stadium; Attendance: 7,250

June 14 Friendly	United States	1–0	Costa Rica	San Antonio, Texas
	Ryerson			Referee: Edward Bellion (United States)

July 13 Friendly	United States	0–2	Poland	New Britain, Connecticut
			Kosecki 44', 53'	Stadium: Veterans Stadium; Attendance: 10,213; Referee: Gordon Arrowsmith (Canada)

July 24 CONCACAF Championship qualification	Jamaica	0–0	United States	Kingston, Jamaica
				Stadium: Independence Park; Attendance: 15,000; Referee: Julio López (Honduras)

August 13 CONCACAF Championship qualification	United States	5–1	Jamaica	Fenton, Missouri
	Bliss 18'; Pérez 69' (pen.); Klopas 76', 85'; Krumpe 78'		Sterling 54'	Stadium: St. Louis Soccer Park; Attendance: 6,100; Referee: David Brummitt (Canada)

== 1989 ==
Wins	Losses	Draws
6	3	3

Win Draw Loss

April 16 CONCACAF Championship	Costa Rica	1–0	United States	San José, Costa Rica
	Rhoden 14'			Stadium: Estadio Nacional; Attendance: 26,271; Referee: José Antonio Garza (Mexico)

April 30 CONCACAF Championship	United States	1–0	Costa Rica	Fenton, Missouri
	Ramos 72'			Stadium: St. Louis Soccer Park; Attendance: 8,500; Referee: Rodolfo Méndez (Honduras)

May 13 CONCACAF Championship	United States	1–1	Trinidad and Tobago	Torrance, California
	Trittschuh 48'		Charles 88'	Stadium: Murdock Stadium; Attendance: 10,000; Referee: Luigi Agnolin (Italy)

June 4 Marlboro Cup	United States	3–0	Peru	East Rutherford, New Jersey
	Bliss 14'; Ramos 19'; Murray 44'			Stadium: Giants Stadium; Attendance: 33,133

June 17 CONCACAF Championship	United States	2–1	Guatemala	New Britain, Connecticut
	Murray 3'; Eichmann 67'		Chacón 22'; Funes (red card) 86'	Stadium: Veterans Stadium; Attendance: 10,516; Referee: Gordon Arrowsmith (Canada)

June 24 Friendly	United States	0–1	Colombia	Miami, Florida
			Valderrama	Stadium: Orange Bowl; Attendance: 15,233; Referee: Angelo Bratsis (United States)

August 13 Marlboro Cup	United States	1–2	South Korea	Los Angeles, California
	Harkes 63'		Banks 17' (o.g.); Hwang 21'	Stadium: Los Angeles Memorial Coliseum; Attendance: 23,191

September 17 CONCACAF Championship	El Salvador	0–1	United States	Tegucigalpa, Honduras
			Pérez 61'	Stadium: Estadio Nacional; Attendance: 3,700; Referee: Edgardo Codesal (Mexico)

October 8 CONCACAF Championship	Guatemala	0–0	United States	Guatemala City, Guatemala
				Stadium: Estadio Mateo Flores; Attendance: 8,000; Referee: Elías Jácome (Ecuador)

November 5 CONCACAF Championship	United States	0–0	El Salvador	Fenton, Missouri
				Stadium: St. Louis Soccer Park; Attendance: 8,500; Referee: John Meachin (Canada)

November 14 Friendly	United States	2–1	Bermuda	Cocoa, Florida
	Doyle; Eichmann			Stadium: Cocoa Expo Sports Center

November 19 CONCACAF Championship	Trinidad and Tobago	0–1	United States	Port of Spain, Trinidad and Tobago
			Caligiuri 30'	Stadium: National Stadium; Attendance: 35,000; Referee: Juan Carlos Loustau (Argentina)
