= Mowlik =

Mowlik may refer to:

- Mowlik (surname)
- Mowlik-e Olya, village in northwestern Iran
