= Okęcie incident =

Polish football incident

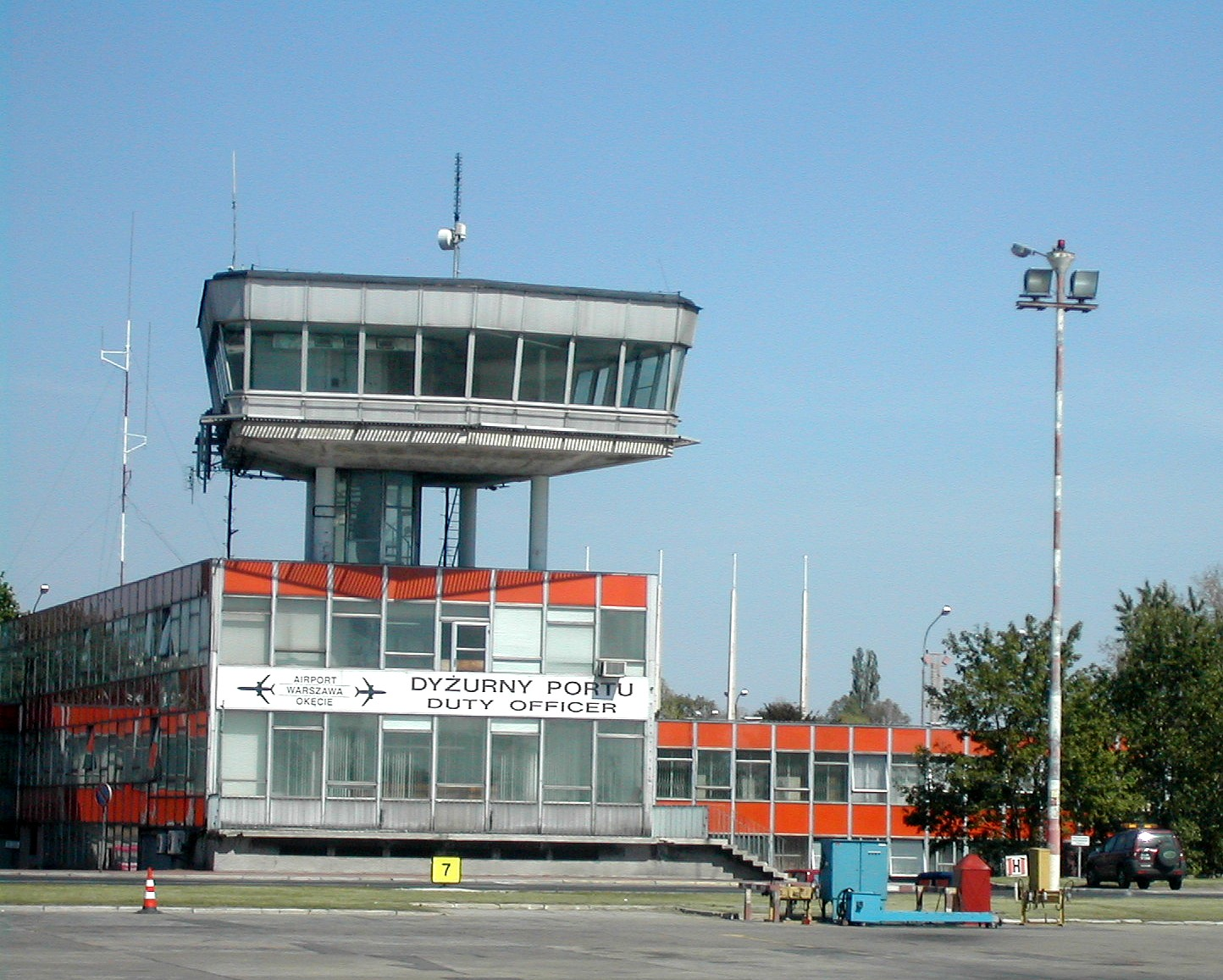
Okęcie Airport's 1960s terminal buildings, the site of the incident's climax (2003 photograph)

The Okęcie incident (Polish: Afera na Okęciu) was a dispute between players and technical staff of the Poland national football team on 29 November 1980, starting at the team hotel in Warsaw and climaxing at Okęcie Airport. As an incident of insubordination, when strikes and other forms of civil resistance were intensifying in communist Poland, it caused a domestic press storm, and led to the suspension of several prominent players and the resignation of Ryszard Kulesza, the team manager.

Józef Młynarczyk, the team's goalkeeper, was hung over when the time came to leave the hotel for the airport, having not slept following a night on the town with a friend. Kulesza and one of his assistants, Bernard Blaut, decided to leave Młynarczyk behind, much to the indignation of some of the players, including Stanisław Terlecki, Zbigniew Boniek, Włodzimierz Smolarek, and Władysław Żmuda. Terlecki, who held pro-Western political views and had publicly criticized the communist authorities, was particularly angered and drove Młynarczyk to the airport, where the players continued their protests. Kulesza eventually relented and allowed Młynarczyk to travel with the team.

The Polish media took hold of the story and over the following days, vociferously attacked the rebellious players. Meanwhile, Terlecki again defied the communist authorities by arranging for the players to meet Pope John Paul II. The Polish Football Association sent Terlecki, Młynarczyk, Boniek, and Żmuda home and imposed various bans preventing them from playing at the international and club level, over the next year. Terlecki and Boniek, in particular, were condemned by the association as insubordinate "rabble-rousers". Smolarek received a more modest, suspended ban. Kulesza resigned in protest at the sanctions imposed on the players, saying they were too harsh. Most of the banned players were reinstated during 1981, but Terlecki was not. He emigrated to the United States in June of that year and, although he returned home five years later, he never played for Poland again.

== Background ==
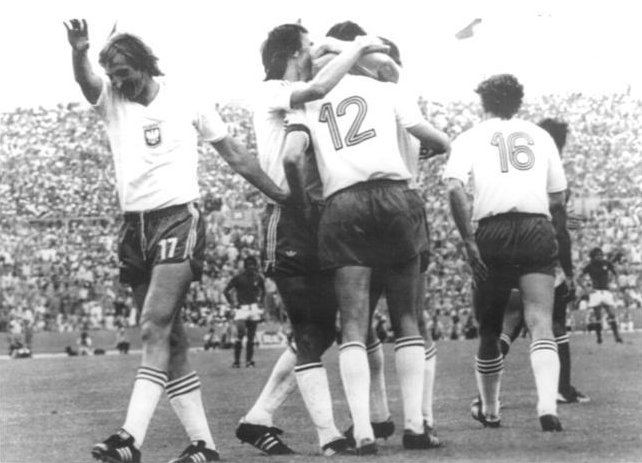
Poland football players at the 1974 FIFA World Cup in West Germany

In June 1976, a series of protests took place across communist Poland, soon after the government announced plans to sharply increase the fixed prices charged nationwide for many basic commodities. Violent incidents occurred in Płock, Radom, and Ursus, as the protests were forcibly put down and the planned price hikes were cancelled. These demonstrations and the events surrounding them brought the Polish workforce and intellectual political opposition together, and by 1980, a campaign of civil resistance for political change was strongly intensifying. Industrial strike action in Lublin in July 1980 (the so-called Lublin July) preceded formation of Solidarity (Solidarność) in the port city of Gdańsk, during the following months. This was the first non-communist trade union in an Eastern Bloc country. The government took several steps to obstruct Solidarity's emergence, enforcing press censorship and cutting off telephone connections between the coast and the hinterland, but despite these efforts, by late 1980, four out of every five Polish workers were members of the union.

Poland's national football team, managed by Ryszard Kulesza, was then regarded as one of the world's best, having finished third at the 1974 FIFA World Cup. In November 1980, it was ranked sixth in the world by the Elo rating system. Later that month, the team was preparing for a 1982 World Cup qualifying match away against Malta on 7 December. The squad's departure was scheduled for 29 November, ten days before the game, so the players could attend a training camp in Italy, then contest a warm-up match against a team representing the Italian league.

One of Poland's key players at the time was Stanisław Terlecki, a forward whose club was ŁKS Łódź. The son of university lecturers, Terlecki held a degree in history from the University of Łódź, as well as fervent anti-communist political views and a strident attitude regarding their display. He was known for openly mocking the establishment with subversive abandon, and regularly made jokes in public about communist authority figures and organisations, prompting the ire of the Polish Football Association (PZPN) and the Warsaw police force. The first Polish international player with a university degree in anything other than physical education, he eschewed the Polish sports magazines read by many of his teammates on road trips in favour of Western news journals, such as Newsweek and Time. Like many Polish intellectuals, he sympathised with movements such as Solidarity; following their example, he twice attempted to unionise Polish footballers during the late 1970s. The PZPN blocked both attempts, banning Terlecki from all organised football each time; first for six months, then for a year.

== Incident ==
=== Main incident ===
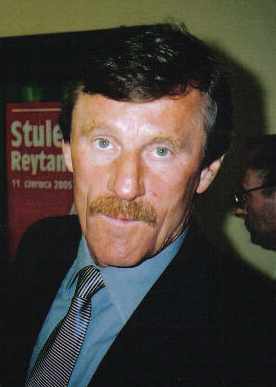
Józef Młynarczyk, the team's goalkeeper, whose alleged drunkenness sparked the dispute

Late on 28 November 1980, the night before the team's departure from Warsaw for Italy, goalkeeper Józef Młynarczyk and forward Włodzimierz Smolarek, both of Widzew Łódź, left the Hotel Vera without permission. According to Smolarek they did this to get some dinner because they did not like the food at the hotel. They met a friend of Młynarczyk's, sports journalist Wojciech Zieliński, at the Adria nightclub. According to Andrzej Iwan, another member of the team, the main topic of conversation was Zieliński's estranged wife, who had been caught prostituting herself around Warsaw, and had since moved to Italy. Several Poland players knew her, and Młynarczyk had just been to Italy to play for Widzew Łódź against Juventus. According to Iwan, the journalist encouraged Młynarczyk to drink as they talked, hoping the goalkeeper might have news of her. Smolarek left the club around 02:00, but Młynarczyk and Zieliński stayed until about three hours later.

A senior national team official, Colonel Roman Lisiewicz of the Polish Army, said he saw the goalkeeper and the journalist reach the hotel in a taxi soon after 05:00, but rather than going to his room Młynarczyk left again with Zieliński before returning around 07:00. Tired and hungover, Młynarczyk joined the rest of the players for breakfast, and according to Terlecki spent most of the meal getting worked up about possible managerial retribution. Młynarczyk was in such bad shape that he was unable to carry his own bags; Smolarek took them for him. Next to the team bus, one of Kulesza's assistants, Bernard Blaut, confronted Smolarek and told him Młynarczyk was to stay behind.

Smolarek, Terlecki and two other Polish players – Zbigniew Boniek and Władysław Żmuda, both of Widzew Łódź – angrily objected and nearly came to blows with Blaut. Grzegorz Lato, one of the team's forwards, did not join the protest but later said he had not thought Młynarczyk drunk enough to warrant exclusion. The team eventually left without Terlecki or Młynarczyk. Terlecki, whose own car was on hand, drove himself and Młynarczyk to the airport, where the confrontation continued.

Terlecki attempted to prevent journalists at the airport from photographing Młynarczyk, taking cameras and microphones from some reporters during the confrontation. Meanwhile, the other players attempted to talk Kulesza around, telling him Młynarczyk had serious personal problems. Kulesza eventually relented and allowed the goalkeeper to travel with the team.

=== Press storm; players meet the Pope ===
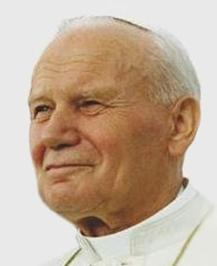
Pope John Paul II, himself Polish, met the Poland team at the request of Stanisław Terlecki, one of the players.

Among the journalists at the airport were Jacek Gucwa of Polish Television, Bogdan Chruścicki of Polish Radio, and Remigiusz Hetman of the weekly football journal Piłka Nożna. News about the incident quickly spread across the country, partly because of Terlecki's outlandish actions in the reporters' presence. Iwan later reflected that Terlecki had "made so much commotion it was impossible to sweep everything under the carpet". Boniek corroborates this version of events: "Terlecki was massively to blame. He brought Młynarczyk to the airport in his own car, then pulled the plug powering a TV camera out of the wall." Grzegorz Majchrzak, a historian of the Polish Institute of National Remembrance, questions Boniek's words, positing that he might have distorted events in an attempt to distance himself from Terlecki.

The scandal received extensive coverage in the state-controlled media during a period of strikes and other industrial action in Poland. A number of journalists attacked the players who had supported Młynarczyk; the Przegląd Sportowy sports magazine ran the headline "No Mercy for Those Guilty of the Scandal at the Airport" while Tempo, another journal, was similarly severe, proclaiming "This Cannot Be Tolerated". Piłka Nożna condemned the "magnificent men ... who think they can do what they want", but at the same time questioned the conduct of the team's non-playing staff.

In the Italian capital, Terlecki continued to disregard the authorities' instructions. The players were under strict instructions not to associate with the Vatican while in Rome, but Terlecki arranged for them to meet Pope John Paul II, who was himself Polish. Seeing this as a second act of defiance, the PZPN promptly sent Terlecki, Młynarczyk, Boniek and Żmuda home, escorted by General Marian Ryba of the Polish Army, who was also the football association president. Lech Poznań's Piotr Mowlik replaced Młynarczyk for the match against Malta, which Poland won 2–0.

== Aftermath ==
=== Hearings and suspensions ===
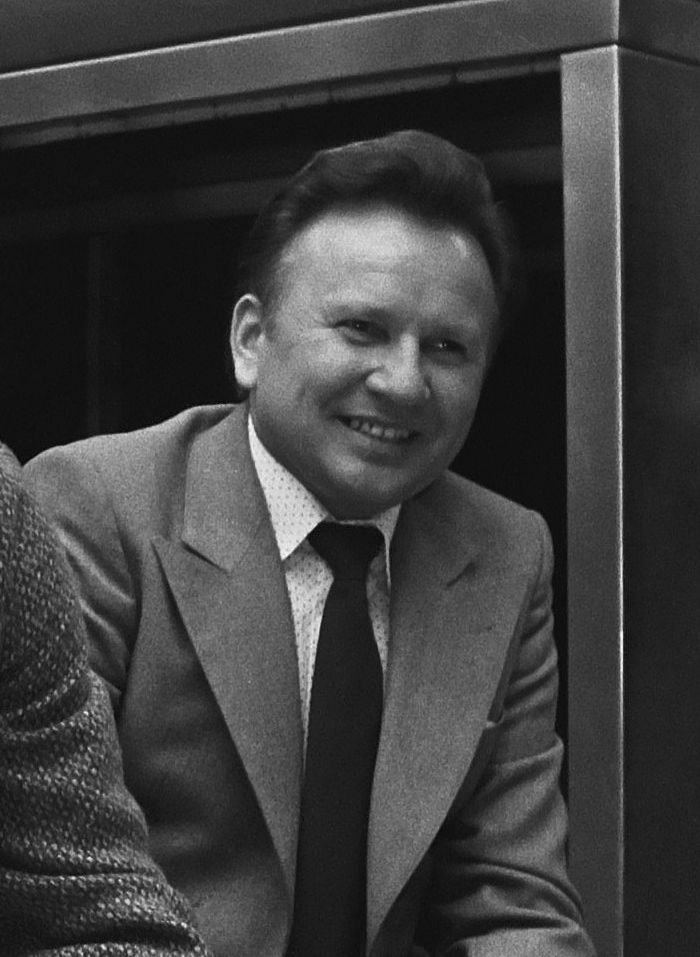
Ryszard Kulesza, the team manager

Ryba announced on 1 December 1980 that he intended to bar the dissenting players from the Poland squad. When the rest of the team returned to Poland, Terlecki once again attempted to form a footballers' union. Securing the support of 16 other Poland international players, he wrote a letter to the PZPN declaring their intention to do so, leading the authorities to order them to face a tribunal. Only Terlecki, Boniek, Żmuda and Młynarczyk continued to endorse the letter when challenged in court.

On 15 December, PZPN officials attempted to reconstruct the night's events, asking various players and staff to give accounts of what had happened. Several journalists were present. The stories told contradicted each other in several places, notably regarding how much Młynarczyk had had to drink. The team's technical staff said he had been obviously intoxicated when they had seen him, while the goalkeeper insisted he had taken only "three glasses of champagne and a sip of beer" with his friend. Another point of contention regarded the conversation at the airport, which had caused Kulesza to yield. It was generally agreed that the players had talked the manager around by telling him Młynarczyk had personal problems, but the non-playing staff now accused them of emotional blackmail. The players said their intention had been to explain the goalkeeper's off-field issues to help the manager make a more informed decision.

Terlecki's answers at this meeting under the questioning of General Ryba, a former military prosecutor, were typically provocative; when the general asked what time Terlecki had left the hotel on 29 November, the ŁKS forward said 08:00. "Are you sure it was 08:00?" Ryba pressed – "Are you sure it wasn't 08:02?" The player replied that he was not: "No. Maybe it was even 08:03. I don't know this time exactly, because I have one of your Russian watches."

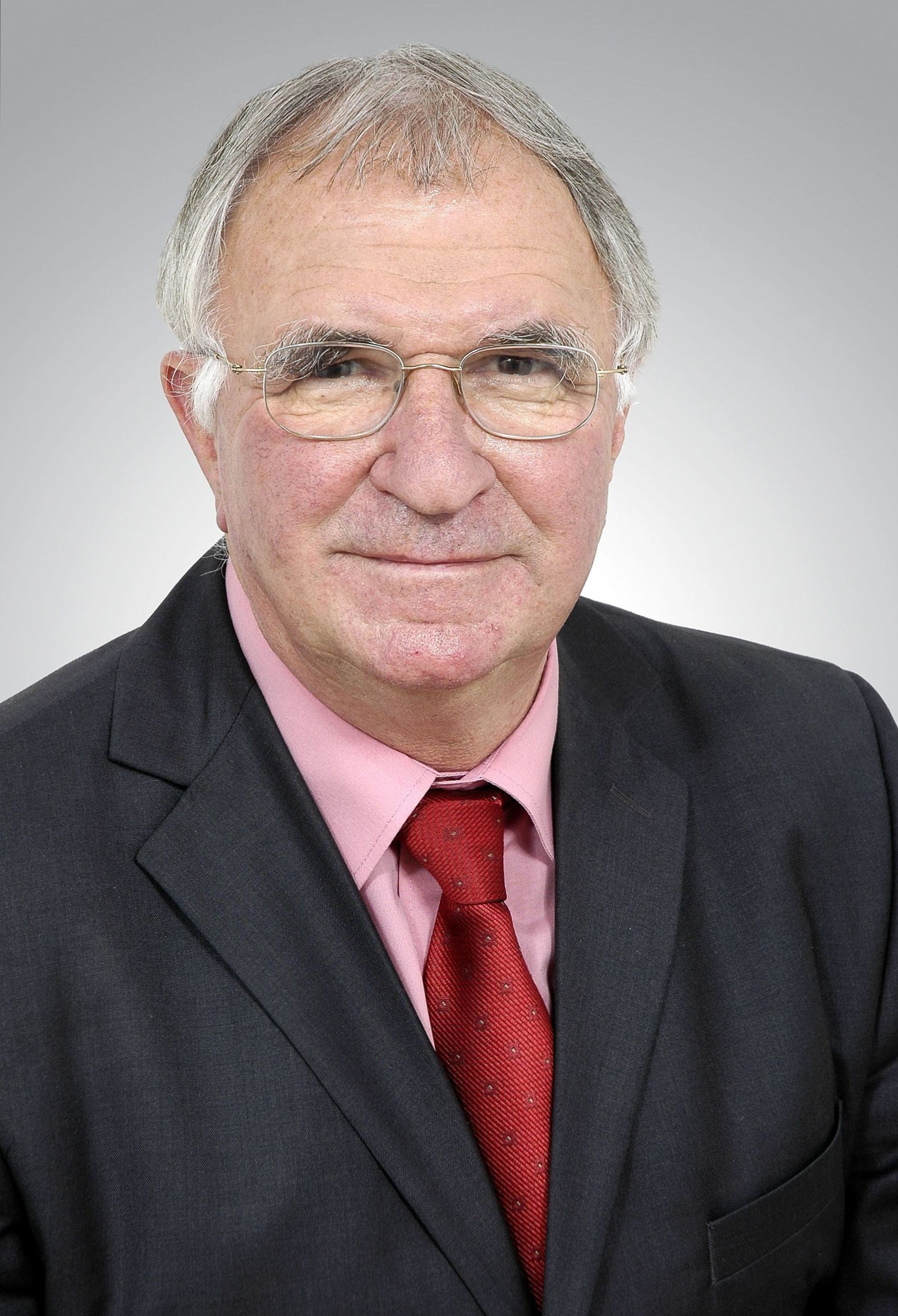
Antoni Piechniczek replaced Kulesza as manager soon after the incident.

A week later, the PZPN announced its final verdict. The only versions of events accepted for consideration were those recounted by Kulesza and Blaut; those of all the players and of the team physiotherapist and sport psychologist were dismissed. Żmuda and Młynarczyk were barred from playing for either Poland or their clubs for eight months, and Terlecki and Boniek for twelve. Smolarek received a two-month ban, which was suspended for six months. Citing their previous records of insubordination and misconduct, the PZPN called Terlecki and Boniek "rabble-rousers".

=== Reactions ===
Kulesza left his job soon afterwards; according to Majchrzak, he resigned in protest at the players' punishments, which he thought were too harsh. Officials at Widzew Łódź accused the PZPN of bias, saying the association had not supervised the players properly and should shoulder some of the blame. Directors at Widzew and ŁKS Łódź briefly considered resigning their PZPN memberships and organising their own league championship, but did not. The national team players' council, at that time comprising Marek Dziuba, Paweł Janas and Wojciech Rudy, wrote an open letter expressing surprise at what they saw as excessive sanctions against Terlecki, Boniek, Żmuda and Młynarczyk. They admitted the goalkeeper's conduct had been far from exemplary, but contended that the incident was only minor, and had been exacerbated by disproportionately prominent and negative press coverage.

Despite being without some of their top players, Widzew Łódź were crowned champions of Poland at the end of the 1980–81 season. Ryba left his post in April 1981, along with a number of his contemporaries, described by Stefan Szczepłek, a sports journalist and football historian, as "honest officials, together with some football-friendly Polish Army officers". In their place came a number of communist officials, most prominently Włodzimierz Reczek, an erstwhile Politburo member, who took over as head of the football association despite a reputation for not liking the sport.

Młynarczyk, Boniek and Żmuda had their bans cancelled early. Żmuda and Młynarczyk returned in the 1–0 home win over East Germany on 2 May 1981, and Boniek was reinstated four months later. The players' recall was partly due to the efforts of Kulesza's replacement, Antoni Piechniczek, to secure their return. According to Majchrzak, Boniek and Żmuda apologised for their actions before the General Committee for Physical Culture and Sport of the Polish People's Republic, the PZPN's governing body, but kept this from Terlecki, who appealed to have his ban lifted several times, but to no avail.

== Legacy ==
Terlecki openly participated in students' strikes at his old university in Łódź and across Poland over the next few months, providing food to the students by the car-load. ŁKS cancelled his registration in early 1981. Majchrzak stresses that Terlecki was the only player involved in the incident not to regain his place in the Poland team, and claims that this was down to an intense grudge held against him by the Ministry of Internal Affairs and Secret Police (SB). Terlecki developed his own theory that the media circus following the airport incident had been deliberately engineered by the SB to head the players off forming their own trade union. There were several other incidents of drunkenness involving Młynarczyk, Majchrzak writes, but this was the only occasion when any player was punished for it. In October 1981, when the team travelled to Argentina, Młynarczyk arrived at Okęcie "completely drunk", according to Iwan, but far from reprimanding him, team staff gave him even more alcohol during the flight to help ease the pain of his broken finger.

Poland qualified for the 1982 World Cup with a perfect record, and performed strongly in the competition, losing to Italy in the semi-finals but beating France in a play-off to claim third place. Kulesza became the manager of Tunisia, and later founded a coaching school in Warsaw.

Saying he was "being treated like a leper", Terlecki emigrated to the United States in June 1981, and joined the Pittsburgh Spirit of the Major Indoor Soccer League. He pursued a new life in America with great vigour. Terlecki's on-field displays in the U.S. were widely praised. In three seasons with Pittsburgh he became the club's all-time top goalscorer, but managers reportedly had trouble "harness[ing] Terlecki's fiery temper" and his wife Ewa became intensely homesick. Terlecki announced his intention to move back to Poland in 1985, saying he believed the political situation had improved and that he wished to reunite his family. He returned home the following year, and resumed his career in Polish club football. He expressed a desire to play for the national team again, but was never selected.
