= Xavi Simons =

Dutch footballer (born 2003)

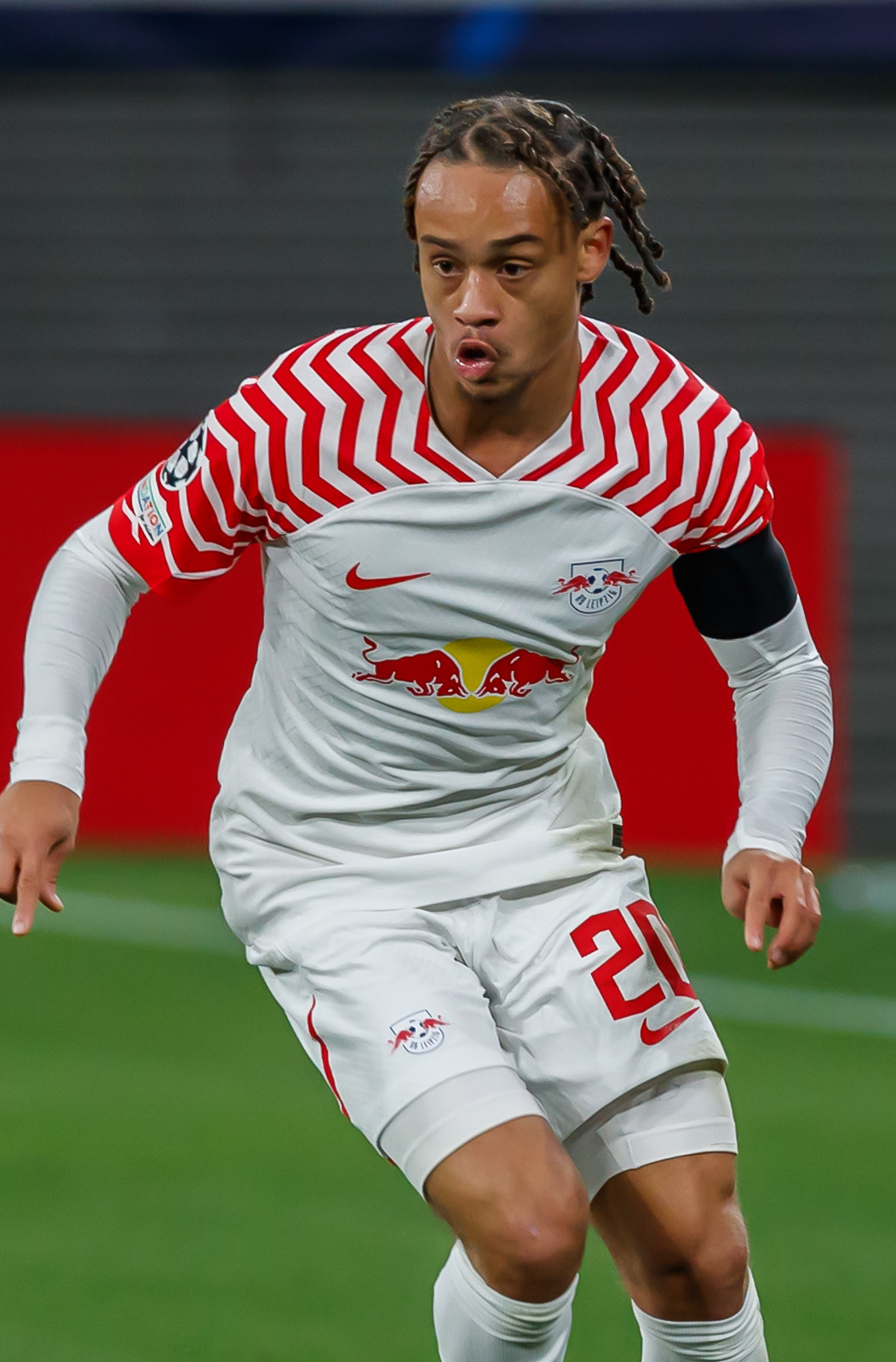
- Xavi Simons playing for RB Leipzig in 2023 in an UEFA Champions League match against Manchester City F.C.

Personal information
- Full name: Xavi Quentin Shay Simons
- Date of birth: 21 April 2003 (age 23)
- Place of birth: Amsterdam, Netherlands
- Height: 1.79 m (5 ft 10 in)
- Positions: Attacking midfielder; winger

Team information
- Current team: Tottenham Hotspur
- Number: 7

Youth career
- 2008–2010: CD Thader
- 2010–2019: Barcelona
- 2019–2022: Paris Saint-Germain

Senior career*
| Years | Team | Apps | (Gls) |
| 2021–2022 | Paris Saint-Germain | 7 | (0) |
| 2022–2023 | PSV | 34 | (19) |
| 2023–2025 | Paris Saint-Germain | 0 | (0) |
| 2023–2025 | → RB Leipzig (loan) | 43 | (12) |
| 2025 | RB Leipzig | 15 | (6) |
| 2025– | Tottenham Hotspur | 41 | (5) |

International career^{‡}
| 2018 | Netherlands U15 | 5 | (1) |
| 2019 | Netherlands U16 | 3 | (0) |
| 2019 | Netherlands U17 | 6 | (3) |
| 2021 | Netherlands U19 | 6 | (3) |
| 2022 | Netherlands U21 | 2 | (0) |
| 2022– | Netherlands | 34 | (6) |
Medal record
Men's football
Representing Netherlands
UEFA European Championship
| Bronze medal – third place | 2024 Germany | Team |
- * Club domestic league appearances and goals as of 23:50, 25 April 2026 (UTC) ‡ National team caps and goals as of 23:27, 31 March 2026 (UTC)

Xavi Quentin Shay Simons (Dutch: [ˈtɕaːʋi ˈsimɔns]; born 21 April 2003) is a Dutch professional footballer who plays as an attacking midfielder or winger for Premier League club Tottenham Hotspur and the Netherlands national team.

Originally a product of Barcelona's La Masia, Simons signed for Paris Saint-Germain (PSG) in July 2019, where he would initially join the under-19s before making his professional debut in 2021. With PSG, he won a Ligue 1 and Coupe de France title. In 2022, Simons returned to his native Netherlands with PSV, winning the KNVB Cup, Johan Cruyff Shield, and Eredivisie top scorer award in his only season at the club. In 2023, he rejoined PSG before being immediately loaned out to RB Leipzig in Germany for two seasons and signing permanently for the club in January 2025. In August 2025, he joined Premier League club Tottenham Hotspur.

Initially playing for the Netherlands at youth level, Simons received his first call-up to the national team for the 2022 FIFA World Cup, and made his debut at the tournament.

== Early life ==
Born in Amsterdam, Xavi is the son of Peggy Simons and Dutch former footballer Regillio Simons, who are both of Surinamese descent. Xavi's older brother Faustino (born 1996), who also played football, shares the same birthday as him.

At the age of three, he moved with his family to a village near Alicante, Spain where he started playing football at Club Deportivo Thader, a local club.

== Club career ==
=== Early career ===
Simons joined the youth setup of Barcelona in 2010 from Club Deportivo Thader of Alicante, and quickly progressed to become one of the Catalan club's most highly rated youth players, with English club Chelsea reportedly attempting to sign him at a young age. Described as a "prodigy", he joined the group of players represented by agent Mino Raiola in 2017.

=== Paris Saint-Germain ===
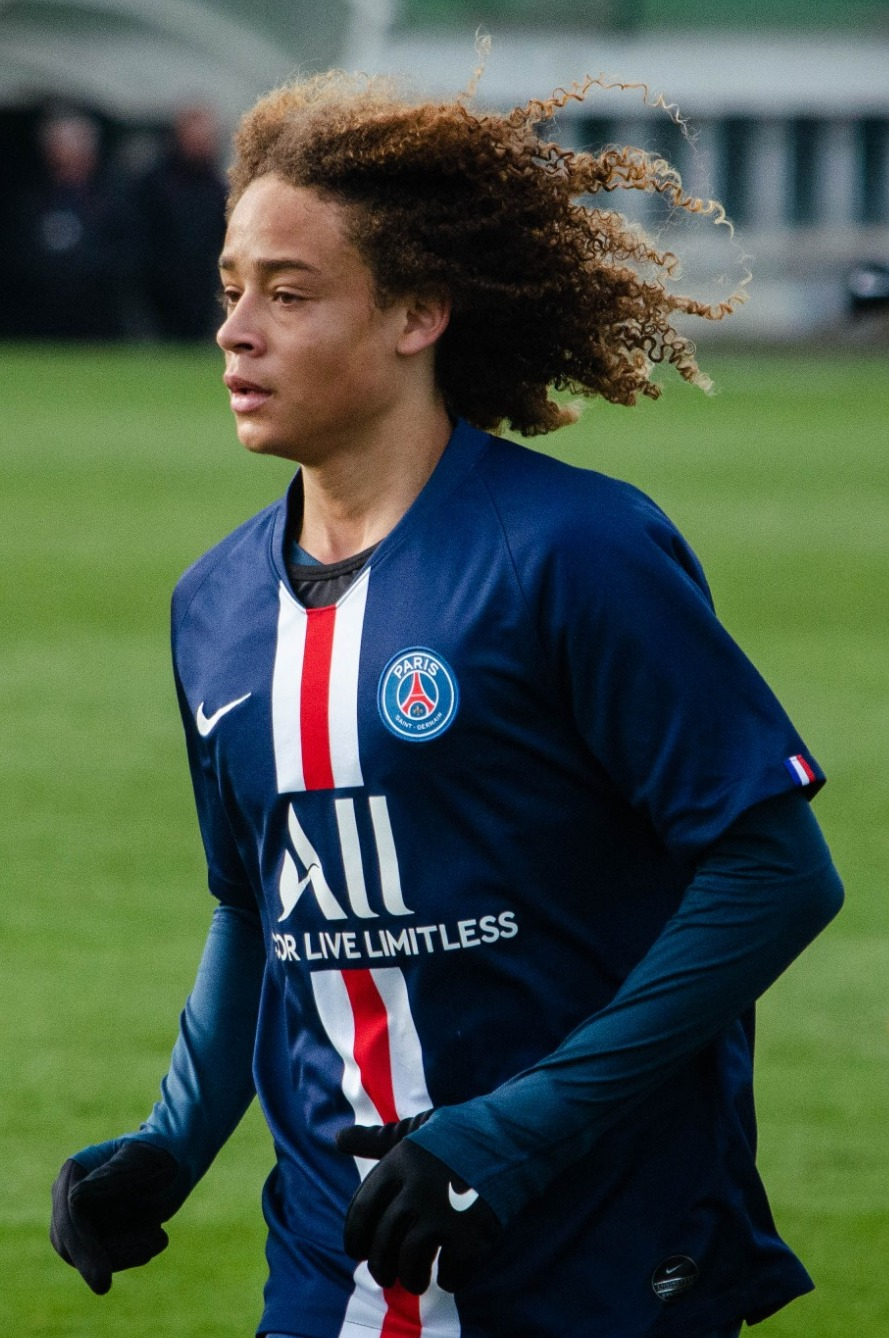
Simons as a Paris Saint-Germain youth player in 2020

In July 2019, Simons moved to French club Paris Saint-Germain (PSG), having failed to agree a new contract with Barcelona. His three-year contract with the Parisian club was reportedly worth up to €1 million annually. On 10 February 2021, Simons made his professional debut for PSG, coming on as a substitute for Julian Draxler in a 1–0 Coupe de France win over Caen. He made his Ligue 1 debut as a substitute in a 4–1 win over Strasbourg two months later. On 19 May 2021, he won his first professional trophy, the Coupe de France.

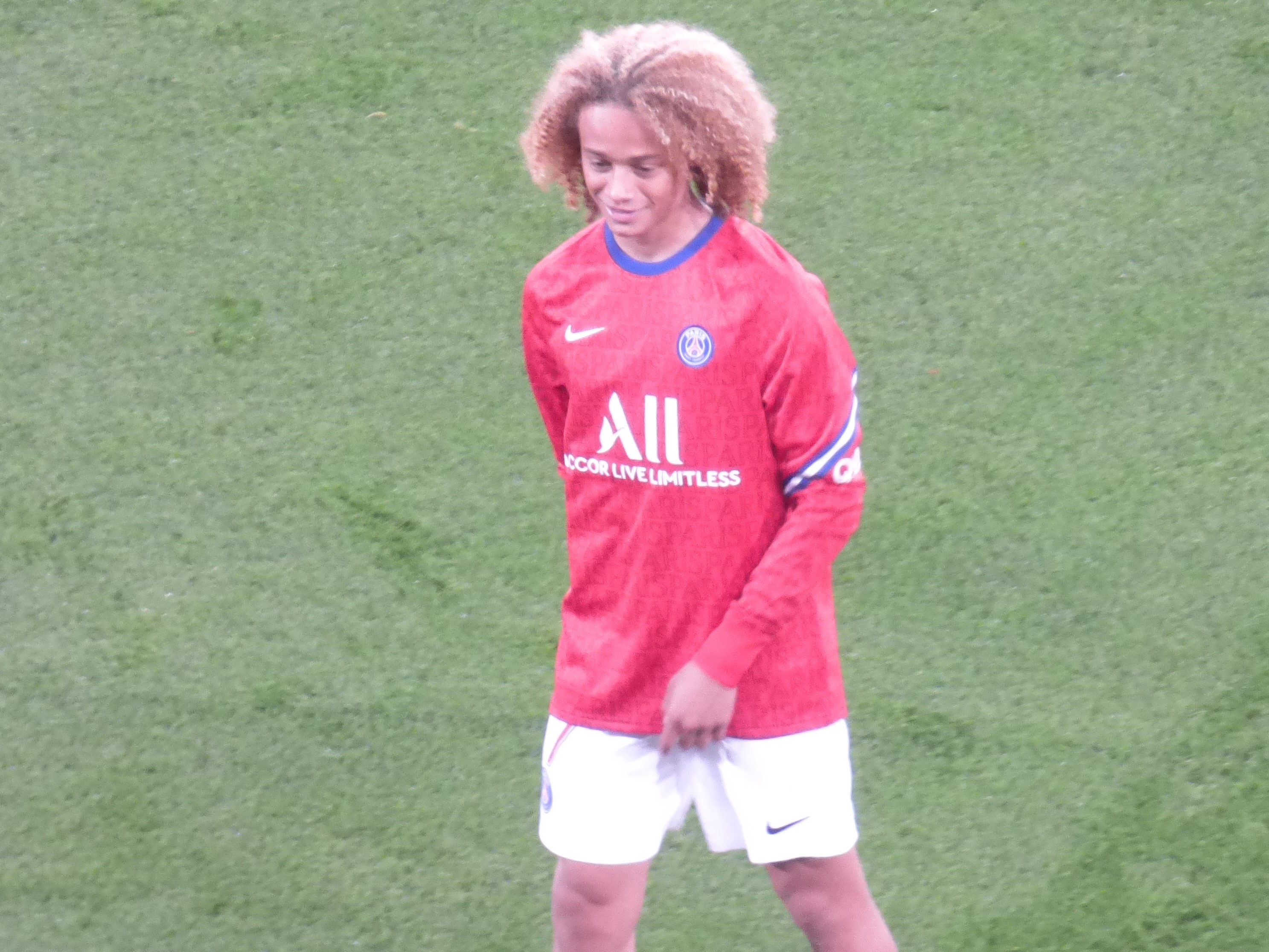
Simons with Paris Saint-Germain in 2020

Ahead of the 2021–22 season, Simons was included in the first-team preparation and pre-season by manager Mauricio Pochettino. On 18 August, Simons was sent back to train with the under-19 squad coached by Zoumana Camara. He eventually made his first appearance of the season for PSG in a 3–0 cup win over Feignies Aulnoye on 19 December, his first ever professional start. On 3 January 2022, Simons recorded his first senior assist in a 4–0 cup win over Vannes, a pass for Kylian Mbappé. His first league appearance of the 2021–22 season came in a 1–1 draw against Lyon on 9 January, where he came on as a 69th-minute substitute. On 31 January, Simons missed the final penalty in a 6–5 penalty shoot-out defeat to Nice in the round of 16 of the Coupe de France. On 11 February, he made his first Ligue 1 start in a 1–0 win over Rennes at the Parc des Princes. At the end of the season, Simons won the Ligue 1 title, his first professional league title.

=== PSV ===
On 28 June 2022, Simons signed for Eredivisie club PSV Eindhoven on a five-year contract. Although he was initially expected to extend his contract with PSG and join PSV on loan, the situation changed when PSV no longer wanted a loan deal. However, PSG negotiated a reported €6 million buy-back clause in Simons's contract, effective in 2023.

Simons scored his first career goal on his PSV debut, a 5–3 win over rivals Ajax in the Johan Cruyff Shield on 30 July 2022. On 7 August, in his first Eredivisie game, he provided an assist for Johan Bakayoko, who opened the scoring in a 4–1 victory against newly promoted Emmen. Simons made his European debut with PSV in the UEFA Champions League qualifiers, and scored his first European goal in a 5–1 UEFA Europa League group stage victory away to Zürich on 6 October. In the 2023 KNVB Cup final, he provided the assist for Thorgan Hazard's goal as PSV came out victorious over Ajax on penalties. In the final match of the 2022–23 Eredivisie season on 28 May 2023, Simons scored a brace, including a stoppage-time winner, in a 2–1 victory over AZ, securing second place for PSV and a spot in the Champions League qualifiers for the following season. With nineteen goals, he shared the Eredivisie top scorer award with Anastasios Douvikas of Utrecht. Simons finished the club season with twenty-two goals and twelve assists in forty-eight games across all competitions, and won two Player of the Month awards in August 2022 and March 2023.

On 16 July 2023, it was announced by PSV that Simons had departed the club's training camp in order to finalize a transfer back to Paris Saint-Germain.

=== Return to Paris Saint-Germain ===
On 19 July 2023, Simons returned to Paris Saint-Germain, signing a four-year contract after the club triggered a reported €6 million buy-back clause in his PSV contract, where Simons had the final say on his return.

==== Loan to RB Leipzig ====
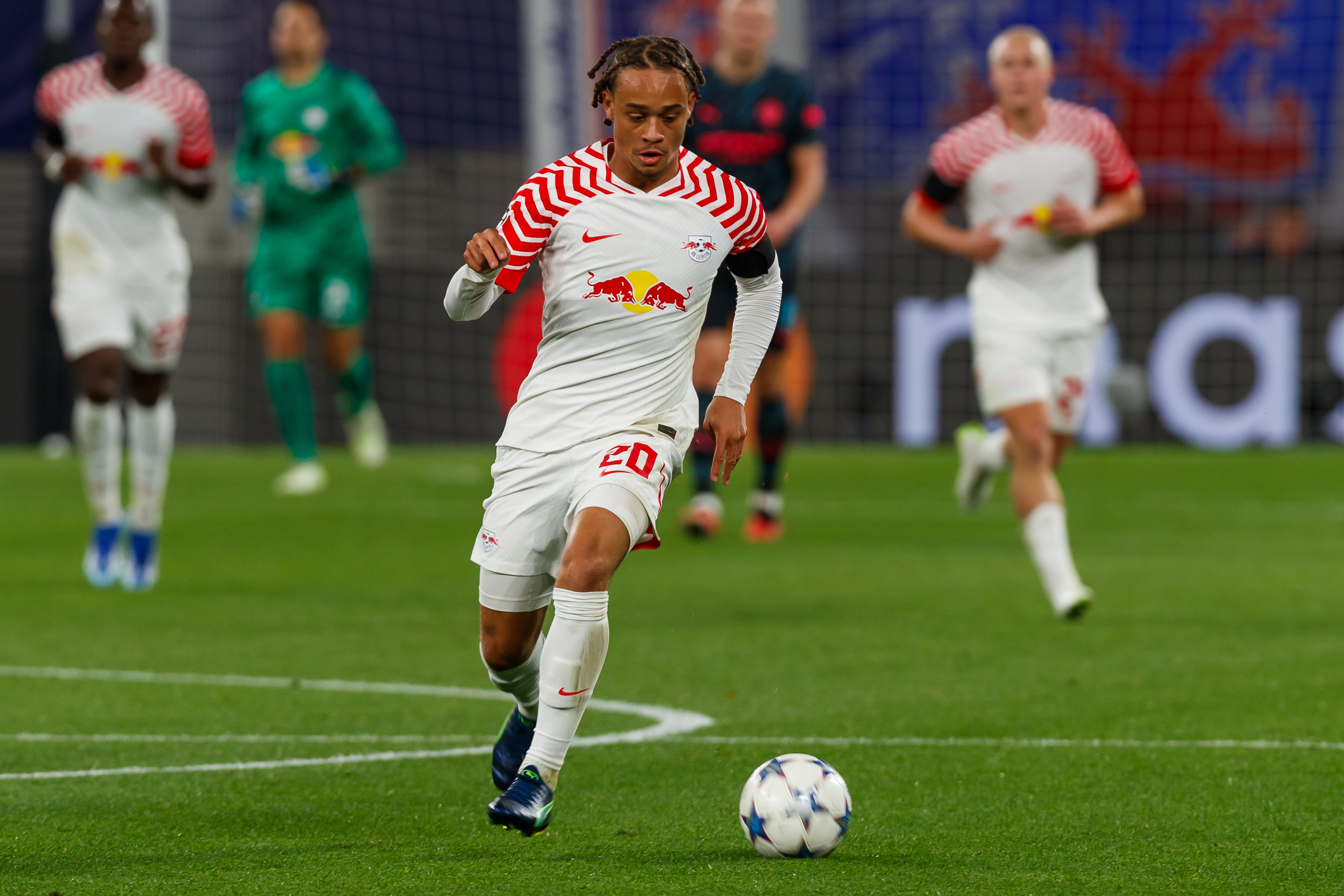
Simons playing for RB Leipzig in 2023 against Manchester City in the UEFA Champions League

Immediately after being signed back by Paris Saint-Germain, Simons was loaned out to Bundesliga club RB Leipzig for the 2023–24 season. He was assigned the number 20 jersey. On 12 August 2023, he made his debut for the club in a 3–0 win over Bayern Munich in the 2023 DFL-Supercup. On 25 August, he scored his first Bundesliga goal in a 5–1 win over VfB Stuttgart, a match in which he also recorded two assists. On 25 October, Simons scored his first goal in the Champions League in a 3–1 victory over Red Star Belgrade. In addition, he was named player of the match, as he also provided an assist; aged 20 years and 187 days, he became the youngest Dutch player to both score and assist in the competition since Arjen Robben in 2003. In the second fixture against Red Star Belgrade on 7 November, Simons scored the opening goal in a 2–1 win, securing qualification to the round of 16. By the end of the season, Simons had scored eight goals and registered eleven assists in thirty-two Bundesliga appearances, finishing joint-second in assists and helping RB Leipzig to a fourth-place finish.

On 5 August 2024, Simons was again loaned out to RB Leipzig for the rest of the season. On 12 January 2025, on the occasion of his first start since October 2024 due to an injury, Simons scored a brace in a 4–2 victory over Werder Bremen, his first brace in the Bundesliga on his 40th appearance in the competition.

=== RB Leipzig ===
On 30 January 2025, RB Leipzig signed Simons on a permanent deal from Paris Saint-Germain for €50 million plus €31 million in potential bonuses. RB Leipzig broke their transfer record to sign him on a contract until 2027.

On 14 May 2025, Simons informed Leipzig of his decision to leave the club at the end of the 2024–25 season, citing the team's failure to qualify for the following season's Champions League as a key factor.

=== Tottenham Hotspur ===
On 29 August 2025, Premier League club Tottenham Hotspur announced the signing of Simons on a five-year minimum contract, for a fee believed to be around £51.8 million. The transfer was noteworthy due to Simons's decision to sign for Tottenham in spite of the well-documented interest of their London rivals Chelsea, who had courted him throughout the summer 2025 transfer window.

Simons made his debut for Tottenham on 13 September 2025, starting and assisting the first goal in a 3–0 away victory against West Ham United. On 6 December, he scored his first goal for the club and registered an assist in a 2–0 home win over Brentford. On 9 December, he scored his first Champions League goal for Spurs in a 3–0 win over Slavia Prague. On 25 April 2026, Simons suffered an injury during a 1–0 away victory against Wolverhampton Wanderers. The injury, a ruptured anterior cruciate ligament of his right knee, meant he was ruled out for at least seven months, so would miss the rest of the season and the 2026 FIFA World Cup.

== International career ==
Simons represented the Netherlands at under-15, under-16, under-17, and under-19 and under-21 levels.

On 21 October 2022, Simons was included in the pre-selection of the Netherlands national team for the first time in his career. On 11 November, he was officially called up for the 2022 FIFA World Cup in Qatar by head coach Louis van Gaal. The youngest player in the Dutch squad, Simons was described as a "somewhat surprise inclusion". On 3 December, he made his Netherlands and World Cup debut in a 3–1 win over the United States in the round of 16, becoming the youngest player to feature in the knockout stages of the World Cup for the Netherlands. In the quarter-finals, he was an unused substitute as the Dutch were eliminated by Argentina in a penalty shootout.

On 24 March 2023, Simons made his first start for the Netherlands in their opening UEFA Euro 2024 qualifier against France. He went on to feature in every match of the qualifying campaign for the Oranje, starting in seven of the eight Group B fixtures. In June 2023, Simons was a member of the Dutch squad for the 2023 UEFA Nations League Finals, starting against both Croatia in the semi-final and Italy in the third place play-off. On 29 May 2024, Simons was named in the Netherlands' squad for UEFA Euro 2024. He scored his first senior international goal in the team's final warm-up friendly – a 4–0 win over Iceland on 10 June. On 10 July, he scored a goal in the 7th minute against England in the semi-finals. However, the Netherlands were eventually defeated 2–1.

== Personal life ==
At the age of 13, Simons had his first advertising contract with Nike. He switched to Adidas in 2021 before joining Puma in 2023. In August 2018, he featured in a Nike commercial titled "Awaken the Phantom" alongside players Philippe Coutinho, Kevin De Bruyne, Neymar, Ronaldinho, Pierre-Emerick Aubameyang, and Andrea Pirlo. During his youth career, Simons amassed a large social media following on Instagram; he had over two million followers on the platform in 2019, at the age of 16. In March 2020, Simons was named on Goal's "NxGn 2020" list of the fifty best wonderkids in world football. He was also included in The Guardian's "Next Generation 2020" in October.

Following the death of Mino Raiola in April 2022, Rafaela Pimenta became Simons's agent. In May 2023, he changed his representation to Darren Dein.

In October 2026, whilst recovering from an anterior cruciate ligament injury, Simons enrolled in an online business course for athletes at Harvard University.

== Career statistics ==
=== Club ===
As of match played 25 April 2026

Appearances and goals by club, season and competition
| Club | Season | League | | | National cup (Note: Includes Coupe de France, KNVB Cup, DFB-Pokal, FA Cup) | | League cup (Note: Includes EFL Cup) | | Europe | | Other | | Total | |
| Club | Season | Division | Apps | Goals | Apps | Goals | Apps | Goals | Apps | Goals | Apps | Goals | Apps | Goals |
|---|---|---|---|---|---|---|---|---|---|---|---|---|---|---|
| Paris Saint-Germain | 2020–21 | Ligue 1 | 1 | 0 | 1 | 0 | — | | 0 | 0 | 0 | 0 | 2 | 0 |
| Paris Saint-Germain | 2021–22 | Ligue 1 | 6 | 0 | 3 | 0 | — | | 0 | 0 | 0 | 0 | 9 | 0 |
| Paris Saint-Germain | Total | | 7 | 0 | 4 | 0 | — | | 0 | 0 | 0 | 0 | 11 | 0 |
| PSV | 2022–23 | Eredivisie | 34 | 19 | 4 | 1 | — | | 9 (Note: Two appearances in UEFA Champions League, seven appearances and one goal in UEFA Europa League) | 1 | 1 (Note: Appearance in Johan Cruyff Shield) | 1 | 48 | 22 |
| RB Leipzig (loan) | 2023–24 | Bundesliga | 32 | 8 | 2 | 0 | — | | 8 (Note: Appearances in UEFA Champions League) | 2 | 1 (Note: Appearance in DFL-Supercup) | 0 | 43 | 10 |
| RB Leipzig | 2024–25 (Note: Part of this season was spent on loan from Paris Saint-Germain) | Bundesliga | 25 | 10 | 3 | 1 | — | | 5 | 0 | — | | 33 | 11 |
| RB Leipzig | 2025–26 | Bundesliga | 1 | 0 | 1 | 1 | — | | — | | — | | 2 | 1 |
| RB Leipzig | Leipzig total | | 58 | 18 | 6 | 2 | — | | 13 | 2 | 1 | 0 | 78 | 22 |
| Tottenham Hotspur | 2025–26 | Premier League | 28 | 2 | 1 | 0 | 2 | 0 | 10 | 3 | — | | 41 | 5 |
| Career total | | | 127 | 39 | 15 | 3 | 2 | 0 | 32 | 6 | 2 | 1 | 178 | 49 |

=== International ===
As of match played 31 March 2026

Appearances and goals by national team and year
| National team | Year | Apps | Goals |
|---|---|---|---|
| Netherlands | 2022 | 1 | 0 |
| Netherlands | 2023 | 10 | 0 |
| Netherlands | 2024 | 13 | 3 |
| Netherlands | 2025 | 8 | 3 |
| Netherlands | 2026 | 2 | 0 |
| Total | | 34 | 6 |

Netherlands score listed first, score column indicates score after each Simons goal.

List of international goals scored by Xavi Simons
| No. | Date | Venue | Cap | Opponent | Score | Result | Competition |
|---|---|---|---|---|---|---|---|
| 1 | 10 June 2024 | De Kuip, Rotterdam, Netherlands | 14 | Iceland | 1–0 | 4–0 | Friendly |
| 2 | 10 July 2024 | Westfalenstadion, Dortmund, Germany | 20 | England | 1–0 | 1–2 | UEFA Euro 2024 |
| 3 | 7 September 2024 | Philips Stadion, Eindhoven, Netherlands | 21 | Bosnia and Herzegovina | 5–2 | 5–2 | 2024–25 UEFA Nations League A |
| 4 | 23 March 2025 | Mestalla, Valencia, Spain | 26 | Spain | 3–3 | 3–3 (a.e.t.) (4–5 p) | 2024–25 UEFA Nations League A |
| 5 | 10 June 2025 | Euroborg, Groningen, Netherlands | 28 | Malta | 4–0 | 8–0 | 2026 FIFA World Cup qualification |
| 6 | 17 November 2025 | Johan Cruyff Arena, Amsterdam, Netherlands | 32 | Lithuania | 3–0 | 4–0 | 2026 FIFA World Cup qualification |

== Honours ==
Paris Saint-Germain

- Ligue 1: 2021–22
- Coupe de France: 2020–21

PSV

- KNVB Cup: 2022–23
- Johan Cruyff Shield: 2022

RB Leipzig

- DFL-Supercup: 2023

Individual

- Eredivisie Player of the Month: August 2022, March 2023
- Eredivisie Talent of the Month: January 2023
- Eredivisie top scorer: 2022–23 (shared)
- Eredivisie Talent of the Year: 2022–23
- Bundesliga Goal of the Month: September 2023, January 2024
- Bundesliga Rookie of the Month: December 2023, April 2024
- VDV Bundesliga Team of the Season: 2023–24
