= Mowlik (surname) =

Mowlik is a surname. Notable people with the surname include:

- Mariusz Mowlik (born 1981), Polish footballer and sporting director
- Piotr Mowlik (born 1951), Polish footballer
