= Hantak =

Hantak is a surname. Notable people with the surname include:

- Dick Hantak (born 1938), American football official
- Ted Hantak (born 1962), American soccer player
