= Kevin Maher (disambiguation) =

Kevin Maher (born 1976) is an English association football player.

Kevin Maher may also refer to:

- Kevin Maher (American soccer), retired American soccer player
- Kevin James Maher (born 1988), Canadian musician and producer
- Kevin Maher (writer) (born 1972), Irish writer
