= Sunday of Miracles =

The Sunday of Miracles (Polish: Niedziela cudów) is a colloquial description of the events that took place during the last matchday of the 1992–93 Ekstraklasa season.

== Background ==
In the 1992–93 season, Legia Warsaw, ŁKS Łódź and Lech Poznań fought for the national championship. Before the last round of matches, Legia led from ŁKS on goal difference, with Lech three points behind in third. In the last round, ŁKS played Olimpia Poznań, and Legia played Wisła Kraków. Both teams won their matches by wide margins (ŁKS 7–1, Legia 6–0), which raised suspicions of corruption. Although neither Legia nor ŁKS was found guilty, the Polish Football Association (PZPN) decided to cancel the results of the matches of both teams and award the championship to Lech Poznań.

== Aftermath ==
On 10 July 1993, a meeting of the Polish Football Association took place, during which PZPN delegates gave opinions on the matches of Legia and ŁKS. The vice president of the union Ryszard Kulesza accused the activists of tolerance for corruption in Polish football, adding that "all of Poland saw" that the Wisła match with Legia was bribed. This sentence was supported by Zygmunt Lenkiewicz. On the other hand, Maciej Kapelczak read the ruling, according to which the accusations against Legia and ŁKS were caused mainly by journalists' insinuations, and the punishments were unjustified due to the lack of evidence. Kapelczak's words were to be confirmed by the opinions of the judges and qualifiers as well as the post-match protocols.

At this meeting, despite the lack of formal evidence, the results of the Wisła v. Legia and ŁKS v. Olimpia matches were canceled by the ratio of 68:20 votes to 11 abstentions, as the official reason was "lack of sporting spirit".

The proceedings in the matter of trade in matches were also investigated by the prosecutor's office in Kraków, but it was discontinued.

The decision of the Polish Football Association also had a financial impact on Lech, Legia and ŁKS. For Legia and ŁKS, the loss of a place in European cups was associated with a loss of income from TV broadcasts or ticket sales. Lech, who had financial problems at the time, was forced to pay bonuses in connection with winning the Polish championship, which was demanded by Kazimierz Sidorczuk.

There was controversy as to whether the matches of Legia and ŁKS in the 34th round of the 1st league of the 1992–1993 season were bribed. The allegations of bribery were dismissed, among others, by the president of Olimpia Bolesław Krzyżostaniak, the players of Legia Juliusz Kruszankin and Wojciech Kowalczyk, the football player of ŁKS Tomasz Wieszczycki or the referee Michał Listkiewicz.

In 2004 and 2007, Legia filed applications to revoke the decision of the Polish Football Association and to restore its Polish championship in the 1992–93 season. However, these claims were rejected.

In 2021, a Wisła footballer from the 1992–1993 season Grzegorz Szeliga admitted selling a match with Legia.
