= Ryszard Kulesza =

Polish footballer, coach, and official

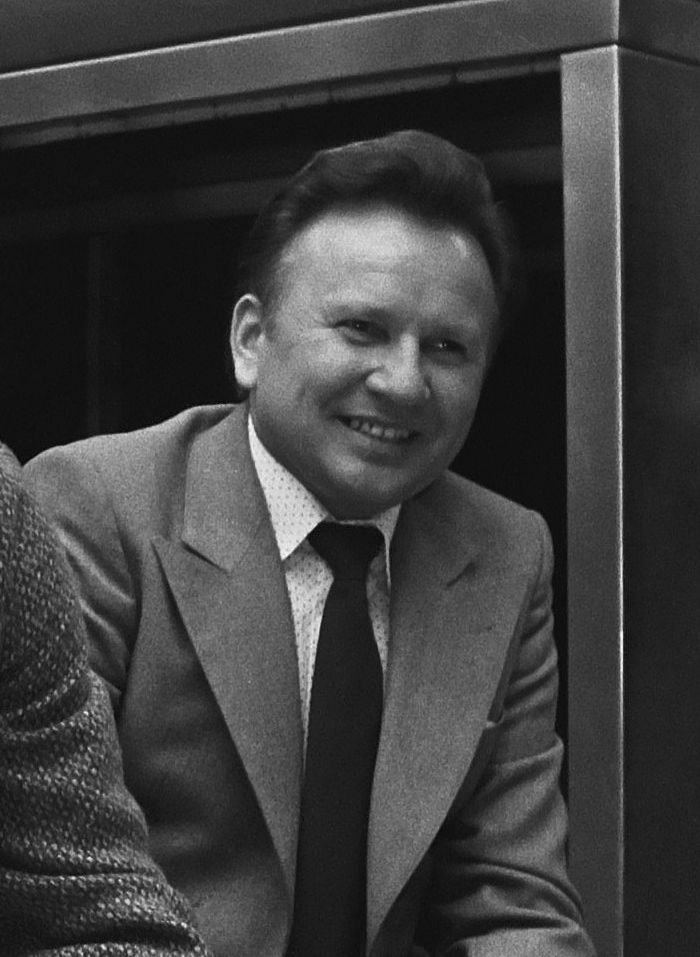

Personal information
- Date of birth: 28 September 1929
- Place of birth: Warsaw, Poland
- Date of death: 19 May 2008 (aged 78)
- Place of death: Warsaw, Poland
- Position: Striker

Youth career
- 1945–1949: Okęcie Warsaw
- 1949–1950: Polonia Warsaw

Senior career*
Years	Team	Apps	(Gls)
1950–1954	Polonia Warsaw		
1955	Gwardia Warsaw		
1956–1957	Polonia Warsaw		
1958–1959	Polonia Bydgoszcz		
1960–1961	Polonia Warsaw		

Managerial career
- Ruch Piaseczno
- 1963–1965: Mazowsze Grójec
- 1966–1972: Znicz Pruszków
- 1972–1974: Lechia Gdańsk
- 1974–1975: Poland U21
- 1975–1978: Poland U23
- 1978–1980: Poland
- 1981–1983: Tunisia
- 1984–1986: MC Oujda
- 1986–1987: CS Sfaxien
- 1987–1988: CA Bizertin
- * Club domestic league appearances and goals

Ryszard Kulesza (28 September 1931 – 19 May 2008) was a Polish football player, manager and executive, one of managers of the Poland national team. His father was killed during the Warsaw Uprising, and Kulesza himself, who was 13, was lucky to survive, as a German soldier threw him under a passing tank. After the uprising, he was forcibly taken to Germany as Ost-Arbeiter, but escaped and returned to Poland on foot.

After the war, Kulesza played in such teams as Polonia Warsaw, Gwardia Warsaw and Polonia Bydgoszcz. He ended his career as a player in 1961, and began working as a coach. In 1972–1974, Kulesza coached Lechia Gdańsk, and since 1974, he worked with several national teams of Poland, such as U-21 (1974–1975), and U-23 (1975–1978). In 1976, Kulesza co-worked with Kazimierz Górski, and later with Jacek Gmoch (1976–1977 and 1978). In October 1978, after Gmoch's resignation, he took the post of general manager of Poland national team, but left this post in December 1980, as a result of the Okęcie Airport incident. He was replaced with Antoni Piechniczek.

In the 1980s, Kulesza worked in Tunisia and Morocco, returning to Poland in late 1980s. He became an activist of the Polish Football Federation (PZPN), founding the school of football coaches, which was popularly called kuleszówka. He actively fought corruption, and in 1993, he supported stripping Legia Warsaw of its championship title, after Warsaw's team routed Wisła Kraków 6–0 in Kraków on the Sunday of Miracles. Kulesza died in a hospital, suffering from Alzheimer disease. He was buried on 29 May 2008 at Warsaw's Czerniaków Cemetery.
