= Frank Farina =

Australian soccer player and coach

Frank Farina OAM
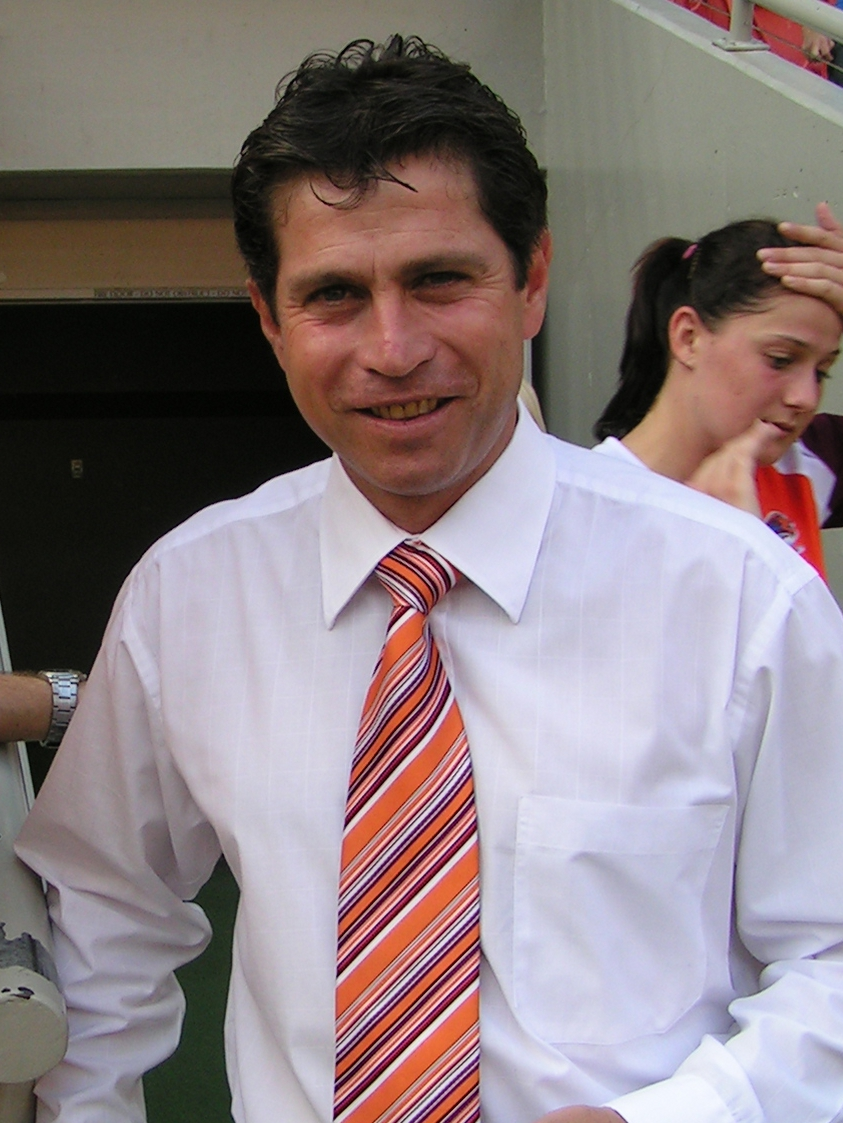

Personal information
- Date of birth: 5 September 1964 (age 62)
- Place of birth: Darwin, Australia
- Height: 1.77 m (5 ft 10 in)
- Position: Striker

Youth career
- Stratford United
- Edge Hill United
- 1982–1985: AIS

Senior career*
Years	Team	Apps	(Gls)
1981	Mareeba United	4	(0)
1983–1984	Canberra City	41	(15)
1985–1986	Sydney City	43	(21)
1987–1988	Marconi Stallions	47	(33)
1988–1991	Club Brugge	75	(43)
1991–1992	Bari	8	(0)
1992	→ Notts County (loan)	3	(0)
1992–1994	Strasbourg	47	(14)
1994–1995	Lille	27	(6)
1995–1998	Brisbane Strikers	63	(33)
1998–1999	Marconi Stallions	2	(0)
Total		336	(145)

International career
1982–1983	Australia U20	8	(3)
1984	Australia U23	5	(1)
1985	Australia B	2	(0)
1984–1995	Australia	37	(11)

Managerial career
- 1996–1998: Brisbane Strikers
- 1998–1999: Marconi Stallions
- 1998–2005: Australia
- 2006–2009: Brisbane Roar
- 2011–2013: Papua New Guinea
- 2012–2014: Sydney FC
- 2015: Fiji U20
- 2015–2016: Fiji
- 2016: Fiji U23
- 2021–2022: Wynnum District
Medal record
Men's football
Representing Australia (as manager)
OFC Nations Cup
Winner	2000
Runner-up	2002
Winner	2004
FIFA Confederations Cup
Bronze medal – third place	2001
- * Club domestic league appearances and goals

Frank Farina OAM (born 5 September 1964) is an Australian soccer coach and former player who played as a forward.

His playing career spanned Australia, Belgium, France, Italy and England, and was a major player for the Australian national team in the late 1980s and 1990s, as well as managing the national team in the early 2000s. He was the first Indigenous Australian to manage the national team. As of November 2021 he is a member of the inaugural National Indigenous Advisory Group of Football Australia.

== Club career ==
Born in Darwin, Northern Territory, Farina spent part of his childhood in Papua New Guinea and grew up in Cairns, north Queensland and went to school at St Augustine's College. While in Cairns, he played youth soccer with Stratford United and Edge Hill United FC. He won a prestigious position and scholarship at the Australian Institute of Sport (AIS) in 1982 and played in the National Soccer League for the Canberra Arrows the following year.

=== National Soccer League ===
When he was 16, one of his school teachers suggested he try out for Mareeba United of the semi-professional Queensland State League, with whom he played four games towards the end of the season, which was his first paid soccer experience.

Farina's early playing career was spent in Australia, playing the National Soccer League. He played for the Canberra Arrows, Sydney City and Marconi-Fairfield.

His early seasons were solid, scoring just under ten goals a season for Canberra in the 1983 and 1984 season. He earned the Most Entertaining Player award for the National Soccer League from SBS-TV in 1984. He made his full international debut as a substitute in Australia's 2–3 loss in China in 1984. Farina moved to Sydney City in 1985, and that season City made the 1985 NSL Grand Final, losing 2–0 over two legs to Brunswick, as well as winning the 1986 National Cup.

With the demise of Sydney City a few weeks into the 1987 season when owner Frank Lowy pulled out of funding the team, Farina moved to Marconi Fairfield for 1987 and 1988. His form flourished, scoring 16 and 17 goals respectively. In both years he won the Golden Boot Award, the Players' Player Medal (equivalent of Johnny Warren Medal) and, in 1988, the Most Entertaining Player award again from SBS-TV and the 1988 Oceania Player of the Year awards. He cemented his place in the Australian national team, the Socceroos, until his retirement from international competition in 1995, as well as attracting overseas interest.

=== Europe ===
This interest led to him leaving Australia, for Belgium, and Club Brugge in the latter half of 1988. His finishing ability was well regarded, and he played over 70 games for Brugge, scoring 43 goals and playing a major role in the club winning the Belgian First Division title in 1989/90 as well as the Belgian Cup in 1990/91 and Belgian Supercup in 1990 and 1991. Farina won the Belgian Golden Boot and Best Foreign Player awards in Club Brugge's successful 1989/90 season.

Farina subsequently transferred to Bari in Italy in 1991–92, where he became the first Australian to play in Serie A on a then record transfer fee for an Australian player of more than AUD$3m. However, with a change of coach nine games into the season and not in the same scoring form, he was considered one foreigner too many and dropped from the squad. He had a brief loan period at Notts County in England in 1991–92 until another change of manager, and transferred to Strasbourg in France in 1992–93 where he had two solid seasons in French First Division, scoring eight goals from 24 appearances in 1992–93, then six goals from 23 appearances in 1993–94. His final season playing in Europe was for Lille, who finished 14th in the French First Division, with Farina scoring six goals from 27 appearances.

== Managerial career ==
=== Brisbane Strikers ===
Farina's return to Australia was with the Brisbane Strikers, for the 1995–96 Season, scoring 20 goals from 20 matches, coming second in the Golden Boot awards behind Damien Mori (31 Goals). Brisbane finished fifth in 1995/96. In 1996–97, the Strikers needed a new Coach, and Farina stepped up to the position as the new player-coach. Farina led the Strikers to their first ever NSL title that year, as they defeated Sydney United 2–0 (with Farina scoring their first goal) in the Grand Final at Lang Park in front of a then capacity crowd of a little over 40,000 fans. He was named the Coach of the Year in 1997.

The Strikers could not back their title win however, crashing to third last in the 1997–98 season. Farina only managed one solitary goal in 18 appearances, with long-term injury and age (34) getting the better of him. He left the Strikers, and joined Marconi as a player-coach for a final season, with coaching being dominant, Farina only made two appearances for the Stallions, without scoring. However, he did coach the team to the Minor-Semi final place, eliminating the Northern Spirit, then losing 0–1 away to Perth Glory in the minor semi-final. He retired from playing that year.

=== Australia ===
Farina was appointed the Australian National Coach in 1999, becoming the first Indigenous Australian to manage the Australian National Team. He was chosen over many candidates including the then current caretaker coach Raul Blanco (who had replaced Terry Venables). His first match was a 0–2 Loss against a second string Brazilian team in Sydney, followed by a 2–2 draw with Brazil in Melbourne three days later.

The team under Farina won its first match in February 2000, with the majority of the European-based players in the side, they defeated Hungary 3–0 in Budapest.

==== 2000 OFC Nations Cup ====
In 2000, Australia played in, and won, the Oceania Nations Cup, and subsequently qualified for the 2001 FIFA Confederations Cup.

==== 2001 FIFA Confederations Cup ====
Australia impressed at the 2001 Confederations Cup, qualifying as runners up from Group A on goal difference thanks largely to a memorable 1–0 win over reigning world champions France, before eventually triumphing by the same scoreline in the third place playoff vs Brazil.

==== 2002 FIFA World Cup qualification ====
In 2001, Australia began its quest to qualify for the World Cup for a second time, and Farina led the team to huge victories over Tonga (22–0), and a record-breaking 31–0 win against American Samoa, Archie Thompson breaking the record for most goals in a single international with 13. Australia defeated Tonga 2–0 to win their group, then New Zealand 6–1 on Aggregate to Qualify for a World Cup Playoff against Uruguay.

In between these matches, Australia defeated Mexico and France during the Confederation Cup group stage, then defeated Brazil 1–0 win claim 3rd Place. These results strengthened belief that the team would make the World Cup Finals, but Australia failed again at the final World Cup hurdle, losing 3–1 on Aggregate (1–0 in Australia, 0–3 in Uruguay), which meant the 1974 Australian team remained the only team to qualify for the World Cup finals.

==== 2002 OFC Nations Cup ====
2002 was a dour year, with only the Oceanian nations cup taking place, Australia sending a team composed of Australian-based players to New Zealand. After comfortable early stages, Australia needed a Golden Goal to defeat Tonga in the semi-final, then losing 1–0 to New Zealand in the Final. The only game of note in 2003 was a 1–3 win against England in a friendly. In 2004, Australia progressed safely through the World Cup Oceania qualifiers.

==== 2005 FIFA Confederations Cup ====
2005 was Farina's final year as coach, his failure to win a single game in the Confederations Cup signalling the end of his reign. Farina became the subject of intense media pressure, as his team were criticised for not showing tactical awareness and cohesion expected of players of their quality. Farina became agitated with SBS football correspondents, accusing them of running a witch-hunt against him.

In 2005, after an unconvincing 2–1 win over Iraq during a friendly, Farina was involved in an incident with SBS reporter Andrew Orsatti in an informal post-match interview conducted in a corridor outside the dressing room. After a series of curt three/four worded answers to a series of questions shown on air, it was alleged by both parties that the other instigated a fracas. Eyewitnesses said that Farina grabbed Orsatti by the throat and tried to punch him. Orsatti later dropped assault charges against Farina. It was reported that Farina was upset at suggestions by the FFA that he attend anger management classes. Leading SBS commentator Les Murray said that Farina simply interpreted any criticism of his professional work as a coach to be a personal slight.

==== Departure ====
Farina departed by 'mutual consent' on 29 June 2005 after his team lost all three games at the 2005 Confederations Cup. He cited a loss in confidence on the part of the FFA chairman Frank Lowy and CEO John O'Neill. He was replaced by the Dutchman Guus Hiddink, who led Australia to a successful 2006 World Cup qualification campaign, defeating Uruguay (penalties after a 1–1 aggregate).

After his departure from the national team Farina was employed as a newspaper columnist and often conducted interviews about Australian football on talkback radio stations. He was also a radio commentator for the World Cup qualification matches against Uruguay.

=== Queensland and Brisbane Roar ===
On 15 November 2006 Farina was appointed head coach of Brisbane Roar after the departure of Miron Bleiberg. He is credited for his support of young Australian footballers, having recruited Michael Zullo and Tahj Minniecon, who were catalysts for much of Queensland's success in the 2007–2008 season.

On 11 October 2009, Farina was suspended indefinitely by the club over a drink-driving charge. He was on his way to training when he was caught. Farina was officially sacked on 14 October 2009. He was given a three-month severance package as part of the sacking.

=== Papua New Guinea ===
On 12 February 2011, it was confirmed that he had signed a contract with Papua New Guinea.

=== Sydney FC ===
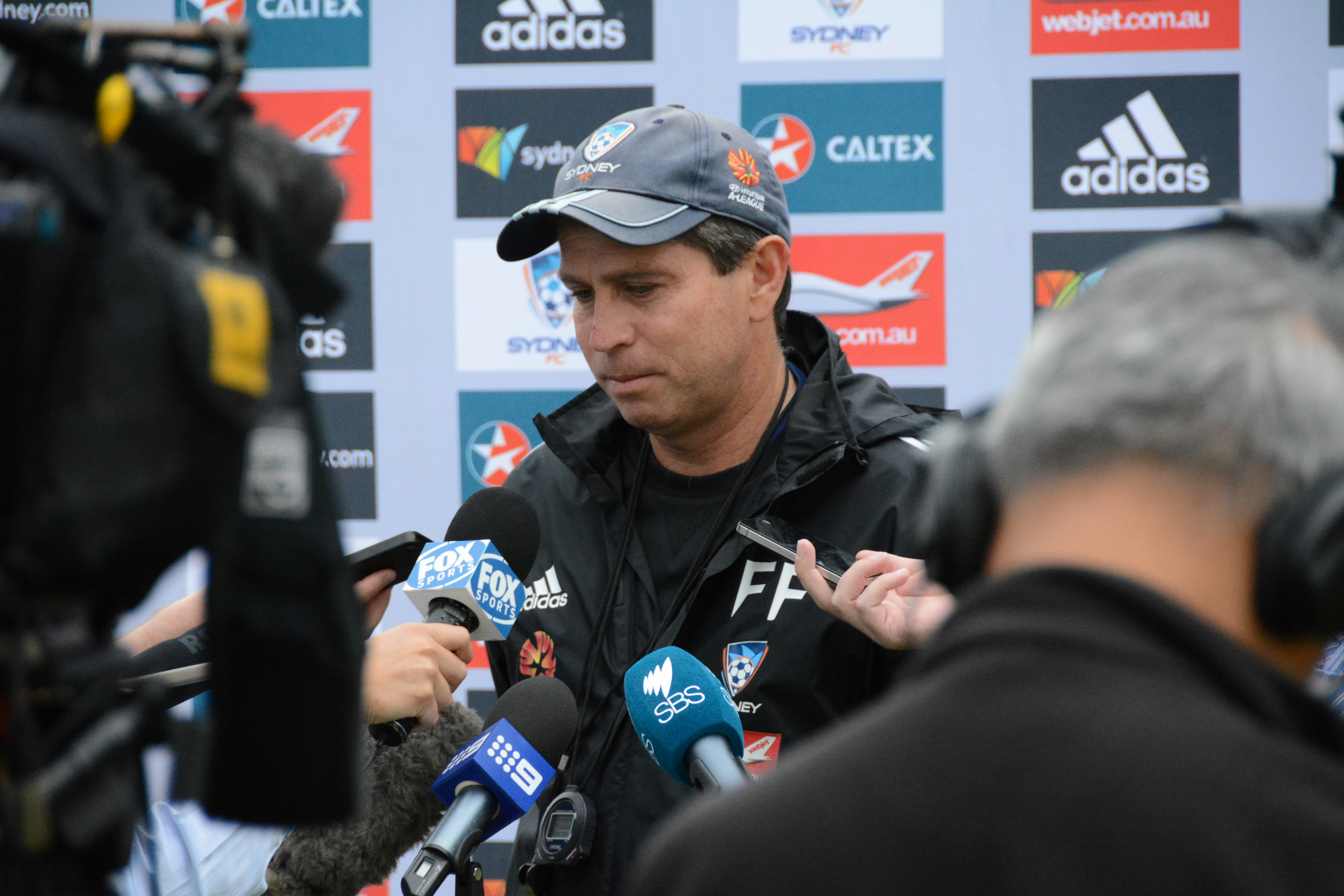
Farina with Sydney FC in 2014

On 28 November 2012, Farina was appointed head coach of Sydney FC, replacing Ian Crook who resigned and caretaker coach Steve Corica. Farina's spell in charge hasn't been without controversy, with his Sydney team noted for their inconsistency and criticised in some quarters for their unattractive style of play. Ongoing dissatisfaction at his management (along with the performance of the boardroom) from Sydney's core supporter group 'The Cove' culminated in protests with banners and chanting calling for his dismissal at their home game against Adelaide United on 8 February 2014. This was followed by an unprecedented walkout in protest at the ejection of one of their core members for their involvement in the banner, contrary to media reports claiming it was pre-meditated, and on 23 April 2014, Farina was sacked from Sydney FC.

=== Fiji ===
Following his sacking from Sydney FC, Farina sported contract offers from clubs in New Zealand, however signed as the technical adviser for the Fiji U-20s in the lead up to the 2015 FIFA U-20 World Cup. In January 2015 it was announced that Farina was to take over the full coaching role of the U-20s, in the lead up to the 2015 FIFA U-20 World Cup in New Zealand.

In October 2015, Farina was confirmed to take over from Juan Carlos Buzzetti as head coach of Fiji seniors in December. He was subsequently sacked from both the national team and the U-23 team following Fiji's performance at the 2016 Summer Olympics in Brazil.

== Other roles ==
In November 2021 Farina was appointed to the inaugural National Indigenous Advisory Group of Football Australia. The group aims at supporting and increasing Indigenous participation in the game.

== Personal life ==
Farina is of Italian and Torres Strait Islander descent, and is the uncle of footballer Zenon Caravella. He is married with two children. In 1998, he published his autobiography My World Is Round: A Personal Playing History (ghost written by Bonita Mersiades). In 2000, Farina was awarded a Medal of the Order of Australia for "service to soccer as a player and coach". In October 2009 Farina was interviewed by Monica Attard on ABC Radio's Sunday Profile where he discussed the drink driving charge and his dismissal and their effect on his family. Farina is the namesake of the Frank Farina Cup, which is contested between National Premier Leagues Queensland teams Northern Fury and Far North Queensland, with the trophy named in recognition of Farina's North Queensland origins, and his achievements as a player. Frank Farina’s son Jordan Farina is also a footballer who plays in the National Premier Leagues Queensland for Queensland Lions as an attacker.

== Honours ==
=== Player ===
Club Brugge

- Belgian League Championship: 1989–1990
- Belgian Cup: 1990–1991
- Belgian Supercup: 1990, 1991

Brisbane Strikers

- NSL Championship: 1996–1997

Marconi Fairfield

- NSL Championship: 1988

Sydney City

- NSL Cup: 1986

Personal honours

- FFA Hall of Champions Inductee – 2001
- Oceania Footballer of the Year: 1988
- Belgian League Top Scorer: 1989–1990
- NSL Player of the Year: 1987 with Marconi Fairfield
- NSL Player of the Year: 1988 with Marconi Fairfield
- NSL Top Scorer: 1987 with Marconi Fairfield – 16 goals
- NSL Top Scorer: 1988 with Marconi Fairfield – 16 goals

=== Manager ===
Australia

- OFC Nations Cup: 2000, 2004

With Brisbane Strikers:

- NSL Championship: 1996–1997

== International goals ==
Goals scored in 'A' internationals
No	Date	Venue	Opponent	Score	Result	Competition
1	9 June 1987	Gangneung Stadium	Morocco	0–1	0–1	1987 Presidents Cup
2	15 November 1987		Taiwan		0–3	1988 Olympic Games Qualifier
3	26 February 1988	Bruce Stadium, Canberra	Taiwan		3–0	1988 Olympic Games Qualifier
4	9 March 1988	Olympic Park, Melbourne	Israel	2–0	2–0	1988 Olympic Games Qualifier
5	13 March 1988	Sydney Football Stadium	New Zealand		3–1	1988 Olympic Games Qualifier
6	23 March 1988	Athletic Park, Wellington	New Zealand		1–1	1988 Olympic Games Qualifier
7	27 March 1988	Eden Park, Auckland	Taiwan		0–3	1988 Olympic Games Qualifier
8	9 July 1988	Parramatta Stadium	Saudi Arabia	2–0	3–0	Friendly
9	9 July 1988	Parramatta Stadium	Saudi Arabia	3–0	3–0	Friendly
10	18 September 1988	Gwangju Mudeung Stadium	(Socialist Federal Republic of Yugoslavia) Yugoslavia	1–0	1–0	1988 Olympic Games
11	15 August 1993	Sydney Football Stadium	Canada	1–0	2–1	1994 FIFA World Cup qualifier

Goals scored for Australia in 'B' internationals
No	Date	Venue	Opponent	Score	Result	Competition
1	13 June 1987	Daegu Civil Stadium	(Republic of Ireland) Shamrock Rovers	0–1	0–1	1987 Presidents Cup
2	15 June 1987	Suwon Civil Stadium	South Korea B	0–2	0–5	1987 Presidents Cup
3	15 June 1987	Suwon Civil Stadium	South Korea B	0–3	0–5	1987 Presidents Cup

== Managerial statistics ==
As of 28 March 2013.

Team	From	To	Record				
Team	From	To	G	W	D	L	Win %
Brisbane Roar	16 November 2006	14 October 2009	66	28	18	20	42.42
Papua New Guinea	12 February 2011	15 November 2012	7	2	2	3	28.57
Sydney FC	28 November 2012	23 April 2014	47	19	8	20	40.43
Total			120	49	28	43	40.83
