= George Tiger =

American soccer player

Personal information
- Date of birth: July 17, 1959 (age 67)
- Place of birth: Doylestown, Pennsylvania, United States
- Height: 6 ft 2 in (1.88 m)
- Positions: Midfielder; forward

Youth career
- 1976–1980: Lafayette College

Senior career*
Years	Team	Apps	(Gls)
1981–1982	Pennsylvania Stoners		
1982–1985	Pittsburgh Spirit (indoor)	94	(19)
- * Club domestic league appearances and goals

George Tiger is a retired American soccer player who spent time in the American Soccer League and Major Indoor Soccer League.

Tiger attended Lafayette College where he played on the men's soccer team, alongside Mike Glynn, Barry Brown and Doug Ciabotti, from 1976 to 1980. He was the 1981 Charles L. Albert Award recipient as the most outstanding senior athlete at Lafayette College and is a member of the Lafayette Leopards Hall of Fame.

In 1981, Tiger signed with the Pennsylvania Stoners of the American Soccer League, playing at least two seasons with the team. In October 1982, the Pittsburgh Spirit of the Major Indoor Soccer League signed Tiger as a free agent. In February 1985, Tiger underwent arthroscopic surgery on his left knee. He played until 1985 with the Spirit. Tiger retired at the end of the season and returned to Philadelphia where he continues to play with local amateur teams. He is now Senior Vice President, Global Sales at eResearch Technology. He has been married to his wife, Therese, for 22 years and has two daughters, Allie and Samantha.
