= 1987 President's Cup International Football Tournament =

1987 President's Cup
Tournament details
- Host country: South Korea
- Dates: 8–21 June
- Teams: 12

Final positions
- Champions: South Korea (10th title)
- Runners-up: Australia

Tournament statistics
- Matches played: 33
- Goals scored: 74 (2.24 per match)
- Top scorer(s): (Australia) Frank Farina (4 goals)

The 1987 President's Cup International Football Tournament (Korean: 제16회 대통령배 국제축구대회) was the 16th competition of Korea Cup. The competition was held from 8 to 21 June 1987, and was won by South Korea for the tenth time, who defeated Australia in the final.

== Group stage ==
=== Group A ===
Pos	Team	Pld	W	D	L	GF	GA	GD	Pts	Qualification
1	South Korea	5	4	1	0	9	2	+7	9	Advance to knockout stage
2	Egypt	5	3	2	0	9	5	+4	8	Advance to knockout stage
3	Hungary XI	5	1	2	2	5	6	−1	4	
4	CD Español	5	1	2	2	6	9	−3	4	
5	United States	5	1	1	3	6	9	−3	3	
6	Thailand	5	0	2	3	3	7	−4	2	

Source: RSSSF
8 June 1987
12:00 KST

South Korea	1–0	Hungary XI
Kim Sam-soo 37'	Report

Dongdaemun Stadium, Seoul

8 June 1987
13:50 KST

Deportivo Español (Argentina)	1–0	Thailand
Castro 30'	Report

Dongdaemun Stadium, Seoul

8 June 1987
15:40 KST

Egypt	3–1	United States
Soliman 19', 88'; Abdel-Hamid 65'	Report	Hantak 57'

Dongdaemun Stadium, Seoul

10 June 1987
13:30 KST

Deportivo Español (Argentina)	2–2	United States
Cariaga 75'; Andrada 77'	Report	Murray 23'; Hantak 81'

Masan Stadium, Masan

10 June 1987
15:20 KST

Hungary XI	0–0	Thailand

Masan Stadium, Masan

10 June 1987
17:10 KST

South Korea	0–0	Egypt

Masan Stadium, Masan

The match was ceased in the 29th minute, because tear gas fired to disperse protesters by the police was spread into the stadium. It was finished without a rematch on demand of Egypt national team.

12 June 1987
16:00 KST

Egypt	1–1	Thailand

Busan Gudeok Stadium, Busan

12 June 1987
17:50 KST

Deportivo Español (Argentina)	1–1	Hungary XI

Busan Gudeok Stadium, Busan

12 June 1987
19:40 KST

United States	0–1	South Korea
	Report	Choi Sang-kook 31'

Busan Gudeok Stadium, Busan

14 June 1987
13:30 KST

Egypt	3–2	(Argentina) Deportivo Español
Abdelghani ?'; Gharib ?'; Ramadan ?'	Report	Castro ?'; Cariaga ?'

Daejeon Hanbat Sports Complex, Daejeon

14 June 1987
15:20 KST

Hungary XI	3–2	United States
Simon ?'; ? ?'; Borsányi ?'	Report	Sullivan ?'; Murray ?'

Daejeon Hanbat Sports Complex, Daejeon

14 June 1987
17:10 KST

South Korea	4–2	Thailand
Noh Soo-jin 14'; Kim Joo-sung 18'; Chung Hae-won 64'; Kim Sam-soo 79' (pen.)	Report	Thanis 63'; Wirapong 88'

Daejeon Hanbat Sports Complex, Daejeon

16 June 1987
13:30 KST

Hungary XI	1–2	Egypt
? 58'	Report	Abdel-Hamid 52'; Ramadan 64'

Cheongju Sports Complex, Cheongju

16 June 1987
15:20 KST

United States	1–0	Thailand
Hantak 42'

Cheongju Sports Complex, Cheongju

16 June 1987
17:10 KST

South Korea	3–0	(Argentina) Deportivo Español
Choi Soon-ho 14' (pen.); Choi Jin-han 17', 37'	Report

Cheongju Sports Complex, Cheongju

=== Group B ===
Pos	Team	Pld	W	D	L	GF	GA	GD	Pts	Qualification
1	Australia	5	4	1	0	10	1	+9	9	Advance to knockout stage
2	South Korea B	5	3	1	1	6	5	+1	7	Advance to knockout stage
3	Fortuna Sittard	5	1	3	1	5	8	−3	5	
4	Morocco	5	2	0	3	6	6	0	4	
5	Chile B	5	1	2	2	3	6	−3	4	
6	Shamrock Rovers	5	0	1	4	0	4	−4	1	

Source: RSSSF
9 June 1987
13:30 KST

Morocco	0–1	Australia
		Farina 55'

Gangneung Stadium, Gangneung

9 June 1987
15:20 KST

Shamrock Rovers (Republic of Ireland)	0–1	Chile B
	Report	González 8'

Gangneung Stadium, Gangneung

9 June 1987
17:10 KST

South Korea B	4–0	(Netherlands) Fortuna Sittard
Lee Tae-hyung 41'; Ham Hyun-gi 65'; Lee Hak-jong 88', 89'	Report

Gangneung Stadium, Gangneung

11 June 1987
13:30 KST

Chile B	0–2	Australia
		McDowall 74'; Arnold 84'

Gyeongju Civic Stadium, Gyeongju

11 June 1987
15:20 KST

Fortuna Sittard (Netherlands)	0–0	(Republic of Ireland) Shamrock Rovers

Gyeongju Civic Stadium, Gyeongju

11 June 1987
17:10 KST

Morocco	0–1	South Korea B
	Report	Ham Hyun-gi 64'

Gyeongju Civic Stadium, Gyeongju

13 June 1987
16:00 KST

Shamrock Rovers (Republic of Ireland)	0–1	Australia
		Farina 11'

Daegu Civic Stadium, Daegu

13 June 1987
17:50 KST

Fortuna Sittard (Netherlands)	3–2	Morocco

Daegu Civic Stadium, Daegu

13 June 1987
19:40 KST

South Korea B	0–0	Chile B

Daegu Civic Stadium, Daegu

15 June 1987
13:30 KST

South Korea B	0–5	Australia
		Yankos 20' (pen.); Farina 48', 61'; Crino 79'; Arnold 84'

Suwon Sports Complex, Suwon

15 June 1987
15:20 KST

Shamrock Rovers (Republic of Ireland)	0–1	Morocco
	Report	Mohamed 72'

Suwon Sports Complex, Suwon

15 June 1987
17:10 KST

Chile B	1–1	(Netherlands) Fortuna Sittard

Suwon Sports Complex, Suwon

17 June 1987
13:30 KST

Fortuna Sittard (Netherlands)	1–1	Australia
Boessen 14'	Report	Hunter 85'

Incheon Sungui Stadium, Incheon

17 June 1987
15:20 KST

Morocco	3–1	Chile B
Khairi ?', ?'; Laghrissi ?'	Report	González ?'

Incheon Sungui Stadium, Incheon

17 June 1987
17:10 KST

South Korea B	1–0	(Republic of Ireland) Shamrock Rovers
Ham Hyun-gi 31'	Report

Incheon Sungui Stadium, Incheon

== Knockout stage ==
=== Bracket ===
Semi-finals
19 June – Seoul
South Korea (a.e.t.)	3
South Korea B	1
19 June – Seoul
Australia (p)	0 (4)
Egypt	0 (3)

Final
21 June – Seoul
South Korea (p)	1 (5)
Australia	1 (4)

=== Semi-finals ===
19 June 1987
17:30 KST

South Korea	3–1 (a.e.t.)	South Korea B
Kim Yong-se 30' (pen.); Kim Sam-soo 92'; Chung Hae-won 116'	Report	Yoon Sung-hyo 2'

Seoul Olympic Stadium, Seoul

19 June 1987
19:20 KST

Egypt	0–0 (a.e.t.)	Australia
	Report
Penalties
Abdel-Hamid (penalty missed); Youssef (penalty missed)	3–4	(penalty missed) Crino

Seoul Olympic Stadium, Seoul

=== Final ===
21 June 1987
16:00 KST

South Korea	1–1 (a.e.t.)	Australia
Kim Pan-keun 72'	Report	Arnold 83'
Penalties
Chung Hae-won (penalty scored); Choi Soon-ho (penalty missed); Kim Pan-keun (penalty scored); Kim Sam-soo (penalty scored); Kim Joo-sung (penalty scored); Yeo Bum-kyu (penalty scored)	5–4	(penalty scored) Crino; (penalty scored) Yankos; (penalty scored) Davidson; (penalty missed) Farina; (penalty scored) Dunn; (penalty missed) Raskopoulos

Seoul Olympic Stadium, Seoul

== See also ==
- Korea Cup
- South Korea national football team results
