= Stanisław Terlecki =

Polish footballer

Personal information
- Full name: Stanisław Andrzej Terlecki
- Date of birth: 13 November 1955
- Place of birth: Warsaw, Poland
- Date of death: 28 December 2017 (aged 62)
- Place of death: Łódź, Poland
- Height: 1.77 m (5 ft 9 1/2 in)
- Positions: Midfielder; striker

Senior career*
Years	Team	Apps	(Gls)
1972–1973	Polonez Warsaw		
1973–1975	Gwardia Warsaw	47	(3)
1975–1981	ŁKS Łódź	133	(17)
1981–1983	Pittsburgh Spirit (indoor)	88	(139)
1983	Golden Bay Earthquakes	27	(11)
1983–1984	New York Cosmos (indoor)	24	(34)
1984	New York Cosmos	17	(4)
1984–1986	Pittsburgh Spirit (indoor)	62	(45)
1986–1988	ŁKS Łódź	40	(5)
1988–1989	Legia Warsaw	31	(6)
1989–1990	St. Louis Storm (indoor)	39	(24)
1991	ŁKS Łódź	4	(1)
1991–1993	Polonia Warsaw		

International career
1976–1980	Poland	29	(7)
- * Club domestic league appearances and goals

Stanisław Andrzej Terlecki (13 November 1955 – 28 December 2017) was a Polish footballer.

He played in the Major Indoor Soccer League (MISL) and North American Soccer League (NASL) from 1981 to 1990. Terlecki was a MISL Most Valuable Player recipient who scored 267 goals and recorded 179 assists in his 256-game career with the Pittsburgh Spirit, New York Cosmos, Golden Bay Earthquakes, and St. Louis Storm.

== Early life ==
Born in Warsaw, Poland, as the son of two university professors, Terlecki was a student of history, like his father, and earned a degree in the field from the University of Łódź. This made him the first team member among Polish footballers whose education was not centered exclusively in physical education.

== Career ==
Terlecki began his professional career at age 17 and played for three clubs in the Polish top division. He was first selected for the national team as a 21-year-old, but his career for Poland was cut short due to his staunch anti-communist activism off the field. Terlecki played a total of 29 games for the Poland national football team, scoring seven goals.

Terlecki achieved his greatest success with the MISL's Pittsburgh Spirit, a place where he was affectionately known as "Stan the Fran" (as in "the Franchise"), becoming the club's all-time top scorer. During the 1981–1982 season, he led the Spirit with 74 goals and 117 points in 43 games played and, along with the New York Arrows' Steve Zungul, was named the league's regular season MVP. Terlecki was also the Spirit's leading scorer during the 1982–1983 season with 65 goals and 105 points, making him only one of six players in MISL history to have back-to-back 100-point scoring seasons. Then, after spending the following season playing for the NASL's Golden Bay Earthquakes and New York Cosmos indoor and outdoor teams, Terlecki returned to the Pittsburgh Spirit in 1984–1985 and once again led the team in scoring with 39 goals and 71 points. He made the MISL All-Star Team in three of his four seasons with the Spirit (1981–1982, 1982–1983, and 1984–1985), in addition to the 1st Team MISL in 1981–1982, the 2nd Team MISL in 1982–1983, and the 2nd Team NASL in 1983–1984. Terlecki's time in Pittsburgh coincided with the height of popularity for the Major Indoor Soccer League and the Spirit, which regularly drew larger hometown crowds to the Civic Arena than the Pittsburgh Penguins of the National Hockey League (NHL) before the arrival of legendary superstar Mario Lemieux in 1984.

Another noteworthy period in Terlecki's soccer career was his brief stint with the New York Cosmos NASL indoor team during the 1983–1984 season. He made an immediate impact by earning consecutive league Player of the Week awards over the Christmas and New Year's holidays. Terlecki finished the regular season with 34 goals and 23 assists in 23 regular season matches and added another three goals and two assists during the Cosmos' playoff run to the final series, which included two goals and an assist in a thrilling 8–7 win over the Chicago Sting in the decisive third match of the teams' semifinal series. During the finals, however, the San Diego Sockers were successful in keeping Terlecki off the scoresheet by limiting the Polish star to only one assist, and this was believed to have been a major key to the team's three-game sweep over the Cosmos for the NASL Indoor championship that season.

Terlecki finished his playing career in Poland in 1993, but was never selected for a return to the national team. He retired after two seasons with Polonia Warsaw, helping the club achieve promotion to the first division for the first time in forty years.

In October 2019, Terlecki was posthumously inducted into the Indoor Soccer Hall of Fame, nearly two years after his death.

== Playing style ==
Terlecki was known for his effort and dribbling and shooting skills, including his speedy ability to score by using a short windup to take powerful shots with either of his size-6 feet. In a February 1982 Sports Illustrated magazine article, then-Pittsburgh Spirit forward and teammate Paul Child described Terlecki's shooting prowess by stating: "His leg movement is maybe a quarter of mine. It's like a metal leaf spring when you pull it back and let it go. 'Poing!' It's that quick."

== Political activism and controversies ==
Having already outraged the Polish soccer authorities by switching clubs from Gwardia Warszawa to Łódzki KS in 1975, Terlecki's ardent political views against the rampant totalitarianism in both his home country and the Soviet Union at the time drew attention during the 1978 World Cup competition. Though injured and unable to play in the tournament, Terlecki emerged as a television commentator and did not refrain from any opportunity to slip in sarcastic comments that were critical of communist ideology.

Terlecki was twice suspended by the Polish federation for attempting to form a players' union. In November 1980, he was one of the key figures involved in a public incident between coaches and players at a Polish airport. Later that same month, Terlecki arranged a meeting between Poland national team players and Pope John Paul II on a trip to Italy, despite warnings from the federation and government that such a meeting was forbidden.

Terlecki was eventually kicked off the Poland national team after standing up for a teammate who had gotten booted for violating team rules set forth by government and federation authorities. Terlecki then became heavily involved with the anti-communist Solidarity trade union and moved to Holland. While there, John Kowalski, a fellow Polish countryman who was the then-head coach of the Pittsburgh Spirit, helped Terlecki orchestrate a move of his family to Pittsburgh, Pennsylvania, and for him to sign with the team as a player.

In February 1982, Terlecki made the following comments about how grateful he was for the opportunities afforded to him in the U.S.: "For me, the most important thing is to be free. I decided to be a teacher 10 years ago. In Poland, I must be a teacher forever. Here, I can be a soccer player one year, a singer the next year. I can write in a newspaper another year, or maybe one year I am worker in factory. [Ronald] Reagan was an actor before he was President. In Poland, it is unbelievable."

== Personal life ==
Terlecki was married to wife Ewa and had two sons, Tomasz and Maciej. Due to the relaxation of political oppression in his native country over time, Terlecki returned to Poland with his family in 1986 and rejoined his former club, Łódzki KS. He would come back to the U.S. to play one final MISL season with the St. Louis Storm in 1990 before resettling in Poland for good in 1991. Following Terlecki's retirement from the playing field, it is reported that he remained involved in soccer thereafter by obtaining his coaching license and working with a high-level youth club in Poland.

== Death ==
Terlecki died in his home in Łódź on 28 December 2017, at age 62, according to a release from the Polish Football Association and multiple European news reports. Meanwhile, a Radio Poland report said Terlecki had been battling a long illness. Kowalski, who remained life-long friends with Terlecki, said he had spoken with a family member the day following the footballer's death and was told that Terlecki had died in his sleep, most likely from a heart condition or heart attack.

== Honours ==
Legia Warsaw

- Polish Cup: 1988–89

Individual

- Polish Newcomer of the Year: 1976

== See also ==
- Okęcie Airport incident
