= Mowlik-e Olya =

Mowlik-e Olya موليك عليا
- Village
- Location within Iran
- Coordinates: 39°29′51″N 44°43′55″E
- Country: Iran
- Province: West Azerbaijan
- County: Maku
- Bakhsh: Central
- Rural District: Chaybasar-e Jonubi

Population (2006)
  - Total: 186
- Time zone: UTC+3:30 (IRST)
  - Summer (DST): UTC+4:30 (IRDT)

Mowlik-e Olya (Persian: موليك عليا, also Romanized as Mowlīk-e ‘Olyā; also known as Mowlīk) is a village in Chaybasar-e Jonubi Rural District, in the Central District of Maku County, West Azerbaijan Province, Iran. At the 2006 census, its population was 186, in 31 families.
