= Kevin Maher (American soccer) =

American soccer player

Personal information
- Place of birth: Guilford, Connecticut, U.S.
- Position: Midfielder

Youth career
- 1979–1982: Yale University

Senior career*
Years	Team	Apps	(Gls)
1983–1986	Pittsburgh Spirit (indoor)	104	(16)
1986–1987	New York Express (indoor)	21	(2)
- * Club domestic league appearances and goals

Kevin Maher is an American retired soccer midfielder who spent four seasons in the Major Indoor Soccer League. He was the 1984–1985 MISL Rookie of the Year and a 1982 NCAA Division I first team All American.

== Youth ==
Maher played soccer from 1975 to 1978 at Guilford High School. He and his teammates won three consecutive state championships (1976–1978) and Maher was named a Parade Magazine High School All-America in 1978. He then attended Yale University, playing on the men's soccer team from 1979 to 1982. He was a 1981 second team and 1982 first team All American. In his four seasons with the Bulldogs, he scored 33 goals and added 11 assists. In 1983, he played with the U.S. U-23 national team at the 1983 Pan American Games.

== Professional ==
In 1983, the Pittsburgh Spirit selected Maher in the Major Indoor Soccer League draft. Maher joined the Pittsburgh Spirit of the Major Indoor Soccer League. He spent three seasons with the Spirit, winning 1983–1984 Rookie of the Year honors. In August 1986, the expansion New York Express announced they had signed Maher. The Express folded during the season and Maher retired from playing professionally.

He was inducted into the Connecticut Soccer Hall of Fame in 2008.
