= Pittsburgh Spirit =

- Full name: Pittsburgh Spirit
- Nickname: Spirit
- Founded: 1978
- Dissolved: 1986
- Ground: Civic Arena; Pittsburgh, Pennsylvania
- Capacity: 16,940
- Owner: (United States) Edward J. DeBartolo, Sr. (1981–86)
- League: Major Indoor Soccer League
Home colors	Away colors

Pittsburgh Spirit was an indoor soccer team based in Pittsburgh and one of the original six teams that played in the Major Indoor Soccer League (MISL). The Spirit was founded in 1978, suspended operation for the 1980–81 season, then returned to the MISL until owner Edward J. DeBartolo Sr. folded the team on April 11, 1986. In its seven seasons of play in Pittsburgh, the Spirit amassed an overall regular season win-loss record of 153–139, two postseason appearances, and an average regular season attendance of 6,351.

== 1981–82 ==
The Pittsburgh Spirit was reinstated into the MISL in 1981 after suspending operations the previous season. Stan Terlecki led the team with 74 goals, second in the MISL to Steve Zungul's (New York Arrows) 103 goals, and in points (total combined goals and assists) with 117. Both Terlecki and Zungul were named the MISL's regular season Most Valuable Player (MVP). Meanwhile, goalkeeper Krys Sobieski achieved a 4.20 goals-against average (GAA), the third lowest in the league.

The Spirit finished the regular season with a 31–13 record (including a franchise best .705 winning percentage), securing second place in the Eastern Division and a playoff berth. The team faced the third-place Baltimore Blast in the Division Semifinals. The Spirit won the first game of the playoffs 3–1, but would go on to lose the second contest 6–5 in overtime and the series' third and final game 4–2, eliminating the Spirit from further postseason play.

== 1982–83 ==
The Spirit were unable to repeat its previous season's success and played .500 soccer for the 1982–83 season (24–24). Despite its mediocre regular season record, the team very narrowly missed the playoffs. Stan Terlecki once again led the Spirit in goals (65) and points (105), and forward Paul Child finished in the top 25 in points (68). Krys Sobieski played at a sub-.500 goalkeeping level, going 19–20 and watched his GAA fall to 4.88.

== 1983–84 ==
The Spirit enjoyed its winningest regular season ever in 1983–84, going 32–16 despite losing two-time leading scorer Terlecki to the Golden Bay Earthquakes. The Spirit's average attendance peaked during this season, drawing 8,000 fans. By comparison, the National Hockey League's (NHL) Pittsburgh Penguins averaged around 6,000 during the same season. Zeee Kapka led the Spirit offense with 66 points and former first round draft pick goalkeeper Joe Papaleo forged a 16–8 record with a 4.12 GAA. Kevin Maher would earn the honor of MISL Rookie Of The Year. Though the Spirit finished in second place in the Eastern Division and made the postseason, it would lose to the Cleveland Force in the Division Semifinals three games to one by scores of 6-4 (loss), 4-1 (win), 6-5 (OT loss), and 5-3 (loss), respectively.

== 1984–85 ==
Two-time former leading scorer Stan Terlecki returned to the team, but the Spirit finished in sixth place ten games under .500, going 19–29. Terlecki led the team with 39 goals and 66 points, while goalkeeper Peter Mowlik finished the season 11–13 with a 4.71 GAA.

== 1985–86 ==
The 1985–1986 season would be the final season for the Pittsburgh Spirit in the MISL. Although the team finished only four games out of first place in the Eastern Division, it also finished in last place with a record of 23–25. Goaltender David Brcic was named to the All-MISL team. After the season's completion, the Pittsburgh Spirit franchise folded.

== Return ==
There was an attempt to revive the Spirit for the final Major Soccer League season, but it did not come to be. An ownership group known as Pittsburgh Soccer Inc. was approved to operate the Major Soccer League expansion team for three years.

== Staff ==
- General Manager – Chris Wright

== Former players ==
- (United States) Angelo Albanese (1978–79)
- (United States) David Brcic (1985–86) 43 Apps 0 Goals
- (England) Steve Buttle (1979–80) 28 Apps 35 Goals
- (England) Micky Cave (1981–84)
- (England) Clive Charles (1982)
- (United States) (England) Paul Child (1981–86) 133 Apps 140 Goals
- (Scotland) Alfie Conn (1979–80)
- (United States) John Dolinsky (1978–79) 22 Apps 16 Goals
- (Germany) Helmut Dudek (1985–86)
- (Socialist Federal Republic of Yugoslavia) Drago Dumbovic (1983–84) 37 Apps 32 Goals
- (United States) David Egan
- (Canada) Charlie Falzon (1985–86)
- (Scotland) Graham Fyfe (1979–80) 31 Apps 37 Goals
- (United States) Charley Greene (1984–86)
- (Socialist Federal Republic of Yugoslavia) (Croatia) Fred Grgurev (1985–86)
- (England) David Hoggan (1984–86)
- (England) Godfrey Ingram (1985–86)
- (England) Tommy Jenkins
- (Poland) Zdzisław Kapka (1983–86) 45 Apps 30 Goals
- (United States) (Romania) Erhardt Kapp (1984–86)
- (United States) Nicky Klinarski (1985–86)
- (Brazil) Marcio Leite (1984–86)
- (United States) (Socialist Federal Republic of Yugoslavia) Mark Liveric (1985–86)
- (United States) Joseph Luxbacher (1978–80) scored first goal in franchise history
- (United States) Dave MacKenzie (1984–85)
- (Scotland) Pat McCluskey (1982–83)
- (Scotland) David McNiven (1984–85)
- (United States) Kevin Maher (1983–86)
- (United States) Peter Mannos (1978–79) 16 Apps 0 Goals
- (United States) Alan Mayer (1979–80) 17 Apps 0 Goals
- (United States) Shep Messing (1984–85)
- (United States) Joe Mihaljevic (1982–86)
- (Poland) Piotr Mowlik (1984–86) 27 Apps 0 Goals
- (United States) Bill Nichol (1981–82) 44 Apps 26 Goals
- (United States) Sid Nolan (1978–79) 23 Apps 21 Goals
- (United States) John O'Hara (1981–86)
- (Poland) Grzegorz Ostalczyk (1981–85)
- (United States) Joe Papaleo (1983–84) 25 Apps 0 Goals
- (United States) Art Rex (1979–80)
- (South Africa) Nathan Sacks (1982)
- (United States) Dave Sarachan (1978–79) 23 Apps 23 Goals
- (Poland) Krzysztof Sobieski (1981–83) 70 Apps 0 Goals
- (Poland) Janusz Sybis (1983–86) 42 Apps 35 Goals
- (Poland) Stanisław Terlecki "Stan the Man" (1981–83) 88 Apps 139 Goals (1984–85) 39 Apps 39 Goals
- (United States) George Tiger (1984–85) 93 Apps 19 Goals
- (Poland) Adam Topolski (1984–86)
- (United States) Keith Tozer (1981–84) 85 Apps 8 Goals
- (United States) Val Tuska (1985–86)
- (United States) Bobby Vosmaer (1984–85)
- (United States) Roger Wynter (1984–85)

== Former coaches ==
- (United States) Bruno Schwarz (1978–79)
- (Scotland) Alex Pringle (1979)
- (United States) Len Bilous (1979–80)
- (United States) John Kowalski (1981–85)
- (Socialist Federal Republic of Yugoslavia) (United States) Don Popovic (1985–1986)

== Individual honours ==
MISL MVP

- 1981–1982 – Stan Terlecki (jointly held)

MISL All-Star Team

- 1981–1982 – Stan Terlecki
- 1985–1986 – David Brcic

MISL Rookie of the Year

- 1983–1984 – Kevin Maher

Coach of the Year

- 1979–80 – Len Bilous (jointly held)
