= Mariusz Mowlik =

Polish footballer (born 1981)

Personal information
- Full name: Mariusz Mowlik
- Date of birth: 19 May 1981 (age 45)
- Place of birth: Poznań, Poland
- Height: 1.84 m (6 ft 1/2 in)
- Position: Defender

Youth career
- Lech Poznań
- SKS 13 Poznań
- 1922 Lechia Kostrzyn
- Polonia Środa Wielkopolska
- Sokół Pniewy
- Patria Buk

Senior career*
Years	Team	Apps	(Gls)
1999–2006	Lech Poznań	56+	(2+)
2003	→ Polonia Warsaw (loan)	12	(0)
2006	Dyskobolia Grodzisk	1	(0)
2006	Austria Lustenau	12	(0)
2007	Egaleo F.C.	0	(0)
2008	Polonia Warsaw	7	(1)
2008–2011	ŁKS Łódź	66	(9)
2011–2014	Miedź Legnica	36	(3)

International career
2004	Poland	1	(0)
- * Club domestic league appearances and goals

Mariusz Mowlik (born 19 May 1981) is a Polish former professional footballer who played as a defender. Besides Poland, he has played in Austria and Greece. He is currently the co-owner of 11-Football Players agency.

== Club career ==
His football career began in Poznań. He attended a football school SKS 13 Poznań. After graduating, he played in such clubs as 1922 Lechia Kostrzyn, Polonia Środa Wielkopolska, Sokół Pniewy and Patria Buk.

In 1999, he joined Lech Poznań. In 2003, he was loaned out to Polonia Warsaw. After returning to Poznań, he became a regular at Lech for the next three seasons and won the Polish Cup with the team in the 2003–04 season.

In mid-2006, he signed with Dyskobolia Grodzisk Wielkopolski. After just one league appearance, he left the club to join Austrian second division team SC Austria Lustenau. In 2007, he signed a contract with PAE Aigaleo in the Super League Greece. In early 2008, FIFA terminated his contract with the Greek club.

Mowlik returned to Poland and signed a contract with second-division then Polonia Warsaw. From 2008 until 2011 he represented ŁKS Łódź. In the 2010–11 season, Mariusz led ŁKS to promotion to Ekstraklasa as team captain. He was released on 6 June 2011.

On 13 June 2011, he joined Miedź Legnica. After retiring, he held the role of sporting director until April 2017.

In 2018 he opened a sport agency, 11-Football Players, which represents footballers from all over the world.

== International career ==
His sole appearance for the Poland national team came on 12 July 2004, when he played the entirety of a 1–1 draw with the United States in Chicago.

== Personal life ==
He is the son of Piotr Mowlik, ex-footballer, goalkeeper and national team player and cousin of professional player David Topolski.

== Honours ==
Lech Poznań

- I liga: 2001–02
- Polish Cup: 2003–04

ŁKS Łódź

- I liga: 2010–11

Miedź Legnica

- II liga West: 2011–12
