= Greg Villa =

American soccer player

Personal information
- Full name: Gregory Villa
- Date of birth: December 15, 1956 (age 69)
- Place of birth: St. Louis, Missouri, United States
- Position: Forward

Youth career
- 1973–1974: Mehlville High School
- 1975: Busch Soccer Club

College career
Years	Team	Apps	(Gls)
1975–1976	SIU Edwardsville Cougars		

Senior career*
Years	Team	Apps	(Gls)
1977–1979	Minnesota Kicks	23	(2)
1978	Minnesota Kicks (indoor)	1	(0)
1979	Tulsa Roughnecks	8	(2)
1980	Fort Lauderdale Strikers	13	(1)
1980–1982	St. Louis Steamers (indoor)	43	(30)
1982–1984	Kansas City Comets (indoor)	51	(26)
1983	Team America	6	(2)
1985–1986	St. Louis Steamers (indoor)	16	(1)
Total		161	(64)

International career
1977–1980	United States	18	(5)
- * Club domestic league appearances and goals

Gregory Villa is an American former soccer forward who played professionally in the North American Soccer League and Major Indoor Soccer League. He earned eighteen caps, scoring five goals, with the United States men's national soccer team between 1977 and 1980.

== Youth ==
Villa grew up in Saint Louis, Missouri, where he attended Mehlville High School from 1971 to 1975. He also played for the Busch Soccer Club as a youth player. Villa attended Southern Illinois University Edwardsville. In 1975, he scored 9 goals and assisted on 8 others. The next season, he led the team with 14 goals.

== Professional ==
Villa played for the Minnesota Kicks from 1977 to 1979. The Strikers traded Villa to the Tulsa Roughnecks only a few games into the 1979 season. At the end of the season, the Roughnecks traded him to the Fort Lauderdale Strikers for the 1980 season. At the completion of the 1980 NASL season, he signed with the St. Louis Steamers of Major Indoor Soccer League (MISL). He played two seasons with the Steamers before trying out for Team America after being waived by the Chicago Sting without playing a game with them. In 1983, the U.S. Soccer Federation entered the U.S. national team in NASL. Team America ended the season 10–20 and USSF withdrew it from the league at the end of the season. Villa played one more season with the Steamers in 1985–1986.

== National team ==
Villa earned eighteen caps with the national team from 1977 to 1980. His first game with the national team came in a September 15, 1977, victory over El Salvador. Villa scored in the game, putting him in the company of about a dozen U.S. players who have scored in their debut with the national team. Villa went on to play nearly every national team game during the next three years. He also was a member of the U.S. Olympic Soccer Team which qualified for the 1980 Summer Olympics. However, due to President Carter's boycott of the games, held in the Soviet Union, Villa did not play in the Olympics
