= Erhardt Kapp =

Romanian-American soccer player

Personal information
- Date of birth: June 16, 1959 (age 67)
- Place of birth: Fântânele, Arad County, Romania
- Height: 5 ft 11 in (1.80 m)
- Position: Defender

Youth career
- Blau-Weiss Gottschee
- 1977–1980: Connecticut

Senior career*
| Years | Team | Apps | (Gls) |
| 1981–1983 | New York Cosmos | 20 | (1) |
| 1981–1982 | New York Cosmos (indoor) | 17 | (2) |
| 1983–1986 | Pittsburgh Spirit (indoor) | 106 | (14) |
| 1986–1988 | Los Angeles Lazers (indoor) | 50 | (8) |

International career
| 1983–1985 | United States | 5 | (1) |
- * Club domestic league appearances and goals

Erhardt Kapp (born June 16, 1959, in Romania) is a retired soccer defender and current business owner and soccer coach. Born in Romania, he was a member of the 1984 U.S. Olympic soccer team and U.S. national team.

== Career ==
Kapp as a youth played for the New York-based Kolping Soccer Club and Blau-Weiss Gottschee. Kapp attended the University of Connecticut from 1977 to 1980, where he played on the men's soccer team and became one of the most decorated players ever at UConn under Joe Morrone. He was named a first team All American in 1981. He was also a second-team All American in 1980 and earned honorable mention in 1978.

The New York Cosmos under head coach Hennes Weisweiler of the North American Soccer League (NASL) selected Kapp with the fourth pick in the first round of the 1981 NASL College Draft. He played with the Cosmos and was a teammate of players Franz Beckenbauer, Carlos Alberto, Giorgio Chinaglia, Vladislav Bogićević and Johan Neeskens until the end of the 1983. They were Soccer Bowl finalists in 1981 and won the championship in 1982. Besides competing in the North American Soccer League, the Cosmos traveled all over the world playing against world-class teams in Asia, South America, Central America, Africa and Europe. On November 16, 1983, the Cosmos released Kapp and several other teammates because of salary constraints and downsizing of the club. In December 1983, Kapp signed with the Pittsburgh Spirit of the Major Indoor Soccer League (MISL). After the Spirit folded, he moved to the Los Angeles Lazers in 1986 along with former Cosmos and Olympic teammate David Brcic and remained with the team through 1990.

Kapp also was a member of the U.S. Olympic soccer team at the 1984 Summer Olympics, where he started all three games under coach Alkis Panagoulias. The 3–0 win over Costa Rica was attended by 78,265 fans in Palo Alto, California. The U.S. went 1–1–1, beating Costa Rica 3–0, losing 1–0 to Italy, and tying Egypt 1–1. They failed to make it to the second round despite playing with professional players.

Kapp also earned five caps with the U.S. national team between 1983 and 1985. The national team did not play many games during that period. His first cap came in the only U.S. game in 1983, a 2–0 win over Haiti. Kapp came on for Alan Merrick. He then played three games in 1984, scoring in a 4–0 blowout of the Netherlands Antilles. His last cap came on May 15, 1985, in a victory over Trinidad and Tobago. The U.S. national team did not qualify for the 1986 World Cup in Mexico.

He owns a soccer retail store in Mamaroneck, New York. He also coaches and runs summer soccer camps in Westchester, New York.

Kapp's son, Alex Kapp was also a soccer player.
