= Piotr Mowlik =

Polish footballer (born 1951)

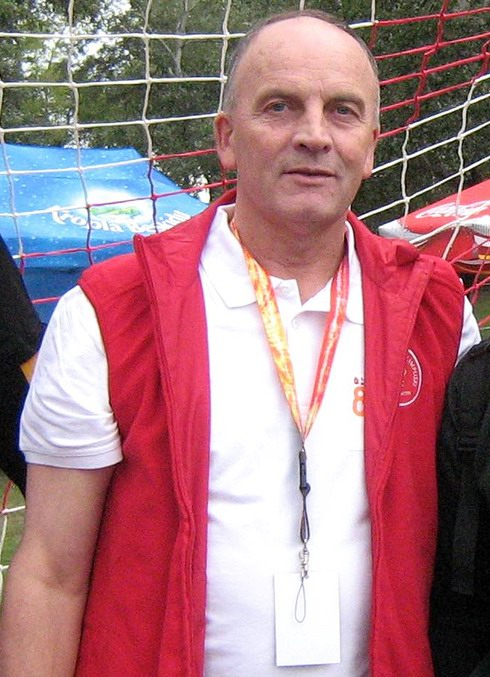

Personal information
- Date of birth: 21 April 1951 (age 75)
- Place of birth: Rybnik, Poland
- Height: 5 ft 10 in (1.78 m)
- Position: Goalkeeper

Youth career
- 1964–1965: LZS Orzepowice

Senior career*
Years	Team	Apps	(Gls)
1965–1970	ROW Rybnik		
1970	Unia Racibórz		
1971–1977	Legia Warsaw	131	(0)
1977–1983	Lech Poznań	153	(0)
1983–1986	Pittsburgh Spirit (indoor)	52	(0)
1986–1987	Tacoma Stars (indoor)	32	(0)

International career
1974–1981	Poland	21	(0)

Managerial career
- 2001–2003: Tur Turek
- 2005–2006: Mieszko Gniezno
Medal record
Men's football
Representing Poland
FIFA World Cup
Bronze medal – third place	1982 Spain
Olympic Games
Silver medal – second place	1976 Montréal	Team
- * Club domestic league appearances and goals

Piotr Mowlik (born 21 April 1951) is a Polish former professional footballer who played as a goalkeeper.

== Career ==
=== Club ===
In 1965, Mowlik began as an apprentice with LZS Orzepowice. In 1966, he signed as a professional with ROW Rybnik where he played until 1970. That year, he also briefly played for Unia Racibórz. In 1971, he joined Legia Warsaw where he played 131 games. He then transferred to Lech Poznań in 1977. In 1983, he moved to the United States where he joined the Pittsburgh Spirit of the Major Indoor Soccer League. He spent the 1985–86 season behind starter David Brcic, appearing in just one game. On 1 March 1986, the Spirit sold his contract to the Tacoma Stars and he played his first game in Tacoma four days later.

=== National ===
He earned 21 caps for the Poland national team between 1974 and 1981. In 1982 he was an unused sub at the 1982 FIFA World Cup, where Poland won the bronze medal. With the Polish Olympic team, back then usually with the same squad as the full national side, Mowlik participated at the 1976 Summer Olympics, where Poland won the silver medal in the football tournament. He was brought into the gold medal match for the usual starting goalie Jan Tomaszewski after 19 minutes when eventual winner East Germany was already up 2-0.

=== International ===
Appearances, conceded goals and clean sheets by national team
National team	Year	Apps	Conceded Goals	Clean Sheets
Poland	1974	1	0	1
Poland	1975	1	1	0
Poland	1976	2	1	1
Poland	1977	0	0	0
Poland	1978	0	0	0
Poland	1979	1	0	1
Poland	1980	13	12	5
Poland	1981	3	2	2
Total		21	16	10

== Personal life ==
He is the father of professional footballer Mariusz Mowlik and uncle of professional footballer David Topolski.

== Honours ==
Legia Warsaw

- Polish Cup: 1972–73

Lech Poznań

- Ekstraklasa: 1982–83
- Polish Cup: 1981–82

Poland

- Olympic silver medal: 1976
- FIFA World Cup third place: 1982

Individual

- Lech Poznań All-time XI
