= Ted Hantak =

American soccer player

Personal information
- Date of birth: March 7, 1962 (age 64)
- Place of birth: St. Louis, Missouri, United States
- Height: 6 ft 1 in (1.85 m)
- Position: Forward

College career
Years	Team	Apps	(Gls)
1984–1985	UMSL Tritons		

Senior career*
Years	Team	Apps	(Gls)
1986–1988	Memphis Storm (indoor)	42	(45)
1988	Baltimore Blast (indoor)	7	(2)
1988–1989	Memphis Storm (indoor)		
1989	Milwaukee Wave (indoor)	19	(7)
–1994	St. Louis Kutis S.C.		

International career
1987	United States	3	(2)
- * Club domestic league appearances and goals

Ted Hantak is a retired United States soccer forward who earned three caps, scoring two goals, with the United States men's national soccer team in 1987.

== College ==
Hantak attended the University of Missouri–St. Louis (UMSL) where he played Division II NCAA men's soccer in 1984 and 1985. Hantak was an outstanding forward, who scored 13 goals during his freshman season. UMSL lost to Seattle Pacific University in the NCAA Division II championship semifinals in 1984. Hantak continued his scoring pace as a sophomore, with 17 goals. UMSL lost to Florida International in the second round of the tournament in 1985. The irony is that Florida International University won the championship 1984, and that Seattle Pacific won the championship in 1985. Hantak was All Conference in 1984 and 1985, and he was a 1985 Second Team All-American. He left the school after his sophomore year. He was ranked fourth in career goals (30) and fourth in career points with 71, coming from his 30 goals and 11 assists.

== Professional ==
The Dallas Sidekicks of the Major Indoor Soccer League drafted Hantak in the first round (12th overall), on 2 June 1986. He was cut during the pre-season training camp, and he moved to the St. Louis Steamers for a tryout. The St. Louis Steamers released Hantak on 4 November 1986. He signed with the Memphis Storm in the American Indoor Soccer Association. He scored 45 goals in 42 games with the Storm during two seasons. He left from the Storm for personal reasons in the spring of 1988. He joined the Baltimore Blast of the MISL on 3 March 1988, as the team was preparing for the playoffs. Hantak returned to the Storm for the 1988–1989 season, playing in 23 games. He earned All AISA honors, placing second in the league with 21 goals, and fourth in total points which came from his 21 goals and 10 assists. the team sent him to the Milwaukee Wave in January 1988, however, as a cost-cutting move. The Chicago Power bought his contract from the Wave on 14 September 1989. There are no indications that he played for the Power. Hantak spent several years with the amateur St. Louis Kutis S.C., before retiring in 1995.

== National team ==
Hantak debuted with the United States men's national soccer team, in a 3–1 loss to Egypt on 8 June, at the 1987 President's Cup in South Korea. Hantak became one of the few U.S. players to score in his debut with the national team. Hantak played in the next two U.S. games in the cup: a 1–0 loss to South Korea, and a 1–0 victory over Thailand. Hantak scored the winning goal against Thailand, giving him 2 goals in his first 3 national team games. These ended up being his only goals games with the full national team. He never played again for the senior team for some reason.

Hantak played in two games for the US, in the 1987 Pan American Games. Those two matches were not recognized by FIFA as full internationals. Hantak never played in a full international game again. He scored another two goals, both in a

3-to-1 victory over Trinidad and Tobago. His last game with any of the U.S. national teams came on September 5 when he came on as a 65th-minute substitute for Frank Klopas in a 4–1 victory over Trinidad and Tobago in an Olympic qualifier. He finished his national team career with 6 games (5 as a starter) and 4 goals.
