= Soccer America College Team of the Century =

The Soccer America College Team of the Century were chosen by the editors of the American periodical Soccer America to comprise, as one men's and one women's eleven-member side divided each as one goalkeeper, three defenders, four midfielders, and three forwards, the best players of collegiate association football in the United States of the 20th century CE.

== Men ==
=== Player of the Century ===
Concomitant to the selection of the Men's Team of the Century was that of the male player of the century; University of Virginia Cavaliers midfielder Claudio Reyna, a Division I first-team All America in each of his three collegiate seasons, a two-time recipient of the Missouri Athletic Club Player of the Year and Soccer America Player of the Year Awards, and the 1993 Hermann Trophy winner, was so chosen by Soccer America.

=== Team of the Century ===
Position	Player	Team represented	Seasons played	Awards won	National championships won
Goalkeeper	Brad Friedel	UCLA Bruins	1990–1992	Hermann Trophy (1992); ISAA Goalkeeper of the Year (1992); Division I first-team All America (1991, 1992)	1990
Defender	Erik Imler	Virginia Cavaliers	1989–1992	None	1989, 1991, 1992
Defender	Paul Caligiuri	UCLA Bruins	1982–1983, 1985–1986	Soccer America Player of the Year (1986); Division I first-team All America (1985, 1986)	1985
Defender	Adubarie Otorubio	Clemson Tigers	1981–1984	Division I first-team All America (1982, 1984)	1984
Midfielder	Andy Atuegbu	San Francisco Dons	1974–1977	Division I first-team All America (1976)	1975, 1976
Midfielder	Claudio Reyna	Virginia Cavaliers	1991–1993	Hermann Trophy (1993); Missouri Athletic Club Player of the Year (1992, 1993); Soccer America Player of the Year (1992, 1993); Division I first-team All America (1991, 1992, 1993)	1991, 1992, 1993
Midfielder	Mike Fisher	Virginia Cavaliers	1993–1996	Hermann Trophy (1995, 1996); Missouri Athletic Club Player of the Year (1996); NSCAA Player of the Year (Division I; 1996); Soccer America Player of the Year (1995); Division I first-team All America (1995, 1996)	1993, 1994
Midfielder	Bruce Murray	Clemson Tigers	1984–1987	Hermann Trophy (1987); ISAA Player of the Year (1987); Division I first-team All America (1985, 1987)	1984, 1987
Forward	Angelo DiBernardo	Indiana Hoosiers	1976–1978	Hermann Trophy (1978); Division I first-team All America (1977)	None
Forward	Ken Snow	Indiana Hoosiers	1987–1990	Hermann Trophy (1988, 1990); Missouri Athletic Club Player of the Year (1988, 1990); Division I first-team All America (1987, 1988, 1989, 1990)	1988
Forward	Porfirio Armando Betancourt	Indiana Hoosiers	1979–1981	Hermann Trophy (1981); Division I first-team All America (1979, 1981)	None

== Women ==
=== Player of the Century ===
Concomitant to the selection of the Women's Team of the Century was that of the female player of the century; North Carolina Tar Heels forward Mia Hamm, a Division I first-team All America in her final three collegiate seasons, a two-time recipient of the Hermann Trophy and the ISAA Player of the Year and Soccer America Player of the Year Awards, and with the Tar Heels four times a National Collegiate Athletic Association Division I champion, was so chosen.

=== Team of the Century ===
Position	Player	Team represented	Seasons played	Awards won	National championships won
Goalkeeper	Kim Maslin	George Mason Patriots	1983–1986	None	1985
Defender	Carla Werden	North Carolina Tar Heels	1986–1989	Division I first-team All America (1987, 1988)	1986, 1987, 1988, 1989
Defender	Debbie Belkin	Massachusetts Minutewomen	1984–1987	Division I first-team All America (1985, 1986, 1987)	None
Defender	Sara Whalen	Connecticut Huskies	1994–1997	NSCAA Player of the Year (1997); Soccer America Player of the Year (1997); Division I first-team All America (1995, 1996, 1997)	None
Midfielder	Kristine Lilly	North Carolina Tar Heels	1989–1992	Hermann Trophy (1991); ISAA Player of the Year (1991); Soccer America Player of the Year (1990); Division I first-team All America (1989, 1990, 1991, 1992)	1989, 1990, 1991, 1992
Midfielder	Shannon Higgins	North Carolina Tar Heels	1986–1989	Hermann Trophy (1989); ISAA Player of the Year (1989); Soccer America Player of the Year (1988, 1989); Division I first-team All America (1988, 1989)	1986, 1987, 1988, 1989
Midfielder	Michelle Akers	Central Florida Knights	1984, 1986–1988	Hermann Trophy (1988); ISAA Player of the Year (1988); Soccer America Player of the Year (1987); Division I first-team All America (1984, 1988)	None
Midfielder	Julie Foudy	Stanford Cardinal	1989–1992	Soccer America Player of the Year (1991); Division I first-team All America (1990, 1991, 1992)	None
Forward	April Heinrichs	North Carolina Tar Heels	1983–1986	ISAA Player of the Year (1986); Soccer America Player of the Year (1986); Division I first-team All America (1984, 1985, 1986)	1983, 1985, 1986
Forward	Carin Jennings	UC Santa Barbara Gauchos	1983–1987	None	None
Forward	Mia Hamm	North Carolina Tar Heels	1989–1990, 1992–1993	Hermann Trophy (1992, 1993); ISAA Player of the Year (1992, 1993); Soccer America Player of the Year (1992, 1993); Division I first-team All America (1990, 1992, 1993)	1989, 1990, 1991, 1992
