= List of NCAA Division I men's soccer First-Team All-America teams =

The Division I First-Team All-Americans are the best eleven Division I U.S. college soccer players as selected by United Soccer Coaches.

== 1970–1983 ==
From 1970 to 1983 the NCSAA only named defenders and forwards in addition to one goalkeeper.

* – repeat selection

Year	Goalkeeper	Defenders	Forwards
1970	Bill Nuttall (Davis & Elkins)	Buzz Demling (Michigan State); Alan Harte (Quincy University); Nick Iwanik (UIC); Gerardo Pagnani (Eastern Illinois); Aladin Rodrigues (San Jose State)	Al Henderson (Howard); Richard Parkinson (Akron); Randy Smith (Buffalo State); Stan Startzell (Penn); Al Trost (Saint Louis)
1971	Cal Kern (Buffalo State)	Alan Harte* (Quincy University); Gerardo Pagnani* (Eastern Illinois); John Schneider (Quincy University); Andy Smiles (Ohio); William Smyth (Davis & Elkins)	Keith Aqui (Howard); Al Henderson* (Howard); Richard Parkinson* (Akron); Mike Seerey (Saint Louis); John Moore (Brockport)
1972	Bob Rigby (East Stroudsburg)	Chris Bahr (Penn State); Gordon Cholmondeley (Philadelphia); Alan Harte* (Quincy University); Gerardo Pagnani* (Eastern Illinois); Hans Wango (Davis & Elkins)	Ian Bain (Howard); Eugene Durham (Philadelphia Textile); Tom Kazembe (Wooster); Chris Papagianis (Harvard); Andy Rymarczuk (Penn State)
1973	Frank Tusinski (UMSL)	David D'Errico (Hartwick); Kip Jordan (Cornell); Kevin Missey (UMSL); Farrukh Quraishi (Oneonta State); Ferdinand Treusacher (Brown)	Henry Abadi (Clemson); Chris Bahr* (Penn State); Steve Baumann (Penn); Dale Russell (Philadelphia Textile); Tom Kazembe* (Wooster)
1974	Peter Mannos (NIU)	Jesse Cox (Loyola); Bruce Hudson (Saint Louis); John Nusum (Philadelphia Textile); Farrukh Quraishi* (Oneonta State); Mickey Rooney (Keene State)	Chris Bahr* (Penn State); Frantz Innocent (UConn); Tom Kazembe* (Wooster); Dale Russell* (Philadelphia Textile); Fred Pereira (Brown)
1975	Peter Mannos* (NIU)	Sam Bick (Quincy University); Nimrod Dreyfus (Adelphi); Greg Makowski (SIUE); John Nusum* (Philadelphia Textile); Dale Rothe (Baltimore)	Carlos Merchan (Fairleigh Dickinson); George Nanchoff (Akron); Steve Ralbovsky (Brown); Dale Russell* (Philadelphia Textile); Elson Seale (Philadelphia Textile)
1976	Dragan Radovich (St. Francis)	Carl Christensen (Vermont); George Gorleku (Eastern Illinois); Paul Hunter (UConn); Greg Makowski* (SIUE); Glenn Myernick (Hartwick)	Andy Atuegbu (San Francisco); Ty Keough (Saint Louis); George Nanchoff* (Akron); Louis Nanchoff (Akron); Fred Pereira* (Brown)
1977	Dragan Radovich* (St. Francis)	Greg Makowski* (SIUE); John Nusum* (Philadelphia Textile); Adrian Brooks (Philadelphia Textile); Herve Guilliod (Fredonia); Billy Gazonas (Hartwick)	Angelo DiBernardo (Indiana); Emilio John (Quincy University); Paul Milone (Princeton); John Maciel (Western Illinois); Rich Reice (Penn State)
1978	Dragan Radovich* (St. Francis)	George Gorleku* (Eastern Illinois); Adrian Brooks* (Philadelphia Textile); Greg Ryan (SMU); Ty Keough* (Saint Louis); Barry Nix (Columbia)	Raymond Ford (UM-Baltimore); George Lesyw (Temple); Peter Notaro (Loyola); Jim Stamatis (Penn State); Ole Mikkelsen (UCLA)
1979	Randy Phillips (SMU)	Saeid Baghvardani (SMU); Mike Freitag (Indiana); Barry Nix* (Columbia); Gerry Reardon (Adelphi); John Young (Hartwick)	Armando Betancourt (Indiana); Steve Charles (Columbia); Clyde O'Garro (St. Francis); Ray Taylor (Western Illinois)
1980	Randy Phillips* (SMU)	Saeid Baghvardani* (SMU); Tim Gagan (Lock Haven); Erhardt Kapp (UConn); Joe Morrone (Jr.) (UConn); Kevin Murphy (Rhode Island)	Trevor Adair (Lock Haven); Chico Borja (NJIT); Damien Kelly (Eastern Illinois); Kemal Khilian (SMU); Robert Meschbach (Indiana)
1981	Skip Gilbert (Vermont)	Dan Canter (Penn State); Richard Chinapoo (LIU Brooklyn); Tom Groark (SIUE); Tom McDonald (Philadelphia Textile); Barry Nix* (Columbia)	Armando Betancourt* (Indiana); Pedro DeBrito (UConn); John Hayes (Saint Louis); Damien Kelly* (Eastern Illinois); Agyeman Prempeh (Eastern Illinois)
1982	Skip Gilbert* (Vermont)	Lou Karbiener (Penn State); Erik Nelson (San Francisco); Adubarie Otorubio* (Clemson); Joe Ulrich (Duke)	Matthew English (Akron); Tom Killeen (Philadelphia Textile); Kevin Maher (Yale); Steve McLean (Philadelphia Textile); Neil Ridgway (Bowling Green); Roy Wegerle (South Florida)

== 1983–present ==
Beginning with the 1983 season, the NSCAA began naming midfielders in addition to forwards and defenders.
* – repeat selection
Scholar Player of the Year in bold

Year	Goalkeeper	Defenders	Midfielders	Forwards
1983	Jamie Swanner (Clemson)	Keith Flynn (UCR); David Masur (Rutgers); Simon Spelling (Akron); Cheche Vidal (Boston)	Michael Brady (American); Aidan McClusky (Fairleigh-Dickinson); Neil Ridgway* (Bowling Green)	Steve McLean* (Philadelphia Textile); Roy Wegerle* (South Florida); Tom Kain (Duke)
1984	Jeff Duback (Yale)	Albert Adabe (Eastern Illinois); Adubarie Otorubio* (Clemson); Shaun Pendleton (Akron)	Tony Bono (Drexel); Dale Ervine (UCLA); Aidan McCluskey* (Fairleigh-Dickinson)	John Gaffney (Virginia); Tom Kain* (Duke); Michael King (Fairleigh-Dickinson); Sam Okpodu (NC State)
1985	Tim Borer (Old Dominion)	Paul Caligiuri (UCLA); Shaun Pendleton* (Akron); Michael Reynolds (George Mason)	John Kerr Jr. (Duke); Mark Mettrick (Hartwick); Bruce Murray (Clemson)	Michael Brady* (American); Eric Eichmann (Clemson); Tom Kain* (Duke); Sam Sumo (George Mason)
1986	Jeff Duback* (Yale)	Paul Caligiuri* (UCLA); Benjamin Okaroh (Boston); Steve Trittschuh (SIUE)	Mark Francis (SMU); Gary Furlong (Maryland); John Harkes (Virginia)	John Catliff (Harvard); Guy Furfaro (Philadelphia Textile); George Gelnovatch (Virginia); John Kerr Jr.* (Duke)
1987	Bob Willen (Virginia)	Seamus Purcell (Providence); Paul Rutenis (Clemson); David Smyth (North Carolina)	John Harkes* (Virginia); Mark Mettrick* (Hartwick); Tab Ramos (NC State)	Doug Allison (South Carolina); Bruce Murray* (Clemson); Ken Snow (Indiana); Peter Vermes (Rutgers)
1988	Tony Meola (Virginia)	Jeff Agoos (Virginia); Marcelo Balboa (San Diego State); Kevin Grimes (SMU)	Henry Gutierrez (NC State); Pat O'Kelly (Seton Hall); Mark Santel (Saint Louis)	Scott Benedetti (Portland); Brian Benedict (Duke); Ken Snow* (Indiana); Joey Valenti (Duke)
1989	Tony Meola* (Virginia)	Kevin Grimes* (SMU); Cam Rast (Santa Clara); Kevin Wylie (Vermont)	David Banks (Philadelphia); Tim Martin (Fresno State); Pat O'Kelly* (Seton Hall)	Clark Brisson (South Carolina); Peter Isaacs (Howard); Robert Paterson (Evansville); Ken Snow (Indiana)
1990	Kasey Keller (Portland)	Jeff Agoos* (Virginia); Scott Cannon (Evansville); Tom Loeber (South Carolina)	Dario Brose (NC State); Chad Deering (Indiana); Mark Santel* (Saint Louis)	Steve Rammel (Rutgers); Ken Snow (Indiana); Billy Thompson (UCLA); David Weir (Evansville)
1991	Brad Friedel (UCLA)	Alexi Lalas (Rutgers); Mike Lapper (UCLA); Cam Rast* (Santa Clara)	Peter DiMaggio (Columbia); Graham Merryweather (Evansville); Claudio Reyna (Virginia)	Gerell Elliott (Fresno State); Henry Gutierrez* (NC State); Manny Lagos (Milwaukee); Dante Washington (Radford)
1992	Brad Friedel* (UCLA)	Joe Addo (George Mason); Scott Schweitzer (NC State); Hector Zamora (Seton Hall)	Joe-Max Moore (UCLA); Claudio Reyna* (Virginia); Joey Thieman (Princeton)	Ben Crawley (Virginia); Robert Martella (Bowling Green); Alan Prampin (SMU); Robert Ukrop (Davidson)
1993	Tim Deck (Wisconsin)	Shane Batelle (Saint Louis); Pedro Lopes (Rutgers); Jorge Salcedo (UCLA)	Brian Kamler (Creighton); Jason Kreis (Duke); Claudio Reyna* (Virginia)	Keith DeFini (Creighton); Jimmy Glenn (Clemson); Brian McBride (Saint Louis); Ståle Søbye (San Francisco)
1994	David Kramer (Fresno State)	Brandon Pollard (Virginia); Eddie Pope (North Carolina)	Jason Kreis* (Duke); Brian Maisonneuve (Indiana); Matt McKeon (Saint Louis); Todd Yeagley (Indiana)	Brent Bennett (James Madison); Mac Cozier (Charlotte); Darren Eales (Brown); Ståle Søbye* (San Francisco)
1995	Chris Snitko (UCLA)	Scott Lamphear (Wisconsin); Ian McIntyre (Syracuse); Brandon Pollard* (Virginia)	Ben Hickey (St. John's); Jesse Marsch (Princeton); Clint Mathis (South Carolina)	Mike Fisher (Virginia); Matt McKeon* (Saint Louis); Toni Siikala (Campbell); Andy Williams (Rhode Island)
1996	Jon Busch (Charlotte)	Tahj Jakins (UCLA); Pete Santora (Furman); John Stratton (Air Force)	Mike Fisher* (Virginia); Steve Klein (Bowling Green); Mike Mekelburg (South Florida)	Tony Kuhn (Vanderbilt); Ignace Moleka (FIU); Johnny Torres (Creighton); Andy Williams* (Rhode Island)
1997	Matt Jordan (Clemson)	Leo Cullen (Maryland); Kevin Daly (St. John's); Pete Santora* (Furman)	Daniel Hernández (SMU); Alen Kozić (FIU); Ben Olsen (Virginia)	Wade Barrett (William & Mary); Sigurdur Eyjolfsson (UNC Greensboro); Dema Kovalenko (Indiana); Johnny Torres* (Creighton)
1998	Adin Brown (William & Mary)	Matt Chulis (Virginia); Jamie Clark (Stanford); Kevin Kalish (Saint Louis)	Lazo Alavanja (Indiana); Jay Heaps (Duke); Wojtek Krakowiak (Clemson); Maurizio Rocha (UConn)	Chris Albright (Virginia); Seth George (UCLA); Dema Kovalenko* (Indiana); Richard Mulrooney (Creighton)
1999	Adin Brown (William & Mary)	Nick Garcia (Indiana); Eric Denton (Santa Clara); David Wright (Creighton)	Carl Bussey (SMU); Daniel Alvarez (Furman); Jeff DiMaria (Saint Louis); Sasha Victorine (UCLA)	John Barry Nusum (Furman); Mohammed Fahim (SMU); Ricardo Villar (Penn State); Aleksey Korol (Indiana)
2000	Chris Hamblin (Boston College)	Chris Gbandi (UConn); Cory Gibbs (Brown); Ryan Suarez (San Jose State)	Carl Bussey (SMU); Mark Lisi (Clemson); Jorge Martínez (San Jose State); Ryan Nelsen (Stanford)	Chris Carrieri (North Carolina); Ali Curtis (Duke); John Barry Nusum* (Furman)
2001	Byron Foss (SMU)	Chris Gbandi (UConn); Danny Jackson (North Carolina); Lee Morrison (Stanford)	Luchi Gonzalez (SMU); Kyle Martino (Virginia); Diego Walsh (SMU)	Nicholas McCreath (Rhode Island); Pat Noonan (Indiana); John Barry Nusum* (Furman); Dipsy Selolwane (Saint Louis)
2002	Doug Warren (Clemson)	Todd Dunivant (Stanford); John Swann (Indiana); Chris Wingert (St. John's)	Ricardo Clark (Furman); Sumed Ibrahim (Maryland); Andres Murriagui (Loyola Marymount); Diego Walsh* (SMU)	Alecko Eskandarian (Virginia); Pat Noonan* (Indiana); Tim Pierce (UCLA); Mike Tranchilla (Creighton)
2003	Will Hesmer (Wake Forest)	Leonard Griffin (UCLA); Trevor McEachron (Old Dominion); Chris Wingert* (St. John's)	Scott Buete (Maryland); Sumed Ibrahim* (Maryland); C.J. Klaas (Washington)	Adom Crew (Brown); Ned Grabavoy (Indiana); Vedad Ibišević (Saint Louis); Joseph Ngwenya (Coastal Carolina)
2004	Christopher Sawyer (Notre Dame)	Ugo Ihemelu (SMU); Drew Moor (Indiana); Gonzalo Segares (VCU)	Michael Enfield (UCLA); C.J. Klaas* (Washington); Sacha Kljestan (Seton Hall); Danny O'Rourke (Indiana)	Justin Moose (Wake Forest); Randi Patterson (UNC Greensboro); Ryan Pore (Tulsa); Jeff Rowland (New Mexico)
2005	Chris Dunsheath (Bradley)	Greg Dalby (Notre Dame); Tyson Wahl (Cal); Marvell Wynne (UCLA)	Mehdi Ballouchy (Santa Clara); Scott Jones (UNC Greensboro); Yohann Mauger (Akron); Brian Plotkin (Indiana)	Jason Garey (Maryland); Ross McKenzie (Akron); Jeff Rowland* (New Mexico); Willie Sims (Cal State Northridge)
2006	Nick Noble (West Virginia)	Andrew Boyens (New Mexico); Julius James (UConn); Jay Needham (SMU); John O'Reilly (Lehigh)	Greg Dalby* (Notre Dame); Maurice Edu (Maryland); Ryan Maduro (Providence)	Omar Cummings (Cincinnati); Charlie Davies (Boston College); Edson Elcock (Old Dominion); Joseph Lapira (Notre Dame)
2007	Stefan Frei (Cal)	Eric Brunner (Ohio State); Julius James* (UConn); Pat Phelan (Wake Forest)	Reuben Ayarna (Boston College); Alejandro Bedoya (Boston College); Andrew Jacobson (Cal); Peter Lowry (Santa Clara)	Xavier Balc (Ohio State); Joseph Lapira* (Notre Dame); Patrick Nyarko (Virginia Tech); O'Brian White (UConn)
2008	Jovan Bubonja (UIC)	Calum Angus (Saint Louis); Matt Besler (Notre Dame); Omar Gonzalez (Maryland); Tennant McVea (Loyola)	Corben Bone (Wake Forest); Sam Cronin (Wake Forest); Andrei Gotsmanov (Creighton); Baggio Hušidić (UIC)	Andre Akpan (Harvard); Mike Grella (Duke); Marcus Tracy (Wake Forest); Steve Zakuani (Akron)
2009	Jeff Attinella (South Florida)	Bobby Warshaw (Stanford; Zach Loyd (North Carolina; Ike Opara (Wake Forest)	Kyle Nakazawa (UCLA; Anthony Ampaipitakwong (Akron); Corben Bone* (Wake Forest); Tony Tchani (Virginia)	Teal Bunbury (Akron; Colin Rolfe (Louisville; Ryan Kinne (Monmouth; Andre Akpan* (Harvard)
2010	Zac MacMath (Maryland)	Kofi Sarkodie (Akron); A. J. Soares (Cal); Andrew Wenger (Duke)	Michael Farfan (North Carolina); Matt Kassel (Maryland); Ryan Kinne* (Monmouth); Ben Sippola (Butler)	Will Bruin (Indiana); Tony Cascio (UConn); Darlington Nagbe (Akron); Colin Rolfe* (Louisville)
2011	Brian Holt (Creighton)	Chris Estridge (Indiana); Matt Hedges (North Carolina); Charles Rodriguez (Charlotte)	Miguel Ibarra (UC Irvine); Enzo Martinez (North Carolina); Luis Silva (UC Santa Barbara)	Ashton Bennett (Coastal Carolina); Ethan Finlay (Creighton); Billy Schuler (North Carolina); Andrew Wenger* (Duke)
2012	Andre Blake (UConn)	Chad Barson (Akron); Andrew Farrell (Louisville); Andrew Ribeiro (Creighton)	Scott Caldwell (Akron); Jose Gomez (Creighton); Dillon Powers (Notre Dame)	Ashton Bennett* (Coastal Carolina); Ryan Finley (Notre Dame); Daniel Haber (Cornell); Patrick Mullins (Maryland)
2013	Andre Blake* (UConn)	Steve Birnbaum (Cal); A. J. Cochran (Wisconsin); Taylor Peay (Washington)	Laurie Bell (Milwaukee); Aodhan Quinn (Akron); Leo Stolz (UCLA)	Pete Caringi III (UMBC); Sagi Lev-Ari (Cal St-N'ridge); Patrick Mullins* (Maryland); Harrison Shipp (Notre Dame)
2014	Alex Bono (Syracuse)	Joseph Greenspan (Navy); Brandon Vincent (Stanford); Joshua Yaro (Georgetown)	Jay Chapman (Michigan State); Patrick Hodan (Notre Dame); Leo Stolz* (UCLA); Tanner Thompson (Indiana)	Andy Craven (North Carolina); Fabian Herbers (Creighton); Robert Kristo (Saint Louis); Jordan Morris (Stanford)
2015	Callum Irving (Kentucky)	Jonathan Campbell (North Carolina); Kyle Fisher (Clemson); Brandon Vincent* (Stanford)	Mauro Cichero (SMU); Jack Harrison (Wake Forest); Timo Pitter (Creighton)	Brandon Allen (Georgetown); Nick DePuy (UCSB); Fabian Herbers* (Creighton); Jordan Morris* (Stanford); David Olsen (Seattle U)
2016	Alec Ferrell (Wake Forest)	Alex Crognale (Maryland); Reagan Dunk (Denver); Tomas Hilliard-Arce (Stanford); Miles Robinson (Syracuse)	Ian Harkes (Wake Forest); Jacori Hayes (Wake Forest); Tanner Thompson* (Indiana)	Wuilito Fernandes (UMass Lowell); Julian Gressel (Providence); Albert Ruiz (FGCU); Gordon Wild (Maryland)
2017	Eric Dick (Butler)	Tomas Hilliard-Arce* (Stanford); Tim Kübel (Louisville); Grant Lillard (Indiana); João Moutinho (Akron)	Tucker Bone (Air Force); Mauro Cichero (SMU); Cameron Lindley (North Carolina)	Jon Bakero (Wake Forest); Brandon Bye (Western Michigan); Foster Langsdorf (Stanford); Santiago Patiño (FIU)
2018	Trey Muse (Indiana)	Tanner Beason (Stanford); Alex Comsia (North Carolina); Andrew Gutman (Indiana); Callum Montgomery (Charlotte)	Giuseppe Barone (Michigan State); Tucker Bone* (Air Force); Bruno Lapa (Wake Forest)	Omir Fernandez (Wake Forest); Cal Jennings (UCF); Andre Shinyashiki (Denver); J. J. Williams (Kentucky)
2019	Colin Shutler (Virginia)	Josh Bauer (New Hampshire); Tanner Beason* (Stanford); Eddie Munjoma (SMU); Dylan Nealis (Georgetown)	Joe Bell (Virginia); Blake Bodily (Washington); Bruno Lapa* (Wake Forest)	Matthew Bentley (Missouri State); Cal Jennings* (UCF); Anders Engebretsen (Saint Mary’s Cal); Robbie Robinson (Clemson)
2020	Giannis Nikopolidis (Georgetown)	Bridger Hansen (New Hampshire); Kyle Hiebert (Missouri State); Tom Judge (James Madison)	Vitor Dias (Marshall); Dante Polvara (Georgetown); Dylan Teves (Washington)	Gloire Amanda (Oregon State); Victor Bezerra (Indiana); Zach Ryan (Stanford); Valentin Noël (Pitt)
2021	Jan Hoffelner (Kentucky)	Kyle Hiebert* (Missouri State); Ryan Sailor (Washington); Adam Savill (New Hampshire)	Benjamin Bender (Maryland); Yannick Bright (New Hampshire); Sofiane Djeffal (Oregon State); Sean Zawadzki (Georgetown)	Simon Becher (Saint Louis); Dylan Teves* (Washington); Thorleifur Úlfarsson (Duke)
2022	Casper Mols (Kentucky)	Luis Grassow (Kentucky); Noah Gulden (Lipscomb); Keegan Hughes (Stanford)	Knut Ahlander (SMU); Alex Nagy (Vermont); JC Ngando (UNC Greensboro); Peter Stroud* (Duke)	Eythor Bjorgolfsson (Kentucky); Levonte Johnson (Syracuse); Shak Mohammed (Duke); Ilijah Paul (Washington)
2023	Bryan Dowd (Notre Dame)	Kevin Bonilla (Portland); Morris Duggan (Marshall); Garrison Tubbs (Wake Forest); Mads Westergren (SMU)	Yannick Bright (New Hampshire); Eliot Goldthorp (Hofstra); Jono Nyandjo (UNC Charlotte)	Matthew Bell (Marshall); Charlie Sharp (Western Michigan); Tyrese Spicer (Lipscomb); Ousmane Sylla (Clemson)
2024	Wessel Speel (Duke)	Kyle Cusimano (Bowling Green); Siggi Magnusson (Ohio State); Casper Svendby (Pittsburgh)	Michael Adedokun (Ohio State); Sam Bassett* (Denver); Joran Gerbet (Clemson)	Jesus Barea (Missouri State); Emil Jaaskelainen (Akron); Sergio Ors Navarro (West Virginia); Lineker Rodrigues dos Santos (Marshall)
2025	Niklas Herceg (Vermont)	Lasse Kelp (Maryland); Nikola Markovic (NC State); Agustin Resch (Seton Hall)	Richie Aman (Washington); Diego Hernandez (Furman); Ransford Gyan (Clemson); Zach Zengue (Georgetown)	Marcus Caldeira* (West Virginia); Junior Diouf (Grand Canyon); Donavan Phillip (NC State); Nick Simmonds (Virginia)
