= ISAA Senior Soccer Bowl =

The Senior Soccer Bowl Classic was founded in 1972 by the Intercollegiate Soccer Association of America (ISAA) to be a forum where top college soccer players could compete in an all-star game and where professional soccer scouts could come to see America's best players.

In its 12th year, Senior Soccer Bowl '83 was hosted at the University of Nevada, Las Vegas. The coach for the East All Stars was Dieter Ficken from Columbia University, and the coach for the West All Stars was Bill Coupe from the University of California Berkeley. In that same year, Dieter was also named NCAA Men's Coach of the Year.

In 1983, the Intercollegiate Soccer Association of America (ISSA) began recognizing the best U.S. college soccer goalkeeper and annually awarding the ISAA Goalkeeper of the Year. Between 1984 and 1995, it began recognizing outstanding men's NCAA soccer players and awarding the ISAA Player of the Year.

The Intercollegiate Soccer Association of America (ISAA) was a service organization of institutions that sponsored intercollegiate soccer. It supported, served and promoted institutions, coaches and players from its member institutions through service and award programs. It was founded on the East Coast in 1926 and maintained an organizational membership in the NCAA, the NAIA and the USSF. In 1996, the ISAA entered into a partnership with the National Soccer Coaches Association of America (NSCAA), who now manages former ISAA programs. The ISAA publication, College Soccer Almanac, continues to be published by the NSCAA as a benefit to College Services members.

== Senior Bowl Scores ==
( * ) NCAA Men's Player of the Year (Hermann Trophy)

1972 (Orlando, Florida) East 2 West 0

MVP: Herb Austin

1973 (Orlando, Florida) West 1 East 0

OUTSTANDING OFFENSIVE PLAYER: *Dan Counce

1974 (Winter Park, Florida) West 3 East 2

OUTSTANDING OFFENSIVE PLAYER: *Farrukh Quraishi

OUTSTANDING DEFENSIVE PLAYER: Bruce Hudson

1975 (Orlando, Florida) West 2 East 0

OUTSTANDING OFFENSIVE PLAYER: John Stremlau

OUTSTANDING DEFENSIVE PLAYER: Sam Bick

1976 (Orlando, Florida) East 1 West 0

OUTSTANDING OFFENSIVE PLAYER: Bruce Rudroff

OUTSTANDING DEFENSIVE PLAYER: Kevin Eagan

1977 (Orlando, Florida) East 3 West 2

OUTSTANDING OFFENSIVE PLAYER: Mike Ortiz

OUTSTANDING DEFENSIVE PLAYER: John Nusum

1978 (Orlando, Florida) West 4 East 3

OUTSTANDING OFFENSIVE PLAYER: Papa Jobe

OUTSTANDING DEFENSIVE PLAYER: Ron Schneider

1979 (Tampa, Florida) East 4 West 2

OUTSTANDING OFFENSIVE PLAYER: Shahin Shayan

OUTSTANDING DEFENSIVE PLAYER: Ken Davy

1980 (Ft. Lauderdale, Florida) West 5 East 4

OUTSTANDING OFFENSIVE PLAYER: Ole Mikkelsen

OUTSTANDING DEFENSIVE PLAYER: Saeid Baghvardani

1981 (Tulsa, Oklahoma) East 3 West 2

1982 (Tulsa, Oklahoma) West 1 East 0

OUTSTANDING OFFENSIVE PLAYER: Gerry Rearden

OUTSTANDING DEFENSIVE PLAYER: Ed Gettemeier

1983 (Las Vegas, Nevada) West 4 East 0
