= Milone =

Milone is a surname. Notable people with the surname include:

- Anthony Michael Milone (1932–2018), American Roman Catholic bishop
- Cesare Ferro Milone (1880–1934), Italian painter
- Eugene Milone (born 1939), American astronomer
- Giuseppe Milone (born 1949), Italian sailor
- Nathan Milone (born 1994), Australian rugby league footballer
- Paul Milone (born 1956), American soccer player
- Tommy Milone (born 1987), American baseball player
- Libero Milone,(born 1949-), Auditor General of the Vatican from 2015 to 2017
