= List of NCAA Division I men's soccer career saves leaders =

In association football, or soccer, a goalkeeper's primary role is to prevent the opposing team from scoring (moving the ball over the defended goal-line within the frame of the goal). This is accomplished by the goalkeeper moving into the path of the ball and either catching it or directing it away from the vicinity of the goal line. Within the penalty area goalkeepers are able to use their hands, making them (outside throw-ins) the only players on the field permitted to handle the ball.

The process of preventing a ball from crossing the line is known as a save. In National Collegiate Athletic Association (NCAA) Division I soccer, where a player's career is at most four seasons long, it is considered a notable achievement to reach the 450-save threshold. In even rarer instances, players have reached the 500 and 600-save plateaus. The top 30 highest career saves leaders in NCAA Division I men's soccer history are listed below. The NCAA did not split into its current divisions format until August 1973. From 1959 to 1971, there were no classifications to the NCAA nor its predecessor, the Intercollegiate Soccer Football Association (ISFA). Then, from 1972 to 1973, colleges were classified as either "NCAA University Division (Major College)" or "NCAA College Division (Small College)".

Below is a list of the top career saves leaders in NCAA Division I men's soccer history.

== Career leaders ==
Nat.	Player	Team	Career start	Career end	Games	Saves	SPG	Ref.
	Jose Grave de Peralta	Wake Forest	1980	1983	77	620		
	Dale Hetherington	Western Michigan	1973	1976	50	604		
	Aaron Rhame	Valparaiso	1995	1988	71	577		
	Charlie Ingold	UNC Wilmington	1977	1980	65	561		
	Nick DiGrino	Kent State	1968	1970	29	540		
	Jeff Kraft	Temple	1977	1980	67	534		
	Dragan Radovich	St. Francis Brooklyn	1975	1978	58	532		
	Tom McCormack	St. John's	1979	1982	58	531		
	Peter Pappas	Jefferson	1991	1994	74	522		
	Bob Clouse	Kent State	1971	1973	35	521		
	Nick Christou	Canisius	1992	1995	57	516		
	Gordie Tuttle	New Hampshire	1976	1979	52	507		
	Chris Murphy	Holy Cross	1992	1995		489		
	Brian Herr	Drexel	1994	1997	71	483		
	David Higgins	Charlotte	1978	1982	74	481		
	Peter Hachaj	Fort Wayne	2001	2004	71	481		
	Carlos DeBrito	Marist	1998	2001	70	477		
	John White	Radford	1978	1981		475		
	Chris Doyle	Hartford	1998	2001	80	473		
	John McCarthy	La Salle	2010	2013	74	468		
	Jim Dalla Riva	Creighton	1981	1984	68	466		
	Stash Graham	La Salle	2001	2004	73	463		
	Stewart Beason	Virginia Tech	1982	1985	63	461		
	Howie Friedman	Boston U.	1977	1979	54	460		
	Jim Mueller	New Hampshire	1970	1973	38	457		
	Albert Taras	Wright St.	1979	1982	62	457		
	Paul Centofanti	La Salle	1987	1989	57	457		
	Jim Kane	St. Bonaventure	1987	1990	47	457		
