= Counce =

Counce is a surname. Notable people with the surname include:

- Curtis Counce (1926–1963), American jazz double bassist
- Dan Counce (born 1951), American soccer player and executive
