= Santora =

Santora is a surname. Notable people with the surname include:

- Jack Santora (born 1976), American baseball infielder
- Jamie Santora (born 1971), American politician
- Nicholas Santora (1942–2018), American mobster
- Nick Santora (born 1970), American writer and producer
- Pete Santora (born 1976), American soccer player
- Saverio Santora (1935–1987), American mobster

== See also ==
- Santora Building, historic commercial building in Santa Ana, California
