= Saint Louis Billikens Men's Soccer Half-Century Team =

List of favourite players chosen by fan balloting

The St. Louis University Men's Soccer Half-Century Team was a list of favorite players chosen by fan balloting and announced by St. Louis University Department of Athletics on September 30, 2009 in celebration of the first 50 years of soccer at SLU. It featured two coaches, two goalkeepers, eight defensemen, and twelve offensive players.

== Members ==
Name (Years at SLU)

=== Coaches ===
- Bob Guelker (1959–66)
- Harry Keough (1967–82)

=== Goalkeepers ===
- Kevin Johnston (1987–90)
- Chuck Zorumski (1972–73)

=== Defense ===
- Don Ceresia (1962–64)
- Joe Clarke (1972–75)
- Mark Demling (1970–73)
- Bruce Hudson (1971–74)
- Kevin Kalish (1997–98)
- Bob Matteson (1970–73)
- Bill McKeon (1979–82)
- Denny Werner (1970–73)

=== Offense ===
- Brad Davis (2000–01)
- Dan Counce (1970–73)
- Carl Gentile (1963–65)
- John Hayes (1978–81)
- Jack Jewsbury (1999–2002)
- Ty Keough (1975–78)
- Brian McBride (1990–93)
- Pat McBride (1963–65)
- Matt McKeon (1992–95)
- Mike Seerey (1969–72)
- Mike Sorber (1989–92)
- Al Trost (1968–70)
