= Steve McLean =

Scottish-American soccer player

Personal information
- Date of birth: 31 October 1961 (age 64)
- Place of birth: Glasgow, Scotland
- Position: Forward

Youth career
- 1979–1983: Philadelphia Textile

Senior career*
Years	Team	Apps	(Gls)
1984	Charlotte Gold		
1984–1986	Wichita Wings (indoor)	19	(0)
1986–1987	New York Express (indoor)	16	(1)

International career
- U.S. U-20
- * Club domestic league appearances and goals

Steve McLean is a retired Scottish-American soccer forward who played professionally in the Major Indoor Soccer League and was a member of the U.S. team at the 1981 FIFA World Youth Championship. He is currently a sales manager with Nike, Inc.

== Soccer ==
=== Youth ===
Raised in Kearny, McLean graduated from Kearny High School where he was a 1978 First Team High School All American soccer player. He was later selected to the Wall Soccer Club team of the 1970s. He attended Philadelphia Textile, playing on the men's soccer team from 1979 to 1983. He was a 1980 Honorable Mention as well as a 1982 and 1983 first team All American. He is currently sixth on the team's all-time assists list and eighth on the all time goals list.

=== National team ===
In 1981, McLean was a member of the United States U-20 men's national soccer team at the 1981 FIFA World Youth Championship.

=== Professional ===
In 1984, McLean played for the Charlotte Gold of the United Soccer League. On 27 September 1984, he signed with the Wichita Wings of the Major Indoor Soccer League. Several injuries and illnesses limited him to one game his rookie season as he was moved to defense. In 1986, he moved to the New York Express which collapsed during the season.

== Sports apparel industry ==
In 1989, McLean retired from professional soccer and entered the sports apparel field with Umbro USA. In 1997, he moved to Adidas as the Director of Product Marketing before moving to the Oswego Group in 2000 and back to Umbro in 2003.
