= Cam Rast =

American soccer player and coach

Personal information
- Full name: Cameron Rast
- Date of birth: January 16, 1970 (age 56)
- Place of birth: United States
- Position: Defender

College career
Years	Team	Apps	(Gls)
1988–1991	Santa Clara University		

International career
1989	United States U-20		
1991–1992	United States U-23		

Managerial career
- 1994–2001: Santa Clara University (assistant)
- 1997–1999: U.S. U-17 National Team (assistant)
- U.S. U-23 national team (assistant)
- 2002–: Santa Clara University

Cameron “Cam” Rast (born January 16, 1970) is an American retired youth international soccer defender and current head coach of the Santa Clara University men's soccer team.

== Youth and collegiate career ==
Growing up, Rast had a two brothers including his twin, Matt and two sisters. Rast grew up in California where he played soccer with the Santa Clara Sporting Club. He attended Royal High School in Simi Valley, California. As a high school soccer player, he was a 1987–1988 Gatorade High School Player of the Year. After graduating from high school, he attended Santa Clara University where he played four seasons (1988–1991) as a defender under head coach Steve Sampson. His sophomore year, he was the captain of the Broncos as they made it to the NCAA championship game only to have NCAA officials name Santa Clara and their opponents University of Virginia co-champions after four overtimes. The next year, Rast suffered a knee injury which knocked him out of most of the season. However, in 1991, Santa Clara and Virginia met again in the NCAA title game. This time the game went through four scoreless overtimes before Virginia took the title in penalty kicks. On an individual level, Rast was named a first team All American in both 1989 and 1991.

== Youth international ==
While still in college, Rast was selected as a member of the U.S. U-20 national team at the 1989 U-20 World Cup. In that tournament, the U.S. took fourth place. Not only did Rast go to two NCAA championship games and take fourth in the U-20 World Cup, he also won a gold medal as a member of the U.S. soccer team at the 1991 Pan American Games. He then capped his career as a youth international as the captain of the U.S. soccer team at the 1992 Summer Olympics. This team did not experience the same level of success, going 1–1–1 and failed to qualify for the second round. The following year, he was part of the U.S. team at the 1993 World University Games.

== Coaching ==
Rast was selected in the third round of the 1992 National Professional Soccer League (NPSL) Amateur Draft by the Cleveland Crunch. However, he has made his name since his collegiate and youth international career as a junior national and college coach. He served as the assistant coach to John Ellinger for the U.S. U-17 national team from 1997 through the 1999 FIFA U-17 World Championship. At that competition, the U.S. took fourth place. He also served as an assistant coach of the U.S. U-23 national (Olympic) team at one of the Olympics. In 2002, Rast became the head coach of the Santa Clara men's team, a position he holds today. In 2006, he was selected as the West Coast Conference Coach of the Year.

Besides coaching Rast is also an executive member of U.S. Soccer's Board of Directors as well as the soccer member of the Athlete Advisory Council to the U.S. Olympic Committee.

On May 17, 2006, Santa Clara inducted Rast into its Athletic Hall of Fame.
