= Bruce Murray (soccer) =

American soccer player

Personal information
- Full name: Bruce Edward Murray
- Date of birth: January 25, 1966 (age 60)
- Place of birth: Germantown, Maryland, U.S.
- Height: 6 ft 3 in (1.91 m)
- Positions: Forward; midfielder

College career
Years	Team	Apps	(Gls)
1984–1987	Clemson	84	(48)

Senior career*
Years	Team	Apps	(Gls)
1988–1990	Washington Stars	43	(15)
1988–1989	Luzern	2	(0)
1991	Maryland Bays	9	(2)
1993–1994	Millwall	13	(3)
1994	→ Stockport County (loan)	3	(0)
1995	Ayr United	1	(0)
1995	Atlanta Ruckus	28	(4)

International career
1985–1993	United States	85	(21)
1989	United States futsal	6	(1)

Managerial career
- 2004–2006: Harvard Crimson (assistant)
Medal record
Representing United States
Winner	CONCACAF Gold Cup	1991
Runner-up	CONCACAF Championship	1989
Men's Soccer
- * Club domestic league appearances and goals

Bruce Edward Murray (born January 25, 1966) is an American former professional soccer player who at the time of his retirement was the all-time leading scorer for the United States men's national soccer team. His standout college career led to his selection by Soccer America Magazine to its College Team of the Century. He then played professionally in both Europe at Luzern and Millwall scoring game winning goals vs Stoke, Watford and Nottingham Forest and the United States, including the American Soccer League and American Professional Soccer League. Concussion syndrome forced him to retire in 1995, Murray had earned 86 caps, scoring 21 goals, including one at the 1990 FIFA World Cup. He was also a member of the U.S. national futsal team which placed third at the 1989 FIFA Futsal World Championship. Murray is the Direct of Coaching at Accelerator School DC Metro. He is a member of the National Soccer Hall of Fame.

== Youth and college ==
Murray grew up in Maryland and attended Winston Churchill High School. He played high school soccer at Churchill and club soccer with the Montgomery United Ponies, winning 2 National Championships with the Ponies coached by John Kerr Sr at the U-16 age group in 1981 and the U-19 age group in 1983.

After graduating from high school, Murray attended Clemson University, where he played as a forward on the men's soccer team from 1984 to 1987. In his freshman year, the Tigers took the 1984 NCAA championship in a 2–1 victory over Indiana. Through his four years at Clemson, Murray was a dominant forward, finishing his career as the first Clemson player to gain 40 goals and 40 assists. His senior year, he again won the NCAA championship, this time a 2–0 victory over San Diego State. On a personal level, he was named the 1987 Hermann Trophy winner and the 1987 ISAA Player of the Year. He was also selected as a first team All-American as a forward. This went with his selection as a 1985 All-American midfielder. In 2000, SoccerAmerica named Murray to its College Team of the Century. In 1993, Murray was elected to the Clemson University Hall of Fame.

== Professional ==
In 1988, Murray signed with the Washington Stars of the American Soccer League (ASL). This was the first year in existence for both the Stars and ASL. The Stars finished third in the North Division with an 11–9 record and out of playoff contention. He continued with the Stars for the next three seasons, but also spent time with Swiss club FC Luzern during the 1988–1989 winter (ASL offseason) season. In 1990, the ASL merged with the Western Soccer League to form the American Professional Soccer League. The Stars continued their poor run of play, finishing 7–13 and out of playoff contention yet again. The team folded at the end of the 1990 and Murray moved to the Maryland Bays. In 1991, Murray played nine games, scoring two goals, with the Bays. By this time the APSL was collapsing and the Bays folded at the end of the season.

Murray took a break from full-time soccer when he signed a contract with the U.S. Soccer Federation (USSF) to play full-time with the U.S. national team. On July 30, 1993, the U.S. Soccer Federation released Murray from his national team contract in order to allow him to pursue professional opportunities in Europe. Murray then moved to England to pursue a contract with English Championship club Millwall.

On August 9, 1993, Murray signed with Millwall and scored six days later in his debut match when Millwall defeated Stoke City 2–1. Despite this excellent start, Murray was limited to 12 games with concussion issues scoring three game winning goals against Stoke City, Watford and Nottingham Forest. over the next year and Millwall released him on October 12, 1994. During his time with Millwall, the team sent him on loan to Stockport County.

When Murray returned to the U.S., he signed with the Atlanta Ruckus of the A-League. That season the Ruckus went to the championship before falling to the Seattle Sounders. Having battled knee injuries/head injuries for several years, Murray retired from playing professionally at the end of the 1995 season.

== National team ==
Murray earned his first cap in a 5–0 defeat against England in Los Angeles, on June 16, 1985, while still in college. His first national team goal came against Uruguay on February 7, 1986. The game ended in a 1–1 tie. Murray went on to play on the U.S. team at the 1988 Summer Olympics, and become a mainstay in the lineup during World Cup qualifying. Murray started all three games for the US at the 1990 FIFA World Cup, the U.S.'s first appearance at the Cup since 1950. His play in the World Cup saw him having a hand in both goals scored during the finals, scoring one and assisting on the other.

Murray ended his national team career in 1993 with 86 caps and 22 goals. Murray holds the third most goals scored playing European teams with 9 goals, behind Landon Donovan (10) and Clint Dempsey (12).

Murray also played for the United States national futsal team which placed third at the 1989 FIFA Futsal World Championship. He earned six caps and scored one goal with the futsal team.

=== U.S. National Team Appearances ===
As of match played June 22, 1993.

National Team	Year	Apps	Starts	Goals
United States
United States	1985	1	1	0
United States	1986	1	1	1
United States	1987	3	3	0
United States	1988	8	5	0
United States	1989	12	12	2
United States	1990	20	17	8
United States	1991	16	15	6
United States	1992	12	12	2
United States	1993	12	10	2
Total		85	76	21

=== International goals ===
#	Date	Venue	Opponent	Score	Result	Competition
1	February 7, 1986	Miami, Florida	Uruguay	1–0	1–1	Miami Cup
2	June 4, 1989	East Rutherford, New Jersey	Peru	3–0	3–0	Friendly
3	June 17, 1989	New Britain, Connecticut	Guatemala	1–0	2–1	1990 World Cup qualifying
4	March 10, 1990	Tampa, Florida	Finland	2–1	2–1	Friendly
5	March 28, 1990	Berlin, Germany	East Germany	2–3	2–3	Friendly
6	April 8, 1990	St. Louis, Missouri	Iceland	4–0	4–1	Friendly
7	May 9, 1990	Hershey, Pennsylvania	Poland	1–1	3–1	Friendly
8	June 2, 1990	St. Gallen, Switzerland	Switzerland	1–0	1–2	Friendly
9	June 19, 1990	Florence, Italy	Austria	1–2	1–2	1990 World Cup
10	September 15, 1990	High Point, North Carolina	Trinidad and Tobago	2–0	3–0	Friendly
11	October 10, 1990	Warsaw, Poland	Poland	1–0	3–2	Friendly
12	March 12, 1991	Los Angeles, California	Mexico	2–2	2–2	1991 North American Nations Cup
13	March 16, 1991	Los Angeles, California	Canada	2–0	2–0	1991 North American Nations Cup
14	June 29, 1991	Pasadena, California	Trinidad and Tobago	1–1	2–1	1991 Gold Cup
15	July 1, 1991	Pasadena, California	Guatemala	1–0	3–0	1991 Gold Cup
16	August 28, 1991	Brasov, Romania	Romania	2–0	2–0	Friendly
17	October 19, 1991	Washington, D.C.	North Korea	1–1	1–2	Friendly
18	October 19, 1992	Riyadh, Saudi Arabia	Ivory Coast	4–1	5–2	1992 King Fahd Cup
19	October 19, 1992	Riyadh, Saudi Arabia	Ivory Coast	5–2	5–2	1992 King Fahd Cup
20	January 30, 1993	Tempe, Arizona	Denmark	1–1	2–2	Friendly
21	March 3, 1993	Costa Mesa, California	Canada	2–2	2–2	Friendly

== Post-playing career ==
After a series of head injuries, Murray decided to retire from playing professionally. At first, he entered the metals trading industry, but in 2001, he decided to re-enter soccer with the Atlanta Silverbacks youth program.

In 2002, Murray became the Director of coaching with the Roswell Soccer Club in Georgia.

On September 17, 2004, Harvard University announced that Murray had been hired as an assistant coach with the men's soccer team. He was with Harvard for two seasons, then moved to the Capital Area Soccer League in Raleigh, NC where he was a staff coach.

On March 20, 2011, Murray was elected to the National Soccer Hall of Fame.

Currently, Murray was the radio broadcast color commentator for D.C. United matches on iHeartRadio Sports DC.
