= C. J. Klaas =

American soccer player

C.J. Klaas
Personal information
- Full name: Craig Jared Klaas
- Date of birth: August 23, 1983 (age 43)
- Place of birth: Rockford, Illinois, United States
- Height: 5 ft 7 in (1.70 m)
- Positions: Defender; midfielder

Youth career
- 2001–2004: University of Washington

Senior career*
Years	Team	Apps	(Gls)
2001	Chicago Fire Premier		
2005–2006	Seattle Sounders	49	(3)

International career
2001–2003	U.S. U-20		
- * Club domestic league appearances and goals

C.J. Klaas (born August 23, 1983, in Rockford, Illinois) is an American soccer player who played for U.S. at the 2003 FIFA World Youth Championship and spent two seasons with the Seattle Sounders in the USL First Division.

== Youth ==
Klaas was born and raised in Illinois, playing for the Chicago Magic which won the 1999 U-17 National Championship. He then attended the University of Washington where he played on the men's soccer team from 2001 to 2004. He was a first team All American in 2003 and 2004. He graduated with a bachelor's degree in economics in 2005.

== National team ==
Klaas was selected to the United States U-20 men's national soccer team which competed at the 2003 FIFA World Youth Championship. The U.S. lost to Argentina in the quarterfinals. He played in four matches, including the loss to Argentina.

== Professional ==
Klaas played one season with the Chicago Fire Premier of the fourth division Premier Development League in 2001. The San Jose Earthquakes of Major League Soccer selected Klaas in the third round (thirty-second overall) in the 2005 MLS SuperDraft. The Chicago Storm of Major Indoor Soccer League also selected Klaas with the second pick of the 2005 MISL College Draft. Klaas chose not to sign with either the Earthquakes or Storm in order to finish his degree. After completing it, he joined the Seattle Sounders of the USL First Division. Klaas quickly cemented himself as a critical cog in the Sounders defensive scheme over the next two seasons. However, he left the Sounders after the 2006 season.

== Post-soccer career ==
Klaas joined Klaas Financial in 2007, which was founded by his father, Craig Klaas. He is currently the president and CFO.
