= Lou Karbiener =

American soccer player

Personal information
- Full name: Louis Karbiener
- Place of birth: United States
- Position: Defender

Youth career
- –1982: Penn State

Senior career*
Years	Team	Apps	(Gls)
1986–1990	Orlando Lions		
1992–1998	Orlando Lions		
- * Club domestic league appearances and goals

Lou Karbiener is an American retired soccer defender who played professionally in the American Soccer League and USISL.

Karbiener played collegiate soccer at Penn State University from . He was a 1982 First Team All American. In December 1982, the Tulsa Roughnecks selected Karbiener in the second round of the North American Soccer League draft. The Denver Avalanche of the Major Indoor Soccer League also drafted him. However, he elected to retain his amateur eligibility in order to play for the U.S. Olympic team at the 1984 Summer Olympics. Although he played for the Olympic team in 1983 and 1984, he was dropped by the U.S. team when the International Olympic Committee announced that professionals could play in the tournament. In 1986, he played for the amateur Orlando Lions. In 1988, the team turned professional and entered the American Soccer League. He remained with the Lions through the 1990 season, during which the Lions played in the American Professional Soccer League. In 1992, a new team using the name Orlando Lions entered the USISL. Karbiener signed with this version of the Lions as well.
