= Shaun Pendleton =

English-American soccer player and coach

Personal information
- Date of birth: September 28, 1961
- Place of birth: Sheffield, England
- Date of death: September 7, 2011 (aged 49)
- Place of death: Boone, North Carolina, United States
- Position: Defender

College career
Years	Team	Apps	(Gls)
1982–1985	Akron Zips		

Senior career*
Years	Team	Apps	(Gls)
1985–1986	Columbus Capitals (indoor)		
1986–1989	Memphis Storm (indoor)		

Managerial career
- 1989–1990: Charleston Golden Eagles
- 1991–2007: Lynn Fighting Knights
- 2008–2011: Appalachian State Mountaineers
- * Club domestic league appearances and goals

Shaun Pendleton, born in Sheffield, England, was an English-American soccer defender who played four seasons in the American Indoor Soccer Association before becoming a college soccer coach. His teams won the 1991 NAIA and 2003 NCAA Division II soccer championships.

== Player ==
Pendleton grew up in Sheffield, England. In 1982, he entered the University of Akron, playing for the men's soccer team until 1985. He was a 1984 and 1985 first team All American. He graduated in 1986 with a bachelor's degree in physical education. The Zips inducted him into the school's Hall of Fame in 2004. In 1985, Pendleton signed with the Columbus Capitals of the American Indoor Soccer Association (AISA). The Capitals folded at the end of the 1985–1986 season. He then moved to the Memphis Storm for three seasons before retiring from playing professionally.

== Coach ==
In 1989, NCAA Division II University of Charleston hired Pendleton as its head coach. In his two seasons as head coach he, took the Golden Eagles to a 27–11–1 record. In 1991, he moved to Lynn University which played in the NAIA. Over seventeen seasons, he compiled a 293–42–12 record. He took the Fighting Knights to the 1991 NAIA national men's soccer championship, then runner up in 1992 and 1993. In 1995, Lynn University moved to the NCAA Division II, winning the 2003 championship. In 2008, Appalachian State University hired Pendleton as head coach.

Pendleton was found dead at his home on September 7, 2011.
