= Soccer America Player of the Year Award =

American college soccer award

- Country: United States
- Presented by: Soccer America

History
- First award: 1984, 41 years ago
- Final award: 2019, 6 years ago
- Most recent: Joe Bell, MF; Virginia
- Website: www.socceramerica.com

The Soccer America Player of the Year Award was an award issued by Soccer America magazine naming the best men's and women's college soccer players of the year. The award was given from 1984 until 2019.

== Men's ==
- 2019 — Joe Bell, Virginia
- 2018 — No winner announced
- 2017 — Grant Lillard, Indiana
- 2016 — Ian Harkes, Wake Forest
- 2015 — Jordan Morris, Stanford
- 2014 — Abu Danladi, UCLA
- 2013 — Patrick Mullins, Maryland
- 2012 — Patrick Mullins, Maryland
- 2011 — Ben Speas, North Carolina
- 2010 — Kofi Sarkodie, Akron
- 2009 — Teal Bunbury, Akron
- 2008 — Steve Zakuani, Akron
- 2007 — O'Brian White, Connecticut
- 2006 — Joseph Lapira, Notre Dame
- 2005 — Jason Garey, Maryland
- 2004 — Ryan Pore, Tulsa
- 2003 — Joseph Ngwenya, Coastal Carolina
- 2002 — Alecko Eskandarian, Virginia
- 2001 — Luchi Gonzalez, SMU
- 2000 — Chris Gbandi, Connecticut
- 1999 — Aleksey Korol, Indiana
- 1998 — Wojtek Krakowiak, Clemson
- 1997 — Ben Olsen, Virginia
- 1996 — Johnny Torres, Creighton
- 1995 — Mike Fisher, Virginia
- 1994 — A.J. Wood, Virginia
- 1993 — Claudio Reyna, Virginia
- 1992 — Claudio Reyna, Virginia
- 1987-91 — No winner announced
- 1986 — Paul Caligiuri, UCLA and John Kerr, Duke
- 1985 — Michael Brady, American
- 1984 — Paul DiBernardo, Indiana

== Women's ==
- 2014 — Dagny Brynjarsdottir, Florida State
- 2013 — Morgan Brian, Virginia
- 2012 — Crystal Dunn, North Carolina
- 2011 — Lindsay Taylor, Stanford
- 2010 — Christen Press, Stanford
- 2009 — Kelley O'Hara, Stanford
- 2008 — Casey Nogueira, North Carolina
- 2007 — Lauren Cheney, UCLA
- 2006 — Heather O'Reilly, North Carolina
- 2005 — Christine Sinclair, Portland
- 2004 — Katie Thorlakson, Notre Dame
- 2003 — Lindsay Tarpley, North Carolina
- 2002 — Christine Sinclair, Portland
- 2001 — Aly Wagner, Santa Clara
- 2000 — Anne Makinen, Notre Dame
- 1999 — Lorrie Fair, North Carolina
- 1998 — Danielle Fotopoulos, Florida
- 1997 — Sara Whalen, Connecticut
- 1996 — Debbie Keller, North Carolina
- 1995 — Shannon MacMillan, Portland
- 1994 — Tisha Venturini, North Carolina
- 1993 — Mia Hamm, North Carolina
- 1992 — Mia Hamm, North Carolina
- 1991 — Julie Foudy, Stanford
- 1990 — Kristine Lilly, North Carolina
- 1989 — Shannon Higgins, North Carolina
- 1988 — Shannon Higgins, North Carolina
- 1987 — Michelle Akers, Central Florida
- 1986 — April Heinrichs, North Carolina
- 1985 — Lisa Gmitter, George Mason

== See also ==
- List of sports awards honoring women
- Hermann Trophy
- ISAA Player of the Year (discontinued)
