= Barry Nix =

English footballer

Personal information
- Place of birth: Rotherham, England
- Position: Defender

College career
Years	Team	Apps	(Gls)
1978–1981	Columbia University		

Barry Nix was an English footballer who played as a defender. He was a three-time First Team All American soccer player at Columbia University

== Soccer ==
Nix, a native of Rotherham, England, was recruited to play soccer at Columbia University in the United States, joining in 1978. Over the course of his four-year career with the Lions, 1978 to 1981, Nix established himself as one of the best collegiate soccer players. He earned first team All American recognition in 1978, 1979 and 1981 and second team in 1980.
