= George Lesyw =

American soccer player and coach

George Lesyw Юрій Лесів
Personal information
- Date of birth: January 1, 1957
- Place of birth: Philadelphia, Pennsylvania, United States
- Date of death: March 5, 2005 (aged 48)
- Place of death: Pennsylvania, United States
- Position: Forward

Youth career
- 1975–1978: Temple Owls

Senior career*
Years	Team	Apps	(Gls)
1979–1981	Philadelphia Fever (indoor)	53	(16)

Managerial career
- 1982–2005: Philadelphia Ukrainians
- * Club domestic league appearances and goals

George Lesyw (Note: Ukrainian: Юрій Лесів, romanized: Yurii Lesiv) (July 5, 1957 – March 5, 2005) was an American soccer forward who played three seasons in the Major Indoor Soccer League. He was born in Philadelphia, Pennsylvania.

== Early life ==
Lesyw was born in 1957 in Philadelphia to a Ukrainian father and a Lebanese mother. He graduated from Cardinal Dougherty High School in Philadelphia. He then attended Temple University, where he played on the men's soccer team from 1975 to 1978. His twenty-six career goals puts him sixth on the Temple Owls career goals list. He was a 1978 First Team All American soccer player. In 1978, Lesyw played for the U.S. team at the World University Games. In 1979, he signed with the Philadelphia Fever of the Major Indoor Soccer League and played three seasons with the Fever.

In 1982, he became the head coach of the Philadelphia Ukrainians.

He died on March 5, 2005.
