= United States Youth Soccer Association =

Governing body for sport

CONCACAF
- Founded: 1974; 52 years ago
- Headquarters: Plano, Texas
- CONCACAF affiliation: US Soccer
- Website: usyouthsoccer.org/

The United States Youth Soccer Association (US Youth Soccer, abbreviated USYS) is the largest youth affiliate and member of the United States Soccer Federation, the governing body for soccer in the United States. US Youth Soccer includes 54 State Associations, one per state except for California, New York, Pennsylvania and Texas, which each have two State Associations. US Youth Soccer is a non-profit organization.

The US Youth Soccer membership is divided into four geographic regions; Eastern, Midwest, Southern and Far West.

== History ==
Old logo

Old logo

The association was founded in 1974 with 100,000 registered players. Its founding chairman was Donald Greer, who served in the role until 1984 and was also vice president of the U.S. Soccer Federation from 1972 to 1984. Greer's co-founders included Karl Grosch and Robert Nessler.

Horizontal version of the current logo.

Shield version

By the early 1990s, USYS counted more than 1 million players, and by 2006 it counted more than 3 million registered players.

== Programs ==
The logo of the Olympic Development Program.

The old logo of the ODP.

USYS created the Olympic Development Program (ODP) in 1977. As of April 2023, USYS continues to operate the ODP.

ODP works with state soccer associations to identify high-level youth soccer talent via age-grouped tryouts, then selects players for regional development programs and national camps.

=== Competitions ===
USYS holds the annual US Youth Soccer National Championships for age groups from under-13 to under-19.

USYS also operates the US Youth Soccer National League.

National select teams compete in tournaments against clubs in other youth leagues, such as the Elite Clubs National League.

== Operation ==
USYS is based in Frisco, Texas, and is led by a chief executive officer. As of May 2026, the CEO of USYS is Tom Condone who replaced Skip Gilbert who previously served in the role since January 10, 2020.

== Controversy ==
=== 2022 abuse lawsuit ===
In August 2022, US Youth Soccer was among the defendants named in a lawsuit brought by a former youth player alleging that organizational negligence contributed to her sexual assault by a youth soccer coach.

== Notable alumni ==
- Deandre Yedlin (Washington Youth Soccer ODP, 2006–2009)
- Chloe Ricketts (Michigan Tigers USYSNL)
- Alana Cook (New Jersey)
- Savannah Demelo (Cal South)
- Crystal Dunn (Eastern New York)
- Julie Ertz (Arizona)
- Emily Fox (Virginia)
- Naomi Girma (Cal North)
- Lindsey Heaps (nee Horan) (Colorado)
- Sofia Huerta (Idaho)
- Aubrey Kingsbury (nee Bledsoe), (Ohio)
- Rose Lavelle (Ohio)
- Kristie Mewis (Massachusetts)
- Alex Morgan (Cal South)
- Casey Murphy (New Jersey)
- Alyssa Naeher (Connecticut)
- Kelley O'Hara (Georgia)
- Megan Rapinoe (Cal North)
- Ashley Sanchez (Cal South)
- Emily Sonnett (Georgia)
- Sophia Wilson (nee Smith) (Colorado)
- Andi Sullivan (New Jersey)
- Alyssa Thompson (New Jersey)

== In popular culture ==
Kwame Appiah, featured on season 4 of the Netflix series Love is Blind, was a coach for USYS ODP in Delaware from 2017 to 2018.
