= Pedro Lopes (soccer) =

American soccer player and coach

Personal information
- Place of birth: United States
- Positions: Defender; midfielder

College career
Years	Team	Apps	(Gls)
1990–1994	Rutgers Scarlet Knights		

Senior career*
Years	Team	Apps	(Gls)
1996–1997	North Jersey Imperials		

Managerial career
- 1995: Rutgers Scarlet Knights (assistant)
- 1996: Centenary Cyclones (assistant)
- 1997–2002: Rutgers Scarlet Knights (assistant)
- 2003–2010: NJIT Highlanders
- * Club domestic league appearances and goals

Pedro Lopes is an American retired soccer player who coached the NJIT Highlanders men's soccer team. He played professionally in the USISL.

== Player ==
Lopes was raised in Newark, New Jersey and graduated from Saint Benedict's Preparatory School where he was a 1989 NSCAA High School All American soccer player. He then attended Rutgers University, playing on the men's soccer team from 1990 to 1994, starting all 86 games during his collegiate career. In 1990, Rutgers finished runner-up to the UCLA Bruins in the NCAA Men's Division I Soccer Championship. He was a 1993 First Team and 1994 Second Team All American. He was the 1994 Atlantic 10 Player of the Year. In 2004, Rutgers inducted Lopes into the school's Athletic Hall of Fame.

In 1996 and 1997, Lopes played professionally with the North Jersey Imperials of the USISL.

== Coach ==
Lopes began coaching as a volunteer assistant at Rutgers in 1995. In August 1996, he became an assistant with the Centenary College men's team before returning to the Scarlet Knights as a full-time assistant coach. In 1996, Lopes joined the Jersey Knights Soccer Club, becoming the club's Director of Coaching in 2000. In 2003, the New Jersey Institute of Technology hired Lopes as head coach of the men's soccer team.
