= Brad Friedel =

American soccer player coach (born 1971)

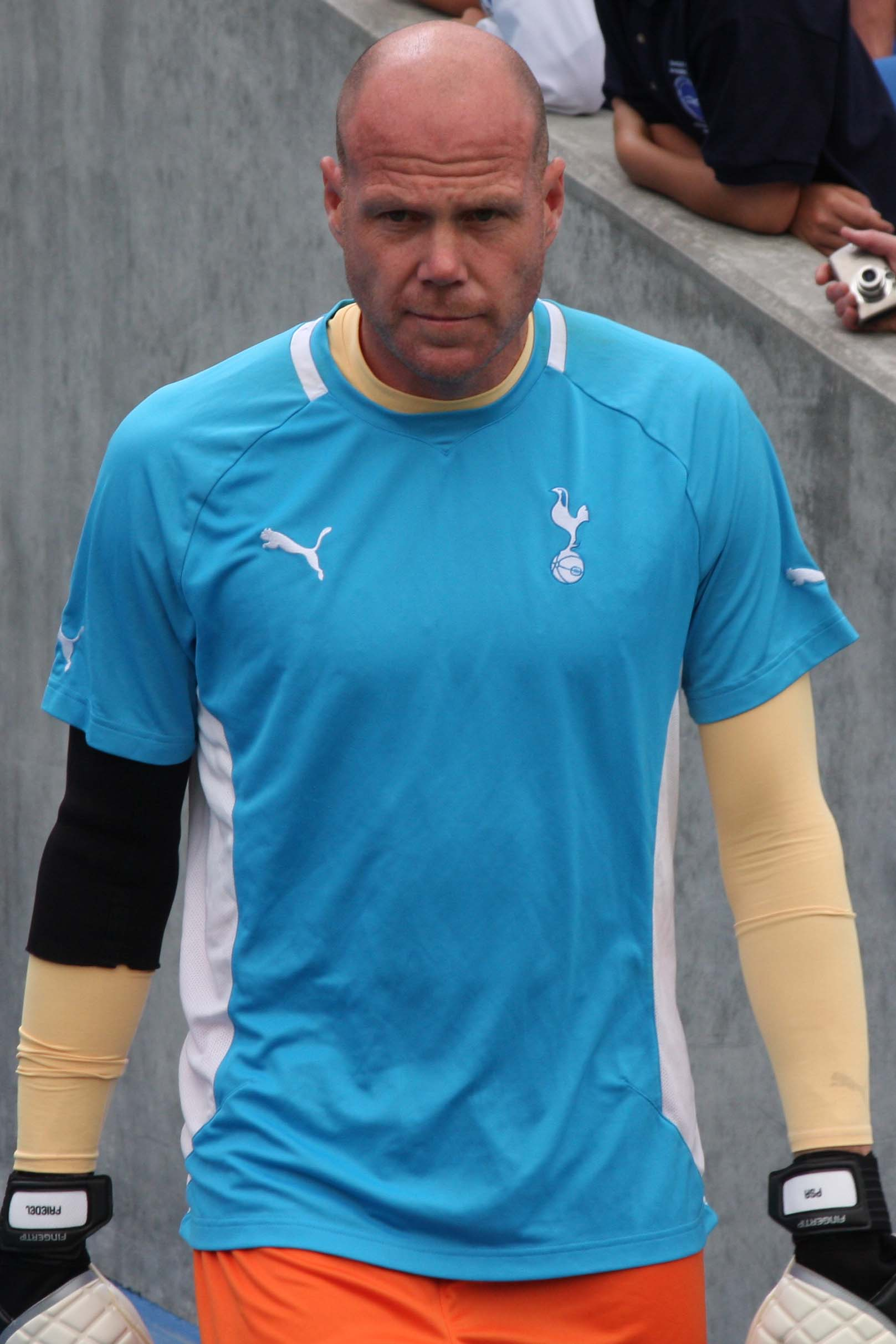
- Friedel with Tottenham Hotspur in 2011

Personal information
- Full name: Bradley Howard Friedel
- Date of birth: May 18, 1971 (age 55)
- Place of birth: Lakewood, Ohio, United States
- Height: 6 ft 4 in (1.93 m)
- Position: Goalkeeper

Team information
- Current team: Shrewsbury Town (sporting director)

College career
Years	Team	Apps	(Gls)
1990–1993	UCLA Bruins	66	(0)

Senior career*
Years	Team	Apps	(Gls)
1995	Brøndby	0	(0)
1995–1996	Galatasaray	30	(0)
1996–1997	Columbus Crew	38	(0)
1997–2000	Liverpool	25	(0)
2000–2008	Blackburn Rovers	288	(1)
2008–2011	Aston Villa	114	(0)
2011–2015	Tottenham Hotspur	50	(0)
Total		547	(1)

International career
2000	United States Olympic (O.P.)	4	(0)
1992–2004	United States	82	(0)

Managerial career
- 2016–2017: United States U19
- 2017–2019: New England Revolution
- * Club domestic league appearances and goals

Bradley Howard Friedel (born May 18, 1971) is an American soccer executive and former coach and player who played as a goalkeeper. He is currently sporting director of EFL League Two club Shrewsbury Town.

Friedel played 84 games for the United States national team between 1992 and 2005, and represented his country at three FIFA World Cup tournaments. He is the current holder of the Premier League record for most consecutive appearances with 310, a feat he achieved during spells at Blackburn Rovers, Aston Villa and Tottenham Hotspur. Until he was left out of the Tottenham team on October 7, 2012, the last Premier League games Friedel missed were Blackburn's final two fixtures of the 2003–04 season against Tottenham and Birmingham City, on May 10 and 15, 2004, respectively.

Friedel is also officially Aston Villa's oldest-ever player, a record he set on February 1, 2011, by playing in the club's Premier League fixture away at Manchester United. Friedel's age of 39 years and 259 days surpassed the previous record held by Ernie Callaghan, who last played for Villa against Grimsby Town in April 1947, aged 39 years and 257 days. Friedel's last appearance for Villa was on May 22, 2011, in a 1–0 home win against Liverpool, aged 40 years and four days.

On May 6, 2012, Friedel also became the oldest player to appear in a competitive match for Tottenham when he played in the club's Premier League fixture at Aston Villa, beating Jimmy Cantrell's near-80-year-old record. He ended his Premier League career after a total of 450 appearances, which remains a record for any North or South American player.

== Youth and college career ==
Born in Lakewood, Ohio, Friedel grew up in Bay Village, where he attended Westerly Elementary School, Bay Middle School and Bay High School. Growing up, Friedel played several sports, including soccer, basketball and tennis, and excelled at all three. He earned Bay High's Outstanding Athlete of the Year award in 1989. As an All-State basketball player in Ohio, he was invited to try out as a walk-on for UCLA's basketball team in 1990. He began as a forward on his youth soccer team before moving into goalkeeping. Friedel graduated from Bay High in 1989. In 2007, he was inducted into the Bay High Hall of Fame.

Friedel played college soccer at the University of California, Los Angeles (UCLA). In 1990, he kept goal for the Bruins to the NCAA championship. He was selected as the first team All-American goalkeeper in 1991 and 1992, and won the Hermann Trophy in 1993 as the top collegiate soccer player. He played 66 games for the UCLA, all of which he started. Soccer America magazine named Friedel to its College Team of the Century.

== Professional career ==
=== Early career ===
Friedel left UCLA early to pursue a professional career. He began by attempting to sign with Nottingham Forest under Brian Clough, but was denied a work permit, the first in several such failed attempts to move to England. Following a brief trial in Scotland with Celtic, Friedel instead registered with the United States Soccer Federation (USSF) and played exclusively with the United States national team as it prepared for the 1994 FIFA World Cup. Following the end of the World Cup, Friedel began searching for a professional club.

Friedel was signed by manager Kevin Keegan of Newcastle United, but again was denied a work permit. While awaiting approval from the British authorities, he practiced with Newcastle as an on-loan player from the USSF.

Friedel joined Danish Superliga club Brøndby IF in the spring of 1995. He stayed with that club for several months in 1995, as back-up to Mogens Krogh. Friedel remained with Brøndby until he returned to the U.S. to rejoin the national team, then preparing for the 1995 U.S. Cup and Copa America.

After the two tournaments, Friedel attempted a third time to join an English club, this time Sunderland. While awaiting a decision regarding his latest application for a work permit, Friedel spent time training with League of Ireland side St. Patrick's Athletic, who were managed at the time by Brian Kerr, a friend of Sunderland manager Peter Reid's. When Friedel again failed to receive a British work permit, his agent negotiated a $1.1 million transfer from the USSF to leading Turkish team Galatasaray in 1995. Galatasaray were managed by Friedel's future Blackburn Rovers manager Graeme Souness. In July 1996, following the end of the Turkish season, Friedel moved to the Columbus Crew of Major League Soccer (MLS). In February 1997, he signed a three-year contract with the Crew as he was named the team's starter. That season, he was selected to the MLS Best XI and named the MLS Goalkeeper of the Year.

=== Liverpool ===
Friedel completed a transfer to Liverpool, worth £1.7 million, in 1997. On December 23, 1997, Liverpool gained a work permit for Friedel on appeal after the first request was denied. He made his debut against Aston Villa on February 28, 1998. While Friedel had some initial success with the Reds, he soon had a difficult time, managing just over 30 games in almost three years, including two appearances in the UEFA Cup, as he sat behind first David James and later Sander Westerveld.

Having not played for over a year due to competition from Westerveld and Pegguy Arphexad, Friedel's work permit at Liverpool expired in 2000.

=== Blackburn Rovers ===
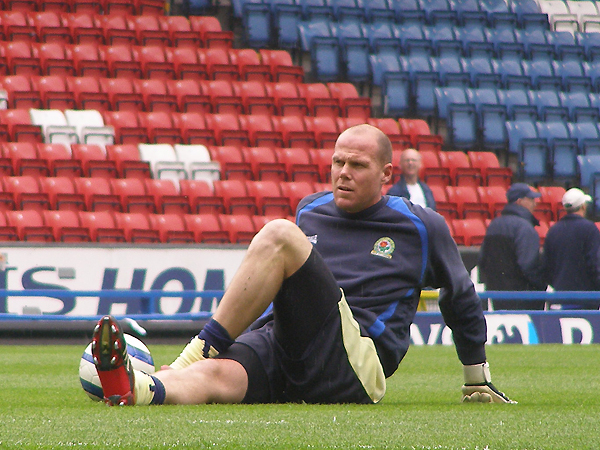
Friedel warming up for Blackburn Rovers

On November 7, 2000 Friedel was signed to Blackburn Rovers by his former Galatasaray manager Graeme Souness, on a free transfer. He made his debut in the Football League First Division on November 18 in a 1–0 home win over Wolverhampton Wanderers, in which he made a close-range save from Tony Dinning. His team ended the 2000–01 season with promotion, ending a two-year spell outside the Premier League.

Freidel was named man of the match as Blackburn beat the odds to win the 2002 Football League Cup final on February 24, 2–1 against Tottenham Hotspur. He and goalscorer Andy Cole were singled out for praise by Souness after the match.

At the end of the 2002–03 season, Friedel's 15 clean sheets earned him Blackburn's Player of the Year award, as well as selection to the Premiership Starting XI. On February 21, 2004, in an away game against Charlton Athletic, Friedel scored a goal from open play in the 90th minute, from a corner kick. Friedel's goal equalized the game at 2–2, but seconds later Charlton scored again through Claus Jensen, and went on to win the match 3–2. He became just the second goalkeeper in Premier League history (excluding own goals) to score, after Peter Schmeichel for Aston Villa in 2001.

Friedel signed new contracts in September 2005, April 2007 and February 2008, stating on the last occasion that, "I am delighted to have extended the agreement. It was not a difficult decision to make. Blackburn Rovers is home to me. This is my club and I have a special affinity with it." He would, however, leave the club at the end of that season to join Aston Villa, just two league appearances short of Terry Gennoe's club record of 289 for a goalkeeper.

In February 2019 he was one of the first seven players to be inducted into the club's Hall of Fame.

=== Aston Villa ===
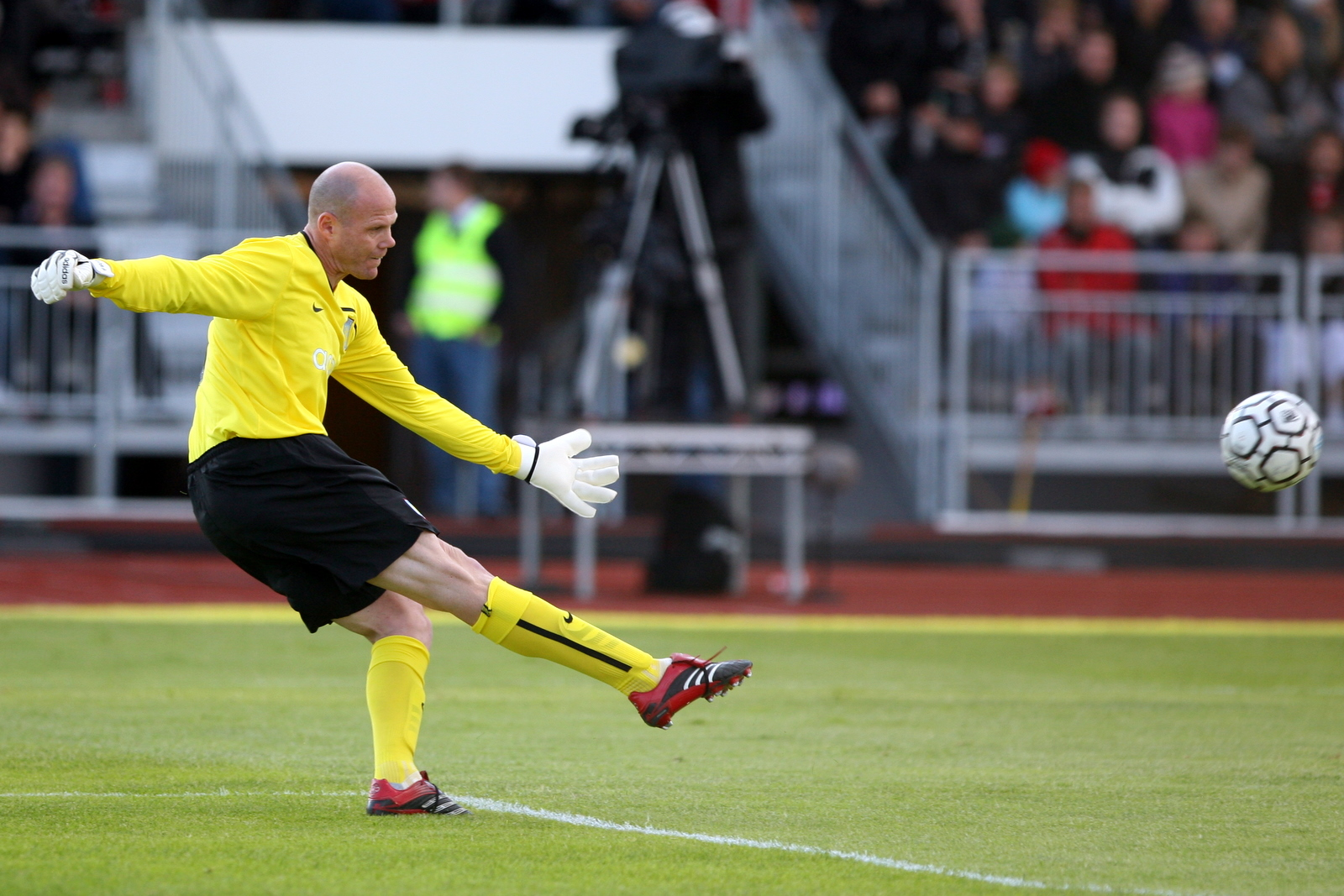
Friedel playing for Aston Villa

Friedel had asked Blackburn for permission to let him speak with Aston Villa if an offer was accepted, with Manchester City reportedly interested in signing the American. The club accepted a transfer bid for Friedel, thought to be in the region of £2.5 million, subject to Blackburn themselves having a bid accepted for a replacement goalkeeper. Villa held talks with Friedel on July 25, and he signed a three-year contract with Villa the day after. He was unveiled at half-time during Villa's Intertoto Cup match against Odense, and made his debut against Reading on August 2 at the Madejski Stadium; just ten minutes in, the hosts were awarded a penalty, which Friedel then saved. His competitive debut came in the UEFA Cup second qualifying round, first leg, against Hafnarfjorður away from home. Villa won the match 4–1. Friedel played his first league match for Villa on August 17, 2008, the first match for Villa in the 2008–09 season, in which Villa beat Manchester City 4–2 at home.

He broke the record for continuous games played in the Premier League on November 30, 2008, after his 167th finished in a 0–0 draw with Fulham. He was sent off against former club Liverpool at Anfield by referee Martin Atkinson. Liverpool were awarded a penalty that Steven Gerrard converted against Villa's second-choice goalkeeper, Brad Guzan, who was interestingly another American keeper named Brad and was also signed in the same season as Friedel. Friedel's red card, which he received on the Sunday beforehand, was overturned by the FA on March 24, meaning that he was able to continue his streak of consecutive Premiership appearances. On January 16, 2011, he reached the landmark of 250 consecutive league games. Friedel became the oldest player ever to play for Villa following their 3–1 loss to Manchester United on February 1.

=== Tottenham Hotspur ===
Friedel's contract with Aston Villa expired after the 2010–11 season. On June 3, 2011, Tottenham Hotspur announced that they had signed Friedel on a two-year deal. On August 22, 2011, Friedel started in goal for Tottenham at Old Trafford against Manchester United, after Tottenham's first home fixture of the season against Everton the previous week was rescheduled due to rioting in North London. This meant that Friedel further extended his run of consecutive games in the Premier League after his transfer from Aston Villa. During the 2011–12 campaign, Friedel also became the oldest player to make an appearance in the Premier League.

The arrival of the French national team's goalkeeper and captain, Hugo Lloris, to the end of the 2012 summer transfer window cast some doubt on Friedel's status as Tottenham's first-choice goalkeeper for the 2012–13 season. However, following an impressive display by Friedel against Norwich on September 1, 2012, manager André Villas-Boas said that Friedel would remain number one. Friedel's run of 310 consecutive Premier League games was ended on October 7, 2012, when he was named on the bench behind Lloris against Aston Villa. Friedel, however, returned in goal for the next match on October 20, 2012, against Chelsea.

On December 26, 2012, it was announced that Friedel had signed a new contract with Spurs, keeping him at the club until 2014.

Following Lloris' failure to fully recover from a head injury, Friedel returned to the starting lineup in a league match on November 10, 2013, but was unable to prevent Tottenham from losing 1–0 to Newcastle United, with the winning goal being scored by Loïc Rémy.

On June 9, 2014, Friedel signed a one-year contract extension with Tottenham, which would keep him at the club until 2015. In addition, Friedel also became a club ambassador, focusing on Tottenham's presence in the United States, a role he continues to fulfill. On May 14, 2015, Friedel announced that he would retire at the end of the 2014–15 season.

== International career ==
Friedel is the fourth-most capped goalkeeper in U.S. national team history, and gained his first international cap against Canada in 1992, a game in which he managed to keep a clean sheet. He was the first-choice goalkeeper for the U.S. 1992 Olympic team; however, he was unable to beat out Tony Meola as first-choice keeper for the U.S. team at the 1994 World Cup. His chance came, and Friedel made his World Cup debut, in the 1998 World Cup, where he conceded one goal as the U.S. lost to Yugoslavia. He lived up to his growing reputation in the 2002 World Cup as the U.S. went on a surprising run to the quarter-finals, which included a 3–2 victory over Portugal in group play, and a 2–0 second-round win over arch-rival Mexico before a loss to Germany (the eventual runner-up). He also became the second keeper (after Jan Tomaszewski) to save two penalty kicks during regular play (as opposed to penalty shootouts) in a World Cup finals tournament. He was dubbed "The Human Wall" by fans during the spectacular 2002 World Cup run.

Friedel announced his retirement from international soccer on February 7, 2005.

== Media career ==
Friedel was a studio pundit for the BBC's 2014 World Cup coverage in Brazil on both television and BBC Radio 5 Live, later appearing on RTÉ's coverage in Ireland after returning home. For the 2014–15 season, he appeared on the BBC's Match of the Day and Ireland's Setanta Sports.

== Management career ==
=== United States U19 ===
On January 5, 2016, Friedel was named the United States under 19s head coach. He won the 2017 CONCACAF U-20 Championship as assistant coach of the U.S. team with Tab Ramos and Omid Namazi.

=== New England Revolution ===
On November 9, 2017, Friedel was named head coach of the New England Revolution, replacing Jay Heaps who was fired by the club in September 2017.

On May 9, 2019, Friedel was fired by the Revolution after a 12-21-13 career record and a 2-8-2 record to open the 2019 season.

== Administrative career ==
Friedel was appointed Advisor to the Board of Directors at Turkish Süper Lig club Beşiktaş on June 7, 2024, a position that lasted until November of the same year.

In November 2026, Friedel was appointed sporting director of English EFL League Two club Shrewsbury Town following its takeover by the US-based consortium Biscayne ST LLC, of which he is also a member. He said he would live locally: "I'll be there day-to-day".

== Personal life ==
Though raised in the midwestern state of Ohio, Friedel developed a slight English accent. In 2008, having lived in England for over a decade, he said "The English don't think I have an accent at all. They think I sound American. And Americans think I sound English. I think I'm caught in the middle."

Friedel is a fan of the NFL's Cleveland Browns, which former Aston Villa Chairman Randy Lerner owned until August 2012.

Friedel also names former American international goalkeeper Tim Harris as his all-time soccer hero. Friedel credits Harris as "the person who started my journey."

In 2007, Friedel launched a non-profit soccer academy in Lorain, Ohio, at a cost of approximately $10 million, providing coaching on a full-tuition scholarship basis to youths aged 12 and older. Premier Soccer Academy had difficulty retaining and obtaining corporate sponsorship after the 2008 financial crisis, however, and closed in 2011. In January of that year, Friedel filed for bankruptcy protection in the United Kingdom as a result of debts arising from the academy.

== Career statistics ==
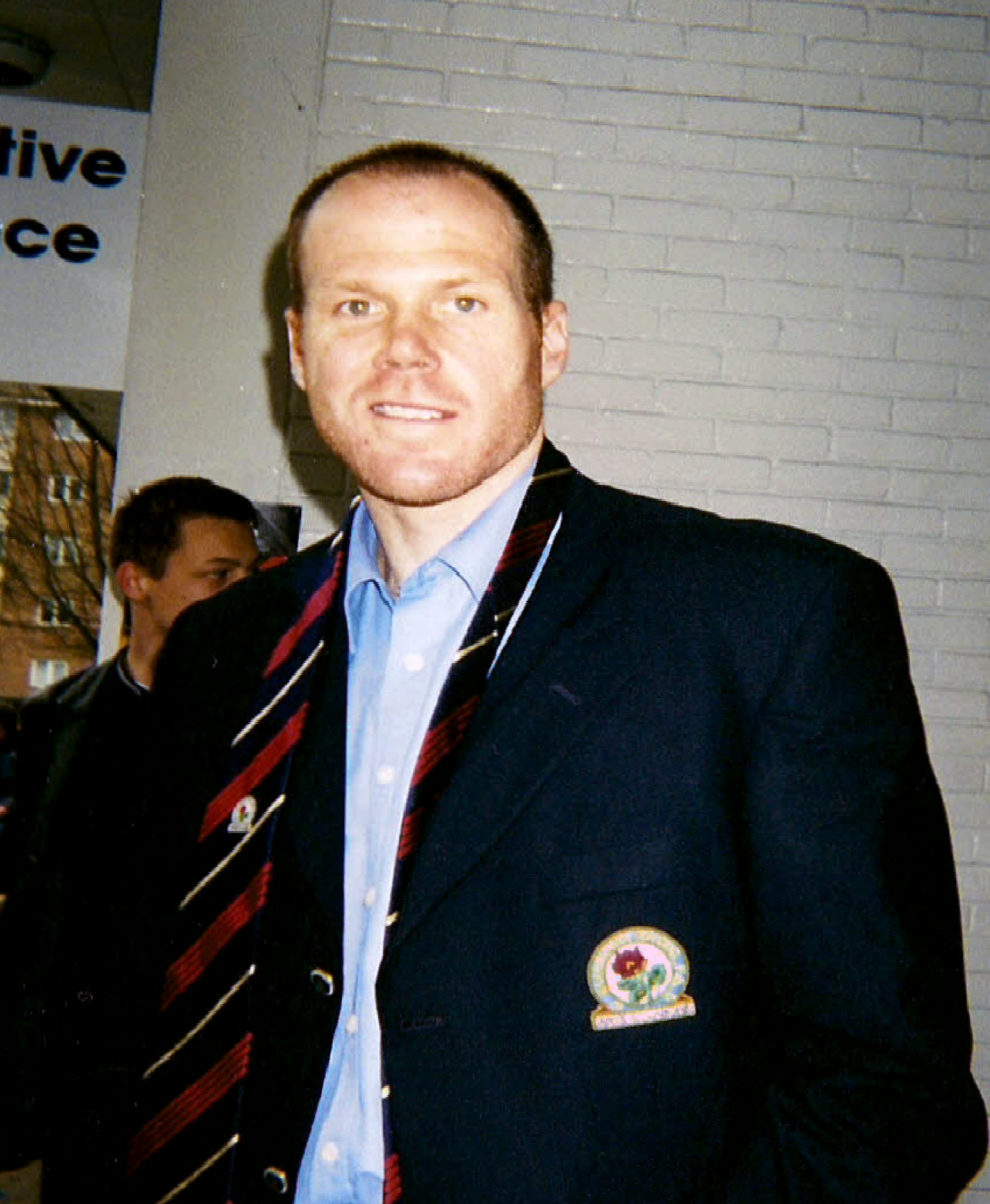
Friedel during his time at Blackburn Rovers, outside Loftus Road, following a match with Queens Park Rangers April 2001

=== Club ===
Appearances and goals by club, season and competition
Club	Season	League			National cup (Note: Includes Danish Cup, Turkish Cup, U.S. Open Cup, FA Cup)		League cup (Note: Includes Football League Cup)		Continental		Other		Total	
Club	Season	Division	Apps	Goals	Apps	Goals	Apps	Goals	Apps	Goals	Apps	Goals	Apps	Goals
Brøndby IF	1994–95	Danish Superliga	0	0			—				—		10	0
Galatasaray	1995–96	Süper Lig	30	0	7	0	—		—		—		37	0
Columbus Crew	1996	Major League Soccer	9	0	0	0	—		—		3 (Note: Appearances in MLS Cup Playoffs)	0	12	0
Columbus Crew	1997	Major League Soccer	29	0	0	0	—		—		4	0	33	0
Columbus Crew	Total		38	0	0	0	—		—		7	0	45	0
Liverpool	1997–98	Premier League	11	0	0	0	0	0	—		—		11	0
Liverpool	1998–99	Premier League	12	0	0	0	2	0	2 (Note: Appearances in UEFA Cup)	0	—		16	0
Liverpool	1999–2000	Premier League	2	0	0	0	2	0	—		—		4	0
Liverpool	Total		25	0	0	0	4	0	2	0	—		31	0
Blackburn Rovers	2000–01	First Division	27	0	6	0	0	0	—		—		33	0
Blackburn Rovers	2001–02	Premier League	36	0	3	0	6	0	—		—		45	0
Blackburn Rovers	2002–03	Premier League	37	0	3	0	3	0	4	0	—		47	0
Blackburn Rovers	2003–04	Premier League	36	1	1	0	1	0	2	0	—		40	1
Blackburn Rovers	2004–05	Premier League	38	0	7	0	0	0	—		—		45	0
Blackburn Rovers	2005–06	Premier League	38	0	2	0	6	0	—		—		46	0
Blackburn Rovers	2006–07	Premier League	38	0	6	0	1	0	8	0	—		53	0
Blackburn Rovers	2007–08	Premier League	38	0	1	0	3	0	6	0	—		48	0
Blackburn Rovers	Total		288	1	29	0	20	0	20	0	—		357	1
Aston Villa	2008–09	Premier League	38	0	3	0	0	0	5	0	—		46	0
Aston Villa	2009–10	Premier League	38	0	3	0	1	0	—		—		42	0
Aston Villa	2010–11	Premier League	38	0	3	0	2	0	—		—		42	0
Aston Villa	Total		114	0	9	0	3	0	5	0	—		131	0
Tottenham Hotspur	2011–12	Premier League	38	0	0	0	0	0	—		—		38	0
Tottenham Hotspur	2012–13	Premier League	11	0	2	0	0	0	7 (Note: Appearances in UEFA Europa League)	0	—		20	0
Tottenham Hotspur	2013–14	Premier League	1	0	0	0	2	0	6	0	—		9	0
Tottenham Hotspur	2014–15	Premier League	0	0	0	0	0	0	0	0	—		0	0
Tottenham Hotspur	Total		50	0	2	0	2	0	13	0	—		67	0
Career total			546	1	47	0	29	0	39	0	7	0	668	1

=== Managerial career ===
As of matches played on May 8, 2019

Team	From	To	Record								
Team	From	To	M	W	D	L	GF	GA	GD	Win %	Ref.
New England Revolution	November 19, 2017	May 9, 2019	47	12	13	22	62	88	−26	25.53	

== Honors ==
Galatasaray

- Turkish Cup: 1995–96

Blackburn Rovers

- Football League Cup: 2001–02
- Football League First Division runner-up: 2000–01

Aston Villa

- Football League Cup runner-up: 2009–10

United States

- FIFA Confederations Cup third place: 1999

Individual

- Hermann Trophy: 1992
- MLS Goalkeeper of the Year Award: 1997
- U.S. Soccer Athlete of the Year: 2002
- Alan Hardaker Trophy: 2002
- Most clean sheets in the Premier League: 2002–03
- PFA Premier League Team of the Year: 2002–03
- Barclays Premier League Merit Award: 2008–09
- IFFHS Best Goalkeepers of the 21st Century: 30th
- Soccer America College Team of the Century
- National Soccer Hall of Fame: 2018
