= John Hayes (soccer) =

American soccer player

Personal information
- Date of birth: September 8, 1960 (age 66)
- Place of birth: St. Louis, Missouri, U.S.
- Position: Forward

Youth career
- 1978–1981: Saint Louis Billikens

Senior career*
Years	Team	Apps	(Gls)
1981–1983	St. Louis Steamers (indoor)	48	(10)
1983–1984	Kansas City Comets (indoor)	41	(12)
- * Club domestic league appearances and goals

John Hayes is an American retired soccer forward who played professionally in the Major Indoor Soccer League.

Hayes attended St. Louis University, where he played soccer from 1978 to 1981. He was a 1980 Honorable Mention and 1981 First Team All American. In 2009, he was selected to the St. Louis University Men's Soccer Half-Century Team.

On October 26, 1981, the St. Louis Steamers selected Hayes with the first pick of the Major Indoor Soccer League draft. He played two seasons in St. Louis before finishing his career with one season with the Kansas City Comets.
