= Ignace Moleka =

Congolese footballer

Iggy Moleka
Personal information
- Full name: Nzoko Ignace Moleka
- Place of birth: Zaire
- Position: Striker

Youth career
- 1991–1996: FIU Golden Panthers

Senior career*
Years	Team	Apps	(Gls)
1993	Topaz Haiti		
1994	Florida Stars		
1997–1998	Albirex Niigata		
1999–2002	Atlanta Silverbacks	91	(47)
- * Club domestic league appearances and goals

Nzoko Ignace "Iggy" Moleka is a retired Congolese footballer who predominantly played as a midfielder in the United States and Japan.

== Playing career ==
In 1991, Moleka received a scholarship to play soccer at Florida International University. He left FIU at the end of the season. In 1993, he played for Topaz Haiti, a selection of top players from the Haitian league, in the Miami Copa Latina. In 1994, he played for the Haitian Internationals. He also played for the Florida Stars in the USISL. In 1994, Moleka returned to FIU to finish his collegiate career. In 1996, he was selected as a First Team All American while the Golden Panthers finished runner-up in the NCAA Men's Division I Soccer Championship.

In 1997, Moleka moved to Japan where he played for Albirex Niigata in the third division Hokushin'etsu. Moleka and his team mates won promotion to the second division Japanese Football League for the 1998 season. In the fall of 1999, Moleka returned to the United States where he played for the amateur Orlando Soccer Locker. Moleka signed with the Atlanta Silverbacks for the 1999 USL A-League season. He retired from playing in 2002, but remained with the Silverbacks where he has held a variety of positions including youth coach.
