= Joey Thieman =

American soccer player

Personal information
- Full name: Joseph P. Thieman
- Date of birth: April 17, 1972 (age 54)
- Place of birth: Arlington, Virginia, United States
- Height: 5 ft 9 in (1.75 m)
- Position: Midfielder

Youth career
- 1990–1994: Princeton

Senior career*
Years	Team	Apps	(Gls)
1995–1996	Charleroi		
1997	D.C. United	3	(0)
- * Club domestic league appearances and goals

Joseph Thieman is a retired American soccer midfielder who played three games for D.C. United in 1997.

== Youth ==
Thieman attended Bishop Denis J. O'Connell High School where he was a three-year varsity soccer player. His senior season, he was the 1989-1990 Gatorade Virginia High School Player of the Year. He was inducted into the school's hall of Fame in 2006. He then attended Princeton University, playing on the men's soccer team from 1990 to 1994. His freshman season, he was the Ivy League Rookie of the Year. He finished his career with 14 goals and 25 assists He was also a 1992 first team and a 1993 second team All American. He graduated in 1994 with a bachelor's degree in history.

== Professional ==
After graduation, Thieman moved to Belgium to pursue a professional career with Charleroi. On February 2, 1997, D.C. United selected Thieman in the third round (thirtieth overall) in the 1997 MLS Supplemental Draft. He played three games for United before being waived on June 27, 1997. In 2001, he played for the San Francisco Scots in the San Francisco Football League Premier Division.

In 2000, he earned his law degree from the Santa Clara University School of Law and passed the California State Bar. He is currently partner at Doty, Barlow, Britt & Thieman LLP. He continues to play in adult soccer leagues.
