= Skip Gilbert =

American soccer player

Personal information
- Full name: Francis B. Gilbert
- Place of birth: Glen Cove, New York, United States
- Position: Goalkeeper

College career
Years	Team	Apps	(Gls)
- Vermont Catamounts

Senior career*
Years	Team	Apps	(Gls)
	Tampa Bay Rowdies	1	(0)
- * Club domestic league appearances and goals

Francis "Skip" Gilbert is an American sports executive and retired U.S. soccer player. He was a two-time NCAA Division I First-Team All-American goalkeeper and played in the North American Soccer League. His business career includes roles in executive management, sales and sales management, marketing and event operations. He held these roles with companies such as United States Youth Soccer Association, the US Anti-Doping Agency, the United States Tennis Association, USA Triathlon, USA Swimming, US Soccer, the Arena Football League and the Sporting News.

== Soccer ==
Gilbert attended the University of Vermont where he played on the men's soccer team. He was twice selected as a first team NCAA Division 1 All American goalkeeper. He graduated with a bachelor's degree in economics and political science and was inducted in the Vermont Athletic Hall of Fame in 1993. He played for the Tampa Bay Rowdies in the North American Soccer League, and played for the US Olympic Development Team in the Korea Cup tournament in South Korea.

== Sports executive ==
After retiring from playing soccer, Gilbert has worked in the publishing and sports marketing career fields. Most recently, Gilbert was the CEO of the United States Youth Soccer Association. His prior sports management career includes senior management positions at the US Anti-Doping Agency (Managing Director - Operations, Marketing & Development), the United States Tennis Association (US Open Tournament Manager & Managing Director, Professional Tennis Operations), USA Triathlon (CEO), the Arena Football League (VP- Corporate Partnerships & Publishing), United States Soccer Federation (VP-Sales) and USA Swimming (CMO). He began his business career in sports publishing spending almost ten years in sales at Sporting News, part of that as the National Sales Manager.

Gilbert has served on numerous Olympic Boards, including being elected as Chairman of the National Governing Bodies Council, the direct liaison between the NGBs and the USOPC. He served on the USOPC Governance Reform Committee and a development committee leading to the formation of SafeSport. Gilbert was a co-founder and long-time Chairman of the Association of Chief Executives of Sport (ACES), serving over 60 Olympic and non-Olympic sport National Governing Bodies (NGBs).
