= Peter Mannos =

American soccer player

Personal information
- Date of birth: July 20, 1954 (age 72)
- Place of birth: Chicago, Illinois, United States
- Position: Goalkeeper

Youth career
- 1972–1975: Northern Illinois University

Senior career*
Years	Team	Apps	(Gls)
1976	San Antonio Thunder	6	(0)
1977–1978	Dallas Tornado	3	(0)
1978	Indianapolis Daredevils	19	(0)
1978–1980	Pittsburgh Spirit (indoor)	32	(0)
1979	Columbus Magic		
1980	Buffalo Stallions (indoor)	1	(0)
- * Club domestic league appearances and goals

Peter Mannos is a retired U.S. soccer goalkeeper who played two seasons in the North American Soccer League, one in the American Soccer League and one in Major Indoor Soccer League. He was also a two-time first team All American goalkeeper.

Mannos attended Northern Illinois University, playing on the NIU Huskies men's soccer team from 1972 to 1975. He was the 1974 and 1975 first team All American goalkeeper. NIU inducted Mannos into the school's Athletic Hall of Fame in 1985. In 1976, he played six games for the San Antonio Thunder in the North American Soccer League. He transferred to the Dallas Tornado in 1977, seeing time in three games. In 1978, he began the season with the Tornado, but was released after playing no games. He then signed with the Indianapolis Daredevils of the American Soccer League. In the fall of 1978, he signed with the Pittsburgh Spirit of Major Indoor Soccer League. After two seasons, he moved to the Buffalo Stallions where he played only one game before retiring. In 2006, he was the director of marketing for Brooks Sports.
