= Randy Phillips (soccer) =

American soccer player

Personal information
- Date of birth: August 14, 1959 (age 67)
- Place of birth: Kansas City, Missouri, United States
- Height: 6 ft 1 in (1.85 m)
- Position: Goalkeeper

College career
Years	Team	Apps	(Gls)
1977–1980	Southern Methodist		

Senior career*
Years	Team	Apps	(Gls)
1981	Minnesota Kicks	10	(0)
1982	Tulsa Roughnecks	0	(0)
1983–1985	Dallas Americans	45	(0)
- * Club domestic league appearances and goals

Randy Phillips (born Dallas, Texas) is a retired U.S. soccer goalkeeper who spent two seasons in the North American Soccer League, one in the American Soccer League and two in the United Soccer League. He was also a two-time first team All American goalkeeper at Southern Methodist University.

Phillips grew up in Dallas, Texas and attended Southern Methodist University where he played on the men's soccer team from 1977 to 1980. He was a three-time All American, being selected to the second team in 1978 and the first team in 1979 and 1980. In 1980, Phillips signed with the Minnesota Kicks of the North American Soccer League. He played in ten games, but the Kicks folded at the end of the season and on December 8, 1981, the Tulsa Roughnecks acquired Phillips in the Dispersal Draft. He was a backup player for Tulsa during the 1982 season. In 1983, he moved to the Dallas Americans in the American Soccer League. The ASL collapsed at the end of the season and the American players moved to the newly established United Soccer League. Phillips was the Americans' starting goalkeeper for the 1984 and 1985 USL seasons. The USL also collapsed after only half the season was played. Phillips does not appear to have played professionally after that.
