= Adubarie Otorubio =

Nigerian footballer

Adubarie "Chris" Otorubio is a former Nigerian football (soccer) defender who played professionally in the American Soccer League.

Otorubio grew up in Nigeria before moving to the United States to attend college. He spent four seasons with the Clemson men's soccer team between 1981 and 1984. He was the 1983 ACC player of the year and was selected as a first team All American. He was also a key part of the Clemson team which took the 1984 NCAA championship. Following graduation Otorubio lived in Oklahoma City. In 1988, he signed with the Orlando Lions of the American Soccer League.

Soccer America Magazine named Otorubio to their College Team of the Century. His daughter Jessica Cousins, ran track for the University of Arkansas.
