= Greg Makowski =

American soccer player (1956–2025)

Personal information
- Full name: Gregory Makowski
- Date of birth: July 5, 1956
- Place of birth: St. Louis, Missouri, U.S.
- Date of death: March 16, 2025 (aged 68)
- Place of death: Lake Mary, Florida, U.S.
- Position: Defender

Youth career
- Scott Gallagher
- 1974–1977: Southern Illinois University Edwardsville

Senior career*
| Years | Team | Apps | (Gls) |
| 1978 | Colorado Caribous | 30 | (2) |
| 1979 | Atlanta Chiefs | 29 | (3) |
| 1979–1980 | St. Louis Steamers (indoor) | 8 | (3) |
| 1980 | Seattle Sounders | 0 | (0) |
| 1980–1982 | St. Louis Steamers (indoor) | 55 | (18) |
| 1982-1985 | Kansas City Comets (indoor) | 136 | (65) |
| 1985–1986 | St. Louis Steamers (indoor) | 45 | (16) |
| 1986 | Los Angeles Lazers (indoor) | 2 | (0) |

International career
| 1978–1980 | United States | 12 | (1) |
- * Club domestic league appearances and goals

Gregory Makowski (July 5, 1956 – March 16, 2025) was an American soccer defender. He was a three-time first team collegiate All American and was a member of the 1980 U.S. Olympic soccer team which was prevented from competing in the Moscow Olympics due to President Carter's boycott of the games. He also earned fourteen caps with the U.S. national team. Between 1978 and 1988, he played with multiple teams in the North American Soccer League and Major Indoor Soccer League.

== Youth and college ==
Makowski grew up in St. Louis, Missouri, where he played youth soccer with Scott Gallagher Soccer Club. He attended Rosary High School. After graduating from high school, Makowski attended Southern Illinois University Edwardsville where he played on the men's soccer team from 1974 to 1977. His sophomore year, the Cougars went to the NCAA championship game only to fall to San Francisco. While he never won a championship at Southern Illinois, he was selected as a first team All American in 1975, 1976 and 1977. He also finished his four seasons with the Cougars in thirty-second place on the school's career scoring record with seventeen goals and ten assists. Makowski failed to attain his degree during his four years playing at Southern Illinois, but he continued to work toward it and was awarded a B.S. in 1979. In 2005, SIU-E inducted Makowski into the school's Hall of Fame.

== NASL ==
The Colorado Caribous, an expansion franchise in the North American Soccer League (NASL), selected Makowski with the first pick in the 1978 NASL College Draft. When the Caribous moved to Atlanta between the 1978 and 1979 seasons, Makowski went with them. In 1979, he played as a member of the Atlanta Chiefs. He played fifty-nine regular-season games in his two NASL seasons.

== MISL ==
In 1980, Makowski joined the expansion St. Louis Steamers of the Major Indoor Soccer League (MISL). He spent at least two seasons with the Steamers. He then was with the Kansas City Comets from 1982 to 1985 when he returned to the Steamers for at least one more season. According to the National Soccer Hall of Fame records, Makowski played in MISL until 1987.

== National and Olympic teams ==
Makowski earned twelve caps with the United States from 1978 to 1980. His first match with the national team came in a September 20, 1978 loss to Portugal. That was the last U.S. game of the year, but in 1979, he saw time in six of the seven U.S. games. On October 7, 1979, he scored his lone national team goal in a 3–1 victory over Bermuda. His last match came on November 9, 1980, in a loss to Mexico.

By the time he earned his first cap with the U.S., Makowski was already a veteran of the U.S. Olympic soccer program. He began playing with the team in 1977 and would continue to see time in games until 1981. In 1980, the U.S. qualified for the 1980 Summer Olympics to be held in Moscow. However, Makowski and his teammates were prevented from competing when President Carter boycotted the games after the Soviet Union invaded Afghanistan.

== Death ==
Makowski died in Lake Mary, Florida, on March 16, 2025, at the age of 68.
