= Sam Nusum =

Bermudian footballer (1946–2026)

Personal information
- Full name: Alfred Granville Nusum
- Date of birth: 3 October 1946
- Place of birth: Bermuda
- Date of death: 28 July 2026 (aged 79)
- Height: 5 ft 10 in (1.78 m)
- Position: Goalkeeper

Senior career*
Years	Team	Apps	(Gls)
- Warwick Workmen's Club
- North Village Community Club
1972–1973	Montreal Olympique	33	(0)
1974	Vancouver Whitecaps	17	(0)
1975	New York Cosmos	17	(0)
- Hotels International
Total		67+	(0+)

International career
- Bermuda
- * Club domestic league appearances and goals

Alfred Granville "Sam" Nusum (3 October 1946 – 28 July 2026) was a Bermudian football player and coach who played at both professional and international levels as a goalkeeper.

== Club career ==
Nusum spent his early career with Warwick Workmen's Club and North Village Community Club.

He appeared in the North American Soccer League for the Montreal Olympique, the Vancouver Whitecaps and the New York Cosmos, making a total of 67 appearances. He was runner-up for the NASL Rookie of the Year Award in 1972.

Nusum finished his career back in Bermuda with Hotels International.

== International career ==
Nusum also played at international level for Bermuda, appearing in World Cup qualifiers, Olympic Games qualifiers, and Pan American Games.

== Coaching career ==
Nusum later became a coach at North Village Community Club.

== Personal life and death ==
Nusum later ran his own business as an electrician.

Nusum died on 28 July 2026, at the age of 79. He was the brother of John Nusum and the uncle of John Barry Nusum.

== Honours ==
Nusum was a member of the Bermuda Sports Hall of Fame.
