= Ken Snow =

American soccer player (1969–2020)

Personal information
- Full name: Kenneth Snow
- Date of birth: June 23, 1969
- Place of birth: Arlington Heights, Illinois, U.S.
- Date of death: June 21, 2020 (aged 50)
- Place of death: Port Huron, Michigan, U.S.
- Height: 5 ft 10 in (1.78 m)
- Position: Forward

College career
Years	Team	Apps	(Gls)
1987–1990	Indiana Hoosiers	87	(84)

Senior career*
Years	Team	Apps	(Gls)
1991	Miami Freedom	11	(5)
1991–1995	Chicago Power (indoor)	140	(151)
1995	Tampa Bay Terror (indoor)	16	(18)
1995–1997	Detroit Neon (indoor)		
1998–1999	St. Louis Steamers (indoor)	28	(56)
1999	Philadelphia KiXX (indoor)	13	(18)

International career
1988	United States	2	(0)
- * Club domestic league appearances and goals

Kenneth Snow (June 23, 1969 – June 21, 2020) was an American soccer forward who was a two-time winner of the Hermann Trophy as the outstanding college soccer player in 1988 and 1990. He had an eight-year professional career playing indoor soccer in the United States.

== High school and college ==
Ken Snow was born in Arlington Heights, Illinois. He grew up in Illinois and attended Hoffman Estates High School from 1983 to 1986 where he played soccer. While at Hoffman, Snow scored in 47 consecutive games, ranking him second, after his brother Steve Snow, on the Illinois High School Association's list of consecutive matches scored in. Ken also ranks #9 on the Illinois state career goals list with 128 goals and #16 on the season (1985) goal scoring list with 49 goals.

After graduating from high school, Snow attended Indiana University, where he played NCAA soccer. He was a four-time, first-team All-American and a two-time winner of the Hermann Trophy in 1988, the same year Indiana won the NCAA Men's Soccer Championship, and again in 1990. He finished his college playing career with 84 goals and 28 assists and a school record 196 points.

== Professional career ==
Like many minor league ball players in any sport, Ken Snow's career is difficult to follow at times as he bounced between a half dozen teams in five leagues over his career.

After leaving Indiana, Snow signed with the Miami Freedom of the American Professional Soccer League where he scored five goals in eleven games. He was then drafted by the Chicago Power of the indoor National Professional Soccer League (NPSL). Snow played four seasons with the Power, his most productive coming during the 1994–1995 season when he led his team in scoring with 56 goals in 40 games. The next leading scorer, Tony Sanneh, had 27 goals. This led to his selection as an NPSL All Star at the February 1995 All Star game.

At the end of the 1994–1995 season, Snow moved to the Detroit Neon of the Continental Indoor Soccer League (CISL). The CISL played indoor soccer during the summer and Snow spent at least two seasons with the Neon, 1995 and 1996. In the fall of 1995, he joined the Tampa Bay Terror of the NPSL playing only sixteen games with them. Snow continued to play with Detroit through at least the 1997 season when he was selected as a CISL All Star. The Detroit club, renamed the Safari for the 1997 season, and the CISL folded at the end of the 1997 season.

Snow moved on to play with the St. Louis Steamers of the Major Indoor Soccer League (MISL) for the first part of the 1998–1999 season. In January 1999, he played in the MISL All Star game, but the Steamers traded Snow to the Philadelphia KiXX for Lee Tschantret and cash on February 18, 1999.

== MLS ==
In 1996, the Kansas City Wizards of the Major League Soccer (MLS) drafted Snow in the 16th round of the league's Inaugural Draft (156) overall. The team waived Snow during the pre-season, on March 25, 1996.

In March 1998, he tried out with the MLS expansion club Chicago Fire, even scoring in a March 6, 1998 exhibition victory over Mexican club Bachilleras. However, he was waived by the Fire on March 19, 1998.

== National team ==
Snow played two games with the United States men's national soccer team in 1988, but scored no goals. His first cap came in a 1–0 win over Guatemala on January 13, 1988. He came on for Joey Kirk. His second cap came six months later in another 1–0 win. This time, it was over Costa Rica on June 14, 1988. He started and played the entire game.

== Death ==
On June 21, 2020, Snow died at 50, in a hotel room in Port Huron, Michigan, from complications possibly brought on by COVID-19 during the COVID-19 pandemic in Michigan.
