= Paul Milone =

American soccer player and coach

Personal information
- Full name: Paul R. Milone
- Date of birth: 26 June 1956 (age 70)
- Place of birth: Newark, New Jersey, U.S.
- Position: Forward

Youth career
- 1976–1977: Princeton Tigers

Senior career*
Years	Team	Apps	(Gls)
1978	San Diego Sockers	0	(0)
1979	Pittsburgh Spirit (indoor)	8	(7)

Managerial career
- 1979–1980: Virginia Cavaliers (assistant)
- * Club domestic league appearances and goals

Paul Milone is an American retired soccer forward who played professionally in the Major Indoor Soccer League.

Milone attended Princeton University, where he was a 1977 First-Team All-American soccer player. In 1978, the San Diego Sockers of the North American Soccer League drafted Milone. He never cracked the first team and in February 1979, he signed with the Pittsburgh Spirit of the Major Indoor Soccer League. He played only one season, scoring seven goals in eight games. He left the Spirit and entered graduate school at the University of Virginia. While at UVA, Milone assisted Bruce Arena with the University of Virginia men's soccer team.

In 1981, Milone and his three brothers, purchased two soccer stores in Northern Virginia. In 1983, they purchased exclusive rights to the distribution of Diadora soccer equipment in the United States. In 1994, the brothers launched the Italian inspired athletic brand Lanzera. The company was a pioneer in sponsoring young American players including John Harkes, Claudio Reyna, and April Heinrichs.

After selling the business in 1998, Milone launched an advisory business focused on consumer and entertainment properties. In addition to being the Principal Partner of ISV International, Milone launched a global firm, Symphony Investment Partners in 2011 focused on mergers and acquisitions from his offices in Washington, D.C., and Montecito, California. The boutique advisory firm has been involved in numerous transactions with major athletic brands such as Hi-Tec, Avia, And1, Sebago, Mitchell & Ness, and others.
