= Dragan Radovich =

Croatian-American soccer player

Personal information
- Date of birth: July 29, 1956 (age 70)
- Place of birth: Šibenik, PR Croatia, FPR Yugoslavia
- Height: 6 ft 0 in (1.83 m)
- Position: Goalkeeper

Youth career
- 1975–1978: St. Francis Terriers

Senior career*
Years	Team	Apps	(Gls)
1979–1980	Washington Diplomats	16	(0)
1981–1982	Portland Timbers	22	(0)
1983	Chicago Sting	10	(0)
- Greek American AA
- * Club domestic league appearances and goals

Dragan Radović, commonly credited as Dragan Radovich (born July 29, 1956) is a retired Croatian-American soccer goalkeeper who spent five seasons in the North American Soccer League. He was also a three time first team All American goalkeeper at St. Francis College.

== Youth ==
While born in Šibenik, Croatia, Radovich grew up in New York City where he developed his soccer skills as part of the Blau-Weiss Gottschee youth system. He attended Jamaica High School where he was a Public Schools Athletic League Iron Horse/Pegasus Award Winner in 1975. Radovich then attended St. Francis College, playing on the school's soccer team from 1975 to 1978. An outstanding collegiate goalkeeper, Radovich was the 1976, 1977 and 1978 first team All American goalkeeper. He was inducted into the St. Francis Athletic Hall of Fame in 1987.

== Professional ==
In 1979, The Washington Diplomats of the North American Soccer League drafted Radovich and he spent two seasons with the Dips before moving to the Portland Timbers in 1981. He played 22 games over two outdoor seasons and 8 games during the 1981-1982 NASL Indoor season. In 1983, he ended his NASL career with the Chicago Sting. His career is obscure after 1983, but he continued to play, at least at a semi-professional level. In 1989, he was on the Greek American AA team which lost the 1989 National Challenge Cup final to the Saint Petersburg Kickers.
