= Bruce Hudson (soccer) =

American soccer player

Personal information
- Date of birth: October 31, 1952 (age 73)
- Place of birth: St. Louis, Missouri, U.S.
- Position: Forward

College career
Years	Team	Apps	(Gls)
1971–1974	Saint Louis Billikens		

Senior career*
Years	Team	Apps	(Gls)
1975	Rhode Island Oceaneers		(1)
1976	St. Louis Stars	22	(0)
- * Club domestic league appearances and goals

Bruce Hudson is an American retired soccer forward who played professionally in the North American Soccer League. He is the president of Hudson Global Sports Management.

Hudson attended St. Louis University where he was a member of the 1972 and 1973 NCAA Men's Division I Soccer Championship teams. He was a 1974 First Team All American. In September 2009, he was named to the St. Louis University Men's Soccer Half-Century Team. He graduated in 1975 with a bachelor's degree in accounting. In 1974 and 1975, he was part of the U.S. Olympic soccer team which was unsuccessful in its attempt to qualify for the 1976 Summer Olympics. He was on the American team at the 1975 Pan American Games.

He was inducted into the St. Louis Soccer Hall of Fame in 2006. In 1975, Hudson began his professional career with the Rhode Island Oceaneers of the American Soccer League. In 1976, he moved up to the St. Louis Stars of the North American Soccer League.

From 1981 to 2008, Hudson worked as the Director of Sport Marketing for Anheuser-Busch. After leaving Anheuser-Busch, he formed Hudson Global Sports Management of which he is the president.
