= Mike Fisher (soccer) =

American radiologist and former college soccer player

Personal information
- Full name: Michael D. Fisher
- Date of birth: May 28, 1975 (age 51)
- Place of birth: Naperville, Illinois
- Position: Midfielder

Youth career
- 1989–1993: Batavia Bulldogs

College career
Years	Team	Apps	(Gls)
1993–1996	Virginia Cavaliers	87	(56)

Senior career*
Years	Team	Apps	(Gls)
1997	Tampa Bay Mutiny	0	(0)
1998	Roanoke Wrath	18	(6)

International career
1996	United States U23	2	(0)
- * Club domestic league appearances and goals

Michael "Mike" J. Fisher (born May 28, 1975, in Naperville, Illinois) is an American radiologist and former college soccer midfielder. Fisher is best known for forgoing a professional soccer career, and went to pursue a medical career.

A four-year letterwinner for the Virginia Cavaliers men's soccer program, Fisher earned numerous accolades, including 56 goals. Fisher also won the Hermann Trophy, an annual award for the top college soccer player in the United States, twice, being one of only four players to ever earn an achievement.

== Early life and education ==
Fisher grew up in Batavia, Illinois where he attended Batavia High School from 1989 to 1993. Fisher excelled both on the soccer field and in the classroom. In 1993, he graduated as class valedictorian and as the Gatorade National High School Player of the Year. At the time he graduated, Fisher ranked 5th on the Illinois State High School career scoring list with 140 career goals. Aside from playing soccer, Fisher also developed an interest in medicine while in high school.

== Collegiate soccer career ==
Heavily recruited by many top colleges, Fisher chose to attend the University of Virginia (UVA) where he played on the school's men's college soccer team under coach Bruce Arena from 1993 to 1996. At the time the UVA Cavaliers had the premier NCAA soccer program. It shared the national championship in 1989 with Santa Clara and beginning in 1991 would run off a string of 4 straight national titles. Over his four years with the program, Fisher became a star on the team. He finished his career as the school's career points leader with 167 on 56 goals and 55 assists. This made him only the third collegiate player to amass both 50 career goals and 50 career assists. His senior year, he led the NCAA in assists, with 20.

Fisher received extensive recognition for his playing. He was selected as both first team All ACC and first team All American his junior and senior years. He was also a second team All America as a sophomore. Fisher was twice named the ACC Player of the Year and won the Hermann Trophy as the outstanding collegiate player in both 1995 and 1996, becoming only the fourth player since 1965 to win the trophy twice.

Despite these many successes, Fisher began losing interest in soccer by his last season in Virginia. The day after day grind of practice wore on the biology major and Fisher began considering alternates to professional soccer. In 1996, he took off the spring semester from school to train with the U-23 national team, then preparing for the 1996 Summer Olympics. That experience proved decisive for Fisher, who was merely selected as an alternate. As Fisher put it, "When I got through my fourth year of college, I figured I lost a little interest in playing. It wasn't as much fun. I took the spring semester off to be with the Olympic team in San Diego. We were living the life of a professional soccer player. You couldn't go out and have a lot of fun. . . . When I returned to Virginia, I figured I would do something else. Luckily, I had medical school to fall back on."

Fisher became interested in orthopedic medicine working with Dr. Frank McCue, a professor and surgeon who worked with the UVA soccer team. After Arena, the Olympic team coach, offered Fisher only an alternate slot on the team, Fisher decided instead to work with Dr. McCue for the rest of the summer. His time with the doctor cemented his decision to leave soccer and pursue medicine full-time.

Fisher is one of 22 college players to be part of the 40-40 club, having both 40 goals and 40 assists in their college career.

== Career ==
After graduating from the University of Virginia School of Medicine, Fisher entered into a diagnostic radiology residency program at Duke University in the summer of 2003. He entered into a musculoskeletal radiology fellowship at Duke in 2007, which he completed in 2008. In July 2008, Fisher joined Delaney Radiology in Wilmington, North Carolina. As of 2020, Fisher is still employed by Delaney.

In the 1997 MLS College Draft, the Tampa Bay Mutiny selected Fisher in the first round, second overall. Fisher declined to join the team and instead entered the University of Virginia School of Medicine. In 1998, he briefly played for the Roanoke Wrath in the USISL D-3 Pro League. In 2000, Fisher was honored by Soccer America Magazine by being named on its College Team of the Century.

Money also played a part in Fisher decision. In an interview for the UVa newspaper, Fisher explained, “Soccer's a little different in that if you come out of college and want to play, maybe you'll make $30,000 a year. If you're lucky and play well for five or six years, you maybe get up to high five figures in salary. If you go to medical school and come out of your residency, you start making six figures after two years of private practice.”
