= Sumed Ibrahim =

Ghanaian soccer player (born 1980)

Personal information
- Full name: Sumed Ibrahim
- Date of birth: December 30, 1980 (age 45)
- Place of birth: Tamale, Ghana
- Height: 5 ft 9 in (1.75 m)
- Position: Midfielder

College career
Years	Team	Apps	(Gls)
1999–2004	Maryland Terrapins		

Senior career*
Years	Team	Apps	(Gls)
2004	Chicago Fire	3	(0)
2005–2006	Harrisburg City Islanders	33	(13)
2005–2006	Baltimore Blast (indoor)	11	(1)
- * Club domestic league appearances and goals as of 25 January 2019

Sumed Ibrahim (born December 30, 1980, in Tamale, Ghana) is a Ghanaian soccer player.

== Career ==
Ibrahim played five years of college soccer at the University of Maryland, playing in a total of 86 games while registering 25 goals and 28 assists. He was twice named an NSCAA first team All-American, and was a leading candidate for the Hermann Award his senior season.

After graduating from Maryland, Ibrahim was drafted 20th overall in the 2004 MLS SuperDraft by the Chicago Fire. He did not make much of an impact with the team his rookie season, playing only 82 minutes and garnering just a single start. The Fire released him after the season, and he signed with Harrisburg.

Ibrahim played two seasons with the City Islanders and also featured for the indoor Baltimore Blast during the 2005–06 winter season.
