= John Nusum =

Bermudan football defender (born 1954)

Personal information
- Date of birth: 6 July 1954 (age 72)
- Place of birth: Paget West, Bermuda
- Position: Defender

College career
Years	Team	Apps	(Gls)
1974–1977	Philadelphia Textile		

Senior career*
Years	Team	Apps	(Gls)
1978	San Diego Sockers	18	(0)
1978–1980	New York Arrows (indoor)	54	(7)
1980	Rochester Lancers	4	(0)
1980–1981	Hartford Hellions (indoor)	28	(3)
1981–1982	New Jersey Rockets (indoor)	10	(0)

International career
- Bermuda
- * Club domestic league appearances and goals

John Nusum is a Bermudan retired professional footballer who played as a defender, spending two seasons in the North American Soccer League and at least one in the Major Indoor Soccer League. He was also a 1974 and 1975 first team All American and played an unknown number of games with the Bermuda national football team, as did his brother Sam Nusum.

== Youth ==
Nusum attended Philadelphia College of Textiles & Science where he played on the men's soccer team from 1974 to 1977. He was a 1974 and 1975 first team All American.

== Professional ==
In 1978, Nusum signed with the San Diego Sockers of the North American Soccer League. He played only one season with the Sockers before moving to the New York Arrows of the Major Indoor Soccer League in the fall of 1978. The Arrows won the 1978-1979 MISL championship. He was back in the NASL in 1980 with the Rochester Lancers, but saw time in only four games.

== National team ==
Nusum played an unknown number of games for the Bermuda national football team. Later, his son John Barry Nusum also appeared for the national team.
