= Claudio Reyna =

American soccer player (born 1973)

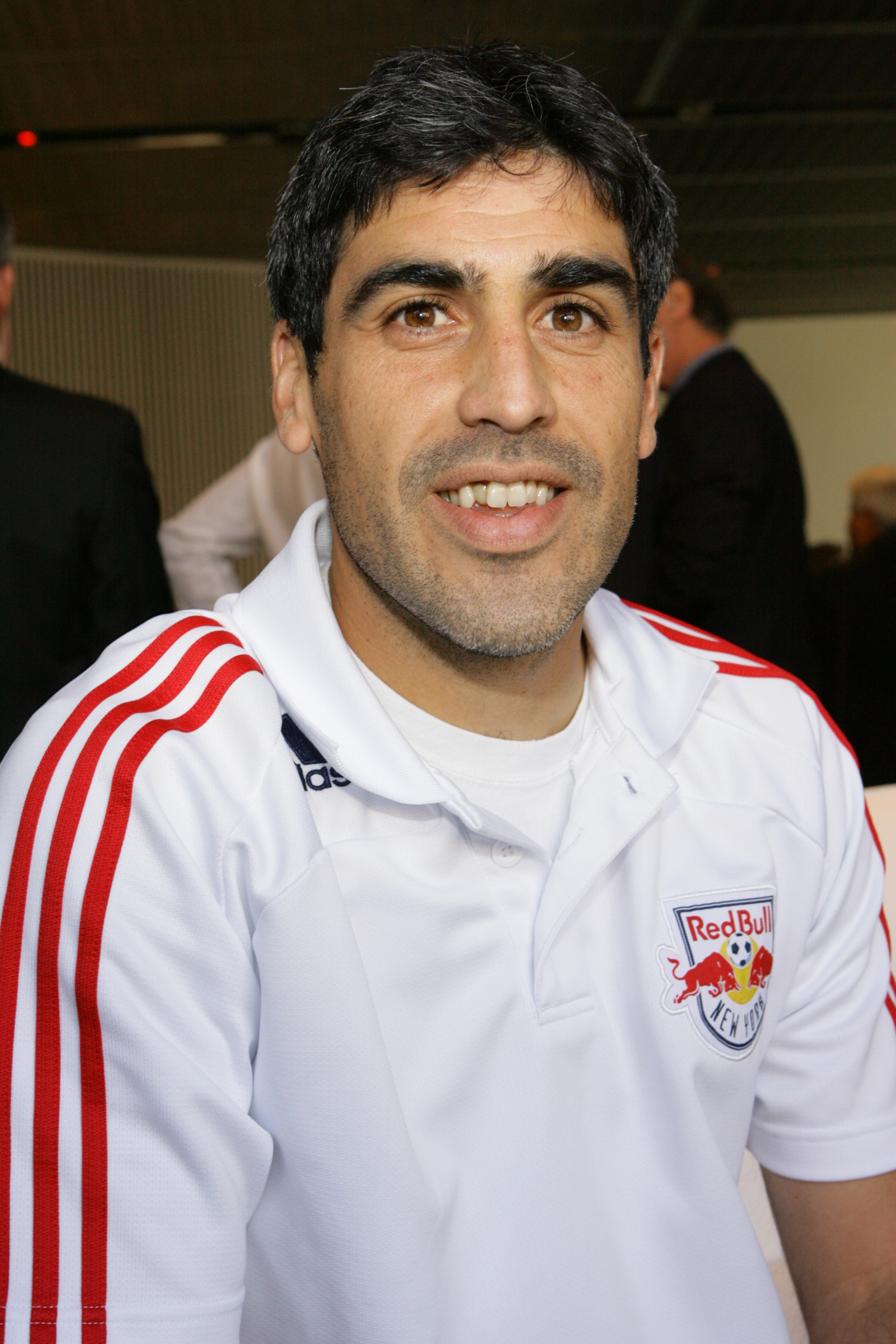
- Reyna with the New York Red Bulls in 2008

Personal information
- Date of birth: July 20, 1973 (age 53)
- Place of birth: Livingston, New Jersey, U.S.
- Height: 5 ft 10 in (1.78 m)
- Position: Midfielder

Youth career
- 1987: Jonathan Dayton Bulldogs
- 1988–1991: St. Benedict's Gray Bees

College career
Years	Team	Apps	(Gls)
1991–1993	Virginia Cavaliers	74	(18)

Senior career*
Years	Team	Apps	(Gls)
1994–1999	Bayer 04 Leverkusen	26	(0)
1997–1999	→ VfL Wolfsburg (loan)	48	(6)
1999–2001	Rangers	64	(10)
2001–2003	Sunderland	28	(3)
2003–2007	Manchester City	87	(4)
2007–2008	New York Red Bulls	29	(0)
Total		282	(23)

International career
1994–2006	United States	112	(8)
Medal record
Men's football
Representing United States
CONCACAF Gold Cup
Runner-up	1998 United States
Third place	1996 United States
Third place	2003 United States-Mexico
Pan American Games
Gold medal – first place	1991 Havana	Team
- * Club domestic league appearances and goals

Claudio Alejandro Reyna (born July 20, 1973) is an American former professional football player and former executive. He most recently served as sporting director of Austin FC.

A former midfielder, he spent most of his professional career in Europe, playing in the Bundesliga for Bayer 04 Leverkusen and VfL Wolfsburg, the Premier League for Sunderland and Manchester City, and in the Scottish Premier League for Rangers. He finished his career in 2008 for New York Red Bulls of Major League Soccer, where he was team captain.

Reyna earned 112 caps for the United States men's national team from 1994 to 2006, being selected for four FIFA World Cups and retiring from the team after the 2006 edition. He was also chosen for two Olympic tournaments, four CONCACAF Gold Cups and the 1995 Copa América. He was named in the Team of the Tournament for the 2002 FIFA World Cup, and elected to the National Soccer Hall of Fame in 2012.

Following retirement, Reyna continued his association with the City Football Group and became technical director of New York City FC in 2013, a position he held until 2019 before joining Austin FC in a similar position, where he remained until 2023.

== Early life ==
Reyna's father Miguel moved to the United States in 1968 from Argentina, where he had gone through the youth system of Independiente and played professionally with Los Andes. He settled in Springfield Township, New Jersey in the 1970s. Reyna was born in Livingston, New Jersey, where he learned the game from his father.

== Club career ==
=== Early career ===
In New Jersey, Reyna became a youth player at Jonathan Dayton High School and then transferred to Saint Benedict's Preparatory School, where he was a teammate of Gregg Berhalter and Robert Ducey, before he graduated from St. Benedict's in 1991. During Reyna's three years with the team, St Benedict's went undefeated (65–0) while Reyna was named as the only two-time Parade Magazine's national high school Player of the Year and the Gatorade National Player of the Year. In 1999, he was named by The Star-Ledger as one of the top ten New Jersey high school soccer players of the 1990s.

Highly recruited out of high school, Reyna elected to attend the University of Virginia from 1991 to 1993 on a full scholarship. While at Virginia, he spent three seasons on the men's soccer team, coached by future U.S. national team coach Bruce Arena. The Cavaliers won the NCAA Championship each of his three seasons. Reyna ultimately made 74 appearances for the Cavaliers, scoring 18 times. On an individual level, Reyna won the Hermann Trophy in 1993 and the MAC Award in 1992 and 1993; and was named the 1992 and 1993 Soccer America Player of the Year. In 2000, the magazine placed him on its Team of the Century and named him the Male Player of the Century.

=== Bayer Leverkusen and VfL Wolfsburg ===
On August 8, 1994, Reyna signed with German Bundesliga club Bayer 04 Leverkusen after playing in the 1994 FIFA World Cup. He had difficulty finding playing time with the Leverkusen first team, making only five appearances. Leverkusen loaned Reyna to fellow Bundesliga side VfL Wolfsburg in July 1997. He quickly established himself in Wolfsburg's first team where he became the first American to captain a European club.

He was halfway through his second year with Wolfsburg when Scottish Premier League club Rangers expressed an interest in Reyna.

=== Rangers ===
On April 1, 1999, Rangers paid $826,400 to Wolfsburg and $2.76 million to Leverkusen for Reyna. Reyna would remain with Rangers until December 2001. Despite building his reputation in Germany and on the national team as a creative midfielder, he spent most of his years at Rangers playing right midfield. He scored thirteen goals for the Ibrox club in all competitions, one of the most notable was a strike that proved decisive over Italian club Parma for qualification for the 1999–2000 UEFA Champions League. He played for Rangers during the September 11 attacks; a Celtic fan at an Old Firm match in October 2001 was caught on camera making aeroplane gestures, for which the fan was much criticised, later apologising.

=== Sunderland ===
On December 7, 2001, Reyna signed a five-year contract at Sunderland in England's Premier League, for a fee of £4 million. He completed the deal minutes before the midday deadline, having played for Rangers in the UEFA Cup at Paris Saint-Germain the night before.

Reyna made his debut on December 15, starting in a 2–0 loss at Southampton in place of the injured Julio Arca, and had a 20-yard first-half shot saved by Paul Jones. A week later, he scored the only goal of the game against Everton, in his first game at the Stadium of Light. On April 1, 2002, he scored twice in a 2–1 home win over Leicester City in which all goals were scored in the first 18 minutes; twelve days later he was sent off at the end of a loss to visitors Liverpool for a foul on goalscorer Michael Owen.

In October 2002, Reyna injured the anterior cruciate ligament in his knee against Bolton Wanderers, ruling him out for six months and ending his season.

=== Manchester City ===
Reyna joined Manchester City on August 29, 2003, for £2.5 million after a move on the same fee to Fulham collapsed.

Reyna's time at City was frequently punctuated by injury, restricting him to thirty appearances in his first season with the club, and causing him to miss six months of the 2004–05 season. In three and a half seasons at the City of Manchester Stadium, Reyna made 87 appearances, scoring four goals.

On January 11, 2007, Manchester City manager Stuart Pearce announced that the club had agreed to terminate Reyna's contract with a view to a move to Major League Soccer for family reasons. This was finalized on January 23, 2007.

=== New York Red Bulls ===
On January 24, 2007, Reyna signed with New York Red Bulls, where he rejoined his former University of Virginia and U.S. national team head coach Bruce Arena. However, much like his years in Britain, Reyna was almost constantly bothered by injuries. He only played in twenty-seven games during two years with New York and only six games in 2008 as he rehabilitated a herniated disc. Reyna announced his professional retirement on July 16, 2008.

== International career ==
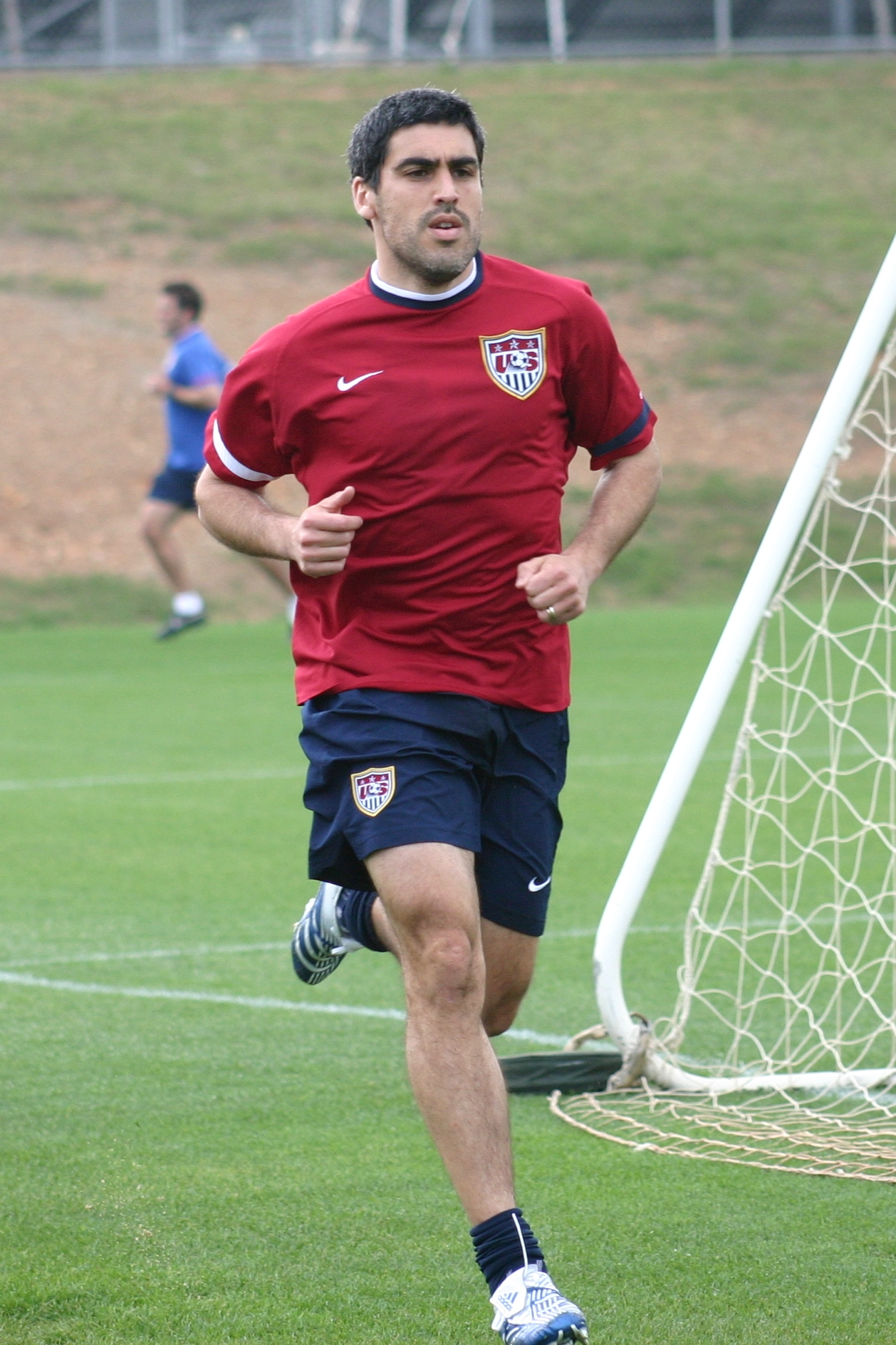
Reyna practicing with the U.S. national soccer team in 2006.

As a U.S. national player, Reyna got his first cap against Norway on January 15, 1994. He was a member of the team at the 1994 FIFA World Cup on home turf, but did not play due to a hamstring injury. Reyna did play in the 1998, 2002 and 2006 FIFA World Cups.

In 2002, despite sitting out the opening 3–2 upset win over Portugal due to injury, he was a key contributor in the next three U.S. games — a tie against South Korea, a loss to Poland, and a win over CONCACAF rival Mexico. In the quarterfinals, the U.S. lost to eventual runner-up Germany. He was named to the World Cup all-tournament team, the first American to do so.

In 2006, Reyna again captained the U.S. at the World Cup in Germany. Trailing 1–0 in the opener against the Czech Republic, Reyna fired a 30-yard shot that bounced off the post, the best American chance in the game. In the final group game against Ghana, Reyna suffered a sprained medial collateral ligament when he lost the ball to Haminu Draman who then dribbled in alone and scored Ghana's first goal.

On June 23, 2006, the day after the U.S. was eliminated from the World Cup, Reyna announced his retirement from the national team. He ended his international career with 111 caps and eight goals.

Reyna also represented the U.S. at the 1992 Summer Olympics in Barcelona and at the 1996 Summer Olympics in Atlanta, Georgia.

In Great Britain, he was occasionally referred to as Captain America because of his status as captain of the U.S. national team.

== Club Executive ==
=== New York City FC ===
On May 22, 2013, Reyna was appointed Sporting Director of MLS expansion team New York City FC. New York City FC made the conference semifinals four of the five years that Reyna was the Sporting Director. Between 2016 and 2019, New York City FC accumulated 231 points, the most of any team in the league during that time. Reyna left the club in November 2019.

=== Austin FC ===
On November 21, 2019, Reyna was named Sporting Director of another MLS expansion team, Austin FC. Reyna led the club in its 2021 inaugural season with his former US national team teammate, Austin FC head coach Josh Wolff. He guided the club through their first two seasons of existence, including an MLS Western Conference Finals appearance in 2022.

On January 26, 2023, Reyna resigned from his role as sporting director amid a personal scandal, remaining as a technical advisor for the club. He had left the club entirely by April 17, 2023.

== Personal life ==
Reyna married Danielle Egan, then a member of the United States women's national soccer team, in July 1997, one week after attending the FIFA All-Star Game in Hong Kong and two weeks after the U.S. team's World Cup qualifier at El Salvador. They had four children: Jack (1999–2012), Giovanni (born 2002), Joah-Mikel (2007), and Carolina (2009). Jack was born in Wolfsburg, Germany; Giovanni was born in Sunderland, England; Joah-Mikel was born in Austin, Texas, U.S.; and Carolina was born in Bedford, New York, U.S.. Jack died of brain cancer in 2012. Giovanni, named after former Rangers teammate Giovanni van Bronckhorst, transferred from the New York City FC development academy to Borussia Dortmund's academy in November 2018. Carolina attends St. Stephen's Episcopal School and represents the USA on the United States women's national under-17 soccer team. The family resided for a time in Bedford, New York.

In February 2012, Reyna and fellow New Jersey native Tony Meola were elected to the National Soccer Hall of Fame, with Reyna named on 96% of the ballots.

Reyna speaks fluent English and Spanish and is conversational in German.

During and after the 2022 World Cup, Claudio and Danielle Reyna were reported to have intervened with the United States Soccer Federation, making "veiled threats" in an attempt to get Giovanni additional playing time and better treatment with the United States national team, and even attempting to blackmail then-coach Gregg Berhalter. One US Soccer staffer characterized Reyna's interactions as "inappropriate," "bullying" and "mean-spirited." A report by the USSF found that facts gathered during the investigation "might raise a question about whether Mr Reyna's communications with US Soccer officials are violative of the FIFA Code of Ethics and its rule against abuse of position". As a result of the scandal, Reyna stepped down from his position at Austin FC, and the USSF re-wrote its guidelines to limit parent/coach interactions. The couple's actions have been criticized as a case of American soccer elitism.

== Career statistics ==
=== International ===
Scores and results list the United States' goal tally first, score column indicates score after each Reyna goal.

List of international goals scored by Claudio Reyna
No.	Date	Venue	Opponent	Score	Result	Competition
1	April 20, 1994	Davidson, North Carolina, United States	Moldova	3–0	3–0	Friendly
2	May 7, 1994	Fullerton, California, United States	Estonia	2–0	4–0	Friendly
3	June 18, 1995	Washington, D.C., United States	Mexico	4–0	4–0	Friendly
4	June 9, 1996	Foxborough, Massachusetts, United States	Ireland	2–0	2–0	Friendly
5	November 9, 1997	Vancouver, Canada	Canada	1–0	3–0	1998 FIFA World Cup qualifying
6	April 22, 1998	Vienna, Austria	Austria	3–0	3–0	Friendly
7	February 6, 1999	Jacksonville, Florida, United States	Germany	3–0	3–0	Friendly
8	June 3, 2000	Washington, D.C., United States	South Africa	3–0	4–0	Friendly

== Honors ==
Rangers

- Scottish Premier League: 1999–2000
- Scottish Cup: 1999–2000

Individual

- Hermann Trophy: 1993
- Fútbol de Primera Player of the Year: 2000
- FIFA World Cup All-Star Team: 2002
- Soccer America College Team of the Century

== See also ==
- List of men's footballers with 100 or more international caps

Sporting positions
Preceded by Thomas Dooley	United States captain 1998–2007	Succeeded by Carlos Bocanegra
Preceded by Amado Guevara	New York Red Bulls captain 2007–2008	Succeeded by Juan Pablo Ángel
