= Dan Counce =

American soccer player

Personal information
- Full name: Daniel Counce
- Date of birth: October 22, 1951 (age 75)
- Place of birth: St. Louis, Missouri, U.S.
- Height: 5 ft 11 in (1.80 m)
- Position: Forward

College career
Years	Team	Apps	(Gls)
1970–1973	Saint Louis University		

Senior career*
Years	Team	Apps	(Gls)
1974	Boston Minutemen	11	(1)
1975	San Jose Earthquakes	6	(0)
1975–1976	San Antonio Thunder	30	(8)
1977	Team Hawaii	22	(2)
1978	California Surf	23	(4)
1978–1979	Philadelphia Fever (indoor)	14	(6)
1979	Toronto Blizzard	8	(0)
1979–1980	St. Louis Steamers (indoor)	30	(21)
1980–1984	Baltimore Blast (indoor)	117	(43)
Total		261	(85)

International career
1974–1976	United States	5	(0)
- * Club domestic league appearances and goals

Dan Counce (born October 22, 1951) is an American retired soccer player and current professional soccer executive. He played six seasons in the North American Soccer League and six more in the Major Indoor Soccer League. He also earned five caps with the United States national team between 1974 and 1976.

== Player ==
=== College ===
After playing at Rosary High School in St. Louis, Counce attended Saint Louis University where he played on the men's soccer team. He was a member of the 1970, 1972 and 1973 NCAA soccer championship teams. In 1973, he won the Hermann Trophy as the outstanding collegiate soccer player in North America. Counce also was selected the MVP of the 1973 ISAA Senior Soccer Bowl and the NCAA National Championship soccer Tournament.

=== National team ===
He earned his first cap with the U.S. national team in a September 8, 1974, loss to Mexico. In 1975, he played only one of the five national team games, a 7–0 loss to Poland in March. It was over a year and a half later before he was called up again, this time for a November 12, 1976, tie with Haiti. His last game with the national team came a month later when he came on for fellow Saint Louis University alumnus Al Trost in a 3–0 loss to Canada.

=== Professional ===
Through the years, Counce established himself as a journeyman player in the NASL. After finishing his career at St. Louis, he joined the Boston Minutemen of the North American Soccer League (NASL). He bounced from team to team, six total, over the next six years, finishing his NASL career with eight games for the Toronto Blizzard in 1979. By this time, however, he had already begun to move towards indoor soccer. In 1978, he signed with the Philadelphia Fever of Major Indoor Soccer League (MISL). The 1978–1979 MISL season was the first for both the team and the league. That year, the Fever went to the MISL championship series, losing to the New York Arrows, despite goals from Counce. Counce continued to play in the MISL, but moved to the St. Louis Steamers for the 1979–1980 season. That year, Counce was named the team's MVP. However, he moved again in the off season to the Baltimore Blast. He was the Blast's team MVP in the 1980–1981 season. Counce remained with the Blast through the end of the 1983–1984 season when he retired from playing professionally.

== Soccer management ==
Counce has been active in managing professional soccer teams even before retiring from playing. He was either a General Manager or Assistant General Manager for the St. Louis Steamers in 1979–1980, the Baltimore Blast from 1986 to 1990 and the St. Louis Storm, also of MISL, from 1990 to 1991.

From 1987 to 1991, Counce served on the United States Soccer Federation Executive Committee and the MISL Board of Directors from 1986 to 1991.

On January 15, 1997, the Rapids hired Counce as the team's General Manager after its first season in Major League Soccer. In 2002, MLS named Counce the league's Executive of the Year. However, just two years later, AEG sold the Rapids to Kroenke Sports and he resigned at the conclusion of his contract in January 2005.
