= Pete Santora =

American soccer player

Pete Santora is a retired professional soccer player.

== College career ==
Santora was a two-time All-American for Furman University and protege of coach Moses Carper.

== Professional career ==
Santora spent the 1998 USISL A-League season playing for the Albuquerque Geckos making 16 appearances.

He spent the 1999 USL A-League season playing for the Jacksonville Cyclones making 14 appearances.
