= History of the United States men's national soccer team =

Overview of USMNT history

United States
- Association: United States Soccer Federation
- Most caps: Cobi Jones (164)
- Top scorer: Clint Dempsey (57); Landon Donovan (57)

FIFA ranking
- Highest: 4 (April 2006)
- Lowest: 36 (July 2012)

First international
- Sweden 2–3 United States (Stockholm, Sweden; August 20, 1916)

World Cup
- Appearances: 12 (first in 1930)
- Best result: Third place (1930)

CONCACAF Championship / Gold Cup
- Appearances: 20 (first in 1985)
- Best result: Champions (1991, 2002, 2005, 2007, 2013, 2017, 2021)

The history of the United States men's national soccer team began with the country's first international match in 1916. Highlights from the team's early history include reaching the semi-finals of the inaugural 1930 World Cup (later recognized by FIFA as third place finish based on overall records), and defeating England in a remarkable upset in the 1950 World Cup.

The United States men's national soccer team improved during the 1980s, and played in every World Cup from 1990 to 2014. The team's best performances in modern history include reaching the quarter-finals of the 2002 World Cup, and defeating top-ranked Spain to reach the final of the 2009 Confederations Cup.

== Early history: 1885–1904 ==
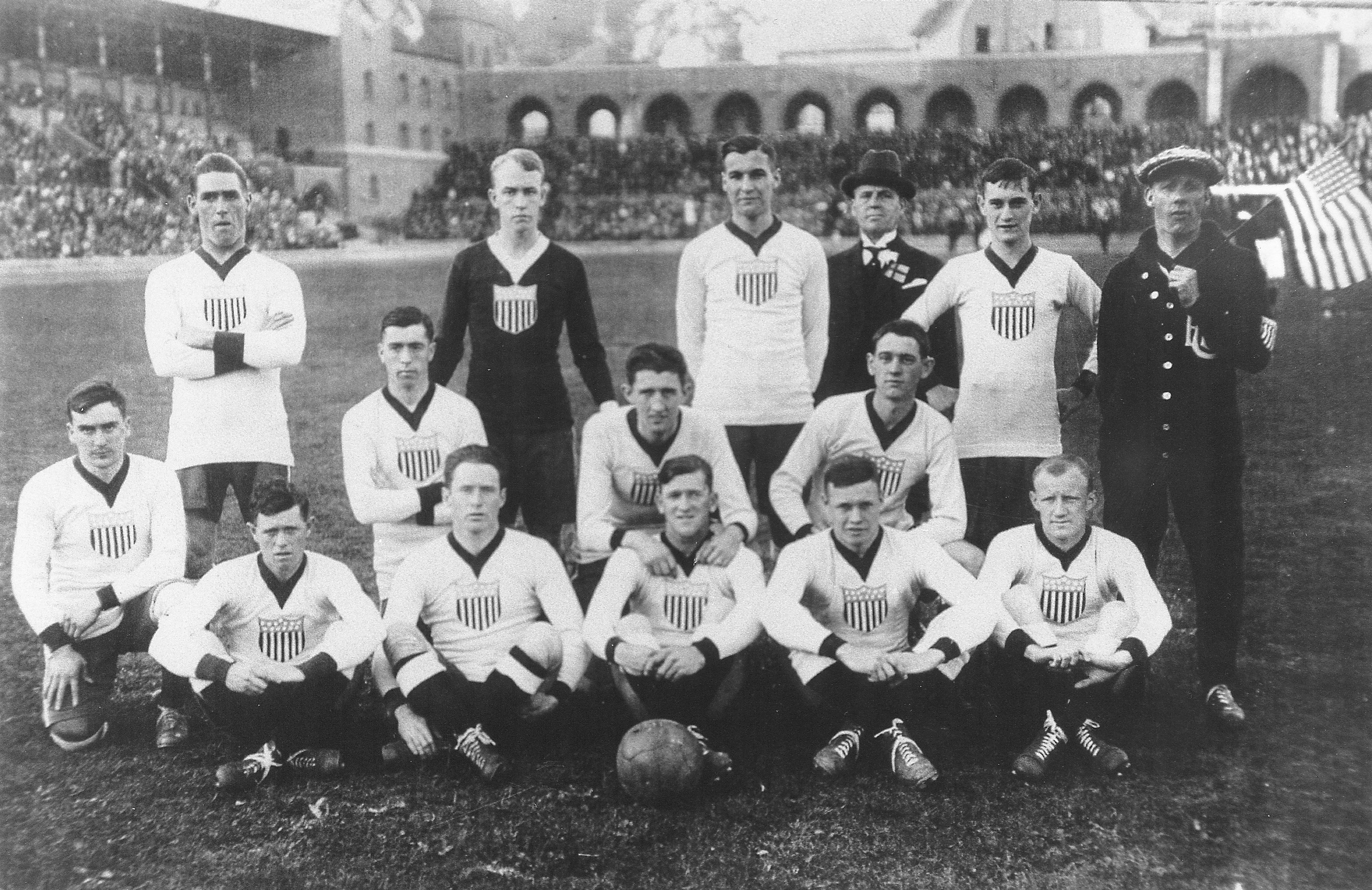
The 1916 U.S. soccer team.

On November 28, 1885, the United States and Canada played at Clark Field in the East Newark neighborhood of Kearny, New Jersey making it the first international match held outside of the United Kingdom; the Canadians won the match 1–0. The following year, a fixture at the same venue resulted in the U.S. winning after scoring the only goal of the game. Neither match was officially recognized.

Thirty years later, on August 20, 1916, the United States played its first official international match under the auspices of U.S. Soccer against Sweden in Stockholm, which the U.S. won 3–2, with goals from Dick Spalding, Charles Ellis and Harry Cooper.

The U.S. won both the silver and bronze medals in men's soccer at the 1904 Summer Olympics held in St. Louis, Missouri. The tournament featured three teams: Galt F.C. from Canada and Christian Brothers College and St. Rose Parish from the United States (early Olympic soccer tournaments featured club teams instead of national teams). Galt defeated both American teams to win the gold. Christian Brothers defeated St. Rose in the replay after a scoreless draw.

== 1930s: Third place at the first World Cup ==
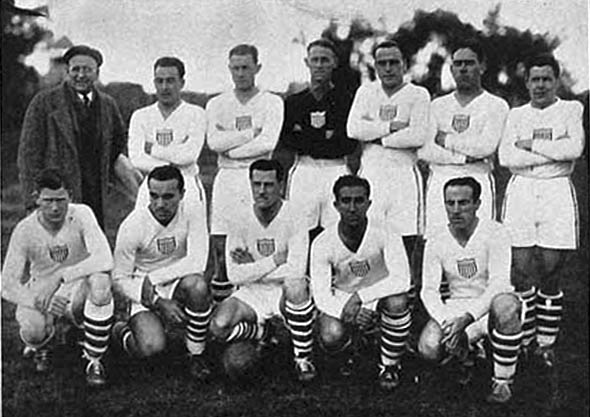
The U.S. squad at the 1930 World Cup

In the 1930 World Cup, the U.S. won their first match in World Cup history, beating Belgium 3–0 at the Estadio Gran Parque Central in Montevideo, Uruguay. The match occurred simultaneously with another across town at the Estadio Pocitos where France defeated Mexico.

In the next match, the United States again won 3–0, this time against Paraguay. For many years, FIFA credited Bert Patenaude with the first and third goals and his teammate Tom Florie with the second. Other sources described the second goal as having been scored by Patenaude or by Paraguayan Aurelio González. In November 2006, FIFA announced that it had accepted evidence from "various historians and football fans" that Patenaude scored all three goals, and was thus the first person to score a hat trick in a World Cup finals tournament.

Having reached the semifinals with two wins, the American side lost 6–1 to Argentina. Using the overall tournament records, FIFA lists the U.S. as finishing in third place, above fellow semifinalist Yugoslavia. This is still the team's highest World Cup finish, and the highest finish of any CONCACAF nation. Furthermore, it is the only time a national team from outside the traditional powerhouse regions of CONMEBOL (South America) and UEFA (Europe) have finished on the podium.

== 1950 World Cup: upset of England ==
In the 1950 World Cup, the United States lost their first match 3–1 against Spain, but then won 1–0 against England in what is widely considered one of the greatest upsets in football history, England having recently beaten the rest of Europe 6–1 in an exhibition match. Sports Illustrated and Soccer Digest have called the game the "Miracle on Grass." A 5–2 defeat by Chile in the third group match saw the U.S. eliminated from the tournament. It would be four decades before the United States would make another appearance at the World Cup.

== 1950s–1970s ==
Despite the United States' relative success in early international tournaments, soccer remained a niche sport in the U.S. for many years. In the three decades after the 1950 World Cup, the only victories for the United States came against Haiti, Bermuda, Honduras, Canada, Poland, and China.

== 1980s ==
After the enthusiasm caused by the creation and rise of the North American Soccer League in the 1960s and 1970s, it seemed as though the U.S. men's national team would soon become a powerful force in world soccer. These hopes were not realized, however. The United States played only two international matches from 1981 to 1983.

To provide a more stable national team program and renew interest in the NASL, U.S. Soccer entered the national team into the league for the 1983 season as Team America. This team lacked the continuity and regularity of training that conventional clubs enjoy, and many players were unwilling to play for the team instead of their own clubs. Embarrassingly, Team America finished the season at the bottom of the league. U.S. Soccer cancelled this experiment, and the national team was withdrawn from the NASL.

U.S. Soccer targeted the 1984 Summer Olympics in Los Angeles, California and the 1986 World Cup as means of rebuilding the national team and their fan base. The International Olympic Committee declared that teams from outside Europe and South America could field full senior teams, including professionals (until then, the amateur-only rule had heavily favored socialist countries from Eastern Europe whose players were professionals in all but name). The U.S. had a very strong showing at the tournament, beating Costa Rica, tying Egypt, losing only to favorite Italy and finishing 1–1–1 but didn't make the second round, losing to Egypt on a tiebreaker (both had three points, but Egypt had scored one more goal than the United States).

The United States bid to host the 1986 World Cup, after Colombia withdrew from hosting due to economic concerns. However, Mexico beat the U.S. and Canada to host the tournament, despite concerns that the tournament would have to be moved again because of a major earthquake that hit Mexico shortly before the tournament.

By the end of 1984, the NASL had folded and there was no senior outdoor soccer league operating in the United States. As a result, many top American players, such as John Kerr, Paul Caligiuri, Eric Eichmann, and Bruce Murray, moved overseas, primarily to Europe.

In the last game of the qualifying tournament for the 1986 World Cup, the U.S. needed only a draw against Costa Rica, whom the U.S. had beaten 3–0 in the Olympics the year before, to reach the final qualification group against Honduras and Canada. U.S. Soccer scheduled the game to be played at El Camino College in Torrance, California, an area with many Costa Rican expatriates, and marketed the game almost exclusively to the Costa Rican community, even providing Costa Rican folk dances as halftime entertainment. A 35th-minute goal by Evaristo Coronado won the match for Costa Rica and kept the United States from reaching its first World Cup since 1950.

In 1988, U.S. Soccer attempted to reimplement its national-team-as-club concept, offering contracts to national team players, to build an international team with something of a club ethos, while loaning them out to their club teams, saving U.S. Soccer the expense of their salaries. This brought many key veterans back to the team, while the success of the NASL a decade earlier had created an influx of talent from burgeoning grass-roots level clubs and youth programs. Thus U.S. Soccer sought to establish a more stable foundation for participation in the 1990 World Cup than had existed for previous tournaments.

== 1990s: Rebirth for American soccer ==
=== 1990 World Cup ===
In 1988, FIFA named the United States hosts of the 1994 World Cup, but it did so under significant international criticism because of the perceived weakness of the national team and the lack of a professional outdoor league. The success of the 1984 Summer Olympics played a major role in FIFA's decision. This criticism diminished somewhat when a 1–0 win against Trinidad and Tobago, the U.S.'s first away win in nearly two years, in the last match of the 1989 CONCACAF Championship, earned the United States their first World Cup appearance in 40 years.

When the Americans qualified for the 1990 FIFA World Cup, the U.S. had no professional outdoor league, had not participated in World Cup play since 1950, and U.S. youth national team programs were only a decade old. With the U.S. set to host the 1994 FIFA World Cup, coach Bob Gansler and his assistants, Joe Machnik and Ralph Perez, selected a squad to compete at Italia 1990 and gain valuable World Cup experience for 1994.

Several older professionals who had played in the NASL, MISL, or semiprofessional leagues were not selected, including Rick Davis and Hugo Perez, who were recovering from serious injuries. With a young, inexperienced team, the U.S. lost their group stage matches to Czechoslovakia (5-1), Italy (1-0) and Austria (2-1).

Six players from the 1990 World Cup roster — Marcelo Balboa, Paul Caligiuri, John Harkes, Tony Meola, Tab Ramos, and Eric Wynalda — featured for the U.S. at USA 1994. All six started each match during group play, with Meola, Balboa, Caligiuri, and Ramos also starting the quarterfinal match against Brazil.

=== CONCACAF success ===
In March 1991, the United States won the North America Cup, tying Mexico 2–2 and beating Canada 2–0. This was followed in May by a 1–0 victory over Uruguay in the World Series of Soccer. The national team then went undefeated in the 1991 Gold Cup, beating Mexico 2–0 in the semifinals and Honduras 4–3 on penalty kicks after a 0–0 draw in the final. In 1992, the U.S. continued its run of success, taking the U.S. Cup with victories over Ireland and Portugal, followed by a draw with Italy.

=== Hosting the 1994 World Cup ===
Having qualified automatically as host, the U.S. opened their tournament schedule with a 1–1 draw against Switzerland in the Pontiac Silverdome in the suburbs of Detroit, the first World Cup game played indoors. In its second game, the U.S. faced Colombia, then ranked fourth in the world, at the Rose Bowl, and the United States won 2–1. Despite a 1–0 loss to Romania in its final group game, the U.S. made it to the knockout round for the first time since 1930.

In the second round, the U.S. lost 1–0 to the eventual champion Brazil.

=== 1998 World Cup ===
In the 1998 World Cup in France, the team lost all of their three group matches, 0–2 to Germany, 1–2 to Iran, and 0–1 to the Federal Republic of Yugoslavia, and so finished in last place in its group and 32nd in the field of 32. Head coach Steve Sampson received much of the blame for the performance as a result of abruptly cutting team captain John Harkes, whom Sampson had named "Captain for Life" shortly before, as well as several other players who were instrumental to the qualifying effort, from the squad. Sampson kept secret the reason for dropping Harkes for years, and it was not until February 2010 that Eric Wynalda publicly revealed in front of a gathering of news media that this was due to Harkes having an "inappropriate relationship" with Wynalda's wife at the time. Sampson confirmed this to be true a few days later.

== 2000s: A power in CONCACAF ==
=== 2002 FIFA World Cup: quarterfinalists ===
The United States won the 2002 Gold Cup to set up the team's best performance since 1930 in the 2002 World Cup, when the U.S. team reached the quarter-finals. The knockout stage was reached through a 3–2 win over Portugal and a 1–1 tie with co-host and eventual fourth-place finisher, South Korea, rendering a 3–1 loss to Poland in the final game irrelevant.

This set the stage for a Round 2 face-off with familiar continental rivals Mexico. The U.S. emerged victorious in the first World Cup showdown between the two old adversaries, 2–0. The team lost 1–0 to eventual runners-up Germany in the quarterfinals after a controversial no-call on a handball committed by the Germans thwarted an American goal. The United States followed up this success by winning their third Gold Cup, and second out of three, in 2005.

=== 2006 FIFA World Cup: High hopes and disappointment ===
After finishing top of the CONCACAF qualification tournament, the U.S. were drawn into Group E along with the Czech Republic, Italy, and Ghana. Since three of the teams were ranked in the top 10 of the FIFA World Rankings at the time, it was considered a group of death.

The United States opened their tournament with a 3–0 defeat to the Czech Republic. The team then drew 1–1 against Italy, the only game which the Italians failed to win before the tournament final against France. The United States were then knocked out of the tournament after being beaten 2–1 by Ghana in their final group match.

=== 2010 FIFA World Cup cycle ===
MLS coach Bob Bradley was named interim coach on December 8, 2006, following the team's disappointing showing in the 2006 World Cup. Bradley started with a series of friendly matches and led the team to a 3–0–1 record. This included wins over Ecuador, Denmark, and rival Mexico. After this early success, the U.S. Soccer Federation removed Bradley's interim title on May 15, 2007, and he became the 33rd coach in the history of the Men's National Team.

From 2007 to 2009, the United States national team played 16 international friendly matches with a record of 9–4–3. Notable matches include a 2–0 victory over Mexico, a 0–0 tie with Argentina, 2–0 victories over Sweden in 2008, and 3–2 victory against Sweden in 2009.

==== 2007 ====
The U.S. played in the 2007 CONCACAF Gold Cup. The United States won their 3 games in the group stage to win their group. In the elimination round, the U.S. defeated Panama 2–1 in the quarterfinals. The United States then defeated Canada in the semifinals 2–1. This set up a championship match between the United States and Mexico at Soldier Field in Chicago. The United States trailed 1–0 at halftime. The United States scored in the second half with goals from Landon Donovan and Benny Feilhaber, and held on to win 2–1 for their second straight Gold Cup title.

Copa America is a tournament hosted by CONMEBOL. The team played three matches in this tournament. The Copa América games were played very shortly after the Gold Cup, so the majority of the players who played in the Copa matches were the substitutes for the team. These three matches were against Argentina, Paraguay, and Colombia; all losses for the American team. The team failed to advance out of the group stage and many blamed Bob Bradley for bringing a weakened squad to the tournament.

==== 2009 ====
The highlight of summer 2009 was the 2009 Confederations Cup, where the U.S. was drawn into Group B with Brazil, Egypt, and Italy. After losing 3–1 to Italy and 3–0 to Brazil, on the final day of group play the United States beat Egypt 3–0. This meant that the United States finished second in the group and reached the semifinals. In the semifinals, the U.S. defeated Spain 2–0. At the time, Spain was atop the FIFA World Rankings and was on a record run of 15 straight wins and 35 games undefeated (a record shared with Brazil). With the win, the United States advanced to its first-ever final in a men's FIFA tournament; however, the team lost 3–2 to Brazil after leading 2–0 at half-time.

The United States hosted the 2009 Gold Cup. Coach Bob Bradley chose a side consisting of mostly reserves. The U.S. concluded group play with two victories and a draw. In the quarterfinals, the United States defeated Panama 2–1, and in the semifinals the U.S. defeated Honduras 2–0. In the final the United States was beaten by Mexico 5–0, surrendering its 58-match unbeaten streak against CONCACAF opponents on U.S. soil. It was also the first home loss to Mexico since 1999.

==== 2010 World Cup Qualification ====
In 2008, the team started 2010 World Cup Qualifications. The U.S. defeated Barbados in a 2-leg home-and-away competition. The U.S. won seven of eight matches in the Second and Third Rounds of qualification for the 2010 World Cup in South Africa. This qualified the United States for the fourth round, or Hexagonal, against Costa Rica, El Salvador, Honduras, Mexico, and Trinidad and Tobago.

The U.S. began the Fourth round by beating Mexico 2–0, a loss that extended Mexico's losing streak against America on U.S. soil to 11 matches. Next, the United States earned a 2–2 draw away to El Salvador. Four days later, Jozy Altidore became the youngest U.S. player to score a hat-trick, and lead the United States to a 3–0 victory over Trinidad and Tobago. Next, the U.S. traveled to Costa Rica, where they were defeated 3–1. The United States rebounded three days later when they defeated Honduras 2–1. Near the end of the summer of 2009, the United States suffered a 2–1 loss to Mexico at Estadio Azteca. A few weeks later, the United States defeated El Salvador 2–1 at home. The next week, the U.S. beat Trinidad and Tobago 1–0. On October 10, 2009, the United States secured qualification to the World Cup with a 3–2 win over Honduras. Four days later, the U.S. secured first place in the Fourth round with a 2–2 draw against Costa Rica.

== 2010s ==
=== 2010 FIFA World Cup ===
In the 2010 FIFA World Cup, the U.S. team were drawn in Group C against England, Slovenia and Algeria. After drawing against England (1–1) and Slovenia (2–2), the U.S. defeated Algeria through a Landon Donovan stoppage time goal, the first time the U.S. had won its group since 1930. In the round of 16, the U.S. was eliminated by Ghana, 2–1. On FIFA's ranking of World Cup teams the U.S. finished in 12th place.

=== 2011 Gold Cup ===
In preparation for the 2011 CONCACAF Gold Cup, the U.S. played three friendlies; a 1–1 draw to Argentina, a 1–0 loss to Paraguay, and a 4–0 loss to Spain.

The United States hosted the 2011 Gold Cup. The U.S. advanced past the group stage with a pair of victories over Guadeloupe and Canada, despite losing to Panama 2–1. This was the first defeat for the U.S. in a Gold Cup group stage match, and its first ever loss to Panama. In the quarterfinals, the United States defeated Jamaica 2–0. In the semifinals the U.S. avenged their group stage defeat with a 1–0 victory over Panama, and advanced to its fourth consecutive Gold Cup final, where the team faced Mexico in a rematch of the 2009 Gold Cup final. The United States was beaten by Mexico 4–2, extending Mexico's winning streak against the U.S. to three matches. It was also the second consecutive loss to Mexico on American soil.

Following the loss, Bob Bradley was relieved of his duties as coach. On July 29, 2011, Jürgen Klinsmann was named as the national team's head coach.

=== 2012 ===
After their first six matches resulted in only a win and a draw against four losses, the U.S. embarked on a five-game winning streak. On February 29, 2012, the team won 1–0 in Italy, the first ever win for the United States over Italy. In 2012, the team began its World Cup qualification, and topped their third round qualification group with four wins, one draw and one defeat.

On June 2, 2013, the U.S. played a friendly against 2nd-ranked Germany in its Centennial celebration match at a sold out RFK Stadium in Washington D.C. The U.S. won 4–3. This was the USMNT's first win over a top 2 ranked team since the 2009 FIFA Confederations Cup.

=== 2013 ===
On June 6, 2013, the U.S. beat Jamaica 2–1. On June 11, the U.S. beat Panama 2–0 at CenturyLink Field in Seattle in front of almost 41,000 fans, the seventh largest crowd for a World Cup Qualifier on U.S. soil. The game also drew the second largest TV audience on ESPN for a U.S. World Cup Qualifier. On June 18, the U.S. followed with a 1–0 victory over Honduras at Rio Tinto Stadium. In July 2013, the US hosted and played in the 2013 CONCACAF Gold Cup where they went undefeated in the group stage and won with a 1–0 victory over Panama in the final, a victory which represented a record 11th straight win. A 4–3 victory over Bosnia in an international friendly match in Sarajevo represented the 12th straight win for the USMNT, the longest winning streak for any team in the world at that time. In the win, Jozy Altidore scored a hat trick (the second of his career) and in doing so became the first U.S. player to score a goal in five consecutive games. The match was also the USMNT's first-ever come-from-behind win in Europe.

On September 6, 2013, the 12 game winning streak came to an end when the U.S. lost to Costa Rica 3–1 at San Jose, Costa Rica. By defeating Mexico four days later, followed shortly thereafter by a 2–2 draw between Panama and Honduras, the U.S. clinched a spot in the 2014 World Cup. Next the United States beat Jamaica on the score 2–0 two late goals by Zusi and Altidore. The U.S. then defeated Panama 3–2 with two goals in stoppage time from Graham Zusi and Aron Jóhannsson.

=== 2014 FIFA World Cup ===
For the 2014 FIFA World Cup, the U.S. was drawn into Group G, along with Ghana, Germany, and Portugal. In game 1 the U.S. defeated Ghana 2–1. After Clint Dempsey scored the first goal just 29 seconds into the match, the U.S. held onto a 1–0 lead until a pass by Ghana in the box allowed André Ayew to score and tie the match 1–1 in the 82nd minute. Then, just 4 minutes later, the U.S. scored on a header off of a corner kick taken by Graham Zusi, first headed by Geoff Cameron, and then headed immediately by John Brooks, to give the U.S. the winning goal. Brooks was the first U.S. substitute player to have scored a goal in World Cup play. The Americans then played against Portugal, drawing 2–2 after conceding a last-second goal. They held Germany to a surprising 1–0 defeat in the final group game. In the Round of 16, the American team faced off against Belgium. Despite a goal in the 2nd half of the extra time scored by Julian Green, it was not enough from losing 2–1 against the Belgians, thus resulting in their second straight elimination since the 2010 FIFA World Cup.

=== 2015 Gold Cup ===
The national team's next tournament under Klinsmann was the 2015 CONCACAF Gold Cup. After qualifying from the group stage with wins over Honduras and Haiti and a draw against Panama, the U.S. defeated Cuba in the quarterfinals. However, the U.S. were eliminated by Jamaica in the semifinals by a 2–1 score before losing to Panama on penalties in the third place match. The fourth-place finish was the worst Gold Cup performance by the national team since 2000, and the first time the team failed to make the tournament final since 2003. In the 2015 CONCACAF Cup playoff to determine the region's entry to the 2017 FIFA Confederations Cup, the U.S. were defeated 3–2 by Mexico at the Rose Bowl.

=== 2017 Gold Cup ===
After their disappointing fourth-place finish at the 2015 Gold Cup, the United States finished at the top of their group stage at the 2017 CONCACAF Gold Cup, with a 1–1 draw with Panama, a 3–2 win over Martinique and a 3–0 win against Nicaragua. In the quarterfinals, they beat El Salvador 2–0, with both goals scored in the first half. They also had a 2–0 win over Costa Rica in the semi-finals. In the final, they faced against Jamaica, who knocked them out in the semifinals of the 2015 tournament. They won the game 2–1, thanks to a winner from Jordan Morris in the final minutes of the game, and the Stars and Stripes earned their 6th ever Gold Cup triumph.

=== 2018 FIFA World Cup qualification ===
On November 13, 2015, the United States played their first 2018 FIFA World Cup qualification match against Saint Vincent and the Grenadines in the CONCACAF fourth round, whom they beat 6–1. Four days later, they had a 0–0 draw with Trinidad and Tobago. Six months after that in March 2016, the United States would suffer a 2–0 loss to Guatemala, but win the return leg 4 days later, with a 4–0 win at Mapfre Stadium. They would win their remaining two matches, and qualify for the CONCACAF fifth round, at the top of their group stage, with Trinidad and Tobago finishing second. Their qualification campaign in the Fifth round started shaky, with consecutive losses to Mexico and Costa Rica. After the Costa Rica loss, head coach Jurgen Klinsmann was fired and was replaced by former head coach of the national team, Bruce Arena. They wouldn't earn their first win until March 2017, with a 6–0 win against Honduras. Four days later, they had a 1–1 draw with Panama, when the U.S. conceded Panama's equalizer in the 43rd minute. The US would earn only 5 points in their next 4 games, before they defeated Panama 4–0 at Exploria Stadium in Orlando, Florida. Entering their final match against Trinidad and Tobago, the US needed only a draw to automatically qualify for the 2018 FIFA World Cup finals. But a shocking 2–1 win for the Soca Warriors, coupled with comeback wins by both Honduras and Panama on the same night, ended America's streak of competing in every World Cup since 1990. Bruce Arena resigned as head coach soon after the match and many players announced their retirement from the national team.

=== 2019 Gold Cup ===
The United States entered the 2019 Gold Cup as the defending champions looking for back-to-back victories. They won all three group stage matches with a 4–0 win over Guyana, a 6–0 win over Trinidad and Tobago, and a 1–0 win over Panama. They beat Curaçao 1–0 in the quarterfinals and Jamaica 3–1 in the semifinals to move on to a final matchup with Mexico. The final was scoreless through 72 minutes but a 73rd-minute goal by Jonathan dos Santos secured a 1–0 win for Mexico.

== 2020s ==
=== 2021 CONCACAF Nations League ===
In the 2019-20 Nations League the United States received automatic qualification to League A after participating in the Hex in the 2018 CONCACAF World Cup Qualifiers. The United States topped group A over Canada and Cuba to move on the inaugural Nations League Finals. The U.S. played Honduras in the Nationals League semifinals on June 3, 2021, at Empower Field at Mile High, Denver. The United States moved on to the finals thanks to an 89th-minute Jordan Siebatcheu goal that set up a rematch of the 2019 Gold Cup Final against Mexico. On June 6, 2021, the USMNT won the inaugural CONCACAF Nations League in an instant classic 3–2 win after extra time. The United States went down 1-0 after the first minute but a Gio Reyna goal equalized the game at 1-1. After going down again thanks to a goal by Diego Lainez the USMNT equalized on a Weston McKinnie header. A Christian Pulisic Penalty in Extra time won the game on the tournament for the United States.

=== 2021 Gold Cup ===
The United States came into the 2021 Gold Cup after a finals lost in the previous tournament. Despite bringing a team of mostly reserve players to the tournament, the United States topped Group B win a 1–0 win over Haiti, a 6–1 win over Martinique, and a 1–0 win over Canada. This put them into the quarterfinals against Jamaica, with the U.S. winning 1–0 and advancing in the semifinals against Qatar. They won against Qatar 1-0 putting them into the finals against Mexico, where, after a scoreless 90 minutes, a Miles Robinson header in the 116th minute resulted in a 1-0 extra time victory and gave the U.S. their seventh Gold Cup title.

=== 2022 World Cup qualification ===
Due to schedule changes caused by the pandemic, the traditional Hexagonal became an Octagonal, which the United States automatically qualified for as one of the top-five CONCACAF teams in the FIFA rankings, alongside Mexico, Costa Rica, Honduras, and Jamaica. Joining them were three teams who had advanced from the second round: El Salvador, Canada, and Panama. Team USA ultimately finished third, ensuring their return to World Cup competition after their absence in 2018, despite fielding the youngest team out of the 32 qualified nations with an average age of just 24 years. Highlights included a 4–1 victory away to Honduras, which was the United States' first road victory in the final round of World Cup qualifying since defeating Panama in 2013, a victory against Mexico–U.S.'s third straight against them in all competitions–by the infamous "Dos A Cero" scoreline, a grueling 3–0 home win against Honduras, where the extreme cold temperatures of Minnesota caused U.S. goalkeeper Matt Turner as well as several Honduran players to suffer from frostbite, and a 5–1 drubbing of Panama, in which Christian Pulisic scored his first ever hat-trick for the national team.

=== 2022 World Cup ===
On April 1, 2022, the United States were drawn into Group B alongside England, Iran and the winners of the UEFA second round path A, which were unknown at the time of the draw but were later revealed to be Wales. The U.S. played their first group game on November 21, the second day of the tournament, against Wales. A Timothy Weah goal gave the Americans the lead in the first half, but in the second half, Gareth Bale won and converted a penalty to equalize, and the game ended in a 1-1 draw. The second game was on November 25 against England, which was an evenly matched game with few chances that ended in a 0-0 draw, the first World Cup clean sheet by the U.S. against a European team since the aforementioned 1950 victory over the Three Lions. This set the stage for the final group game on November 29 against Iran. Regardless of the result of the other game between England and Wales, a win by the U.S. would put them through, while a draw or defeat would see their World Cup journey end there. The U.S. took opened the scoring late in the first half via a goal from Pulisic, who injured himself in the process when he collided with the Iranian goalkeeper, causing him to be substituted at halftime. In the second half, Iran failed to equalize and the U.S. won 1-0, finishing in second place in the group and advancing to the knockout stage as one of only five undefeated teams and the only team not to concede a non-penalty goal. In the Round of 16, the U.S. faced the winners of Group A, the Netherlands. An early first half goal by Memphis Depay and a stoppage time strike by Daley Blind saw the Dutch take a 2-0 lead into halftime. In the second half, the U.S. would pull one back through Haji Wright but soon after, Denzel Dumfries restored the Netherlands' two goal advantage and the U.S. lost the game 3-1, falling in the Round of 16 for the third time in the last four World Cup tournaments.

=== 2024: Second Gregg Berhalter stint and firing ===
Following the World Cup, head coach Gregg Berhalter, whose contract had expired, was not immediately renewed. Assistant coach Anthony Hudson was named as the caretaker manager, but was replaced by B. J. Callaghan after just four games in charge. Under Hudson and Callaghan, the United States won their second consecutive CONCACAF Nations League title after defeating Canada 2-0 in the final, and lost in the semifinals of the 2023 CONCACAF Gold Cup to Panama on penalties.

Berhalter was re-hired as manager and resumed his duties following the Gold Cup. The first tournament of his second tenure was the 2023-24 CONCACAF Nations League, which, due to a special agreement between CONCACAF and CONMEBOL, also served as qualification for the 2024 Copa América on home soil. The United States received a bye to the quarterfinals as one of the top four teams in the CONCACAF rankings, playing a two-legged tie against Trinidad and Tobago. The U.S. won 4-2 on aggregate, advancing to the Finals and ensuring their qualification to Copa America. In the finals, the U.S. beat Jamaica 3-1 after extra time before once again defeating their arch rivals Mexico 2-0 to capture their third consecutive Nations League trophy.

At the Copa América, the U.S. put on a disappointing performance, becoming the first host nation to be eliminated in the tournament's group stage. Berhalter was dismissed as head coach on July 10, 2024.

On 10 September 2024, Argentine manager Mauricio Pochettino was announced as the new head coach of the United States national team, succeeding previous coach Gregg Berhalter. He was chosen among a list of top coaches that included Jürgen Klopp, Pep Guardiola, and Gareth Southgate. His salary was partly compensated by donations from hedge fund manager and supporter of U.S. soccer initiatives Ken Griffin, co-founder of Diameter Capital Scott Goodwin, and other commercial partners. According to news reports, it is estimated that Pochettino will earn roughly $6 million per year, making him the highest-paid coach in U.S. soccer history and one of the highest paid national team coaches in the world.

=== 2025 Gold Cup ===
The U.S. entered the 2025 Gold Cup with a relatively inexperienced squad that summer. Nearly all of the usual starters were unavailable due to commitments at the 2025 Club World Cup, injuries, or fatigue. Despite this, the team secured three straight victories against Trinidad and Tobago, Saudi Arabia, and Haiti, topping their group with a perfect record. In the quarterfinals, the U.S. played a thrilling 2–2 match against Costa Rica that went straight to a shootout afterward and the U.S. won 4–3. The U.S. next faced a motivated Guatemala who defeated Canada in an upset in the quarterfinals that ended 2–1. The U.S. played their regional rival Mexico in the final match. Chris Richards scored in the fourth minute off a set piece with a header. The lead only lasted twenty-three minutes as Raúl Jiménez equalized with a strong shot from inside the box. At the 66th minute a controversial decision occurred when Jorge Sánchez palmed the ball inside Mexico's penalty box and Mario Escobar, the referee, judged it was Sánchez's plant hand that struck the ball therefore not a handball nor penalty. Another controversial decision occurred at the 77th minute when Edson Álvarez scored off a set piece that was initially called offside until it was revised by video assistance. The match ended 2–1 to Mexico.

=== 2026 World Cup ===
Automatically qualifying as a host of the 2026 FIFA World Cup in Group D, they opened their group stage against Paraguay, finishing with a resounding 4–1 victory that was both the highest goalscoring game in U.S. World Cup history, and was tied for the biggest win for the U.S. at a World Cup since 1930. The performance received widespread praise from commentators and pundits alike, particularly for their aggressive pressing, transitions, and fluidity, with some arguing it was the greatest performance in U.S. men's national team history. The U.S. achieved another 2–0 victory in the following group stage game against a heavily-defensive Australia, marking the first time the U.S. has won multiple group stage games in 96 years. The U.S. ultimately won Group D in only 2 games after Paraguay beat Turkey, the quickest to advance in national team history and the first time since the 2010 FIFA World Cup the team won their group. As winners of Group D and their final group stage opponent Turkey already eliminated, Pochettino rested his regular 10 starters and deployed a heavily rotated bench squad, narrowly losing at the last second 2–3.

In round of 32 knockout round against Bosnia and Herzegovina, the U.S. deployed the same lineup from the opening Paraguay match, winning 2–0 after being down a man due to a controversial red card on Folarin Balogun, which was only the second U.S. win in World Cup knockout history and the first since 2002. With the win, Pochettino broke the record of the all-time wins for a U.S. manager at the World Cup with 3 victories. On July 5, Balogun's ban was controversially suspended, allowing him to play in the round of 16 match against Belgium. This decision was met with criticism over the application of disciplinary rules and claims of political interference involving the Trump administration. Against Belgium, the United States exited the tournament with a 4–1 defeat.

After the World Cup, Pochettino signed a new contract through 2030. However, months later on November 13, he would depart his role to join English Premier League side Manchester United as of November 18.

== See also ==
- History of soccer in the United States
- United States at the FIFA World Cup
- United States at the CONCACAF Gold Cup
- United States at the Copa América
