= World Series of Soccer =

The term World Series of Soccer was initially a series of senior international soccer matches held by USSF between 1991 and 1994.

In 2005, Major League Soccer re-introduced the name for a series of professional matches in the United States.

== U.S. roster ==
National Team player pool for the 1991 World Series of Soccer:

No.	Pos.	Player	Date of birth (age)	Caps	Club
1	GK	Tony Meola	21 February 1969	100	(United States) Fort Lauderdale Strikers
18	GK	Mark Dodd	14 September 1965	15	(United States) Colorado Foxes
21	DF	Fernando Clavijo	23 January 1956	61	(United States) St. Louis Storm
3	DF	John Doyle	16 April 1966	53	(Sweden) Örgryte IS
15	DF	Desmond Armstrong	2 November 1964	81	(Brazil) Santos FC
2	DF	Steve Trittschuh	24 April 1965	38	(Czechoslovakia) Sparta Prague
	DF	Janusz Michallik	22 April 1966	44	(United States) Gremio Lusitano
	DF	Bruce Savage	21 December 1960	16	(United States) Baltimore Blast
22	DF	Alexi Lalas	1 June 1970	96	(United States) Rutgers University
	DF	Robin Fraser	17 December 1966	27	(United States) Colorado Foxes
	DF	Troy Dayak	21 January 1971	9	(United States) San Francisco Bay Blackhawks
17	DF	Marcelo Balboa	8 August 1967	128	(United States) San Francisco Bay Blackhawks
	DF	Jimmy Banks	2 September 1964	36	(United States) Milwaukee Wave
12	DF	Jeff Agoos	2 May 1968	134	(United States) University of Virginia
	DF	Troy Snyder	24 November 1965	5	(United States) Dallas Sidekicks
12	MF	Paul Krumpe	4 March 1963	25	(United States) Colorado Foxes
9/14/16	MF	Brian Quinn	24 May 1960	48	(United States) San Diego Sockers
9	MF	Tab Ramos	21 September 1966	81	(Spain) Figueres
6	MF	John Harkes	8 March 1967	90	(England) Sheffield Wednesday
19	MF	Chris Henderson	11 December 1970	79	(United States) UCLA
8	MF	Dominic Kinnear	26 July 1967	56	(United States) San Francisco Bay Blackhawks
7	MF	Hugo Perez	8 November 1963	73	(Sweden) Örgryte IS
20	MF	Paul Caligiuri	9 May 1964	110	(Germany) Hansa Rostock
8	MF	Henry Gutierrez	28 August 1968	1	(France) Stade Rennais F.C.
	FW	Steve Rammel	20 April 1968	0	(United States) Rutgers University
10	FW	Peter Vermes	21 November 1966	67	(United States) Tampa Bay Rowdies
11	FW	Eric Wynalda	9 June 1969	107	(United States) San Francisco Bay Blackhawks
4	FW	Bruce Murray	25 January 1966	86	(United States) Maryland Bays
14	FW	Frank Klopas	1 September 1966	39	(Greece) AEK Athens
7/9	FW	Dante Washington	21 November 1970	6	(United States) Radford University

== 1991 ==
In 1991, the United States Soccer Federation (USSF), established and promoted a series of national team games between the United States men's national soccer team and other national soccer teams. The goal was to provide U.S. soccer players on the national team an opportunity to play high level competitive soccer. The collapse of the North American Soccer League had removed the ability of U.S. players getting meaningful outdoor experience. While indoor soccer was booming, USSF didn't see it as an adequate replacement for outdoor competition when it came to preparing players for international outdoor soccer.

=== Results ===
May 5 San Diego California United States 1-0 Uruguay

- Vermes (Henderson)-26

May 19 Stanford Stadium Palo Alto United States 0-1 Argentina

June 1 Foxboro Stadium Foxborough United States 1-1 Ireland

- Wynalda (Henderson)-68

November 24. Texas Stadium Irving United States 1-1 Costa Rica

- Kinnear (Murray)-6

== 1992 ==
=== Results ===
May 30, 1992 RFK Stadium Washington United States 3–1 Ireland (match part of 1992 U.S. Cup)

- Balboa, Ramos, Harkes,

June 3, 1992 Soldier Field Chicago United States 1–0 Portugal (match part of 1992 U.S. Cup)

- Wegerle

June 6, 1992 Soldier Field Chicago United States 1–1 Italy (match part of 1992 U.S. Cup)

- Harkes

== 1993 ==
In 1993, USSF resurrected the World Series of Soccer to prepare the national team for the 1994 FIFA World Cup. As the host nation, the U.S. did not need to qualify. Therefore, USSF sought other games to provide the team with competitive experience.

=== Results ===
Jan 30 United States 2-2 Denmark

- Murray, Moore

Feb 13 United States 0-1 Russia

Feb 21 United States 0-0 Russia

May 8 United States 1-2 Colombia

- Lalas

June 6 Yale Bowl New Harven United States 0-2 Brazil (match part of 1993 U.S. Cup)

June 9 Foxboro Stadium Foxborough United States 2-0 England (match part of 1993 U.S. Cup)

- Dooley, Lalas

June 13 Soldier Field Chicago United States 3-4 Germany (match part of 1993 U.S. Cup)

- Dooley (2), Stewart

== 1994 ==
In 1994, the U.S. national team played three matches in Ohio, billed by USSF as part of the World Series of Soccer:

=== Results ===
May 21, 1994 United States 2-3 Bayern Munich

- Klopas-(Unassisted)-21
- Klopas-(C. Jones)-37

May 25 United States 0-0 Saudi Arabia

May 28 United States 1-1 Greece

- Klopas-(Caligiuri)-45
