= 1995 U.S. Cup =

Soccer tournament

- Genre: Sporting Event
- Date: June
- Country: United States
- Participants: United States; Colombia; Mexico; Nigeria

The 1995 U.S. Cup was a four nation invitational tournament organized by the United States Soccer Federation (USSF) in June 1995. USSF began the U.S. Cup in 1992 and it was played annually until 2000, except for the World Cup years of 1994 and 1998. The cup used a round-robin format in which the team with the highest number of points took the title. The four teams included the host United States, along with Mexico, Colombia, and Nigeria. This was the first year that these three invited teams participated in a U.S. Cup. The U.S. won the title for the second time this year.

== June 11: US vs. Nigeria ==
Both teams had new coaches coming into the game. While the Nigerians had performed well at the 1994 World Cup, it was missing many of its top players from that competition while the U.S. had most of its veteran core intact. Alexi Lalas, one of the vocal leaders of the U.S. team, arrived just hours before the game after a trans-Atlantic flight from Italy. He made the last minute trip in order to play in his club side's vital win to avoid relegation. The Nigerians showed well early, going on the attack from the opening whistle. In the 8th minute, Jay-Jay Okocha ran unmarked across the top of the box with the ball, shooting into the goal. While John Harkes countered with a long range shot of his own, the Nigerians continued to run at a shaky U.S. defense. In the 19th minute, U.S. defender Mike Burns attempted to clear shot a cross, but instead put it into the path of Taiwo Wasui to score from 8 yards. Burns redeemed himself when Marcelo Balboa, earning his 100th cap in this game, headed in a goal off his free kick just before the half. In the second half, the U.S. defense gradually came to grips with the Nigerian offense, while the U.S. began to exploit seams in the Nigerian defense. Several U.S. players wasted good opportunities until Cobi Jones scored off an Earnie Stewart feed in the 87th minute. The Nigerians continued to press for the tying goal and almost had it, but Lalas cleared a shot off the goal line.

June 11, 1995

United States	3–2	Nigeria
Harkes 11'; Balboa 45+1'; Jones 68'	(Report)	Okocha 9'; Wasiu 20'

Foxboro Stadium
Attendance: 22,578
Referee: Jerome (Canada)

United States: Brad Friedel, Brian Bliss (Alexi Lalas 46'), Mike Burns, Thomas Dooley, Mike Sorber, Marcelo Balboa, Paul Caligiuri, Frank Klopas, John Harkes, Roy Wegerle (Cobi Jones 46'), Ernie Stewart (Jovan Kirovski 71')

Nigeria: Peter Rufai, Benedict Iroha, Bawa Abdullahi, Chidi Nwanu, Godwin Okpara, Austin Okocha, John Zaki (Chukwu Ndukwe 55'), Ajibade Babalade (Uchenna Okafor 66'), Edema Fuludu (Taiwo Enegwa 55'), Samson Siasia, Taiwo Wasui

== June 17: Colombia vs. Nigeria ==
June 17, 1995

Colombia	1–0	Nigeria
Gomez 79'	(Report)

Rutgers Stadium
Attendance: 15,216
Referee: Esfandiar Baharmast (USA) (USA)

Colombia: Miguel Ángel Calero, Diego Osorio, Alexander Fernandez, Jorge Bermúdez, José Fernando Santa, Harold Lozano, Luis Quiñónez, Bonner Mosquera, Hermán Gaviria, Freddy Rincón, Carlos Valderrama, Freddy Leon, Faustino Asprilla, Gabriel Jaime Gómez

Nigeria: Peter Rufai (HT. Ike Sorounmu), Abdullahi, Chidi Nwanu, Godwin Okpara, Benedict Iroha (Okpara 72’), Uche Okafor, George Fuludu, Enegwea, Jonathan Akpoborie (Taiwo Wasui 76’), Chukwu Nduke (John Zaki 90’), Samson Siasia

== June 18: US vs. Mexico ==
Against a full Mexican team featuring Jorge Campos, Luis Hernández and Carlos Hermosillo, the game turned into the “Claudio Reyna International Soccer Coming Out Party,” as the then 22-year-old midfielder scored a goal and added two beautiful assists to lead the United States to their first official blowout of Mexico.

June 18, 1995

United States	4–0	Mexico
Wegerle 3'; Dooley 25'; Harkes 36'; Reyna 67'	(Report)

RFK Stadium
Attendance: 38,615
Referee: unknown

United States: Kasey Keller, Mike Burns, Marcelo Balboa, Alexi Lalas, Paul Caligiuri, Thomas Dooley, Mike Sorber, John Harkes, Eric Wynalda (John Kerr 71'), Roy Wegerle (Cobi Jones 20'), Claudio Reyna (Tab Ramos 71')

Mexico: Jorge Campos, Jorge Rodríguez (Missael Espinoza 68'), Guillermo Hernández (Gerardo Esquivel 46'), Manuel Vidrio, Ramón Ramírez, Ignacio Ambríz, Marcelino Bernal, Alberto García Aspe (Alberto Coyote 86'), Luis García, Carlos Hermosillo, Luis Robert Alves (Joaquín del Olmo 73')

== June 21: Mexico vs. Colombia ==
June 21, 1995

Mexico	0–0	Colombia
	(Report)

RFK Stadium
Attendance: 20,432
Referee: Raul Dominguez (USA)

Mexico: Jorge Campos, Jorge Rodriguez, Claudio Suarez, Manuel Vidrio, Ramon Ramírez (Joaquin del Olmo 70’), Ignacio Ambriz, Marcelino Bernal, Alberto Garcia Aspe (Manuel Martinez 83’), Benjamin Galindo (Alberto Coyote 71’), Luis Garcia, Carlos Hermosillo (Luis Alves Zague 45’)

Colombia: René Higuita, Alexis Mendoza, Wilmer Cabrera, Diego Osorio, Giovannis Cassiani, Hermán Gaviria, Leonel Álvarez, Carlos Valderrama (captain), Harold Lozano, Freddy Rincón, Luis Quiñónez, Niver Arboleda, Faustino Asprilla, Freddy Leon

== June 24: Mexico vs. Nigeria ==
June 24, 1995

Mexico	2–1	Nigeria
Aspe 57'; Ambriz 77'	(Report)	Akpoborie 46'

Cotton Bowl
Attendance: 27,166
Referee: Arturo Angeles (USA)

Mexico: Jorge Campos, Claudio Suarez, Perales, Ramon Ramirez (Missael Espinoza 46’), Jorge Rodriguez, Ignacio Ambriz, Marcelino Bernal, Alberto Garcia Aspe (Alberto Coyote 69’), Carlos Hermosillo (Luis Garcia 46’), Joaguin del Olmo, Luis Alves Zague

Nigeria: Ike Sorounmu, Benedict Iroha (Godwin Okpara 67’), Chidi Nwanu, Uche Okafor, Ajifade Babalade, Jonathan Akpoborie, George Fuludu, Chukwu Ndukwe (Imenger 46’) (Taiwo Wasui 87’), Enegwea, Samson Siasia

== June 25: US vs. Colombia ==
In a 0-0 tie with Colombia, the U.S. took its second U.S. Cup title. In the first game against Nigeria, a Mike Burns error led to the second Nigerian goal. Today, he headed clear an injury time shot from the goal line to preserve the tie.

June 25, 1995

United States	0–0	Colombia
	(Report)

Rutgers Stadium
Attendance: 36,126
Referee: Rafael Rodriguez Medina (SLV)(El Salvador)

United States: Brad Friedel, Marcelo Balboa, Alexi Lalas, Mike Burns, Paul Caligiuri (Brian Bliss 86'), Thomas Dooley (captain) (Chris Henderson 66'), Mike Sorber, John Harkes, Eric Wynalda, Claudio Reyna (Jovan Kirovski 64'), Frank Klopas (Cobi Jones 51')

Colombia: René Higuita, José Santa, Alex Fernández (Alexis Mendoza 46'), Jorge Bermúdez, Wilmer Cabrera, Leonel Álvarez, Bonner Mosquera (Hermán Gaviria 46'), Carlos Valderrama (captain), Freddy Rincón, Níver Arboleda (Luis Quinonez 73'), John Jairo Gómez (Freddy León 58')

== Champion ==
1995 U.S. Cup Winner:

United States
Second title

== Scorers ==
Two Goals

- (United States) John Harkes

One Goal

- (Colombia) Gabriel Gómez
- (Mexico) Ignacio Ambriz
- (Mexico) Alberto García Aspe
- (Nigeria) Jonathan Akpoborie
- (Nigeria) Jay-Jay Okocha
- (Nigeria) Taiwo Wasui
- (United States) Marcelo Balboa
- (United States) Thomas Dooley
- (United States) Cobi Jones
- (United States) Claudio Reyna
- (United States) Roy Wegerle

== Final rankings ==
Team		Pts	GP	W	T	L	GF	GA	Dif	Perc
1	United States	7	3	2	1	0	7	2	+5	77.8%
2	Colombia	5	3	1	2	0	1	0	+1	55.6%
3	Mexico	4	3	1	1	1	2	5	-3	44.4%
4	Nigeria	0	3	0	0	3	3	6	-3	00,0%
