= Jonathan Akpoborie =

Nigerian former football forward

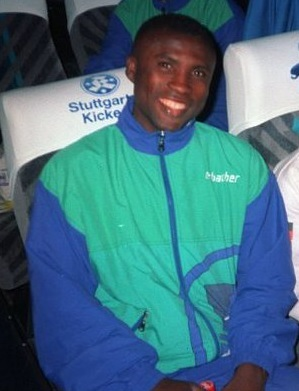
- Akpoborie during his time at Stuttgarter Kickers

Personal information
- Date of birth: 20 October 1968 (age 58)
- Place of birth: Lagos, Nigeria
- Height: 1.70 m (5 ft 7 in)
- Position: Forward

Youth career
- 1987: Julius Berger F.C.
- 1987–1990: Brooklyn College

Senior career*
Years	Team	Apps	(Gls)
1990–1992	1. FC Saarbrücken	53	(9)
1992–1994	Carl Zeiss Jena	74	(26)
1994–1995	Stuttgarter Kickers	32	(37)
1995	Waldhof Mannheim	18	(9)
1996–1997	Hansa Rostock	47	(20)
1997–1999	VfB Stuttgart	58	(22)
1999–2001	VfL Wolfsburg	39	(20)
2001–2002	1. FC Saarbrücken	4	(0)
Total		325	(143)

International career
1992–2001	Nigeria	13	(4)
- * Club domestic league appearances and goals

Jonathan Akpoborie (born 20 October 1968) is a Nigerian former professional footballer who played as a forward and spent the majority of his playing career in Germany.

== Club career ==
Akpoborie started his professional career at Julius Berger, before moving to USA. In 1990, he joined 1. FC Saarbrücken of German 2. Bundesliga. Akpoborie also had spells with FC Carl Zeiss Jena, Stuttgart Kickers, for whom he scored 37 goals in one season, and Waldhof Mannheim, before finally joining top-flight FC Hansa Rostock in 1995. After spending two years at Hansa, the player moved to their Bundesliga rivals VfB Stuttgart and then VfL Wolfsburg in 1999.

Akpoborie finished his playing career at Saarbrücken in 2002.

== International career ==
Akpoborie was part of the Nigeria team that won the first edition of the FIFA U-16 Championship in 1985, scoring in the final against the then West Germany. Two years later, he featured for the Flying Eagles at the 1987 FIFA World Youth Championship in Chile.

He attended and played for Brooklyn College.

At the senior level, he was selected for the 1992 and 2000 Africa Cup of Nations where he won bronze and silver respectively. His first senior cap was in a 1992 Africa Cup of Nations Third-place match against Cameroon, which the Super Eagles won. He scored his first goal for the Super Eagles against Mexico at the 1995 U.S. Cup on 24 June 1995. He got his second goal – a 48th-minute equalizer – in a 1–1 draw with Kenya in a 1998 FIFA World Cup qualification match on 12 January 1997.

Akpoborie was surprisingly dropped from Nigeria's squad for the 1998 FIFA World Cup by Bora Milutinović, in spite of the fact that he played in five of the six 1998 FIFA World Cup qualification matches and was the joint second top scorer in the 1997-98 UEFA Cup Winners' Cup tournament. He was also one of the two Nigerian footballers to play in a European Cup final that year, the other being Inter Milan defender Taribo West, who was red-carded in the 1998 UEFA Cup Final, less than a month to the World Cup in France.

In 1999, Dutch manager Thijs Libregts recalled him to the national side in a 2000 Africa Cup of Nations (AFCON) qualifier against Senegal. The game ended in a 1–1 draw, with Akpoborie scoring his third international goal. Nigeria did not play any qualifier after the game as they qualified as hosts of the 2000 AFCON after Zimbabwe – the originally designated host – failed to get a guarantee from the government.

Akpoborie featured in a number of games ahead of the 2002 FIFA World Cup. In the 2002 FIFA World Cup qualification – CAF first round, he scored his fourth goal in Nigeria's 4–0 win over Eritrea in Lagos.

== Slave ship allegations ==
In 2001, Akpoborie made the headlines when a boat, managed by his family, was stopped in Benin after allegations that it was carrying children into slavery in Gabon. The incident led to Akpoborie's suspension from the Wolfsburg team and eventually, after a brief sojourn at Saarbrücken, to his retirement. The story of the ship, her passengers and her owner has been covered by the documentary Das Schiff des Torjägers (The Goalgetter's Ship) by Swiss director Heidi Specogna.

== Personal life ==
Akpoborie now resides in Lagos. He works as a player agent for Rogon Sports Management.
