= 1992 U.S. Cup =

Tournament details
- Host country: United States
- Dates: 30 May – 7 June
- Teams: 4 (from 2 confederations)
- Venues: 3 (in 3 host cities)

Final positions
- Champions: United States
- Runners-up: Italy
- Third place: Republic of Ireland
- Fourth place: Portugal

Tournament statistics
- Matches played: 6
- Goals scored: 11 (1.83 per match)
- Attendance: 187,829 (31,305 per match)
- Top scorer: (United States) John Harkes (2 goals)

The 1992 United States Cup (U.S. Cup) was a United States Soccer Federation (USSF) organized international football tournament which took place in May and June 1992. This was the inaugural U.S. Cup, a tournament which ran until 2000, except for the World Cup years of 1994 and 1998.

In this first U.S. Cup, the United States hosted Italy, Ireland and Portugal in a round robin tournament. The team with the highest number of points at the end of the tournament won the competition. The United States exceeded expectations by winning the first U.S. Cup.

== United States vs Ireland ==
=== Summary ===
The United States defeated Ireland in the opening game. While the score of this game would suggest a United States dominance, the game was much closer than 3-1. The match was scoreless at halftime. Ireland scored first when Mick McCarthy headed in a cross from Steve Staunton in the 51st minute. The United States scored three minutes later when Marcelo Balboa scored from a set play. The United States scored again when Fernando Clavijo passed to Tab Ramos, who scored from 20 yards. Clavijo came on for Chris Henderson who went off injured after himself replacing Peter Vermes at half time. John Harkes scored the United States's third goal in the 87th minute.

=== Detail ===
May 30, 1992

United States	3–1	Republic of Ireland
Balboa 54'; Ramos 70'; Harkes 87'	Report	McCarthy 51'

Robert F. Kennedy Memorial Stadium, Washington, D.C.
Attendance: 35,696
Referee: Michael Mike Seifert (CAN) (Canada)

United States	Ireland

GK	1	Tony Meola
DF	17	Marcelo Balboa
DF	3	John Doyle
DF	10	Peter Vermes	(substituted off) 59'
MF	5	Thomas Dooley
MF	20	Paul Caligiuri
MF	14	Brian Quinn
MF	6	John Harkes
MF	9	Tab Ramos	(substituted off) 79'
MF	7	Hugo Perez	(substituted off) 53'
FW	4	Bruce Murray	(substituted off) 46'
Substitutes:
FW	22	Roy Wegerle	(substituted on) 46'
MF	12	Earnie Stewart	(substituted on) 53'
DF	2	Janusz Michallik	(substituted on) 79'
MF	19	Chris Henderson	(substituted on) 59' (substituted off) 59'
MF	21	Fernando Clavijo	(substituted on) 59'
Manager:
Bora Milutinović

GK	Gerry Peyton
DF	Chris Morris	(substituted off) 78'
DF	Kevin Moran
DF	Mick McCarthy
DF	Terry Phelan
DF	Paul McGrath
DF	Steve Staunton	(substituted off) 60'
MF	Ray Houghton
MF	Roy Keane	(substituted off) 78'
MF	Andy Townsend
FW	Niall Quinn
Substitutes:
DF	Denis Irwin	(substituted on) 78'
MF	Alan McLoughlin	(substituted on) 78'
FW	Tommy Coyne	(substituted on) 60'
Manager:
Jack Charlton

== May 31: Italy vs Portugal ==
In the second game, Italy and Portugal played to a scoreless draw. Both teams had players sent off, Roberto Donadoni (Italy) in the 84th minute and Leal (Portugal) in the 86th minute.

May 31, 1992
21:00

Italy	0–0	Portugal
	(Report)

Yale Bowl, New Haven
Attendance: 38,833
Referee: Raul J. Dominguez (USA)

Italy	Portugal

Italy: Walter Zenga, Moreno Mannini, Paolo Maldini, Luca Fusi (Galia 78’), Franco Baresi, Alessandro Costacurta, Roberto Baggio (Casiraghi 71’), Bianchi (Giuseppe Signori 85’), Donadoni, Vialli, Di Chiara (Lombardo 35’)

Portugal: Vítor Baía, J. Couto (António da Silva Samuel 39’), Paulo Madeira, Leal, João V. Pinto, Luís Figo (Filipe 87’), Rui Filipe, Peixe (Domingos 85’), Vítor Paneira (Jaime Magalhães 46’), Jorge Cadete (Semedo 86’), João D. Pinto

== June 3: USA vs Portugal ==
The United States won a 1-0 victory over Portugal in front of only 10,402 fans at Chicago's Soldier Field. In the 35th minute, Roy Wegerle, breaking down the middle, took a long pass from Bruce Murray. Wegerle ran through the Portuguese defense and faced the Portuguese keeper, Adelino Barros. Barros rushed out to cut the angle, but Wegerle shifted the ball to his left foot and shot into the empty net.

June 3, 1992

United States	1–0	Portugal
Wegerle 35'	(Report)

Soldier Field, Chicago
Attendance: 10,402
Referee: Angelo Amendolia (ITA) (Italy)

United States	Portugal

United States: Tony Meola, Marcelo Balboa, John Doyle, Thomas Dooley, Paul Caligiuri (Fernando Clavijo 61’), Brian Quinn, Tab Ramos, Bruce Murray (Chris Henderson 46’), John Harkes, (Janusz Michallik 78’), Hugo Perez (Earnie Stewart 68’), Roy Wegerle

Portugal: Adelino Barros, J. Couto, Torres (Filipe 34’), Paulo Madeira, João V. Pinto, Semedo, Magalhães (Cadete 46’), Luís Figo (Sousa 81’), Peixe, João D. Pinto (Paneira 46’), Domingos (Jorge Cadete 77’)

== June 4: Italy vs Ireland ==
Italy scored twice, once from normal play and the second from a penalty kick. Ireland's goalkeeper, Packie Bonner, was sent off in the 64th minute.

June 4, 1992
22:00

Italy	2–0	Republic of Ireland
Signori 17'; Costacurta 66' (pen.)	(Report)

Foxboro Stadium, Foxborough
Attendance: 34,797
Referee: Jack D'Aquila (USA) (USA)

Italy	Ireland

Italy: Walter Zenga, Franco Baresi (Ferri 77’), Paolo Maldini, Alessandro Costacurta, Bianchi (Lombardo 73’), Galia, Fusi (Venturin 46’), Carboni (Mannini 51’), Giuseppe Signori, Mancini (Vialli 80’), Casiraghi

Ireland: Bonner, Steve Staunton, O.Leary, McCarthy (McLoughlin 46’), Irwin (Peyton 66’), Houghton, Townsend, McGrath, McGoldrick (Phelan 80’), Niall Quinn (Tommy Coyne 72’), Aldridge (Kelly 78’)

== June 6: USA vs Italy ==
Roberto Baggio scored the first goal for Italy in the second minute. However, John Harkes of the United States scored his second goal of the tournament with a 13-yard shot in the 23rd minute. The game ended 1-1, and the United States won its first U.S. Cup.

June 6, 1992
21:00

United States	1–1	Italy
Harkes 23'	(Report)	Baggio 2'

Soldier Field, Chicago
Attendance: 26,874
Referee: Jose Luis Vargas Gonzalez (CRC) (Costa Rica)

United States	Italy

United States: Tony Meola, Marcelo Balboa, Thomas Dooley, John Doyle, Paul Caligiuri, Brian Quinn, Tab Ramos (Janusz Michallik 86’), Bruce Murray (Fernando Clavijo 46’), John Harkes, Hugo Pérez (Earnie Stewart 75’), Roy Wegerle

Italy: Luca Marchegiani, Franco Baresi, Paolo Maldini, Giuseppe Mannini, Roberto Galia (Alberto Di Chiara 65'), Alessandro Bianchi, Riccardo Ferri (Luca Fusi 46'), Roberto Donadoni, Giuseppe Signori, Pierluigi Casiraghi, Roberto Baggio (Gianluca Vialli 74')

== June 7: Ireland vs Portugal ==
Irish player Steven Staunton scored directly from a corner kick. Tommy Coyne scored a second Irish goal in the 89th minute.

June 7, 1992

Republic of Ireland	2–0	Portugal
Staunton 39'; Coyne 89'	(Report)

Foxboro Stadium, Foxborough
Attendance: 41,227
Referee: Helder Dias (USA) (USA)

Ireland	Portugal

Ireland: Peyton, Steve Staunton, McCarthy, O. Leary, Morris, Houghton, McLoughlin, McGrath, Phelan (McGoldrick 89’), Kelly (Tommy Coyne 58’), Niall Quinn (Aldridge 87’)

Portugal: Vítor Baía, Leal (Magalhães 71’), J. Couto (João D. Pinto 46’), Samuel, Fernando Couto, João V. Pinto, Semedo (Paulo Sousa 75’), Rui Filipe, Vítor Paneira (Filipe 46’), Luís Figo (Domingos 46’), Jorge Cadete

== Champion ==
1992 U.S. Cup Winner:

United States
First title

== Scorers ==
Two Goals

- (United States) John Harkes

One Goal

- (Italy) Roberto Baggio
- (Italy) Alessandro Costacurta
- (Italy) Giuseppe Signori
- (United States) Marcelo Balboa
- (United States) Tab Ramos
- (United States) Roy Wegerle
- (Republic of Ireland) Tommy Coyne
- (Republic of Ireland) Mick McCarthy
- (Republic of Ireland) Steve Staunton

== Final rankings ==
Team		Pts	GP	W	T	L	GF	GA	Dif	Perc
1	United States	7	3	2	1	0	5	2	+3	77.8%
2	Italy	5	3	1	2	0	3	1	+2	55.6%
3	Republic of Ireland	3	3	1	0	2	3	5	-2	33.3%
4	Portugal	1	3	0	1	2	0	3	-3	11.1%
