= 1998 MLS All-Star Game =

Soccer game played in Orlando, Florida

- Event: Major League Soccer All-Star Game
MLS USA	MLS World
(United States)	(United Nations)
6	1
- Date: August 2, 1998
- Venue: Citrus Bowl; Orlando, Florida
- Man of the Match: Brian McBride (MLS USA)
- Referee: Esse Baharmast
- Attendance: 34,416
- Weather: 92 °F (33 °C), sunny, occasional showers

The 1998 Major League Soccer All-Star Game was the 3rd Major League Soccer All-Star Game, played on August 2, 1998, at the Citrus Bowl in Orlando, Florida. A team of United States all-stars, MLS USA, beat a team of International MLS all-stars, MLS World, by a score of 6–1.

The 1998 MLS All-Star Game was preceded by a Women's international friendly match between the United States and Canada.

== Venue ==
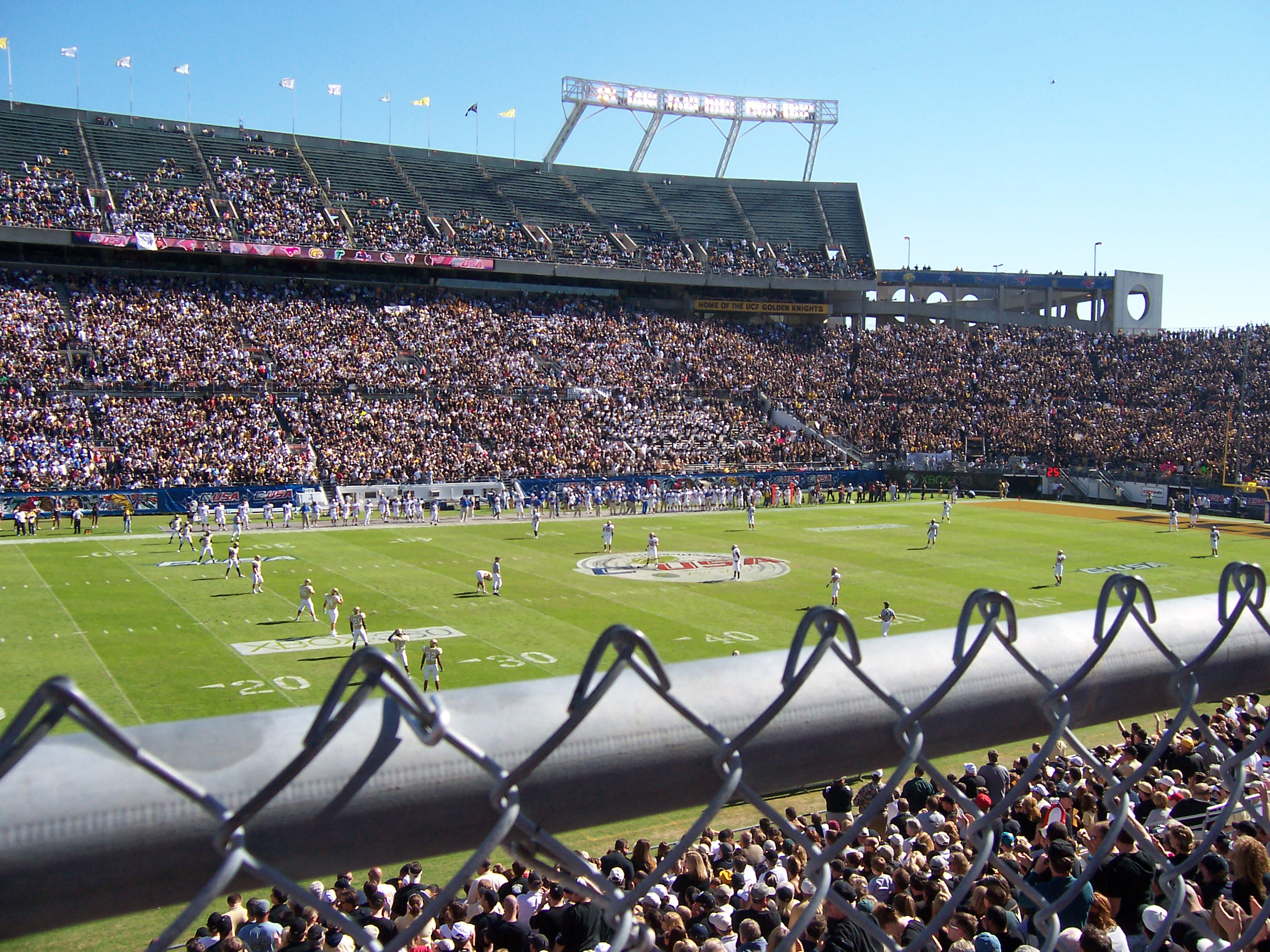
Orlando Citrus Bowl hosted the game

== Match details ==
1998 MLS All-Star Game
August 2, 1998
13:00 EDT

MLS USA (United States)	6–1	(United Nations) MLS World
T. Ramos 5'; Lalas 15'; McBride 16'; Preki 40'; Lassiter 78'; Jones 83'	Report	M. Ramos 89'

Citrus Bowl, Orlando, Florida
Attendance: 34,416
Referee: Esse Baharmast

MLS USA
MLS World

GK	1	(United States) Tony Meola	(substituted off) 46'
DF	17	(United States) Marcelo Balboa	(substituted off) 46'
DF	22	(United States) Alexi Lalas	(substituted off) 46'
DF	23	(United States) Eddie Pope
MF	13	(United States) Cobi Jones	(substituted off) 46'	(substituted in) 69'
MF	5	(United States) Thomas Dooley	(substituted off) 46'
MF	10	(United States) Tab Ramos	(substituted off) 46'
MF	6	(United States) John Harkes	(substituted off) 69'
MF	2	(United States) Frankie Hejduk	(substituted off) 46'
FW	20	(United States) Brian McBride	(substituted off) 46'
FW	11	(United States) Preki	(substituted off) 46'
Substitutions:
GK	18	(United States) Zach Thornton	(substituted in) 46'
DF	12	(United States) Jeff Agoos	(substituted in) 46'
DF	8	(United States) Robin Fraser	(substituted in) 46'
DF	4	(United States) Mike Burns	(substituted in) 46'
MF	21	(United States) Ross Paule	(substituted in) 46'
MF	14	(United States) Chris Armas	(substituted in) 46'
MF	16	(United States) Ben Olsen	(substituted in) 46'
FW	9	(United States) Paul Bravo	(substituted in) 46'
FW	15	(United States) Roy Lassiter	(substituted in) 46'
Coach:
(United States) Bruce Arena

GK	1	(Mexico) Jorge Campos	(substituted off) 46'	(substituted in) 69'
DF	5	(Canada) Geoff Aunger	(substituted off) 46'	(substituted in) 75'
DF	3	(Sweden) Jan Eriksson	(substituted off) 46'
DF	4	(Argentina) Diego Soñora	(substituted off) 46'
MF	15	(Czech Republic) Lubos Kubik	(substituted off) 46'
MF	11	(Uruguay) Adrián Paz	(substituted off) 46'
MF	12	(El Salvador) Mauricio Cienfuegos	(substituted off) 46'
MF	8	(Colombia) Carlos Valderrama	(substituted off) 75'
MF	10	(Bolivia) Marco Etcheverry	(substituted off) 46'
FW	21	(El Salvador) Raúl Díaz Arce	(substituted off) 46'
FW	9	(Bolivia) Jaime Moreno	(substituted off) 69'
Substitutions:
GK	22	(Sweden) Thomas Ravelli	(substituted in) 46'
DF	2	(Scotland) Richard Gough	(substituted in) 46'
DF	20	(Nigeria) Uche Okafor	(substituted in) 46'
MF	18	(Guatemala) Martin Machon	(substituted in) 46'
MF	7	(Colombia) Leonel Álvarez	(substituted in) 46'
MF	17	(Bolivia) Mauricio Ramos	(substituted in) 46'
FW	6	(Scotland) Mo Johnston	(substituted in) 46'
FW	19	(Brazil) Wélton	(substituted in) 46'
FW	16	(Trinidad and Tobago) Stern John	(substituted in) 46'
Coach:

Most Valuable Player:
(United States) Brian McBride (MLS USA)

Assistant referees:
Greg Barkey
Arthur Reed
