= Thomas Dooley =

American soccer player

Personal information
- Full name: Thomas Dennis Dooley
- Date of birth: May 12, 1961 (age 65)
- Place of birth: Bechhofen, West Germany
- Height: 6 ft 2 in (1.88 m)
- Position: Defensive midfielder

Youth career
- –1979: TuS Eintracht 1912 Bechhofen
- 1979–1981: TuS Landstuhl

Senior career*
Years	Team	Apps	(Gls)
1981–1983	FK Pirmasens	40	(17)
1983–1988	Homburg	121	(20)
1988–1993	1. Kaiserslautern	128	(14)
1994–1995	Bayer Leverkusen	21	(3)
1995–1997	Schalke 04	28	(3)
1997–2000	Columbus Crew	73	(7)
2000–2001	MetroStars	22	(0)
Total		433	(64)

International career
1992–1999	United States	81	(7)

Managerial career
- 2002–2003: 1. Saarbrücken
- 2011–2014: United States (assistant)
- 2014–2018: Philippines
- 2019–2020: Viettel (sporting director)
- 2021: Sri Pahang
- 2022: Philippines
- 2023–2024: Viettel
- 2025–2026: Guyana
- 2026–: Bangladesh
Medal record
Men's Soccer
Representing United States
Runner-up	CONCACAF Gold Cup	1993
Runner-up	CONCACAF Gold Cup	1998
Representing Philippines (as manager)
Runner-up	AFC Challenge Cup	2014
- * Club domestic league appearances and goals

Thomas Dennis Dooley (born May 12, 1961) is a professional soccer coach and former player who played as a defender and defensive midfielder. Born in Germany, he is a former captain of the United States national team. Dooley is the head coach of the Bangladesh national team since May 2026.

== Early life ==
Dooley was born in Bechhofen, West Germany to a German mother and a father who served in the U.S. Army.

== Club career ==
Dooley played as a forward with amateur team FK Pirmasens. He started his professional career in 1984 with third division club FC Homburg. He moved to midfield with Homburg and helped the team move steadily up the German leagues, until they finally reached the Bundesliga.

He moved to 1. FC Kaiserslautern in 1988 and helped them to the German Cup in 1990 and the Bundesliga title in 1991. He also played as they won the 1991 DFB-Supercup. After the 1994 World Cup, he moved to Bayer Leverkusen, and to Schalke 04 a year after that, helping them to the 1997 UEFA Cup title.

At the end of the season, he moved to Major League Soccer (MLS), signing with the Columbus Crew. Dooley spent three seasons in Columbus and was named to the MLS Best XI in both 1997 and 1998. In 2000, Thomas was traded to the MetroStars for Mike Duhaney, partially to help support Lothar Matthäus' adjustment to the United States. Dooley played one year for the Metros before retiring from playing football/soccer.

== International career ==
As U.S. Soccer started to look abroad for players eligible to play for its national team in advance of its hosting the 1994 FIFA World Cup, Dooley was discovered. He made his first international appearance on May 30, 1992, against Ireland. Dooley became a regular for the U.S. almost immediately, being named U.S. Soccer Athlete of the Year in 1993 and then playing every minute at the 1994 World Cup, including the match against Colombia which the U.S. won 2–1. After John Harkes was dismissed from the U.S. national team, Dooley was named captain for the 1998 World Cup, and started every game for the U.S.

On February 21, 1999, Dooley was given a send-off match by the United States in a friendly against Chile. He ended his international career with 81 caps and seven goals.

=== International goals ===
Scores and results list United States' goal tally first, score column indicates score after each Dooley goal.

List of international goals scored by Thomas Dooley
No.	Date	Venue	Opponent	Score	Result	Competition
1	June 9, 1993	Foxborough, Massachusetts	England	1–0	2–0	Friendly (1993 U.S. Cup)
2	June 13, 1993	Chicago, Illinois	Germany	1–1	3–4	Friendly (1993 U.S. Cup)
3	June 13, 1993	Chicago, Illinois	Germany	3–4	3–4	Friendly (1993 U.S. Cup)
4	July 14, 1993	Dallas, Texas	Panama	2–1	2–1	1993 CONCACAF Gold Cup
5	June 18, 1995	Washington, D.C.	Mexico	2–0	4–0	Friendly
6	June 16, 1996	Pasadena, California	Mexico	2–2	2–2	Friendly
7	November 10, 1996	Richmond, Virginia	Trinidad and Tobago	1–0	2–0	1998 FIFA World Cup Qualifying

== Managerial career ==
=== Saarbrücken ===
After retiring, Dooley went back to Germany and became the head coach of FC Saarbrücken in 2002, becoming the first American to coach a team in Europe.

=== United States ===
Dooley was appointed by U.S. national team coach Jürgen Klinsmann to be an assistant coach in the match against Mexico on August 10, 2011.

=== Philippines ===
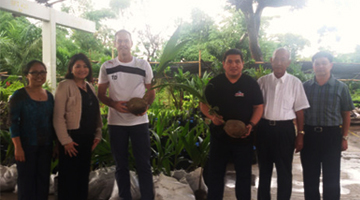
Thomas Dooley (center left) with Philippine national team coach, Dan Palami (center right) along with officials from the Institute of Plant Breeding and Philippine Council for Agriculture, Aquatic, and Natural Resources Research and Development

In February 2014, Dooley signed a one-year deal with the Philippine Football Federation to handle the Philippines national team. His first match was a friendly against Malaysia which ended 0–0, and a few days later, narrowly lost to European side Azerbaijan 1–0. Dooley earned his first win for the Philippines after his charges defeated Nepal 3–0 in another friendly match in Qatar.

Dooley earned national team coach Dan Palami's praise after his first few matches in charge. Palami commended Dooley's ability to foster a better understanding of the game to his squad and give subs and reserves chances to step up in the absence of star players. "Our players have a better understanding of the role they have to play in their respective positions under Dooley's system that anyone can step up even if we don't have our stars playing," Palami said.

The Philippine national team came close to qualifying to the 2015 AFC Asian Cup. They failed to qualify after they lost 0–1 to Palestine in the final of the 2014 AFC Challenge Cup. Two months after the tournament, Stephan Schröck and Dennis Cagara resigned from the national team over tensions with Dooley. Schröck had disagreement with the setup of the national team under Dooley but has made amends with the coach in 2015 and briefly played once again for the Philippines though undisclosed issues surfaced in 2016.

In his first match coaching the Philippines in a World Cup qualifier, Dooley's team defeated Bahrain 2–1. After an impressive run in qualifying that included a 3–2 win over North Korea that was considered an upset, Dooley's contract was extended for two years.

Dooley failed to get the Philippines past the group stage at the 2016 AFF Championship, which the Philippines co-hosted with Myanmar. He managed to secure qualification for the Philippines for their first Asian Cup stint in the 2019 by winning 2–1 over Tajikistan in March 2018. The coach's contract with the Philippines ended on March 31, 2018 after the historic match. Dooley's contract was not renewed and the PFF announced Terry Butcher as his successor in June 2018.

=== Viettel ===
In 2019, Dooley was appointed as sporting director of V.League 1 club Viettel. During his tenure, Viettel won the 2020 V.League 1 title.

=== Sri Pahang ===
In January 2021, Dooley was appointed as head coach of Malaysia Super League club Sri Pahang, replacing Dollah Salleh. Three months after his appointment, Dooley was sacked by Sri Pahang together with his assistant coach, Christophe Gamel and was replaced by former head coach Dollah Salleh. After being sacked, he was immediately appointed as adviser of Sri Pahang U21 team while Gamel was appointed as head coach.

=== Return to Philippines ===
In May 2022, Dooley was reappointed as head coach of the Philippines national team ahead of the third round of 2023 AFC Asian Cup qualifiers, replacing Scott Cooper. He signed a short-term deal with an option to extend depending on the qualification of the Philippines to the 2023 AFC Asian Cup.

=== Guyana ===
Dooley became head coach of the Guyana national team in September 2025. Dooley expressed his intention to reinforce the national team with overseas-based Guyanese players while acknowledging the role of the Elite League as the backbone of the team. Though he had emphasized that overseas-based players would not have guaranteed inclusion to the national team.

In November 2025, local-based players alleged that Dooley has berated them and dismissed the capability of the Elite League to produce capable national team players. The dispute was reportedly resolved by the GFF after a dialogue between the players and the coach. Dooley clarified that he intended to reinforce professional standards and not to demean the players.

Dooley led Guyana to win friendlies against Bonaire (2–1), Antigua and Barbuda (4–1), Dominica (2–0), and Belize. In May 2026, Dooley resigned from his position.

=== Bangladesh ===
On 22 May 2026, Dooley became the head coach of Bangladesh national team.

== Managerial statistics ==
As of match played 11 November 2026

Managerial record by team and tenure
Team	Nat.	From	To	Record								Ref.
Team	Nat.	From	To	G	W	D	L	GF	GA	GD	Win %	Ref.
Saarbrücken	(Germany)	18 January 2002	30 June 2002	15	4	2	9	16	39	−23	26.67	
Philippines	(Philippines)	3 February 2014	31 March 2018	45	20	11	14	72	57	+15	44.44	
Sri Pahang	(Malaysia)	4 January 2021	14 March 2021	3	0	1	2	1	5	−4	0.00	
Philippines	(Philippines)	25 May 2022	31 July 2022	4	2	1	1	5	5	+0	50.00	
Viettel (interim)	(Vietnam)	18 December 2023	7 January 2024	2	0	0	2	1	7	−6	0.00	
Guyana	(Guyana)	9 September 2025	12 May 2026	4	4	0	0	11	3	+8	100.00	
Guyana U20	(Guyana)	1 January 2026	12 May 2026	4	1	0	3	7	9	−2	25.00	
Bangladesh	(Bangladesh)	22 May 2026	Present	6	3	0	3	9	14	−5	50.00	
Career Total				83	34	15	34	122	139	−17	40.96	

== Honours ==
FC Homburg

- Oberliga Südwest: 1984

1. FC Kaiserslautern

- Bundesliga: 1990–91
- DFB-Pokal: 1989–90
- DFL-Supercup: 1991

FC Schalke 04

- UEFA Cup: 1996–97

Individual

- U.S. Soccer Athlete of the Year: 1993
- MLS All-Star, 1998, 1999
- MLS Best XI: 1997, 1998
- MLS Fair Play Award: 1998
- National Soccer Hall of Fame: 2010

Sporting positions
Preceded by John Harkes	United States captain 1998	Succeeded by Claudio Reyna
