= John Harkes =

American soccer player and coach

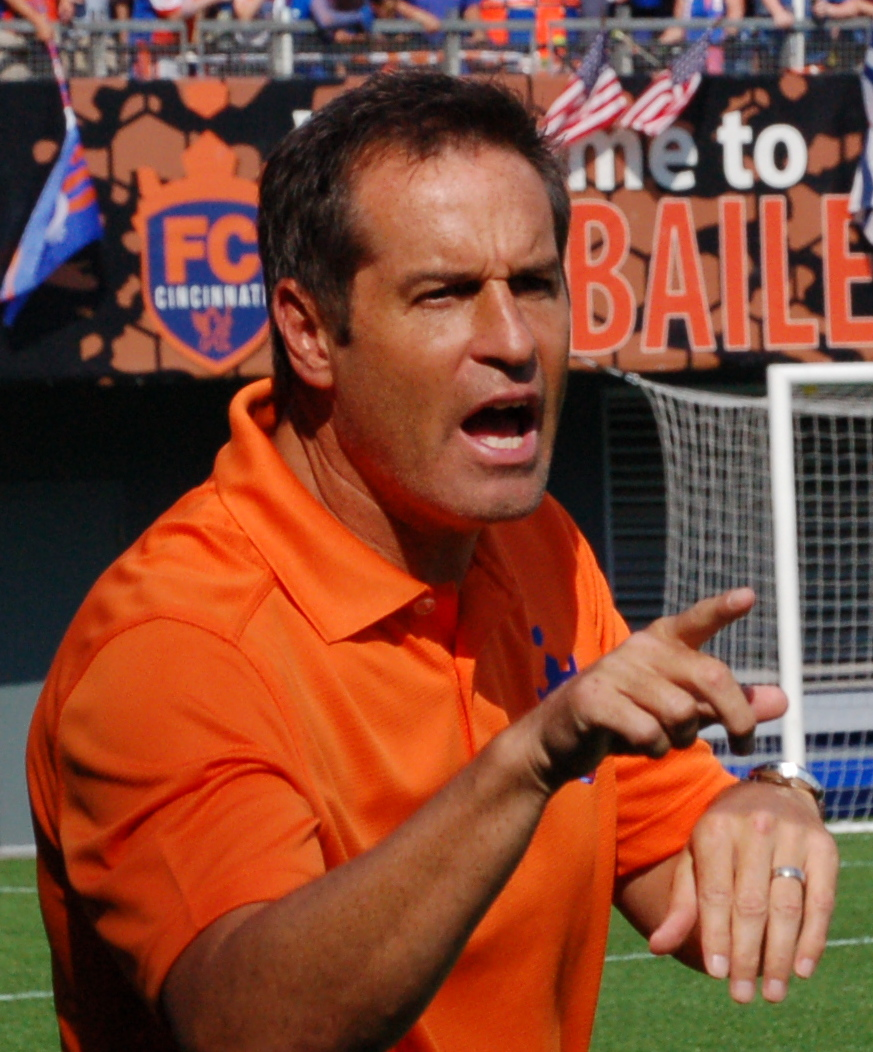
- Harkes coaching FC Cincinnati in 2016

Personal information
- Full name: John Andrew Harkes
- Date of birth: March 8, 1967 (age 59)
- Place of birth: Kearny, New Jersey, United States
- Height: 5 ft 11 in (1.80 m)
- Position: Midfielder

College career
Years	Team	Apps	(Gls)
1985–1987	Virginia Cavaliers		

Senior career*
Years	Team	Apps	(Gls)
1989	Albany Capitals	20	(0)
1990–1993	Sheffield Wednesday	82	(7)
1993–1995	Derby County	67	(5)
1995–1996	→ West Ham United (loan)	12	(0)
1996–1998	D.C. United	83	(14)
1999	→ Nottingham Forest (loan)	3	(0)
1999–2001	New England Revolution	55	(2)
2001–2002	Columbus Crew	29	(0)
Total		351	(28)

International career
1987–2000	United States	90	(6)

Managerial career
- 2006–2007: New York Red Bulls (assistant)
- 2015–2017: FC Cincinnati
- 2018–2023: Greenville Triumph
- * Club domestic league appearances and goals

John Andrew Harkes (born March 8, 1967) is an American soccer coach and former professional player who last coached Greenville Triumph SC.

A member of the National Soccer Hall of Fame, Harkes was the first American to play in the English Premier League with Sheffield Wednesday, the second American to score at Wembley, and the first American soccer player to appear in the final of a major English tournament, in the 1991 Football League Cup Final with Sheffield Wednesday. After moving to Major League Soccer in 1996, he won two MLS Cup titles with D.C. United.

A mainstay in the U.S. national team midfield for most of the 1990s, Harkes appeared in two FIFA World Cup tournaments. He was named the team's "Captain for Life" by then-head coach Steve Sampson before having that title stripped ahead of the 1998 World Cup. Harkes ended his national team career with 90 caps and six goals.

Following his retirement, he served as a color commentator for ESPN's coverage of MLS and U.S. international matches, including the 2010 FIFA World Cup.

== Amateur career ==
=== High school ===
Harkes grew up in the soccer hotbed of Kearny, New Jersey, and played youth and high school soccer with future national team teammates Tony Meola and Tab Ramos.

Harkes graduated from Kearny High School in 1985. During his high school career, Harkes played in four New Jersey State Interscholastic Athletic Association championship matches and led his team to the 1984 Group 4 State Championship and a 24–0 record. He was the 1984 Parade High School Player of the Year.

In 1999, he was named by The Star-Ledger as one of the top ten New Jersey high school soccer players of the 1980s.

=== College ===
Harkes played for University of Virginia where he was named 1st team All-American in 1986 and 1987, and was the Hermann Award winner in 1987, as the best player in US colleges.

== Professional career ==
=== England: 1990–1996 ===
Harkes moved to Sheffield Wednesday of the English Football League in 1990. In a game that season against Derby County, his 35-yard blast glided into the net past former England World Cup goalkeeper Peter Shilton and earned him English football's "Goal of the Season" award. That season, Harkes became the third American (after Bill Regan for Romford in the 1948–49 FA Amateur Cup final and Mike Masters for Colchester United in the 1991-92 FA Trophy final) to play at Wembley when Sheffield Wednesday reached the 1991 League Cup final. There, the Second Division (now Football League Championship) Wednesday upset the First Division (now Premier League) side Manchester United 1–0. Also that year, Wednesday won promotion to the First Division.

In 1993, Harkes became the only American to score in a League Cup Final, in a 2–1 loss to Arsenal. His goal was the second by an American at Wembley Stadium following Mike Masters' goal for Colchester United in the F.A. Trophy Final the year before. He appeared in the FA Cup Final one month after that League Cup disappointment, with Sheffield Wednesday again losing to Arsenal (2–1 in the replay, after a 1–1 draw in the first game). Harkes played one more season in England after moving to Derby County in the summer of 1993. In 1995, Major League Soccer (MLS) began preparing for its first season, which it first thought would come in the fall of 1995. As part of that process, MLS signed prominent U.S. players to league contracts. Harkes was one of the players who signed with MLS, only to discover the league would not begin play until 1996. Therefore, he, and MLS, negotiated a one-year loan to West Ham United.

=== Major League Soccer: 1996–2003 ===
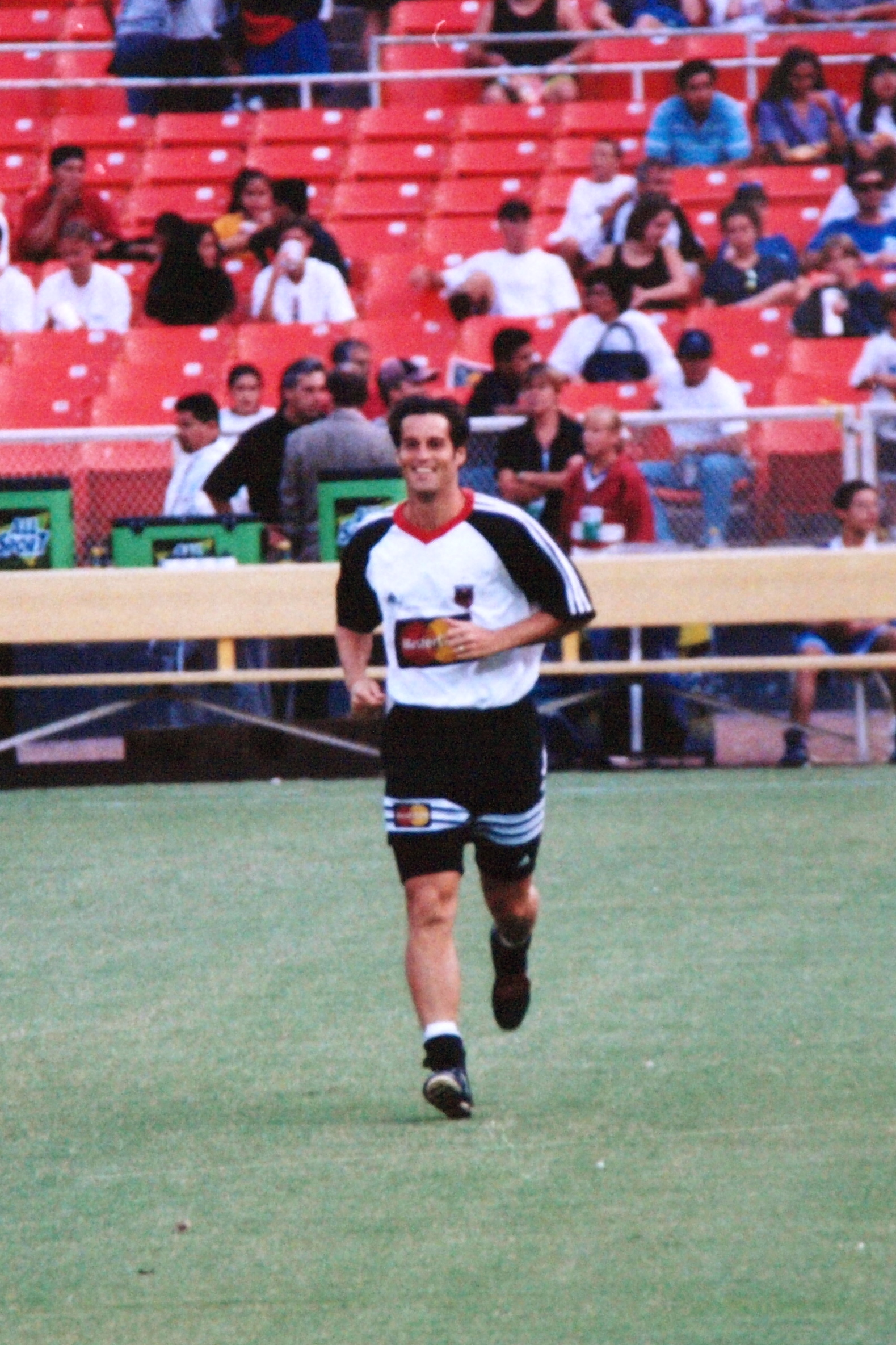
Harkes playing for D.C. United in 1997

In 1996, Harkes, along with his U.S. national teammates based overseas, returned to the U.S. for the launch of Major League Soccer. MLS had signed numerous prominent U.S. players and eventually allocated them throughout the league's teams in order to create an initial equitable distribution of talent. MLS allocated Harkes to D.C. United, making him the team's first player ever. That first season, he led the club to a MLS Cup win and a U.S. Open Cup title. D.C. United successfully defended its MLS Cup title in 1997, with Harkes assisting on the match-winning goal in the cup final.

Despite the disappointment of being left off the 1998 World Cup squad, Harkes helped United capture the Supporters Shield for the best regular season record in the league, before losing in the MLS Cup Final to the Chicago Fire. He also helped United become the first MLS club to win the CONCACAF Champions' Cup and upset Brazil's Vasco Da Gama in the Interamerican Cup.

At the end of the 1998 season, he traveled back to England for a two-week trial with Nottingham Forest. On January 28, 1999, the team accepted Harkes for a two-month loan period. He played only three games for Forest (including the infamous 8–1 defeat to Manchester United) before returning to the U.S.

==== New England Revolution ====
On February 2, 1999 While Harkes was in England, D.C. United traded him to the New England Revolution in exchange for New England’s first- and second-round picks in the 2000 MLS SuperDraft and future considerations. United traded Harkes in order to make room under the salary cap. Some uncertainty surrounded the trade, as the Revolution expected Harkes to report by March 15, while Forest insisted the loan would keep Harkes in England until the end of the Premier League season. Revolution General Manager Brian O'Donovan stated that if Harkes failed to join by mid-March, the deal would be off.

Ultimately, on March 16, Harkes' loan spell ended, allowing him to officially join New England. Harkes made his New England debut on May 15 vs. the Columbus Crew, coming on as a 75th minute substitute for Edwin Gorter. He made his first start for the Revolution on May 23 in a 1-0 loss to the LA Galaxy. He made his home debut on June 5 in a 2-0 loss to the Chicago Fire. Additionally, Harkes captained the Revolution twice in the 1999 New England Revolution season, on August 6 and October 9. He recorded 8 assists in 22 matches played during his inaugural Revolution campaign. Harkes wore the captain's armband for much of the 2000 New England Revolution season, helping the Revolution reach the MLS Playoffs for the first time since 1997. He scored his first goal for the club on June 3 in the Revolution's 2-0 win over the Miami Fusion. Harkes was the only player to represent the Revolution in the 2000 MLS All-Star Game. Harkes would make only five appearances for the Revolution during the 2001 New England Revolution season as on May 11, 2001, the Revolution dealt Harkes to the Columbus Crew in exchange for Pato Aguilera and a conditional pick in the 2002 MLS SuperDraft. After an injury-plagued 2002 season, Harkes announced his retirement in 2003.

== International career ==
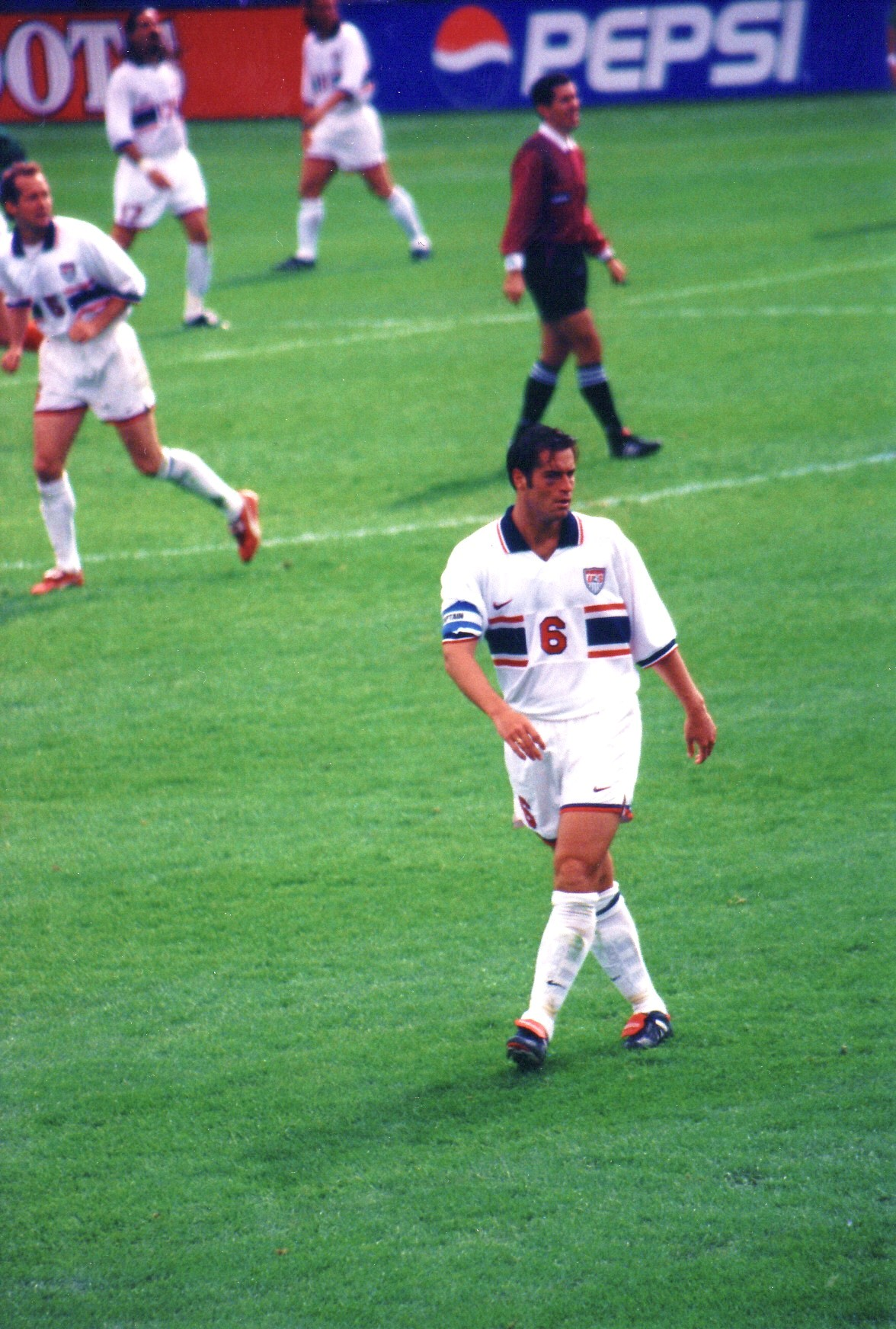
Harkes playing in a World Cup qualifying match in 1997

John Harkes played in the 1990 and 1994 FIFA World Cup Harkes made his national team debut on March 23, 1987, against Canada. He was on the U.S. team at the 1987 Pan American Games. He quickly established himself as a national team regular and was selected for the 1988 Olympics. That year the U.S. went 1–1–1 and failed to qualify for the second round. Harkes continued to play for the national team as it went through the qualification process for the upcoming World Cup. The team qualified for those games after an improbable 1–0 road victory over Trinidad and Tobago in the final qualification match.

In 1990, he was a member of a World Cup squad made up mostly of college and semi-professional players. The United States side was routed 1–5 by Czechoslovakia, but were respectable losing 0–1 to host nation and eventual semi-finalist Italy, and 1–2 to Austria. Despite losing all three matches, many players from the 1990 squad, including Harkes, Ramos, Meola, Marcelo Balboa formed the core of the U.S. national team for most of the decade and played an important role in the development of MLS.

U.S. fared better as the host nation in the 1994 World Cup, upsetting Colombia 2–1 in a group stage match to advance to the Round of 16. Harkes contributed to the Andrés Escobar own goal which arguably led to the Colombian defender's shooting death weeks later. Harkes delivered a cross from the left aimed at Earnie Stewart, which Escobar attempted to clear, but instead sent the ball past his goalkeeper.

However, Harkes missed the Round of 16 match against Brazil after receiving his second yellow card of the group stage against Romania, earning a one-match suspension. Brazil won the match 1–0 and went on to win the World Cup.

In Copa América 1995, Harkes led the United States, a guest team at the tournament, to a 3–0 upset of defending champion Argentina and a semi-final finish. He was named co-Most Valuable Player of the tournament, along with Uruguayan Enzo Francescoli.

=== 1998 World Cup controversy ===
In 1996, before the beginning of the qualifying for the 1998 World Cup, head coach Steve Sampson named Harkes "Captain For Life", which meant Harkes would be the captain of the national team as long as he wished and Sampson was the coach. He responded by leading the team in assists in qualifying and helped the United States qualify for a third straight World Cup finals appearance.

However, Sampson controversially left Harkes off the World Cup squad, citing "leadership issues", although the decision was never fully explained at the time. The bitterness resulting from the omission and the irony of the "Captain for Life" title would serve as the inspiration for his autobiography, Captain for Life: And Other Temporary Assignments (ISBN 1-886947-49-X), co-written with Denise Kiernan and published in 1999. In the book, Harkes criticized Sampson for lacking "credibility to a group of guys who had hundreds and hundreds of caps among them" and "putting a huge amount of pressure on young, internationally inexperienced players", and concluded, "I can't think of one thing that Steve did right in the months leading up to the World Cup". The 1998 team lost all three games in the group stage, finishing last overall.

In February 2010 Sampson and former teammate Eric Wynalda revealed that an alleged affair between Harkes and Wynalda's wife, Amy, had prompted Harkes' sudden dismissal. Sampson confirmed Wynalda's claim in a 2016 podcast interview with Alexi Lalas.

Harkes was called up to the national team again by his former college coach, Bruce Arena in 1999, and helped the United States win the bronze medal in the Confederations Cup that year. He ended his international career in 2000 with 90 appearances.

== Coaching career ==
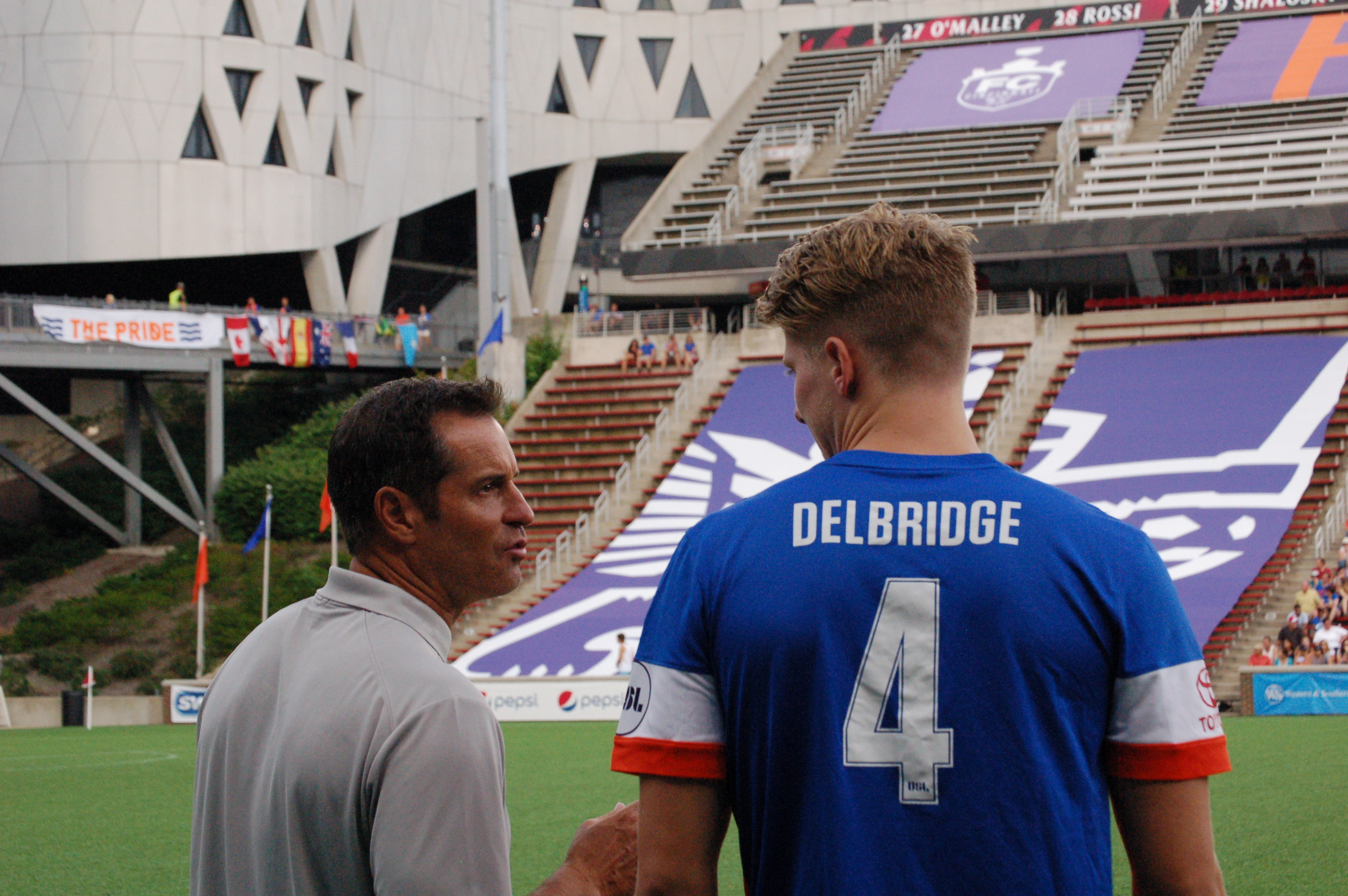
Harkes with defender Harrison Delbridge during a 2016 FC Cincinnati match

In August 2015, the formation of FC Cincinnati, a new franchise in the then-third-division United Soccer League, was announced, with Harkes as the team's first head coach. In FC Cincinnati's first season under Harkes, the club finished third in the USL Eastern Conference with a 12–6–4 record. However, on February 17, 2017, FC Cincinnati announced the firing of Harkes ahead of the 2017 season. From outside the club, the dismissal was seen as a surprise; reports later emerged of a 2016–17 offseason that was "unstructured and somewhat chaotic behind the scenes", according to The Cincinnati Enquirer's Pat Brennan.

In August 2018, Harkes was named as the first head coach of Greenville Triumph, a new club set to join USL League One in 2019. Harkes was signed to a three-year contract to lead the entire technical side of the organization. In the team's first season, they finished third in the standings and were the runner-up in the playoffs. In the 2020 season, the Triumph finished first in the standings and won the playoffs, and Harkes was named the USL League One Coach of the Year. On January 26, 2021, the Triumph extended Harkes's contract through the 2023 season. The Triumph finished second in the standings in both the 2021 and 2022 seasons.

== Off the field ==
In 2010, Eric Wynalda stated that former U.S. national team head coach Steve Sampson had dropped Harkes from the 1998 World Cup team two months prior to the tournament because Harkes had been having relations with teammate Wynalda's wife, Amy, in the couple's house, and near the playpen of their young child. Sampson became aware of the scandal and brewing feud between Wynalda and Harkes, and chose to drop Harkes to restore dressing room accord. Despite intense criticism from the media and subsequent failure in the World Cup, Sampson remained silent regarding the true reason for Harkes' dismissal from the team out of respect for the privacy of those involved. Harkes himself published an autobiography in 1999 panning Sampson's tenure as coach, but made no mention of the affair.

=== Personal life ===
Both of Harkes' parents are Scottish immigrants; his father Jim is originally from Dundee, and was a youth team player at Dundee United.

He is the father of Lauren Harkes, who played collegiately at Clemson University, and Ian Harkes, who won the Hermann Trophy in 2016, played for John's old team, D.C. United, Dundee United in Scotland, and for the New England Revolution, where John played from 1999 to 2001. His wife, Cindy, was an NCAA Academic All-American at the University of Virginia and played professionally in England with Sheffield Wednesday and the Stanton Rangers.

== Career statistics ==
=== International ===
John Harkes in international competitions
Date	Venue	Opponent	Score	Result	Competition
August 13, 1989	Los Angeles, California	South Korea	1–2	1–2	Friendly
February 24, 1990	Palo Alto, California	Soviet Union	1–0	1–3	Friendly
May 30, 1992	Washington, D.C.	Republic of Ireland	3–1	3–1	1992 U.S. Cup
May 6, 1992	Chicago, Illinois	Italy	1–1	1–1	1992 U.S. Cup
June 11, 1995	Boston, Massachusetts	Nigeria	1–1	3–2	1995 U.S. Cup
June 18, 1995	Washington, D.C.	Mexico	3–0	4–0	1995 U.S. Cup

== Honors ==
=== As a player ===
Sheffield Wednesday

- Football League Cup: 1990–91; runner-up: 1992–93
- FA Cup runner-up: 1992–93

Individual

- MLS All-Star: 1997, 1998, 1999, 2000

=== As a coach ===
Greenville Triumph

- USL League One: 2020
