= Marcelo Balboa =

American soccer player (born 1967)

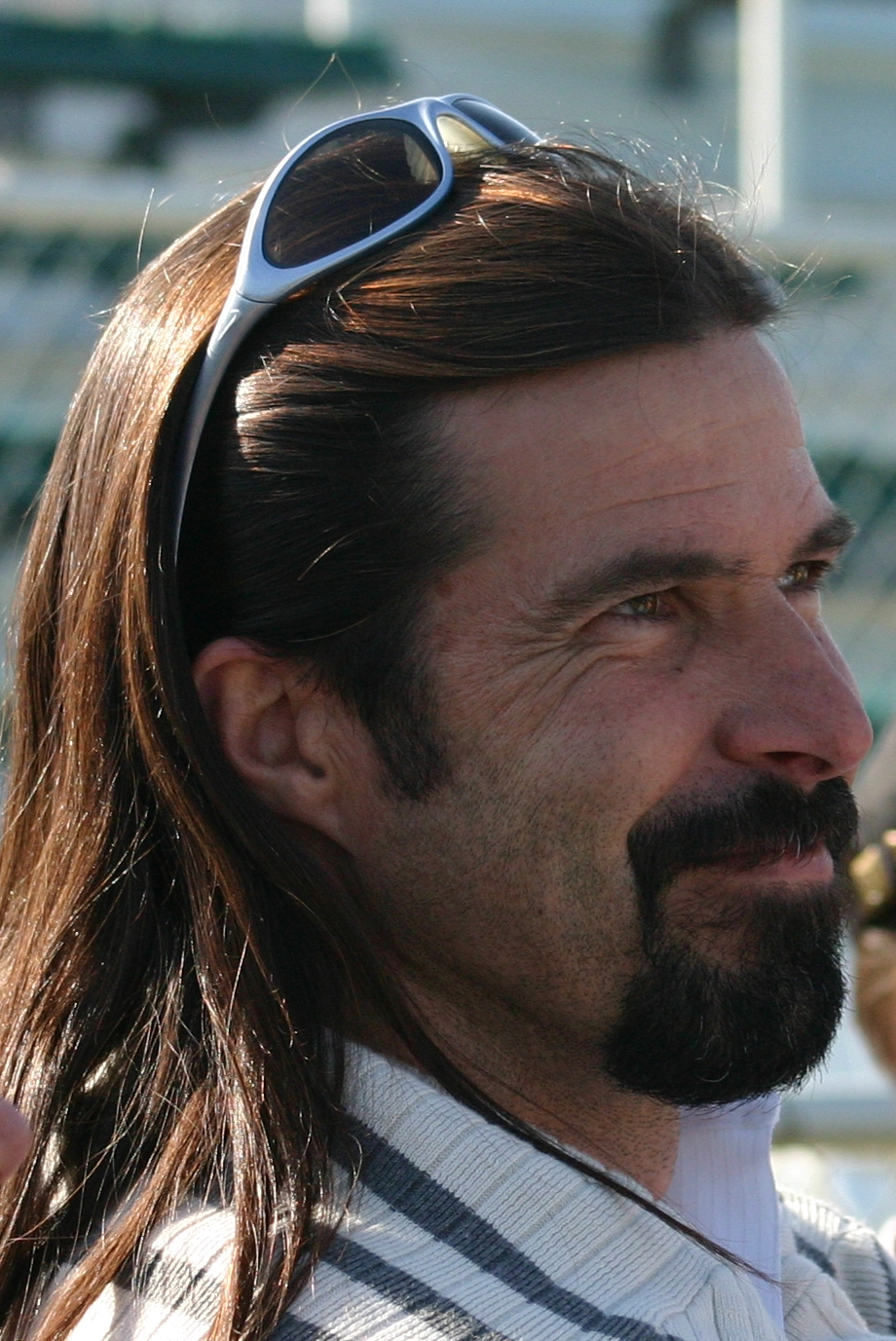
- Balboa in 2006

Personal information
- Date of birth: August 8, 1967 (age 59)
- Place of birth: Chicago, Illinois, U.S.
- Height: 6 ft 1 in (1.85 m)
- Position: Defender

College career
Years	Team	Apps	(Gls)
1986–1987	Cerritos Falcons		
1988–1989	San Diego State Aztecs		

Senior career*
Years	Team	Apps	(Gls)
1987–1989	San Diego Nomads		(8)
1990–1991	San Francisco Bay	15	(7)
1992	Colorado Foxes	15	(4)
1994–1995	León	53	(3)
1996–2001	Colorado Rapids	151	(24)
2002	MetroStars	1	(0)
Total		235	(46)

International career
1988–2000	United States	127	(13)
Medal record
Representing United States
Men's soccer
FIFA Confederations Cup
Third place	1992 Saudi Arabia
Third place	1999 Mexico
CONCACAF Gold Cup
Winner	1991 United States
Third place	1996 United States
Runner-up	1998 United States
- * Club domestic league appearances and goals

Marcelo Balboa (born August 8, 1967) is an American former professional soccer player who played as a defender in the 1990s for the United States national team, becoming its captain. He is a member of the National Soccer Hall of Fame.

After retiring from playing, he has worked as a commentator for ESPN and ABC and MLS games on HDNet and Altitude, as well as FIFA World Cup games on Univision. He is the head boys' soccer coach for Monarch High School in Louisville, Colorado,

== Club career ==
=== Youth ===
Balboa, who is of Argentine descent, was born in Chicago, Illinois, and grew up in Cerritos, California. Balboa played youth soccer for Fram-Culver, which won the 1986 McGuire Cup (U-19 National Championship). Balboa's father, Luis Balboa who played professionally in Argentina and with the Chicago Mustangs of the North American Soccer League, coached him. In 1985, Balboa graduated from Cerritos High School.

Balboa attended Cerritos College, a local two-year community college from 1986 to 1987. At Cerritos, Balboa was both placekicker on the football team and a two-time 1st Team All-South Coast Conference soccer player. Cerritos College has retired Balboa's jersey number – #3. In 1988, Balboa transferred to San Diego State University where he was a 1988 First Team and a 1989 Second Team All American soccer player.

=== Professional ===
From 1987 to 1989, Balboa played the collegiate off-seasons on an amateur contract with the professional San Diego Nomads of the Western Soccer League. He was the 1988 WSA MVP. In 1990, Balboa began his professional career with the San Francisco Bay Blackhawks of the American Professional Soccer League. In 1992, he moved to the Colorado Foxes. He played for León in the Mexican League in 1995 and 1996.

In 1996, Balboa signed with Major League Soccer and the Colorado Rapids. Balboa played six seasons for the Rapids, leading as the team's all-time leader in many statistical categories. Traded to the MetroStars in 2002, he played only five minutes all year, sitting out the rest with injuries, and retiring afterwards.

Balboa ended his MLS career with 24 goals and 23 assists in 152 games. In 2005, Balboa was named to the MLS All-Time Best XI and elected to the National Soccer Hall of Fame on the first ballot along with Nick Folan. In 2012, he was inducted into the Colorado Hall of Fame.

A goal by Balboa for the Rapids in 2000 against the Columbus Crew was named the MLS Goal of the Year for that season.

== International career ==
Balboa earned his first cap with United States national team on January 10, 1988, against Guatemala. He anchored the American defense in the 1990 and the 1994 FIFA World Cups, in the latter receiving international attention for his near miss with a bicycle kick in the United States' win over Colombia. He was named U.S. Soccer Athlete of the Year in 1992 and 1994. In 1995, he became the first United States player to break the 100-cap barrier. In 1998, he joined Tab Ramos and Eric Wynalda as the first United States players to play in three World Cups. Balboa ended his United States career with 128 caps and 13 goals, and his final appearance came in a friendly against Iran on January 16, 2000.

== Post-retirement ==
=== Team executive ===
After the 2004 MLS season, Balboa assumed a front office position with the Rapids.

=== Broadcaster ===
Balboa debuted as a sideline reporter during ABC's coverage of the 2003 MLS All-Star Game and MLS Cup. In 2004, he became a regular announcer for ABC and ESPN's television coverage of the United States national team. Most recently, Balboa has paired up with baseball announcer Dave O'Brien as networks' #1 U.S. announcing team for the 2006 FIFA World Cup.

In 2007, Balboa started a soccer radio show, From The Pitch, which airs on Denver station Mile High Sports Radio. Balboa served as an analyst for NBC Sports coverage of Soccer at the 2008 Summer Olympics. He has been a guest soccer analyst on Telefutura's Contacto Deportivo.

Balboa spent 15 seasons covering Colorado Rapids matches for Altitude TV, until 2022 when MLS rights went to Apple TV. In 2023, he joined Apple TV as MLS analyst.

In 2014, he was commentator of the United States team matches for Univision at the World Cup in Brazil.

In 2026, Balboa joined CBS as a studio analyst for the 2026 FIFA World Cup.

=== Coaching ===
In 2012, Monarch High School hired Balboa to coach the boys' soccer team.

Since 2016, Balboa has coached the Colorado Rapids U-14 Academy team.

== Personal life ==
Balboa, who is the son of Argentine immigrants, resides in the town of Superior, Colorado.

== Career statistics ==
=== International ===
Appearances and goals by national team and year
National team	Year	Apps	Goals
United States	1988	7	0
United States	1989	4	0
United States	1990	15	1
United States	1991	15	2
United States	1992	21	3
United States	1993	10	0
United States	1994	24	4
United States	1995	6	1
United States	1996	8	1
United States	1997	10	0
United States	1998	4	1
United States	1999	2	0
United States	2000	1	0
Total		127	13

Scores and results list the United States' goal tally first, score column indicates score after each Balboa goal.

List of international goals scored by Marcelo Balboa
No.	Date	Venue	Opponent	Score	Result	Competition
1	May 30, 1990	Sportpark Eschen-Mauren, Eschen, Liechtenstein	Liechtenstein	2–1	4–1	Friendly
2	June 29, 1991	Rose Bowl, Pasadena, United States	Trinidad and Tobago	2–1	2–1	1991 CONCACAF Gold Cup
3	August 28, 1991	Stadionul Municipal, Brașov, Romania	Romania	1–0	2–0	Friendly
4	February 2, 1992	Pontiac Silverdome, Pontiac, United States	CIS	1–0	2–0	Friendly
5	May 30, 1992	Robert F. Kennedy Memorial Stadium, Washington, D.C., United States	Republic of Ireland	2–1	3–1	1992 U.S. Cup
6	October 19, 1992	King Fahd International Stadium, Riyadh, Saudi Arabia	Ivory Coast	1–0	5–2	1992 King Fahd Cup
7	January 15, 1994	Sun Devil Stadium, Tempe, United States	Norway	1–1	2–1	Friendly
8	February 13, 1994	Hong Kong Stadium, So Kon Po, Hong Kong	Romania	1–1	1–2	1994 Carlsberg Cup
9	March 12, 1994	Titan Stadium, Fullerton, United States	South Korea	1–1	1–1	Friendly
10	May 7, 1994	Titan Stadium, Fullerton, United States	Estonia	3–0	4–0	Friendly
11	June 11, 1995	Foxboro Stadium, Foxborough, United States	Nigeria	2–2	3–2	1995 U.S. Cup
12	January 16, 1996	Anaheim Stadium, Anaheim, United States	Trinidad and Tobago	2–0	2–0	1996 CONCACAF Gold Cup
13	March 14, 1998	Qualcomm Stadium San Diego, United States	Paraguay	2–1	2–2	Friendly

== Honors ==
United States

- CONCACAF Gold Cup: 1991

Individual

- U.S. Soccer Athlete of the Year: 1992, 1994
- MLS All-Star: 1997, 1998, 1999, 2000
- MLS Goal of the Year Award: 2000
- CONCACAF Team of the Century: 1998
- MLS 10th Anniversary Team

== See also ==
- List of men's footballers with 100 or more international caps
