= Tab Ramos =

Former footballer and coach (born 1966)

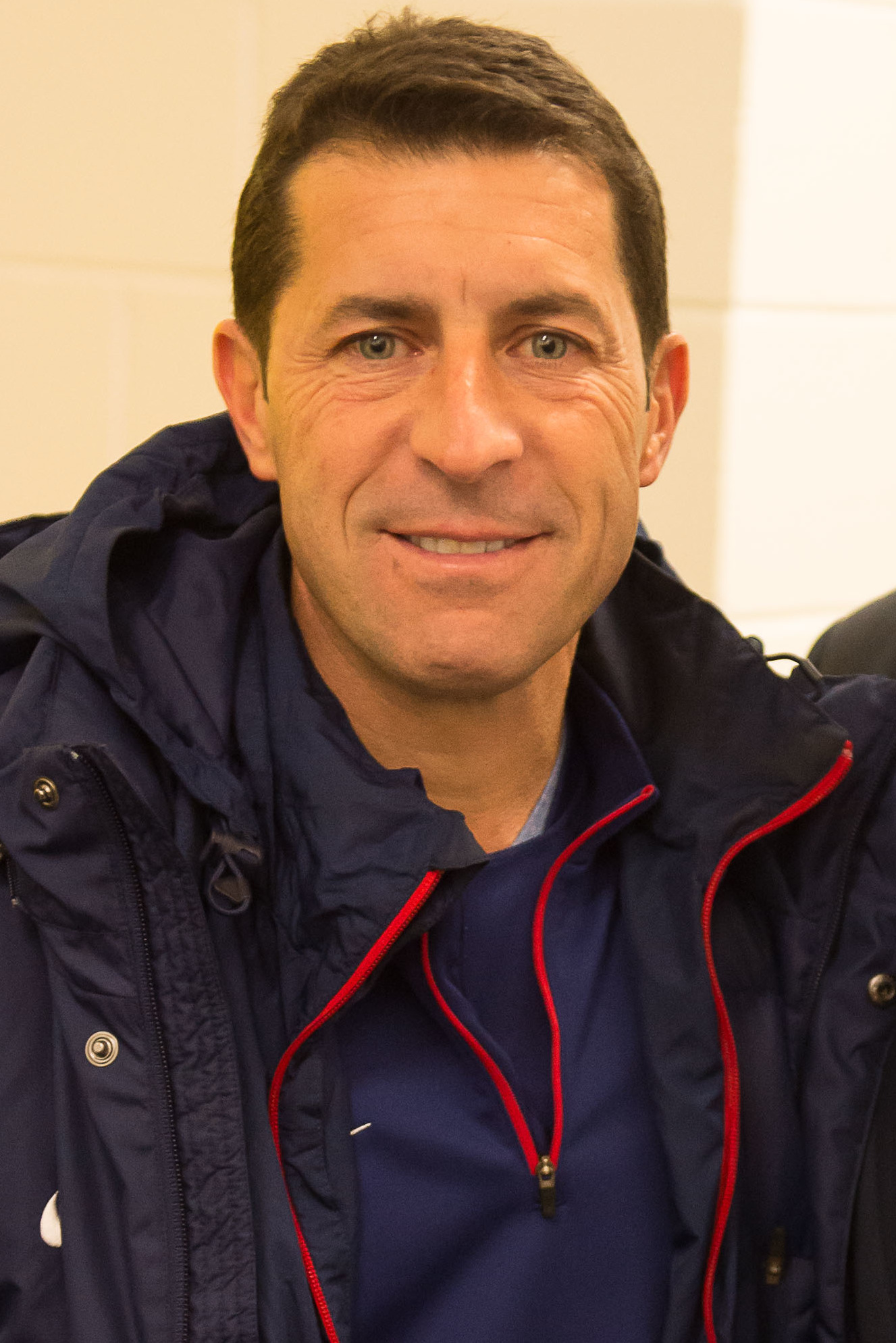
- Ramos in 2015

Personal information
- Full name: Tabaré Ramos Ricciardi
- Date of birth: September 21, 1966 (age 60)
- Place of birth: Montevideo, Uruguay
- Height: 5 ft 7 in (1.70 m)
- Position: Midfielder

College career
Years	Team	Apps	(Gls)
1984–1987	NC State Wolfpack		

Senior career*
Years	Team	Apps	(Gls)
1988	New Jersey Eagles	8	(2)
1989	Miami Sharks	3	(0)
1990–1991	→ Figueres (loan)	38	(5)
1991–1992	Figueres	34	(4)
1992–1995	Real Betis	32	(1)
1995–2002	MetroStars	121	(8)
1995–1996	→ Tigres UANL (loan)	35	(2)
Total		271	(22)

International career
1988–2000	United States	81	(8)

Managerial career
- 2009–2011: United States U20 (assistant)
- 2011–2019: United States U20
- 2014–2016: United States (assistant)
- 2019–2021: Houston Dynamo
- 2022–2023: Hartford Athletic
- 2023: New England Revolution (assistant)
Medal record
Representing United States (as head coach)
CONCACAF U-20 Championship
First place	2018 USA
First place	2017 Costa Rica
Third place	2015 Jamaica
Second place	2013 Mexico
Representing United States (as player)
CONCACAF Championship / Gold Cup
Second place	1989
Second place	1993
Second place	1998
Third place	1996
- * Club domestic league appearances and goals

Tabaré "Tab" Ramos Ricciardi (born September 21, 1966) is a soccer coach and former professional player who played as a midfielder. Born in Uruguay, he played for the United States national team.

Over his thirteen-year professional career, Ramos played in Spain, Mexico, and the United States. The first player to sign with Major League Soccer, he spent the last seven years of his career with the MetroStars (now the New York Red Bulls). He featured in three World Cups and was elected to the National Soccer Hall of Fame in 2005.

== Early career ==
=== Youth and school ===
Born in Uruguay, Ramos immigrated to the United States with his family when he was 11. His father played professional soccer in Uruguay with CA River Plate and instilled a love for the game into Tab from an early age. While living in Uruguay, he played for the Union Vecinal Youth Soccer Club in Montevideo.

When his family arrived in the U.S., they settled in New Jersey where Ramos lived in Harrison and Kearny. He attended Saint Benedict's Preparatory School, the same high school attended by Claudio Reyna a few years later. In 1982, he became U.S. citizen. He also played for local youth club Thistle FC where he played with future United States captain John Harkes. Ramos and Harkes played together from their youth through the U.S. National Team. They were both inducted into the Hall of Fame in 2005.

Ramos was a two-time high school All-America and the 1983 Parade Magazine National High School Player of the Year. That year he led St. Benedict's to the New Jersey State Championship. Ramos still holds the New Jersey High School boys' soccer career scoring record of 161 goals, 57 of which he scored in his senior year. In 1999, he was named by The Star-Ledger as one of the top ten New Jersey high school soccer players of the 1980s.

Apart from playing soccer, Ramos also ran indoor track at St. Benedict's (60 yards and 4 × 100 m relay).

In 1984 the New York Cosmos of the North American Soccer League drafted Ramos with the 10th pick of the first round but he chose to go to college instead. The NASL folded about six months later.

=== College ===
Ramos attended college at NC State where he played NCAA soccer for four years. He was All ACC his four years and a three time All-American. He was tied with Bruce Murray for the Atlantic Coast Conference scoring title his senior year. In 1988, he left school briefly to play for the U.S. team at the 1988 Summer Olympics. However, he returned in 1989 to leave again when he signed with the United States men's national soccer team. He finally graduated in 2001 with a Bachelor of Arts in Foreign Language (Spanish) and Literature after taking years of correspondence courses.

== Professional career ==
=== American Soccer League / MISL ===
Ramos played with the New Jersey Eagles of the American Soccer League in 1988. That same year the Tacoma Stars of the MISL selected him with the #1 pick in the draft. He did not play a game as he decided to only play the outdoor game. He then moved to the Miami Sharks for the 1989 season. He was selected as a league All Star that year.

=== Spain ===
Ramos and several other national team players signed contracts with the United States Soccer Federation (USSF) to play exclusively for the national team as it prepared for the 1990 FIFA World Cup. Following the World Cup, USSF began seeking club opportunities for the national team players. On July 27, 1990, USSF agreed to loan Ramos to Spanish Second Division club Figueres for the 1990–1991 season. He played with Tito Vilanova who would later become FC Barcelona's manager. In his first season with the team he played 38 games, scoring 5 goals. On June 23, 1991, Figueres purchased Ramos' contract from USSF for $250,000. His excellent play continued during his second year with the Figueres, bringing considerable attention from several Primera División clubs. However, Ramos sabotaged this interest when he was ejected from a November 24, 1991 game with Rayo Vallecano. He was suspended for three games and interest in him dried up until the end of the season. On July 31, 1992, Figueres sold Ramos to fellow Second Division club Real Betis for $400,000. In the 1993–1994 season Real Betis won Segunda División and earned promotion to La Liga. While Ramos remained with Betis for the 1994–1995 season, he never played a game in La Liga as he was recovering from a skull fracture suffered during the 1994 FIFA World Cup game with Brazil (see Senior national team section).

In 1994, Ramos was chosen as the CONCACAF Player of the Year.

=== Mexico ===
On January 3, 1995, Ramos became the first player to sign with Major League Soccer (MLS). The league had intended to begin play in the fall of 1995 but difficulties forced it to delay its start for a year. Rather than letting players such as Ramos sit idle, the league loaned him and several others to foreign teams. MLS sent Ramos to the Liga MX side México Primera División Tigres for the second half of the 1994–1995 season. Ramos became the first American player to appear for the side, seeing time in twelve games. He remained on loan with Tigres for the 1995–96 season, playing twenty-three games and scoring two goals as the team ran to the 1996 Mexico Cup championship, one of two Mexico Cups won by Tigres and its first title in 20 years.

=== MetroStars ===
While Ramos was in Mexico, MLS allocated him to the future New York/New Jersey franchise, eventually known as the MetroStars.

Following the end of the Mexican season in April 1996, Ramos returned to the United States for the inaugural MLS season in 1996. He would play seven seasons for the MetroStars, earning All Star recognition in 1996, 1998 and 1999. On May 14, 2002, he announced his intentions of retiring at the end of the 2002 season. When he retired, he was the last original member of the team. Ramos totaled just eight goals and 36 assists in MLS play (ten goals and 39 assists in all competitions).

== U.S. national teams ==
=== 1983 FIFA U-20 World Cup ===
Ramos began his national team career playing at the U-20 level in 1982, just after gaining his U.S. citizenship. Ramos was 15 when he scored two goals in the regional qualifying for the 1983 FIFA U-20 World Cup. However, the U.S. went 0–2–1 and failed to advance out of group play in the championship tournament.

=== Cut from 1984 Olympic team ===
Ramos represented the U.S. at the 1983 Pan American Games. In 1984, Ramos was the last player cut from the U.S. 1984 Summer Olympics soccer team. At 17 years old, he had just left high school, but was already known as an up-and-coming player. However, the International Olympic Committee had opened the Olympic soccer tournament to professionals for the 1984 games. The U.S., as the host nation, did not need to qualify, but had assembled a team of amateurs, mostly college players. When the IOC announced their decision, USSF dumped most of the original team, except for Paul Caligiuri, for professionals.

Ramos had further disappointment a year later when the U.S. failed to qualify for the 1985 FIFA U-20 World Cup, despite a 3–2–2 record in the qualifying tournament. He went on, however, to play for the U.S. team which went 0–1–2 at the 1988 Summer Olympics in Seoul, South Korea.

=== Senior national team ===
It would be another year before Ramos earned his first cap for the senior U.S. team, on January 10, 1988, against Guatemala. He soon became an integral part of national team.

After playing for the United States in the 1990 FIFA World Cup, he was named U.S. Soccer Athlete of the Year in 1990.

In 1994 Ramos once again played in the World Cup, being a starting player for the U.S. National Team in all its matches. In the round of 16 Ramos suffered a skull fracture, caused by an elbow to the head by Brazilian leftback Leonardo in the first half of the game, which resulted in a straight red for Leonardo. United States were eliminated as Bebeto scored Brazil's winning goal. Tab Ramos was in the hospital for a few weeks where he was visited by Leonardo.

Ramos saw more success in 1995 as a member of the U.S. team when it placed fourth at the Copa América.

On September 7, 1997, Ramos scored against Costa Rica in a 1–0 World Cup qualifier win. In 1998, he played in his third World Cup. Ramos made his last national team appearance on November 15, 2000, in a 4–0 U.S. win against Barbados. Two days later he announced his retirement from the national team. He finished his national team career with 81 caps and eight goals.

Ramos also played 8 games, scoring 3 goals, for the U.S. Futsal team which finished 3rd at the 1989 FIFA Futsal World Championship.

=== International goals ===
#	Date	Venue	Opponent	Score	Result	Competition
1	April 30, 1989	St. Louis, Missouri	Costa Rica	1–0	1–0	1990 FIFA World Cup Qualifying
2	June 4, 1989	East Rutherford, New Jersey	Peru	2–0	3–0	Friendly
3	May 30, 1992	Washington, D.C.	Republic of Ireland	1–1	3–1	Friendly
4	Oct. 8, 1995	Washington, D.C.	Saudi Arabia	3–3	4–3	Friendly
5	June 9, 1996	Foxborough, Massachusetts	Republic of Ireland	1–1	2–1	Friendly
6	Sept. 7, 1997	Portland, Oregon	Costa Rica	1–0	1–0	1998 FIFA World Cup Qualifying
7	May 24, 1998	Portland, Oregon	Kuwait	2–0	2–0	Friendly
8	Aug. 16, 2000	Foxborough, Massachusetts	Barbados	6–0	7–0	2002 FIFA World Cup Qualifying

== Coaching career ==
=== NJSA 04 ===
In 2004, with the help of partners, Ramos founded a soccer club based out of Aberdeen, New Jersey. NJSA 04 later morphed into Cedar Stars Monmouth and is currently one of four clubs in New Jersey to participate in the MLS Next League.

=== United States U-20 national team ===
Ramos is one of the most accomplished figures in U.S. Soccer history qualifying for the fourth World Cup as U-20 MNT head coach in 2019. He led the under-20 age group team to the final of the 2013 CONCACAF U-20 Championship where they lost to Mexico. The team qualified for the 2013 FIFA U-20 World Cup, however they failed to make it out of the group stage, finishing bottom with 1 point.

In November 2013, he signed a contract to remain in the position. He won the 2017 CONCACAF U-20 Championship with the United States, with assistant coaches Omid Namazi and Brad Friedel. In 2019 Ramos qualified the team to the third straight FIFA U-20 World Cup quarterfinal. In 2015 after a scoreless draw through 120 minutes Serbia eliminated the team in quarterfinals on penalties. Ultimately Serbia won the championship beating Brazil 2–1 in the final of the FIFA Under-20 World Cup in Auckland

=== United States men's national soccer team ===
On March 31, 2014, Ramos was appointed to the assistant coach position of the United States men's national soccer team by head coach Jürgen Klinsmann, less than three months before the 2014 World Cup, replacing Martín Vásquez.

=== Houston Dynamo ===
On October 25, 2019, Ramos was named head coach of Major League Soccer club Houston Dynamo.

=== Hartford Athletic ===
Ramos was named head coach of USL Championship club Hartford Athletic on August 22, 2022.

== Coaching statistics ==
As of match played November 4, 2021

Coaching record by team and tenure
Team	Nat	From	To	Record							
Team	Nat	From	To	G	W	D	L	GF	GA	GD	Win %
Houston Dynamo	(United States)	January 1, 2020	November 4, 2021	57	10	21	26	66	94	−28	17.54

== Personal life ==
Ramos lives in Colts Neck, New Jersey, with his girlfriend Tracey and three children, Alex, Kristen, and Sarah.

== Honors ==
Individual

- U.S. Soccer Athlete of the Year: 1990
- MLS All-Star: 1996, 1998
- CONCACAF Team of the Century: 1998
