= 1988 Fort Lauderdale Strikers season =

Fort Lauderdale Strikers
1988 season
- Owner(s): (United States) Joe Robbie; Noel Lemon
- Manager: Wim Suurbier
- Stadium: Lockhart Stadium
- ASL Southern Division: Champion
- ASL Championship: Runner-up
Home colors	Away colors

The 1988 Fort Lauderdale Strikers season was the first season of the new team in the new American Soccer League. It was the first outdoor team to be fielded by the club in a professional league in four years, since the original North American Soccer League. It was the club's twenty-second season in professional soccer. This also marked the return of the Fort Lauderale Striker's name after moving the club back from Minnesota to Florida. Previously, the club had been represented as the Minnesota Strikers. During their inaugural year in the ASL, the team won the Southern Division and made it through the playoffs and into the ASL Championship. They were this year's Runner's-up.

== Competitions ==
=== ASL regular season ===
==== Northern Division ====
Place	Team	GP	W	L	GF	GA	Points
1	New Jersey Eagles	20	15	5	39	24	45
2	Maryland Bays	20	12	8	32	31	36
3	Washington Stars	20	11	9	31	28	33
4	Boston Bolts	20	9	11	31	33	27
5	Albany Capitals	20	7	13	26	35	21

==== Southern Division ====
Place	Team	GP	W	L	GF	GA	Points
1	Fort Lauderdale Strikers	20	14	6	46	25	42
2	Washington Diplomats	20	10	10	27	30	30
3	Tampa Bay Rowdies	20	10	10	23	21	30
4	Orlando Lions	20	8	12	21	31	24
5	Miami Sharks	20	4	16	24	42	12

=== ASL Playoffs ===
==== Bracket ====
Semifinals; Best-of-3
1	New Jersey Eagles	1	1	1
4	Washington Diplomats	4	0	4
2	Fort Lauderdale Strikers	5	6	-
3	Maryland Bays	2	0	-

ASL Championship; Best-of-3
4	Washington Diplomats	4	3	-
2	Fort Lauderdale Strikers	3	2	-

==== Match reports ====
===== Semifinal 1 =====
August 13, 1988
3:00 PM EST

Maryland Bays (MD)	2–5	Fort Lauderdale Strikers (FL)
Vernon Skinner (yellow card) 28'; Sylvanus Oriaikhi 44'; Kurt Dasbach 80'	report	17' Ray Hudson; 65', 75', 85' Steve Kinsey; 85' Ricardo Alonso

Byrd Stadium, Columbia, Maryland
Attendance: 1,808

August 14, 1988
8:00 PM EST

Fort Lauderdale Strikers (FL)	6–0	Maryland Bays (MD)
Steve Kinsey 5', 46', 88'; Ken Fogarty (yellow card) 13'; Miljce Donev 44'; Ray Hudson 64'; Marcelo Carrera 69'	report	(yellow card) 90' Sylvanus Oriaikhi

Lockhart Stadium, Fort Lauderdale, Florida
Attendance: 1,406

===== Semifinal 2 =====
August 13, 1988
8:00 PM EST

Washington Diplomats (DC)	4–1	New Jersey Eagles (NJ)
Duncan Reynard 13'; Jean Harbor 18', 65'; Leonel Suazo 84'		78' Mario Chavez

RFK Stadium, Washington, D.C.
Attendance: 2,346

August 14, 1988
5:00 PM EST

New Jersey Eagles (NJ)	1–0	Washington Diplomats (DC)
Ken Lolla 64'

Hinchliffe Stadium, Paterson, New Jersey
Attendance: 1,531

August 14, 1988

New Jersey Eagles (NJ)	1–4	Washington Diplomats (DC)
Mario Chavez 2'		11' Jean Harbor; 13', 26' Marco Casas-Cordero; 20' Fernando Iturbe

Hinchliffe Stadium, Paterson, New Jersey
Attendance: 1,531

===== Final =====
August 21, 1988
8:00 PM EST

Washington Diplomats (DC)	4–3	Fort Lauderdale Strikers (FL)
Michael Brady 17:26', 21:43'; Joaquin Canales 54:29' (Harbor, Simmons); Ronald Simmons 89:30' (pen.)	report	Ricardo Alonso 56:50' (Carrera, Hudson); Mark Schwartz 57:11' (Hudson); Thomas Rongen 86:36'

RFK Stadium, Washington, D.C.
Attendance: 5,745

August 27, 1988
8:00 EST

Fort Lauderdale Strikers (FL)	2–3	Washington Diplomats (DC)
Ricardo Alonso 27:57'; Ricardo Alonso 33:20' (Carrera)	Report	Leonel Suazo 29:40' (Canales); Keith Trehy 30:50'; Michael Brady 35:30' (Hong)

Lockhart Stadium, Fort Lauderdale, Florida
Attendance: 4,257

=== 1988 ASL All-Star game ===
The ASL All-Star game was hosted by the Fort Lauderdale Strikers at Lockhart Stadium. Players that were unable to play due to injury, as well as any Strikers selected to the squad were replaced, since the All-Stars' opponent was the Strikers. George Best also suited up for the Strikers in the match. The match ended in a 3–3 draw after 90 minutes, and moved directly to a penalty shootout. Both teams converted four of five attempts, and in an unusual move agreed to end it there with the consent of the referees.

==== Match summary ====
June 16, 1988
7:30 PM EDT

Fort Lauderdale Strikers	3–3	ASL All-Stars
Miljce Donev 14:00' (Cubillas, Carrera); Ray Hudson 36:00' (Carrera); Marcelo Carrera 44:28' (Hudson)	Report 1 Report 2 Report 3	Dirceu Guimarães 53:00' (pen.); Dirceu Guimarães 57:10' (Alonso); Elvis Comrie 60:00' (Acosta, Canales)
Penalties
? (penalty scored) ? (penalty scored) ? (penalty missed) ? (penalty scored) ? (penalty scored)	4 – 4	(penalty missed) Steve Wegerle; (penalty scored) ? (penalty scored) Elvis Comrie; (penalty scored) ? (penalty scored) Dirceu Guimarães

Lockhart Stadium, Fort Lauderdale, Florida
Attendance: 3,179
Referee: Ed Bellion
