= 1971 Howard Bison men's soccer team =

American university NCAA team

1971 Howard Bison men's soccer

National Champions (vacated)

NCAA Tournament, W 3–2 vs. Saint Louis
- Record: 15–0–0 (10–0–0 in the regular season )
- Head coach: Lincoln "Tiger" Phillips (1st season)
- Home stadium: Howard Stadium

The 1971 Howard Bison men's soccer team represented Howard University in Washington, D.C. during the 1971 NCAA men's soccer season. The team finished the season undefeated and won the 1971 NCAA tournament, defeating the Saint Louis Billikens 3–2 in the final. However, following an anonymous tip, the NCAA investigated the team and ruled they had fielded ineligible players. In January 1973, the NCAA vacated the national championship and banned the Bison from the 1973 playoffs. The team protested the punishment, arguing that they had been targeted because of their success as a historically black university (HBCU). Although they were unable to get the 1971 championship reinstated, Howard went on to win the 1974 NCAA tournament and again beat Saint Louis in the final.

== Previous season ==
In 1970, the Bison finished with a 13–1–1 record and lost to Philadelphia Textile (now Thomas Jefferson University) in the quarterfinals of the 1970 NCAA tournament. The team was led by freshmen Alvin Henderson and Keith Aqui; they each scored 21 goals and were named NCAA All-Americans (Henderson to the first team, Aqui to the second). Both returned for the 1971 season. This was also the first year that Washington Darts player-manager Lincoln "Tiger" Phillips worked with the team. After the success of the 1970 season, Phillips was officially brought on as Howard's full-time head coach for the 1971 season.

== Squad ==
Phillips recruited international students, primarily from Africa and the Caribbean, to the Howard squad. Some were current students attending Howard with no knowledge that the school had a soccer program. Phillips, a Trinidadian, had represented Trinidad and Tobago at the 1967 Pan American Games. Because players from these regions were still under-recruited by European clubs, Phillips was able to bring in players who were among the best in their home countries.

After leading the team in scoring for the second consecutive year, Aqui and Henderson were both named NCAA First-Team All-Americans in 1971.

Note: Flags indicate national team as defined under FIFA eligibility rules; some limited exceptions apply. Players may hold more than one non-FIFA nationality.

| No. | Pos. | Nation | Player |
|---|---|---|---|
| 1 | | TTO | Keith Aqui |
| 2 | FW | GUI | Mori Diane |
| 3 | | GUY | Ronald Daly |
| 4 | | TTO | Winston Yallery-Arthur |
| 5 | | TTO | Earnest Skinner |
| 7 | | ETH | Zewdu Haplemariam |
| 8 | | NGR | Olusegun Onadeko |
| 9 | | TTO | Desmond Alfred |
| 10 | GK | GHA | Samuel Tetteh |
| 11 | | USA | M. Jones |

| No. | Pos. | Nation | Player |
|---|---|---|---|
| 12 | | USA | L. Miles |
| 14 | | TTO | Steve Waldron |
| 15 | | TTO | Ian Bain |
| 16 | | TTO | Anthony Martin |
| 17 | | TTO | Eddie Holder |
| 18 | MF | BER | Donny Simmons |
| 19 | | NGR | Charles Pyne |
| 20 | FW | TTO | Alvin Henderson |
| 22 | MF | BER | Stan Smith (captain) |
| 23 | | ETH | Amdemichael Selassie |

As of publication of 1972 yearbook.

== Season ==
The Bison were a dominant, high-intensity side and did not trail in any regular season match. Primarily facing all-white squads, the team was racially abused by opposing teams and coaches. The Bison finished the regular season undefeated with a 10–0–0 record.

=== NCAA playoffs ===
In the first round of the NCAA playoffs, the Bison defeated West Virginia 1–0 at home. In the next round, also at home, the Bison beat Navy 3–0, setting up a quarterfinal matchup with Penn State. Howard was leading 3–0 by halftime and easily won 8–0, led by a Keith Aqui hat-trick and two more goals from Alvin Henderson. Their semifinal opponent was Harvard, and a late Ian Bain goal sent Howard through 1–0.

Facing the Bison in the NCAA championship final were the Saint Louis Billikens, who had won the NCAA tournament the previous two years, and eight of the previous 12 years. The Billikens were the top seed in the tournament and favored to win. Saint Louis went up in the 18th minute, and the Bison equalized through Alvin Henderson three minutes later. The Billikens scored again in the first half, leading Phillips to substitute Keith Aqui—who had been sitting out with a fever—into the game. The Bison would equalize with a Mori Diane goal just before halftime and then score the go-ahead goal midway through the second half. When the game ended 3–2, the Bison became the first HBCU to win an NCAA Division I national championship.

=== NCAA investigation and punishment ===
On January 26, 1972, the NCAA received a letter from an anonymous source requesting the NCAA look into the eligibility of Howard's players. The investigation lasted throughout the year, as the NCAA interviewed players, coaches, and the football associations of both the United States and Trinidad and Tobago. Despite losing key players throughout the 1972 NCAA playoffs, the Bison still reached the semifinals, where they lost a rematch with Saint Louis in overtime. A few weeks later in January 1973, the NCAA officially announced that the Bison had violated three rules related to player eligibility: a rule related to academic eligibility for first-year students, a rule governing international students, and a rule limiting students to five years of eligibility from their first admission to any college. In particular, Keith Aqui drew attention as a 25-year-old collegiate athlete.

The first violation stemmed from the NCAA's "1.6 rule", which required incoming athletes to score highly enough on the SAT or ACT to predict a 1.6 GPA. Some of Howard's international players had been admitted with scores from other exams (such as the General Certificate of Education) that Howard believed were sufficient to meet this rule. Because of previous lobbying from Ivy League universities, the 1.6 Rule was repealed the same month as the NCAA announcement; however, the change did not go into effect until the 1974–1975 season. The second violation stemmed from an NCAA rule that limited schools from admitting older international players with athletic experience in their home countries. One Howard player admitted playing in the Port of Spain Football League for three years, but argued that the league was not professional and was more similar to "guys from the neighborhood playing ball". The application of this rule was later found to be unconstitutional, as it penalized international students for participating in amateur leagues that American students were able to play in. The final violated rule limited player eligibility after enrollment at academic institutions in their home countries. In Aqui's case, Howard argued that the relevant school, Mausica Teachers’ College on Trinidad, did not grant four-year degrees and thus should not count as a college for the purpose of this rule. Based on these violations, the NCAA vacated the 1971 national title and the 1970 semifinal appearance, and banned the Bison from the 1973 playoffs. According to the NCAA, the Bison were the first national champions in any collegiate sport to have their title vacated.

Howard immediately protested the punishment, arguing that the NCAA rules were ambiguous and that the team had been targeted because of its success in the largely white collegiate soccer world. Sports journalists have argued that many schools were in violation of these rules, and Howard felt that the enforcement was unequal. Coach Phillips accused the NCAA of "practicing racism", and said in a speech that, "It's pretty evident that a black school is not supposed to win." Howard president James E. Cheek released a statement saying, "We feel that it is simply because we are a black institution that the NCAA was requested to investigate." The school filed a lawsuit against the NCAA alleging discrimination; although they were able to get the rule governing international student eligibility overturned as a violation of the 14th Amendment, the title was not reinstated.

The punishment led the team to embrace the civil rights movement and the African diaspora. Mori Diane said that the team "stood knee-deep in the civil rights struggle", and the team adopted a motto based on a William Cullen Bryant quote: "Truth, crushed to Earth, shall rise again". In 1974, the Bison went 19–0–0 and outscored opposing teams 63–6 on their way to another NCAA tournament final appearance. The final, taking place at Busch Stadium in St. Louis, again matched them against the Saint Louis Billikens. They defeated Saint Louis 2–1 in four overtimes for their first recognized national title.

== Popular culture ==
In 2021, Common announced he would be producing a film about the team and head coach Lincoln "Tiger" Phillips titled Rising Above. A number of professional American soccer players, including Jozy Altidore and DaMarcus Beasley, are involved in financing and producing the film.
