= Zuazo =

Zuazo may refer to:

== People ==
- Alonso de Zuazo (1466–1539), Spanish lawyer and colonial judge, that was governor in New Spain and in Santo Domingo
- Hernán Siles Zuazo (1914–1996), Bolivian politician
- Koldo Zuazo (born 1956), Basque linguist
- Secundino Zuazo (1887–1971), Spanish architect and city planner

== Others ==
- Batería de Zuazo, a battery in San Fernando, Province of Cádiz, Andalusia, Spain
- Puente Zuazo, a bridge in San Fernando, Province of Cádiz, Andalusia, Spain

== See also ==
- Suazo (disambiguation)
- Zauzou (disambiguation)
- Zazou (disambiguation)
- Zuaza, a village and council in Aiara, Álava, Spain
