= Suazo =

Suazo may refer to:

== People ==
- Alicia Suazo (fl. 1992–2002), member of the Utah State Senate from 2001 to 2002
- Anita Louise Suazo (born 1937), Native American potter from Santa Clara Pueblo, New Mexico state
- Chloe Suazo (born 1991), American actress
- David Suazo (born 1979), retired Honduran footballer who played as a striker
- Humberto Suazo (born 1981), Chilean footballer who plays as a striker
- Jonathan Suazo (born 1989), Chilean footballer who plays as a full-back
- José Peña Suazo (born 1967), Latin singer focusing on the Latin subgenre merengue
- Juan Pablo Suazo Euceda (born 1972), Honduran author and agricultural engineer
- Juanita Suazo Dubray (born 1930), Native American potter from Taos Pueblo, New Mexico state
- Julio César Suazo (born 1978), retired Honduran footballer who played as a defender
- Leonel Suazo (fl. 1982–1994), retired Honduran footballer who played as a forward
- Lucy Suazo (born 1981), Dominican female volleyball player
- Maynor Suazo (born 1979), Honduran footballer who plays as an attacking midfielder
- Milton Palacios Suazo (born 1980), retired Honduran footballer who played as a centre-back
- Nicolás Suazo (born 1965), retired Honduran footballer who played as a forward
- Pete Suazo (died 2001), the first Hispanic Utah State Senator
- Roberto Suazo Córdova (1927-2018), former President of Honduras

== Others ==
- Estadio Roberto Suazo Cordoba, multi-use stadium in La Paz, Honduras

== See also ==
- Zuazo (disambiguation)
