= 2021 Howard Bison men's soccer team =

American college soccer season

2021 Howard Bison men's soccer
- Conference: Northeast Conference
- Record: 3-10-3 (2-6-1 Northeast Conference)
- Head coach: Phillip Gyau (7th season)
- Assistant coach: Emile Ebouh (3rd season)
- Home stadium: Greene Stadium

The 2021 Howard Bison men's soccer team represented Howard University during the 2021 NCAA Division I men's soccer season. They were led by seventh year head coach Phillip Gyau.

== Roster ==
The 2021-2022 roster for the Howard Men's Bison. Note: Flags indicate national team as defined under FIFA eligibility rules; some limited exceptions apply. Players may hold more than one non-FIFA nationality.

No.	Pos.	Nation	Player
00	GK	USA	Albert Mercer
1	GK	USA	Emery Simon (Captain)
2	DF	USA	James Johnson
3	DF	USA	Roy Henderson
4	DF	USA	Jherson Machado
5	DF	USA	Brian Ballard
6	MF	USA	Alex Taylor
7	DF	USA	Vincent Turk (Captain)
8	MF	CAN	Ethan Persad
19	FW	NIG	Oluwaseun Oladeji
10	MF	USA	Malik Saleh
11	FW	USA	Ronald Little
12	MF	USA	Ashri Settles
13	FW	USA	Jackson Lewis
14	MF	USA	Manny Small

No.	Pos.	Nation	Player
15	FW	USA	Nathan Legget
16	DF	GHA	Kwadwo Nyarko
17	MF	USA	Tighe Yursha
18	DF	USA	Rameses Gaines
19	FW	USA	Miles Sims
20	FW	USA	Duncan Dunkwu
21	DF	USA	Rudy Acree
22	FW	USA	Bryson Baker
23	DF	USA	Robert Davis
24	MF	USA	Amir Acree
25	MF	KSA	Abdullah Al-Jirafi
26	DF	USA	Shaquille Salandy
27	DF	USA	Christian Bernard
30	MF	USA	Peter Gansallo
31	GK	USA	Ryan Nejadian
99	GK	SUI	Benjamin Hoesli

== Players arriving ==
Howard signed seven players during the 2021 recruiting period.

Name	Nat.	Hometown	Club	TDS Rating
Amir Acree MF	USA	Washington, DC	DC United (Academy)	2/5 stars
Bryson Baker FW	USA	Ellicot City, MD	SAC	2/5 stars
Rameses Gaines DF	USA	Oxon Hill, MD	DC United (Academy)	2/5 stars
Tighe Yursha MF	USA	Brandenton, FL	IMG Academy	1/5 stars
Christian Bernard FW	USA	Potomac, MD	Bethesda SC	2/5 stars
Julian Shorter DF	USA	Montclair, NJ	Cedar Stars Academy Monmouth	3/5 stars
Manny Small FW	USA	Palm Beach, FL	Wellington Wave SC	N/A

== Player statistics ==
No.	Player	Class	Goals	Assists	GS	GP
22	(United States) Bryson Baker	FR.	5	0	15	15
20	(United States) Duncan Dunkwu	SR.	4	5	14	15
9	(Niger) Oluwaseun Oladeji	SO.	4	0	2	9
24	(United States) Amir Acree	FR.	2	0	9	12
3	(United States) Roy Henderson	JR.	1	0	13	13
15	(United States) Nathan Leggett	FR.	1	0	2	13
17	(United States) Tighe Yursha	SO.	1	0	4	14
Totals			18	5	16	16

== Schedule ==
August

August 27 Non-conference	Howard University	3-3	Monmouth Hawks	West Long Branch, NJ
		Report		Stadium: Kessler Stadium

August 30 Non-conference	George Washington Colonials	1-1	Howard University	Washington, DC
	Bryson Baker	Report	Tim Neumann	Stadium: Greene Stadium

September

September 5 Non-conference	Howard University	1-2	Duquesne Dukes	Washington, DC
		Report		Stadium: Greene Stadium

September 11 Non-conference	Howard University	0-4	Marist Red Foxes	Poughkeepsie, NY
		Report		Stadium: Leonidoff Field

September 21 Non-conference	Howard University	4-0	VMI Keydets	Lexington, VA
		Report		Stadium: Patchin Field

September 26 Conference	St. Francis Brooklyn Terriers	1-0	Howard University	Washington, DC
		Report		Stadium: Greene Stadium

September 28 Non-conference	Howard University	0-4	#4 Duke Blue Devils	Durham, N.C.
		Report		Stadium: Koskinen Stadium

September 30 Conference	Howard University	0-5	Merrimack Warriors	North Andover, MA
		Report		Stadium: Martone-Mejail Field

October

October 3 Conference	Howard University	0-3	Central Connecticut Blue Devils	New Britain, CT
		Report		Stadium: CCSU Soccer Field

October 6 Non-Conference	Howard University	1-2	UMBC Retrievers	Baltimore, MD
		Report		Stadium: Retriever Soccer Park

October 10 Conference	Howard University	1-3	LIU Sharks	Brooklyn, NY
		Report		Stadium: LIU Soccer Park

October 14 Conference	Bryant Bulldogs	0-3	Howard University	Washington, DC
		Report		Stadium: Greene Stadium

October 17 Conference	Howard University	0-1	Mount St. Mary's Mountaineers	Emmitsburg, MD
		Report		Stadium: Waldron Family Stadium

October 24 Conference	Sacred Heart Pioneers	1-1	Howard University	Washington, DC
		Report		Stadium: Greene Stadium

October 31 Conference	Howard University	1-5	Fairleigh Dickinson Knights	Teaneck, NJ
		Report		Stadium: FDU Stadium

November

November 7 Conference	Saint Francis Red Flash	0-2	Howard University	Washington, DC
		Report		Stadium: Greene Stadium
