= 2022 Howard Bison men's soccer team =

American college soccer season

2022 Howard Bison men's soccer
- Conference: Northeast Conference
- Record: 2-11-2 (1-5-2 Northeast Conference)
- Head coach: Phillip Gyau (8th season)
- Assistant coach: Emile Ebouh (4th season)
- Home stadium: Greene Stadium

The 2022 Howard Bison men's soccer team represented Howard University during the 2021 NCAA Division I men's soccer season. They were led by eight year head coach Phillip Gyau.

== Roster ==
The 2021-2022 roster for the Howard Men's Bison. Note: Flags indicate national team as defined under FIFA eligibility rules; some limited exceptions apply. Players may hold more than one non-FIFA nationality.

No.	Pos.	Nation	Player
1	GK	USA	JR Gawel
2	DF	USA	Jackson Lewis
3	DF	USA	Roy Henderson
4	DF	USA	Brian Ballard
5	MF	JAM	Jelani Pierre
6	DF	USA	Alex Taylor
7	FW	USA	Nathan Leggett
8	MF	CAN	Ethan Persard
9	FW	NGA	Sammy Oladeji
10	FW	BER	Mason Christian
11	FW	USA	Bryson Baker
12	FW	USA	Ashri Settles
13	MF	USA	Roman Stallings
14	FW	USA	Nigel Mccloud
15	DF	USA	Miles Sims

No.	Pos.	Nation	Player
16	MF	GHA	Kwado Nyarko
17	MF	USA	Chayton Kudlian
18	DF	USA	Rameses Gaines
19	DF	USA	John Haithcock
20	MF	KSA	Abdullah Al-Jirafi
21	GK	USA	Albert Mercer
22	DF	USA	Brandon Franklin
23	MF	USA	Asong Nkemanjong
24	DF	USA	Christian Bernard
25	FW	ERI	Christian Rufael
26	DF	USA	Khari Davis
27	FW	USA	Ezekiel Agyemang
28	MF	MWI	Waitpaso Banda
29	FW	USA	Jorden Julien
30	MF	USA	Peter Gonsallo
31	GK	USA	Ryan Nejadian

== Players arriving ==
Howard signed these players during the 2022 recruiting period.

Name	Nat.	Hometown	Club	TDS Rating
Mason Christian FW	BMA	Fulton, Md.	Transfer from James Madison Dukes	2/5 stars
Brandon Franklin DF	USA	Bethesda, Md.	Transfer from Duquesne Dukes	2/5 stars
Barkan Killic DF	GER	Braunschweig, LS	Transfer from Arkansas Rich Mountain	

== Player statistics ==
No.	Player	Class	Goals	Assists	GS	GP
11	(United States) Bryson Baker	SO.	6	1	9	9
14	(United States) Nigel Mccloud	FR.	2	0	5	5
10	(Bermuda) Mason Christian	JR.	2	0	9	9
7	(United States) Nathan Leggett	JR.	1	3	9	9
29	(United States) Jorden Julien	FR.	0	1	1	6
