= Senator Suazo =

Senator Suazo may refer to:

- Alicia Suazo (fl. 1990s–2000s), Utah State Senate
- Pete Suazo (died 2001), Utah State Senate
