= Real Carenero =

Coordinates: 36°28′08″N 6°10′55″W

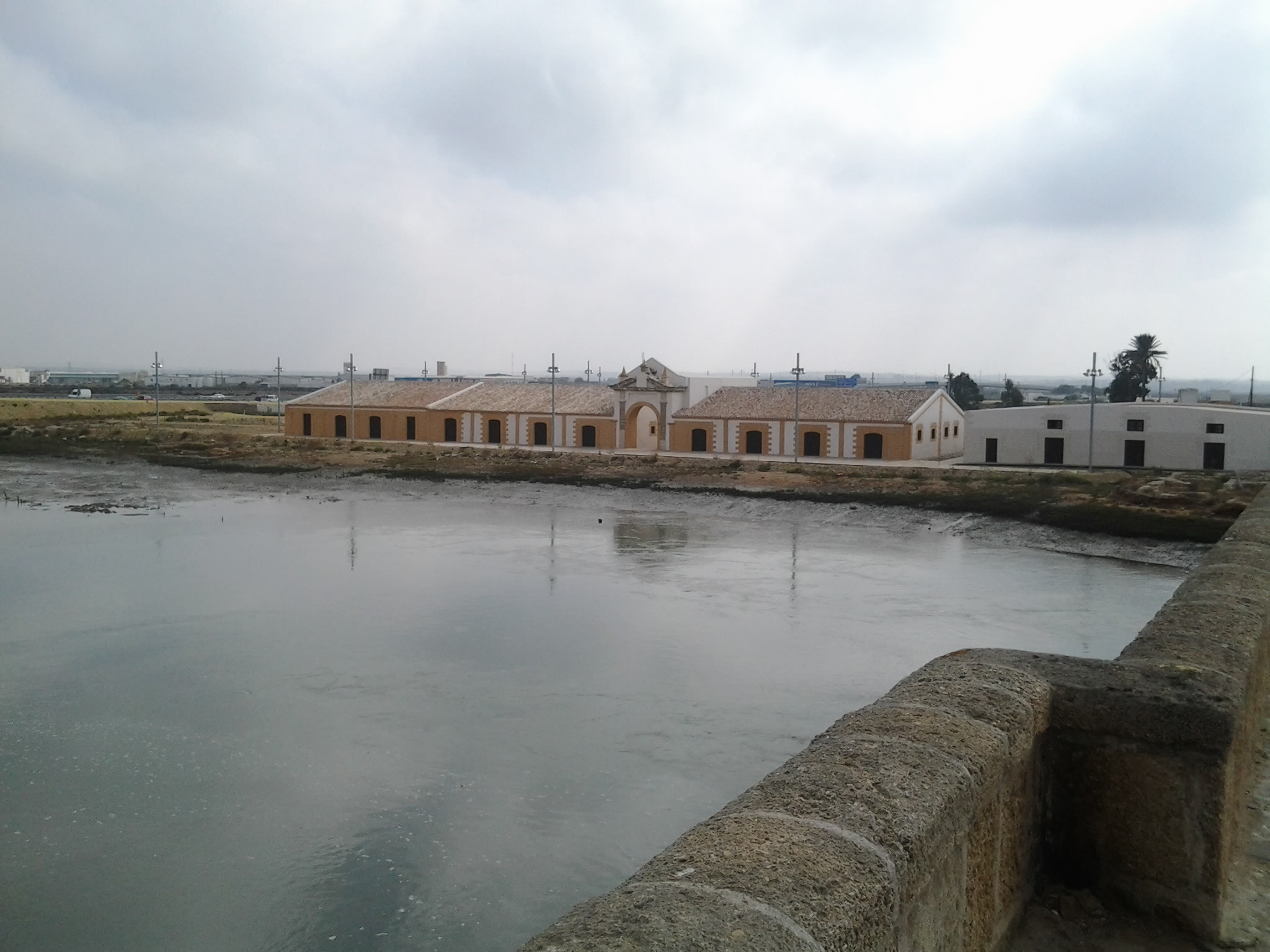
- General view of Real Carenero from the Zuazo Bridge
- Interactive map of Real Carenero
- Location: Puerto Real
- Type: Shipyard
- Completion date: 15th century
- Website: www.realcarenero.com/

Real Carenero is an old shipyard located in Puerto Real in the Province of Cádiz, Andalusia, Spain. It dates to the 15th century, and was built near the Puente Zuazo.
