= Howard Bison men's soccer =

American college soccer team

- Founded: 1965; 61 years ago
- University: Howard University
- Head coach: Phillip Gyau (7th season)
- Conference: NEC
- Location: Washington, District of Columbia, US
- Stadium: Greene Stadium (capacity: 7,086)
- Nickname: Bison
- Colors: Navy blue and white
Home	Away

NCAA tournament championships
- 1971 (Note: In January 1973, the NCAA officially announced that the Bison had violated three rules related to player eligibility. As a result, the title was vacated and the University was punished. Howard's head coach Lincoln Phillips accused NCAA of "practicing racism" due to the 1971 team was mostly composed of African-American players.), 1974

NCAA tournament runner-up
- 1988

NCAA tournament College Cup
- 1970*, 1971*, 1972, 1974, 1975, 1988

NCAA tournament Quarterfinals
- 1962, 1970*, 1971*, 1972, 1974, 1975, 1988, 1989

NCAA tournament Round of 16
- 1962, 1963, 1970*, 1971*, 1972, 1974, 1975, 1976, 1980, 1988, 1989

NCAA tournament appearances
- 1962, 1963, 1970*, 1971*, 1972, 1974, 1975, 1976, 1977, 1980, 1988, 1989, 1997 *vacated by NCAA

The Howard Bison men's soccer team is a varsity intercollegiate athletic team of Howard University in Washington, D.C., United States. The team is an associate member of the Northeast Conference, which is part of the National Collegiate Athletic Association's Division I. Howard's first men's soccer team was fielded in 1965. The team plays its home games at Greene Stadium near the Park View neighborhood of the District. The Bison are coached by Howard alumnus and former U.S. national team player, Phillip Gyau.

== History ==
Howard achieved much of their success in the early to mid-1970s and in the late 1980s, where they would win two NCAA Division I Men's Soccer Championships (1971 and 1974), and reach the College Cup on six occasions. The 1971 title would later be vacated by the NCAA. Howard is the first historically black university to win an NCAA soccer title (or any Division I national title). Despite these achievements, the Bison have had less success in modern times, with their last NCAA berth coming in 1997.

== Players ==
=== Current roster ===
The 2021-22 roster for the Howard Men's Bison. Note: Flags indicate national team as defined under FIFA eligibility rules; some limited exceptions apply. Players may hold more than one non-FIFA nationality.

No.	Pos.	Nation	Player
1	GK	USA	JR Gawel
2	DF	USA	Jackson Lewis
3	DF	USA	Roy Henderson
4	DF	USA	Brian Ballard
5	MF	TRI	Jelani Pierre
6	DF	USA	Alex Taylor
7	FW	USA	Nathan Leggett
8	MF	CAN	Ethan Persard
9	FW	NGA	Sammy Oladeji
10	FW	BER	Mason Christian
11	FW	USA	Bryson Baker
12	FW	USA	Ashri Settles
13	MF	USA	Roman Stallings
14	FW	USA	Nigel Mccloud
15	DF	USA	Miles Sims

No.	Pos.	Nation	Player
16	MF	GHA	Kwado Nyarko
17	MF	USA	Chayton Kudlian
18	DF	BAN	Rameses Gaines
19	DF	USA	John Haithcock
20	MF	KSA	Abdullah Al-Jirafi
21	GK	USA	Albert Mercer
22	DF	USA	Brandon Franklin
23	MF	USA	Asong Nkemanjong
24	DF	USA	Christian Bernard
25	FW	ERI	Christian Rufael
26	DF	USA	Khari Davis
27	FW	USA	Ezekiel Agyemang
28	MF	MWI	Waitpaso Banda
29	FW	USA	Jorden Julien
30	MF	USA	Peter Gonsallo
31	GK	USA	Ryan Nejadian

=== Players in the pros ===
Howard Bison's that have played professionally include.

Nat.	Player	Year	Notable Teams	Ref.
(Trinidad and Tobago)	Keith Aqui	1971	Baltimore Comets (NASL)	
(Trinidad and Tobago)	Al Henderson	1972	Baltimore Comets (NASL)	
(Trinidad and Tobago)	Ian Bain	1975	Washington Darts (NASL)	
(United States)	Phillip Gyau	1985	Montreal Impact, Tampa Bay Rowdies, Washington Diplomats	
(Jamaica)	Peter Isaacs	1989	Fort Lauderdale Strikers, Tampa Bay Cyclones	
(Trinidad and Tobago)	Shaka Hislop	1991	West Ham, Newcastle United, Portsmouth FC	
(Jamaica)	Greg Simmonds	1998	DC United, Miami Fusion, Rochester Rhinos	
(United States)	Ray Goodlett	1998	DC United, Richmond Kickers	
(Trinidad and Tobago)	Nigel Henry	2000	Montreal Impact, Charleston Battery	
(United States)	Idris Ughiovhe	2005	Chicago Fire, Crystal Palace Baltimore	
(United States)	Jason Gross	2008	NJ Ironmen	
(United States)	Samuel Howard	2016	IFK Amal, Union Omaha, OKC Energy FC	
(United States)	Andres Gomez	2020	Nykoping	

=== Individual achievements ===
Howard has produced five first team All-Americans.

Player	Pos.	Year(s)
Al Henderson	FW	1970, 1971
Keith Aqui	FW	1970
Ian Bain	FW	1972
Peter Isaacs	FW	1989

== Titles ==
=== National ===
- NCAA tournament (1): ~~1971~~, 1974
