= Utah's 2nd State Senate district =

American legislative district

Senator
Chris H. Wilson; R–Logan

Utah's 1st State Senate district is one of 29 Utah State Senate districts. It covers most of Cache County and all of Rich County. The current State Senator is Republican Chris H. Wilson.

== Previous Utah State Senators (District 2) ==
Name	Party	Term
Chris H. Wilson	Republican	2023–present (redistricted from the 25th District)
Derek Kitchen	Democratic	2018–2022
Jim Dabakis	Democratic	2012–2018
Ben McAdams	Democratic	2009–2012
Scott D. McCoy	Democratic	2005–2009
Paula Julander	Democratic	2003–2005
Alicia Suazo	Democratic	2001–2002
Pete Suazo	Democratic	1997–2001
W. Rex Black	Democratic	1973–1997
Richard V. Evans	Democratic	1967–1972
Reed Bullen	Republican	1955–1966
Vern B. Muir	Republican	1951–1954
Hyrum Gibbons	Republican	1947–1950
James A. McMurrin	Democratic	1939–1946
William H. Griffin	Republican	1927–1938
Clarence L. Funk		1923–1926
Joseph E. Quinney		1921–1922
James W. Funk		1911–1920
Herschel Bullen	Republican	1907–1910
Alonzo G. Barber	Democratic	1903–1906
Joseph Howell	Republican	1899–1902
Joseph Monson	Democratic	1897–1898
Warrun Noble	Democratic	1896

== Election results ==
Utah State Senate election, 2014
Party	Candidate	Votes	%	±%
Democratic	Jim Dabakis	16,446	74.18	
Republican	Jacquie Nielsen	5,724	25.82	

Utah State Senate election, 2010
Party	Candidate	Votes	%	±%
Democratic	Ben McAdams	13,663	73.59	
Republican	Melvin D. Nimer	4,863	26.19	

In December 2009, Scott McCoy resigned from his position because he "simply cannot find the necessary time to be a successful attorney and give the time and energy to fully represent the residents of my district." This resulted in the appointment of Ben McAdams to represent the district. In 2010, Ben McAdams was elected to a four-year term.

Utah State Senate election, 2006
Party	Candidate	Votes	%	±%
Democratic	Scott D. McCoy	12,614	68.58	
Republican	Joseph Q. Jarvis	4,999	27.18	
Personal Choice	Ken Larsen	443	2.41	
Constitution	Ken A. Bowers	322	1.75	

== See also ==
- Ben McAdams
- Scott D. McCoy
- Utah Democratic Party
- Utah Republican Party
- Utah Senate

Preceded by Scott D. McCoy	Ben McAdams; 2009 - Present	Succeeded by Incumbent
