= Michael Brady (soccer) =

English-born, American soccer player

Mike Brady
Personal information
- Full name: Michael Brady
- Date of birth: July 1, 1964 (age 62)
- Place of birth: Chicago, IL
- Positions: Midfielder; forward

College career
Years	Team	Apps	(Gls)
1982–1985	American University		

Senior career*
Years	Team	Apps	(Gls)
1985	Club España		
1985–1987	Baltimore Blast (indoor)	48	(5)
1986	Los Angeles Heat	?	(5)
1988–1989	Washington Diplomats		
1990	Penn-Jersey Spirit	5	(1)
1991	Maryland Bays	3	(2)
1993	Tampa Bay Rowdies		
1994–1995	Baltimore Spirit (indoor)	8	(0)
1997	Cape Cod Crusaders		

International career
1984–1985	United States	3	(0)

Managerial career
- 1991: American University
- 1993–1996: The Potomac School
- 2000–2008: American University
- 2008–: Duke University (assistant)
- * Club domestic league appearances and goals

Michael Brady is a retired soccer player who is the associate head coach for the Duke University men's soccer team. He previously coached the American University women's soccer team. He played professionally, both indoors and out, in the United States. He also earned three caps with the U.S. national team in 1984 and 1985.

Born in the United States and raised in England, he represented the United States at international level.

== Player ==
=== College ===
Brady was born in Chicago to Irish parents but returned to Coventry, England at 6 months old. In 1981, Brady traveled from Coventry to Jacksonville, Florida for a trial with the Jacksonville Tea Men. On the advice of the coaching staff, he elected to attend college in the United States instead. After some thought, he chose American University, a private college located in Washington, D.C.. Brady spent four seasons with the AU Eagles as both a midfielder and forward. In 1985, the Eagles went to the championship match only to fall to UCLA in eight overtimes. Brady was a first team All American as a midfielder in 1983 and as a forward in 1985 and finished his career as the 1985. He was a second team All American in 1984, but his greatest honor came when he was named the 1985 SoccerAmerica college Player of the Year. He finished his collegiate career with 66 goals and 29 assists. He holds the season goal scoring record with 24 goals as a senior. In 1986, AU retired Brady's jersey number, 14. While he had not yet completed his degree requirements, like many athletes, Brady left school to pursue a professional career. However, he would return and earn a bachelor's degree in communications in 1992. In 2007, American University inducted Brady into its Athletic Hall of Fame.

In the summer of 1985, Brady played for the Club España of Washington, D.C. The amateur team won the 1985 National Amateur Cup.

=== Professional ===
When Brady entered the professional ranks, he began an itinerant journey through U.S. soccer. The 1980s and 1990s were characterized by players jumping from one failing indoor and outdoor club to another in an attempt to play the game they loved. Brady began his professional career with the Baltimore Blast of Major Indoor Soccer League (MISL). In 1985, he spent a season with the Los Angeles Heat of the Western Soccer Alliance (WSA) where he scored five goals, tied for eighth on the alliance's goals list. In 1988 and 1989, he played with the Washington Diplomats of the American Soccer League (ASL), earning All Star status in 1989. In 1990, the ASL and WSA merged to form the American Professional Soccer League. In 1993, he played three games with the Tampa Bay Rowdies (APSL). In 1994, he signed with the Baltimore Spirit. He played eleven games, then retired. In 1997, he came out of retirement to play one season with the Cape Cod Crusaders of the USISL.

=== National team ===
In 1983, Brady was a member of the U.S. soccer team at the 1983 World University games. He then earned three caps with the U.S. national team while still in college. His first cap came when he replace Jeff Hooker in a 30 November 1984 scoreless tie with Ecuador. A week later, he came on for Amr Aly in another tie with Ecuador. His last cap came, again as a substitute, this time for Dan Canter on 16 June 1985.

== Coach ==
While with the Maryland Bays in 1991, Brady also served as the head coach for the American University women's soccer team. In 1993, he became the head coach of the boys' soccer team at The Potomac School in McLean, Virginia. He served in that capacity for four years before moving to Premier Soccer Associates which runs soccer camps and clinics. In 2000, he returned to American University where he became the coach of the women's team again. In 2008, he left American to join Duke University as the top assistant coach. He became the associate head coach shortly after and has served in that role since.
