= 1988 Orlando Lions season =

Orlando Lions
1988 season
- American Soccer League: Southern Division: Fourth place
- Average home league attendance: 2,736

The 1988 Orlando Lions season was the first season of the new team in the new American Soccer League. The club originally started in 1985. In the league's inaugural year, the team finished in fourth place in the Southern Division of the league. They did not make the playoffs.

== Competitions ==
=== ASL regular season ===
==== League standings ====
===== Northern Division =====
| Place | Team | GP | W | L | GF | GA | Points |
|---|---|---|---|---|---|---|---|
| 1 | New Jersey Eagles | 20 | 15 | 5 | 39 | 24 | 45 |
| 2 | Maryland Bays | 20 | 12 | 8 | 32 | 31 | 36 |
| 3 | Washington Stars | 20 | 11 | 9 | 31 | 28 | 33 |
| 4 | Boston Bolts | 20 | 9 | 11 | 31 | 33 | 27 |
| 5 | Albany Capitals | 20 | 7 | 13 | 26 | 35 | 21 |

===== Southern Division =====
| Place | Team | GP | W | L | GF | GA | Points |
|---|---|---|---|---|---|---|---|
| 1 | Fort Lauderdale Strikers | 20 | 14 | 6 | 46 | 25 | 42 |
| 2 | Washington Diplomats | 20 | 10 | 10 | 27 | 30 | 30 |
| 3 | Tampa Bay Rowdies | 20 | 10 | 10 | 23 | 21 | 30 |
| 4 | Orlando Lions | 20 | 8 | 12 | 21 | 31 | 24 |
| 5 | Miami Sharks | 20 | 4 | 16 | 24 | 42 | 12 |
