= Ray Goodlett =

American soccer player

Personal information
- Full name: Raymond Goodlett
- Date of birth: November 20, 1976 (age 49)
- Place of birth: Olney, Maryland, U.S.
- Height: 5 ft 10 in (1.78 m)
- Position: Defender

Youth career
- 1994–1997: Howard Bison

Senior career*
Years	Team	Apps	(Gls)
1999–2000	Hershey Wildcats	27	(0)
1999	→ D.C. United (loan)	0	(0)
2000–2001	D.C. United	4	(0)
2001–2003	Richmond Kickers	52	(2)
2006	Richmond Kickers	15	(0)
- * Club domestic league appearances and goals

Ray Goodlett is an American retired soccer defender who spent one season in Major League Soccer with D.C. United.

Goodlett graduated from Sherwood High School. He attended Howard University, playing on the men's soccer team from 1994 to 1997. On April 12, 1999, Goodlett signed with the Hershey Wildcats of the USL A-League. On July 25, 1999, he went on loan to D.C. United of Major League Soccer, but was an unused substitute. In 2000, Goodlett began the season with the Wildcats, but D.C. United signed him on July 12, 2000. He played four games that season. United waived Goodlett on May 4, 2001. On May 18, 2001, the Richmond Kickers signed Goodlett. Following the 2003 season, Goodlett retired in order to attend Fuller Theological Seminary. He graduated in June 2004 and became the Director of Every Nation Campus Ministries at the University of Richmond. This led to his return to the Kickers, now playing in the USL Second Division, on March 21, 2006, for a single season. He is now a pastor at Redemption Hill Church. His wife, Heather, is the executive director of the Darrell Green Youth Life Foundation of Richmond.

He is a cousin of Gregory Simmonds.
