= Chesapeake Dragons =

American soccer team

- Full name: Chesapeake Athletic Dragons
- Nickname: The Dragons
- Founded: 2001
- Ground: Maryland SoccerPlex
- Capacity: 4,000
- League: USL Premier Development League
- 2004: 6th, Mid-Atlantic Division
| Home colours | Away colours |

The Chesapeake Dragons were an American soccer team, founded in 2001. The team was a member of the United Soccer Leagues Premier Development League (PDL), the fourth tier of the American soccer pyramid, until 2004, when the team left the league and the franchise was terminated.

The Premier Development League awarded Bowie, Maryland an expansion team in January 2001. They ended their inaugural 2021 season with a record of 3-7. They played their home games that season on the Bowie State University campus. Sumed Ibrahim was a member of the 2001 squad.

Eventually, the Dragons played their home games at the Maryland SoccerPlex in the city of Germantown, Maryland, 31 miles northwest of downtown Washington, DC. The team's colors were blue, silver and black.

== Final Squad ==
vs West Virginia Chaos, 14 July 2004 Note: Flags indicate national team as defined under FIFA eligibility rules; some limited exceptions apply. Players may hold more than one non-FIFA nationality.

| No. | Pos. | Nation | Player |
|---|---|---|---|
| 1 | GK | USA | Zak Thompson |
| 2 | FW | USA | Mark Murphy |
| 3 | MF | USA | Jonathan Bernard |
| 4 | DF | USA | Samuel Hale |
| 5 | DF | USA | Jeremiah Burke |
| 7 | MF | USA | Matt Allen |
| 10 | MF | BER | Kwame Steede |

| No. | Pos. | Nation | Player |
|---|---|---|---|
| 12 | DF | TRI | Derek Phillips |
| 14 | MF | USA | Jamil Decker |
| 16 | MF | USA | Matthew Waddell |
| 17 | MF | BER | Raymond Beach |
| 18 | MF | BER | Hayes Wolfe |
| 20 | DF | USA | Kurt Borel |
| 21 | FW | USA | Ibrahim Diane |

== Year-by-year ==
| Year | Division | League | Reg. season | Playoffs | Open Cup |
|---|---|---|---|---|---|
| 2001 | 4 | USL PDL | 7th, Northeast | Did not qualify | Did not qualify |
| 2002 | 4 | USL PDL | 4th, Mid-Atlantic | Did not qualify | Did not qualify |
| 2003 | 4 | USL PDL | 4th, Mid-Atlantic | Did not qualify | Second Round |
| 2004 | 4 | USL PDL | 5th, Mid-Atlantic | Did not qualify | Did not qualify |

== Stadia ==
- Bowie State Stadium, Bowie, Maryland 2003
- Maryland SoccerPlex, Germantown, Maryland 2004
