= Beacon Bank Field at Foley Stadium =

City sports stadium in Worcester, Massachusetts, U.S.

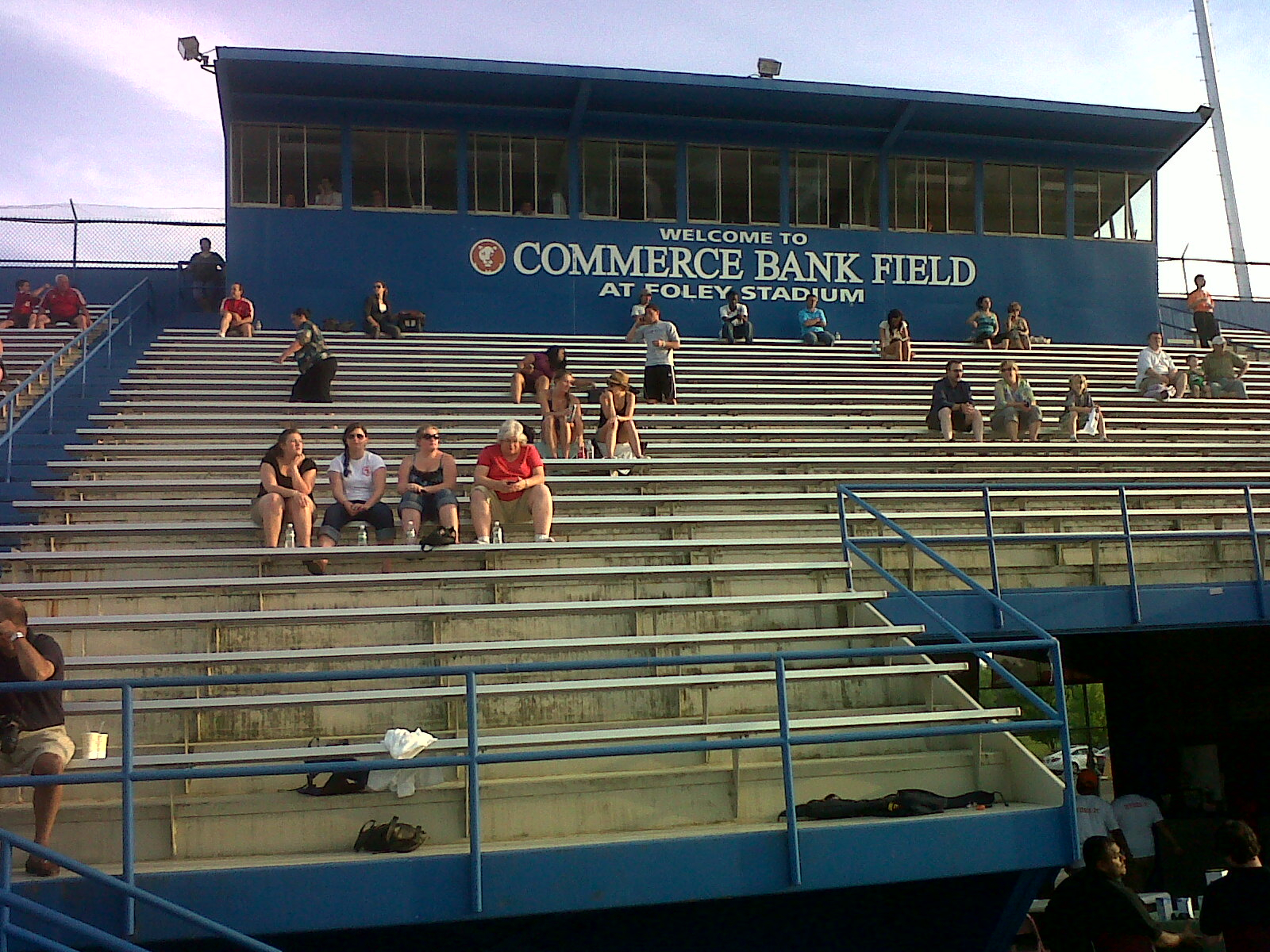
- Interactive map of Beacon Bank Field at Foley Stadium
- Location: 305 Chandler Street; Worcester, Massachusetts
- Coordinates: 42°15′46.54″N 71°49′25.03″W
- Owner: City of Worcester
- Operator: City of Worcester
- Capacity: 4,000
- Surface: Turf (football) grass (baseball)

Construction
- Opened: 1927
- Renovated: 2007, 2019

Tenant
- Worcester Hydra (USL PDL) (2012)

Beacon Bank Field at Foley Stadium is a historic sports venue in Worcester, Massachusetts. Beginning in 1922, the site held the Worcester Athletic Field. A new stadium facility was built there and dedicated in 1965 as Foley Stadium, named in honor of local war hero and former police chief General Thomas F. Foley. The project added seating for 4,800 fans, locker rooms, press box, and lights.

A renovation in 2007 included replacing the natural turf of the field with artificial turf. Part of the cost was defrayed by selling naming rights to Commerce Bank & Trust Company for one million dollars, with the new name being Commerce Bank Field at Foley Stadium. In 2017, Commerce Bank was acquired by Berkshire Bank, so the sports complex became Berkshire Bank Field at Foley Stadium. The name changed again, to Beacon Bank Field at Foley Stadium, following a 2025 bank merger.

The stadium is used primarily for high school sports in Worcester, including football, soccer, lacrosse, and field hockey.
