= Sonny Askew =

American soccer player (born 1957)

Personal information
- Full name: John Askew
- Date of birth: April 17, 1957 (age 69)
- Place of birth: Baltimore, Maryland, U.S.
- Position: Forward

College career
Years	Team	Apps	(Gls)
1975–1976	Essex Community College		

Senior career*
Years	Team	Apps	(Gls)
1977–1980	Washington Diplomats	53	(11)
1978	Washington Diplomats (indoor)		
1980–1981	Baltimore Blast (indoor)	11	(2)
1981	Montreal Manic	21	(1)
1982	Georgia Generals		(4)
1983	Team America	14	(0)
1984	Tampa Bay Rowdies	7	(1)
1987–1989	Washington Stars		

International career
1979–1984	United States	4	(0)

Managerial career
- Essex Community College
- * Club domestic league appearances and goals

John "Sonny" Askew (born April 17, 1957) is an American retired soccer forward who spent seven seasons in the North American Soccer League, two in the second American Soccer League, two in the third American Soccer League, and one in the Major Indoor Soccer League. He also earned four caps with the United States men's national soccer team.

== Youth ==
Askew grew up in Baltimore, Maryland where he was a Parade High School All-American soccer player at Patterson High School. He then attended and played soccer at Essex Community College. He was a 1976 NJCAA All-American. In 2005, he was inducted into the National Junior College Athletic Association Men's Soccer Hall of Fame for his time playing for Essex.

== Professional ==
Askew joined the Washington Dips of the North American Soccer League for the 1977 season. He also played indoor for the Dips in early 1978. He continued to play outdoor for them through 1980 before moving to the Montreal Manic for the 1981 season. In 1981, he signed with the expansion Baltimore Blast of Major Indoor Soccer League, playing only one season of indoor soccer. In 1982, he moved to the Georgia Generals of the second American Soccer League, but was back in the NASL for the short-lived Team America in 1983. In 1984, the last year of the NASL's existence, he played for the Tampa Bay Rowdies. With the collapse of the NASL following the 1984 season, Askew moved to the amateur Spartans of the Northern Virginia Soccer League. In July 1987, Askew signed with F.C. Washington as the team prepared for the first season of the newly established American Soccer League in 1988. By the beginning of the new league in the spring of 1988, the team had been renamed the Washington Stars. Askew spent two seasons with the Stars. He was a 1988 ASL All Star.

== National team ==
Askew he earned four caps with the United States men's national soccer team. His first was a 3–1 victory over Bermuda on July 10, 1979. His last cap came in a 2–2 tie with Ecuador on February 12, 1984.

== Coach ==
He coached the Essex Community College men's soccer team and was listed by Chicago Fire goalkeeper Zach Thornton as his most influential soccer figure. He now coaches at Pipeline Soccer Club and is on the Board of Directors of the club as well.

He was inducted into Maryland Soccer Hall of Fame.
