= Worcester Hydra =

- Full name: Worcester Hydra F.C.
- Nickname: The Hydra
- Founded: 2011; 15 years ago
- Ground: Foley Stadium; Worcester, MA
- Capacity: 4,000
- Chairman: Phong Le
- Manager: Elvis Comrie
- League: USL Premier Development League
- 2012: T-4th, Northeast Division; Playoffs: DNQ
- Website: http://hydrafc.com/
Home colors	Away colors

Worcester Hydra was an American soccer team based in Worcester, Massachusetts, United States. Founded in 2011, the team played in the USL Premier Development League (PDL), the fourth tier of the American Soccer Pyramid, in the Northeast Division of the Eastern Conference. The team played its home games at Foley Stadium in Worcester, Massachusetts.

== History ==
Worcester began their inaugural season in May 2012, playing at Foley Stadium. They appointed former US international player, and former Holy Cross head coach, Elvis Comrie, as head coach. Their first game was against Seacoast United Phantoms, which ended in a 1–0 defeat for the Hydra. Worcester gained their first-ever win, and first-ever goals, in a 2–0 victory over Boston Victory, both goals being scored by forward Alencar Junior. However, following the 2012 season, the Hydra announced it would not be returning to the PDL for the 2013 season, citing financial issues.

Previous logo

== Year-by-year ==
Year	Division	League	Reg. season	Playoffs	Open Cup
2012	4	USL PDL	T-4th, Northeast	Did not qualify	Did not qualify

== Squad ==
=== Players ===
As of May 5, 2012.

Note: Flags indicate national team as defined under FIFA eligibility rules; some limited exceptions apply. Players may hold more than one non-FIFA nationality.

No.	Pos.	Nation	Player
1	GK		Oliver Blum
2	MF		Laurence Braude
3	DF		Andrew Mattarazzo
4	DF		Russell Guidici
5	DF		Ambry Moss
6	MF		Evan Burokas
8	MF		Brett Uttley
9	MF		Charles Rugg
10	FW		Alencar Junior
11	MF		Bruno Bonicontro
14	FW		Michael Soboff
15	FW		Nicholas Corliss
16	GK		Jose Silva
17	DF		Christopher Ager
19	DF		Matheus Candido
25	FW		Ebrima "Eboy" Badgie
