= Darrell Green =

American football player (born 1960)

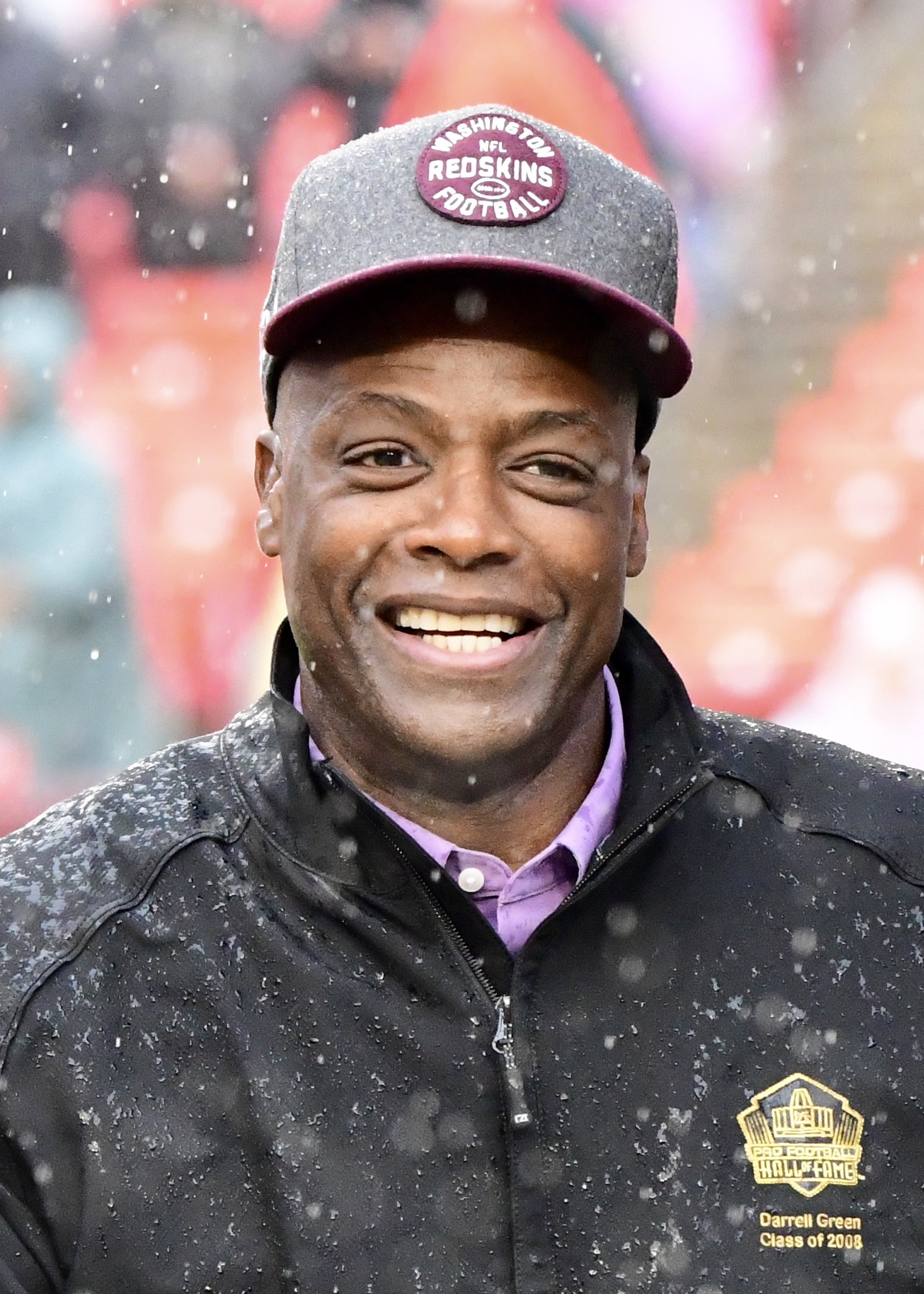
- Green in 2019

No. 28
- Position: Cornerback

Personal information
- Born: February 15, 1960 (age 66); Houston, Texas, U.S.
- Listed height: 5 ft 9 in (1.75 m)
- Listed weight: 184 lb (83 kg)

Career information
- High school: Jesse H. Jones (Houston)
- College: Texas A&I (1978–1982)
- NFL draft: 1983: 1st round, 28th overall pick

Career history
- Washington Redskins (1983–2002)

Awards and highlights
- 2× Super Bowl champion (XXII, XXVI); NFL Man of the Year (1996); 3× First-team All-Pro (1986, 1987, 1991); Second-team All-Pro (1990); 7× Pro Bowl (1984, 1986, 1987, 1990, 1991, 1996, 1997); PFWA All-Rookie Team (1983); NFL 1990s All-Decade Team; NFL 100th Anniversary All-Time Team; 90 Greatest Commanders; Washington Commanders Ring of Fame; Washington Commanders No. 28 retired; Lone Star Conference MVP (1982); 2x First-team LSC All-Conference (1981, 1982); NFL record: Most consecutive seasons with an interception: 19

Career NFL statistics
- Games played: 295
- Tackles: 1,159
- Interceptions: 54
- Touchdowns: 6
- Stats at Pro Football Reference
- Pro Football Hall of Fame
- College Football Hall of Fame

Darrell Ray Green (born February 15, 1960) is an American former professional football player who was a cornerback for the Washington Redskins of the National Football League (NFL) for 20 seasons. Considered to be one of the greatest cornerbacks and fastest players in NFL history, he played college football for the Texas A&M–Kingsville Javelinas and was drafted by the Redskins with the last pick in the first round of the 1983 NFL draft. Green played in 295 games with Washington, winning Super Bowls XXII and XXVI, before retiring in 2003. He was named the 1996 NFL Man of the Year, inducted into the Pro Football Hall of Fame in 2008, and included on the NFL 100th Anniversary All-Time Team.

== Early life ==
Green was born on February 15, 1960, in Houston, Texas, later attending Jesse H. Jones High School. While there, he was an All-State selection in track and an All-City pick in football. Severely undersized, Green was on the junior varsity football team his junior year, and then made the varsity team as a senior.

== College career ==
Green attended the then NAIA school Texas A&I University (now known as Texas A&M-Kingsville). While there he played football and ran track. He finished his Bachelor of Science degree in general studies at St. Paul's College in Lawrenceville, Virginia.

=== Football ===
In 1982, Green was selected by his teammates as captain, was named a first-team All-American, and was the Most Valuable Player in the Lone Star Conference. During his senior year, Green had 56 tackles, four interceptions and two punt returns for touchdowns. He was selected to the Lone Star Conference Team of the Decade for the 1980s.

=== Track and field ===
In track and field, Green set numerous national and conference records and earned ten All-America certificates. His first meet was in 1982 in San Angelo, Texas, where he ran a 10.08 in the 100 meters. The mark still stands as the all-time best in the Lone Star Conference. At the 1982 NCAA championships, Green finished sixth in the 100-meter dash and seventh in the 200-meter dash.

Green's all-time collegiate best in the 100 was 10.08, 20.50 in the 200 meters and 45.90 in the 400 meters. He was named the most valuable track performer at the 1982 and 1983 Lone Star Conference Championships. He won gold medals at the LSC meet in the 100 meters in 1981 and in the 100 meters and 200 meters in 1982 and in 1983.

Green was named to the NCAA Division I All-America roster in 1981 and 1982, and was on the NCAA Division II All-America team in five events in 1981 and 1982. He was NAIA All-America in 1981 and 1982 in four events.

==== Personal bests ====
Event	Time (seconds)	Venue	Date
50 meters	5.76	Rosemont, Illinois	January 15, 1983
100 meters	10.08	San Angelo, Texas	April 13, 1983
200 meters	20.48	Provo, Utah	June 2, 1983
40 yard dash	4.09	Carlisle, Pennsylvania	August, 1986

== Professional career ==
Green was the last player selected in the first round (28th overall) of the 1983 NFL draft by the Washington Redskins. The first time he touched the ball, during a preseason game against the Atlanta Falcons, he returned a punt 61 yards for a touchdown. During his first regular season game, he made his first big play when he ran down running back Tony Dorsett of the Dallas Cowboys to prevent a touchdown. Green started all 16 regular season games during his rookie season and finished fourth on the team in tackles with 109 and led the team in solo tackles with 79. He was runner-up for the Associated Press NFL Rookie of the Year Award.

"Seeing Darrell come in to the NFL at his size
and background, and to last as long he did, he
was extraordinary. To stay healthy, not get hurt, and
perform at his level was an absolutely amazing
feat. He was a classic player and a classic person."

— Sonny Jurgensen, on Darrell Green.

During the 1987 season, the Redskins went 11–4 and Green had a very successful year. He registered a career-high three interceptions in a game against the Detroit Lions on November 15, 1987. Two of his more notable performances occurred in that postseason. One happened during a divisional playoff game against the Chicago Bears, where he returned a punt 52 yards for the game-winning touchdown. Green tore rib cartilage while vaulting over a tackler during the return, but he merely grabbed his side and kept running until he scored. Then in the 1987 NFC Championship game, on a pivotal fourth-down play at the Washington goal line with 56 seconds remaining, Green knocked away a pass intended for Minnesota's Darrin Nelson to secure a Redskins 17–10 victory that enabled the team to go to Super Bowl XXII.

Green was also successful in the 1990s, receiving the Bart Starr Award in 1997. That season, he returned an interception 83 yards for a touchdown against the Philadelphia Eagles, which was the longest return of his career. Then on December 13, 1997, he played in his 217th career game as a Redskin, breaking Monte Coleman's record for games played. In a 1999 game against the Arizona Cardinals, he intercepted his 50th NFL pass against Jake Plummer at FedExField.

"Darrell signified perseverance and competitiveness,
and he was an all around great guy at the same time.
We were able to watch him for 20 years, and as far
as I'm concerned he never failed us. He was always a
stalwart in the community and he always maintained a
good heart."

— Bobby Mitchell, on Darrell Green.

In the last game of his career on December 29, 2002, Green and the Redskins defeated the Dallas Cowboys 20–14 at FedExField. During the game, he returned a punt on a reverse from Champ Bailey for 35 yards which is the longest gain of any kind for a player his age (42 years, 327 days).

Green retired after the 2002 season at the age of 42, the oldest Redskin, having played for six head coaches: Joe Gibbs, Richie Petitbon, Norv Turner, Terry Robiskie, Marty Schottenheimer, and Steve Spurrier. For several years, Green and former Los Angeles/St. Louis Rams offensive tackle Jackie Slater were the only players in NFL history to play for the same team for 20 seasons; kicker Jason Hanson broke this record when he retired after 21 seasons with the Detroit Lions.

In his 20 NFL seasons, Green recorded 54 interceptions, which he returned for 621 yards and six touchdowns. He also added two additional touchdowns on interception returns in the postseason. Three times he recorded a career-best of five interceptions in a season (1984, 1986, and 1991). Green also returned 51 punts for 611 yards and recovered 10 fumbles, returning them for 131 yards and two touchdowns. Also known for staying healthy, he missed just 25 games throughout his career. He missed two months after sustaining a broken arm in a 24–17 win over the Atlanta Falcons on September 15, 1992.

"Darrell epitomizes what an NFL player should be. In my
rookie season, he took me in and showed me the ropes,
all the while we were competing for the same position.
I looked up to him as a great player and a great man."

— Fred Smoot, on Darrell Green.

He is the four-time winner of the NFL's Fastest Man competition, and the only undefeated multiple winner in NFL history. Green is rumored to have the fastest recorded 40 yard dash time of 4.09, which he is said to have run in Washington's 1986 training camp.

Green was with the Redskins for their victories in Super Bowls XXII and XXVI, and started in their loss to the Los Angeles Raiders in Super Bowl XVIII. Green recorded an interception in Super Bowl XXVI and a then-record 34-yard punt return in Super Bowl XVIII.

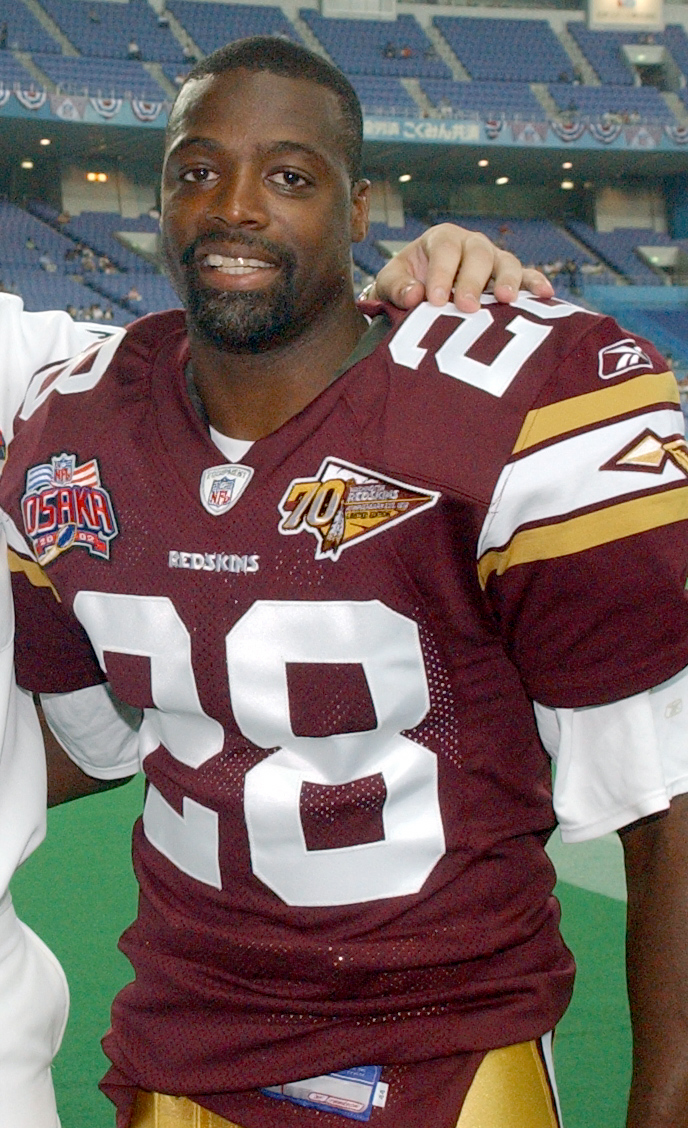
Green's final year with the Redskins, 2002

Green was named All-Pro in 1986, 1987, 1990, and 1991 and was voted to seven Pro Bowls. He is a member of the National Football League 1990s All-Decade Team as well as winning all four NFL Fastest Man competitions he participated in. His pregame rituals included eating and sticking Tootsie Rolls in his sock claiming that the candy helped him run fast. Washington retired his number 28 during halftime of a home game against the Carolina Panthers on October 20, 2024.

=== NFL records ===
- Most consecutive seasons with an interception: 19
- Most seasons with at least one touch (receptions, rushes, returns): 20 (tied with Jerry Rice)
- Oldest player with a more-than-35-yard gain (lateral on punt return): 42 years, 327 days
- Oldest player with an interception return for a touchdown in overtime: 35 years, 249 days
- Oldest player with an interception: 41 years, 304 days
- Oldest player with a more-than-80-yard interception return: 37 years, 309 days
- Oldest player with a non-offensive touchdown in overtime: 35 years, 249 days
- Oldest NFL defensive back: 42 years old
- Most games played by a defensive player: 295
- Reportedly 40-yard dash time of 4.09 seconds in Washington's 1986 training camp, which is the unofficial fastest time

=== Washington Redskins records ===
- Most career interceptions: 54
- Most games started: 258
- Most games played: 295
- Most consecutive seasons played: 20
- Longest fumble return for a touchdown: 78 yards
- Most interceptions returned for touchdown: 6

== After football ==
In 2006, Green was encouraged to run for the United States Senate by the Republican Party of Virginia. The Virginia Republicans wanted Green to enter into politics because of his longtime support for the community and dedication to Christianity.

Green was in the news on February 16, 2010, his 50th birthday, for reportedly running a 4.43-second 40-yard dash.

On April 26, 2013, Green announced that he had accepted a position as Special Assistant for Student–Athlete Development and Public Relations at the University of Mary Washington in Fredericksburg, Virginia.

On August 22, 2016, Green announced that he had accepted a position as an associate athletics director and special assistant to the athletic director at George Mason University.

=== Business ===
Green has a professional services company that manages his appearances and autograph requests, www.DarrellGreen.com. Green is currently an associate athletic director at George Mason University working with student-athletes to improve their well-being, and collaborating with the community. He also started an online fitness company promoting increased physical activity through simply walking called WalkFitHealth Nation.

=== Charities and foundations ===
In 1988, Green founded the Darrell Green Youth Life Foundation, a faith-based charitable organization, in an effort to "meet the needs of children, their families and the communities in which they live."

In addition, he served as a board member for the Baltimore-Washington 2012 Summer Olympics bid, NFL/NFLPA September 11 Relief Fund, and the Loudoun Education Foundation. In 2003, he was selected to serve as the Chair of President George W. Bush's Council on Service and Civic Participation. He currently sits on the boards of the Wolf Trap Foundation as its National Spokesman for Education and Marymount University.

=== Honors ===
"This is incredible. It's so special. This
literally transcends football, everything I have
gone through to do what I was able to do. It
was more than the ability to run and cover. It
just goes so far beyond that."

— Green, on being selected for the
Pro Football Hall of Fame.

In 1999, while still active, Green was ranked number 81 on The Sporting News' list of the 100 Greatest Football Players.

Green has received honorary Doctorates of Humane Letters from Marymount University in 1999, and St. Paul's College and George Washington University in 2002.

In 2004, Green was inducted into the College Football Hall of Fame and was inducted into the Pro Football Hall of Fame on August 2, 2008. His fellow Hall of Fame classmates include former Redskins teammate Art Monk, and his former position coach Emmitt Thomas. Green has also been inducted into the NCAA Division II Hall of Fame, the Texas Sports Hall of Fame, the Lone Star Conference Hall of Honor and the Javelina Hall of Fame.

In December 2007, Green was voted the All-Time Redskins Legend in a WUSA-TV Channel 9 online poll.

In Loudoun County, Virginia, where Green lives, State Route 28 is named Darrell Green Boulevard.

On February 4, 2018, as part of the postgame celebrations for the Philadelphia Eagles winning Super Bowl LII, Green was given the honor of bringing the Lombardi Trophy to the podium as it was presented to the Eagles for their 41–33 victory over the New England Patriots.

== Personal life ==
Green is married to his wife Jewel and has four children. His eldest son Jared is a pastor. He and his wife live in Ashburn, Virginia.

In 2013, he and Art Monk agreed that the name Redskins should possibly be changed.

== See also ==
- List of NFL career interceptions leaders
