= Scott McCoy =

American politician (born 1970)

Scott D. McCoy
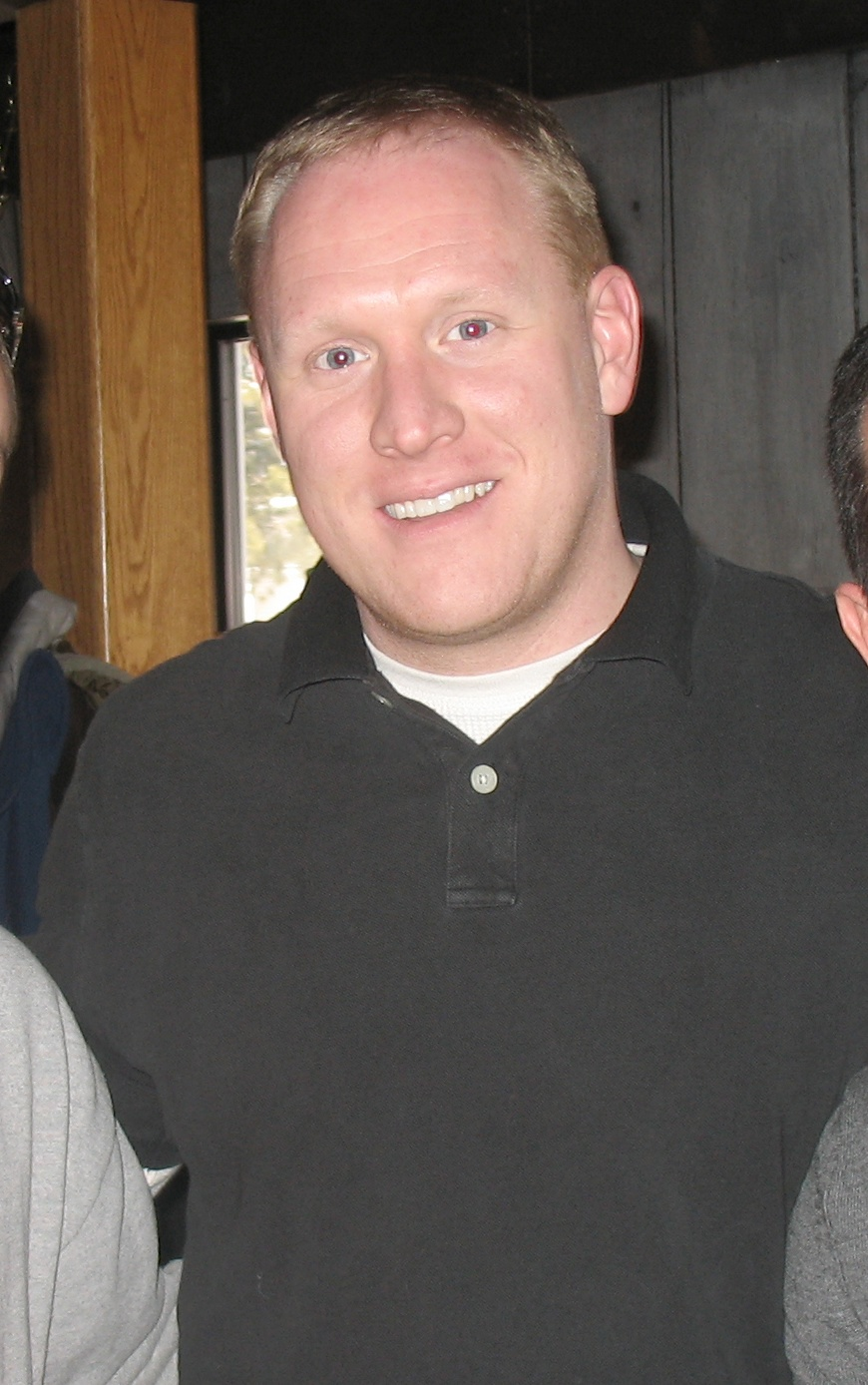

Member of the Utah Senate from the 2nd district
- In office February 7, 2005 – December 4, 2009
- Preceded by: Paula Julander
- Succeeded by: Ben McAdams

Personal details
- Born: August 19, 1970 (age 56)
- Party: Democratic
- Spouse: Mark Barr
- Education: William Jewell College (BA); George Washington University (MA); Yeshiva University (JD)
- Occupation: Attorney

Scott Daniel McCoy (born August 19, 1970) is an American politician and attorney from Florida. A Democrat, he is a former member of the Utah State Senate, where he represented the state's 2nd senate district which comprises portions of Salt Lake City (map). He resigned from the senate in December 2009 to dedicate himself more fully to his legal career.

== Early life and career ==
He was educated at William Jewell College in Liberty, Missouri (B.A., 1992), George Washington University in Washington, D.C. (M.A., 1994) and the Benjamin N. Cardozo School of Law in New York City (J.D., 2001). From January 2002 to March 2003, he served as law clerk to Justice Leonard H. Russon of the Utah Supreme Court. Scott was an associate at Cleary, Gottlieb, Steen & Hamilton from January 2001 to December 2001 before moving to Utah to clerk for Justice Russon. After finishing his clerkship he became a member of the Utah Bar and began practicing law at Bendinger, Crockett, Petersen, Greenwood and Casey, where he practiced commercial law with a focus on business litigation, antitrust, and federal securities. Scott was also active in the LGBT rights movement in Utah. He served as a member of the board of Equality Utah. Scott also served as a member of and as chair of the Salt Lake City Police Civilian Review Board. After leaving Utah in 2011, Scott returned to New York City to practice law at Cleary Gottlieb again from 2011 to 2014.

== Senate career ==
McCoy was appointed to the seat by Utah Democratic Party delegates in February 2005, following the resignation of Senator Paula Julander on health grounds. He beat Julander's husband – longtime party leader Rod Julander – by 44 votes to 41 in the final selection vote. His appointment was then formalized by Governor Jon Huntsman, Jr. He ran for re-election in 2006 and faced little opposition in this reliably Democratic district, defeating his Republican opponent by more than two-to-one.

McCoy, who lives with his husband Mark Barr, was Utah's first-ever openly gay state senator.

In 2004, he led the Don't Amend Alliance, the statewide campaign against a proposed amendment to Utah's state constitution regarding eligibility for marriage. His re-election campaign won the support of the Gay & Lesbian Victory Fund.

McCoy was one of four Democratic legislative sponsors of the 2009 Common Ground Initiative, the most expansive legislative push for gay rights in state history. The drive, crafted in response to statements by the Salt Lake City-based Church of Jesus Christ of Latter-day Saints, which has indicated that it does not oppose some rights for same-sex couples, includes creating a statewide domestic-partner registry and protecting someone from being fired or evicted for being gay. McCoy's Common Ground bill would have amended state law so that financial dependents – besides spouses, parents and children – could sue if a breadwinner suffers a wrongful death. The measure would have benefited same-sex couples, but also other nontraditional households, such as one in which a grandmother relies on a grandson for financial support. It died early in the 2009 Legislature when it was voted down by the Senate judiciary committee, led by Republican Sen. Chris Buttars.

In 2009, McCoy resigned from his position of Senator to pursue being a lawyer full time.

McCoy and Barr moved to New York City in June 2011, where they got married on July 24, 2011, the first day that same-sex marriages were legal in New York.

McCoy is also known for his wry sense of humor. After Buttars, on hearing of McCoy's appointment to the senate, asked "Who, the gay?!", McCoy quickly ordered a vanity plate for his car that read "THEGAY".

== Election results ==
2006 Utah State Senate election District 2
Party	Candidate	Votes	%	±%
Republican	Joe Jarvis	4,999	27.2	
Democratic	Scott McCoy	12,614	68.6	
