= Paula Julander =

American politician (1939–2025)

Member of the Utah State Senate from the 2nd district
- In office January 1, 2003 – February 2, 2005
- Preceded by: Alicia Suazo
- Succeeded by: Scott McCoy

Member of the Utah State Senate from the 1st district
- In office January 1, 1999 – January 1, 2003
- Preceded by: Robert C. Steiner
- Succeeded by: James Evans

Member of the Utah House of Representatives from the 24th district
- In office January 1, 1989 – January 1, 1993
- Preceded by: Olene Walker
- Succeeded by: Frank R. Pignanelli

Personal details
- Born: January 21, 1939 Charlotte, North Carolina, U.S.
- Died: August 25, 2025 (aged 86) Salt Lake City, Utah, U.S.
- Party: Democratic

Paula Julander (January 21, 1939 – August 25, 2025) was an American politician who served in the Utah House of Representatives from the 24th district from 1989 to 1993 and in the Utah State Senate from 1999 to 2005.

Julander died in Salt Lake City on August 25, 2025, at the age of 86.
