= Derek Phillips (footballer, born 1975) =

Trinidadian footballer

Personal information
- Date of birth: 9 April 1975 (age 51)
- Place of birth: Columbia, Maryland, United States
- Height: 1.80 m (5 ft 11 in)
- Position: Defender

College career
Years	Team	Apps	(Gls)
1994–1995	UMBC Retrievers		

Senior career*
Years	Team	Apps	(Gls)
1999	Maryland Mania	20	(1)
1999	→ Cocoa Expos (loan)		
2001	Derry City	6	(0)
2002	SV Wehen Wiesbaden	2	(0)
2003	TuRU Düsseldorf		
2003	Virginia Beach Mariners	1	(0)
2003–2005	Chesapeake Dragons		
2005	Shamrock Rovers	8	(0)

International career
2004–2005	Trinidad and Tobago	5	(0)
- * Club domestic league appearances and goals

Derek Phillips (born 9 April 1975) is an American-born Trinidadian retired footballer who played as a left-sided defender. He has been a member of the Trinidad and Tobago national team.

== Early life ==
Phillips grew up in Columbia, Maryland where he played for Soccer Association of Columbia (SAC). In 1993, he graduated from Atholton High School. He had played for Atholton HS his freshman season, then transferred to a school in Richmond for his sophomore and junior seasons. He returned to Atholton HS for his senior year. He attended University of Maryland, Baltimore County, playing on the men's soccer team in 1994 and 1995.

== Club career ==
Phillips played in Germany where he played for Eintracht Oberissingheim of the Oberliga. In May 1999, Phillips began the season with the Maryland Mania of the USL A-League. However, he also played on loan to the Cocoa Expos for several 1999 U.S. Open Cup games. In 2001, he joined Derry City FC. In July 2002, he went to SV Wehen Wiesbaden on a free transfer. In January 2002, he moved to TuRU Düsseldorf. In 2003, he played one game for the Virginia Beach Mariners of the USL A-League. He played for the Chesapeake Dragons from 2003 until 2005. He signed for Rovers in February 2005 and made 11 appearances.

== International career ==
Phillips' father, Lincoln Phillips, was born in Saint James, Trinidad and Tobago. He has represented Trinidad and Tobago on five occasions, making his senior international debut away to South Korea in on 14 July 2004. He is the son of former international goalkeeper Lincoln Phillips.

== Atholton High School ==
After Phillips' international debut, he became head coach of the men's varsity football team at Atholton High School. He would leave this position as coach in the 2023–2024 school year.

== See also ==
- Atholton High School
