= W. Rex Black =

American politician (1920–2012)

Wilford Rex Black (January 31, 1920 – December 12, 2012) was an American politician.

== Biography ==
Wilford Rex Black represented the 2nd Utah Senate District from 1973 to 1997. W. Rex Black, as he was often referred to, was a member of the Democratic party and represented the party as the Minority leader in the Utah Senate for many years.
