= Lincoln Phillips =

Trinidadian football player and manager

Personal information
- Date of birth: 4 July 1941 (age 85)
- Place of birth: Saint James, Trinidad and Tobago
- Height: 1.85 m (6 ft 1 in)
- Position: Goalkeeper

College career
Years	Team	Apps	(Gls)
1954–57	Burke's College		
1958–59	Queen's Royal College		

Senior career*
Years	Team	Apps	(Gls)
1960–1963	Maple		
1964–1967	Regiment		
1968	Baltimore Bays		
1969–1971	Washington Darts		
1972–1973	Baltimore Bays		
1974–1975	Baltimore Comets		
1975	Baltimore Comets (indoor)	1	(0)

International career
1965–1967	Trinidad and Tobago	7	(0)

Managerial career
- 1968–1970: Washington Darts
- 1970–1980: Howard Bison
- 1988–1989: Maryland Bays
- 1989–1994: VCU Rams
- * Club domestic league appearances and goals

Lincoln Phillips (born 4 July 1941) is a Trinidad and Tobago former footballer and soccer coach. He became the first black professional soccer coach in U.S. history in 1968 when he became the player/coach of the Washington Darts and he coached Howard University to two undefeated seasons and NCAA Championships.

Phillips was a goalkeeper for Trinidad and Tobago's national team from 1963 to 1967, and with them won a bronze medal in the 1967 Pan American Games.

He moved into American professional soccer, ending up with the Darts in 1969. That year he was the ASL's Coach of the Year and made the All-Star Team, while leading the team to the ASL Championship. In 1970, the team moved to the NASL and he was the league's top goalkeeper, setting NASL records for consecutive shutouts and consecutive minutes without allowing a goal, and made the All-Star Team again. That year the Darts had the best record and went to the Championship but lost it on a tiebreaker. He then left to become the full-time coach at Howard University, where the pay was better and they would allow him to go to classes for free.

In his first season with the Bison, Phillips led Howard to the school's first-ever NCAA final four in any sport. The Bison lost to UCLA, 4-3. In 1971, he coached Howard to the 1971 NCAA Division I championship in soccer, making Howard the first historically black college to win it. However, the NCAA stripped Howard of its title for player-eligibility violations. Phillips then led Howard to win the NCAA title again in 1974, a title which they retained. In both seasons he was named Coach of the year. He left Howard with an impressive 117-19-11 record, and took them to the NCAA tournament eight times. He also earned a Bachelor's and master's degrees in physical education from Howard by 1978.

Phillips left Howard in 1980 and then worked full-time for two years directing a local soccer camp before taking the position of athletic director at Newport Preparatory School in Kensington. During that time he was also a director of coaching for the Maryland State Youth Soccer Association for five years and a member of the U.S. Soccer Federation's national coaching staff. He then spent two seasons as the Head Coach/General Manager of the Maryland Bays of the ASL, coaching the team to the playoffs in the first season.

From 1989-1994 he was the head coach of Virginia Commonwealth's soccer team, leading them to a top twenty ranking. He also served as the U.S. National Team Goalkeeper Coach from 1992–94, helping the squad qualify for the 1994 World Cup. He then became a FIFA Staff Goalkeeper instructor from 1994-05, conducting coaching development workshops for FIFA in the Caribbean and Asia. He left that position to become the technical director for the Trinidad and Tobago football Federation from 2005-2012, helping them qualify for the 2006 World Cup in Germany. Then he became the goalkeeper coach for Loyola University's women's team.

He is the author of Goalkeeping: The Last Line of Defense: The First Line of Attack. He was once named the most outstanding goalkeeper in the Caribbean and Trinidad and Tobago's goalkeeper of the century.

== Personal life ==
Phillips' son, Derek Phillips, has also played for the Trinidad and Tobago national football team.
