= William H. Greene Stadium =

Howard University stadium in Washington, D.C.

Coordinates: 38.9255°N 77.0208°W

Greene Stadium

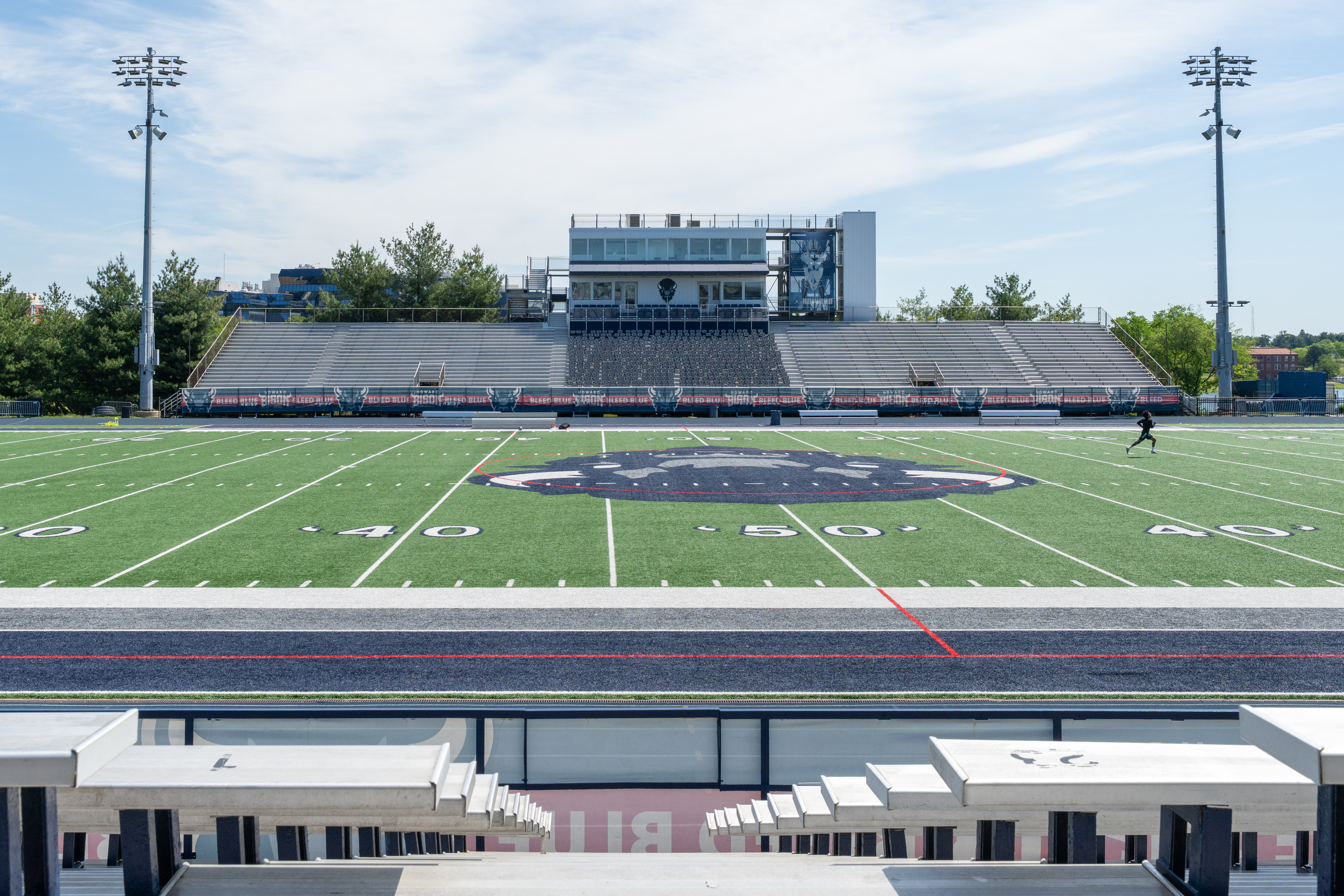
- Greene Stadium as seen in 2026
- Interactive map of Greene Stadium
- Full name: William H. Greene Stadium
- Former names: Howard Stadium (1926–1986)
- Address: 2400 6th Street Northwest; Washington, D.C. United States
- Owner: Howard University
- Operator: Howard Univ. Athletics
- Capacity: 10,000
- Type: Stadium
- Surface: Sprinturf artificial turf
- Current use: Football; Soccer; Lacrosse

Construction
- Groundbreaking: 1926
- Opened: 16 October 1926; 100 years ago

Tenants
- Howard Bison (NCAA) teams: football; men's and women's soccer; women's lacrosse

Website
- hubison.com/greene-stadium

Greene Stadium is a 7,086 seat (10,000 for football) multi-purpose stadium on the campus of Howard University in Washington, D.C., in the United States, which opened in 1926. It is home to the Howard Bison football, men's and women's soccer, and lacrosse teams.

Originally called "Howard Stadium", it was renamed "William H. Greene Stadium" in 1986 in honor of William H. Greene, M.D., a Washington, D.C., physician and Howard University benefactor.

== History ==
=== Howard Stadium ===
Where the stadium stands today was formerly a middle-class African-American neighborhood which was home to many Howard University faculty and workers. Howard University completed its new Howard Stadium in July 1926. The first football game played there was on October 16, 1926, against Morehouse College. Howard played games at both Howard Stadium, sometimes referred to as University Stadium, and nearby Griffith Stadium, where crowds of 17,000 to 20,000 people were common, from the 1920s into the 1950s. (Griffith Stadium was demolished in 1965.) Afterward, Howard University played most of its home games at Howard Stadium, which by 1972 could hold 5,000 fans. After playing a single game at Robert F. Kennedy Memorial Stadium every year from 1970 to 1973, Howard played every home game there in 1974 and 1975, all but one there in 1976, and half of them there in 1977.

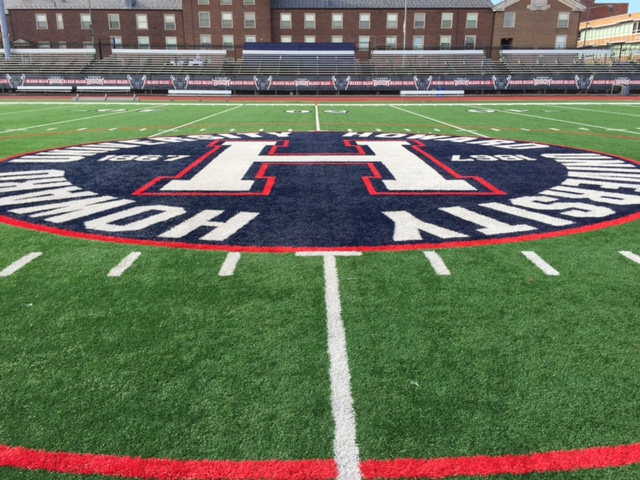
The Athletic Turf at Howard University

By 1977, Howard Stadium had been renovated and expanded to seat 9,000. That year, Howard University officials proposed constructing a 20,000-set stadium to replace the aging facility. Howard University officials admitted that Friday night football games did not draw large crowds, and the university could not get many Saturday afternoon games at RFK Stadium. (The Washington Redskins rented RFK Stadium, and a clause in their contract prohibited the playing of any game in the stadium 24 hours before a Redskins game.) In 1979, Howard University president James E. Cheek announced a plan to build a $14 million stadium and parking garage to replace Howard Stadium. The proposed stadium would seat 20,000. The university said it already had a design, and blueprints were being drafted. But nothing came of this plan. Though in 1985, after years of letting their field be known as the "dust bowl", the administration installed an astroturf field.

A decade later, Howard University officials announced an even more grandiose plan. In 1986, the university proposed constructing a 30,000-seat domed stadium. An office building, retail space, and more than 1,200 apartments would be built as part of a "Howard Plaza" project on 20 acres (81,000 m^{2}) of abandoned and dilapidated property next to the campus. The Howard Plaza project had a $150 million price tag. The stadium alone, which was designed to host football and basketball games, would cost $75 million. Although the plan had the support of city officials, critics of the plan noted that Howard's football games only drew about 4,000 to 7,000 attendees. Residents of nearby LeDroit Park also opposed the plan.

=== William H. Greene Stadium ===
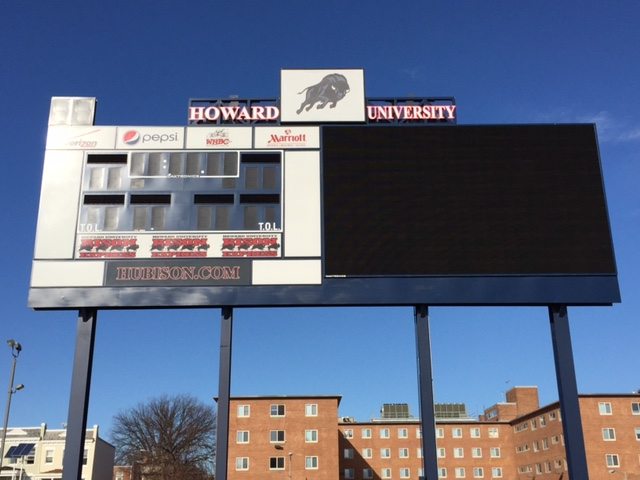
Scoreboard

Nothing came of the 1986 domed stadium plan. Instead, Howard Stadium was renovated in early 1986, and renamed William H. Greene Stadium. The project took 6 months and was dedicated in front of a homecoming game crowd of 18,635 on Oct 11, 1986. As of 2011, the team still played on an artificial surface. A track surrounds the playing field. In 1990, Howard University officials proposed to expand Greene Stadium by 6,000 seats in 1991 season. The plans called for enclosing the north end of the stadium, and moving the scoreboard to the south end. This would provide the stadium with a total of 14,000 seats, enabling the university to sell season tickets because it could guarantee preferential seating. By 2010, however, Greene Stadium still had not been expanded or renovated.

In a review of D.C. area stadiums in 2013, Brett Fuller, director of business development at the architectural firm AECOM, heavily criticized Greene Stadium for looking more like a high school field than a major college football stadium. As for the need for renovation, Fuller said, "It's hard to say it's in bad shape. It hardly exists at all."

== See also ==
- List of NCAA Division I FCS football stadiums
