= Batería de Zuazo =

Coordinates: 36°28′11″N 6°11′7″W

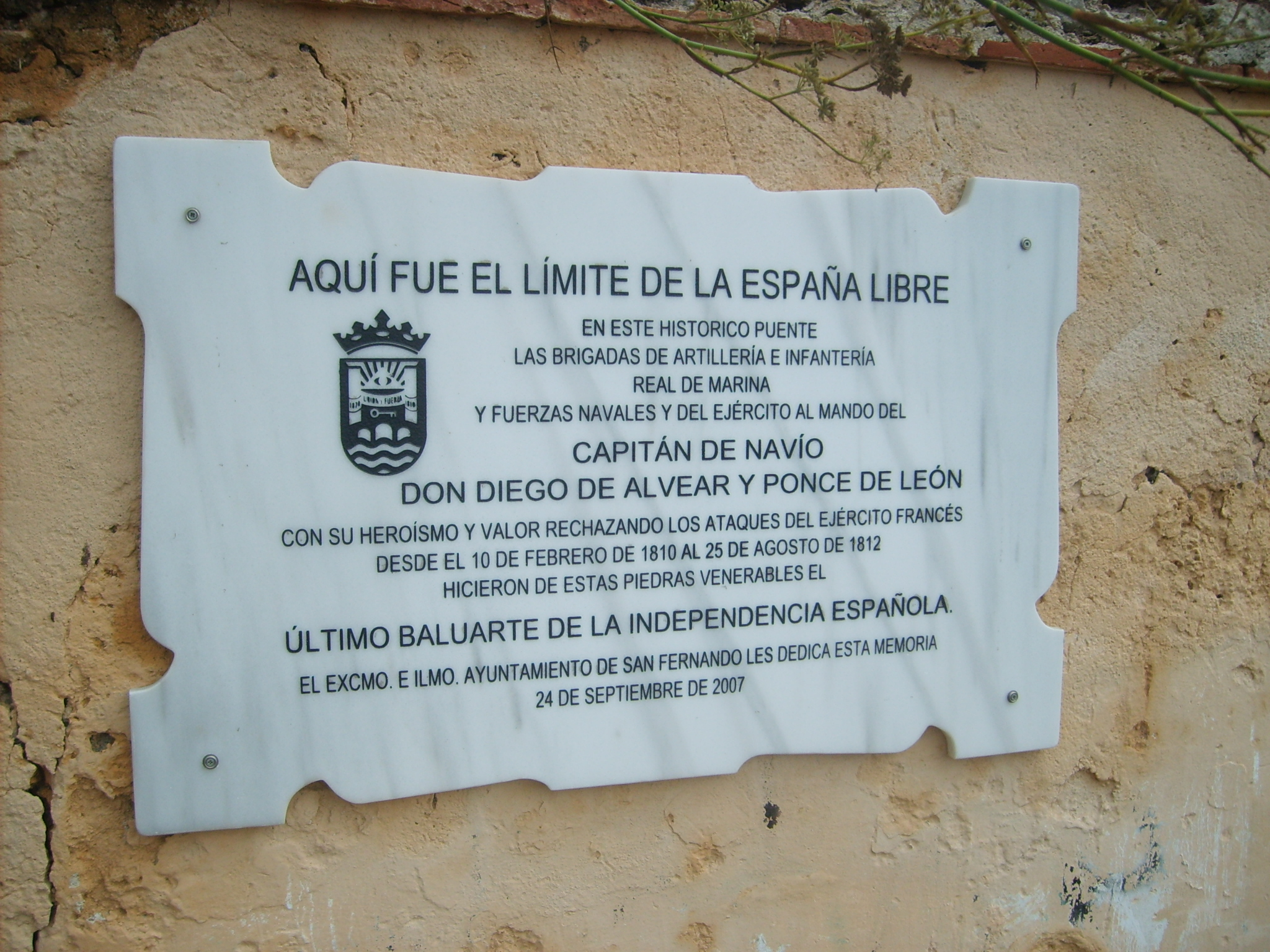
Plaque commemorating the defence of San Fernando (10 February - 1810 - 25 August 1812 )

Batería de Zuazo is a battery located in San Fernando in the Province of Cádiz, Andalusia, Spain. It was built by Felipe II to help defend the Isla de León. It was protected under the general declaration of the Decree of April 22 of 1949 and Law 16/1985 by the Patrimonio Histórico Españo (Spanish Historical Heritage) and the Junta de Andalucía of 1993.
