= Leonel Suazo =

Honduran footballer

Personal information
- Full name: Amílcar Leonel Suazo
- Place of birth: Honduras
- Position: Forward

Senior career*
Years	Team	Apps	(Gls)
1982–1988	Motagua		(17)
1988–1990	Washington Diplomats		
1994	Washington Mustangs	12	(17)
- * Club domestic league appearances and goals

Amílcar Leonel Suazo is a retired Honduran association football forward who played professionally in Honduras and the United States.

From 1982 to 1988, Suazo played for F.C. Motagua. In 1988, he moved to the United States and signed with the Washington Diplomats of the American Soccer League. He scored six league goals that season as the Diplomats won the league title. Suazo remained with the Diplomats in 1989 and 1990. In 1990, the team played in the American Professional Soccer League. In 1994, Suazo played for the Washington Mustangs in the USISL. He was the eighth leading goal scorer that season.
