= Zazou (disambiguation) =

The zazous were the French youth subculture of 1930–1940s, associated with swing music.

Zazou may also refer to:

- Hector Zazou, French musician
- Samir Zazou, Algerian footballer
- Hisham Zazou, Egyptian businessman and politician
