= Phillip Gyau =

American soccer player and coach (born 1966)

Personal information
- Full name: Phillinoisip Gyau
- Date of birth: February 7, 1966 (age 60)
- Place of birth: Silver Spring, Maryland, United States
- Height: 6 ft 0 in (1.83 m)
- Position: Forward

College career
Years	Team	Apps	(Gls)
1982–1985	Howard Bison		

Senior career*
Years	Team	Apps	(Gls)
1985	Club España		
1988	Washington Diplomats		
1989–1991	Maryland Bays		
1992	Tampa Bay Rowdies	16	(7)
1993	Colorado Foxes	8	(1)
1993	Los Angeles Salsa	17	(1)
1994	Montreal Impact	8	(1)
1994–1995	Baltimore Blast (indoor)	1	(0)
1995	Washington Warthogs (indoor)	28	(8)

International career
1989–1991	United States	6	(0)
1997–2006	United States (beach)		

Managerial career
- 1998–2002: United States (beach)
- 2014–: Howard Bison
- * Club domestic league appearances and goals

Phillinoisip "Phillip" Gyau (born February 7, 1966) is an American professional soccer coach and former player who played as a forward. He is the head coach of the Howard Bison men's team.

Gyau spent his outdoor playing career in the American Soccer League and the American Professional Soccer League, his indoor career with the Washington Warthogs and Baltimore Blast.

He earned six caps with the United States national team and spent nine years with the United States national beach soccer team.

== Early life and career ==
The son of Joseph Agyemang-Gyau, a member of the Ghana national team, Gyau was born in Silver Spring, Maryland and grew up in Maryland after his father signed with the Washington Darts of the North American Soccer League (NASL).

Gyau attended Gwynn Park High School in Brandywine, Maryland from 1978 to 1982. After graduating from high school, he attended Howard University where he played on the men's soccer team from 1982 to 1985.

== Club career ==
=== Club España ===
In 1985, he played for Club España of Washington, D.C., when it won the National Amateur Cup.

=== Washington Diplomats ===
In 1988, Gyau signed with the Washington Diplomats of the American Soccer League (ASL).

=== Maryland Bays ===
He moved to the Maryland Bays in 1989 and played three seasons with them. In the spring of 1990, the ASL merged with the Western Soccer League to create the American Professional Soccer League (APSL). In 1990, Gyau was a first team All Star and the APSL MVP while scoring twelve goals with the Bays.

=== Tampa Bay Rowdies ===
The Bays folded at the end of the 1991 season and Gyau moved to the Tampa Bay Rowdies. He scored seven goals in sixteen games with the Rowdies in 1992.

=== Colorado Foxes and Los Angeles Salsa ===
He moved to the Colorado Foxes for the 1993 season. However, he moved from Colorado to the Los Angeles Salsa after eight games. That year, the Foxes and the Salsa met in the APSL title game. Gyau scored the first goal of the game, but the Foxes tied it late and won in overtime.

=== Montreal Impact ===
In 1994, Gyau was with the Montreal Impact.

=== Baltimore Blast ===
In 1995, Gyau moved back to Washington, D.C., to sign with the Baltimore Blast of the MISL.

=== Washington Warthogs ===
He played only one game, then moved to the Washington Warthogs of the Continental Indoor Soccer League (CISL). He spent at least two seasons with the Warthogs.

== International career ==
Gyau earned his first cap with the United States national team in a June 4, 1989 win over Peru. He played a handful of games through the rest of 1989, then two games in 1990. His last game with the national team came in an October 19, 1991 loss to North Korea.

Gyau began playing beach soccer beginning in 1997, including nine years as the captain of the United States national beach soccer team.

== Coaching career ==
In 1998, Gyau became the head coach of the United States national beach soccer team, a position he held until 2002. In 2003, he became the head coach of the Bullis School's girls' soccer team. In his three years as coach, he took the team to a 26–28–2 record.

He has also coached various youth teams, including the Bethesda Fury, with which he won three state and one regional championship; the Bethesda Eclipse, winner of four state and one regional championship. He is on staff with the D.C. United as its U-13 boys' head coach.

He is also the founder and director of Next Level Development, a soccer development program.

He is the St. Johns College High School varsity coach in Washington, D.C.

He also coached other teams, one of them being the Olney Pumas U-16 team in the NCSL league.

Since that time he has been coaching MSC Revolution, a rising U-17 boys' soccer team which he was one both NCSL Division 1 with, as well as the Bethesda Tournament, helping to rank the team 3rd in the state of Maryland.
