= Zauzou =

Zauzou may refer to:

- Nu people or Zauzou
- Zauzou language
