= Elvis Comrie =

English-American footballer (born 1959)

Personal information
- Date of birth: 7 September 1959 (age 67)
- Place of birth: Bristol, England
- Position: Forward

Youth career
- Kingsford Rangers
- 1979–1981: University of Connecticut

Senior career*
Years	Team	Apps	(Gls)
1981–1982	Montreal Manic (indoor)	3	(0)
1982–1983	Montreal Manic	33	(11)
1984	Chicago Sting (indoor)	16	(2)
1983–1984	Chicago Sting	22	(5)
1984–1985	New York Cosmos (indoor)	28	(2)
1986–1987	Chicago Shoccers (indoor)	40	(37)
1988	Maryland Bays	?	(3)
1989–1990	Albany Capitals	?	(15)

International career
1984	United States	4	(0)

Managerial career
- 1989–1990: Central Connecticut State (assistant)
- 1991–2008: Holy Cross
- 2012–2012: Worcester Hydra
- * Club domestic league appearances and goals

Elvis Comrie (born 7 September 1959) is an English-American former football player and coach. A forward, he played three seasons in the North American Soccer League, one in Major Indoor Soccer League, one in the American Indoor Soccer Association, two in the American Soccer League and one in the American Professional Soccer League. Comrie earned four caps with the U.S. national team in 1984. Comrie worked briefly as a stockbroker and was formerly a college soccer coach, primarily at Holy Cross. He was also the head coach of the Worcester Hydra of the USL Premier Development League in 2012.

== Playing career ==
=== Youth and college ===
Comrie was born in England to Jamaican parents. He was named after Elvis Presley. He played for both his school team, the Bristol Boys and his club team, the Kingsford Rangers, part of the Bristol City club system. When he was ten, Comrie's father moved to the U.S. where he settled in Brooklyn and worked to bring over his family. Comrie continued to live in Bristol where Rovers offered Comrie a contract when he was twelve. Comrie's father refused to allow his son to sign with the club, insisting Comrie continue with school. Soon after, the Comrie family moved to Bedford-Stuyvesant a particularly harsh neighborhood in Brooklyn to join his father. Comrie attended Fort Hamilton High School where he continued to play soccer.

After high school, Comrie entered the University of Connecticut where he majored in home economics and played on the powerhouse Huskies soccer team from 1979 to 1982. The Huskies won the 1981 NCAA Championship. Comrie was named a second team All-American in 1981 and finished second on career points list with 145. While Comrie finished his collegiate career in 1982, he did not graduate with a bachelor's degree in fashion design until 1986.

=== Professional ===
In 1982, the Montreal Manic of the North American Soccer League (NASL) drafted Comrie. That season, he was runner-up to fellow UConn teammate Pedro DeBrito for Rookie of the Year. The Manic folded at the end of the 1983 NASL season and Comrie moved to the Chicago Sting for the 1984 season. The Sting won the 1984 NASL championship. The NASL folded after the 1984 season and several of the league's teams, including the Sting, jumped to the Major Indoor Soccer League (MISL). However, the Sting traded him to the New York Cosmos. While the Cosmos began the 1984–1985 season, they folded after the All Star break. In 1986, Comrie joined the Chicago Shoccers of the American Indoor Soccer Association (AISA). The Shoccers folded at the end of the 1986–1987 season. Comrie retired from playing and became a stockbroker. On 19 October 1987, now known as Black Monday, Comrie suffered significant losses, as he found he had not diversified his investments properly, placing large bets on instruments that inevitably collapsed. This led to a re-evaluation of his career and his return to soccer.

At the age of 27, Comrie left his stockbroker career and went to France for a try out where he spent six months playing for Montpellier HSC. He played alongside Carlos Valderrama and Roger Milla; however, he eventually came back to the United States where he began his coaching career at the Central Connecticut State University as an assistant to fellow Englishman Shaun Green but was later offered a head coach position at Holly Cross University where he coached for the following 18 years.

In 1988, he signed with the Maryland Bays of the American Soccer League (ASL). He was a first team All Star. He moved to the Albany Capitals for the 1989 and 1990 seasons. In 1991, he retired from playing professionally for a second time, this time permanently, to enter the coaching ranks.

=== International ===
In 1984, Comrie earned four caps with the United States men's national soccer team. His first game with the national team came in a scoreless tie with Italy on 30 May 1984. While he started the game, he came off for Michael Fox. He then played three games in October with his last national team game coming on 17 October 1984 in a 2–1 loss to Mexico. He replaced Steve Sharp at halftime.

== Coaching career ==
Comrie gained his first coaching job as an assistant at Central Connecticut State University through an old friend, Shaun Green, the head coach at the university. In 1991, was hired as the head coach of Holy Cross. This position was not a full-time job until 1996. Comrie finished with a career record of 125–158–34. He holds many school coaching records including most wins and most losses. On 24 December 2008, Comrie resigned as the head coach at Holy Cross after the NCAA uncovered massive recruiting violations.

=== NCAA violations ===
In 2008, Comrie resigned when a pattern of NCAA rules violations was revealed. According to the NCAA, Comrie made more than 300 impermissible phone calls to several prospective student-athletes, many before the contact period and others that exceeded weekly limits.

An investigative committee also found that the school failed to monitor the program as a whole, and in these specific instances, failed to have adequate systems in place to monitor recruiting phone calls. Additionally, Comrie was cited for failing to "promote an atmosphere of rules compliance." Comrie resigned at the end of the 2008 season after 18 years at Holy Cross. He was effectively banned from coaching an NCAA as a result.

== Worcester Hydra ==
On 6 March 2012, Comrie was appointed manager of USL Premier Development League team, Worcester Hydra, for their inaugural season. The team has since folded.

He was inducted into the Connecticut Hall of Fame in 2005.
