= Darrell Green Youth Life Foundation =

The Darrell Green Youth Life Foundation (DGYLF) is a faith-based 501(c)(3) organization started by former Washington Redskins cornerback Darrell Green. The Foundation's stated mission is to "help children develop into leaders who positively influence their families and communities". Specifically, the Foundation runs after-school and summer programs for elementary school age children that focus academics, friendship, and values. The DGYLF has no formal relationship with the local public school system, but focuses on teaching children age 5 to 11 in reading, writing, math, and English. Funding for their activities comes from other foundations, corporations, individuals, churches, the government, and special events.
