= Club España =

Club España was an American soccer team which won the National Challenge Cup in 1987. The team also won the 1985 National Amateur Cup. The team ceased operations in 1987 when head coach Hugo Berly and most of the players moved to the newly formed Washington Diplomats.
