= 1971 NCAA soccer tournament =

1971 College Cup

Tournament details
- Country: United States
- Venue(s): Miami Orange Bowl; Miami, Florida
- Teams: 24

Final positions
- Champions: Howard (vacated)
- Runners-up: Saint Louis
- Semifinalists: Harvard; San Francisco

Tournament statistics
- Matches played: 23
- Goals scored: 98 (4.26 per match)

Awards
- Best player: Mike Seerey, Saint Louis (offensive)

The 1971 NCAA soccer tournament was the 13th annual tournament organized by the National Collegiate Athletic Association to determine the national champion of men's college soccer among its members in the United States. This was the final championship before the establishment of separate championships for the NCAA's University Division (now Division I) and College Division (now Divisions II and III) in 1972.

The final match was played at the Miami Orange Bowl in Miami, Florida on December 30.

Howard initially won their first national title—defeating two-time defending champion Saint Louis, 3–2, in the championship game—but the Bison's title would later be vacated by the NCAA on disputed player eligibility grounds. The championship was not re-awarded.

== Qualifying ==
Two teams made their debut appearances in the NCAA soccer tournament: Chico State and Cornell.

== Bracket ==
First round
Harvard	6
Southern Connecticut State	0
Brown	4
Bridgeport	1
Hartwick College	3
Army	0
Cornell	2
Long Island	1
Howard	1
West Virginia	0
Navy	3
South Florida	1
Penn	2
East Stroudsburg State	0
Penn State	4
Saint Joseph's	1

Second round
Harvard	3
Brown	1
Hartwick College	4
Cornell	1
Howard	3
Navy	0
Penn	1
Penn State	2
Saint Louis	4
Ohio	0
SIU Edwardsville	2
Akron	0
San Francisco	3
San Jose State	2
UCLA	5
Chico State	2

Quarterfinals
Harvard	4
Hartwick College	1
Howard	8
Penn State	0
Saint Louis	3
SIU Edwardsville	1
San Francisco	6
UCLA	2

Semifinals
Harvard	0
Howard	1
Saint Louis	3
San Francisco	2

Championship
Howard	3†
Saint Louis	2

== Final ==
December 5, 1970

Howard*	3–2 (a.e.t.)	Saint Louis

Miami Orange Bowl, Miami, Florida
Attendance: 5,800

The Championship was later vacated by the NCAA on the grounds that two Howard players had played amateur soccer in Trinidad, exhausting their eligibility, and that two others had not taken entrance exams, required by the NCAA, to predict a grade point average of at least 1.6. Howard University argued that the eligibility rules were vague and discriminated against foreigners, and that the players had all maintained grade-point averages of 3.0 or higher in college, but the NCAA did not reverse the ruling.

== See also ==
- 1971 NAIA Soccer Championship
