= Puente Zuazo =

Historic bridge in San Fernando, Spain

Coordinates: 36°28′8″N 6°11′0″W

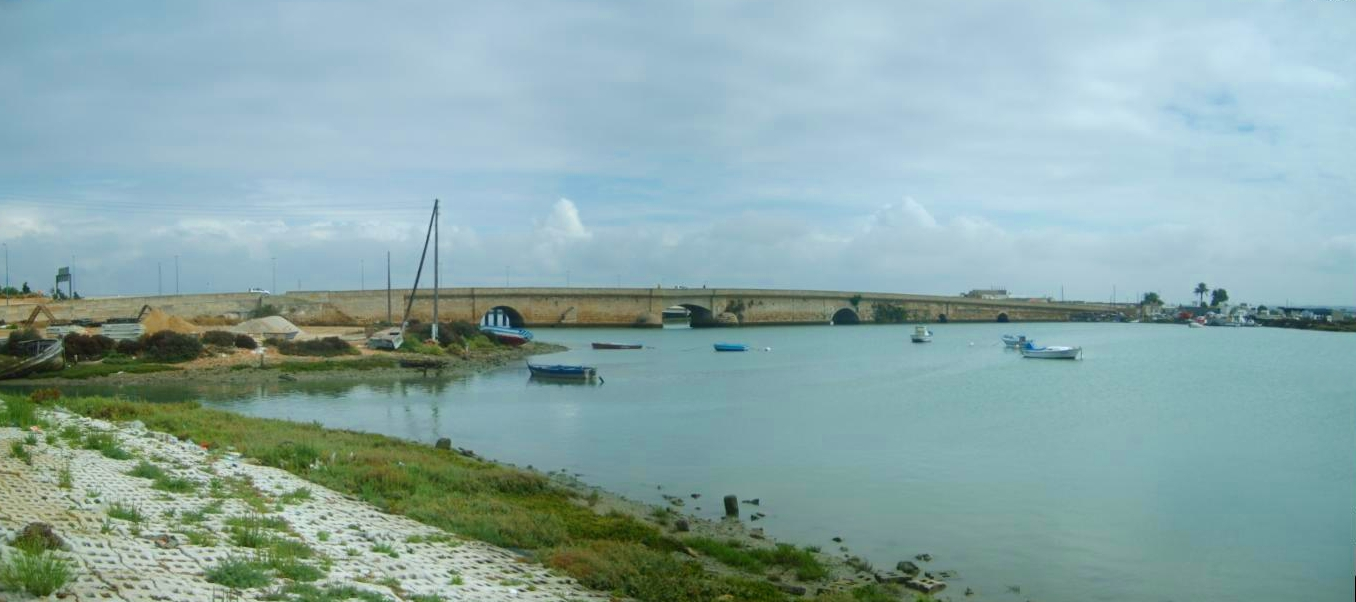

Puente Zuazo is a bridge located in San Fernando in the Province of Cádiz, Andalusia, Spain. The original bridge was built in 1411. This historic bridge has been the scene of important battles in the history of Spain, such as the looting by the British or the surging by Napoleon's troops. It has undergone significant changes over the years. Currently it has a length of 350 metres (1,150 ft) and a width of 10 metres (33 ft).
