= Keith Aqui =

Trinidad and Tobago footballer

Keith Anthony Aqui
Personal information
- Date of birth: August 5, 1945
- Place of birth: Trinidad and Tobago
- Date of death: 5 November 2016 (aged 71)
- Place of death: Washington, DC
- Position: Forward

Youth career
- 1968–1971: Howard University

Senior career*
Years	Team	Apps	(Gls)
1973	Baltimore Bays		
1974–1975	Baltimore Comets	39	(15)
1975	Baltimore Comets (indoor)	2	(1)
1976	San Diego Jaws	14	(1)

International career
- Trinidad and Tabogo
- * Club domestic league appearances and goals

Keith Aqui was a Trinidad association football forward who played professionally in the American Soccer League and the North American Soccer League. He earned an unknown number of caps with the Trinidad and Tobago national football team.

From 1965 to 1967, Aqui attended Mausica Teachers College in Trinidad. He then entered Howard University, where he played on the men’s soccer team from 1970 to 1972. He was a 1970 second team All American and a 1971 first team All American. In 1971, Aqui and his teammates won the NCAA Men's Soccer Championship. He was inducted into the Howard University Athletic Hall of Fame in 1996. Aqui became a central part of a Howard University lawsuit against the NCAA when the NCAA declared him retroactively ineligible after the 1971 college soccer season based on his attendance at Mausica. As a result, the NCAA voided Howard’s 1971 NCAA championship. Howard sued the NCAA, but the United States Court of Appeals, District of Columbia Circuit ruled in favor of the NCAA.

In February 1973, the Dallas Tornado selected Aqui in the first round (sixth overall) of the North American Soccer League draft. The Tornado released him in the pre-season and he joined the Baltimore Bays of the American Soccer League. In 1974, Aqui signed with the Baltimore Comets of the North American Soccer League. In 1976, the Comets moved to San Diego where the team was renamed the San Diego Jaws. Aqui played an unknown number of games with the Trinidad and Tobago national football team during the 1970s.

Later in life, he became an attorney with the U.S. Department of Treasury. He died on November 11, 2016, survived by his wife and three children.
