= Hugo Berly =

Chilean footballer (1941-2009)

Personal information
- Full name: Hugo Nelson Berly Silva
- Date of birth: December 31, 1941
- Place of birth: Santiago, Chile
- Date of death: December 24, 2009 (aged 67)
- Place of death: Washington, D.C., U.S.
- Height: 1.70 m (5 ft 7 in)
- Position: Right-back

Youth career
- Manuel Montt
- Picton Lennox
- Santiago Wanderers

Senior career*
Years	Team	Apps	(Gls)
1960–1963	Santiago Wanderers		
1964–1970	Audax Italiano		
1971–1977	Unión Española	118	(3)

International career
1967–1974	Chile	12	(0)

Managerial career
- 1981–1982: Audax Italiano
- * Club domestic league appearances and goals

Hugo Nelson Berly Silva (December 31, 1941 – December 24, 2009) was a Chilean footballer who played as a right-back.

== Career ==
Berly played for Unión Española, Audax Italiano and Santiago Wanderers in the domestic championship of Chile. He also represented the Chile national team making 12 appearances. His international debut was in a 1–0 friendly victory against Argentina on 15 August 1967. He was also part of the Chile squad in the 1966 World Cup, without featuring in the tournament.

On 6 April 1965, Berly was one of the constituent footballers of SIFUP, the trade union of professionales footballers in Chile, alongside fellows such as Pedro Araya, Manuel Astorga, Juan Rodríguez Vega, among others.

== Personal life ==
Berly had a wife and two daughters. He died aged 67 on December 24, 2009 in Washington, D.C., United States.

== Honours ==
Unión Española

- Chilean Primera División 1973, 1975, 1977
