= Alicia Suazo =

American politician

Member of the Utah Senate from the 2nd district
- In office 2001–2002
- Preceded by: Pete Suazo
- Succeeded by: Paula Julander

Personal details
- Party: Democratic
- Spouse: Pete Suazo
- Occupation: teacher

Alicia Suazo was a member of the Utah State Senate from 2001 to 2002.

Suazo was born in Tooele, Utah. She received a bachelor's degree from the University of Utah and worked as a teacher in the Salt Lake City school district. She married Pete Suazo who was first elected to the state legislature in 1992.

When her husband died in a four-wheeling accident in 2001, Suazo was appointed to finish out his state senate term.

== Sources ==
- Utah Women and Families awards list
