= Al Henderson =

Trinidadian footballer (born 1950)

Personal information
- Full name: Alvin Henderson
- Date of birth: 24 September 1950 (age 76)
- Place of birth: Trinidad
- Position: Forward

Youth career
- 1969–72: Howard University

Senior career*
Years	Team	Apps	(Gls)
1974–75	Baltimore Comets	36	(16)
1975	Baltimore Comets (indoor)	2	(4)
- * Club domestic league appearances and goals

Al Henderson (born 24 September 1950) is a Trinidadian retired soccer forward who played two seasons in the North American Soccer League.

Henderson was born in Trinidad, the son of a soccer referee who taught Henderson the sport. Henderson went to England at age nine, spending three years there and continuing his athletic development. He then returned to Trinidad, attending high school at St Mary's College. While playing in Trinidad, Henderson was noticed by Howard University coach Lincoln "Tiger" Phillips, who recommended the university recruit him. Henderson thus attended Howard, where he was a 1970 and 1971 first team All American and a 1972 second team All American. He was inducted into the Howard University Hall of Fame in 1998. In 1974, Henderson signed with the Baltimore Comets of the North American Soccer League (NASL). He spent two seasons with the Comets.

He has served as the Trinidad Minister of Sport.
