= James E. Cheek =

President emeritus of Howard University

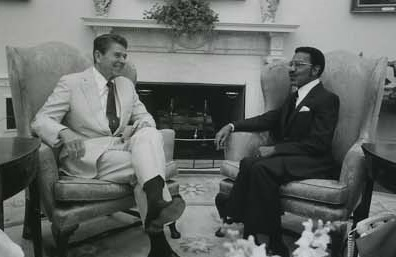
- Cheek with Ronald Reagan in 1981
- Born: James Edward Cheek; December 4, 1932; Roanoke Rapids, North Carolina, U.S.
- Died: January 8, 2010 (aged 77); Greensboro, North Carolina, U.S.
- Education: Shaw University, 1955 (BA); Colgate Rochester Crozer Divinity School, 1958 (M.Div.); Drew University, 1962 (Ph.D.)
- Occupations: educator, scholar, theologian, public speaker, humanitarian
- Years active: 1958–2010
- Spouse: Celestine (m. 1958)
- Children: 2
- Awards: Presidential Medal of Freedom

James Edward Cheek (December 4, 1932 – January 8, 2010) was president of Howard University from 1968 to 1989. He was born in Roanoke Rapids, North Carolina.

== Howard University President (1968–1989) ==
In 1989, Cheek appointed Republican National Committee Chairman Lee Atwater as a member of the Howard University Board of Trustees. Students rose up in protest against Atwater's appointment, disrupting Howard's 122nd anniversary celebrations, and eventually occupied the university's administration building. Within days, both Atwater and Cheek resigned.

== Personal life ==
Cheek was married to the former Celestine Williams, and had two children. He died on January 8, 2010, from complications of coronary artery disease and chronic obstructive pulmonary disease.
