= Pete Suazo =

American politician

Pete Suazo (died August 2001) was the first Hispanic Utah State Senator.

Suazo was born and raised in Salt Lake City. He graduated from the University of Utah. Suazo was first elected to the Utah State House of Representatives in 1992 and to the Utah State Senate in 1996. After his death, his widow, Alicia Suazo, completed his term of office through January 2003.

== Sources ==
- University of Utah biography of Suazo
