= Washington Diplomats (1988–1990) =

American soccer team

The Washington Diplomats were an American soccer team established in 1987 which played in the American Soccer League in 1988 and 1989 and the American Professional Soccer League in 1990.

== History ==
Established in 1987 as an independent team, the Diplomats, owned by Julio Pinon, drew many of their players, and head coach Hugo Berly, from Club España. The newly formed Diplomats won the inaugural and only Ambassador Cup when they tied the Honduras national football team in June. In April 1988, the team entered the newly established American Soccer League. At the time, Ian Bain had been hired as an interim head coach. On May 6, 1988, Berly returned as head coach with the team at 2–3. He quickly revamped the Diplomats roster, bringing in Philip Gyau and Jean Harbor who were instrumental in taking the team to the ASL title that season. The Diplomats began the 1989 American Soccer League season well, but lost team-leading scorer Harbor for a month to suspension after he broke Pedro Magallanes jaw. The Dips finished just out of playoff contention. For the 1990 season, the league merged with the Western Soccer Alliance to form the American Professional Soccer League. The Diplomats finished the 1990 season with the lowest number of points in the APSL Eastern Conference. In October 1990, the league terminated the Diplomats because the team was facing significant financial difficulties at the time.

=== Year-by-year ===
Year	Division	League	Regular season	Playoffs	U.S. Open Cup
1988	N/A	ASL	10-10, 2nd, Southern	Champion	Did not enter
1989	N/A	ASL	11-9, 3rd, Southern	Did not qualify	Did not enter
1990	Southern	APSL	5-15; 5th, ASL Southern	Did not qualify	Did not enter

== Honors ==
- ASL Champions (1): 1989
- Participations in CONCACAF Champions' Cup: 1988

=== Coaches ===
- Hugo Berly (1987)
- Ian Bain (1988 - interim)
- Hugo Berly (1988)
- John Ellinger (1989)
- Stojan Nikolic (1990)
