= Pellegrino (surname) =

Pellegrino is an Italian surname. Notable people with the surname include:

- Adriano Pellegrino (born 1984), Australian football player
- Aline Pellegrino (born 1982), Brazilian football player
- Amahl Pellegrino (born 1990), Norwegian football player of Tanzanian descent
- Andrea Pellegrino (born 1997), Italian tennis player
- Charles R. Pellegrino (born 1953), American author
- Christine Pellegrino, American politician
- Danny Pellegrino, American podcaster, writer
- Edmund Pellegrino, American, chairman of the President's Council on Bioethics
- Federico Pellegrino (born 1990), Italian cross-country skier
- Fernando Pellegrino (born 1986), Argentine football player
- Frank Pellegrino (actor) (1944–2017), American actor
- Frank Pellegrino (inventor) (1923–2008), president of General Fibre Company and plastic molding machine inventor.
- Frank P. Pellegrino (19031–1975), philanthropist and former president and chairman of International Hat Company
- Giovanni Pellegrino (born 1939), Italian politician
- Itala Pellegrino (1865–?), Italian painter
- Kurt Pellegrino (born 1979), American mixed martial artist
- Loraine B. Pellegrino, listed as secretary for Arizona on false slate of Trump electors
- Marco Pellegrino (born 2002), Argentine football player
- Mark Pellegrino (born 1965), American actor
- Mateo Pellegrino (born 2001), Argentine football player
- Mauricio Pellegrino (born 1971), Argentine football player
- Maximiliano Pellegrino (born 1980), Argentine football player
- Michele Pellegrino (1903–1986), Italian archbishop
- Nicky Pellegrino (born 1964), English-born New Zealand novelist
- Patrizia Pellegrino (born 1962), Italian actress
- San Danielo da Pellegrino (ca. 1480-1545), Italian painter
- Teresa Pellegrino (born 1975), Italian chemist, academic
- Vincenzo Pellegrino, English actor
