= Frank Pellegrino =

Frank Pellegrino may refer to:

- Frank P. Pellegrino (1901–1975), American businessman and philanthropist
- Frank Pellegrino (inventor) (1923–2008), American engineer, inventor, and industrialist
- Frank Pellegrino (actor) (1944–2017), American actor and restaurateur
- Frank George Pellegrino Sr. (1923–2008), American engineer
