= Cerisano =

- Comune
- Comune di Cerisano
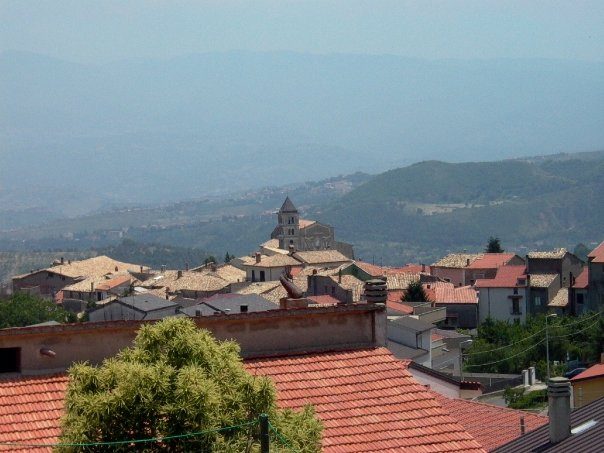

- Location within Italy Location within Calabria
- Coordinates: 39°17′N 16°11′E
- Country: Italy
- Region: Calabria
- Province: Cosenza (CS)
- Frazioni: Codicina, Cozzo del Monte, Manche, Pianetto, Valli

Government
  - Mayor: Lucio Di Gioia

Area
  - Total: 15.19 km^{2} (5.86 sq mi)
- Elevation: 650 m (2,130 ft)

Population (2007)
  - Total: 3,275
  - Density: 215.6/km^{2} (558.4/sq mi)
- Demonym: Cerisanesi
- Time zone: UTC+1 (CET)
  - Summer (DST): UTC+2 (CEST)
- Postal code: 87044
- Dialing code: 0984
- Patron saint: St. Lawrence
- Saint day: 10 August
- Website: Official website

Cerisano is a town and comune in the province of Cosenza in the Calabria region of southern Italy.

== History ==
According to some hypotheses, the town was founded by the Oenotrians, around the fifteenth century BC. In this account, Cerisano would have been known to the Greeks as the Citerium, Citerion.

The first surviving written records mentioning Cerisano date back to 1247. In the feudal period, Cerisano was under the jurisdiction of various lords. Later, under the rule of Louis III of Anjou, there was a brief period of autonomy when Cerisano was owned by the De Matera, followed by the Sanseverino family of Bisignano. The latter transformed Cerisano into a military outpost. In 1489, the comune was entrusted to Royal Captain Gaspare Firrao, from Cosenza, and then to Bernardino de Marinis Gragnano.

In 1490, Bernardino Sanseverino regained possession of the town. In 1519, with the death of Bernardino, his son Pierantonio succeeded him to lead the comune. During the French invasion, he tried unsuccessfully to defend the town from the army that marched from Cosenza. Cerisano was then occupied for a short period until the French army was defeated. In 1528, the country was hit by a famine that killed two-thirds of the population. In the second half of the 16th century began the decline of the ruling Sanseverino family. The Sanseverinos sold Cerisano to Don Pietro Gonzales de Mendoza who entrusted its management to his wife Eleonora Sanseverino.

In 1572, the ownership of the estate passed to Valerio Telesio, brother of philosopher Bernardino Telesio. In 1567, Valerio was accused of heresy, a crime punishable by the death penalty. However, with the help of Cardinal William Sirleto, he escaped conviction. He was, however, killed on August 10, 1579, in the church of San Giovanni, in Castelfranco (now called Castrolibero). The estate was then inherited by his son Roberto Telesio, who contracted large debts in 1583 and was forced to sell the estate to Horace Sersale, who married Clarice Telesio, sister of Roberto. On the death of Horace in 1594 the estate passed to his son Hannibal, after a formal request to the authority. On November 25, 1613, he obtained the title of Duke of Cerisano. After the Duke's death, the estate passed to his son, also named Hannibal, which then followed to the brothers Giulio and Geronimo Sersale.

Geronimo Sersale was named prince and duke of Cerisano in 1657 and married Portia Sanseverino of Calvera. The marriage produced twins Horace and Diego. The family decided that Horace would inherit the estate and titles with the consent of his brother, and that the latter would be entitled to receive a monthly income. During the early 18th century, Cerisano's economic situation had deteriorated. In 1758, Prince Domenico Sersale, another son of Geronimo Sersale, ordered the property entrusted to the notary Lorenzo Zupo, who continued to administer Cerisano even after the death of the Prince. Throughout the late 18th and 19th Cerisano largely remained under the administration of the Zupo family.

== Main sights ==
The Old Town of Cerisano lies at the foot of the Palazzo Sersale, with the town square in front, including an acropolis that dominates the village. Churches in Cerisano include San Lorenzo, martyr St. Ugolino of San Domenico, the Carmine, Santa Maria degli Angeli, the convent the Reformed (Oasi S. Antonio), the Madonna of Schiucchi, and St. John the Baptist.

Other sights are the Sersale Palace, Palazzo Zupi, Greek Casino, War Memorials, and Villa Zupi.

== Events ==
In late August and early September, Cerisano holds the Festival of Serre. During the festival, various sections of the town are dedicated to cinema, jazz, theater, classical music, visual arts, and cultural events.

== People ==
- Frank P. Pellegrino, CEO International Hat Company and philanthropist

== Sources ==
- Luigi Bilotto, Cerisano, Roma, Palombi Editori, 1999.
- Carlo Zupi, La storia di Cerisano, Marano e Castelfranco, Milano, Casa Editrice Settentrionale, 1906.
