= Maria Pellegrino Park =

Municipal park in Marble Hill, Missouri, U.S.

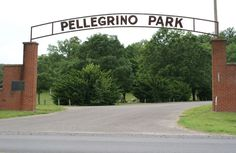

- Location within Missouri Location within the United States
- Type: Municipal park
- Location: Marble Hill, Missouri, 63764 United States
- Coordinates: 37°18′16″N 89°59′19″W
- Area: 31 acres (13 ha)
- Elevation: 479 ft (146 m)
- Created: June 4, 1972; 54 years ago
- Founder: Frank P. Pellegrino
- Owner: City of Marble Hill
- Website: Pellegrino Park

Maria Pellegrino Park is a municipal park in the western of portion of Marble Hill, Missouri, United States. The park is the largest of the five reserves in the municipality. Pellegrino Park features tennis courts, pavilions, playground equipment, picnic tables, restroom facilities, forest, and a two acre lake for fishing. The park began planning in 1969 and was established in 1972 on 31 acres of city owned land. The park was founded by Frank Pellegrino, the former president and chairman of the International Hat Company of St. Louis. The company operated one of its factories in Marble Hill until 1989, employing approximately 300 people. The park was built on land donated by the company located directly adjacent to International Hat's manufacturing plant. Pellegrino named the park in honor of his Italian-American mother, Maria Pellegrino. The plaque located at the entrance gate reads that the park is dedicated to her "as an expression of her concern for the betterment of her fellowman."

== History ==
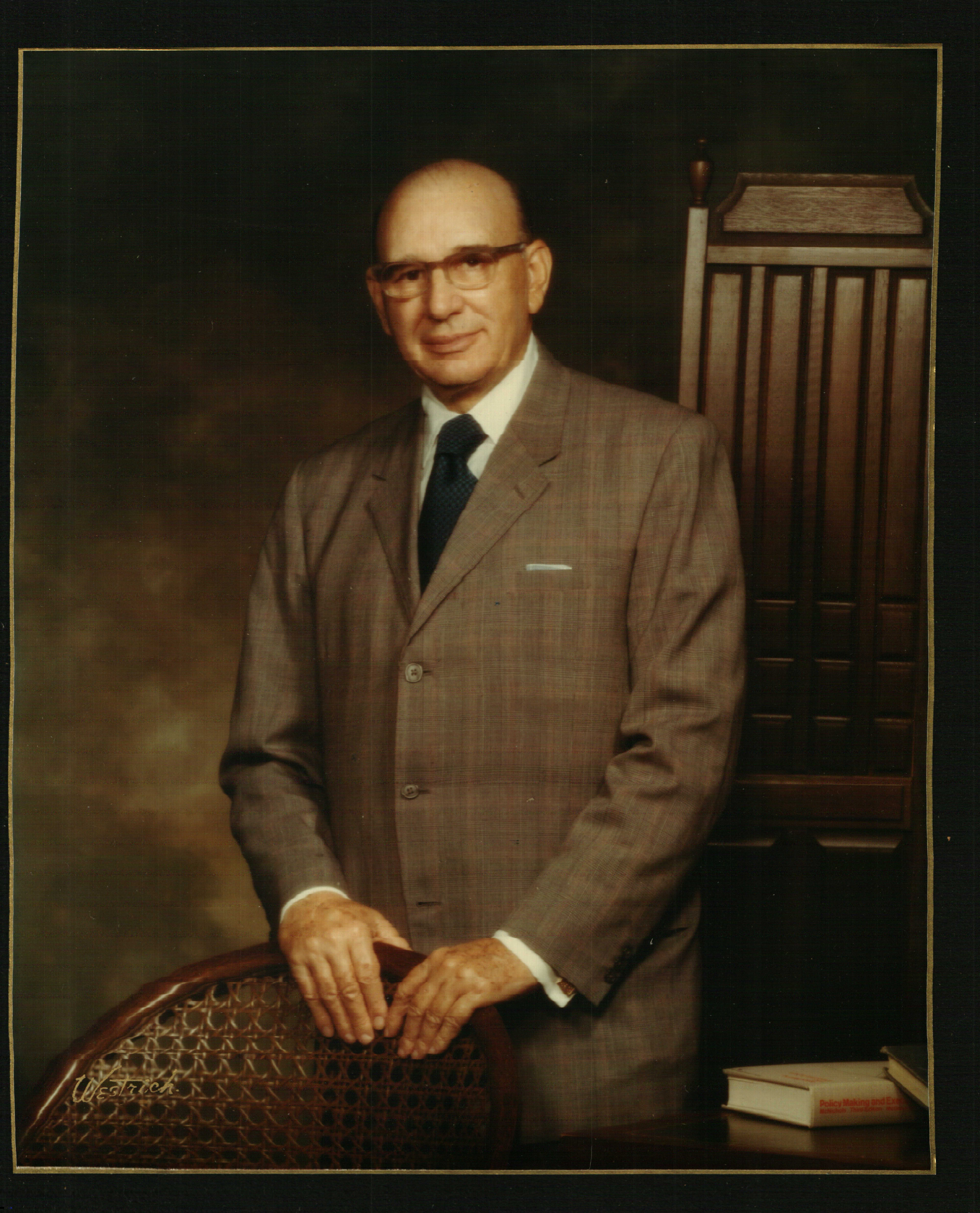
Park founder Frank Pellegrino (1901-1975).

=== Planning ===
In 1969, Frank P. Pellegrino, president and chairman of the International Hat Company, headquartered in St. Louis, Missouri, made an offer to establish a new municipal park in Lutesville. The city was chosen by Pellegrino because of the International Hat factory located nearby, as a gift of appreciation to the local employees and townspeople. He believed in improving the quality of life in the places where his factories were built. This was the second park Pellegrino had built in a city with an International Hat factory, the first being George Tilles, Jr. Park in Oran, Missouri in 1962.

=== Construction ===
Pellegrino donated the land in 1969, agreeing to fund the development of the recreational facilities, park roads, playground equipment, a small pavilion shelter, and tree planting. At the time of its donation to the city, the land was an empty field. Construction of the park began in earnest, in 1970, following voter approval of Pellegrino's gift of land and cash to the city of Lutesville and Marble Hill. The two acre lake was completed by February 1971. Additionally, a road was cleared around the perimeter of the lake by that same month. The initial fifteen picnic tables were funded by a grant from the US federal government and were constructed by employees the Office of Economic Opportunity. While only one pavilion was originally slated for construction, a larger pavilion was added to the plans in 1971, after a late donation of funds by the board of the International Hat Company. According to the first Pellegrino Park board president, Gene Ward, it was decided that the large pavilion would be named the Frank Pellegrino Shelter, in honor of Pellegrino's 50 years of service for the International Hat Company.

=== Dedication ===
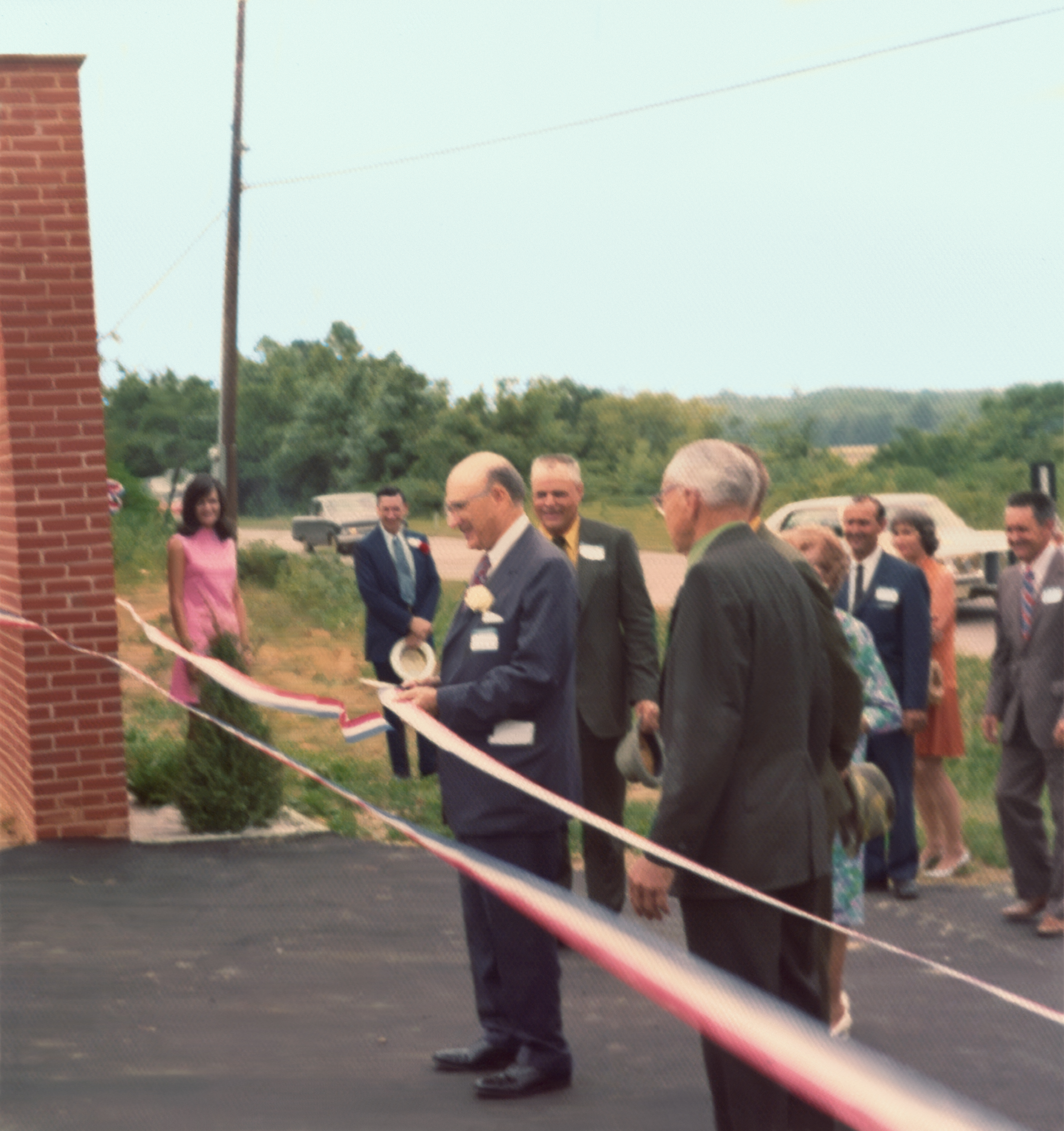
Ribbon cutting ceremony at the opening dedication to Pellegrino Park, June 4, 1972.

The park was dedicated on June 4, 1972 to much fanfare. Over 800 individuals attended the dedication. Pellegrino, Missouri State Representative Frank Ellis, Lutesville Mayor Orville Liley, Marble Hill Mayor Leon Sander, and Bollinger Chamber of Commerce Vice President F. X. Peters took part in the ribbon cutting. The mayors declared June 4 to be "Pellegrino Appreciation Day" in their cities. Representative Frank Ellis read an official resolution passed by the Missouri House of Representatives thanking Pellegrino for his philanthropic donations to the state over the years.

=== Renovations ===
In 1976, Larma A. Wisely established a trust for the construction of a municipal pool in Pellegrino Park. In 1990, Marble Hill was bequeathed $682,000 by the estate of Larma Wisely. However, despite the explicit instructions of the trust, the municipal pool was never constructed inside the limits of the park. The pool was completed in 1992 and was named in her honor. Additionally, the park's roads were repaved under the administration of Mayor Russell P. "Bat" Masterson (2009–2011).

== Description ==
The park is bordered on the north side by Missouri Highway 34. To the south and west, the park is surrounded by forest. To the immediate east of the park is located an industrial facility of MTX Loudspeaker. Inc. The site was formerly owned by the International Hat Company.

== Points of interest ==
=== Pellegrino Lake ===
Pellegrino Lake is a two acre geographical feature located on the southern portion of the municipal park. In 2016, the Missouri Department of Conservation partnered with the City of Marble Hill to manage the health and population of fish living in Pellegrino Lake. Subsequently, Jason Crites, a fisheries management biologist with the department, became the first scientist assigned to monitoring the lake's ecology. On May 21, 2016, the Missouri Department of Conservation had a grand opening at Pellegrino Lake to promote fishing by teaching casting, knot tying, and other fishing skills. The city has expressed interest in the conservation project as a means of boosting tourism to Marble Hill from fishers.

== Activities ==
In 2007, local organizers of Christmas in the Foothills, began sponsoring an annual ice block racing event in Pellegrino Park, a recreational activity in which individuals race to the bottom of a hill sitting on large blocks of ice. A tarp has used in the past during the event to avoid damaging the grass. In 2009, proceeds from the event were donated towards building a community stage at Magnolia Park.

Some local residents have partaken in wood cutting for personal use. The City of Marble Hill allows for the legal extraction of timber from Pellegrino Park with a valid waiver procured from the city hall.

== Issues ==
In 2012, new city officials on the Marble Hill board of alderman became concerned about the commercial timber policy instituted at Pellegrino Park. Alderwoman Beverly Johnson, newly appointed in 2012, questioned the city's earlier decision to seek a contract for a logging crew, in order to cut down trees and sell the lumber on a 14.8 acre stretch of woods. In 2014, 74 black oak, 10 white oak, 8 scarlet oak, 9 black cheery, and 12 miscellaneous trees were bid upon for timber extraction. The timber sale originated as a city initiative to raise some emergency capital to pay for municipal sewer repairs, rebuilding the city lagoon, and water infrastructure, due to past flooding, as well as state and federal fines for noncompliance of city upgrades.

== Gallery ==
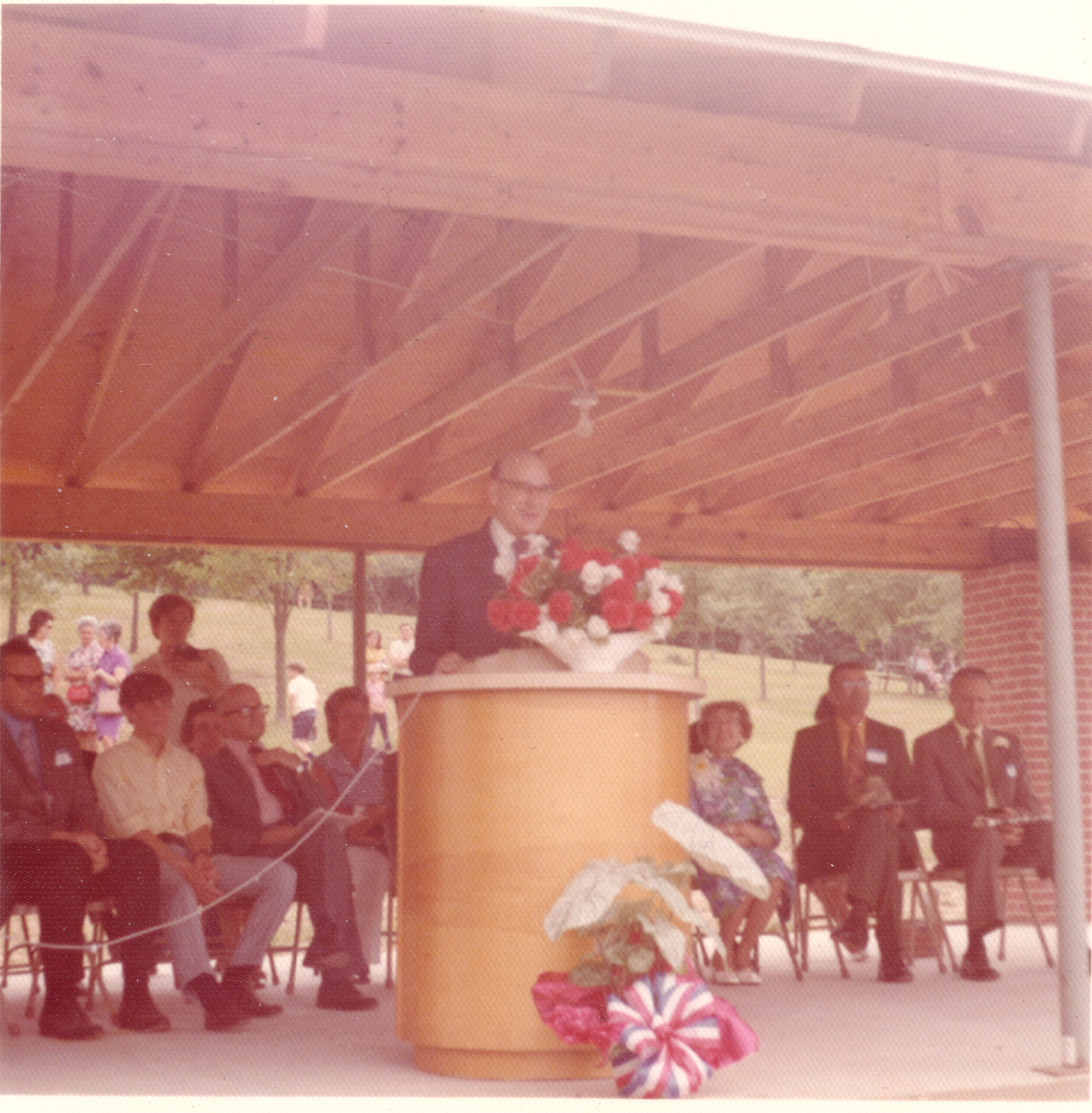
Frank Pellegrino giving opening ceremony park dedication speech.

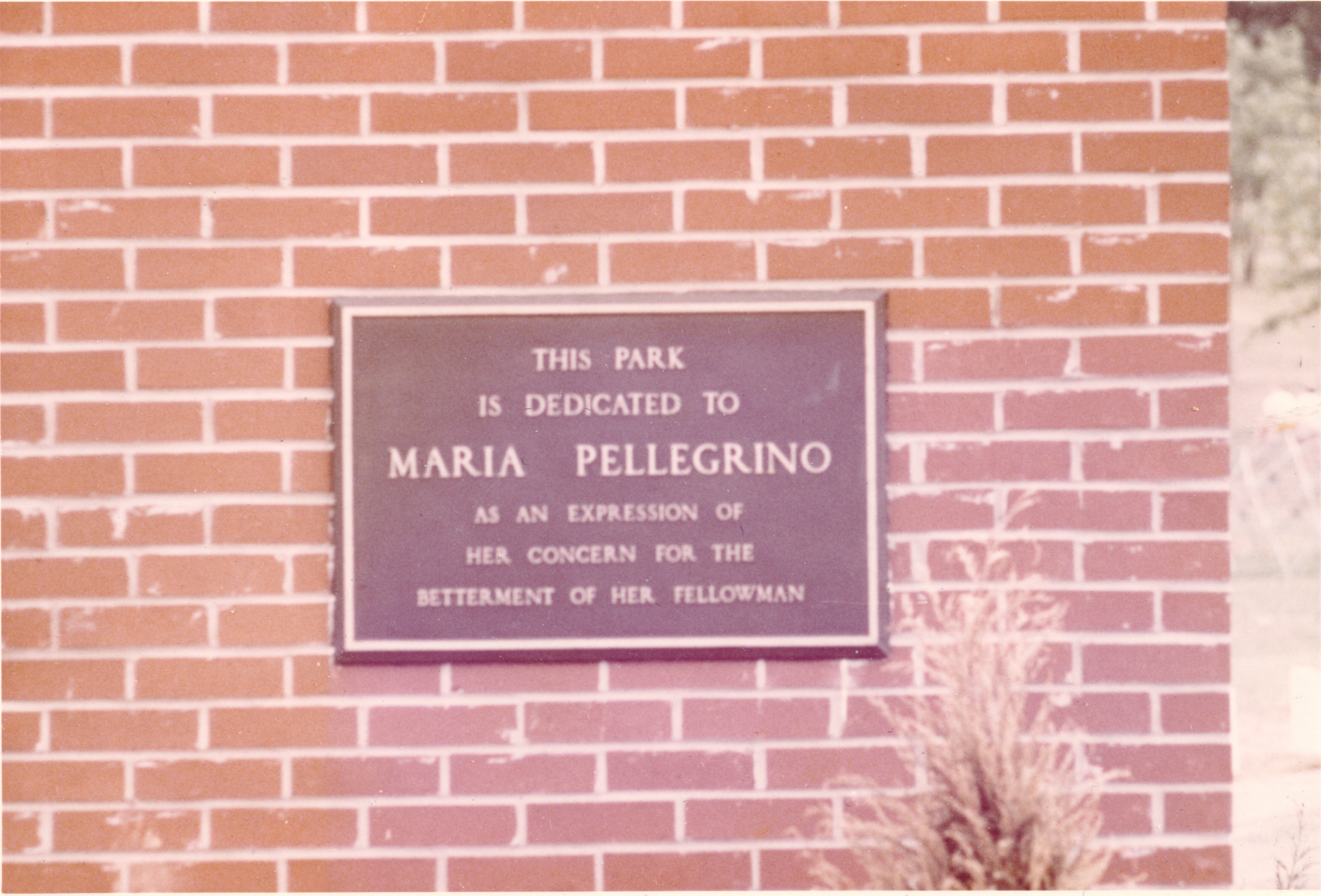
Maria Pellegrino dedication plaque at park entrance.

== See also ==
- Frank P. Pellegrino
- Marble Hill, MO

== Bibliography ==
- Liley, Howard Bland; Liley, Amalie Harriet (1988). Liley-Lyerly and Related Families. St. Peters, MO: H.B. Liley and A.H. Liley. p. 742.
- Route 34 Corridor from the U.S. Routes 60/21 Intersection in Carter County to the Routes 34/72 Intersection in Cape Girardeau County, Carter, Reynolds, Wayne, Bollinger, and Cape Girardeau Counties: Environmental Impact Statement. Washington, D. C.: United States Federal Highway Administration. 2008.
