= List of Italian-American business people =

To be included in this list of Italian-American business people, individuals must have a Wikipedia article showing they are Italian-American business people, or must have other published references showing they are Italian-American business people and are notable.

== Senior executives ==
- Frank Abagnale Jr., founder of Abagnale & Associates, a financial fraud consultancy company.
- Gil Amelio, former CEO of National Semiconductor and Apple
- William Amelio, president and CEO of Lenovo Group Limited
- Joseph E. Antonini, president and CEO of Kmart
- Mark Attanasio, owner of the Milwaukee Brewers
- Joseph Baratta (1971-), Global Head of Private Equity at Blackstone
- Richard Belluzzo, computer industry executive at HP, SGI, Microsoft, Quantum
- Laurence Boschetto (1954-), senior advisor at The Interpublic Group of Companies
- John Brunetti, CEO of Hialeah Park Race Track
- Debra Cafaro, CEO of Ventas, Inc
- Jim Cantalupo (1943-2004), chairman and CEO of McDonald's
- Michael Capellas, CEO of First Data Corporation
- Chris Capossela (1969-), CMO and Executive Vice President of Consumer Business at Microsoft
- Leo Castelli, art trader
- Bob Castellini, owner of the Cincinnati Reds
- Edward J. DeBartolo Sr., businessman
- Josh D'Amaro (1971-), business executive. CEO of the Walt Disney Company since 2026
- Sal DeVito, advertising executive at DeVito/Verdi
- Samuel DiPiazza, CEO of PricewaterhouseCoopers
- Carmine Di Sibio (1963-), Global Chairman and CEO of Ernst & Young
- Nick Donofrio, Executive Vice President of Innovation and Technology at the IBM Corporation
- Roger Enrico (1944–2016) - Chairman and CEO of PepsiCo.
- Fortune Gallo(1878–1970) - Opera impresario
- Joe Gebbia, designer and Internet entrepreneur. He is a co-founder of Airbnb
- Domingo Ghirardelli, Italian-born chocolatier who was the founder of the Ghirardelli Chocolate Company in San Francisco, California.
- Richard Grasso (1946–), former chairman and CEO of the New York Stock Exchange
- Lee Iacocca (1924–2019), former chairman of the Chrysler Corporation
- Paul Montrone (1941-), Chairman and CEO of Fisher Scientific
- Tommy Mottola, Chairman and CEO of Sony Music Entertainment
- Angelo Mozilo, founder and CEO of Countrywide Financial
- Richard Nanula, CFO at Amgen and The Walt Disney Company
- Robert Nardelli, former chairman and CEO of Home Depot and Chrysler
- Frank Nuovo, head of design at Vertu
- Paul Otellini (1950–2017), Intel Corporation's fifth Chief Executive Officer
- Samuel J. Palmisano (1951–), chairman and CEO of IBM
- Frank P. Pellegrino (1901–1975), chairman and CEO of the International Hat Company
- Jerry Perenchio, former chairman and CEO of Univision
- Joe J. Plumeri, chairman and CEO of Willis Group Holdings
- Roberto Quarta (1949-), chairman of Smith & Nephew and WPP plc
- Ed Rensi, President and CEO of McDonald's
- Aaron Russo, film producer
- Patricia Russo (1952–), CEO of Lucent Technologies
- Peter F. Secchia, former chairman and CEO of Universal Forest Products
- Joseph Trino, former chairman and CEO of SynQuest Inc
- Barbara Turf (1943–2014), CEO of Crate & Barrel
- Meggan Scavio, President and CEO of the Academy of Interactive Arts & Sciences (AIAS)
- Sonny Vaccaro (1939-), former sports marketing executive
- Linda Yaccarino, CEO of Twitter

== Entrepreneurs ==
- Dario Amodei (born 1983) - computer researcher and entrepreneur. In 2021, he and his sister Daniela Amodei co-founded Anthropic
- Daniela Amodei, co-founder of Anthropic. Former vice president of safety and policy at OpenAI
- Charles Carmine Antonio Baldi (C.C.A. Baldi), (1862-1930), Philadelphia merchant, banker, newspaper publisher, entrepreneur and philanthropist
- Robert Benedetto (1946–), founder of Benedetto Guitars, Inc.
- Steve Bisciotti (1960–), billionaire founder of the Allegis Group, owner of the Baltimore Ravens
- Daniele Bodini (1945–), real estate entrepreneur, San Marino's former Ambassador to the United Nations
- Hector Boyardee, famous for his Chef Boyardee brand of food products
- Richard N. Cabela (1936-2014), co-founder of Cabela's
- Anthony Campagna (1884-1969), real estate developer
- Domenico Canale (1843–1919), founder of D. Canale & Co., major distributor of food and beverages
- Salvatore Capezio (1871–1940), founder of Capezio
- Henry Caruso (1922-2017), founder of Dollar Rent A Car
- Rick Caruso (1959-), founder of Caruso Affiliated
- Pat Croce (1954–), former owner of the Philadelphia 76ers basketball team
- Anthony Casalena, founder and CEO of Squarespace
- Anthony Checchia (1930–2024), co-founder of the Philadelphia Chamber Music Society
- Ugo Colombo (1961-), founder of CMC Group
- Rocco B. Commisso (1949–), billionaire founder of Mediacom and current owner of New York Cosmos and ACF Fiorentina
- Carmine D'Addario, co-founder of D'Addario strings
- Nicholas D'Agostino, Sr. (1910–1996), co-founder of D'Agostino Supermarkets
- John D'Angelico (1905–1964), luthier from New York City, noted for his handmade archtop guitars
- Edward J. DeBartolo, Jr. (1946–), billionaire, former owner of the San Francisco 49ers
- John Paul DeJoria (1944–), co-founder of the Paul Mitchell line of hair products and The Patrón Spirits Company
- Remo Belli (1927–2016), jazz drummer who developed and marketed the first successful synthetic drumheads and founded the Remo company.
- Daniel A. D'Aniello (1946–), cofounder and chairman of the Carlyle Group
- Chris Deering (1947–), executive and marketer for Sony PlayStation and other video games
- Fred DeLuca, founder of Subway Sandwich
- Giorgio DeLuca, founder of Dean & DeLuca
- Pat DiCesare (1938-), concert promoter and founder of DiCesare Engler Productions
- Dante DiCicco (1988–), executive and head of international expansion for Snapchat
- Jack Dorsey (1976-), co-founder of Twitter, Inc. and Block, Inc.
- Philip Falcone (1962–), founder of Harbinger Capital and LightSquared
- Vincenzo Ferdinandi, designer among the founders of Italian Haute couture
- Frank Fertitta III, American casino executive and sports promoter, Ultimate Fighting Championship
- Lorenzo Fertitta, American casino executive and sports promoter, Ultimate Fighting Championship
- Tilman Fertitta (1957-), founder, president and CEO of Landry's
- Bill Gallo, founder of Columbia Grain Trading Inc. which he developed into the No. 1 supplier of soybeans to China
- Ernest Gallo, co-founder of the E & J Gallo Winery
- Joe Gebbia (1981–), co-founder of Airbnb
- Domingo Ghirardelli (1817–1894), founder of Ghirardelli Chocolate Company
- Giovanni Giotta (1920–2016), founder of Caffe Trieste of San Francisco)
- Tom Golisano (1941–), billionaire founder of Paychex, former owner of the Buffalo Sabres, three-time candidate for Governor of New York
- Vincent Gruppuso (1940-2007), founder of Kozy Shack Enterprises
- Arthur Edward Imperatore, Sr. (1925–2020), businessman from New Jersey, founder and president of NY Waterway ferry service
- Kenneth Langone (1935–), billionaire founder of The Home Depot
- Lani Lazzari, founder of cosmetics company Simple Sugars
- James Leprino (1937–), chairman of the world's largest manufacturer of mozzarella cheese, Leprino Foods
- Gennaro Lombardi, opened the first US pizzeria in 1905, Lombardi's
- Sam Lucchese (1868-1929), founder of the Lucchese Boot Company
- Joe Mansueto (1956–), founder, majority owner and executive chairman of Morningstar, Inc. and owner of Major League Soccer
- Domingo Marcucci (1827–1905) Venezuelan born shipbuilder and shipowner settled in San Francisco, California
- Lelio Marino (1935–2004), co-founder of construction company Modern Continental
- Roger Marino, founder of EMC Corporation
- Vincent Marotta, founder of Jarden Corporation
- John Marzetti, (1936-1899), buisnessman and investor in Columbus, Ohio
- Teresa Marzetti (1878-1972), founder of the T. Marzetti Company
- Robert Mondavi (1913–2008), leading vineyard operator in California's Napa Valley
- Bill Novelli co-founder of Porter Novelli
- Amedeo Obici (1877–1947), founder of the Planters Peanut Company in 1906
- Harry Olivieri (1916-2006), co-founder of the Pat's King of Steaks
- Carl Paladino, founder and chairman of Ellicott Development Co.
- James Pallotta (1958-), founder of the Raptor Group
- Don Panoz (1935–2018), founder of various pharmaceutical companies
- Antonio Pasin (1897–1990), was the founder of the Radio Flyer company in 1917
- Charles V. Paterno (1878-1946), real estate developer
- Jeno Paulucci (1918-2011), founder of Bellisio Foods
- Mario Peruzzi (1875–1955), co-founder of Planters Peanut Company in 1906
- Almerindo Portfolio (1877–1966), President of Bank of Sicily (USA), and Treasurer of New York City
- Leandro Rizzuto (1938–2017), chairman and co-founder of Conair Corporation
- Anthony T. Rossi (1900–1993), Italian immigrant who founded Tropicana Products
- Henry Salvatori (1901–1997), Italian immigrant geophysicist, businessman, philanthropist, and political activist who founded Western Geophysical
- Peter Santenello (born 1977), videomaker, traveler, and entrepreneur who produces videos about travel and human stories
- Jasper Sanfilippo (1931–2020), Illinois-based businessman, industrialist and philanthropist
- Franco Scalamandré (1898-1988), founder of Scalamandré Inc.
- John A. Sobrato (1939-), founder of the Cupertino, California-based Sobrato Organization, a Silicon Valley development firm specializing in commercial and residential real estate
- Vaccaro brothers, founders of Standard Fruit Company
- Donald Valle (1908–1977), founder and President of Valle's Steak House
- Joey Vento(1939–2011), founder of Geno's Steaks
- Andrew Viterbi (1935–), Italian immigrant founder of Qualcomm
- Mike Volpi, co-founder of Index Ventures
- Pierluigi Zappacosta (1950–), Italian immigrant founder of Logitech
- Marco Zappacosta (1985–), founder of Thumbtack

== Finance ==
- Robert Agostinelli (1953–), chairman and co-founder of private equity firm Rhône Group
- Ray Dalio (1949-), Founder of Bridgewater Associates
- Mario Gabelli (1942–), stock investor, investment adviser and financial analyst
- Amadeo Giannini (1870–1949), founder of Bank of Italy, which later became Bank of America, the largest bank in the United States
- Luigi Fugazy (1839-1930), banker
- Douglas Leone (1957-), venture capitalist and former managing partner of Sequoia Capital
- Joseph Perella (1941-), co-founder and CEO of Perella Weinberg Partners
- Frank Quattrone (1955–), investment banker who led dozens of major IPOs during the 1990s tech boom
- Lewis Ranieri (1947–), pioneer of mortgage-backed securities
- Chris Sacca (1975-), Founder of Lowercase Capital
- Anthony Scaramucci (1964-), founder of the investment firm SkyBridge Capital
- Vincent Viola (1956–), founder of Virtu Financial, one of the largest providers of financial services, trading products and market making services

== Publishing ==
- Nick Barrucci, founder, CEO and publisher of Dynamite Entertainment
- Carlo Barsotti (1850-1927), founder of Il Progresso Italo-Americano
- George T. Delacorte, Jr. (1894–1991), founder of Dell Publishing
- Bob Guccione (1930–2010), founder and former publisher of Penthouse Magazine
- Bob Guccione Jr. (1955-), founder the music magazine Spin
- Generoso Pope Jr. (1927-1988), founder of National Enquirer
- Leonard Riggio (1941–), owner of Barnes & Noble
- Louis Rossetto (1949–), founder and former publisher of Wired Magazine
