= Teresa Pellegrino =

Italian chemist

- Born: Grumo Appula
- Education: University of Bari
- Scientific career
- Workplaces: University of California, Berkeley; Center for NanoScience; Istituto Italiano di Tecnologia
- Thesis: 26 January 1975 (age 51)
- Website: Nanomaterials for Biomedical Applications

Teresa Pellegrino (born 26 January 1975) is an Italian chemist who is Professor of Chemistry at the Istituto Italiano di Tecnologia. Her research considers nanomaterials for biomedical applications. She was appointed Associate Editor of Nanoscale in 2022.

== Early life and education ==
Pellegrino was born in Grumo Appula. She was an undergraduate student at the University of Bari, where she completed her undergraduate and master's degrees. Pellegrino remained in Bari for her doctoral research, specialising in chemical synthesis. She worked under the supervision of Paul Alivisatos and Wolfgang Parak, and spent part of her studentship at the University of California, Berkeley. She was awarded a Marie Curie Fellowship and spent one year at the Center for NanoScience in Munich.

== Research and career ==
Pellegrino started her independent academic career at the National Nanotechnology Lab, which was part of the National Research Council Institute for the Physics of Matter. She studied the synthesis of colloidal nanocrystals and explored how they could be used in cellular studies. The National Nanotechnology Laboratory became the Nanoscience Institute in 2010, and Pellegrino was appointed to a permanent position. She was made a permanent staff scientist at the National Nanotechnology Lab in 2014.

Pellegrino's research considers nanomaterials for biomedical applications, including drug delivery and hyperthermia. In 2022, she was appointed Associate Editor of Nanoscale. She was supported by the European Research Council to develop magnetic nanoparticles that accumulate near metastatic tumours. These nanoparticles can be used to treat cancer, either through hyperthermia therapy or targeted drug delivery.

== Awards and honours ==
- 2009 Italian Chemical Society Primo Levi Award
- 2012 Chemical Communications Emerging Investigator
- 2022 European Research Council Consolidator Grant

== Selected publications ==
- Christian Kirchner; Tim Liedl; Stefan Kudera; et al. (1 February 2005). "Cytotoxicity of colloidal CdSe and CdSe/ZnS nanoparticles". Nano Letters. 5 (2): 331–338. doi:10.1021/nl047996m. ISSN 1530-6984. PMID 15794621. Wikidata Q31156768.
- Teresa Pellegrino; Liberato Manna; Stefan Kudera; et al. (April 2004). "Hydrophobic Nanocrystals Coated with an Amphiphilic Polymer Shell: A General Route to Water Soluble Nanocrystals". Nano Letters. 4 (4): 703–707. doi:10.1021/nl035172j. ISSN 1530-6984. Wikidata Q59172788.
- Wolfgang J Parak; Daniele Gerion; Teresa Pellegrino; et al. (5 June 2003). "Biological applications of colloidal nanocrystals". Nanotechnology. 14 (7): R15–R27. doi:10.1088/0957-4484/14/7/201. ISSN 0957-4484. Wikidata Q56921229.
