= V-12 Navy College Training Program =

US Navy program that trained personnel in engineering, foreign languages, and medicine

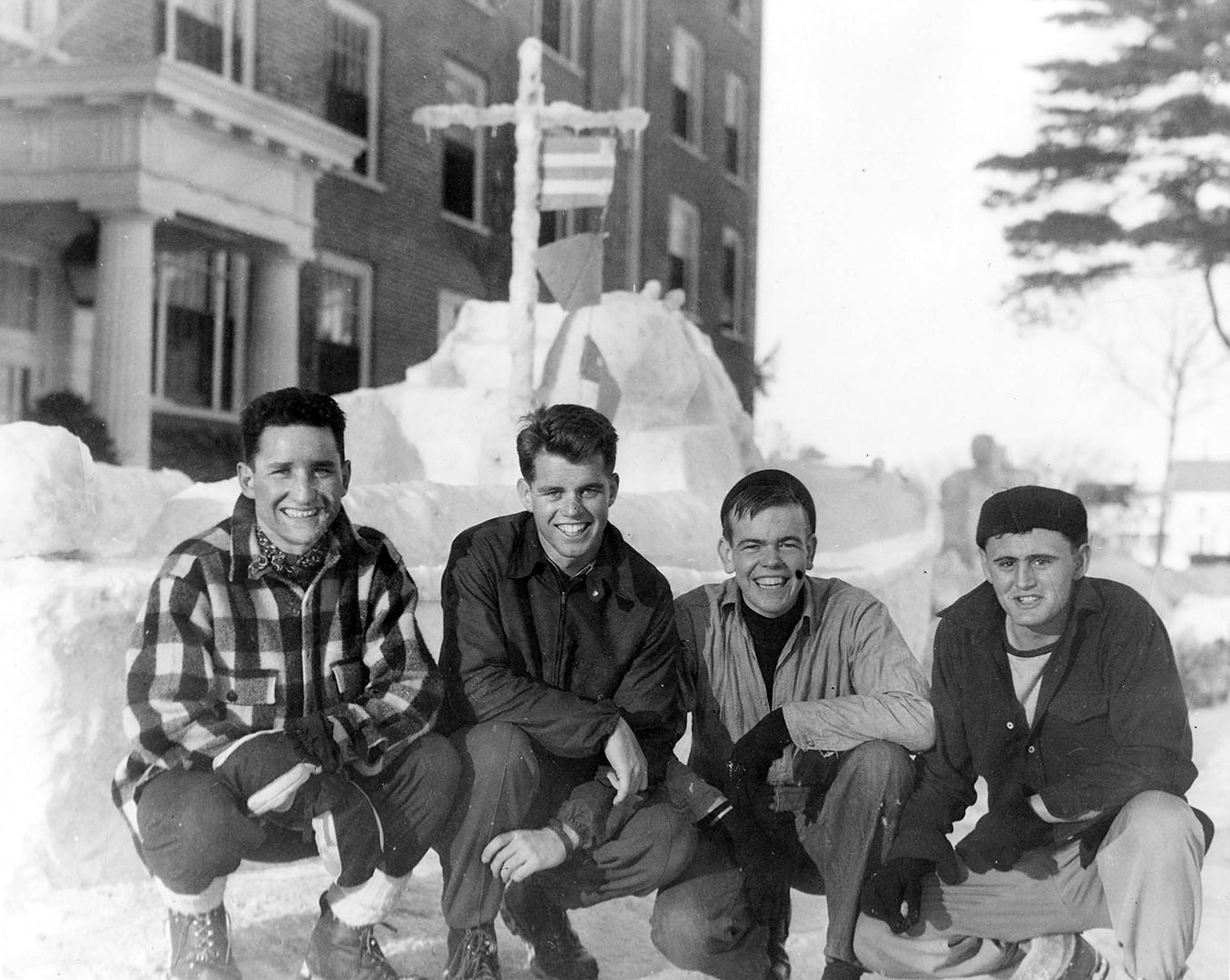
Robert F. Kennedy (second from left) while completing his V-12 studies at Bates College; in the background is a snow replica of a naval ship.

The V-12 Navy College Training Program was designed to supplement the force of commissioned officers in the United States Navy during World War II. Between July 1, 1943, and June 30, 1946, more than 125,000 participants were enrolled in 131 colleges and universities in the United States. Numerous participants attended classes and lectures at their respective colleges and earned completion degrees for their studies. Some even returned from their naval obligations to earn a degree from the colleges where they were previously stationed.

The V-12 program's goal was to produce officers, not unlike the Army Specialized Training Program (ASTP), which sought to turn out more than 200,000 technically trained personnel in such fields as engineering, foreign languages, and medicine. Running from 1942 to 1944, the ASTP recruits were expected but not required to become officers at the end of their training.

== History ==
The V-12 program was founded to generate a large number of officers for both the U.S. Navy and Marine Corps to meet the demands of World War II, in excess of the number that was turned out annually by the United States Naval Academy at Annapolis and the U.S. Naval Reserve Midshipmen's School. Once enrollees completed their V-12-subsidized bachelor's degree programs, their next step toward obtaining a commission depended on the service branch:

Navy

- Navy officer candidates were required to complete the V-7 United States Naval Reserve Midshipmen's School program. It was a short course of eight months. The first month was spent at Indoctrination School, a "boot camp" for officer candidates that had Marine Corps drill instructors. Pre-Midshipmen's School was a preparatory four-month course teaching military skills like seamanship, navigation, ordnance, and how to behave like an officer. Midshipmen's School itself taught academic skills and was three months long. Graduates were commissioned as ensigns in the U.S. Naval Reserve and the majority entered into active duty with the U.S. fleet.

Marines

- Marine Corps candidates reported directly to boot camp and were later enrolled in a three-month officer candidate course. Once complete, participants were commissioned as second lieutenants in the Marine Corps.

=== Inception ===
When the United States entered the Second World War, American colleges and universities suffered huge enrollment declines. Men of prime draft age who would normally have gone into college (or would have remained enrolled until their course of study was completed) were either drafted, volunteered for service, or dropped out and took jobs in agriculture or war-related industries. As a result, some colleges worried they would have to close their doors for the duration of the conflict.

On October 14, 1942, the American Council on Education issued a report on how best to use colleges and universities for the war effort. The plan recommended that a "college training corps" be established on college and university campuses, that members of the corps be in uniform and receive active-duty pay, and that graduates be trained in technical specialties that were of use to the Army and the Navy. President Franklin D. Roosevelt agreed with this report, and asked the Secretary of War and Secretary of the Navy how best they could use higher education in their mobilization plans. The V-12 Navy college training program and the Army Specialized Training Program were jointly announced on December 12, 1942. The V-12 program found more favor with college administrators than did the ASTP. Unlike the ASTP, V-12 students were allowed to attend classes with civilian students and participate in athletics. The majority of the basic curriculum consisted of classes already taught by civilian instructors. Depending on the V-12 enrollees' past college curriculum, they were enrolled in three school terms, or semesters, which lasted four months each.

Captain Arthur S. Adams, from the Training Division of the Bureau of Naval Personnel, was the officer-in-charge of the V-12 program. Richard Barrett Lowe, future Governor of Guam and American Samoa, was one of its early commanding officers.

=== Scope ===
Gentlemen, we are about to embark on an education program that will have important effects on American colleges, on the Navy, and, most important of all, on the lives of thousands of this nation's finest young men. We must educate and train these men well so that they may serve their country with distinction, both in war and in peace. Vice Admiral Randall Jacobs, May 14, 1943

The V-12 program was economically and functionally beneficial to undergraduate colleges and universities in maintaining enrollments during a general mobilization of manpower for the war, and also met and exceeded the critical needs of the military.

== Participating institutions ==
Unlike the ASTP, the Navy predominantly chose small, private colleges for V-12 detachments. Of the 131 institutions selected for line units, approximately 100 could be considered "small," and eighty-eight were private institutions. Eleven were associated with the Roman Catholic Church. Land grant and state flagship universities accounted for only eighteen of the 131 detachments. After the V-12 Program got underway on July 1, 1943, public and private college enrollment increased by 100,000 participants, helping reverse the sharp wartime downward trend.

=== Midshipman Schools (V-7 Midshipman Program) ===
- Cornell University
- University of Notre Dame
- Northwestern University
- Villanova University

=== Line units ===
- Alma College
- Arkansas A & M College
- Arizona State Teachers College
- Baldwin-Wallace College
- Bates College
- Berea College
- Bethany College (Kansas)
- Bethany College (West Virginia)
- Bloomsburg University
- Bowling Green State University
- Brown University
- Bucknell University
- California Institute of Technology
- Carroll College
- Carson-Newman College
- Case School of Applied Science
- Central College
- Central Michigan University
- Central Missouri State Teachers College
- Colgate University
- College of the Holy Cross
- College of St. Thomas
- College of the Pacific
- Colorado College
- Columbia University
- Cornell University
- Dartmouth College
- Denison University
- DePauw University
- Dickinson State Teachers College
- Doane College
- Drew University
- Duke University
- Emory & Henry College
- Emory University
- Franklin and Marshall College
- Georgia Institute of Technology
- Gonzaga University
- Gustavus Adolphus College
- Hampden–Sydney College
- Harvard University
- Hobart College
- Howard College
- Iowa State College
- Illinois Institute of Technology
- Illinois State Normal University
- Indiana State Teachers College
- John Carroll University
- Kansas State Teachers College
- Lawrence College
- Louisiana Polytechnic Institute
- Marquette University
- Massachusetts Institute of Technology
- Mercer University
- Miami University
- Middlebury College
- Milligan College
- Millsaps College
- Mississippi College
- Missouri Valley College
- Montana School of Mines
- Mount Saint Mary's College
- Muhlenberg College
- Murray State Teacher's College
- Nebraska State Teachers College
- Newberry College
- North Dakota State School of Science
- North Texas Agricultural College
- Northwest Missouri State Teachers College
- Northwestern University
- Oberlin College
- Occidental College
- Ohio Wesleyan University
- Park College
- Pennsylvania State University
- Princeton University
- Purdue University
- Rensselaer Polytechnic Institute
- Rice Institute
- Saint Ambrose College
- St. Lawrence University
- St. Mary's College
- Southeast Missouri State Teachers College
- Southern Methodist University
- Southwestern Louisiana Institute
- Southwestern University
- Stevens Institute of Technology
- Swarthmore College
- Texas Christian University
- Trinity College
- Tufts College
- Tulane University
- Union College
- University of California, Berkeley
- University of California, Los Angeles
- University of Chicago
- University of Colorado
- University of Dubuque
- University of Idaho – Southern Branch
- University of Illinois
- University of Kansas
- University of Louisville
- University of Miami
- University of Michigan at Ann Arbor
- University of Minnesota
- University of New Mexico
- University of North Carolina at Chapel Hill
- University of Notre Dame
- University of Oklahoma
- University of Pennsylvania
- University of Redlands
- University of Richmond
- University of Rochester
- University of South Carolina
- University of South Dakota
- University of Southern California
- University of the South
- University of Texas at Austin
- University of Utah
- University of Virginia
- University of Washington
- University of Wisconsin–Madison
- Ursinus College
- Villanova College
- Wabash College
- Washburn Municipal University
- Webb Institute of Naval Architecture
- Wesleyan University
- West Virginia State College
- West Virginia University
- Western Michigan College
- Westminster College
- Whitman College
- Willamette University
- Williams College
- Worcester Polytechnic Institute
- Yale University

=== Medical units ===
- Albany Medical College
- Baylor University
- Boston University School of Medicine
- Cornell University Medical College
- College of Medical Evangelists
- Creighton University College of Medicine
- Duke University School of Medicine
- Emory University School of Medicine
- George Washington University Medical School
- Georgetown University School of Medicine
- Hahnemann Medical College
- Indiana University School of Medicine, Indianapolis
- Jefferson Medical College
- Johns Hopkins School of Medicine
- Long Island College of Medicine
- Louisiana State University
- Loyola University - Stritch School of Medicine
- Medical College of South Carolina
- Medical College of Virginia
- Marquette University School of Medicine
- New York Medical College
- North Pacific College of Oregon
- Northwestern University School of Medicine
- NYU College of Medicine
- Saint Louis University School of Medicine
- Southwestern Medical Foundation
- Southwestern University
- Stanford University School of Medicine
- Syracuse University College of Medicine
- Temple University School of Medicine
- Tulane University School of Medicine
- University of Alabama School of Medicine
- University of Arkansas College of Medicine
- University of Buffalo School of Medicine
- University of Chicago School of Medicine
- University of Cincinnati College of Medicine
- University of Georgia School of Medicine
- University of Illinois College of Medicine
- University of Iowa Schools of Medicine and Dentistry
- University of Kansas School of Medicine
- University of Louisville School of Medicine
- University of Maryland School of Medicine
- University of Michigan Medical College
- University of Mississippi School of Medicine
- University of Missouri, School of Basic Medical Science
- University of Nebraska College of Medicine
- University of North Carolina School of Medicine
- North Dakota State School of Science
- University of Oklahoma College of Medicine
- University of Oregon Medical School
- University of Pittsburgh School of Medicine
- University of Tennessee College of Medicine
- University of Texas Medical Branch
- University of Utah College of Medicine
- University of Vermont College of Medicine
- Vanderbilt University School of Medicine
- Wake Forest College - Bowman Gray School of Medicine
- Wayne State University School of Medicine
- Washington University School of Medicine
- Yale University School of Medicine

=== Dental units ===
- Baylor University
- College of Physicians and Surgeons (San Francisco)
- Creighton University College of Dentistry
- Emory University School of Medicine
- Indiana University School of Dentistry
- Loyola University - Stritch School of Medicine
- North Pacific College of Oregon - School of Dentistry
- Marquette University School of Dentistry
- Ohio State University College of Dentistry
- Saint Louis University School of Dentistry
- University of Buffalo School of Dentistry
- University of Detroit Mercy School of Dentistry
- University of Illinois College of Dentistry
- University of Louisville School of Dentistry
- University of Maryland School of Medicine
- University of Minnesota Medical School
- University of Missouri–Kansas City School of Dentistry
- University of Pittsburgh School of Dental Medicine
- University of Tennessee College of Medicine
- University of Texas at Houston
- Washington University School of Dental Medicine

=== Theological units ===
- Andover Newton Theological School
- Berkeley Baptist Divinity School
- Chicago Theological Seminary
- Colgate Rochester Divinity School
- Columbia Theological Seminary
- Dubuque Theological Seminary
- Episcopal Theological School
- Garrett Biblical Institute
- Hartford Theological School
- Harvard Divinity School
- Lancaster Theological Seminary
- Luther Theological Seminary
- McCormick Theological Seminary
- Oberlin Graduate School of Theology
- Pittsburgh-Xenia Theological Seminary
- Southern Methodist University
- Texas Christian University
- University of Chicago Divinity School
- Vanderbilt University

== Notable graduates ==
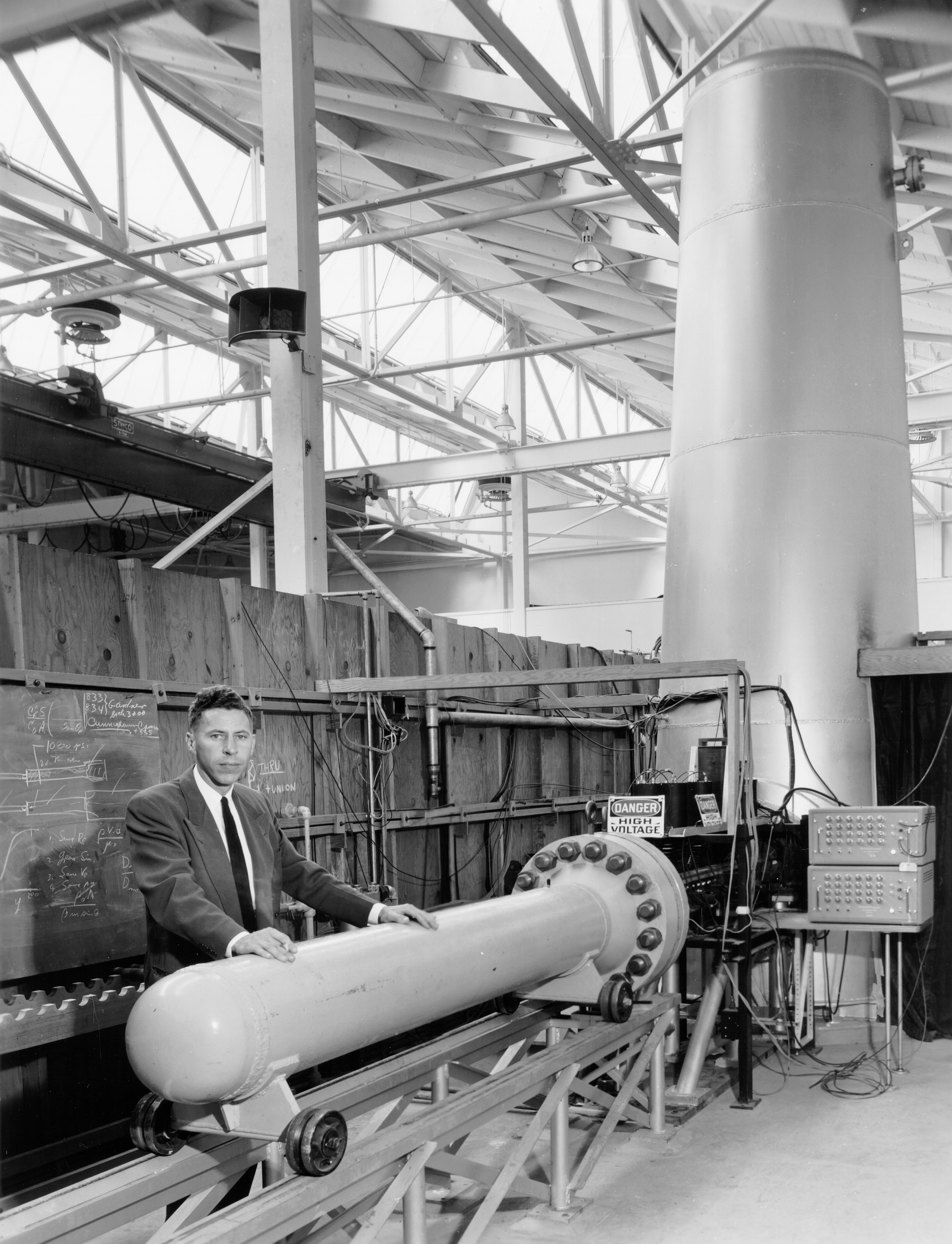
Alfred J. Eggers served as NASA's Assistant Administrator for Policy from January 1968 through March 1971.

- George Allen, football coach (Alma College & Marquette University)
- Howard Baker, U.S. Senator from Tennessee (University of the South & Tulane University)
- Angelo Bertelli, Notre Dame football star and Heisman Trophy Winner
- John Robert Beyster, founder, SAIC, Foundation for Enterprise Development, and Beyster Institute
- D. Dudley Bloom, youngest ship commander in the U. S. Navy during World War II; commander of the flagship of the Atlantic fleet; inventor of rolling luggage and reality-based children's toys
- Harry Bonk, played college football as a fullback for the University of Maryland from 1945 to 1948, and Dartmouth College and Bucknell University in 1944
- Frederick C. Branch, first African American United States Marine Corps officer (Purdue University)
- M. Scott Carpenter, Project Mercury astronaut (Colorado College and Saint Mary's College of California).
- Earl H. Carroll, United States federal judge for the United States District Court for the District of Arizona
- Johnny Carson, television personality (Millsaps College & Columbia University)
- Warren Christopher, 63rd U.S. Secretary of State (University of Redlands)
- Samuel Kelly Clark (1924-2006), University of Michigan mechanical engineering professor known for research on tire mechanics
- Henry S. Coleman (1926–2006), acting dean of Columbia College, Columbia University who was held hostage during the Columbia University protests of 1968.
- Jackie Cooper, actor from Los Angeles, California, attained rank of Captain
- Roger Corman, filmmaker from Los Angeles, California (Stanford University)
- John Piña Craven, helped pioneer the use of Bayesian search techniques to locate objects lost at sea
- Bill Daley, All-American fullback who played for the University of Minnesota Golden Gophers from 1940–1942 and the University of Michigan Wolverines in 1943
- Robert V. Daniels, American historian and educator specializing in the history of the Soviet Union
- Alvin Dark, Major League Baseball Player and Manager, (LSU & University of Louisiana-Lafayette)
- Jeremiah Denton, U.S. Senator, U.S. Navy Rear Admiral, Naval Aviator, Vietnam POW
- Alfred J. Eggers, NACA (National Advisory Committee for Aeronautics), NASA
- Bump Elliott, American football player, coach, and college athletics administrator, played halfback at Purdue University (1943–1944) and the University of Michigan (1946–1947)
- Daniel J. Evans, Senator, Governor
- Jim Fitzgerald, businessman and philanthropist (University of Notre Dame)
- Aloysius C. Galvin, American Jesuit priest, teacher, administrator, President of the University of Scranton (1965–1970)
- Warren Giese, South Carolina legislator and football coach
- Bernard M. Gordon, inventor and philanthropist.
- Samuel Gravely, first African-American Admiral (UCLA & Columbia University)
- Wyndol Gray, American professional basketball player in the 1940s
- Peter Hackes, TV Newsman, White House Correspondent
- William J. Hadden noted chaplain in both the Army and Navy, minister and desegregationist
- John Woodland Hastings, leader in the field of photobiology, especially bioluminescence, and one of the founders of the field of circadian biology
- Wilmot N. Hess, physicist, NASA Apollo Moon missions, National Oceanic and Atmospheric Administration (NOAA) hurricane research and oil spill cleanup
- Bruce Hilkene, captain and starting left tackle of the undefeated 1947 Michigan Wolverines football team
- Elroy Hirsch, LA Rams Football Great
- Edward Kean, creator and writer of the Howdy Doody Show. (Cornell University and Columbia University)
- Robert F. Kennedy, U.S. Attorney General, U.S. Senator (Bates College and Harvard University)
- E. Henry Knoche, deputy director of the CIA, from 1976 to 1977, and acting Director of Central Intelligence in 1977
- Bowie Kuhn, Baseball Commissioner (Franklin & Marshall College and Princeton University)
- Melvin Laird, Secretary of Defense
- John Black Lee, architect in New Canaan, Connecticut
- Jack Lemmon, actor (Harvard University)
- Charles Mathias, Senator
- James McClure, Senator
- Sam Mele, right fielder, manager, coach and scout in Major League Baseball, led the Minnesota Twins to their first American League championship in 1965
- Wayne E. Meyer, regarded as the "Father of Aegis" for his service as the Aegis Weapon System Manager, founding project manager of the Aegis Shipbuilding Project Office
- William Middendorf II, Ambassador, Secretary of the Navy
- Frank N. Mitchell, Marine First Lieutenant who posthumously received the United States' highest military decoration – the Medal of Honor for his heroic actions during the Korean War
- Dade William Moeller, American health physicist, radiation and environmental protection scientist
- Daniel Patrick Moynihan, U.S. Senator from New York (Tufts University)
- Fred Negus, played college football for University of Wisconsin and University of Michigan and professional in the All-America Football Conference and the National Football League
- Clarence Charles Newcomer (1923–2005), US District Judge of the United States District Court for the Eastern District of Pennsylvania
- Paul Newman, actor, entered the program at Ohio University but had to drop out because of color blindness
- David "Sam" Peckinpah, film director (University of Louisiana-Lafayette)
- Frank Pellegrino (inventor), inventor and president of General Fibre Company
- Sidney Phillips, author, physician, U.S. Marine
- William Dale Phillips, chemist, nuclear magnetic resonance spectroscopist, federal science policy advisor and member of the National Academy of Sciences
- Robert C. Pierpoint, TV Newsman, White House Correspondent
- Victor Prather, American flight surgeon famous for taking part in "Project RAM", a government project to develop the space suit
- John Prchlik, NFL Player – Detroit Lions
- Al Rosen, Major League Baseball Player and Executive
- Carl T. Rowan, Columnist, TV Personality, Ambassador
- Harold L. Ryan, served as a federal judge on the United States District Court for the District of Idaho
- Leo Ryan, U.S. Congressman killed in Guyana immediately before the Jonestown Massacre (Bates College)
- Kenneth G. Ryder, president of Northeastern University from 1975-1989
- Pierre Salinger, Newsman, Presidential Press Secretary
- Phillip Shriver, historian and college administrator who was president of Miami University in Oxford, Ohio, 1965–1981
- Leon Silver, geologist who was instrumental in training the Apollo Program astronauts in field geology.
- G. William Skinner, leading American anthropologist and scholar of China
- Eugene Sledge, Author, U.S. Marine
- William Styron, novelist and essayist (Duke University)
- Hugh Taylor, professional football player and coach
- Robert Lawson Vaught, mathematical logician, and one of the founders of model theory
- James Logan Waters, founder of Waters Corporation, a publicly traded laboratory analytical instrument and software company
- William Webster, Federal Judge, Director, CIA and FBI
- Thomas Grey "Tom" Wicker, Columnist and Author
- Roger Williams, Musician, Entertainer
- William W. Winpisinger, president of the million-member International Association of Machinists and Aerospace Workers
- Benjamin Drake Wright, American psychometrician, largely responsible for the widespread adoption of Georg Rasch's measurement principles and models
- Zig Ziglar, author, salesperson, and motivational speaker (University of South Carolina).

== Other US Navy V programs ==
- V1 — Accredited College Program and Naval ROTC (USNR classification)
- V2 — Aviation Branch (USNR classification)
- V3 — Communications (USNR classification)
- V4 — Intelligence (USNR classification)
- V5 — Aviation Cadets (USNR classification)
- V6 — General Service and Specialists (USNR classification)
- V7 — Midshipmen Officer Candidates (USNR classification)
- V8 — Aviation Pilot Training, Enlisted Reserve (USNR classification)
- V9 — WAVES Officer Candidates (USNR classification)
- V10 — WAVES Enlisted Personnel (USNR classification)
- V11 — Midshipmen Officer Candidates O (Older Group) (USNR classification)

== See also ==
- Navy–Notre Dame football rivalry, a surviving legacy of the V-12 program
- Aviation Cadet Training Program (USN)
