= George Tilles Jr. =

- Born: March 29, 1894; Fort Smith, Arkansas, U.S.
- Died: October 26, 1958 (aged 64); St. Louis County, Missouri, U.S.
- Occupation: President of International Hat Company
- Parent(s): George Tilles Sr. Ella Wormser Tilles
- Relatives: Cap Tilles (Uncle)

George Tilles Jr. (March 29, 1894 – October 26, 1958) was president of the International Hat Company during World War II. Under Tilles, International Hat become one of the two dominant manufacturers of fiber pressed military pith helmets for the United States Army, Marines, and Navy. The Tilles Memorial City Park in Oran, Missouri, is named in his honor.

== Biography ==
Tilles was born in Fort Smith, Arkansas, into the well-to-do family of George Tilles Sr. and Ella Wormser Tilles. He was the nephew of capitalist Andrew Tilles, one of the wealthiest citizens of St. Louis.

Tilles became President of the International Hat Company during the Great Depression. By 1942, he had transformed the company from a domestic producer of harvester and straw hats into a war factory of military sun helmets for American soldiers. Throughout World War II, Tilles expanded the company's resources, capabilities, and organization. This allowed International Hat to become one of two major government contracted manufacturers of the pressed fiber pith helmets for US military personnel. Hawley Products was the other major government contractor. The two companies produced over 100,000 pith helmets for military use in the European and Pacific theaters. In particular, the United States Marine Corps used the International Hat pith helmet as combat gear and a standard part of the Marine Corps training uniform. Although the International Hat pith helmet was designed and introduced before the M1 helmet, the International Hat pith helmet continued to be used in the military for many decades, including during the Korean War and Vietnam War. By the Gulf War, only certain personnel in the US Navy had the pressed fiber pith helmet as serviceable gear.

== George Tilles Jr. Memorial Park ==
In 1946, International Hat opened a branch factory in Oran, Missouri. Tilles placed his vice president, Frank P. Pellegrino, in charge of the postwar expansion project into Oran. In the 1950s, Pellegerino succeeded Tilles as President and Chairman of International Hat. After Tilles died on October 26, 1958, in St. Louis, Missouri, Pellegrino prepared a memorial to his friend and business associate. According to Pellegrino:

Mr. Tilles and I founded the plant in Oran and since I have been in Oran often and have learned the town does not have a park, I was of the opinion this would be the ideal place for the memorial I planned for my late associate. It shall be called the George Tilles Jr. Park.

== Bibliography ==
- International Hat Company (1942). International Harvest Hat Company: A Brief History, 1917–1942 (25th Anniversary ed.). St. Louis, MO.
- Suciu, Peter (2009). Military Sun Helmets of the World (1st ed.). Westbury, NY: Service Publications. ISBN 978-1894581523.
- Tulkoff, Alec (2003). Grunt Gear: USMC Combat Infantry Equipment of World War II. San Jose, CA: R. James Bender Publishing. ISBN 0912138920.
