= Frank George Pellegrino Sr. =

American engineer (1923–2008)

- Born: March 20, 1923
- Died: March 13, 2008 (aged 84); St. Louis, Missouri, US
- Occupations: Former President of General Fibre Company; Inventor

Frank George Pellegrino Sr. (1923 – 2008) was an American engineer, inventor, and industrialist. He served as president of the General Fibre Company. During his tenure, General Fibre became the largest manufacturer of duck decoy models in the United States, producing over a million per year in the 1950s. Pellegrino also negotiated the sale of the International Hat Company to Interco, Inc. Additionally, he created a variety of inventions related to the plastic molding industry. Most notably, Pellegrino invented automated assembly line machines in the formation of plastic objects. These machines were used by General Fibre in the production of a variety of plastic models, duck decoys, and Michelob paraphernalia throughout the 1960s to 1980s.

== Life ==
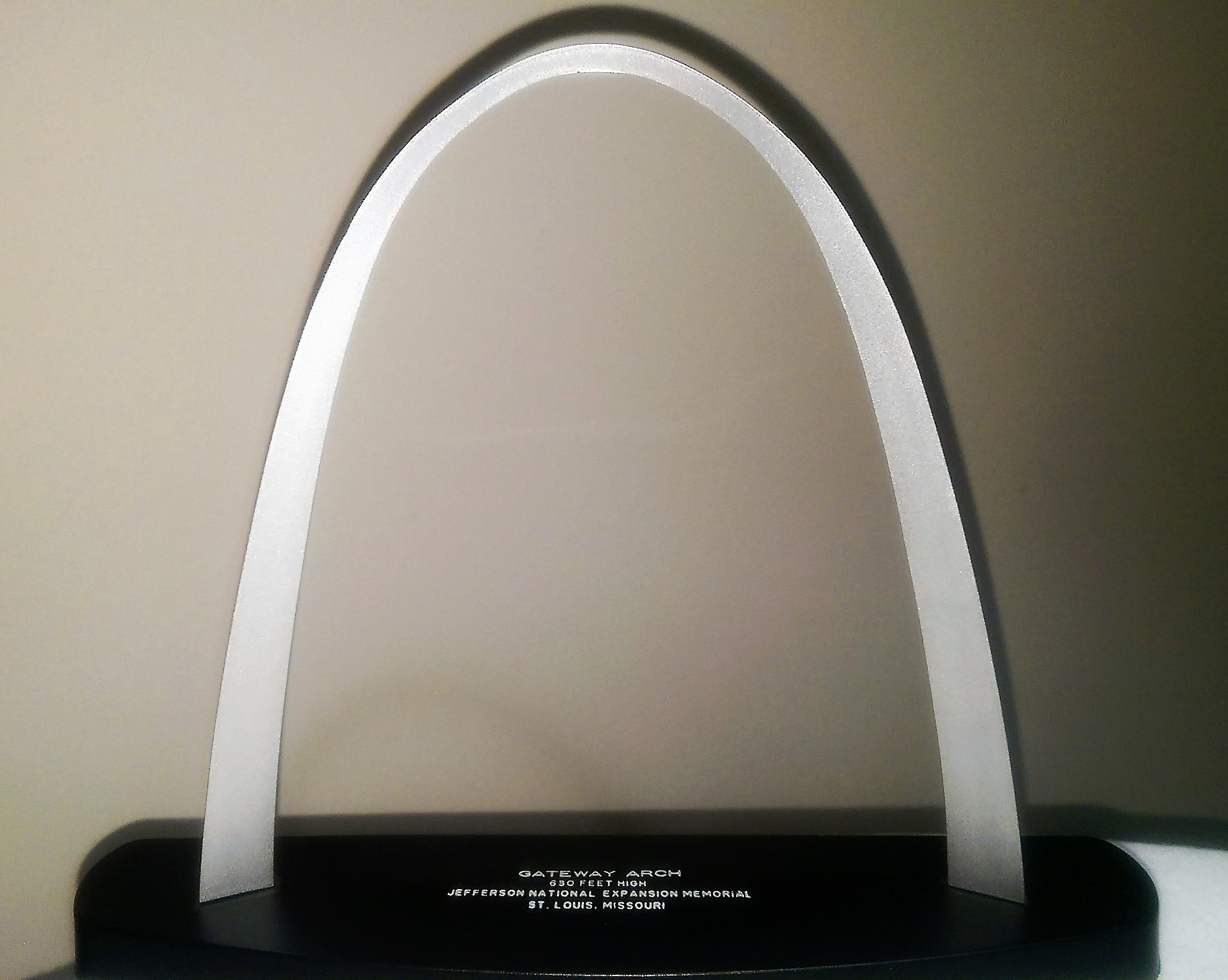
St. Louis Arch model constructed of plastic molding from one of Pellegrino's assembly line machines. The model was sold inside the Gateway Arch in the 1970s and 1980s

Pellegrino was born in St. Louis, Missouri. He was an electrical engineering graduate of Iowa State University via the V-12 Naval College Training Program. He was the son of Ida Kropp and Frank Pellegrino, the philanthropist and president of the International Hat Company. He served as an American naval officer, in the Pacific theater, during World War II. After World War II, Pellegrino was stationed in Japan as part of the US occupation and rebuilding effort. In 1948, he returned to St. Louis and married into the high society, old money Henry family; marrying Virginia Anne Henry, daughter of Harry W. Henry, president of the Graham Paper Company. That same year, Pellegrino was hired as vice president of General Fibre by President George Tilles, Jr.

In the mid-1950s, Pellegrino became president of General Fiber, following the retirement of Lewis Tilles Apple. The company had manufactured the original M1 fiber helmet liner in 1941 before moving into the production of fiber components for the military pressed fiber sun helmets used by American soldiers during World War II. After the war ended, the company required a production transition back to civilian orders.

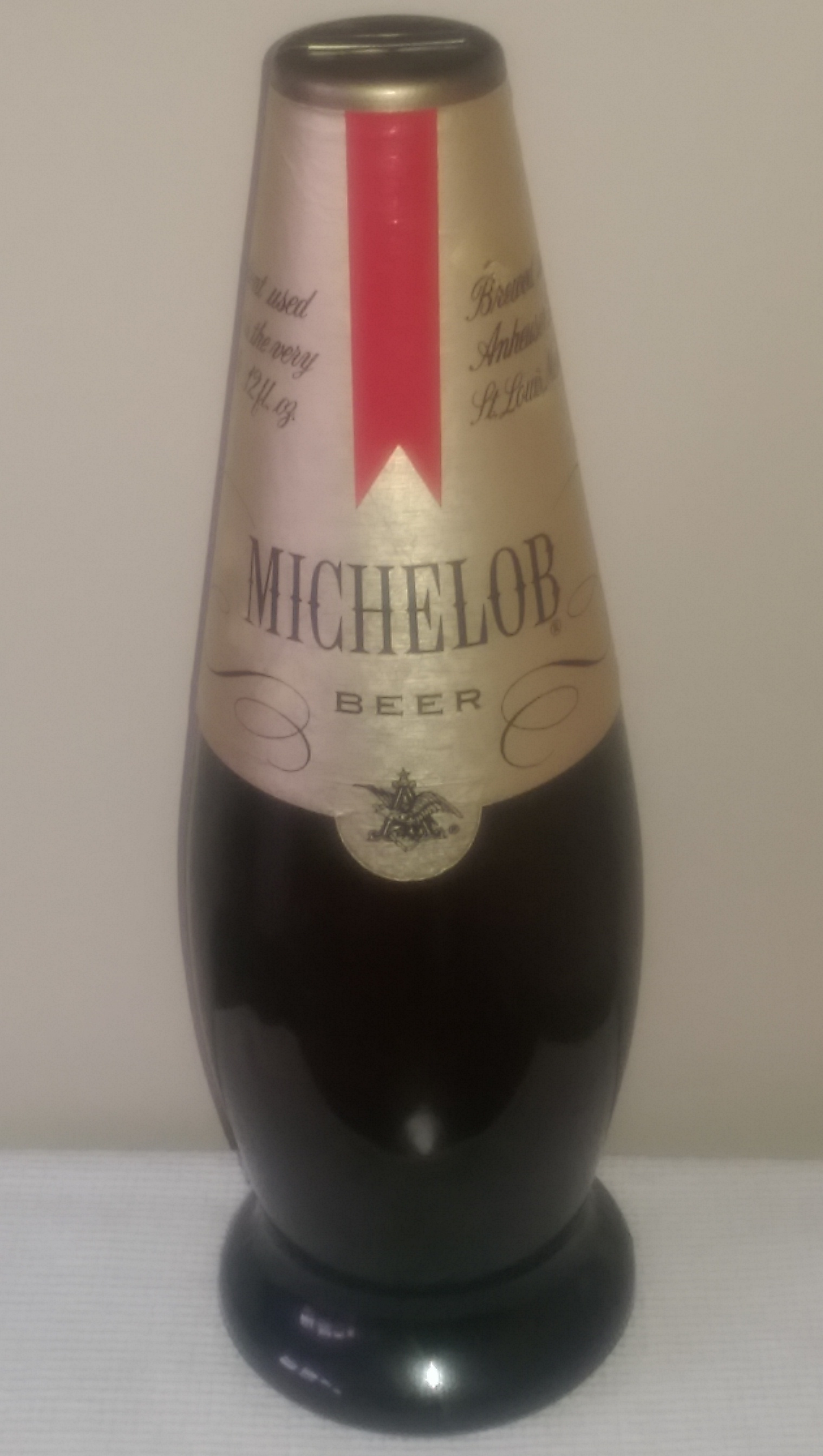
Anheuser-Busch beer bottle coin bank from 1970. This line of products was produced by one of Pellegrino's machines

In 1946, General Fibre switched into the duck, goose, and swan decoy model market. The models were used by hunters to attract prey. During his management of the company, General Fiber reached its peak production of these models in the late 1950s and early 1960s. However, it was during this time that Pellegrino began shifting the company's business model out of the production of wood fiber pulp products into the emerging plastics and plastic molding industry.

In the early 1960s, he designed and engineered new automated machines in the manufacturing of plastic goods. These included plastic models, construction helmets, and various products for the Anheuser-Busch company.

Pellegrino died in 2008.

== See also ==
- Duck decoy (model)
- Fibre
- Molded pulp
- Pellegrino Park

== Bibliography ==
- The Canadian Patent Office Record. Canadian Patent Office. 1964. p. 7,226.
