= John Black Lee =

American architect

John Black Lee (1924, Chicago – April 13, 2016) was a mid-century modern architect based in New Canaan, Connecticut. His inspiration came from Marcel Breuer and Philip C. Johnson. Lee designed multiple homes in New Canaan and beyond. One of his most famous is the Desilver house, built in 1961. This house was later made into a “kit” house, meaning its plans were published and marketed to be built with conceived parts to be designed quickly and efficiently that can be copied all across the country.

Lee's college years at Brown University were interrupted by service in the Navy V-12 Program and subsequent assignment. Returning after the war he graduated and eventually joined Eliot Noyes' firm in New Canaan before opening his own office. Among the many great houses he designed in that town are two he built for himself and one he did for the Day family.

His work has received a number of architectural awards.

One of his most prominent houses at New Canaan, constructed in 1956 originally for himself and his family, was renovated in 2010 by Japanese architect Kengo Kuma.

He died April 13, 2016, of natural causes at the age of 91.

== Selected works ==
- Lee House I
- Lee House II
- DeSilver House
- Teaze House
