= Center for NanoScience =

Research institute in Germany

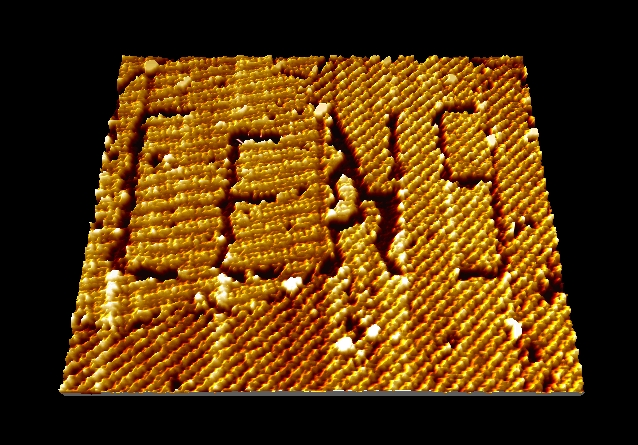
- Nanomanipulation via STM of a self-assembled organic semiconductor monolayer (here: PTCDA molecules) on graphite, in which the logo of the Center for NanoScience (CeNS), LMU Munich has been written.
- Established: 1998
- Field of research: Nanoscience
- Location: Munich, Bavaria, Germany
- Affiliations: LMU Munich

The Center for NanoScience (CeNS) was founded in 1998 at LMU Munich in Munich. Its aim is to promote, bundle and join interdisciplinary research in the field of nanoscience in the Munich area. CeNS is an association of working groups from basic research and industry and acts as a network which connects various institutions from a variety of disciplines. The members cooperate in a horizontal structure based on voluntary commitment, and are supported by a small coordination team.

CeNS consolidates research activities at the nanometer scale from physics, chemistry, biochemistry, and medicine. The CeNS network promotes the mutual understanding and the collaboration between these disciplines by joint seminars, workshops, and schools.
