= Tilles Memorial City Park =

George Tilles Jr. Memorial Park
- Interactive map of George Tilles Jr. Memorial Park
- Type: Municipal park
- Location: Oran, Missouri, United States
- Coordinates: 37°02′42″N 89°23′38″W
- Area: 15 acres (6.1 ha)
- Created: June 27, 1965
- Owner: City of Oran
- Website: Oran Municipality

Tilles Memorial City Park, also known as George Tilles Jr. Memorial Park, is the oldest municipal park in Oran, Missouri, United States.

== History ==
The park was founded in 1962 by Frank Pellegrino, CEO of the International Hat Company in St. Louis, Missouri. The park was dedicated by Pellegrino as a memorial to George Tilles Jr., Pellegrino's, friend, business partner, and former CEO of International Hat. George Tilles was also the nephew of horse racing magnate Cap Tilles.

Throughout the 1950s to the mid-1980s, the company's hat factory was the largest employer in Oran and one of the largest employers in Southeastern Missouri. The Oran factory was also the first International Hat plant built outside of St. Louis. These factors led to Pellegrino's choice of Oran, as a way of giving back to the employees of an International Hat town. As a condition for founding the park, Pellegrino petitioned the city that future funding of the new recreational facilities and park upkeep be managed through municipal taxation. The measure was placed on the voting ballot and passed with 93 percent of voters approving.

== Features ==
Since 1995, a major feature of the park has been the annual car show, sponsored by the Oran Chamber of Commerce.

== See also ==
- Oran, Missouri
