= Wolfgang Parak =

German physicist

Wolfgang Parak (born 22 February 1970 in Dachau, Bavaria, Germany) is a German Professor at the Institute for Nanostructure and Solid State Physics of the University of Hamburg. He is head of the Biofunctional Nanomaterials Unit at CIC biomaGUNE, San Sebastian, Spain. He received his PhD in 1999 from LMU Munich, Germany. From 2000 to 2002, he was Postdoc at the Department of Chemistry at the University of California, Berkeley under Paul Alivisatos. From 2007 to 2017, he was Professor of Experimental Physics at Marburg University, Germany.

As of 2022, Parak has an h-index of 111 according to Google Scholar and of 100 according to Scopus.

Parak is an Associate Editor of ACS Nano (2010–present), and Nanotoxicology (2009–2010). He is / was in the advisory board of the following journals: Angewandte Chemie (2014–present), Theragnostics (2014–present), Nanomaterials (2014–present), ChemNanoMat (2014–present), Colloids and Interface Science Communications (2014–present), Particle & Particle Systems Characterization (2013–present), Nanotoxicology (2010–present), Journal of Colloid and Interface Science (2009–present), The All Results Journal (2008–present), Journal of Nanobiotechnology (2011–present), Recent Patents on Nanotechnology (2007–2010), and Journal of Nanobiosensors in Disease Diagnosis (2011–2013).

== Awards and accolades ==
- 2009 "Nanoscience" – award 2008 from the Association of Nanotechnology-Centres Germany (AGenNT)
- 2011 Ranked #59 in Top Materials Scientists of the past decade by Essential Science Indicators
- 2012 Awarded Chinese Academy of Sciences Visiting Professorship for Senior International Scientists
- 2014 Highly cited in the category materials sciences
- 2018 Bioconjugate Chemistry Lectureship Award
- 2019 SPIE Community Champion
- 2020 Highly Cited Researcher 2020
- 2021 Fellow American Institute for Medical and Biological Engineering (AIMBE)
