= Frank P. Pellegrino =

American businessman

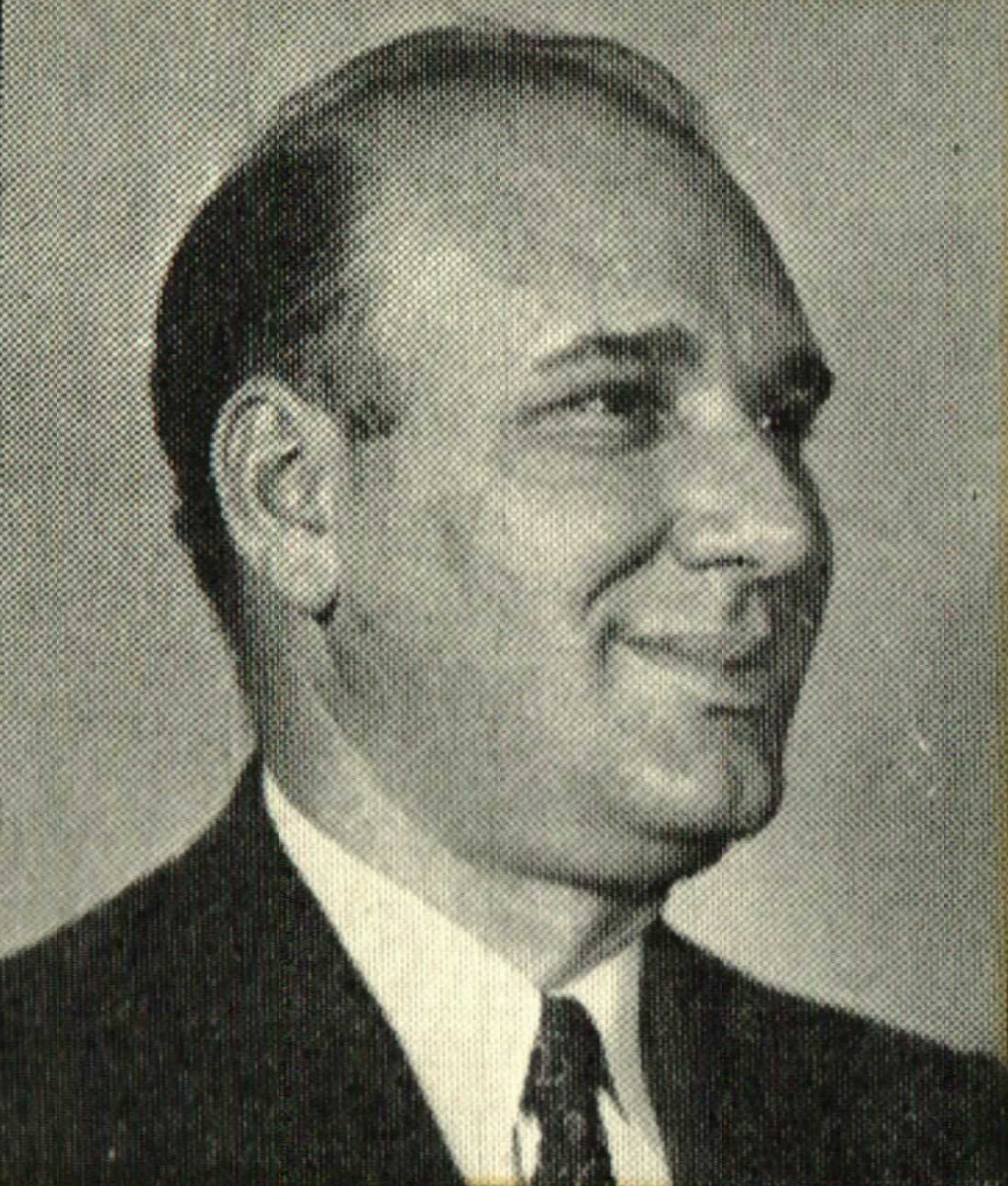
- Executive Photo, International Hat Co., 1942
- Born: Frank Paul Pellegrino; April 10, 1901; Cerisano, Calabria, Italy
- Died: May 22, 1975 (aged 74); St. Louis, Missouri, U.S.
- Occupations: Former chairman and CEO of International Hat Company; Founder of George Tilles, Jr. Park; Founder of Maria Pellegrino Park
- Children: Frank G. Pellegrino, Sr. (1923–2007)

Frank Paul Pellegrino (April 10, 1901 – May 22, 1975) was an American businessman. He was the longest-serving chairman and CEO of the International Hat Company. Pellegrino built numerous factories across Southeastern Missouri, managing the company into becoming the largest manufacturing employer in the region by the 1960s.

Pellegrino also engaged in numerous philanthropic projects throughout his life. Most notably, he established and funded municipal parks in Southeastern Missouri. His donations resulted in the founding of both George Tilles, Jr. Park and Maria Pellegrino Park.

== Early life ==
Pellegrino was the third of eight children and the only child not born in St. Louis. His father and mother emigrated from Italy in 1891 from Cerisano in Calabria, Italy. His father, Ferdinando Pellegrino, was a soldier in the Royal Italian Army in the late 19th century. He received American citizenship in 1896 after renouncing fealty to King Umberto I of Italy. With the death of Ferdinando's father in 1900, the family returned to Italy to sell the Cerisano farm. At this time, Italy was in the midst of a depression. While waiting the sale of the property, Pellegrino was born in 1901. It took several years to sell the property before the family permanently returned to the United States.

As a teenager, Pellegrino began working for the International Hat Company in 1920, as a hat rack assembly lineman. Several years later, his sister Sarah and Josephine would join him as seamstresses for the company. At the age of 19, he married Ida Kropp, a fellow employee and German immigrant that worked as a seamstress at the plant.

== Career ==
By the 1930s, Pellegrino served as Vice President of International Hat under George Tilles, Jr., the nephew of horse racing magnate Cap Tilles. During World War II, Pellegrino became chairman and CEO, serving until his death in 1975. He was a driving force for the production of military pith helmets for the United States Army, Navy, and Marines during World War II. Under his management, the company expanded to incorporate factories, warehouses, and sales offices throughout Missouri, Texas, New York, and Mexico.

== Philanthropy ==
In 1962, Pellegrino donated land and money to establish the first municipal park in the history of Oran, Missouri. The park was dedicated as the George Tilles, Jr. Park in honor of Pellegrino's business associate and close friend. The site of Oran was chosen due to the International Hat factory Tilles and Pellegrino built there together. As a condition for founding the park, Pellegrino petitioned the city that future funding of the new recreational facilities and park upkeep be managed through municipal taxation. The measure was placed on the voting ballot and passed with 93 percent of voters approving. In 1969, Pellegrino donated land to Marble Hill, Missouri to form a new municipal park. Maria Pellegrino Park was named in honor of his mother. The site was officially dedicated by the Director of Missouri State Parks Joseph Jaegar, Marble Hill Mayor Leon Sander, and Lutesville Mayor Orvile Liley. At the park dedication ceremony, the local officials formally declared the event as "Pellegrino Appreciation Day". In 1972, the Missouri State House of Representatives passed a special motion to honor Pellegrino's lifetime of philanthropy towards improving the state. On behalf of the State House, a special award was also presented to him.

== See also ==
- Maria Pellegrino Park
- Tilles Memorial City Park
- International Hat Company
- List of people from St. Louis
- List of Italian-American business people

== Bibliography ==
- Carver, Nancy Ellen (2002). Talk with Tilles: selling life in Fort Smith, Arkansas. St. Louis: Xlibris Corp. ISBN 1401071996.
- International Hat Company (1942). International Harvest Hat Company: A Brief History, 1917–1942 (25th Anniversary ed.). St. Louis, MO.
- Schmidt, Richard J. (1990). The divestiture option : a guide for financial and corporate planning executives. Greenwood Publishing Group. ISBN 0899303978.
