= San Danielo da Pellegrino =

Italian painter

San Danielo da Pellegrino (c. 1480 – c. 1545) was an Italian painter of the Renaissance period. He was a pupil of the painter Giovanni Bellini. His name was Marino, says Casari, who talks about him in his life of il Pordenone. The name San Danielo was acquired as an adult. He painted in Udine and in other sites in the Friuli, and was called Pellegrino da Udine. He painted a Holy Family in the cathedral of Udine. Painted scenes from the life of Christ (1497–1522) in the church of Sant' Antonio in San Daniele.
