= General Fibre Company =

Coordinates: 38°37′57″N 90°12′17″W

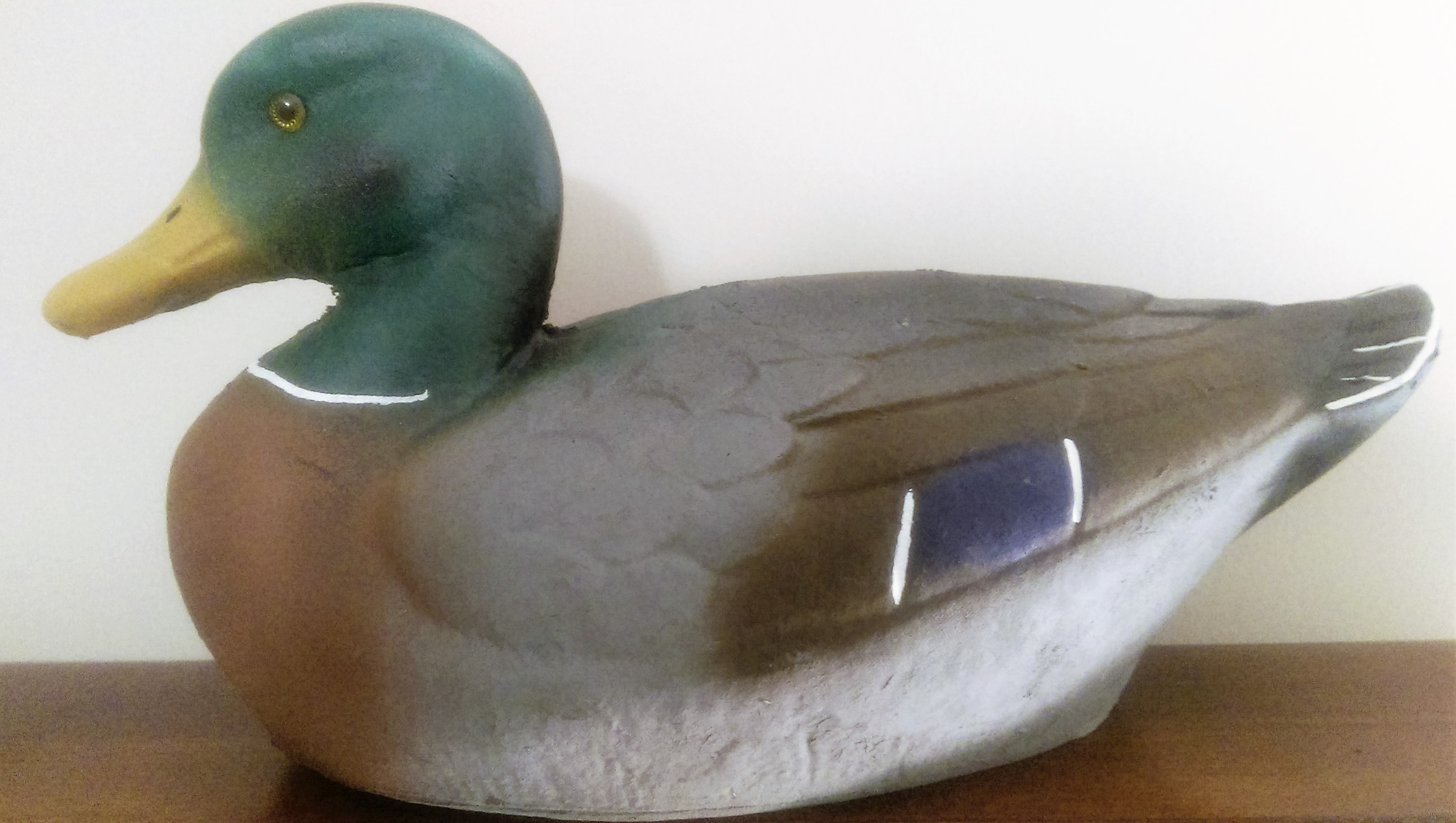
- General Fibre Company's most popular line of products was its Ariduk brand of bird decoys.
- Type: Private
- Industry: Manufacturing
- Founded: 1941
- Defunct: 1985
- Fate: Liquidated
- Headquarters: 1723 Locust Street, St. Louis, United States
- Key people: Lewis Tilles Apple, President; Frank G. Pellegrino, President
- Products: Duck Decoys, M1 helmet liner, Military Helmets, Sun Hats
- Brands: Ariduk
- Parent: International Hat Company (1941–1975)

General Fibre Company, also known as the General Moulding Company, was an American manufacturer of a wide variety of fiber and plastic molded products. The company was known for its popular Ariduk brand of duck and goose decoys. During World War II, in partnership with the International Hat Company, General Fibre was converted into a war factory for the production of military sun helmets. Conjointly, the companies were among the largest manufacturers and suppliers of American military pressed fiber sun helmets during World War II. In the post-war period, the company made an early entry into the emerging plastic injection molding industry, making the transition in material production from fiber to plastic goods. During the 1960s, the company designed and patented advances in methods of producing pulp articles in the plastics industry. Concurrently, General Fibre became a supplier to Ford Motor Company, in the manufacture of plastic interiors. The General Fibre Company closed in 1985.

== History ==
When the United States entered World War II, Hawley Products Company and the International Hat Company were commissioned to produce tens of thousands of military sun helmets for the war effort. George Tilles Jr., the President of International Hat turned to General Fibre Company's President L.T. Apple to supply all the fiber materials for the production of International Hat's pressed fiber military helmets. Over 100,000 pressed fiber helmets were supplied to soldiers of the United States Marine Corps and Navy. From World War II to the Gulf War, these pressed fiber pith helmets are noted for the historic length of their combat usage in the United States, outlasting combat usage of the M1 steel helmet by approximately ten years. The pressed fiber helmet thus has the longest duration of combat usage of any helmet in the history of the United States military. The helmets were produced through the Vietnam War. However, later models of International Hat military helmets were made of plastic, after General Fibre converted to plastic injection molding.

== Products ==
=== M1 Steel Helmet Liner ===
During World War II, Hawley Products Company was a major producer of the M1 steel helmet. General Fibre received the subcontract to produce approximately 120,000 of the fiber linings for the M1 steel helmets manufactured by Hawley Products.

=== Ariduk brand ===
General Fibre began manufacturing decoy ducks under the Ariduk brand in 1946. The company mass-produced mallards, pin tails, blue bills, black ducks, canvasbacks, oversized mallards, and oversized black ducks. General Fibre also produced two species of Canada goose decoys and two types of crow shooter's kits. The ducks were of fiber material with realistic glass eyes, a seamless base, and anchor hooks installed on the bottom. The fiber materials were water proof and constructed to withstand poor weather conditions. Likewise, the ducks were able to withstand being shot without sinking or leaking. In the early 1960s, the company stopped making the fiber version of all Ariduk decoy models, switching to plastic.

== Presidents ==
- Lewis Tilles Apple (1941–1958)
- Frank G. Pellegrino (1958–1985)

== See also ==
- International Hat Company
- Hawley Products Company

== Bibliography ==
- Greer, G.H. (1981). American Stonewares the Art and Craft of Utilitarian Potters. Schiffer Pub Ltd. ISBN 0916838528.
- International Hat Company (1942). International Harvest Hat Company: A Brief History, 1917-1942 (25th Anniversary ed.). St. Louis: International Hat Company.
- Lemons, Charles R. (2011). Uniforms of the US Army Ground Forces (1939–1945), Addendum. Raleigh, NC: Lulu Press. ISBN 978-1105268922.
- Luckey, Carl; Lewis, Russell E. (2003). Collecting Antique Bird Decoys and Duck Calls: An Identification and Price Guide. Iola, Wisconsin: Krause Publications. ISBN 0873495462.
- Schmidt, Richard John (1990). The Divestiture Option: A Guide for Financial and Corporate Planning Executives. Santa Barbara, California: Greenwood Publishing Group. ISBN 9780899303970.
- Tulkoff, Alec (2003). Grunt Gear: USMC Combat Infantry Equipment of World War II. R. James Bender Publishing. ISBN 0912138920.
