= American fiber helmet =

American fiber sun helmet
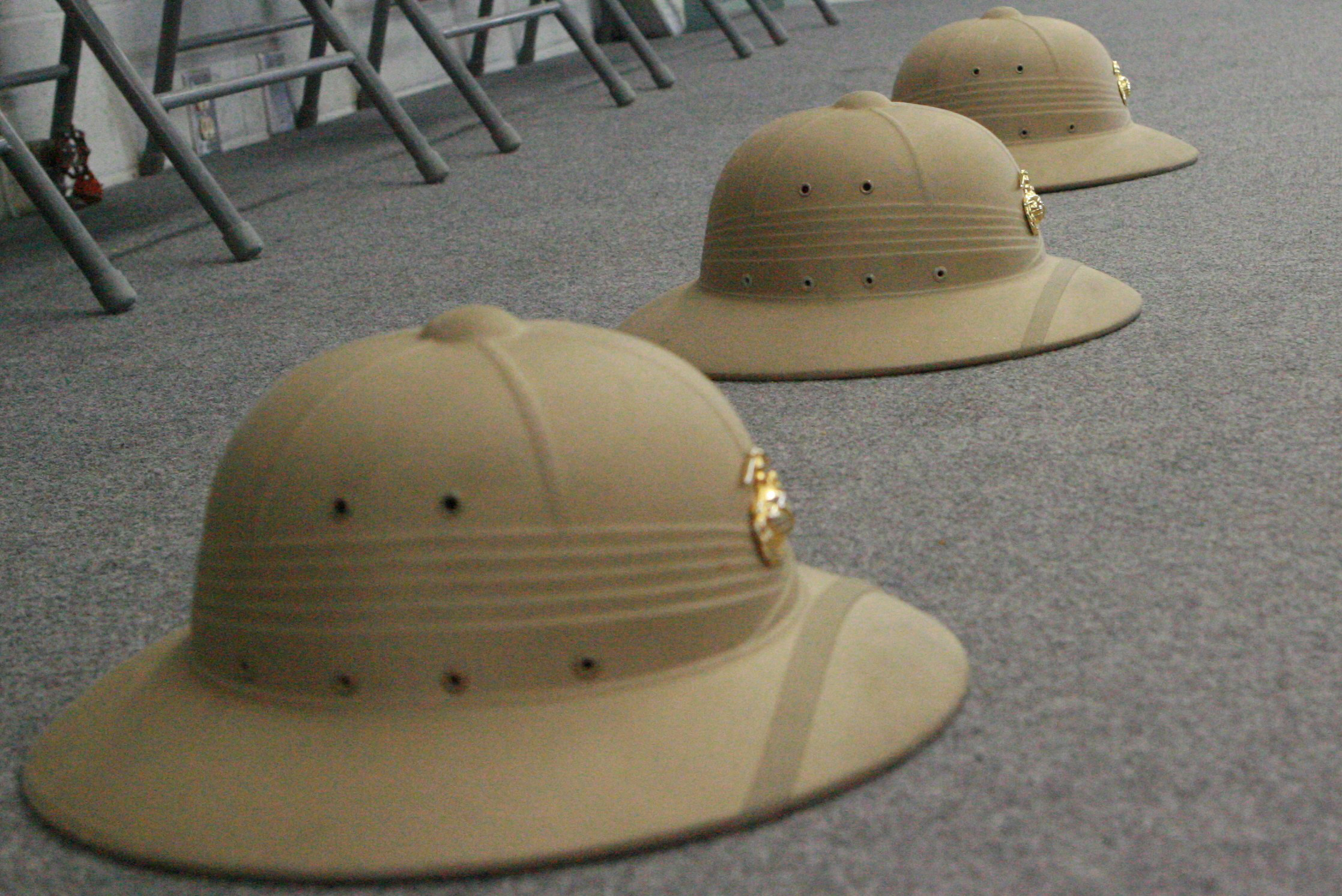
- United States Marine Corps fiber helmets in 2010
- Type: Military and civilian helmet
- Place of origin: United States

Service history
- In service: 1934-present
- Used by: United States Armed Forces
- Wars: Second Sino-Japanese War, World War II, Korean War, Vietnam War, Invasion of Grenada, Persian Gulf War

Production history
- Designer: Jesse Hawley
- Manufacturer: Hawley Products Company; International Hat Company
- Unit cost: $1.36 (1941)

The American fiber helmet (also known as the American pith helmet, safari helmet, tropical helmet, sun helmet, elephant helmet, or pressed fiber helmet) is a type of sun helmet made of pressed fiber material that has been used as part of the military uniform by various branches and units of the United States Armed Forces from 1934 to the present day. As of 2017, the helmet continues to be worn by U.S. military rifle range cadres, as an icon for marksmanship excellence. The helmet is technically not a pith helmet, insofar as it is not constructed from pith material. However, in the more generic sense of design style, this type of sun helmet is modeled similarly to one and thus often referred to in common use as a pith helmet. Additionally, the helmet is not a combat helmet, insofar as it was not originally designed to protect the head during combat. However, the helmet was nonetheless assigned, at various times in the 1930s and 1940s, as combat gear for use in active theaters.

The fiber helmet has been used as a commercial hat for civilians, as well as by the military. At various times, the helmet has been used by all branches of the services, including the military police, marine aviators, officer and enlisted ranks, military parades, graduation ceremonies, and combat training. The helmet has most actively been used by the United States Marine Corps, particularly during marksmanship course training. During World War II, it was issued to all ranks of the Marine service. As of 2017, it is the longest used helmet in U.S. military history, having been worn by soldiers in the Second Sino-Japanese War, World War II, the Korean War, the Vietnam War, the United States invasion of Grenada, and the Gulf War.

Despite its longevity of service, the fiber helmet was never given a model name. It is officially known as "helmet, sun, rigid, fiber." The helmet was originally designed by Jesse Hawley. It was first manufactured by Hawley Products Company in St. Charles, Illinois, and the International Hat Company in St. Louis, for several decades in the 20th century. In the 1960s, a modified version of the helmet was constructed of plastic molding material, as opposed to the original fibrous construction. However, the design remained consistent otherwise.

== History ==
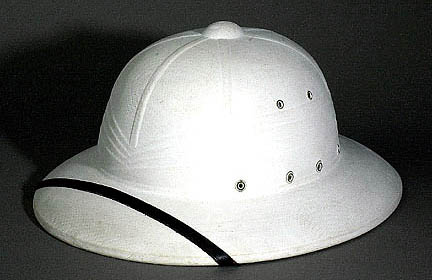
President Harry Truman's pressed fiber sun helmet. The four folds in the faux puggaree identify this as a Hawley Products model.

The fiber helmet was originally designed by Jesse Hawley in the early 1930s. Hawley subsequently designed the first fiber helmet liner for the original M1 steel helmet, alongside the General Fibre Company, a subsidiary of the International Hat Company. The first patent for the Hawley pressed fiber sun helmet was petitioned to the U.S. government in 1935 and subsequently granted in 1938.

The International Hat Company was the first manufacturer of the World War II model of fiber helmets for the U.S. Army, beginning in June 1940 to 1946. The U.S. Army began ordering the World War II model of fiber helmets from Hawley Products from January 1941 to June 1942. During their respective production times, Hawley Products created 27,751 fiber helmets for the Army, whereas International Hat generated 27,434. The helmet eventually replaced the traditional but more expensive felt campaign hat.

In 1941, the U.S. Marines ordered 44,000 waterproof, khaki fiber helmets to be made of 124 warp and 54 filling of threads per inch, with a maximum weight per square yard of 6 ounces. The helmet was first issued to the First Marine Division during their 1941 deployment to Guantanamo Bay, Cuba International Hat produced 20,000 Marine fiber helmets for $1.35 each, while Hawley Products produced 24,000 Marine fiber helmets at a cost of $1.36 each. In December 1942, the Marine quartermaster ordered an additional 100,000 fiber helmets. This included 50,000 to the Depot Quartermaster of San Francisco, 25,000 to the Clothing Officer of San Diego, and 25,000 to the Depot Quartermaster of Philadelphia. Fiber helmets were worn by USMC recruits and the Recruit Training Depots during World War II.

== Design ==
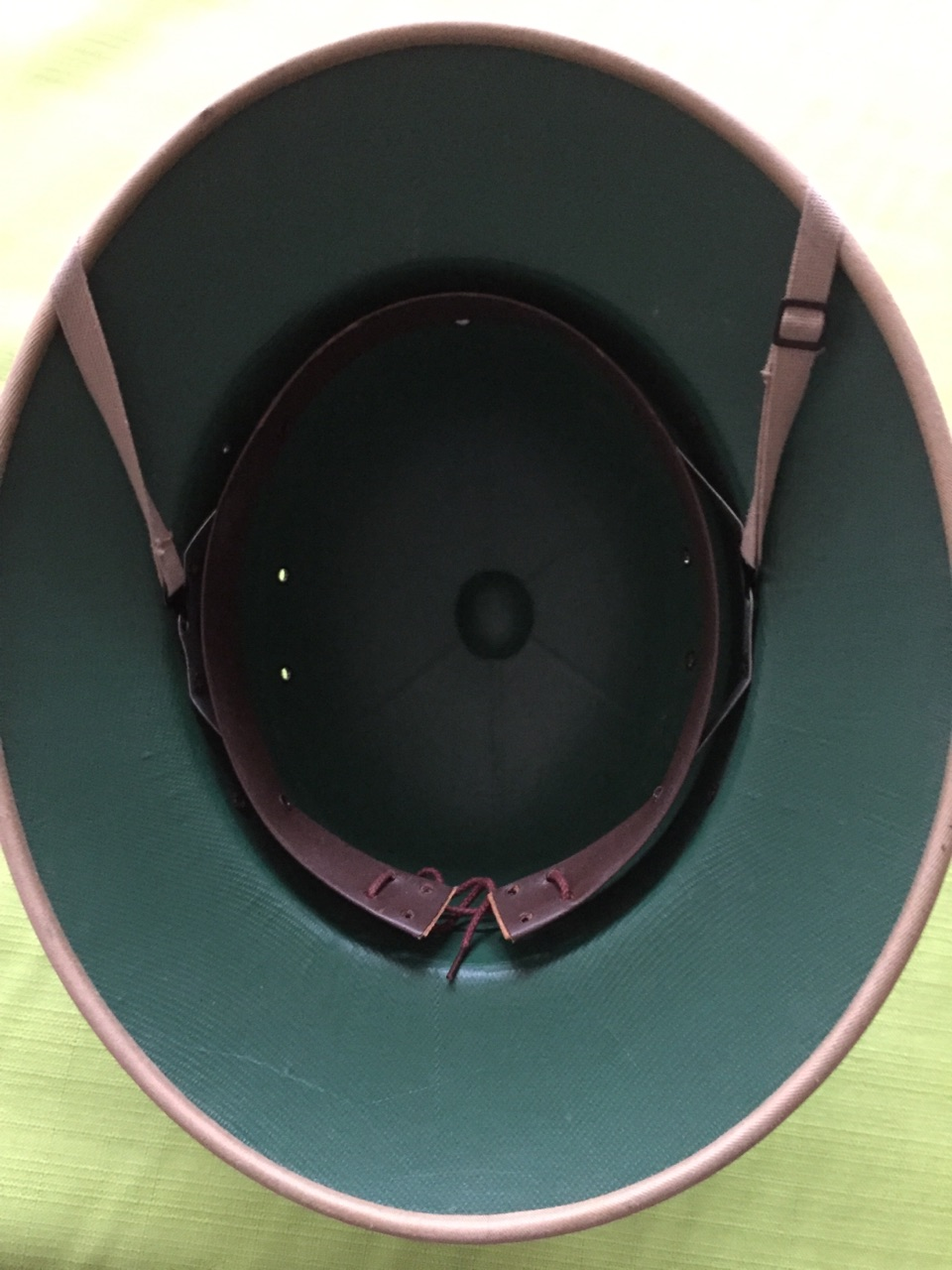
International Hat Company pressed fiber sun helmet interior design. This post–World War II model features a detachable liner and chinstrap, unlike the original model.

The American pressed fiber sun helmet is known for the simplicity of its design, allowing for easy mass production. An important feature in the original conception of the helmet was to be shaped and contoured from one singular piece. This greatly assisted in making the helmet waterproof. The fiber material kept the helmet light and the soldier unencumbered by headgear. The major drawback in the design was the heat. Despite being designed with a series of ventilation holes, the interior of the helmet would eventually become hot in the sun. The chin straps for the World War II model were made by General Fibre Company and Hawley Products Company, the same fiber liner used in the original M1 helmets. The design of the International Hat and Hawley Product versions of the helmet are almost identical. However, the defining difference in identification is that the Hawley Product model has four folds with a wider space between them in the faux puggaree. A puggaree is a type of Indian turban, namely a thin muslin scarf tied around a sun helmet. The International Hat has five thin folds in its faux puggaree.

Military helmet historian Peter Suciu describes the fiber helmet design as taking:

the basic shape of a safari helmet, complete with a faux ventilator at the top and a faux wrapping of puggaree around the dome of the helmet–the latter ironic because previous American sun helmets never used a puggaree. For ventilation, there were a number of vent holes with grommets on each side. The early helmets had three lower vent holes with two vents above, while the post-wartime examples feature four lower ventilation holes.

The original fiber helmets in the 1940s were khaki colored. However, a dark green version of the helmet was produced during the Vietnam War. A white helmet was used by the Military Police Corps in tropical regions. This model of fiber helmets was originally used by the U.S. Navy. These later versions of the helmet had an elasticized chinstrap that was detachable from the helmet. In the case of the original model, the strap was permanently attached to the liner.

== Gallery ==
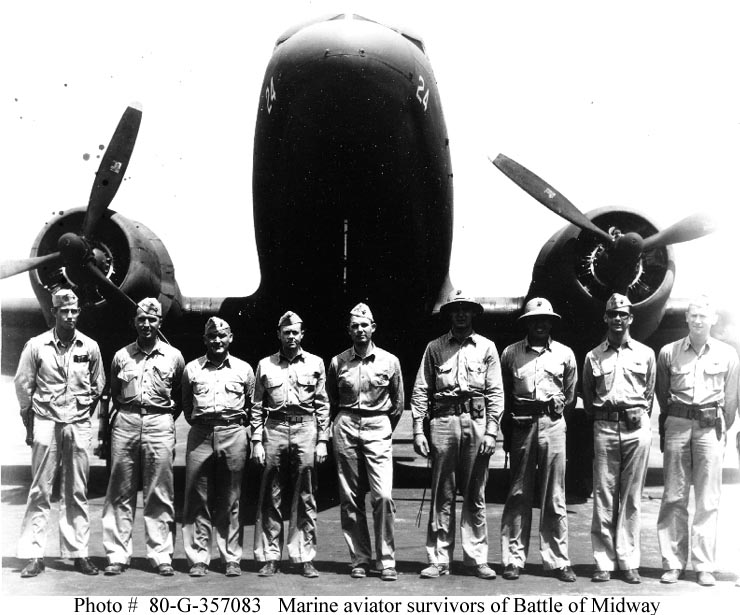
Naval aviator survivors from the Battle of Midway in 1942. Several aviators on the right are wearing fiber helmets.

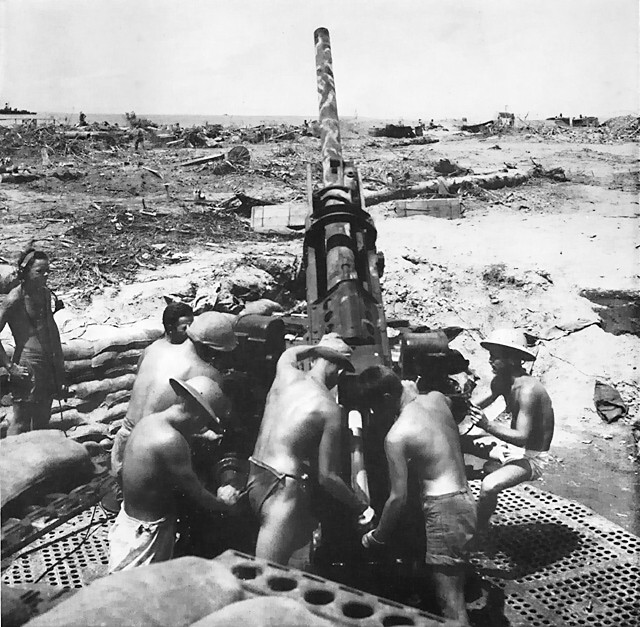
Anti-aircraft gunners wearing fiber helmets at Cape Torokina during the Bougainville campaign

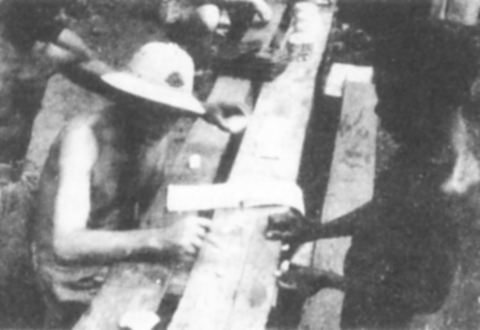
An Australian major, wearing a fiber helmet, pays a local laborer their wages during the Guadalcanal campaign

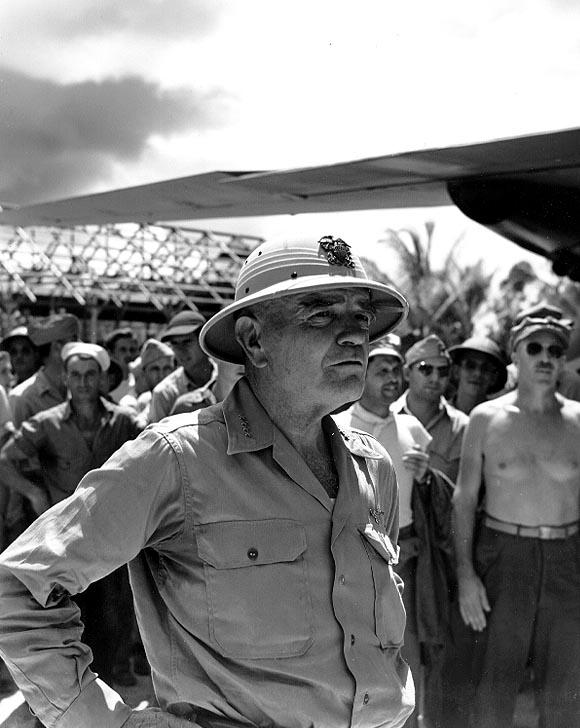
William Halsey Jr. wearing an American fiber helmet in 1944

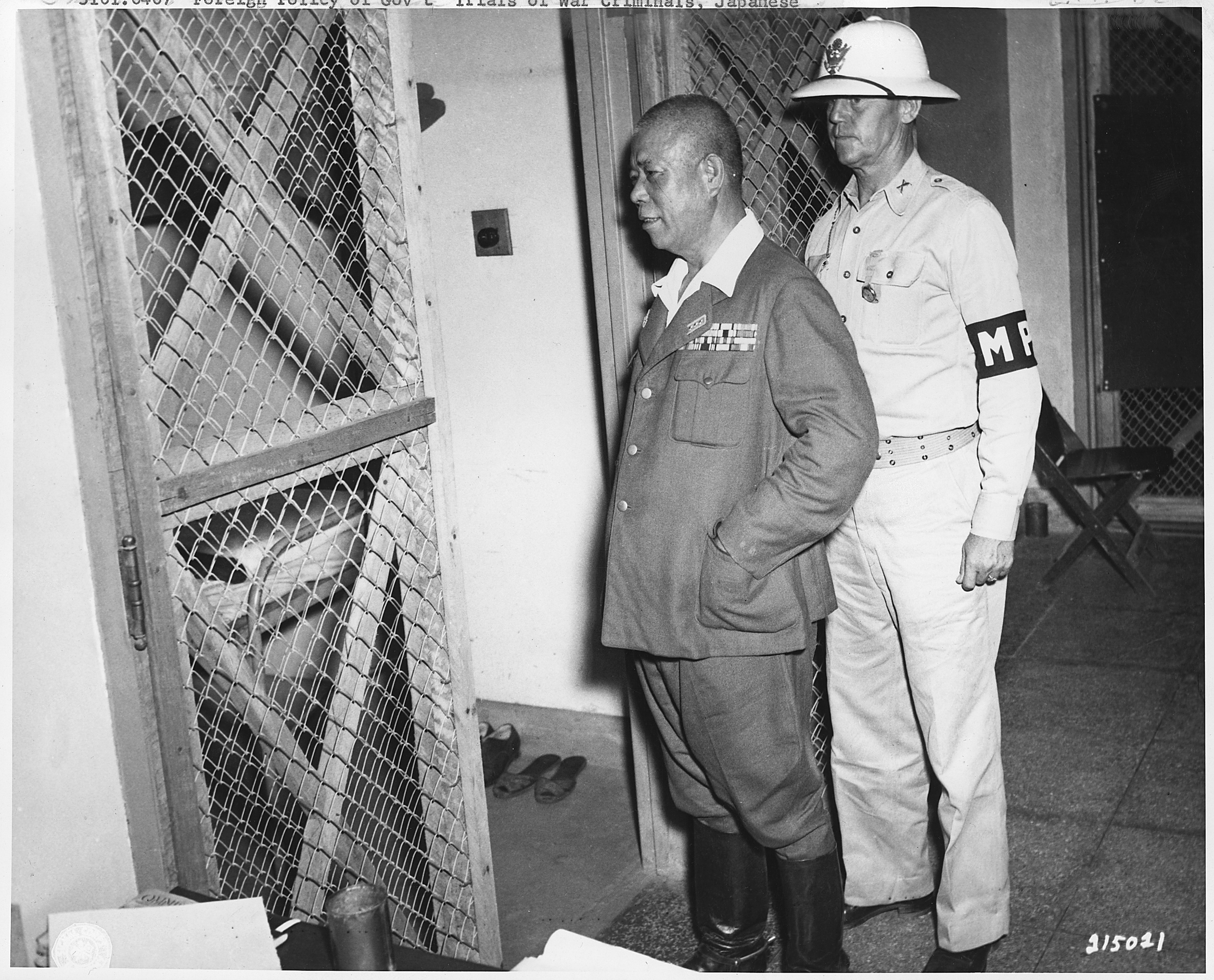
A military police officer, wearing a fiber helmet, escorting Imperial Japanese Army General Tomoyuki Yamashita during his war crimes trial in 1945

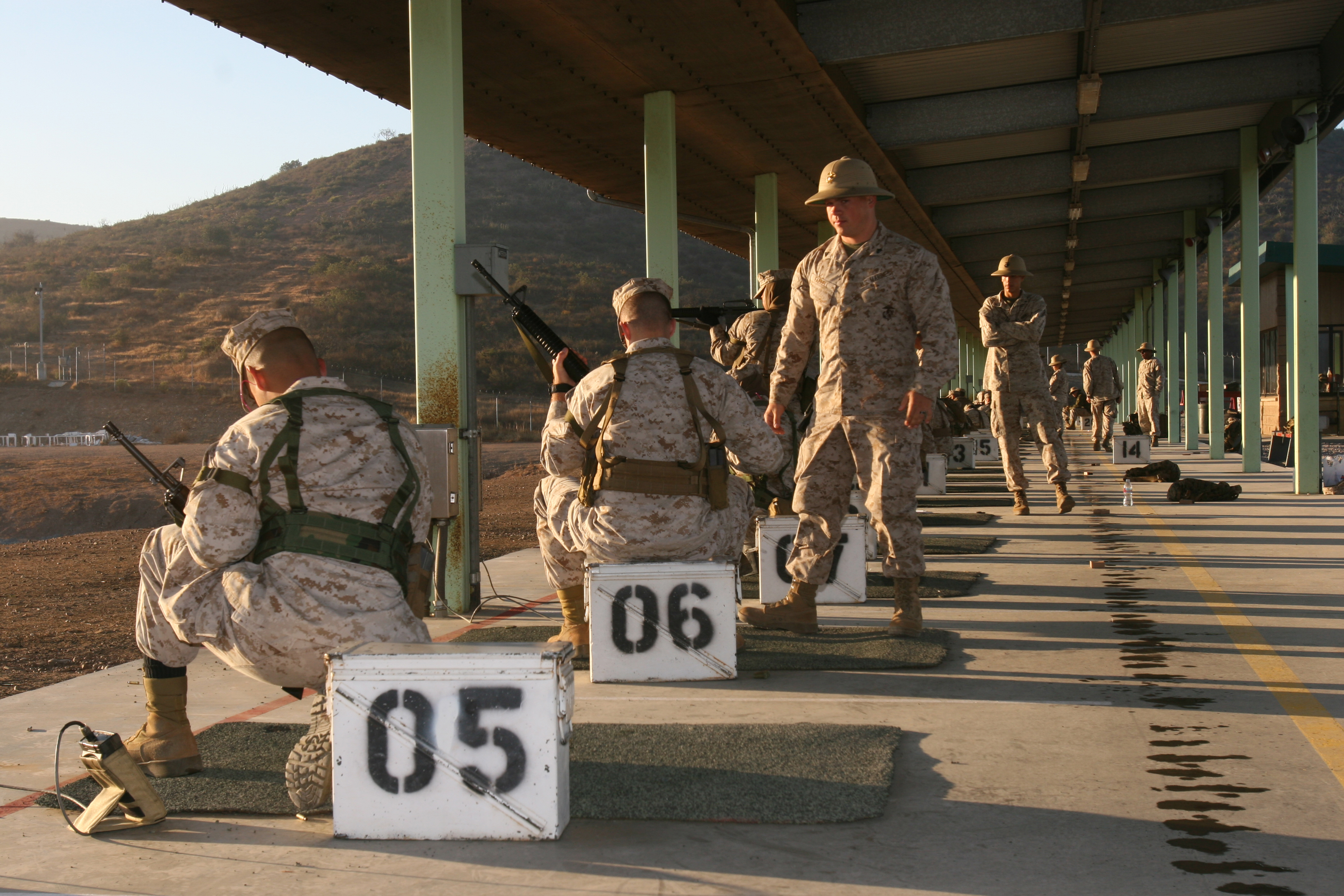
A USMC marksmanship instructor wearing an elephant hat at a firing range at Marine Corps Air Station Miramar in 2009

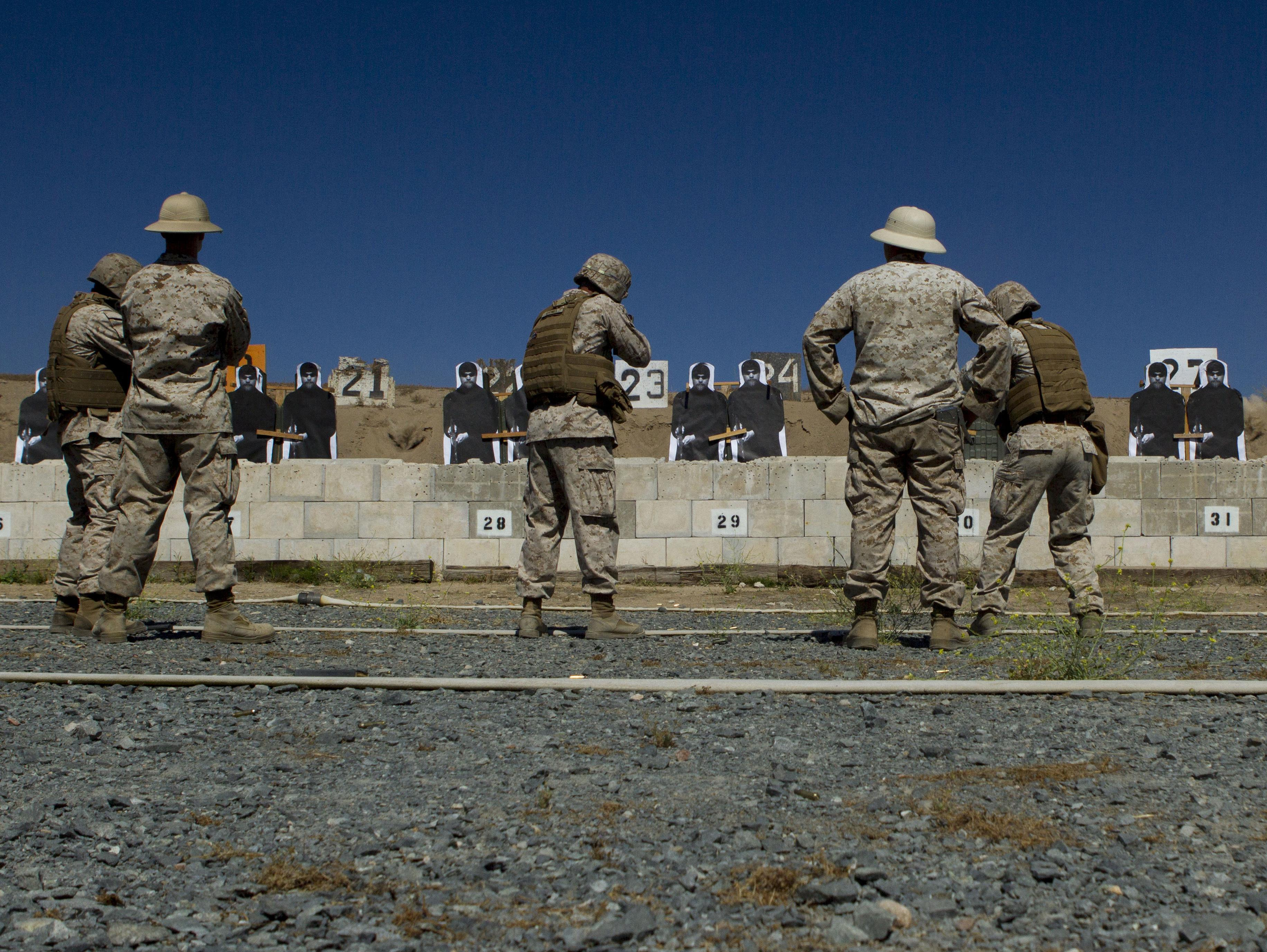
A USMC marksmanship instructor watching marksmen engage targets during the Combat Marksmanship Coaches Course at MCAS Miramar in 2015

== See also ==
- Hawley Products Company
- International Hat Company
- Jesse Hawley
- Sun helmet
- List of military equipment used in the Korean War
- List of United States Army military equipment of World War II
- Headgear of the United States Army

== Bibliography ==
- Lemons, Charles R. (2011). Uniforms of the US Army Ground Forces (1939–1945), Addendum. Raleigh, NC: Lulu Press. ISBN 978-1105268922.
- Suciu, Peter; Bates, Stuart (2009). Military Sun Helmets of the World (1st ed.). Uckfield, UK: Naval and Military Press. ISBN 9781894581523.
- Tulkoff, Alec (2003). Grunt Gear: USMC Combat Infantry Equipment of World War II. San Jose, CA: R. James Bender Publishing. ISBN 0912138920.
