= Hawley Products Company =

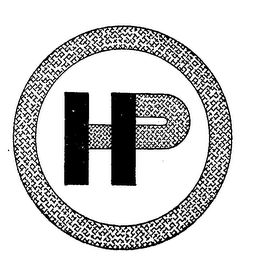

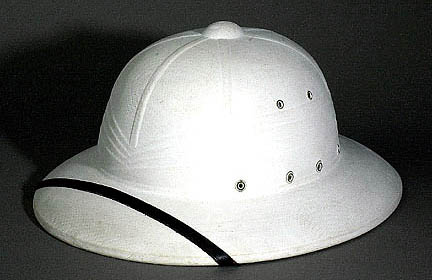
- President Harry S. Truman's sun helmet, made by Hawley Products.
- Type: Private
- Industry: Manufacturing
- Founded: 1917; Geneva, Illinois, U.S.A.
- Founder: Jesse Barnum Hawley, Senior
- Headquarters: 1567 North 8th Street, Paducah, Kentucky, U.S.A.
- Key people: Todd Yocum (President), Don Hawley (President)
- Products: M1 steel helmet liners, military sun helmets, globes, suitcases, furniture, fish tackling, loudspeakers
- Brands: Hawlite; Microbolic; Kurvabolic
- Parent: Hitco Carbon Composites

Hawley Products Company is a manufacturer of loudspeaker components. The company is the oldest manufacturer of loudspeaker diaphragms in the world. Historically, the company produced a variety of products composed of fibrous or plastic materials, including helmets, globes, microwave trays, automotive components, suitcases, and furniture. Most notably, the company is remembered for its World War II military helmets and helmet liners used by soldiers in the United States Army, Marines, and Navy. Hawley Products is the original designer of the M1 steel helmet liner. The company is also one of the two original manufacturers of the M1 steel helmet liner, alongside General Fibre Company. Additionally, Hawley Products designed and manufactured several versions of the pressed fiber military sun helmet used by the US military during World War II. The military continued to use this sun helmet throughout most of the 20th century, including Naval personnel during the Persian Gulf War.

== History ==
=== First location and early company history ===
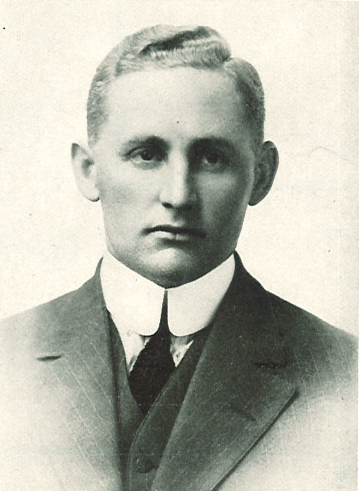
Jesse Hawley was President of Hawley Products and an inventor of several products composed of pressed fiber. In particular, Hawley invented the military sun helmet design adopted by the US military in 1940 that was used in World War II by hundreds of thousands of soldiers.

The company was founded in 1917 in Geneva, Illinois, by Jesse Hawley. However, Hawley's participation in the company was limited in the early years of the company due to the shifting commitments of Hawley's college football coaching career. The company was incorporated following Hawley's years coaching football at the University of Iowa from 1910 to 1915. Subsequently, two years into the company's founding, Hawley accepted an adviser role with Dartmouth's football program in 1919. This eventually led to his promotion to head coach of the Dartmouth football team from 1923 to 1928, a position he accepted for free without salary.

Hawley Products built the Newcomb Hawley factory in St. Charles, Illinois at 333 North 6th Street. The factory also served as the headquarters of the company, which produced military sun helmets and M1 steel helmet liners for the US military during World War II.

Under Jesse Hawley, the company invested heavily in research and innovation. During the 1930s, Jesse and his brother Don Hawley personally designed and patented products for the company. Dr. John C. Williams headed the Hawley Products research division in the 1940s and 1950s.

=== New markets, expansion, and acquisition ===
Jesse Hawley managed the company until his death in 1946, at which time his brother and fellow executive, Don M. Hawley, became president of Hawley Products. Don Hawley was also an inventor of several of the products and methods of production at the company. By 1946, Hawley Products had expanded its product lines into plastics, sound diaphragms, molded fiber, and filters.

In 1967, Hawley Products was acquired by Hitco Inc.

=== Recent operations ===
In 1984, Hawley Products relocated to Paducah, Kentucky from St. Charles, Illinois. The company moved into a new 74,000 square foot facility, focusing on the production of paper and cloth components for loudspeakers. Hawley Products presently produces surrounds, spiders, and diaphragms. The diaphragms include paper, kevlar, carbon fiber, and polypropylene based versions.

== Products ==
=== Helmets ===
==== Sun helmet ====
In 1935, Jesse Hawley invented and patented a tropical shaped, fiber pressed, commercial sun helmet. Although Hawley's helmet was originally designed for civilian use, including being marketed to the Boy Scouts of America (BSA) as the Hawley trooper. Although the Hawley trooper was directly sold to Scouts by the BSA, the sun hat never replaced the official Scout hat.

The United States military adopted the sun helmet design in 1940. Hawley Products and the International Hat Company won military contracts to manufacture hundreds of thousands of the pressed fiber sun helmet.

==== M1 helmet liner ====
The original design for the M1 helmet was approved by the United States military on June 9, 1941. The helmet shell, known as the Hadfield manganese steel helmet, was first manufactured by the McCord Radiator Company, whereas the fiber liner interior was designed and produced by Hawley Products Company. The purpose of the Hawley liner was to serve as a cushion between the wearer and the steel shell. The fiber material interior consisted of a finished green cardboard, with an interior suspension. The interior suspension was shaped as a webbed crossing pattern.

== See also ==
- International Hat Company
- General Fibre Company
- Sun helmet

== Bibliography and further reading ==
- Hull, Callie (1946). Industrial Research Laboratories of the United States: Including Consulting Research Laboratories. Washington D.C.: National Academies.
- Lemons, Charles (2016). Uniforms of the U.S. Army Ground Forces 1939 – 1945. Raleigh, North Carolina: Lulu Press. ISBN 9781365133299.
- Norton, Bryan R. (1974). Engineering Applications of Composites: Composite Materials. Elsevier. ISBN 9781483216690.
- Pitkin, Thomas M. (1944). Quartermaster Equipment for Special Forces. Historical Section, Office of the Quartermaster General.
- Shaw, Henry I. (1991). Opening Moves: Marines Gear Up for War Marines in World War II commemorative series. Collingdale, Pennsylvania: DIANE Publishing. ISBN 9780788135279.
- Suciu, Peter; Bates, Stuart (2010). Military Sun Helmets of the World (2nd ed.). Uckfield, UK: Naval and Military Press. ISBN 9781894581523.
- Tulkoff, Alec (2003). Grunt Gear: USMC Combat Infantry Equipment of World War II. San Jose, CA: R. James Bender Publishing. ISBN 0912138920.
