= 1928 Dartmouth Indians football team =

American college football season

1928 Dartmouth Indians football
- Conference: Independent
- Record: 5–4
- Head coach: Jesse Hawley (6th season)
- Captain: Richard Black
- Home stadium: Memorial Field

1928 Eastern college football independents records
	Conf.			Overall
Team	W	L	T	W		L		T
Boston College		–		9	–	0	–	0
West Chester		–		8	–	0	–	0
Villanova		–		7	–	0	–	1
Brown		–		8	–	1	–	0
No. 11 Penn		–		8	–	1	–	0
No. 6 Carnegie Tech		–		7	–	1	–	0
No. 9 Army		–		8	–	2	–	0
Drexel		–		8	–	2	–	0
No. 10 NYU		–		8	–	2	–	0
Temple		–		7	–	1	–	2
Lafayette		–		6	–	1	–	2
Princeton		–		5	–	1	–	2
CCNY		–		4	–	1	–	2
Pittsburgh		–		6	–	2	–	1
Harvard		–		5	–	2	–	1
Tufts		–		5	–	2	–	1
Colgate		–		6	–	3	–	0
Rutgers		–		6	–	3	–	0
Bucknell		–		5	–	2	–	3
Columbia		–		5	–	3	–	1
Boston University		–		3	–	3	–	2
Cornell		–		3	–	3	–	2
Syracuse		–		4	–	4	–	1
Yale		–		4	–	4	–	0
Fordham		–		4	–	5	–	0
Franklin & Marshall		–		4	–	5	–	0
Penn State		–		3	–	5	–	1
Lehigh		–		3	–	6	–	0
Washington & Jefferson		–		2	–	5	–	2
Providence		–		1	–	5	–	3
Vermont		–		1	–	7	–	2
Rankings from Dickinson System

The 1928 Dartmouth Indians football team was an American football team that represented Dartmouth College as an independent during the 1928 college football season. In their sixth and final season under head coach Jesse Hawley, the Indians compiled a 5–4 record. Richard Black was the team captain.

Al Marsters was the team's leading scorer, with 67 points, from 11 touchdowns and one kicked extra point.

Dartmouth played its home games at Memorial Field on the college campus in Hanover, New Hampshire.

== Schedule ==
Date	Opponent	Site	Result	Attendance	Source
September 29	Norwich	Memorial Field; Hanover, NH	W 39–6		
October 6	Hobart	Memorial Field; Hanover, NH	W 44–0		
October 13	Allegheny	Memorial Field; Hanover, NH	W 37–12		
October 20	Columbia	Memorial Field; Hanover, NH	W 21–7		
October 27	at Harvard	Harvard Stadium; Boston, MA (rivalry)	L 7–19	53,000	
November 3	at Yale	Yale Bowl; New Haven, CT	L 0–18	45,000	
November 10	Brown	Memorial Field; Hanover, NH	L 0–14		
November 17	at Cornell	Schoellkopf Field; Ithaca, NY (rivalry)	W 28–0		
November 24	at Northwestern	Dyche Stadium; Evanston, IL	L 6–27	45,000	
