= Jesse Hawley (American football) =

American football player and coach

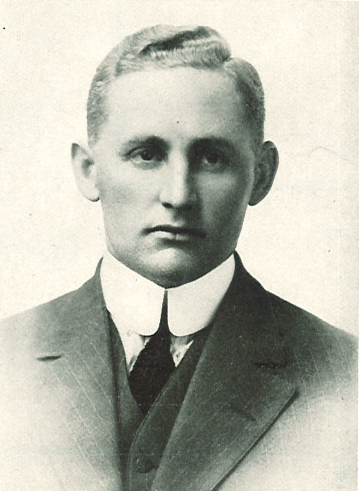
- Hawley from 1912 Hawkeye

Biographical details
- Born: March 25, 1887; Saint Paul, Minnesota, U.S.
- Died: March 21, 1946 (aged 59); Orlando, Florida, U.S.

Playing career
- 1907–1908: Dartmouth
- Position: Back

Coaching career (HC unless noted)
- 1910–1915: Iowa
- 1919: Dartmouth (adviser)
- 1920: Princeton (assistant)
- 1923–1928: Dartmouth

Head coaching record
- Overall: 63–28–1

Accomplishments and honors

Championships
- 1 National (1925)

Jesse Barnum Hawley Jr. (March 25, 1887 – March 21, 1946) was an American football coach, inventor, and president of Hawley Products Company. He was the head coach at the University of Iowa from 1910 to 1915 and at Dartmouth College from 1923 to 1928, compiling a career college football record of 63–28–1. Hawley was the tenth head coach in Iowa football history and led Dartmouth to a national championship in 1925. In 1935, Hawley developed a tropical pressed fiber sun helmet that was adopted in 1940 by the United States military. Approximately 250,000 of Hawley's military sun helmets were produced during World War II by Hawley Products Company and the International Hat Company.

== Coaching career ==
=== Iowa ===
Hawley was hired by the University of Iowa as its tenth head football coach in 1910. Iowa had not won the conference title in a decade, and Hawkeye fans were hoping Hawley could turn Iowa's fortunes around. School officials also hired Nelson A. Kellogg in 1910 to be Iowa's athletic director. Supervision of intercollegiate athletics at Iowa had, since 1900, also been the responsibility of the head coach. Hawley, however, could focus solely on coaching the football team.

Hawley's Hawkeyes had a 5–2 record in 1910. The most notable game that season was a loss to the Missouri Tigers. Before traveling to Columbia for the game, Hawley was warned not to take Archie Alexander, Iowa's talented black tackle, along for the game. Fearing troubles similar to what Frank Holbrook, Iowa's first black football player, encountered in a game against Missouri in 1896, Hawley agreed to leave Alexander behind. When the Iowa team arrived in Columbia, a mob of local townspeople met the team to ensure that Alexander was not with them. In view of the racial incidents as well as the unsportsmanlike treatment Hawkeye players received during the game, Hawley vowed that Iowa would never again play Missouri in football as long as he was the coach. It has been longer than that. The two neighboring state universities did not meet again until the Insight Bowl in 2010.

A 1–3 start was cause for concern in 1911, but Iowa finished the year strong and had a solid 4–3 record in 1912. The biggest win of the 1912 season was a 20–7 victory over Iowa State, the last Iowa State team to win a conference title. It was also the final loss in the coaching career of Clyde Williams, a former Iowa football star.

Hawley was poised to field his best Iowa team in 1913. The 1913 Hawkeyes had a 5–2 record and easily led the nation in scoring. Only a loss to Chicago kept Iowa from the Western Conference title. However, Iowa responded the following week with a 78–6 victory over Northwestern, the team that cost Iowa a share of the Western Conference title in 1910. Iowa's 78 points is the most ever surrendered by a Northwestern team, and the 72-point loss is the second largest defeat in Northwestern school history. The Hawkeyes also defeated Cornell College, 76–0, and Indiana, 60–0. Iowa's 45–7 win over Iowa State was the most lopsided in series history at the time and was Iowa's first Homecoming win.

Iowa defeated Northern Iowa, 95–0, to open the 1914 season under Hawley. It is the largest margin of victory in Iowa history and easily Northern Iowa's biggest loss. However, many fans were critical of Iowa's win, stating that winning 95–0 did little to prepare Iowa for the rest of the season. They may have been correct; Iowa lost consecutive conference games by 7–0 scores to knock the Hawkeyes from the conference race yet again.

Iowa started 3–0 in 1915, but Iowa lost the final four games of the season, and criticism of Hawley mounted. Specifically, eleven of the best players in the Western Conference were Iowans playing for other member schools. Undefeated Minnesota started four Iowans, Chicago and Northwestern each started three, and the star of the 1915 Wisconsin team was an Iowan as well. Five Iowans earned all-conference honors in 1915, and only one played for Iowa. In addition, Hawley only coached and lived in Iowa City during the season, and many Hawkeye fans felt the program needed a "full-time" coach. As a result, Hawley resigned after the 1915 season.

Hawley had a 24–18 record at Iowa. He was said to be a quiet, reserved coach who believed in fundamentals and attention to detail. He was also considered to be a brilliant offensive coach who guided Iowa to some of the most lopsided wins in school history.

=== Dartmouth ===
When Hawley resigned at Iowa, he stated that he wanted to spend more time with his investment business. He was a successful investor and businessman before he arrived at Iowa. Hawley, a Dartmouth College graduate, returned to Hanover and continued his business after leaving Iowa in 1915.

In 1923, Dartmouth's football team needed a head coach, and Hawley took the job and stayed for six years. Successful in private enterprise, he volunteered his services and coached his alma mater for free.

Under Hawley, Dartmouth went 22 games without a loss from 1923 to 1926. Hawley reached the pinnacle of success in 1925, when he led Dartmouth to an undefeated 8–0 season, for which Dartmouth claims the national championship. Other than two national titles claimed by Princeton in the 1930s under Fritz Crisler, the 1925 Dartmouth national title is the last claimed by an Ivy League school.

== Head coaching record ==
Year	Team	Overall	Conference	Standing	Bowl/playoffs
Iowa Hawkeyes (Western Conference / Missouri Valley Intercollegiate Athletic Association) (1910)
1910	Iowa	5–2	1–1 / 3–1	4th / 2nd	
Iowa Hawkeyes (Western Conference) (1911–1915)
1911	Iowa	3–4	2–2	T–4th	
1912	Iowa	4–3	1–3	7th	
1913	Iowa	5–2	2–1	T–2nd	
1914	Iowa	4–3	1–2	7th	
1915	Iowa	3–4	1–2	7th	
Iowa:		24–18	8–11 / 3–1		
Dartmouth Indians (Independent) (1923–1928)
1923	Dartmouth	8–1			
1924	Dartmouth	7–0–1			
1925	Dartmouth	8–0			
1926	Dartmouth	4–4			
1927	Dartmouth	7–1			
1928	Dartmouth	5–4			
Dartmouth:		39–10–1			
Total:		63–28–1			
National championship Conference title Conference division title or championship game berth
