= Peregrine =

Peregrine(s), or (Latin) Peregrinus may refer to:

== The arts ==
=== Fictional characters ===
- Peregrine (name)#Fictional characters

=== Other uses in the arts ===
- Passing of Peregrinus, a 2nd-century satire by Lucian
- "The Peregrin", a story in The Psychotechnic League series
- "Peregrine", a song by Donovan on the 1968 album The Hurdy Gurdy Man
- The Peregrine, 1967 book by J. A. Baker on peregrine falcons
- Peregrine (album), 2006, by the Appleseed Cast
- Peregrine (band), Australian indie rock band
- "Peregrines", a 2004 short story by Suzy McKee Charnas
- Tonus Peregrinus, a British vocal ensemble
- Tonus peregrinus, reciting tone in Gregorian chant

== Biology ==
=== Genera and species ===
- Peregrine falcon, a bird of prey
- Peregrinus (planthopper), a genus of planthoppers in the family Delphacidae
- Erigeron peregrinus, a flowering plant of the daisy family
- Nicodamus peregrinus, the red and black spider
- Pinus peregrinus, an extinct species of pine
- Platycorynus peregrinus, a species of beetle
- Pseudocheirus peregrinus, the common ringtail possum

== Companies ==
- Peregrine Corporation, an Australian company
- Peregrine Financial Group, an American futures brokerage firm
- Peregrine Holdings Limited, a company traded on the Johannesburg Securities Exchange
- Peregrine Investments Holdings, a Hong Kong investment company
- Peregrine Semiconductor, an American fabless semiconductor company
- Peregrine Systems, a software company

== People ==
- Peregrine (name), a list of people with the single or given name, or surname, Peregrine or Peregrinus

== Places ==
- Peregrinus Peak, an Antarctic peak
- Mons Peregrinus, or the Citadel of Raymond de Saint-Gilles

== Transportation ==
- LNER Class A4 60034 Lord Faringdon, a steam locomotive that was at one point named Peregrine
- MC 55A Peregrine, a model of aircraft
- MV Peregrine, a British ship
- Peregrine Mission One, a lunar lander designed by Astrobotic Technology
- Rolls-Royce Peregrine, an aero engine
- USS Peregrine (AM-373), a U.S. Navy ship

== Other uses ==
- Operation Peregrine, a 2003 Canadian military operation
- Peregrine, a term in astrology for a planet with no essential dignity
- Peregrine (horse) (1878 – c. 1898), British racehorse, winner of the 2000 Guineas in 1881
- Peregrine (journal), full title: Peregrine: American Immigration in the 21st Century, an online journal on immigration to the US
- Peregrine Mission One, an unsuccessful American lunar lander mission
- Peregrinus (Roman), a designation for a non-citizen subject of the Roman empire

== See also ==
- Pellegrino (disambiguation)
- The Peregrine Fund, a bird conservation organization
- The Peregrine Way, 2010 album by metal band Viathyn
- El Peregrino, a settlement in General Pinto Partido, Argentina
- Pilgrim, derived from the Latin peregrinus
- St Peregrine's GAA, a Gaelic athletic club
