= Bract =

Modified or specialized leaf

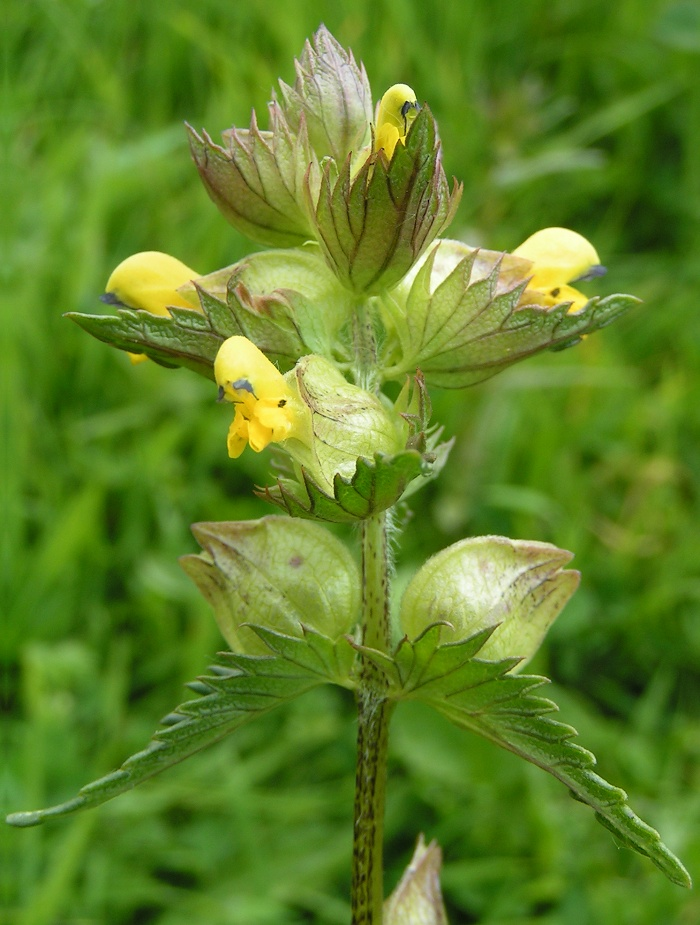
Papery (upper) and leafy bracts on Rhinanthus minor (hay rattle). All the "leaves" in this image are bracts.

In botany, a bract is a modified or specialized leaf, associated with a reproductive structure such as a flower, inflorescence axis or cone scale. Bracts are usually different from foliage leaves in size, color, shape or texture. They also look different from the parts of the flower, such as the petals or sepals.

A plant having bracts is referred to as bracteate or bracteolate, while one that lacks them is referred to as ebracteate or ebracteolate.

== Variants ==
Some bracts are brightly coloured which aid in the attraction of pollinators, either together with the perianth or instead of it. Examples of this type of bract include those of Euphorbia pulcherrima (poinsettia) and Bougainvillea: both of these have large colourful bracts surrounding much smaller, less colourful flowers.

In grasses, each floret (flower) is enclosed in a pair of papery bracts, called the lemma (lower bract) and palea (upper bract), while each spikelet (group of florets) has a further pair of bracts at its base called glumes. These bracts form the chaff that is usually removed from cereal grain during threshing and winnowing.

Bats may detect acoustic signals from dish-shaped bracts such as those of Marcgravia evenia.

A prophyll is a leaf-like structure, such as a bracteole, subtending (extending under) a single flower or pedicel. The term can also mean the lower bract on a peduncle.

The frequently showy pair of bracts of Euphorbia species in subgenus Lacanthis are the cyathophylls.

Bracts subtend the cone scales in the seed cones of many conifers, and in some cases, such as Pseudotsuga, extend beyond the cone scales.

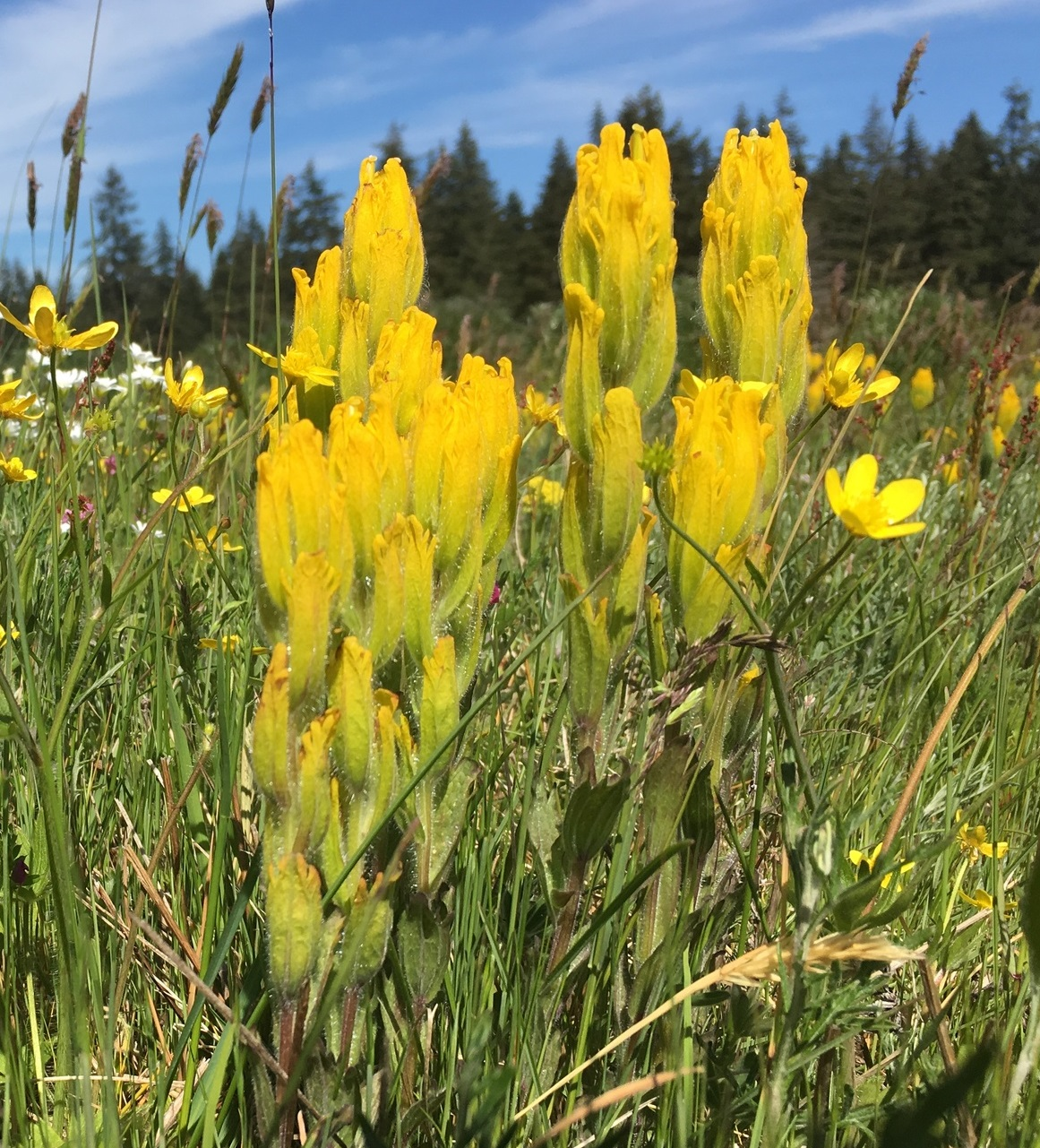
The yellow bracts of Castilleja levisecta press tight against the stem.

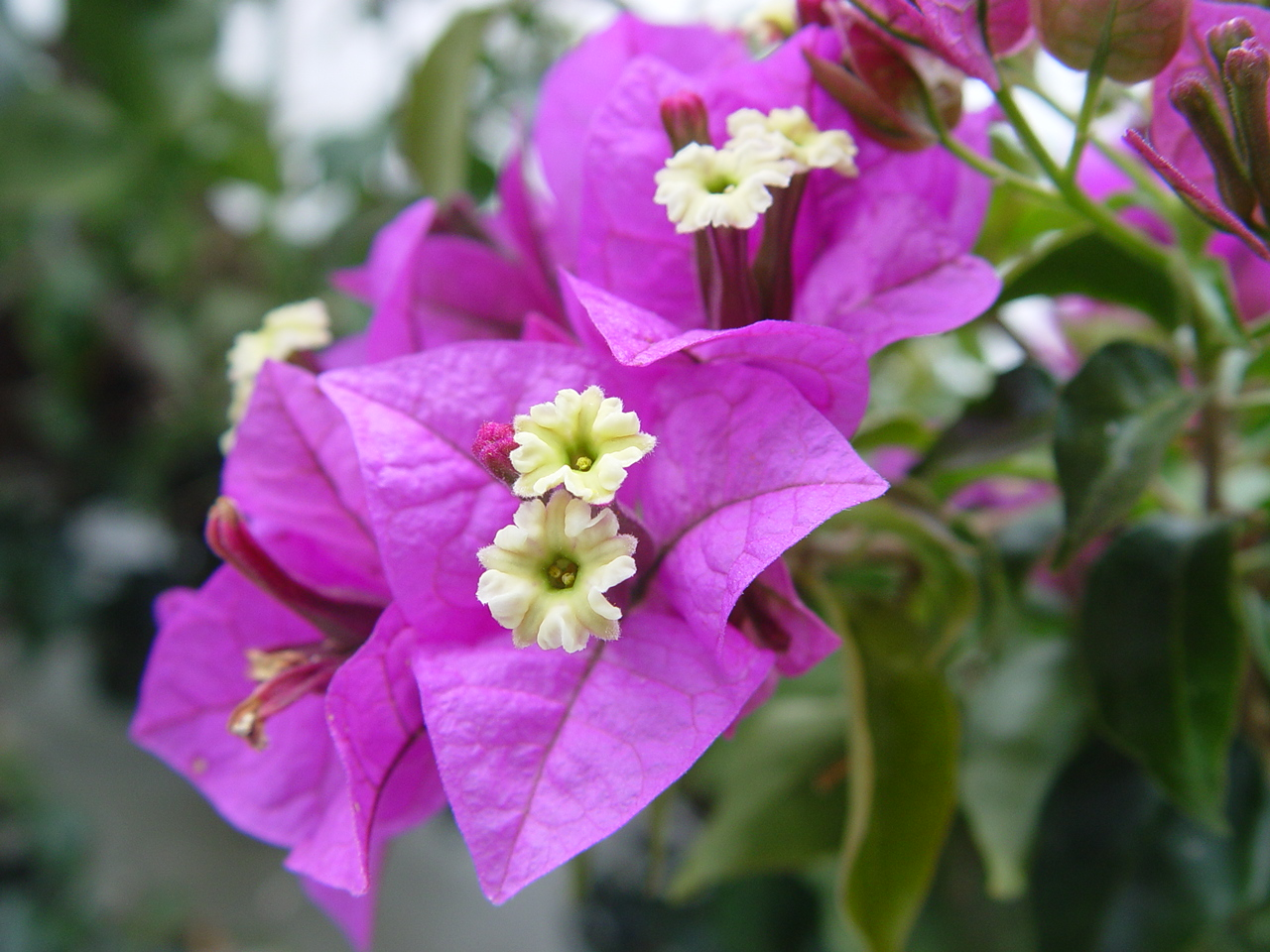
The bracts of Bougainvillea glabra, differ in colour from leaves and attract pollinators.

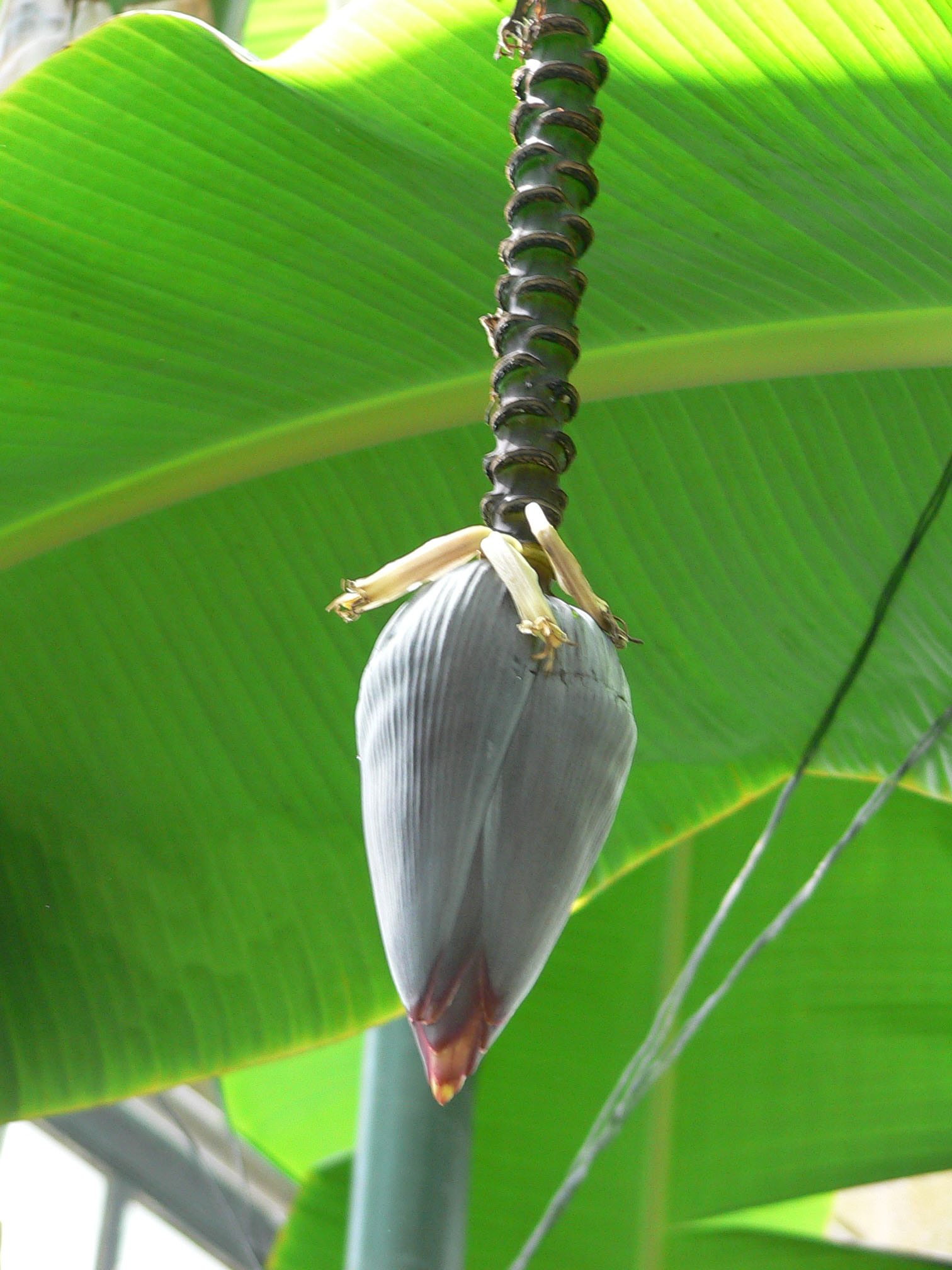
Bracts along a banana flower stalk surround rows of flowers

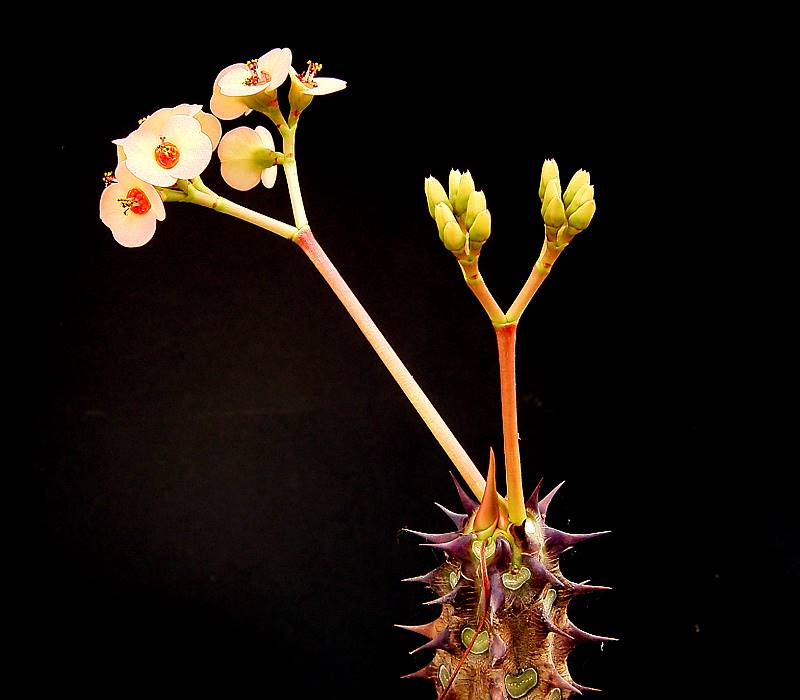
Euphorbia milii var. vulcanii cyathia bearing a pair of pinkish cyathophylls

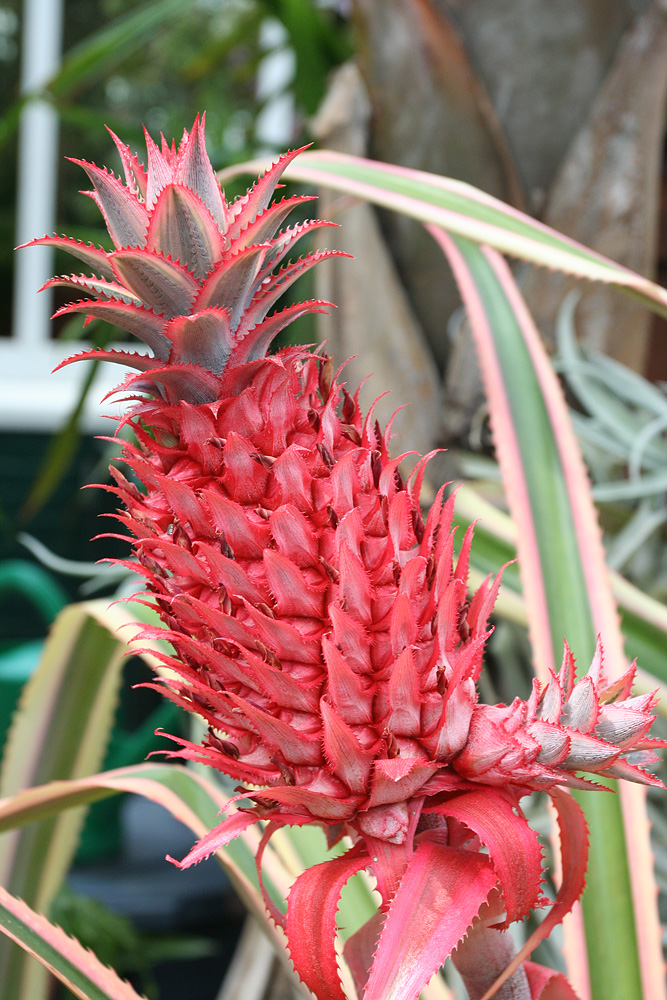
Colourful bracts of Ananas bracteatus

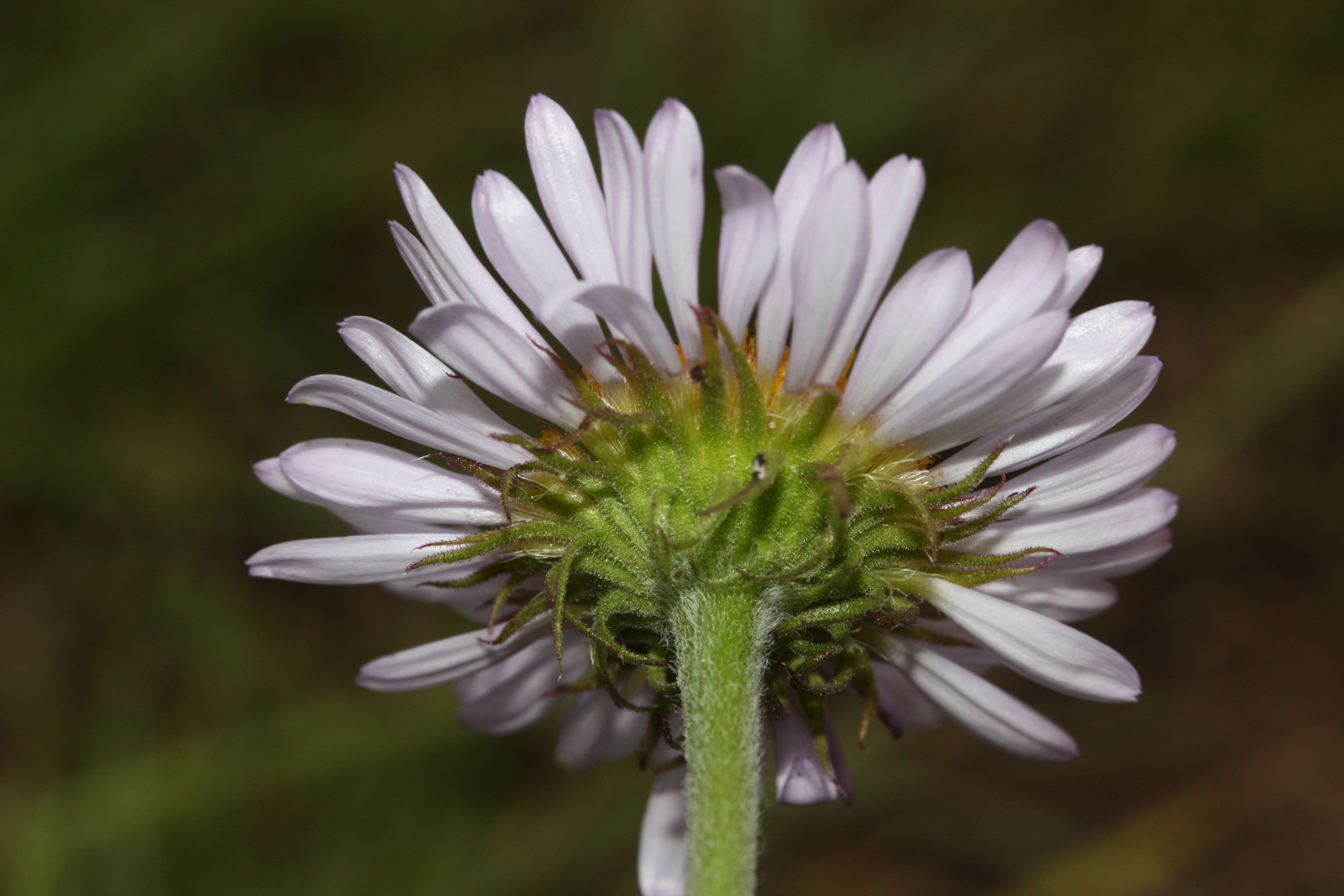
The many green involucral bracts of Erigeron peregrinus taper to a point and are linear, loose, and about the same length.

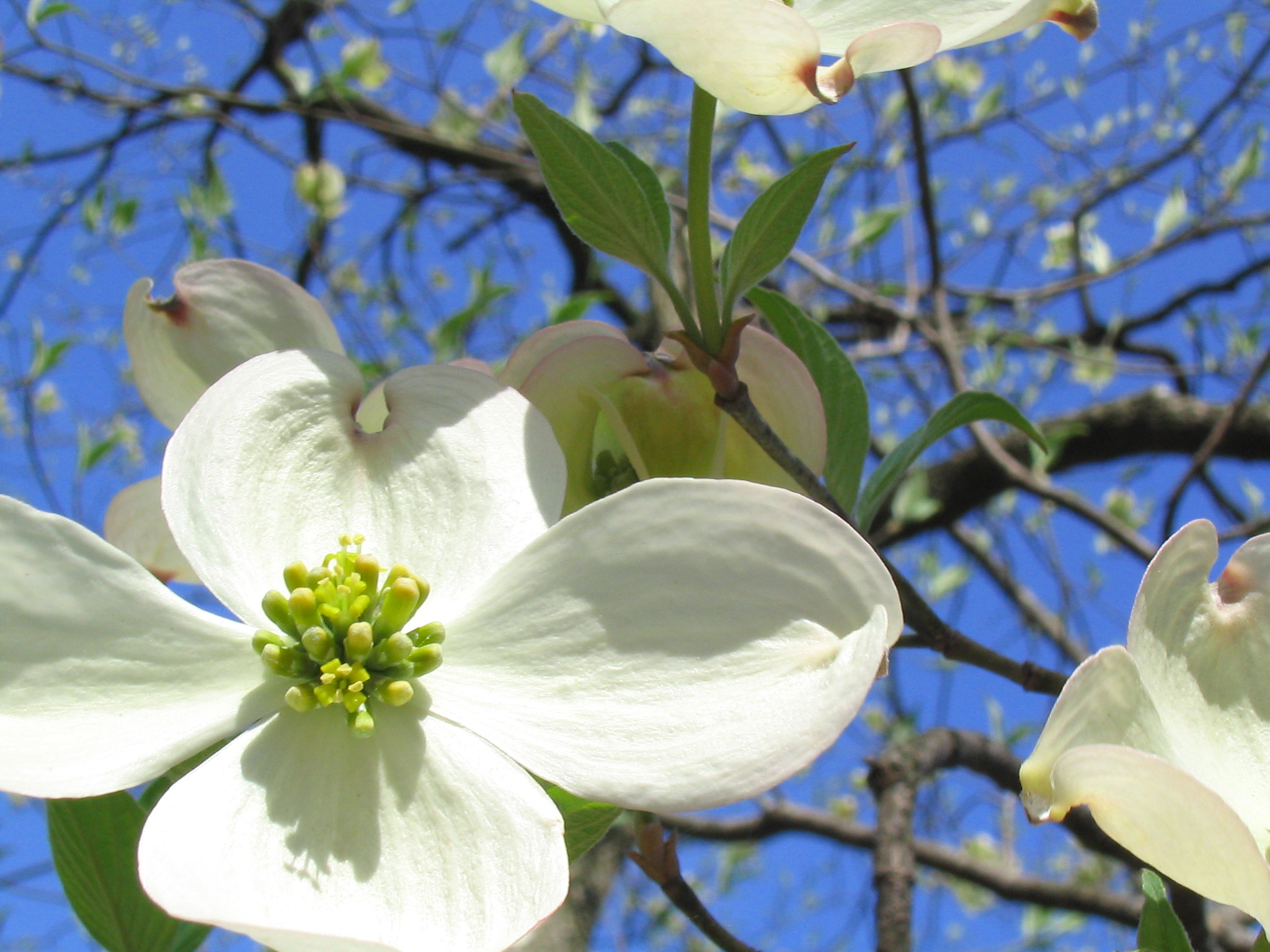
Dogwood species Cornus florida inflorescence showing four large white bracts and central flower cluster

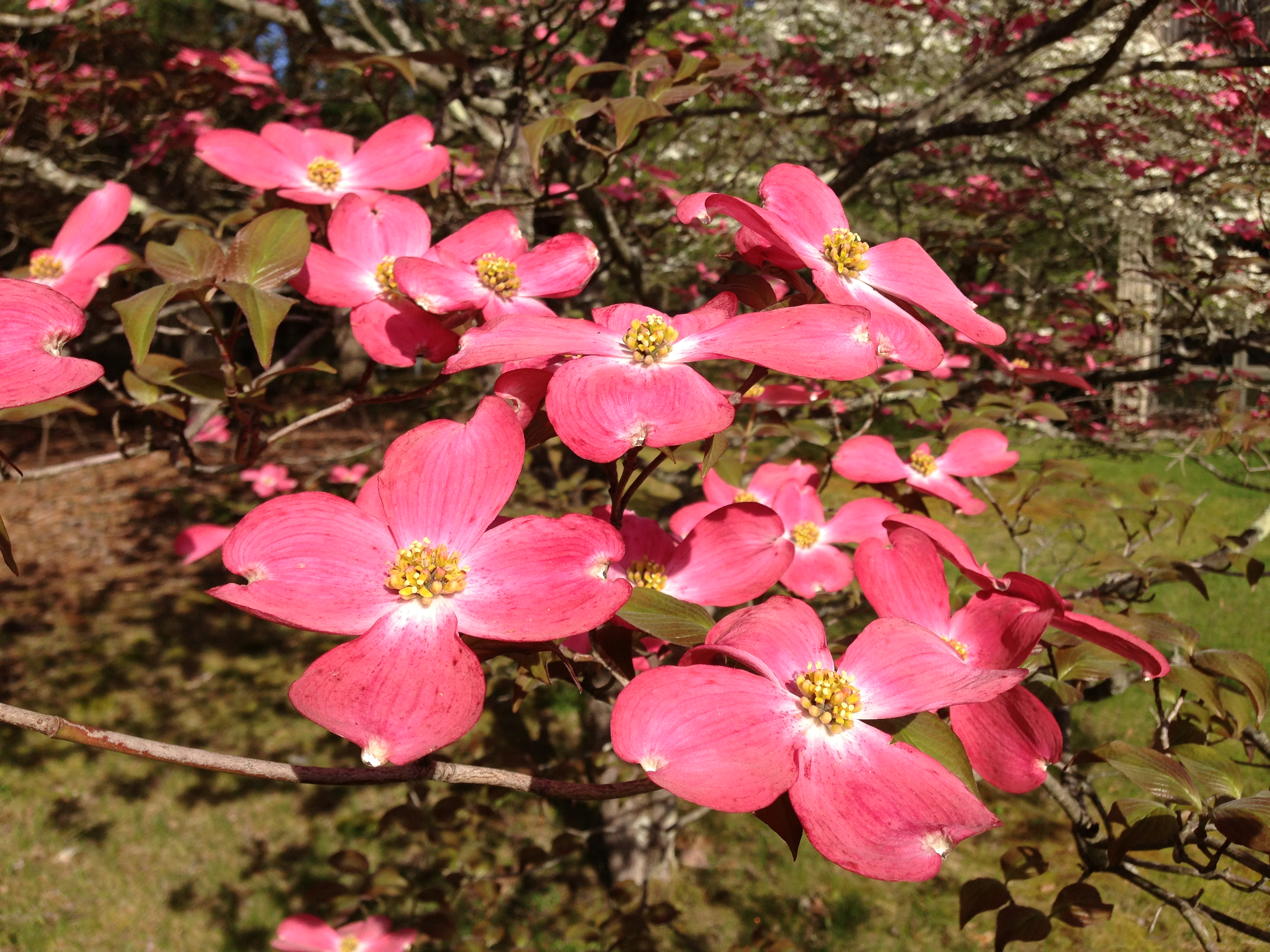
Cornus florida dogwood cultivar with pink bracts surrounding yellow florets

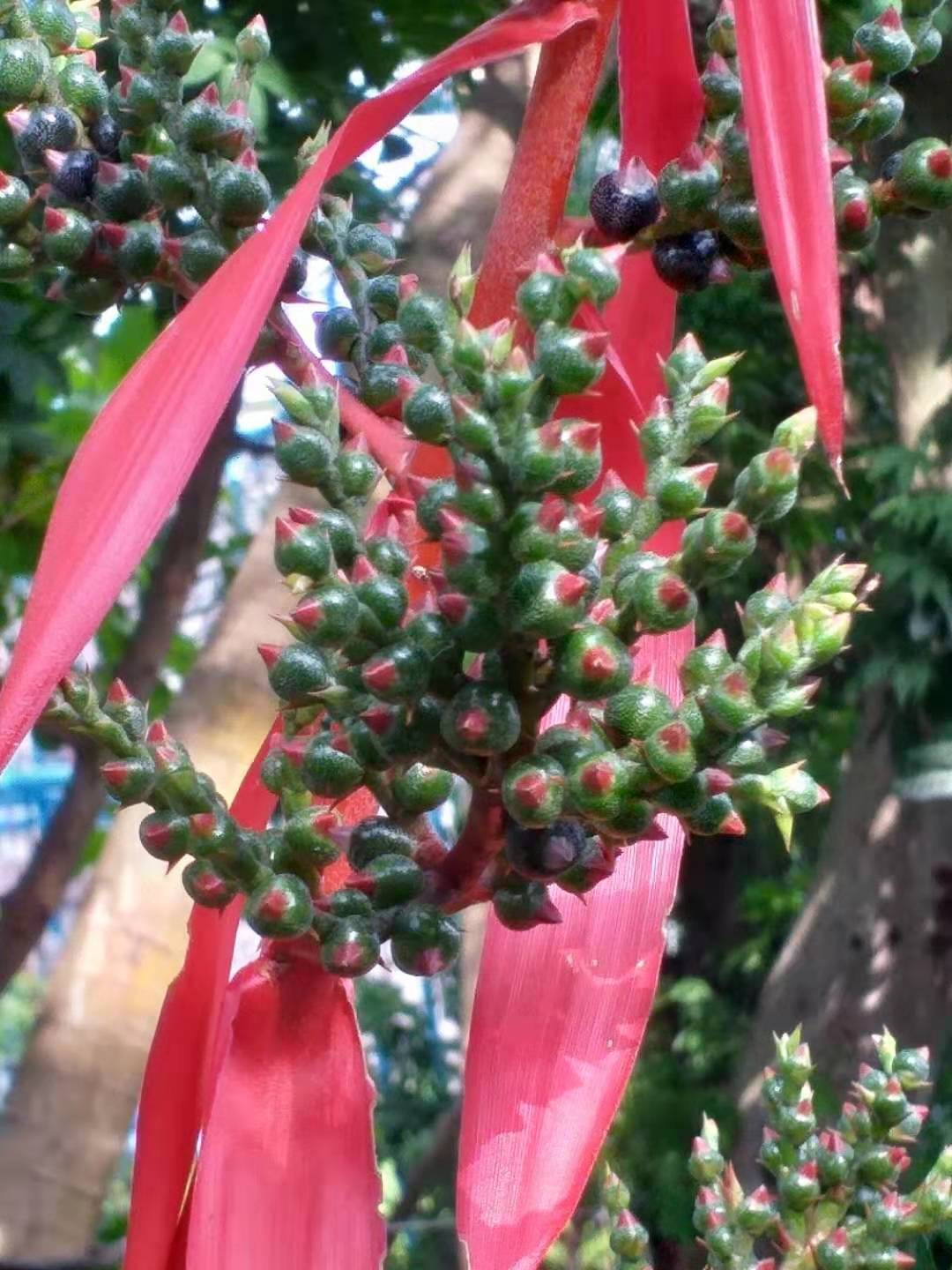
The red bracts of Aechmea bracteata

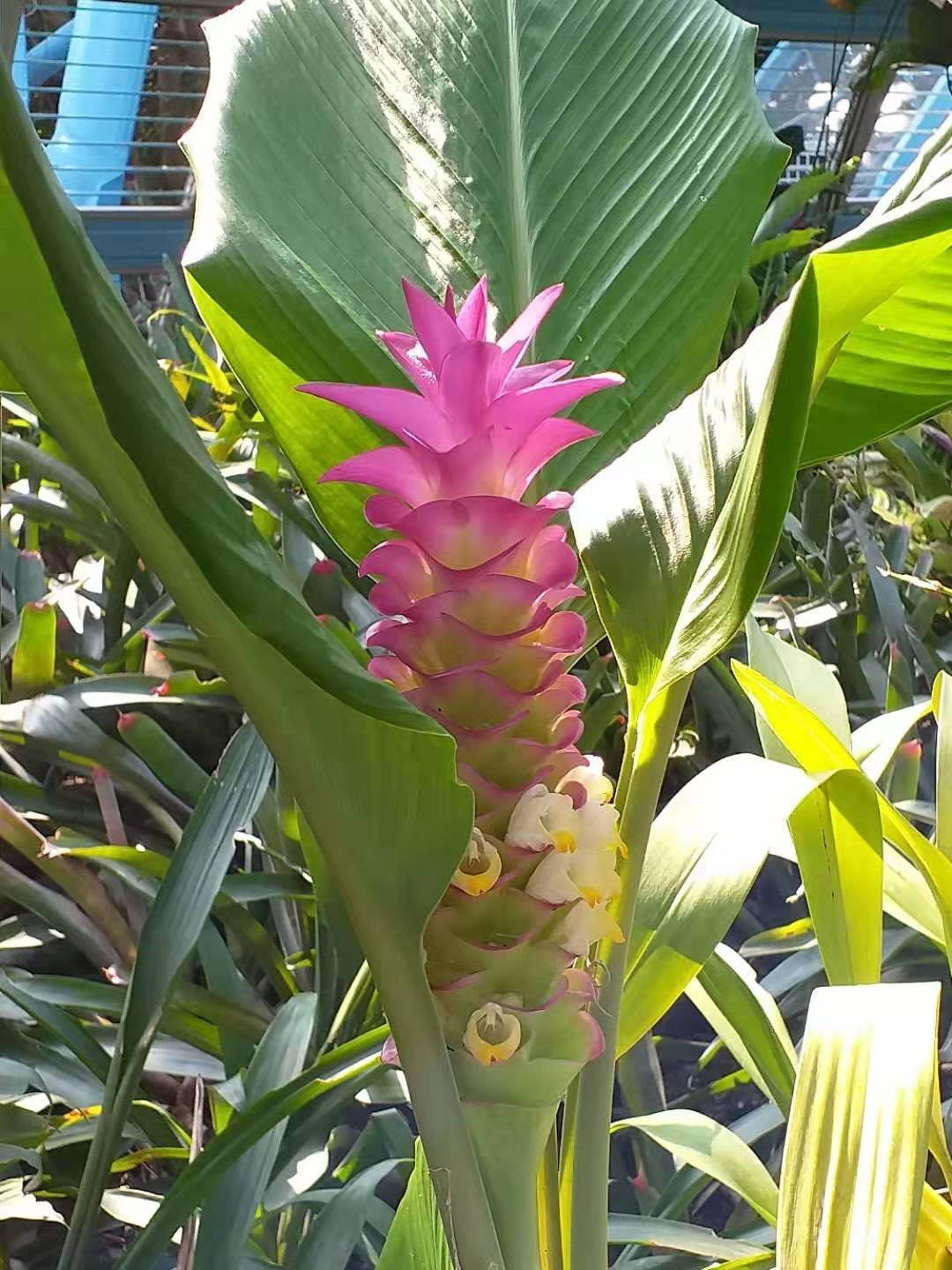
The pink bracts of Curcuma petiolata

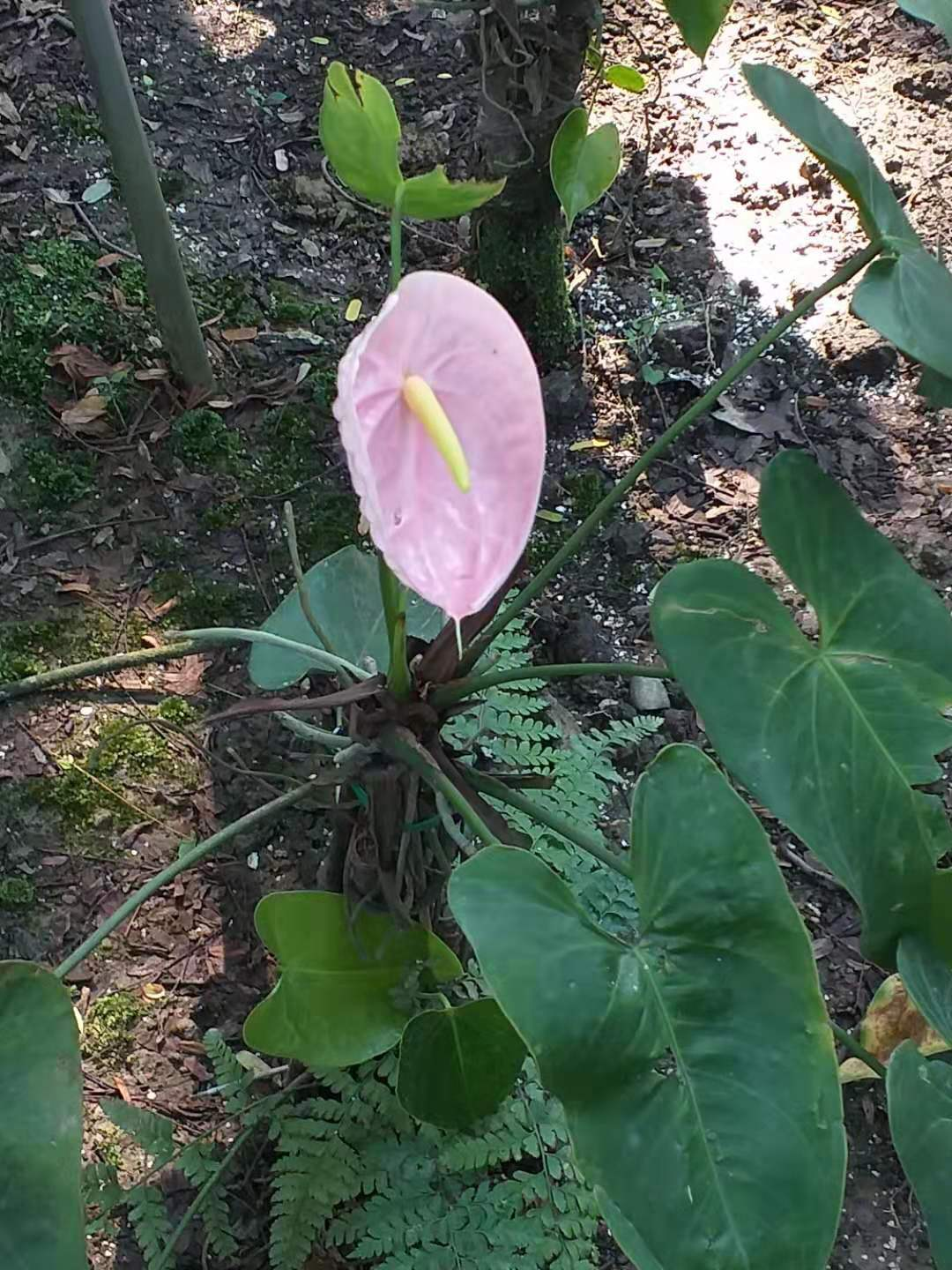
The pink bract of Anthurium andraeanum 'Pink Lady'

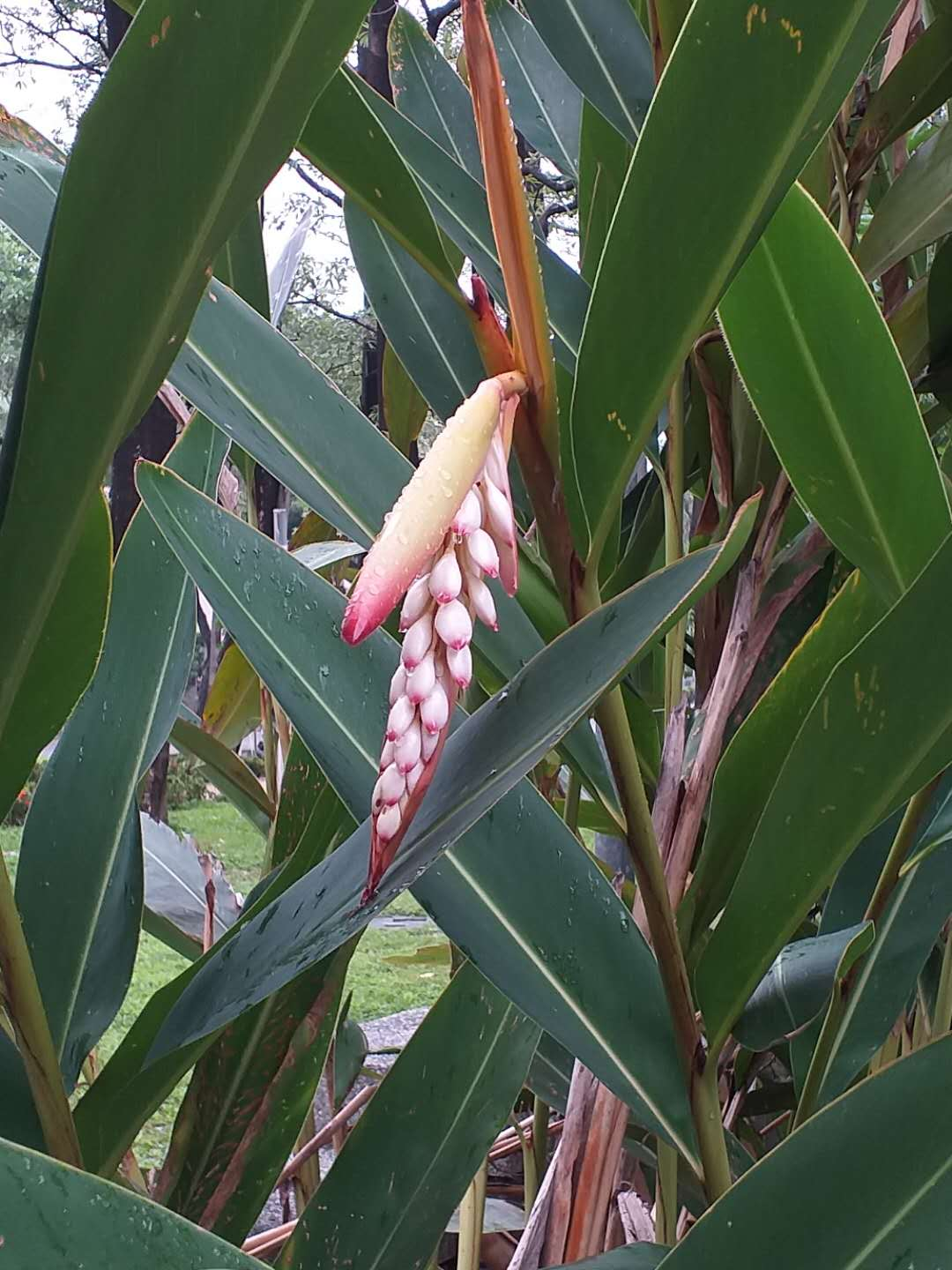
Alpinia zerumbet flower buds protected by two bracts

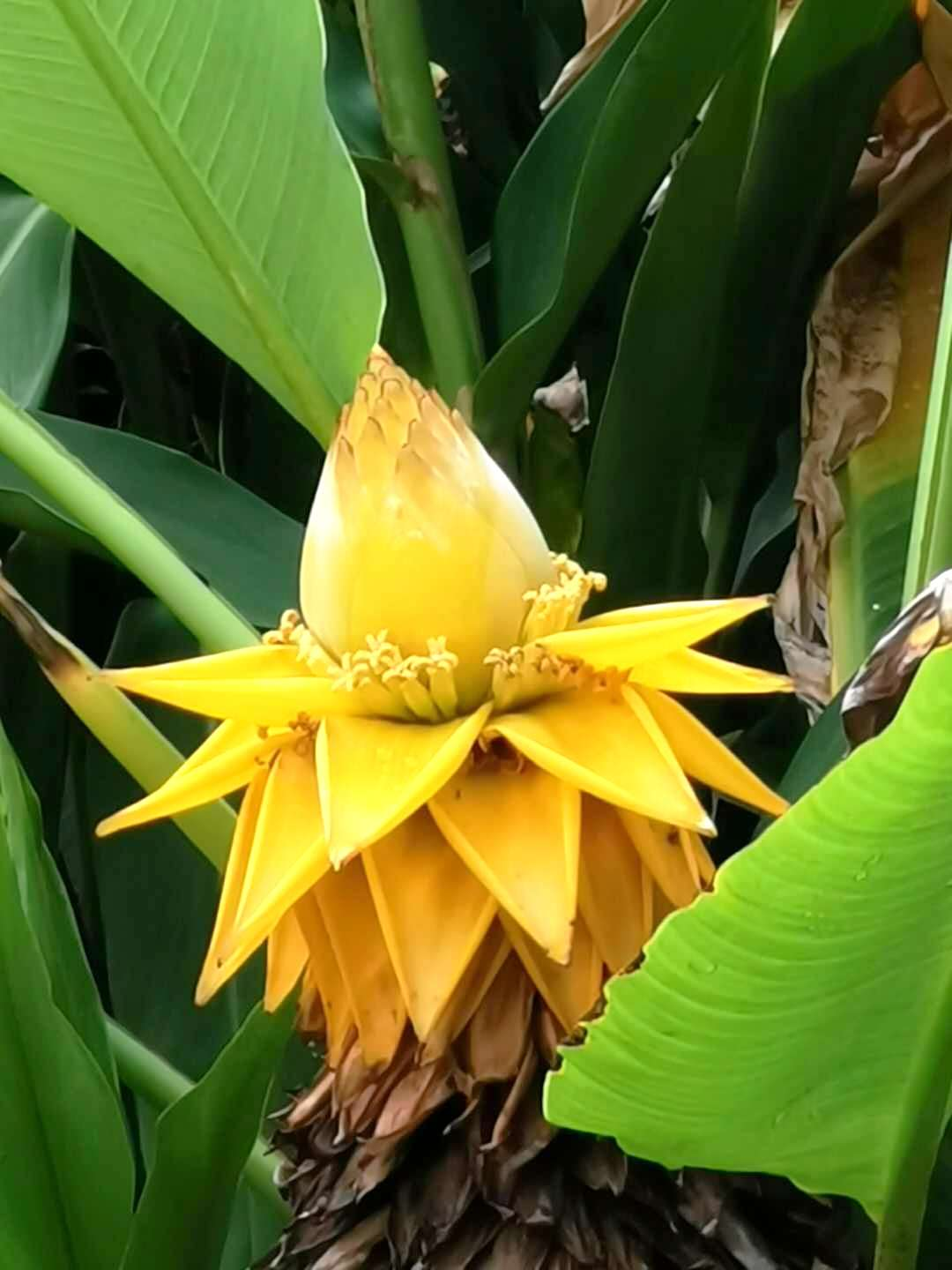
The golden bracts of Musella lasiocarpa

== Bracteole ==
A small bract is called a bracteole or bractlet. Technically this is any bract that arises on a pedicel instead of subtending it.

== Involucral bracts ==
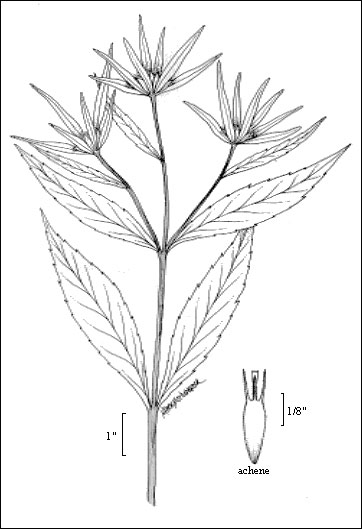
Beggar-tick (Bidens comosa)

Bracts that appear in a whorl subtending an inflorescence are collectively called an involucre. An involucre is a common feature beneath the inflorescences of many families, including the Apiaceae (carrot family), Asteraceae (sunflower or the daisy family), Dipsacaceae, and Polygonaceae. Each flower in an inflorescence may have its own whorl of bracts, in this case called an involucel. They can be called chaff, paleas or receptacular bracts and are usually minute scales or bristles. Many asteraceous plants have bracts at the base of each inflorescence.

The term involucre is also used for a highly conspicuous bract or bract pair at the base of an inflorescence. In the family Betulaceae, notably in the genera Carpinus and Corylus, the involucre is a leafy structure that protects the developing nuts. Beggar-tick (Bidens comosa) has narrow involucral bracts surrounding each inflorescence, each of which also has a single bract below it. There is then a pair of leafy bracts on the main stem and below those a pair of leaves.

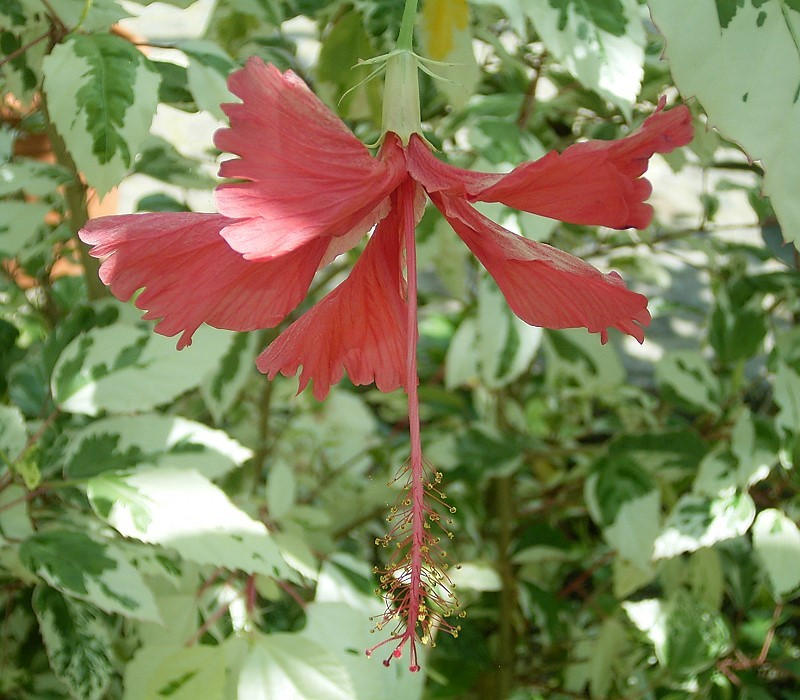
Epicalyx of Hibiscus rosa-sinensis

== Epicalyx ==
An epicalyx (which forms an additional whorl around the calyx of a single flower) is a modification of bracteoles. In other words, the epicalyx is a group of bracts resembling a calyx or bracteoles forming a whorl outer to the calyx. It is a calyx-like extra whorl of floral appendages. Each individual segment of the epicalyx is called an episepal because they resemble the sepals in them. They are present in the hibiscus family, Malvaceae. Fragaria (strawberries) may or may not have an epicalyx.

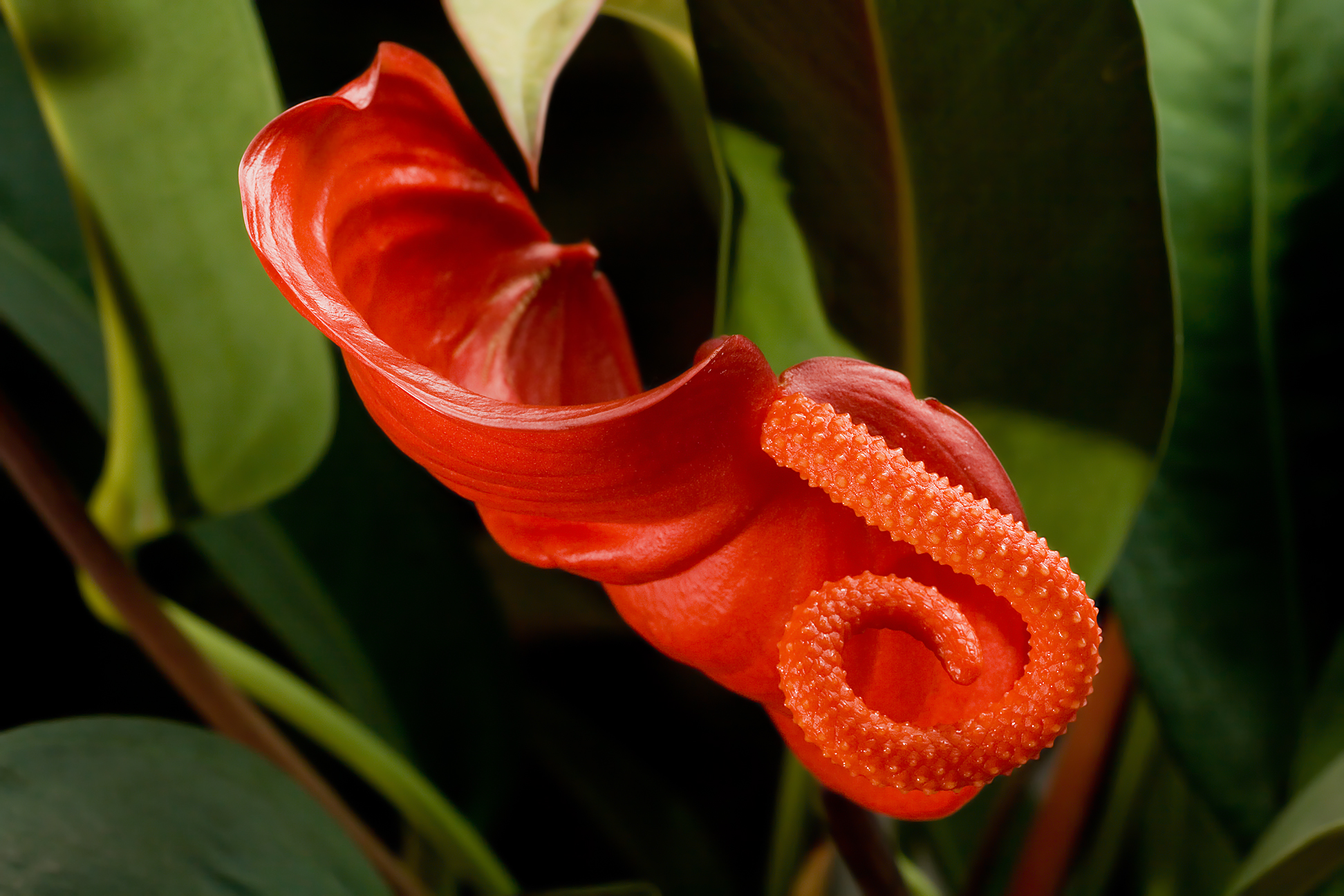
Anthurium scherzerianum inflorescence with spathe and spadix

== Spathe ==
A spathe is a large bract or a pair of bracts that forms a sheath to enclose the flower cluster of plants such as palms, arums, irises, crocuses and dayflowers (Commelina). Zephyranthes tubispatha in the Amaryllidaceae derives its specific name from its tubular spathe. In many arums (family Araceae), the spathe is petal-like, attracting pollinators to the flowers arranged on a type of spike called a spadix.

== See also ==
- Glossary of botanical terms
- Nectary
