= Peregrine (name) =

Peregrine, from the Latin Peregrinus is a given name and a surname. Other forms include Peregrino, Perregrine and Peregrin.

The word peregrine originally meant "foreign", from the Latin peregrinus. The term broadened to mean "wandering" or "travelling" from the habits of young peregrine falcons (falco peregrinus, meaning "pilgrim falcon" in Medieval Latin), which would travel long distances to find a suitable nesting place in a high place. The peregrine falcon was first named thus by English ornithologist Marmaduke Tunstall in 1771.

Peregrinus was the name of some early saints. The word passed into Old French as pelegrin (meaning "pilgrim"), which may also have been used in Middle English as a variant of pilgrim. Some French Huguenots who had moved to England by the 18th century bore the surname "Pelegrin".

The first records of the surname Peregrine in England are from Norfolk in the 13th century, where these Norman descendants held vast estates.

In the United States, Peregrine was the name chosen for the first English child born on Mayflower when it arrived in Provincetown. The name is not a common one these days.

People with the name Peregrine or Peregrinus include:

== Single name ==
- Cetteus or Peregrinus (died 597), Roman Catholic saint and bishop of Amiternum
- Peregrine (martyr) (died 182 AD), Roman Catholic saint
- Peregrine of Auxerre (martyr) (died c. 304 AD), Roman Catholic saint
- Peregrine Laziosi, member of the Servite Order
- Peregrino I (514) and Peregrino II (649), Archbishops of Messina
- Peregrinus, Bishop of Terni (died 138 AD), Roman Catholic saint
- Piligrim or Peregrinus (died 990)

== Given name ==
=== Peregrine ===
- Perry Anderson (born 1938), British intellectual and essayist
- Peregrine Bertie (disambiguation), several people
- Peregrine Cavendish, 12th Duke of Devonshire (born 1944), British peer
- Peregrine Cust (disambiguation), several people
- Peregrine Hoby (1602–1679), English Member of Parliament
- Peregrine Honig (born 1976), American artist
- Peregrine Hopson (1696–1759), British army officer
- Peregrine Laziosi (1260–1345), Roman Catholic saint
- Sir Peregrine Maitland (1777–1854), British soldier and colonial administrator
- Peregrine Ó Duibhgeannáin (1600s), Irish historian
- Peregrine Osborne (disambiguation), several people
- Peregrine Pelham (died 1650), English Member of Parliament
- Sir Peregrine Simon (born 1950), British High Court judge
- Peregrine Tilghman (1741–1807), American politician and judge
- Peregrine White (1620–1704), first English child born in America after the arrival of the Mayflower
- Sir Peregrine Worsthorne (1923–2020), British journalist

=== Peregrinus ===
- Peregrinus Proteus (died 165 AD), a Cynic philosopher
- Petrus Peregrinus de Maricourt (1200s), French scholar

== Surname ==
- Howell Peregrine (1938–2007), British applied mathematician
- Tiberius Pollenius Armenius Peregrinus (3rd century AD), Roman consul
- Bartolfus Peregrinus (died by 1109) or Bartolf of Nangis
- Guilielmus Peregrinus (died 1146), a German pilgrim

== Fictional characters ==
=== Single names ===
- Peregrine, a character in Volpone a 1600s play by Ben Jonson
- Peregrine (comics), a Marvel Comics character

==== Given names ====
- Peregrine Fisher, lead character in the 2019 television series Ms Fisher's Modern Murder Mysteries and niece of Phryne Fisher
- Peregrine Hazard, a character in the 1991 novel Wise Children by Angela Carter
- Peregrine August, a character from Keath Ósk’s musical project Yaelokre
- James Peregrine Lester, a character played by Ben Miller in British television series Primeval
- Peregrine Pickle, the titular protagonist of a 1751 novel by Tobias Smollett
- Peregrin Took, a lead character and member of the Fellowship in the Lord of the Rings trilogy by J. R. R. Tolkien.

=== Surnames ===
- Miss Peregrine, a character in the 2011 novel Miss Peregrine's Home for Peculiar Children by Ransom Riggs and in the 2016 film adaptation
- Peregrine family, characters in the 1989 and 1991 novels by Jude Deveraux
- Sir Walter Peregrine, a character in the 1637 play The Example by James Shirley

== See also ==
- Pellegrino (given name)
- Pellegrino (surname)
- Perry (given name)
- Pippin Took, formally named Peregrin, a character in The Lord of the Rings by J. R. R. Tolkien
