= Melanie Horsnell =

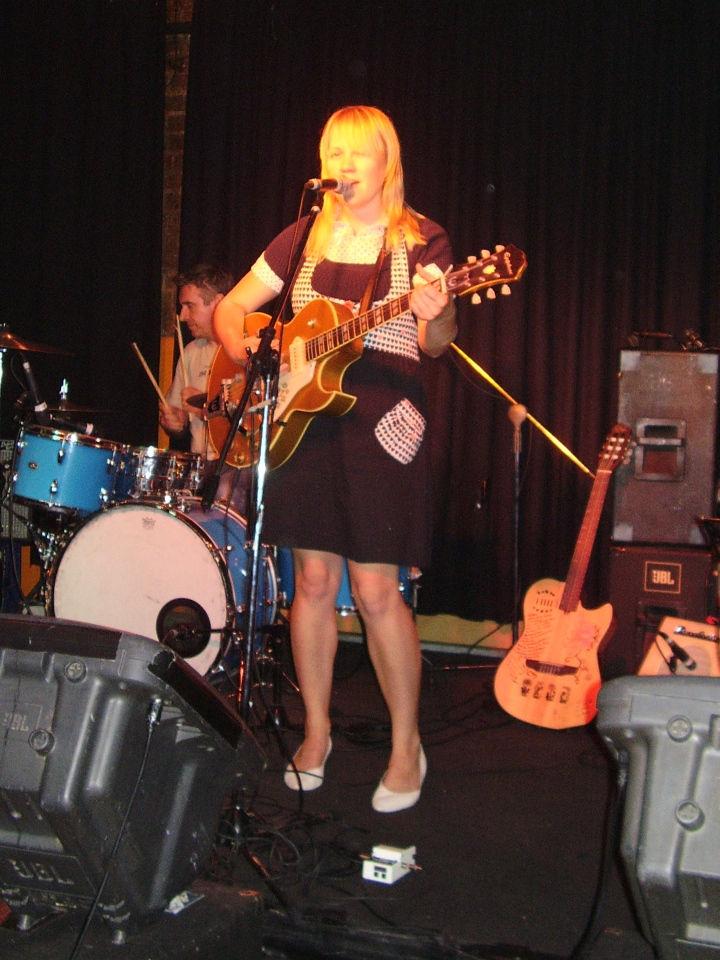
- Melanie Horsnell performing in 2007 at Hopetoun Hotel in Surry Hills, Sydney, Australia.

Background information
- Origin: Australia
- Genres: Pop, folk
- Occupation: Singer-songwriter
- Instruments: Guitar, vocals
- Years active: 2001–present
- Labels: Shock Records, Inflatable Girlfriend Records/MGM
- Website: melaniehorsnell.com.au

Melanie Horsnell is an Australian singer-songwriter.

The song "Sometimes" was featured in the Canadian TV program Flashpoint, being used in the Season 3 premiere episode titled "Unconditional Love". She has the distinction of being the only Australian to be featured in Flashpoint during its entire series run, the majority of artists featured on the program being from Canada or the USA.

== Musical career ==
Horsnell first picked up a guitar at the age of five, learning the classical and flamenco styles of play, and began busking at Manly Beach at the age of ten. By her late teens, she still had not really thought of continuing her music career – she had her heart set on managing a Woolworths supermarket – until she won a spot on The Northern Composure CD and national songwriting competitions. From there she headed to London for a year, busking on a daily basis and working on her songwriting skills.

Back home, Horsnell began her residency at the Excelsior Hotel in Glebe in 2000 and became regarded as one driving forces behind Sydney's blossoming "NuFolk" movement. Over the years at the Excelsior, she performed with some artists including Paul Greene, Andy Clockwise, Bertie Blackman, peregrine, Tim Ireland and Wesley Carr, while at the same time played host to many emerging artists, most notably Laura Imbruglia. Her residency continued for 4 years, but there were larger things afoot for the young songstress.

In 2001, Horsnell independently released her first EP, Don't Know What to Say, followed the next year her second EP Magic Mirror (produced by Garth Porter), which was soon picked up by radio across the country and led to her signing with Shock Publishing worldwide. Soon after, Horsnell was approached to write songs for popular children's show The Saddle Club and to score the soundtrack for the film Love in the First Degree.

In 2003, Horsnell began work on her debut album, The Adventures of..., again with Garth Porter behind the desk. Its first single "Birds" earned her high rotation on the Triple J network.

In 2004, she signed to Rounder records in Europe, after a demo of The Adventures of... found its way into the hands of Bert Pijpers of Rounder Records. The Adventures Of... was released in The Netherlands, Germany and the UK – in February 2005, the album was released in rest of Europe. Horsnell even did a crash course in French to record the French version of the beatlesque pop gem "I Just Want Some Love" which helped The Adventures Of… wind up as feature album on national radio in France that year. Having made no less than four tours of Europe over the years, she also played to a packed house at The Esplanade in Singapore in early 2005.

Her Australian fans were satisfied when they finally saw the release of her album The Adventures of... in September 2005 through Inflatable Girlfriend Records/MGM. Horsnell has also managed many Australian tours, often with her band "the Inflatable Girlfriends" (ironically made up of male musicians), as support for The Frames, Josh Pyke, Bernard Fanning (Powderfinger), Lou Rhodes (Lamb) and Jason Mraz.

She has supplied vocals for several songs used in television commercials, including McHappy Day, Johnnie Walker, Huggies, Women's Weekly, Bonds (company) and National Grid plc (in the United States). In addition, Horsnell and Elliot Wheeler came together in the side project "Forever Thursday", with Horsnell as the lead singer on the song "How Can It Be", music for a J.C. Penney advertisement shown during the 2007 Oscars.

In 2008 Horsnell went back into the studio with producer Paul Mckercher (Augie March, Magic Dirt, Little Birdy, Eskimo Joe) to lay down 12 new tracks for her album Complicated Sweetheart. The first single from the album features a track "Mary Mary" and two bonus songs, "Christmas in the suburbs" and The Saints song "Massacre", and was released in July 2008. "Mary Mary" received immediate airplay on National Youth Broadcaster Radio Triple J and also FBi Radio, RRR and a number of other stations.

The Cloud Appreciation Society, released in 2013, shares songs of small town love and loss, with an acoustic stripped-back sound, and is intermingled with Horsnell's starry-eyed voice, and a delicate but timeless presence.

In 2017, Horsnell went on a six-week European tour with Blue Mountains-based singer-songwriter Steve Appel (also known as King Curly); their collaborative album, The World Has A Gentle Soul, was released in 2018.

== Personal life ==
Horsnell, an Aboriginal woman, is the mother of two daughters. She currently lives in the tiny town of Candelo, New South Wales.

== Discography ==
=== Solo albums ===
- The Adventures Of – 2004 (UK), 2005 (AUS)
- Complicated Sweetheart – 2008
- The Cloud Appreciation Society – 2013
- dans la mer aussi il y a des étoiles – 2014
- Quatre Chemins – 2015
- Songs To Sing on a Saturday Night – 2016

=== Collaborative album ===
- The World Has A Gentle Soul (Melanie Horsnell & Steve Appel) – 2018

=== EPs ===
- Don't Know What To Say – 2001
- Magic Mirror – 2002
- Birds – 2004
- Kiss You Again – 2007
- Mary Mary – 2008

=== Music video ===
- How Can It Be (Forever Thursday) – 2007
