= Pellegrino =

Pellegrino may refer to:

== People ==
- Pellegrino (given name)
- Pellegrino (surname)

== Places ==
- Mount Pellegrino, an Italian mountain in Sicily
- Pellegrino Park, a municipal park in Marble Hill, Missouri
- Pellegrino Parmense, an Italian city of the province of Parma

== Other uses ==
- Joseph Pellegrino University Professor, a Harvard University professorship

== See also ==
- San Pellegrino (disambiguation)
- Peregrine (name)
