= Ascani =

Ascani is a surname. Notable people with the surname include:

- Francesco Ascani (born 1952), Italian racing driver
- Franco Ascani (born 1943), Italian businessman and sports manager
- Anna Ascani (born 1987), Italian politician
- Fred Ascani (1917–2010), American aviator and United States Air Force general
- Luca Ascani (born 1983), Italian cyclist
- Pellegrino Ascani, Italian Renaissance painter
