= Cynosure =

Cynosure (from Greek Κυνοσούρα kunosoura "dog's tail") may refer to:

- Polaris, in its role as pole star
- metaphorically:

- a guiding principle
- a focus of attention

- Cynosura (nymph), nymph in Greek mythology
- Cynosure (comics), fictional pan-dimensional city that exists within the First Comics multiverse
- Cynosure (album), an album by progressive/power metal band Viathyn
