= Viathyn =

Canadian metal band

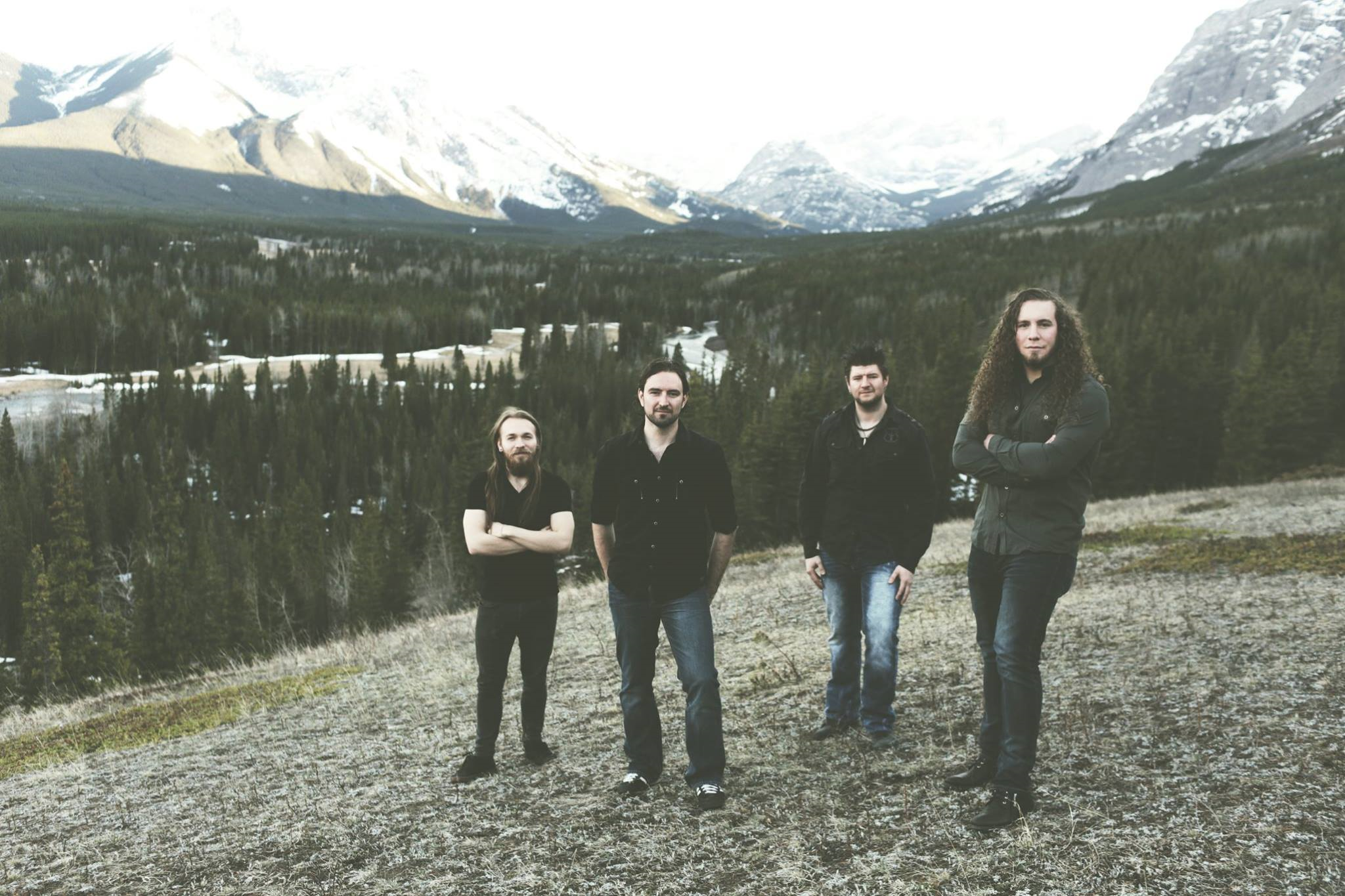
- Viathyn's lineup as of 2014. From the left: Alex Kot, Tomislav Crnkovic, Dave Crnkovic, Jacob Wright.

Background information
- Origin: Calgary, Alberta, Canada
- Genres: Power metal; Progressive metal
- Years active: 2006–present
- Label: Independent
- Members: Tomislav Crnkovic; Dave Crnkovic; Jacob Wright; Alex Kot
- Website: viathyn.com

Viathyn is a Canadian progressive/power metal band from Calgary, Alberta. Their music features a folkish 'natural' feel and themes such as the beauty of the natural world, existentialism, and storytelling. The vocals within Viathyn's music are also more subdued than typical power metal vocal heights, which lends to the natural and existential themes of their albums. The band's name is a play on the word 'leviathan', and has no true definition, but when describing the band can be defined as "progressive, melodic, grandiose, innovative and emotional".

In October 2014, they released their second full-length album, Cynosure with a streaming track Ageless Stranger.

== Biography ==
=== Formation, Demagogue (2006–2009) ===
Viathyn was formed in 2006 by brothers Tomislav Crnkovic and Dave Crnkovic when they started to work together with guitarist Jacob Wright. Tomislav and Dave had both played music throughout their lives, but decided due to their similar musical tastes to work together as a band in adulthood. According to an interview, Tomislav was working at Axe Music store in Calgary, and a young Jacob Wright came into the store one day and began to play.

This kid came in and started shredding on the guitar, and I told my boss at the time that we should hire this kid as a guitar teacher. We actually worked together for months before I realized this guy could probably actually be in the band.

Together the three musicians recorded many demo tracks, resulting in an instrumental EP Demagogue with session bass player Greg Musgrave. The EP was recorded and put together with equipment of Tomislav, who owned and had access to a large amount of such equipment due to his position at Axe Music.

Their instrumental EP release was meant to aid obtainment of an individual vocalist and a bassist. With the release, they managed to recruit Alex Kot as a bassist in 2009. Alex Kot had the ability to play the 8-string NS/Stick tapping fret-board instrument, which would lend a unique instrumental addition to the band.

=== The Peregrine Way (2010–2012) ===
The four band members began to work together on their first full-length album. It was recorded, mixed & engineered by Tomislav Crnkovic at Bard's Tavern Studio, and mastered by Sacha Laskow at Walk as Chaos Studio. The Peregrine Way was released to positive reviews in August 2010. The album follows along the journey of an unnamed wandering man, through the highs and lows of his life. A female guest vocalist Camille Austria was incorporated in multiple songs, including "Through the Orchard" and "Sirenum Scopuli". An entirely acoustic track "Canvas" is also present. Reviews indicated songs were well written for an independent band, and that all members performed quite well, in that there was no specific weakness from an instrumental perspective.

=== Cynosure (2014–present) ===
Viathyn released their second album Cynosure in October 2014, which features the addition of 7-string guitars. It was recorded between 2012 and 2014 at Perfect Fifth studios aided once again by engineering of Tomislav. Jacob Wright also aided in the recording and editing process. Similar to the previous album, it was mixed and mastered by friend Sacha Laskow. The name 'Cynosure' means 'focal point', 'guiding light', or 'source of inspiration'. Wright stated in a short album documentary:

We wanted to (use this name to) illustrate a group of people coming together, take that as more of a humbling sense of the word.

The album contains a heavier feel, portions with distorted screaming, and an increase in average tempo in contrast to the previous album. The recording features 9 tracks, each an average of 7 minutes long. The tracks include a song about the case of Edward Mordrake, a song "Albedo" describing the effects of consuming the fictitious universal remedy, Panacea, and "The Coachman", which contains a portion hearkening to the melody of In the Hall of the Mountain King, and tells a fictitious story about a coachman. Wright wrote the lyrics for 8 of the songs. Discussing the lyrics and themes of the album, Wright wrote:

Each track focuses upon a character that is either affected by or acts as an agent of chaos and the message we wanted to express is how small and insignificant our actions and petty squabbles are within the grand scale of the universe. It's kind of a backwards way of trying to show that we as humans should be humble and respectful to each other!

Compared to their first album, very positive media reception illustrated that the album was considerably tighter in terms of musicianship. Production had improved reasonably, the sound was less derivative, and vocals were more ambitious. Decibel Magazine indicated that Viathyn surprisingly sounded like a band in full stride on this release, not a new act.

In July 2016, Viathyn announced they would be going on indefinite hiatus. However, they promised that they planned on releasing a third album in the future, just not any time soon. They also stopped live performances while on hiatus. In 2020, they once again scheduled a performance at the Vancouver Hyperspace Metal Festival.

== Style and influences ==
Viathyn - Ageless Stranger
A clip from a track on Cynosure illustrates Viathyn's style of play.

Viathyn's music demonstrates a folkish, natural feel. Vocals are rather subdued in comparison to traditional power metal, sometimes comparable to the softer subdued vocals in shoegazing acts. Double-bass drum patterns iconic within power/speed metal acts are common, as are sweeping techniques in the lead guitar. In terms of Power and Folk metal acts, Viathyn has been compared to the sound of Falconer.

Viathyn members have indicated that their influences are varied, including bands such as Iron Maiden, Metallica, In Flames, Angra, Blind Guardian, Ensiferum, Rhapsody of Fire, Leprous, Dream Theater, Elvenking, Wuthering Heights, Cynic, and Atheist. Of the two Crnkovic brothers, the older Tomislav claims his favorite bands were older acts from the 80s, such as Iron Maiden, while the younger Dave is into the symphonic/power metal bands that arose in the 90s like Rhapsody of Fire and Luca Turilli. Tomislav was introduced to these bands via his younger brother, and they both grew to appreciate this sort of music.

Tomislav claimed that their biggest influences are power and folk bands, but their writing intentionally heavily favors a progressive sound. The goal of their progressive approach is to allow for an individual, interesting sound for both guitar parts and a more varied approach to sometimes simple power metal song structures. With regards to progressive song structures, Tomislav stated:

There's a feeling that they're (progressive metal bands) shooting out ideas, putting it together, and sort of just letting it happen very organically, and I think it separates itself from a very formula-style of music or genre...Some of the best moments of our music are near the end of a song.

With regards to the increasing amount of metal bands arising within Canada, as well as Viathyn's outlook on new Canadian acts, Tomislav also commented:

I think what happened maybe is the size sort of is creating that, Canada is so big that bands have to try harder to get noticed...no one's going to hear your music if you don't travel far enough.

== Band members ==
Current

- Tomislav Crnkovic – Guitars, Vocals (2006–present)
- Dave Crnkovic – Drums (2006–present)
- Jacob Wright – Guitars (2006–present)
- Alex Kot – Bass (2009–present)

Session and guests

- Greg Musgrave – Bass (2008)
- Camille Austria – Vocals (2010)
- Sean Jenkins – Growl Vocals (2014)

== Discography ==
Demos:

- Demo (2006)

EPs:

- Demagogue (2008)

Studio albums:

- The Peregrine Way (2010)
- Cynosure (2014)
