= The Peregrine Way =

Studio album by Viathyn
- Released: August 7, 2010
- Recorded: 2010 by Tomislav Crnkovic at Bard’s Tavern Studio
- Genre: Power metal, progressive metal
- Length: 1:04:14
- Label: Independent
- Producer: Tomislav Crnkovic & Viathyn

Viathyn chronology
| The Peregrine Way (2010) | Cynosure (2014) |

Professional ratings
Review scores
| Source | Rating |
|---|---|
| Sputnikmusic | 4/5 stars |
| Metal Temple | 4.5/5 stars |
| Metal Storm | 4/5 stars |

The Peregrine Way is the first full-length album by the power metal/progressive metal band Viathyn.

== Release ==
It was released physically and digitally in 2010.

== Track listing ==
All tracks are written by Viathyn, lyrics by Jacob Wright & Tomislav Crnkovic

| No. | Title | Length |
|---|---|---|
| 1. | "Antebellum" | 2:03 |
| 2. | "Heathen Arise" | 6:15 |
| 3. | "Sirenum Scopuli" | 6:26 |
| 4. | "Through the Orchard" | 8:42 |
| 5. | "The Oracle's Prophecy" | 8:04 |
| 6. | "Blackened Woods" | 5:58 |
| 7. | "The Twilight Haven" | 8:39 |
| 8. | "Frail Titan" | 6:26 |
| 9. | "Canvas" | 5:08 |
| 10. | "The Antique Man" | 6:33 |
| Total length: | | 1:04:14 |

== Personnel ==
- Tomislav Crnkovic – vocals, lead and rhythm guitars, acoustic guitars
- David Crnkovic – drums, keyboards
- Jacob Wright – lead and rhythm guitars, acoustic guitars
- Alex Kot – bass, acoustic guitars

=== Session musicians ===
- Sacha Laskow - guest guitar solo in “Sirenum Scopuli”
- Camille Austria - female vocals in “Sirenum Scopuli” & “Through the Orchard”

=== Technical staff ===
- Sacha Laskow - mastering
