= Peregrine Osborne =

Peregrine Osborne may refer to:

- Peregrine Osborne, 2nd Duke of Leeds (1659–1729), English MP for Berwick-upon-Tweed, Corfe Castle and York, Lord Lieutenant and Custos Rotulorum of the East Riding of Yorkshire
- Peregrine Osborne, 3rd Duke of Leeds (1691–1731), his son, English peer
