= Pellegrino (given name) =

Pellegrino is a masculine Italian given name. Notable people with the name include:

- Pellegrino I of Aquileia, patriarch from 1130 to 1161
- Pellegrino II of Aquileia, patriarch from 1195 to 1204
- Pellegrino Aretusi (ca. 1460-1523), Italian painter
- Pellegrino Artusi (1820–1911), Italian author of cuisine books
- Pellegrino Ascani (fl. 17th century), Italian painter
- Pellegrino da San Daniele (1467–1547), Italian painter
- Peregrine Laziosi or Pellegrino Laziozi (1260-1 May 1345), Italian saint
- Pellegrino Morano, Italian-American mafia boss
- Pellegrino Piola (1617–1640), Italian painter
- Pellegrino Rossi (1787–1848), Italian politician
- Pellegrino Tibaldi (1527–1596), Italian architect and artist
