= Guilielmus Peregrinus =

Blessed Guilielmus Peregrinus (d. April 20, c. 1146), also known as Wilhelm the Pilgrim, was a German pilgrim from Bogen, Bavaria. He is said to have healed Albert I, Count of Bogen but predicted his own imminent death. After death, his companion Raderus described his body as smelling sweet. He is a patron of recovery.
