= Peregrine (journal) =

- Language: English
- Edited by: Tim Kane

Publication details
- History: 2014 to 2015
- Publisher: Hoover Institution (United States)

Standard abbreviations
- ISO 4: Peregrine

Links
- Journal homepage

Peregrine: American Immigration in the 21st Century is an online journal published by the Hoover Institution as part of its Conte Initiative on Immigration Reform. It is focused on understanding immigration to the United States and identifying optimal immigration policy for the contemporary United States. The journal is edited by economist Tim Kane and relies on contributions from Hoover's Working Group on Immigration Reform, co-chaired by Kane and Edward Lazear.

== History ==
The first issue of Peregrine, issue 1401, was published in late June 2014.

== Reception ==
The news release by the Hoover Institution about the launch was published on CNBC, and Herald Online
