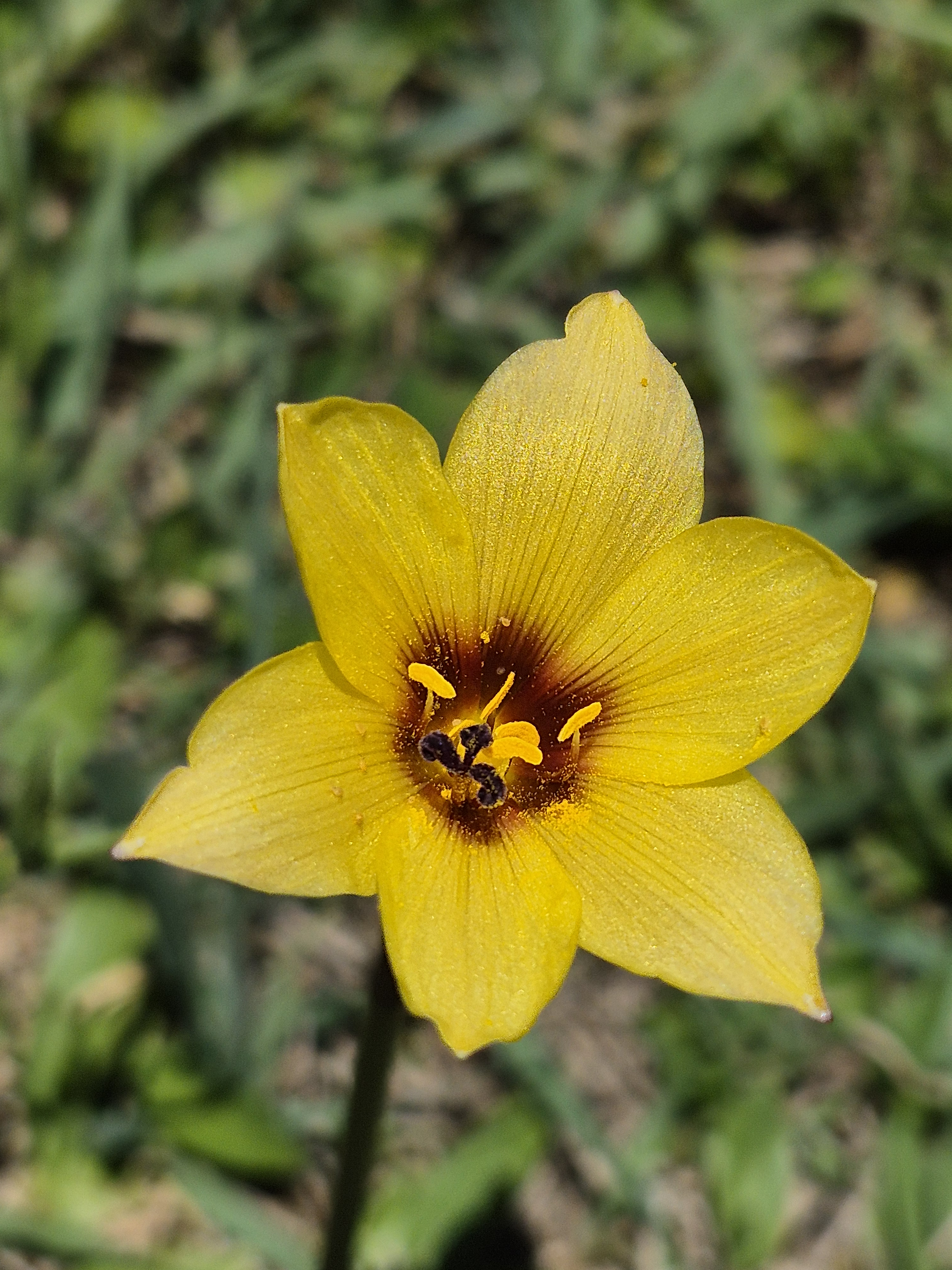
- flower in Rio Grande do Sul, Brazil
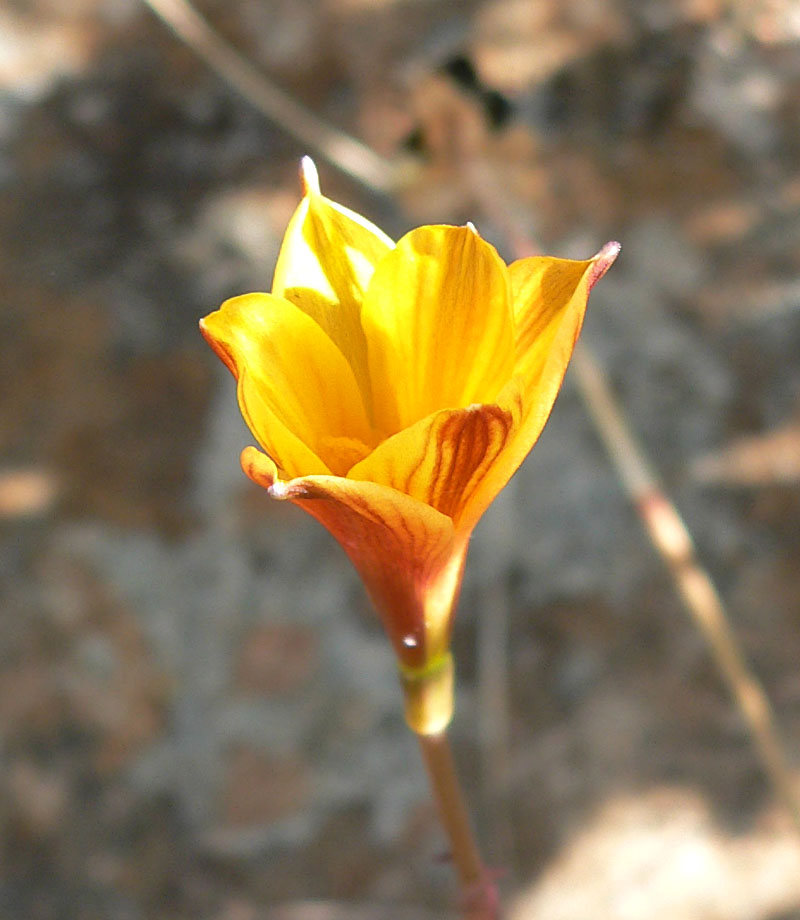

Scientific classification
- Kingdom: Plantae
- Clade: Tracheophytes
- Clade: Angiosperms
- Clade: Monocots
- Order: Asparagales
- Family: Amaryllidaceae
- Subfamily: Amaryllidoideae
- Genus: Zephyranthes
- Species: Z. tubispatha

Binomial name
- Zephyranthes tubispatha (L'Hér.) Herb.

Synonyms
- Amaryllis depauperata Poepp.; Amaryllis tubispatha L'Hér.; Arviela tubispatha (L'Hér.) Salisb.; Atamosco tubispatha (L'Hér.) M.Gómez; Habranthus andersonii var. texanus (Herb.) Herb.; Habranthus parvulus (Herb.) Pritz.; Habranthus texanus (Herb.) Herb. ex Steud.; Habranthus tubispathus (L'Hér.) Traub; Habranthus tubispathus f. bicolor (Ravenna) Traub; Habranthus tubispathus var. bicolor Ravenna; Habranthus tubispathus subsp. macranthus Ravenna; Habranthus tubispathus var. roseus Ravenna; Habranthus tubispathus f. roseus (Ravenna) Traub; Habranthus tubispathus subsp. variabilis Ravenna; Habranthus variabilis (Ravenna) Ravenna; Hippeastrum andersonii (Herb.) Baker; Hippeastrum texanum (Herb.) Baker; Hippeastrum tubispathum (L'Hér.) Baker; Zephyranthes andersonii (Herb.) Benth. & Hook.f.; Zephyranthes andersonii var. rosea E.Holmb.; Zephyranthes commersoniana Herb.; Zephyranthes texana Herb.

= Zephyranthes tubispatha =

Species of flowering plant

Zephyranthes tubispatha, synonym Habranthus tubispathus, the Rio Grande copperlily or Barbados snowdrop, is a species of flowering plant in the family Amaryllidaceae. It is a perennial bulb native to southern South America (Brazil, Argentina, Paraguay and Uruguay). It is widely cultivated as an ornamental and reportedly naturalized in the southeastern United States (Texas, Louisiana, Mississippi, Alabama, Georgia, Florida), much of the West Indies as well as Bermuda, eastern Mexico, India, Easter Island, and central Chile.

== Description ==
Flowers are produced sporadically during late summer and autumn, singly on stems 10 to 20 centimetres (4 to 8 in) tall. Flowers are usually yellow with copper tones on the outside, with tepals about 3 centimetres (1.2 in) long, fused for a short distance at the base to form a tube. As with all former Habranthus species, the flowers are not upright on the stem but held at a slight angle. The leaves are not normally present at flowering time, appearing later; they are narrowly linear.

== Chemical composition ==
Contains toxic lycorine.

== Cultivation ==
Zephyranthes tubispatha tolerates some frost down to 0 °C (32 °F) if planted in a sheltered sunny position, but will not survive being frozen. It seeds freely. A form with pinkish flowers is grown as var. rosea, but may be a hybrid.

Z. tubispatha has gained the Royal Horticultural Society's Award of Garden Merit. The name Habranthus andersonii is commonly found in horticultural sources.

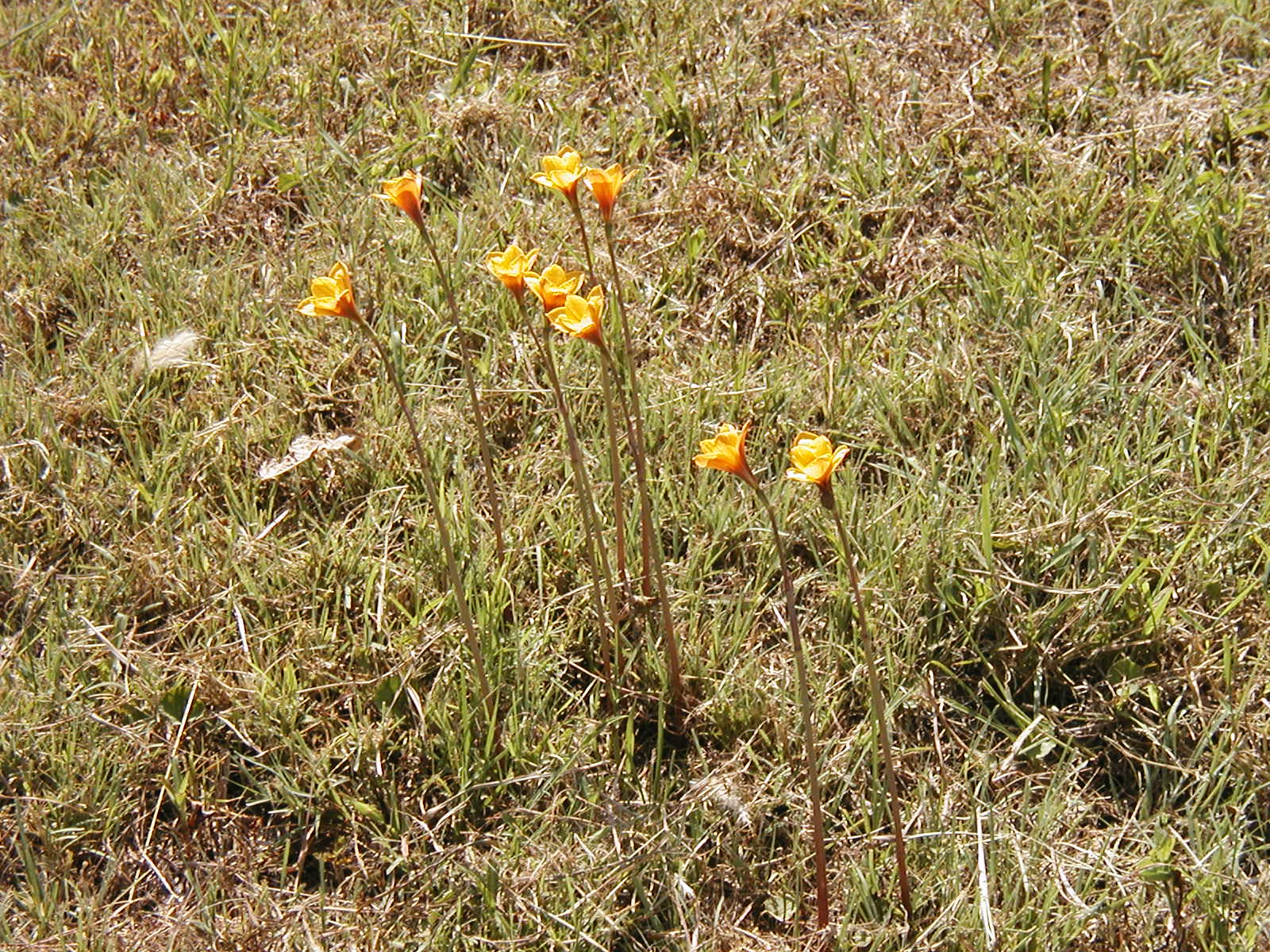
Growing in Denton, Texas, USA

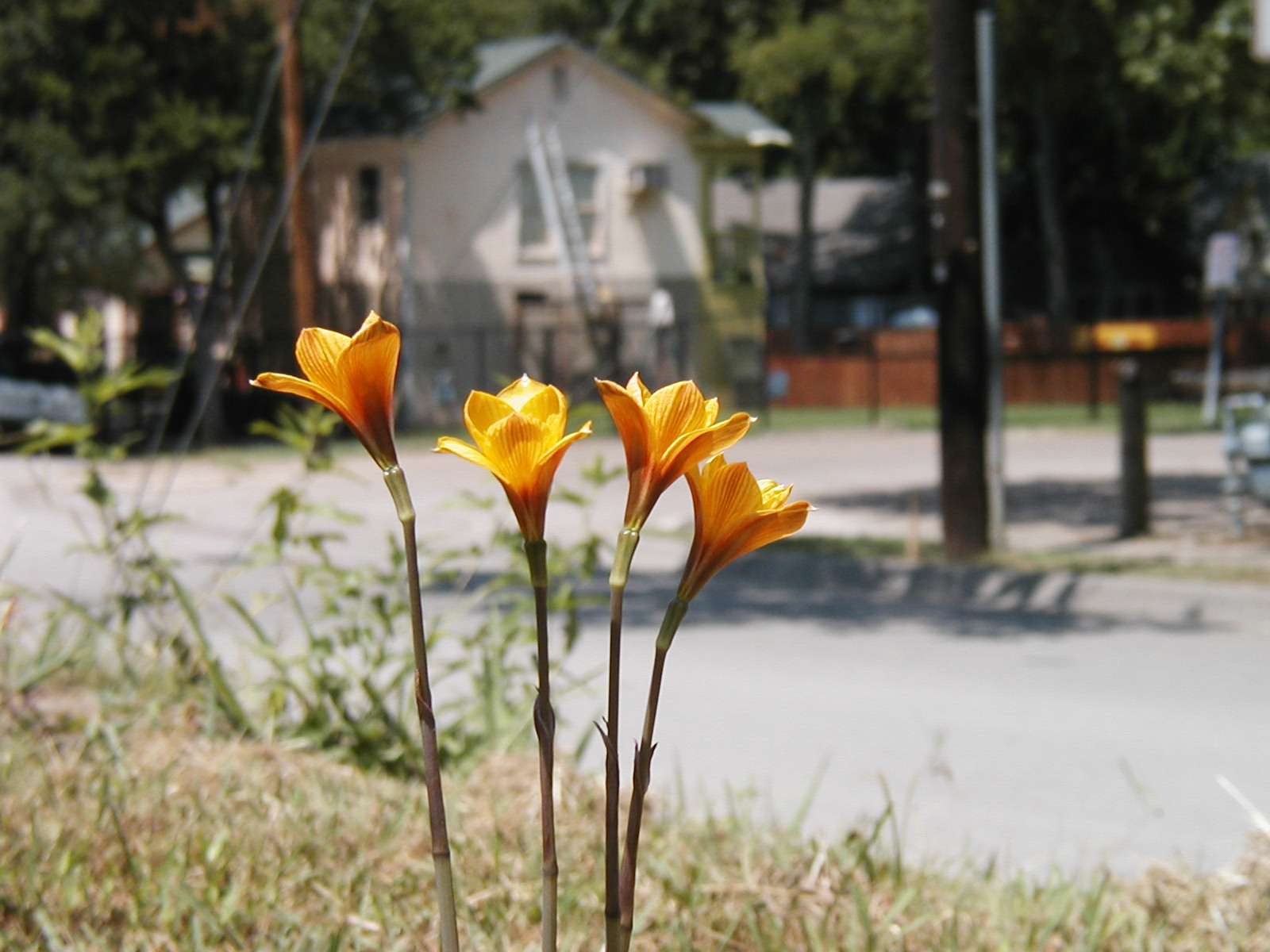
Growing in Denton, Texas, USA

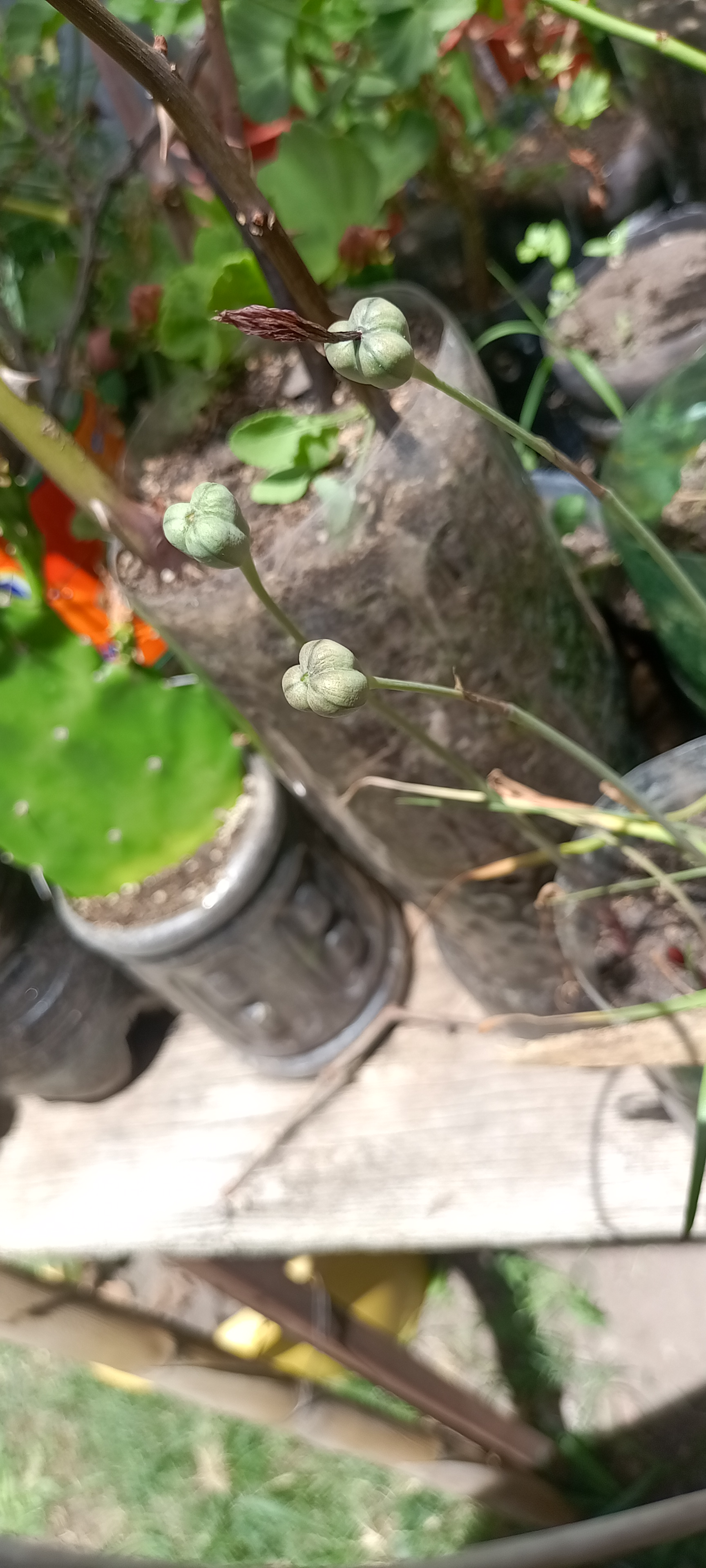
Seed capsules

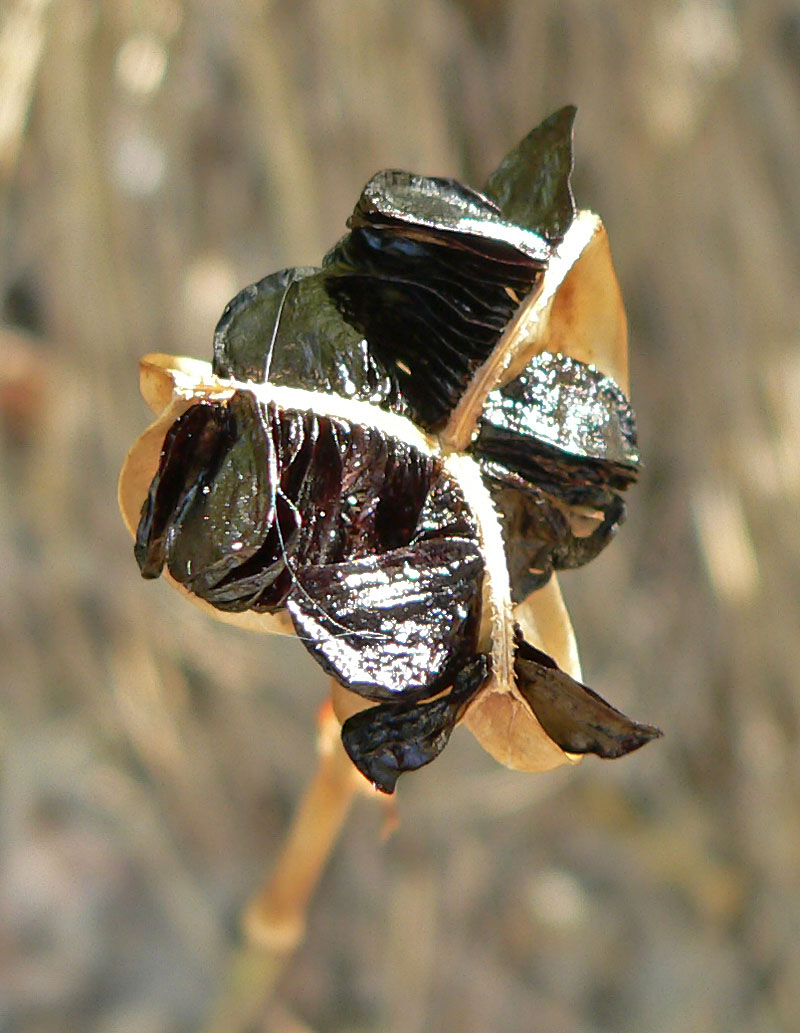
Seeds

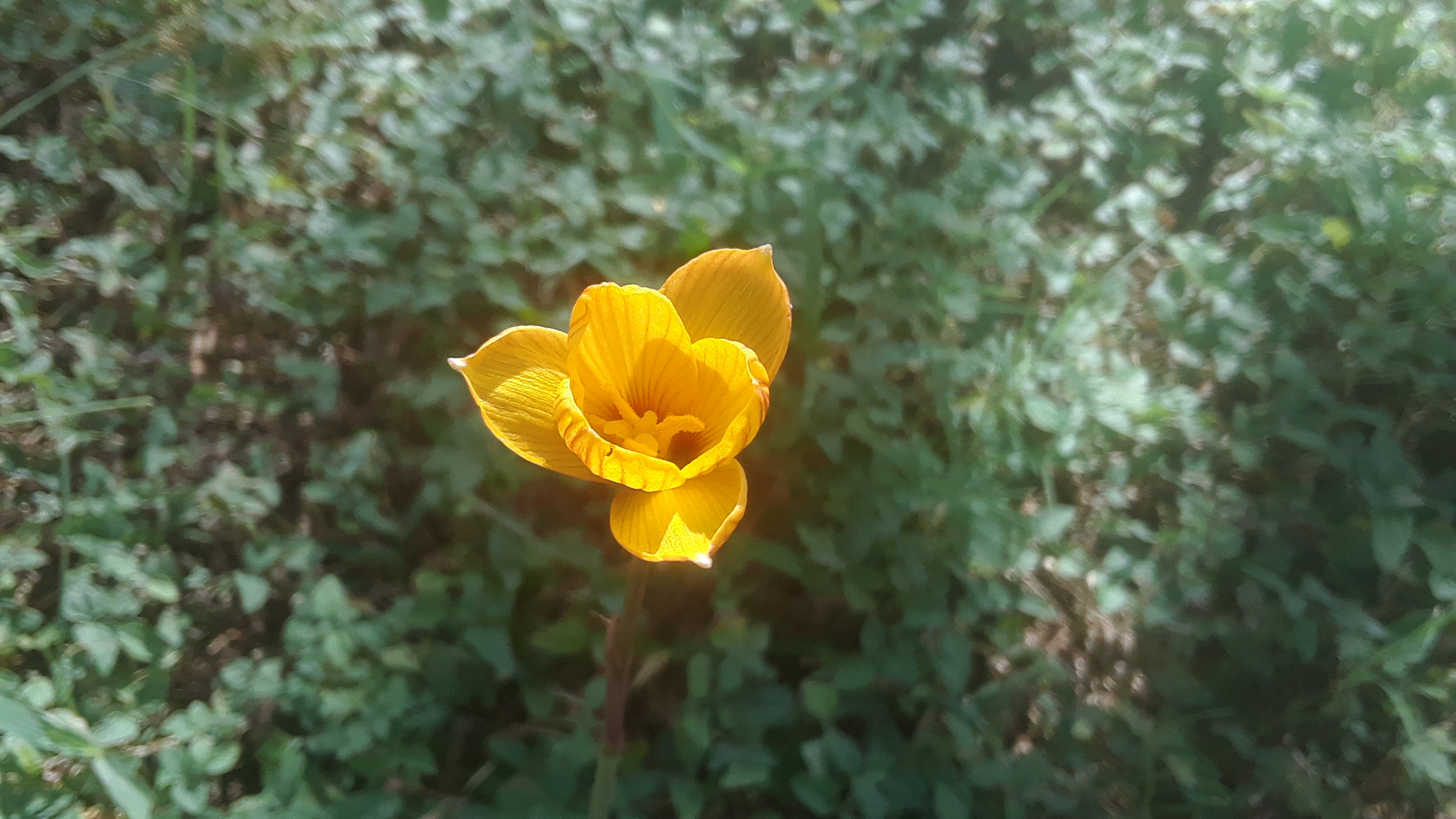
Growing at TWU in Denton, Tx.
