= Cynosure (album) =

Studio album by Viathyn
- Released: October 7th, 2014
- Recorded: August 2012 – February 2014 at Perfect Fifth Studio and Bard’s Tavern Studio
- Genre: Power metal, progressive metal
- Length: 1:04:17
- Label: Independent
- Producer: Tomislav Crnkovic

Viathyn chronology
The Peregrine Way (2010)	Cynosure (2014)

Professional ratings
Review scores
Source	Rating
Dangerdog	4.75 stars on a 5 point scale
Metal Temple	4.5/5 stars
Metal Storm	4.25 stars on a 5 point scale

Cynosure is the second album by the power metal/progressive metal band by Viathyn. It was released physically and digitally in 2014.

== Track listing ==
All tracks are written by Viathyn

No.	Title	Length
1.	"Ageless Stranger"	7:13
2.	"The Coachman"	5:41
3.	"Edward Mordrake"	6:24
4.	"Shadows in Our Wake"	7:02
5.	"Countess of Discordia"	7:12
6.	"Time Will Take Us All"	7:01
7.	"Three Sheets to the Wind"	7:21
8.	"Albedo"	6:48
9.	"Cynosure"	9:35
Total length:		1:04:17

== Personnel ==
- Tomislav Crnkovic – vocals, guitars
- David Crnkovic – drums
- Jacob Wright – guitars
- Alex Kot – bass

=== Session musicians ===
- Sean Jenkins - guest harsh vocals

=== Technical staff ===
- Sacha Laskow - mastering
