= Pellegrino Ascani =

Italian painter

Pellegrino Ascani was an Italian painter of the 17th century. Born in Carpi and active in Lombardy as a still life painter of fruits and flowers. His brother Simone was also a painter.
