= Peregrine (band) =

- Origin: Surry Hills, New South Wales, Australia
- Genre: Indie rock
- Years active: 1999–present
- Label: Independent
- Members: Brett Winterford; Mat Smith; Felix Akurangi; Mark Holbert
- Website: http://www.peregrine-music.com

Peregrine are an Australian indie rock band formed in Sydney in 1999.

== Early career ==
Peregrine began as the vehicle for the performance of songs written by Brett Winterford, who after several early line-up changes settled on drummer Mathew Smith and bassist Dane Higgins (both joining in 1999), and guitarist Felix Akurangi (joining in 2000). Mark Holbert replaced Higgins on bass and Dave Stabback joined later in the band's career.

Winning a local band competition in Sydney's beachside suburb of Manly within their first few gigs, the band established a residency at the Excelsior of Glebe. This residency ran for two years. At the time, the band was described in street-press magazine Revolver as "Sydney's best kept secret".

In 2003, the band booked itself into Big Jesus Burger Studios in Sydney's Surry Hills to record its first album, which was released under the title One Big Happy Heart Attack.

== One Big Happy Heart Attack ==
Recorded by producer Chris Townend (Augie March, Darren Hanlon), Heart Attack was a selection of the tracks regularly performed at the Glebe residency.

Songs were tracked live onto two-inch tape, and featured many of the guests that had shared the Excelsior stage with the band - including fellow songwriters Paul Greene, Melanie Horsnell and Josh Schuberth back Winterford's vocals.

A representative from Shock Music Publishing happened to enter the studio while the band was laying down one of its newer tracks, "Fingerpointing".

Winterford's publishing and the album's distribution would later be signed with Shock.

The album was reviewed very favourably by Australia's national newspapers - with The Australian giving it four stars and praising its "narrative wit" and "quiet charm".

The album's opening track "Fingerpointing" was picked up by Australia's national youth radio broadcaster Triple J among others, and was featured in the radio station's 'Home and Hosed: First Harvest' compilation, and on several films and television shows.

== Stay Inside & Misbehave ==
After touring Heart Attack up and down Australia's East Coast, the band took a break in 2004/05 to allow Winterford to travel. Upon his return, the band reformed with new bassist Mark Holbert, and began tracking their 2007 album Stay Inside & Misbehave at Sydney's 301 Studios.

The album was produced by Daniel Denholm (The Cruel Sea, Midnight Oil, Powderfinger, Alex Lloyd).

== Members ==
- Brett Winterford (vocals, piano, guitar)
- Felix Akurangi (guitar, percussion)
- Mathew Smith (drums)
- Mark Holbert (bass, backing vocals)

== Discography ==
=== Albums ===
Title	Year
One Big Happy Heart Attack	2004
Stay Inside & Misbehave	2007

=== Singles ===
Title	Year
Fingerpointing	2004
The Good Ship	2007

== Reviews ==
"Narrative wit and poetic soul-searching in abundance. Quietly charming." - Iain Sheddon, The Weekend Australian

"Brett Winterford sings with a wistfulness that makes him eminently likeable.” - Katrina Lobley, Sydney Morning Herald

"A good songwriter is also a good storyteller. The lyrics, the melody, the rhythm - a multi-dimensional world guided by the writer but created by the listener. This is one such gift of good music; its ability to transport you to far off places that are inaccessible from your current situation. Peregrine have that. Swashbuckling, rollicking melodies through the seas of the unknown." - Hutch, Sandwich Club blog, March 2007

"Heart Attack hums with life, both sprightly and seductive." - Mike Gee, The Brag

“Proficient, infectious, acoustic popsters with intelligence.” - Soph Gyles, The OzMusic Project

Craig New Revolver Magazine says, “Are they one of the big secrets about town or what? Amazing vocals, beautiful pop melodies, stunning."
