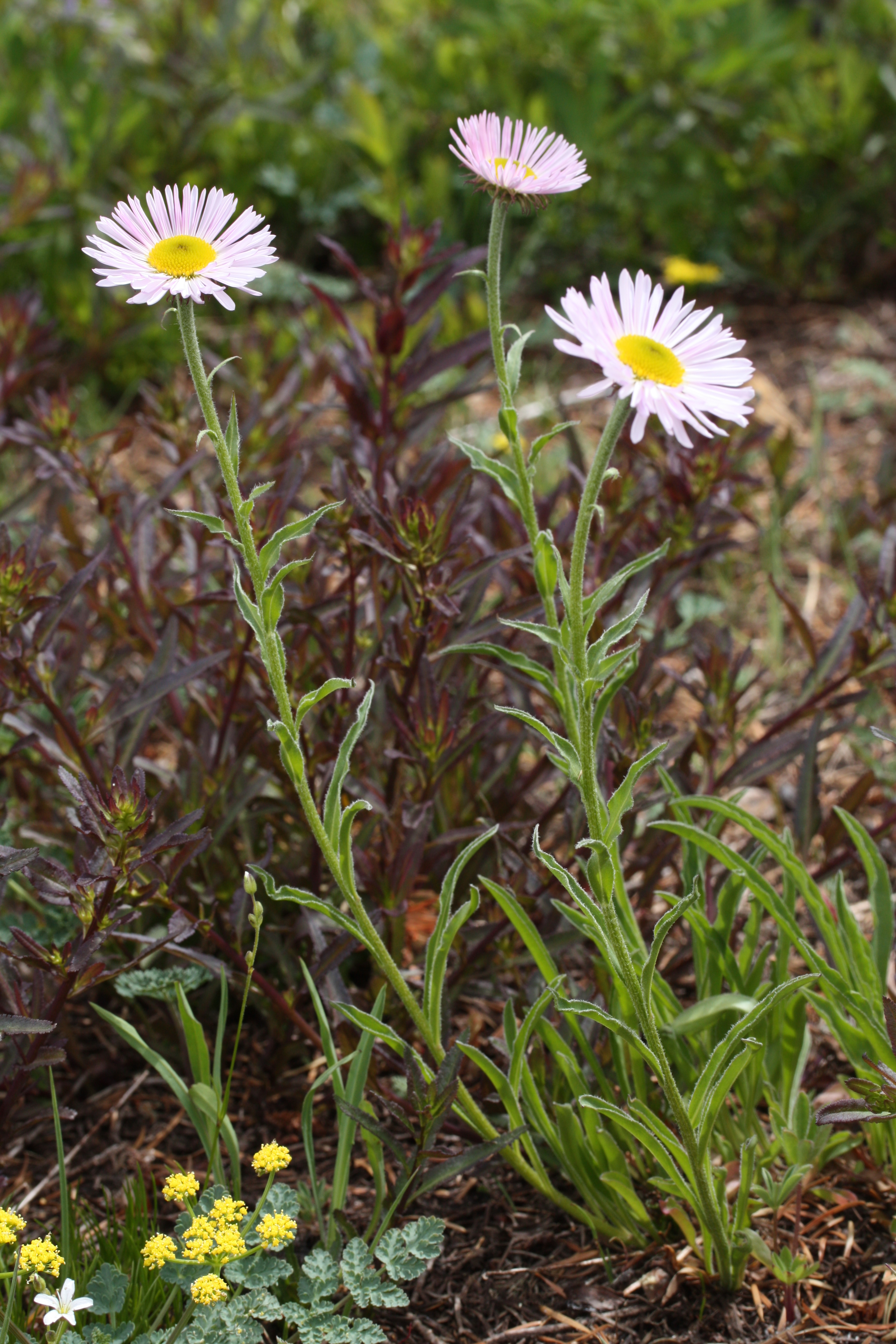
- Erigeron peregrinus subsp. callianthemus Olympic National Park

Scientific classification
- Kingdom: Plantae
- Clade: Tracheophytes
- Clade: Angiosperms
- Clade: Eudicots
- Clade: Asterids
- Order: Asterales
- Family: Asteraceae
- Genus: Erigeron
- Species: E. peregrinus

Binomial name
- Erigeron peregrinus (Banks ex Pursh) Greene

Synonyms
- Synonymy: Aster peregrinus Banks ex Pursh; Aster salsuginosus Hook.; Aster tilesii Wichstr.; Aster unalaschkensis Less; Erigeron hesperocallis Greene; Erigeron membranaceus Greene; Erigeron regalis Greene; Erigeron unalaschkensis Less.

= Erigeron peregrinus =

Species of flowering plant

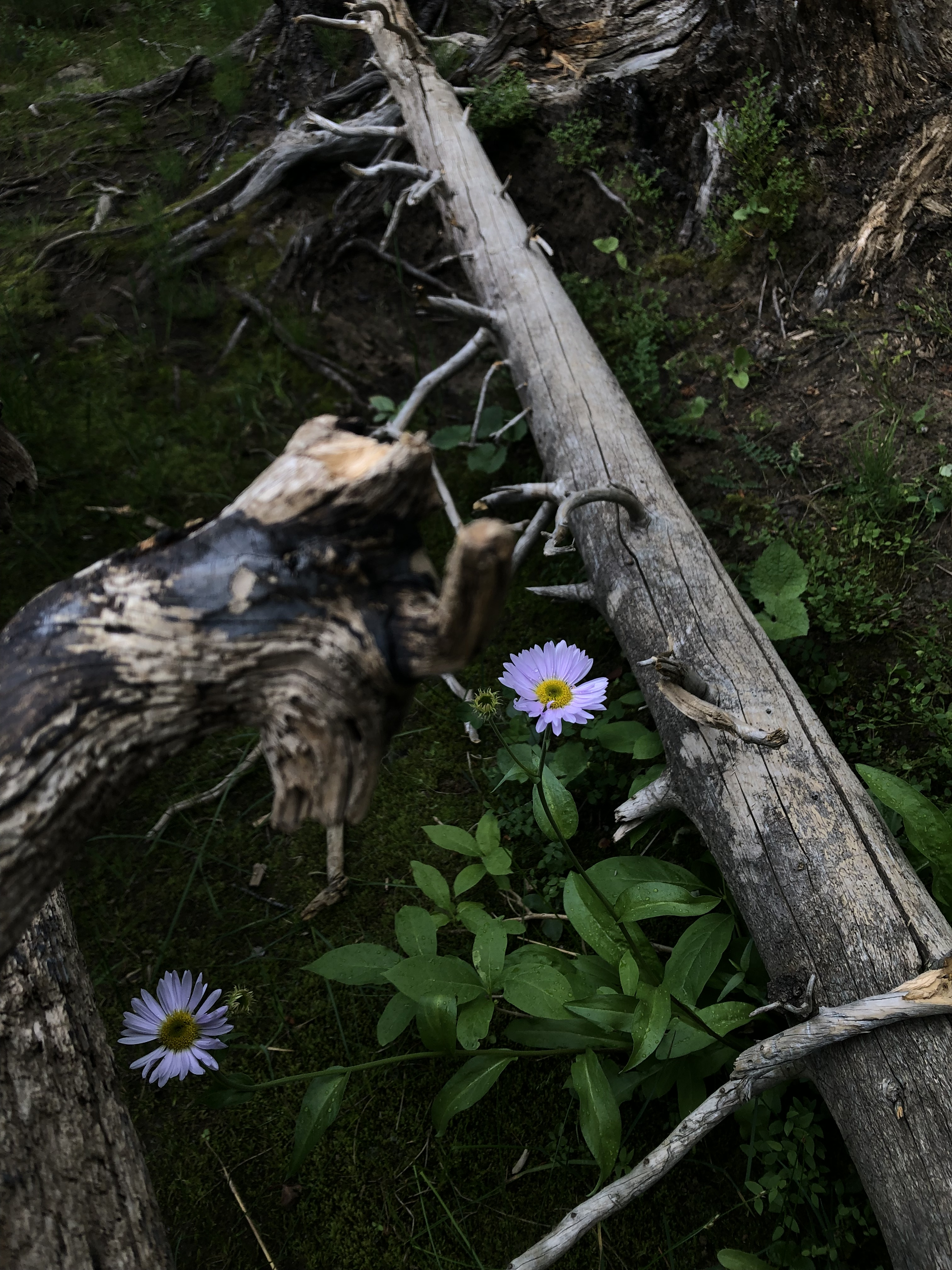
Erigeron peregrinus, taken in either Montana or Wyoming.

Erigeron peregrinus is a North American species of flowering plants in the family Asteraceae known by the common name wandering fleabane.

Erigeron peregrinus is native to northwestern North America from Alaska to Oregon. Some populations from further south (California, Colorado, etc.) were formerly considered as belonging to this species, but they have now either been moved to other taxa or recognized as distinct species.

Erigeron peregrinus is a perennial herb up to 70 centimeters (28 inches) in height, spreading by means of underground rhizomes. It has hairless to hairy leaves reaching up to 10 centimeters long at the base of the branching stem, getting smaller higher up on the stem. The plant usually produces only one flower head per stem, each with 30–80 blue, purple, pink, or white ray florets surrounding numerous disc florets. Flowers bloom July to August. Its habitats include stream banks, bogs, and moist mountain meadows.

Varieties

- Erigeron peregrinus var. peregrinus - Alaska, Yukon, British Columbia, Alberta
- Erigeron peregrinus var. thompsonii (S.F.Blake ex J.W. Thompson) Cronquist - Washington
