= Tilles =

Tilles is a surname. Notable people with the surname include:

- Andrew Tilles (1865–1951), American business magnate and philanthropist
- George Tilles (disambiguation):
  - George Tilles Sr. (1859–1929), American businessman
  - George Tilles Jr. (1894–1958), American businessman

== See also ==
- Tilles Foundation
