= George Tilles =

George Tilles may refer to:

- George Tilles Sr. (1859–1929), American businessman and early developer of Fort Smith, Arkansas
- George Tilles Jr. (1894–1958), president of the International Hat Company
