= North Hampton, St. Louis =

Neighborhood of St. Louis in Missouri, US

Coordinates: 38.5986°N 90.2808°W

North Hampton
- Neighborhood of St. Louis
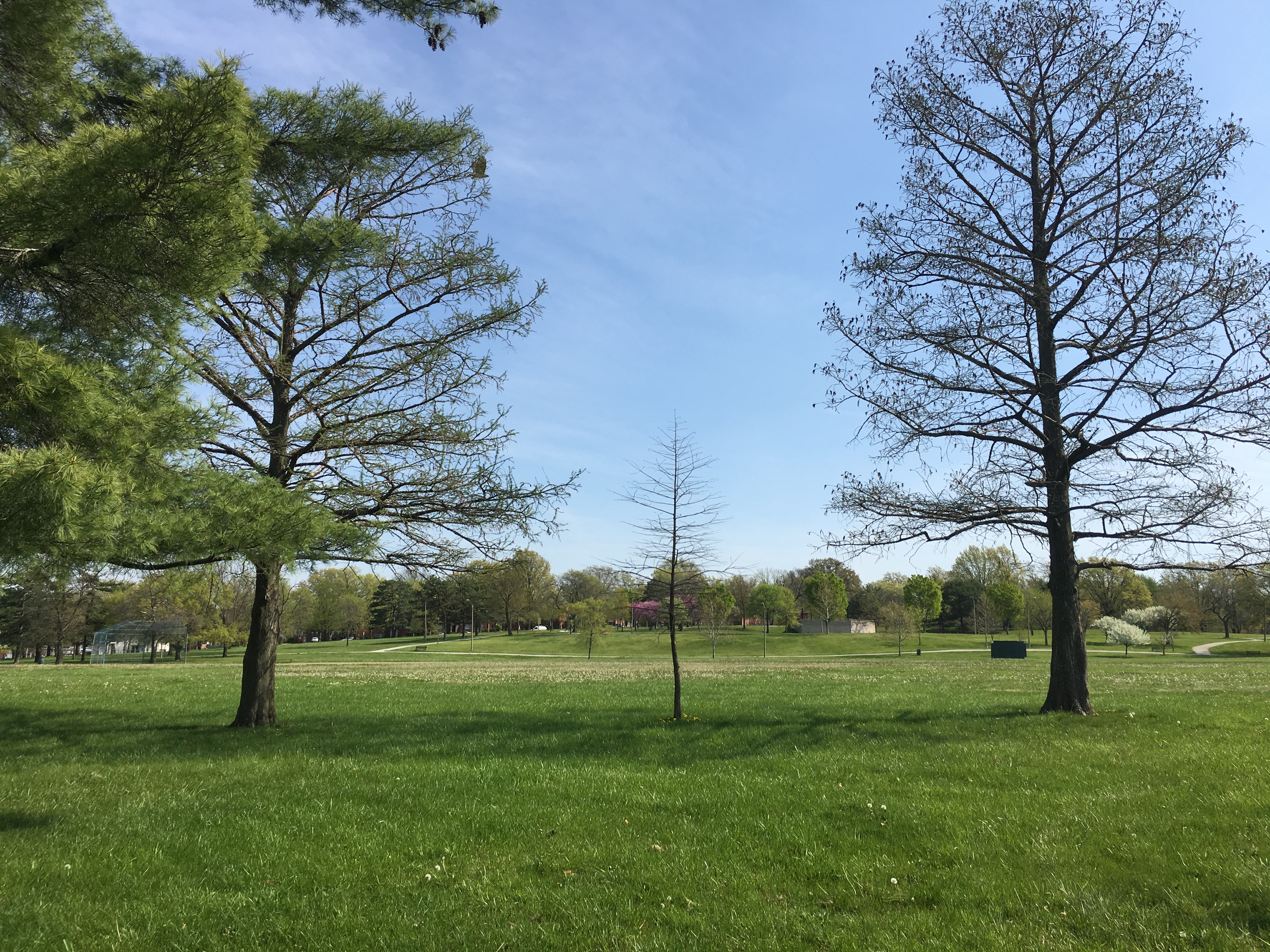
- Tilles Park in the North Hampton neighborhood of St. Louis in May 2018

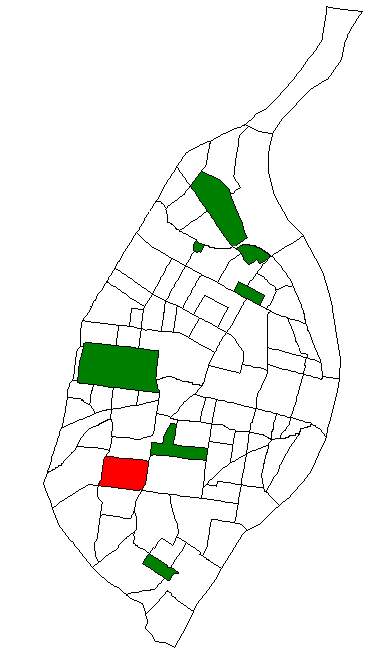
- Location (red) of North Hampton within St. Louis
- Country: United States
- State: Missouri
- City: St. Louis
- Wards: 5

Government
  - Aldermen: Matt Devoti

Area
  - Total: 0.92 sq mi (2.4 km^{2})

Population (2020)
  - Total: 7,489
  - Density: 8,100/sq mi (3,100/km^{2})
- ZIP code(s): Parts of 63109, 63139
- Area code(s): 314
- Website: stlouis-mo.gov

North Hampton is a neighborhood of St. Louis, Missouri. Located in St. Louis, North Hampton is bounded by Scanlan and Connecticut to the north, South Kingshighway Boulevard to the east, Chippewa Street to the south, and Hampton Avenue to the west.

Two smaller neighborhoods make up North Hampton. The Tilles Park neighborhood occupies the area from Hampton Avenue to Macklind Avenue, and the Kingshighway Hills neighborhood occupies the area from Macklind Avenue to South Kingshighway Boulevard.

== Tilles Park ==
The 29-acre (120,000 m^{2}) Tilles Park was created by city ordinance 48569 in 1956. It was named after Andrew Tilles, a wealthy business man of the early 20th century. There is also a Tilles Park in St. Louis County.

== Demographics ==
Historical population
Census	Pop.	Note	%±
1990	7,708		—
2000	8,097		5.0%
2010	7,892		−2.5%
2020	7,489		−5.1%

In 2020, Northampton's racial makeup was 71.4% White, 15.9% Black, 0.3% Native American, 4.2% Asian, 6.8% Two Or More Races, and 1.5% Some Other Race. 4.6% of the population was of Hispanic or Latino origin.
