= St. Louis Exposition =

St. Louis Exposition may refer to:

- Saint Louis Exposition, a series of annual fairs from the 1850s to 1902
- Louisiana Purchase Exposition, the 1904 St. Louis World's Fair
