= Fairground Park (St. Louis) =

Municipal park in St. Louis, Missouri, U.S.

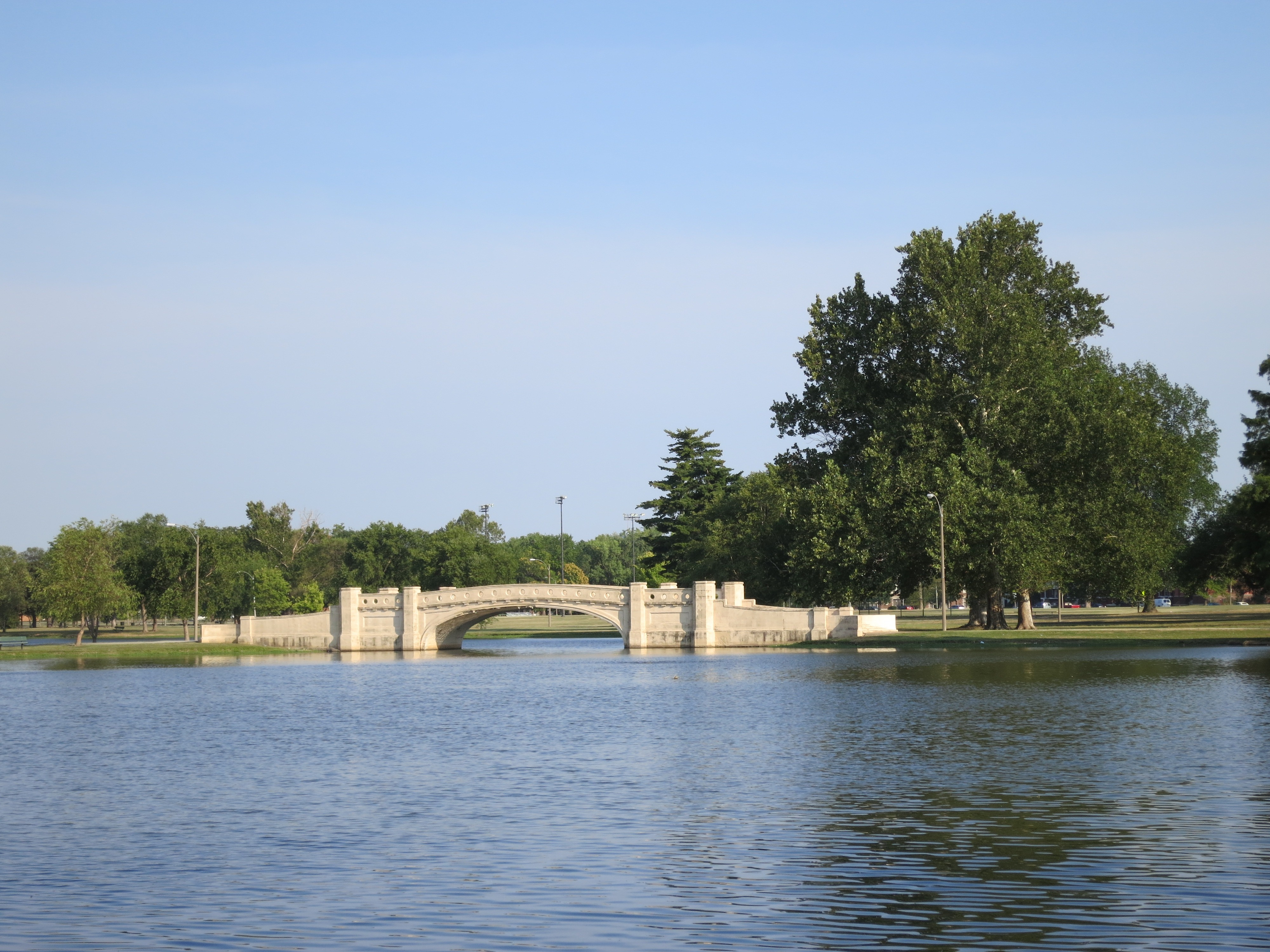
- Fairground Park lake bridge
- Interactive map of Fairground Park
- Type: Urban park
- Location: St. Louis, Missouri, United States
- Coordinates: 38.6656°N 90.2217°W
- Area: 131 acres (53 ha)
- Created: 1908 (as fairgrounds 1856)
- Operator: St. Louis Department of Parks, Recreation, and Forestry
- Status: Open
- Public transit: MetroBus
- Website: stlouis-mo.gov

Fairground Park is a municipal park that opened in 1908 in St. Louis, Missouri. It was originally a privately owned facility, first used by the St. Louis Agricultural and Mechanical Association for the St. Louis Exposition from 1856 through 1902. However, the Civil War interrupted the annual fair when the Fairgrounds were used as a Union encampment known as Benton Barracks. The annual exposition ceased in 1902 as preparations for the 1904 World's Fair began.

== History ==
=== Fair Grounds Race Track ===
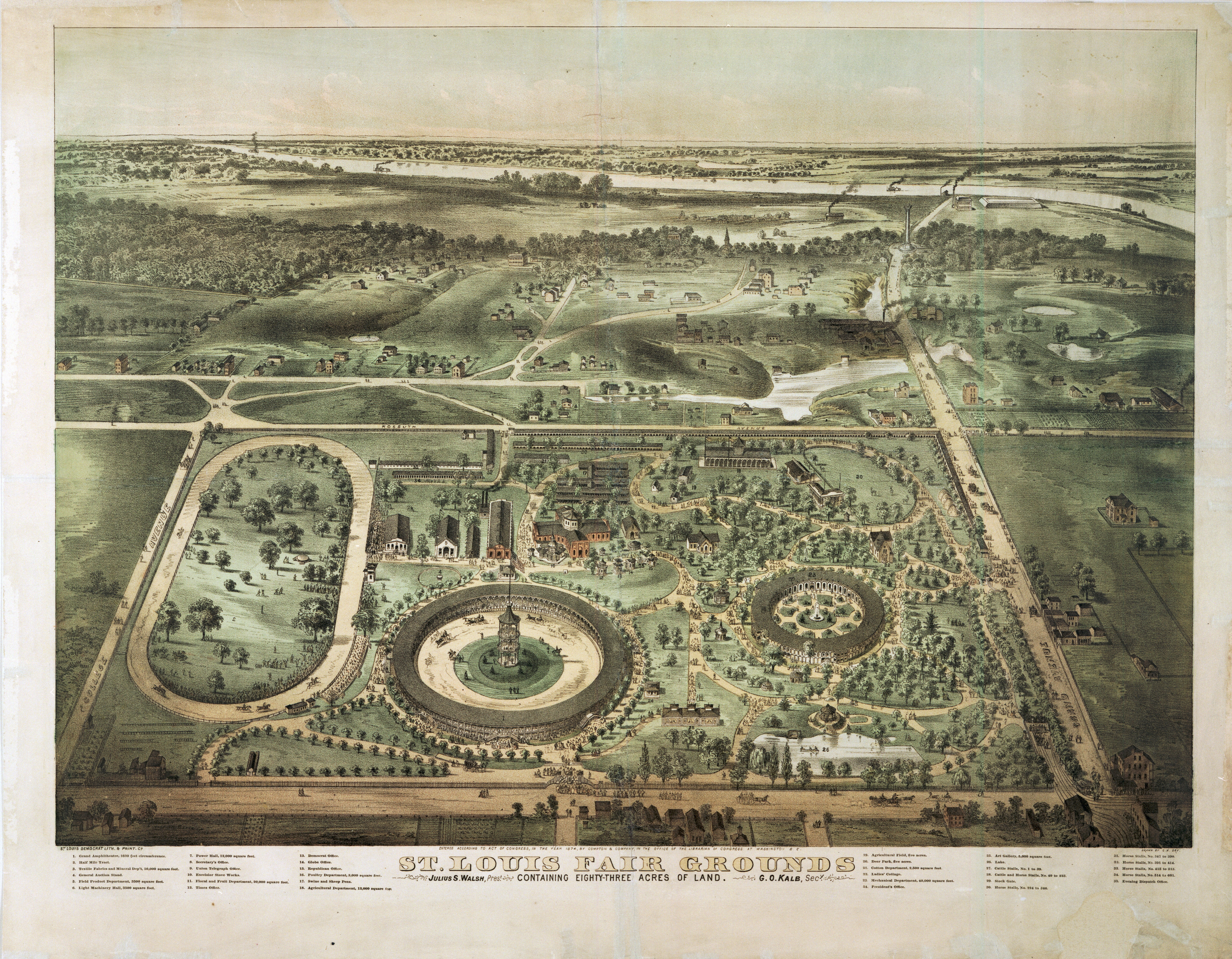
St. Louis Fair Grounds and race track in an 1874 panoramic map with list of landmarks

The Fairgrounds originated in 1856 with the St. Louis Agricultural and Mechanical Association. In the early 1880s, the association fell upon hard times and was replaced with the St. Louis Fair and Jockey Club.

In 1901, Cap Tilles, Sam W. Adler, and Louis A. Cella, the principal owners of Delmar Racing Track, purchased the St. Louis Fairgrounds. Since 1892, the partnership had been purchasing race tracks across the St. Louis area, with Delmar Track becoming the main competitor to the St. Louis Fair and Jockey Club. By the turn of the century, the competition won out, with Tilles becoming President of the new association.

However, the revival of the Fairgrounds suffered another blow with the abolition of gambling on horse racing in Missouri in June 1905. Governor Joseph W. Folk was elected in 1904, running as an anti-gambling, progressive reformer. Folk signed the Anti-Breeders Act, directly leading to the permanent closure of the St. Louis Fairground Track.

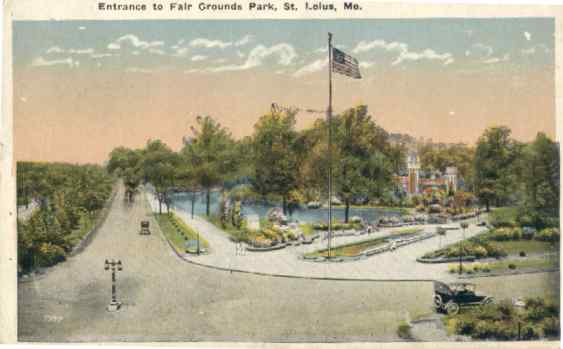
St Louis Fairground Park Entrance, 1913

In 1908, after protracted political debate, the abandoned 132-acre (0.53 km^{2}) fairground was purchased from the association for park use by St. Louis for $700,000. The park was dedicated on October 9, 1909.

All of the former fair structures and zoo buildings were removed except the bear pits of the old zoo and the amphitheater. In 1912, the amphitheater was removed and replaced by the city's first municipal swimming pool, then said to be the world's largest. It was at this pool that Fairground Park riot occurred, which was violence against Black pool-goers that occurred in 1949 when the Whites-only pool was forced to allow African-Americans. The pool was later closed rather than continue operating as an integrated facility. The original pool was replaced by a new pool in 1958 as part of the 1955 bond issue program, which also provided lighted ball diamonds and hardsurface tennis courts.

At the corner of Grand Boulevard and Natural Bridge Avenue, the facade of the old bear pits still stands at the park's main entrance.

== Geography ==
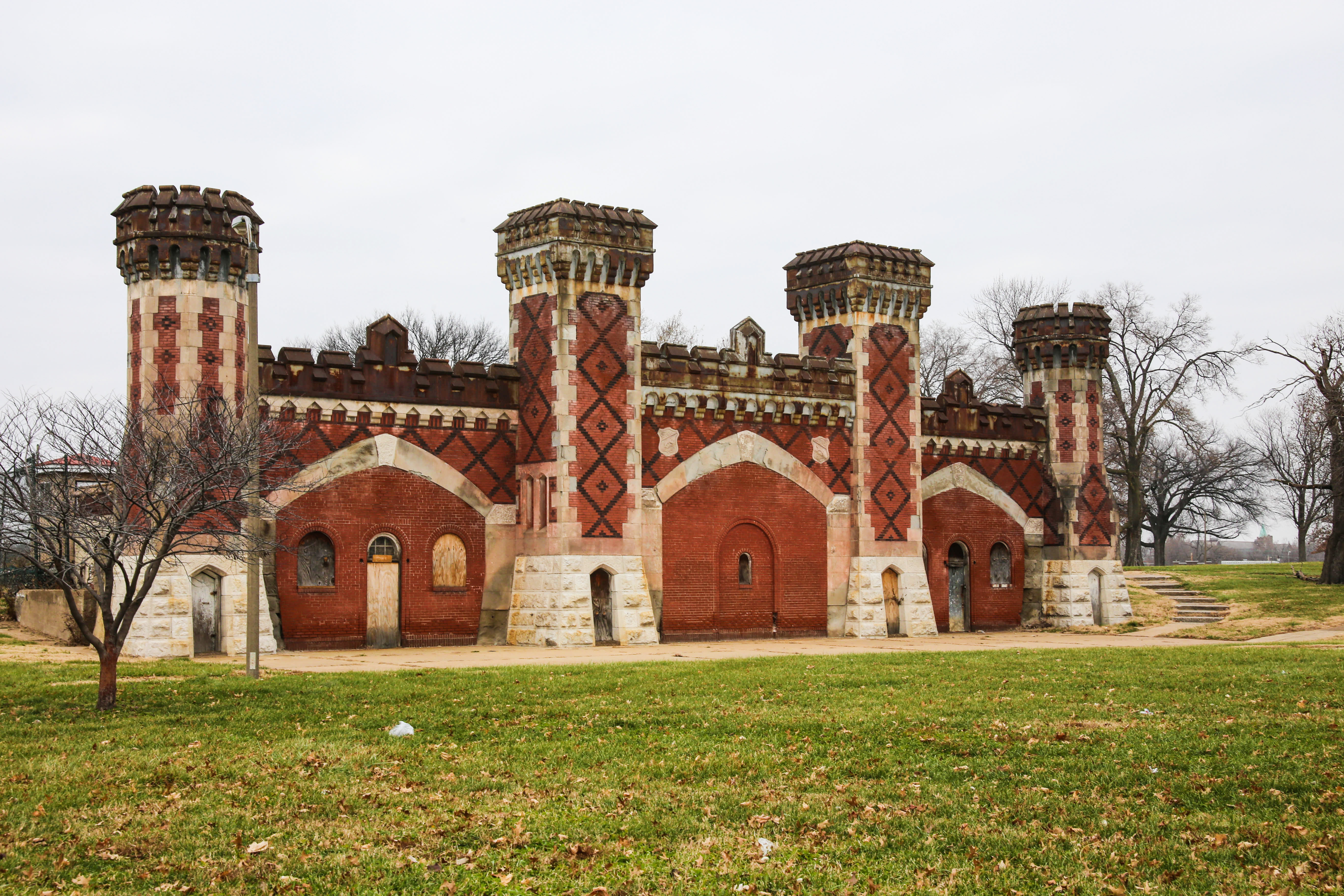
Facade of the old bear pits

Fairground Park is located in North St. Louis. It is bordered by Grand Boulevard to the east, Natural Bridge Avenue on the south, Fair Street to the west, and Kossuth Street to the north.

=== Surrounding areas ===
The park is surrounded by four neighborhoods. They are Fairground to the northeast, O'Fallon to the northwest, Greater Ville to the southwest, and Vandeventer to the southeast.

== See also ==
- Neighborhoods of St. Louis
- Parks in St. Louis, Missouri
- People and culture of St. Louis, Missouri
- St. Louis Exposition
- Vearne C. Babcock, who was a jockey at the park
- Black Veiled Prophet organization, which had an event there.

== Bibliography ==
- Carver, Nancy Ellen (October 21, 2002). Talk with Tilles: Selling Life in Fort Smith, Arkansas. St. Louis: Xlibris Publishing.
