= Tilles Park =

Park in St. Louis County, Missouri, United States

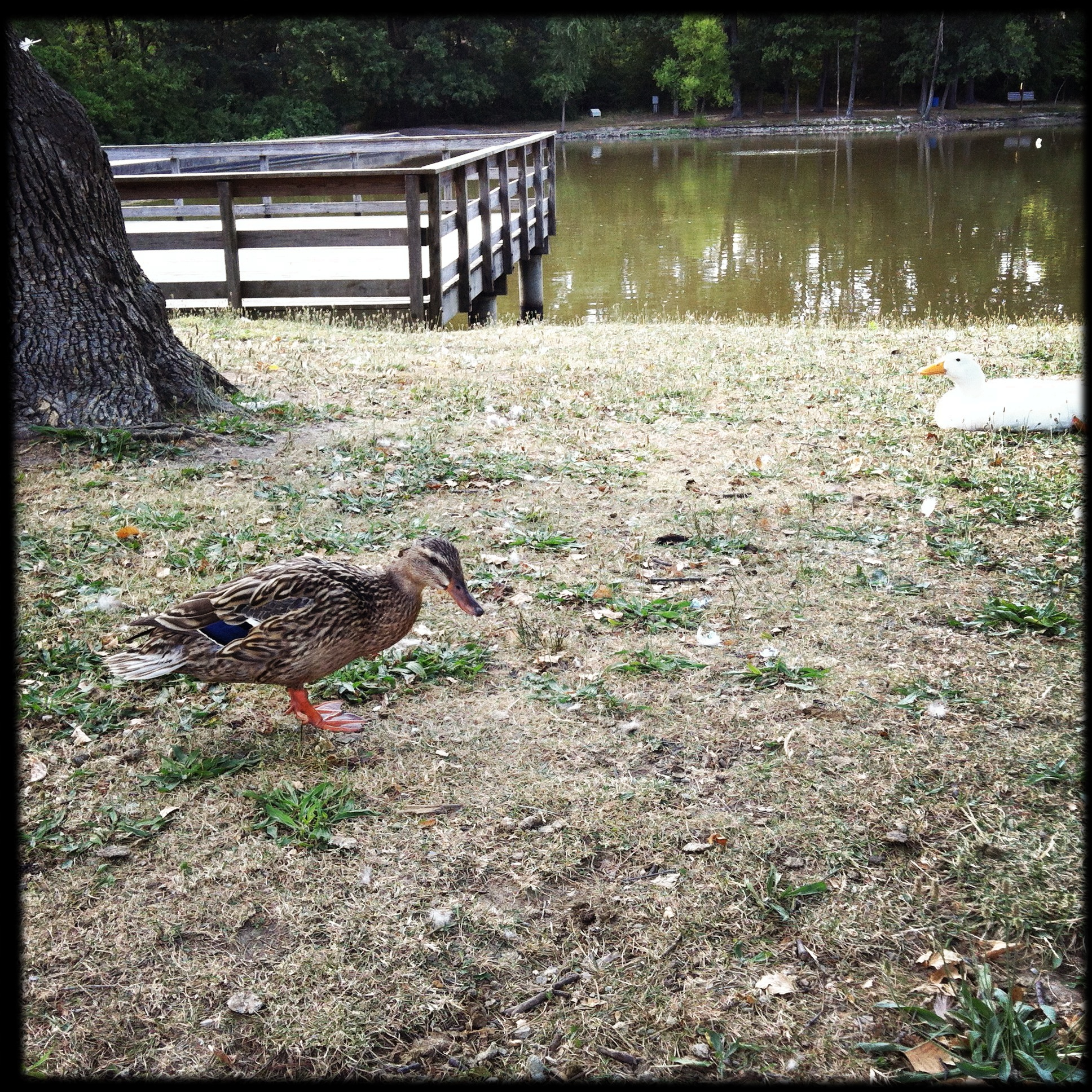
- Duck at Tilles Park, St. Louis County, Missouri
- Interactive map of Tilles Park
- Type: Urban park
- Location: St. Louis County, Missouri, United States
- Coordinates: 38.62131°N 90.36511°W
- Area: 75 acres (30 ha)
- Created: 1932
- Owner: City of St. Louis (1932–1957); St. Louis County (1957–present)
- Operator: St. Louis County Parks and Recreation Department
- Website: St Louis County Government, Tilles Park

Tilles Park is an urban park, owned and operated by St. Louis County, Missouri, in the western St. Louis suburb of Ladue. The park's full original name is the Rosalie Tilles Memorial Park, in dedication to the mother of park founder Cap Tilles. The park is located at Litzsinger Road and McKnight Road.

== History ==
=== 1932–1957 ===
In 1932, business magnate and philanthropist, Cap A. Tilles, donated land to the City of St. Louis for the purpose of converting the property into a municipal park. The park facilities were constructed by the Works Progress Administration, beginning in 1938. By World War II, the first phase of the park was completed.

=== 1957–present ===
In March 1955, the Mayor and the Comptroller were authorized to sell Tilles Park. A statistical survey of the park was commissioned by the city, revealing the location of the park made the site more popular among county residents than city dwellers. The study found that more than 80 per cent of the people who used the park lived in the county. Another study showed that the city needed more open park space for its citizens. As a result, in 1956 the City of St. Louis decided to sell the park to developers. However, the St. Louis County Council stepped into the process. On April 17, 1957, in a 4–3 vote, the Republican members of the council voted to save the park from destruction, agreeing to pay $429,625 for the park. St. Louis then created a new Rosalie Tilles Memorial Park within the city limits, at 38.6004°N 90.2897°W.

The park was listed on the National Register of Historic Places in 2018.

== Events ==
The park is a particularly popular destination for picnics. During December, Tilles Park is best known for its annual Winter Wonderland Light Show. The light show is an outdoor event, and consists of a series of elaborate structures, animals, and other Christmas themed decorations, constructed of electric lights. The show is open to both vehicular traffic and carriages, including for wedding engagement occasions. The show has been a mainstay of the park every winter since 1985.

== See also ==
- C. A. Tilles, Park Founder

== Bibliography ==
- Carver, Nancy Ellen (October 21, 2002). Talk with Tilles: Selling Life in Fort Smith, Arkansas. St. Louis: Xlibris Publishing.
- Hamilton, Esley and Harris Nini. St. Louis Parks. St. Louis: Reedy Press LLC, 2012.
