= Saint Louis Exposition =

Series of annual agricultural and technical fairs

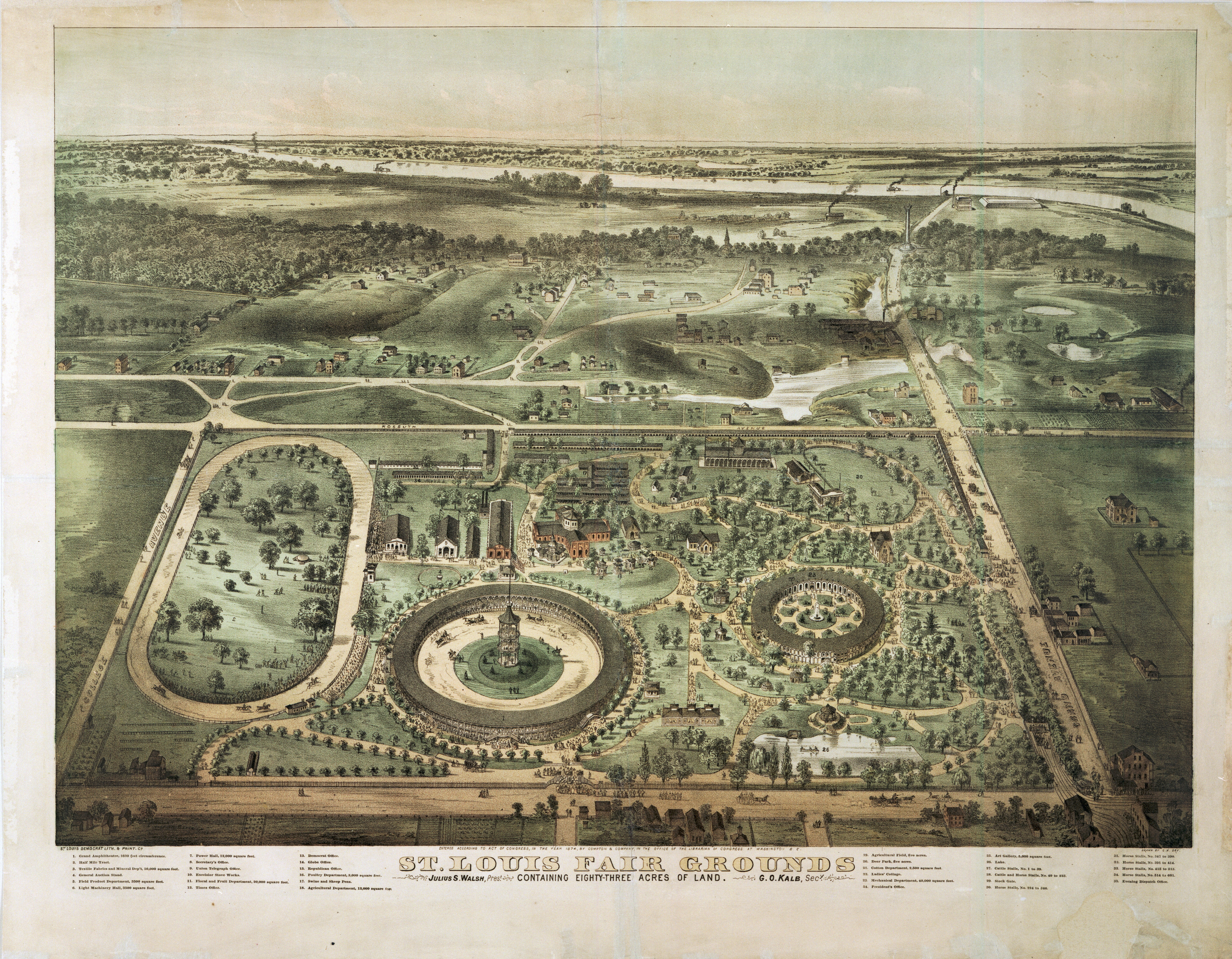
St. Louis Fair Grounds, site of annual Exposition, in an 1874 print

The Saint Louis Exposition or St. Louis Expo was a series of annual agricultural and technical fairs held in St. Louis' Fairgrounds Park, from the 1850s to 1902. In 1904, the Louisiana Purchase Exposition, a major World's Fair, was held in St. Louis, Missouri. Due to the 1904 St. Louis World's Fair, this fair was not held in 1903 or 1904 and ceased after the World's Fair. Memorabilia from the annual St. Louis Expositions are sometimes confused with 1904 World's Fair memorabilia on auction websites.

== St. Louis Agricultural and Mechanical Association ==
In 1855, a group of St. Louisans founded the "St. Louis Agricultural and Mechanical Association," which held annual fairs starting in 1856. Prominent citizens founded the association, which was not intended to pay dividends. All profits were to expand and beautify the fairgrounds.

The first officers were President J. R. Barrett, Vice Presidents T. Grimsley, A. Harper, and Henry Clay Hart; Treasurer H. S. Turner; General Agent and Recording Secretary G. O. Kalb; and Corresponding Secretary O. W. Collett. Other founding members included Andrew Harper, Thos. T. Janaury, John Withnell, Frederick Dings, James M. Hughes, Henry S. Turner, Charles L. Hunt, John M. Chambers, Henry T. Blow and Normal J. Coleman.

== Overview ==
A site of 50 acres (200,000 m^{2}) at the northwest corner of Grand Avenue and the Natural Bridge Plank Road was purchased by the Association from Col. John O'Fallon for $50,000(about $2 million in 2026). It was well outside the city limits—an hour's journey from the city by horse-drawn carriage.

The first fair opened with an amphitheater, exposition halls, a cottage with four saloons, multiple fountains and a pond. The annual fair was an immediate success and soon became noted all over the country. In its initial stages, it was more akin to a large scale county fair. There were booths for vending wine, beer, and other delicacies. There were displays of livestock, poultry, vegetables, grains, and the latest inventions in farm machinery, tools, household gadgets, etc. Over time, In addition to the exposition halls, a racecourse, grandstand and jockey club were built. Businesses would include if they had won a premium at the St. Louis fair in their advertisements.

Horticultural societies were founded to partner with the St. Louis A&M Association to ensure the best crops and farmers would attend the fair. Merchants and manufacturers also partnered with the Association to ensure the Fair's success. With a room dedicated to the St. Louis press at the fair, St. Louis newspapers covered each day's activities extensively. Newspapers across the country covered the fair as well. Many railroads agreed to provide cheaper fares to attend the fair as well as for any stock or articles that were to be displayed at the fair. Large scale annual pictorial catalogues and programs were produced. According to the St. Louis Republic, by 1859 the fair was bringing in over $500,000(equivalent to $21.5 million in 2026) to the St. Louis economy.

Fairs were suspended during the Civil War.

=== After the Civil War ===
After the Civil War, the popularity of the St. Louis Fair picked up once again. Exposition halls featured carriages, pianos, billiard tables, and furniture for display. Proprietors of hotels and entertainment venues offered private premiums to ensure the fair's success and entice tourists. In 1866, the St. Louis A&M Association resolved that the St. Louis Fair would always begin on the first Monday of October. "Big Thursday" was a municipal holiday of the fair week so everyone could attend the fair. From these fairs, vendors were selected to display their wares at the next upcoming World's Fair.

While animals(such as elephants, bears and monkeys) had been displayed at previous fairs, a zoological garden was added in 1876, modeled after the finest European zoological buildings. It consisted of a monkey house, bear pits, and a carnivore house. Later additions were an aviary, outdoor pens for herbivorous animals, a lake and a grotto. These structures and facilities were eventually absorbed by the St. Louis Zoo following its establishment. The fair saw nearly 40,000 daily attendees in the 1880s.

In 1868, they purchased an additional 35 acres and extended the grounds. In 1893, the fairgrounds were enlarged to 143 acres (0.58 km^{2}). In 1902, the first automobile race in St. Louis was held on the grounds.

The last official fair was held in 1902 because preparations were underway for the 1904 World's Fair. Another blow to the fair's revival after 1904 was the abolition of horse racing in Missouri in 1905.

=== Notable Attendees ===
Notable attendees over time include the Prince of Wales(future King Edward VII), at the time presidential nominee Abraham Lincoln as well as Presidents Ulysses S. Grant, Grover Cleveland and William Henry Harrison.

== 1850s ==
=== 1856 - The First Fair ===
The first fair opened on October 13, 1856. It featured the largest amphitheater in America at the time, seating over 12,000 and capable of sheltering 36,000. Other buildings and features included a three story tall Pagoda, a Floral Hall, a Mechanical Hall, a Machine Shop, seven fountains, a fish pond and a Gothic cottage with four saloons. $10,000 were paid in premiums.

=== 1857 ===
Building on the momentum of the first fair's success, a Fine Arts Hall and a 3-story wire Gallinarium (otherwise known as a "Chicken Palace") were added. They expanded the Mechanical Hall, doubled the size of the Machine Shop, increased stalls to 375 and upped premium offers to $16,000. It kicked off on September 28. The last day of the fair featured a riding match in the amphitheater for boys under the age of 14.

=== 1858 ===
On September 6, they kicked off the fair with a grand parade, complete with military companies. The Chamber of Commerce closed on opening day so they could attend the fair (and to celebrate of the completion of the Atlantic Telegraph). Premiums were increased again to $21,000, with an additional $4,000 in premiums offered by private individuals, mostly prominent businessmen. They implemented a Grand Field Trial of Agricultural Implements to showcase the practical side of farming implements prior to award selection.

=== 1859 ===
1859's marketing pamphlet included a feature of Madame Elizabeth Ortes (who ended up passing at 106 years old), the oldest resident of St. Louis at 96 years old; a feature on newspaper founder Joseph Charless "who was shot in the streets of St. Louis"; a brief history of the Association and St. Louis; many illustrations including the old Chouteau mansion. Continuing to expand St. Louis' reach, illustrations of the fair were produced to be printed across the pond in Illustrated London News.

Premiums were once again upped to $20,000 and were said to be the largest premiums ever offered at any previous Agricultural and Mechanical exhibition in the United States. A horse railroad to the Fair Grounds was completed prior to its opening. A few additional buildings were added included a Textile Hall as well as renovations to existing structures. The fair was officially now connected to telegraph communication and anyone could send a telegraph while at the fair. Former Tennessee Governor James Jones served on the thorough bred horse awarding committee.

=== 1860 - The Future King Edward VII Attends ===
Quite a few notable people attended this fair including the Prince of Wales(future King Edward VII), Lord Lyons, the Duke of Newcastle, and presidential candidate Abraham Lincoln. There were over 6,000 entries for the fair, about 1,200 more than any previous exhibition according to the New York Tribune. It also featured imports from Belgium. There was a grand picnic fundraiser to benefit the Mount Vernon Fund.

== Civil War Years ==
While there were no fairs during the Civil War, the St. Louis Agricultural and Mechanical Association itself continued on. Professor L. G. Tracy was selected to act as a representative of the association at the 1862 London World's Fair. In 1862, the thirteen elected members of the Board of Directors were requested to take the oath of allegiance if they had not already done so.

The fairgrounds were rented out for $600 a month during the Civil War. The large amphitheater was converted into one of the "largest, most thoroughly ventilated hospitals in the United States" accommodating 2,500 patients. Numerous other fairgrounds buildings of the association were taken over for officer's quarters, medical dispensaries, kitchens, and other military purposes.

== 1860s ==
=== 1866 - Vendors Selected to Display Wares at Upcoming Paris Exposition ===
The St. Louis economy greatly suffered during and after the war as it relied heavily on trade. With thousands of attendees, many from across the country, the fair was a way to reinvigorate it. However, St. Louis had suffered a cholera outbreak during the 1866 Cholera epidemic. St. Louis' outbreak would be later attributed to polluted well water by the Board of Health. With potential tourists hesitant to travel to St. Louis, the Association called a meeting with prominent merchants and manufacturers. The President of the Board of Health, John Finn, assured them that the outbreak had passed. Merchants agreed to continue to help boost the fair's attendance.

In anticipation for its opening, the Textile Hall was remodeled and enlarged. A Music Hall was erected to display musical instruments. Separate buildings were built by sewing machine companies to display their sewing machines. $25,000(equivalent to $525,000 in 2026 USD) in premiums were provided.

This year, the Commissioner for the State of Missouri to the Universal Exposition, James L. Butler, attended to select vendors to display their products at the upcoming 1867 Paris Exposition. The St. Louis A&M Association notes that displaying Missouri's best products at the seven month long Exposition in Paris would also encourage immigration to the state.

=== 1867 - New Orleans Agricultural Association Attends ===
By now, the fairgrounds had 600 stalls for horses and cattle, 100 pens for hogs and sheep and 90 booths and dining halls. It had a separate building for each department: floral, music, mechanical, vegetable, fine arts, machinery, agricultural, textile fabrics, geological, fruits and a Gallinarium. The geological department even had a 1,200 pound chunk of lead ore on display.

In order to keep competitions fair, they banned "professional" horses from competing in any category that was not explicitly noted as "open to all". $25,000 in premiums were offered again.

The New Orleans Agricultural Association and New Orleans journals attended the fair. The previous year, St. Louis A&M Secretary George Kalb had aided them in ensuring the New Orleans fair was a success.

Mayor James M. Thomas requested that all business close on Thursday of fair week to allow everyone the opportunity to attend. This was done at the request of the stockholders, officers and Directors of the St. Louis A&M Association as well as the President and Board of Directors of the St. Louis Merchant Exchange.

St. Louis Republic reported that there were over 150,000 attendees that year.

==== 1868 - Mammoth Air Balloons ====
By this time, the fair was known as the "St. Louis Fair". Due to the continuing popularity of the St. Louis Fair, they expanded the fair grounds by 35 acres. A new brick Mechanical Hall was not entirely finished but able to display all the items for the fair this year.

This year featured the "Mammoth Balloon Constitution". Passengers could ride an air balloon up to somewhere between 500 and 800 feet. American balloonist Silas Brooks oversaw this exhibit.

== The park transfers to St. Louis ==
After protracted political debate, the abandoned 132-acre (0.53 km^{2}) fairgrounds was purchased for park use by St. Louis for $700,000 in 1908, and Fairground Park was dedicated on October 9, 1909. Most of the fair structures and zoo buildings were removed. The bear pit structure and amphitheater remained.

In 1912, the amphitheater was removed and replaced by the city's first municipal swimming pool, then said to be the world's largest. This was replaced by a new pool in 1958 as part of the 1955 bond issue program, which also provided lighted ball diamonds and hard surface tennis courts.

At the corner of Grand and Natural Bridge, the facade of the old bear pits still guards the park's main entrance like a medieval castle and as a reminder of the glory days of the popular St. Louis Exposition.

== See also ==
- List of world's fairs
- Louisiana Purchase Exposition
- Fairground Park
