= Fairground Park riot =

1949 race riot in St. Louis, Missouri, United States

- Date: June 21, 1949
- Location: St. Louis, Missouri, U.S.
- Caused by: Recent desegregation of a public pool
- Methods: Melee conflict

Parties
White rioters	Black citizens

Casualties
- Injuries: 12
- Arrested: 7

The Fairground Park riot was a race riot that broke out on June 21, 1949, at a newly integrated public swimming pool. The Fairground Park pool was located near Natural Bridge and Vandeventer Avenues in north St. Louis.

== Background ==
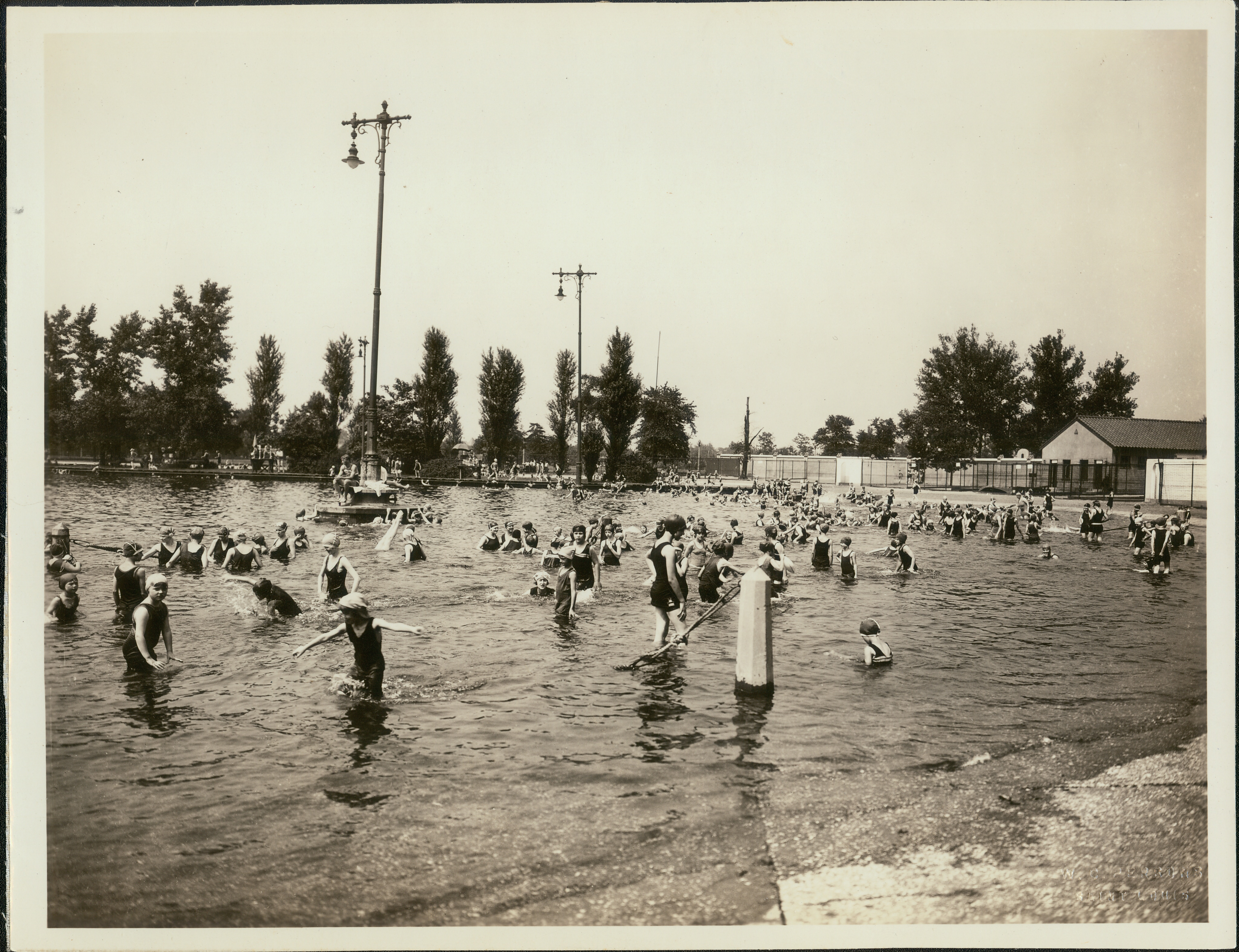
Swimmers at the Fairground Park swimming pool, 1920s

The Fairground Pool, in St. Louis, Missouri, was one of the largest pools in the American Midwest, measuring 440 feet. The pool was able to hold from 10,000 to 12,000 swimmers at a time. During this time period much of the country was suffering from segregation. Pickets had been put up at the Fairground Park to protest the segregation of pools despite the lack of support for segregation of public facilities in federal law. John J. O'Toole, City of St. Louis' Director of Public Welfare made the decision to desegregate the pool, saying, "I can't oppose anyone from lawfully using a swimming pool. They are taxpayers and citizens, too." On June 21, 1949, African Americans were allowed access to the city pool for the first time. Until that day, the Fairground Park swimming pool was only open to white patrons.

== The riot ==
On the first day that it was open to African Americans, only 30 to 40 African Americans showed up. They swam alongside white children without any problem until a group of white teenagers surrounded the fence that enclosed the pool and began to shout threats to the African American swimmers. African American children had to be taken to a changing room until it was safe enough for police to escort them. The eyewitness reports from that day contradict each other, with some saying that the children were not placed in harm's way, and others saying that the police did not stop the white teenagers from physically attacking the black children.

Some witnesses reported that by 6:45 p.m. that day the crowd escalated to several hundred people, and only 20 to 30 of them were African American. The riot escalated quickly after a rumor was spread that a black man there had killed a white boy. Many African American children were surrounded by younger protesters, who had arrived with baseball bats, bricks, other weapons. One African American child was attacked before an officer shielded him. By now, the crowd had turned into thousands. Between 150 and 400 police officers arrived at the scene. By about 9:30pm the situation had calmed, except for one attack which occurred an hour later some distance from the park. The crowd did not disperse until several hours later.

== Aftermath ==
After the riot died down, newspapers reported that there were over a dozen people injured and at least eight were arrested in connection to the riot. Twelve people were injured, six of whom seriously, and needed hospitalization or first aid. The official report states that seven people were arrested that day, three were white and four were African American. Of those seven, three black people and one white person were ultimately charged with initiating the riot. Attendance at the Fairground Park Pool dropped so significantly that it could no longer turn a profit and it was ultimately closed down.

== See also ==
- Fairground Park
- List of incidents of civil unrest in the United States
