= Fairground, St. Louis =

Neighborhood of St. Louis in Missouri, US

Coordinates: 38.6675°N 90.2148°W

Fairground
- Neighborhood of St. Louis
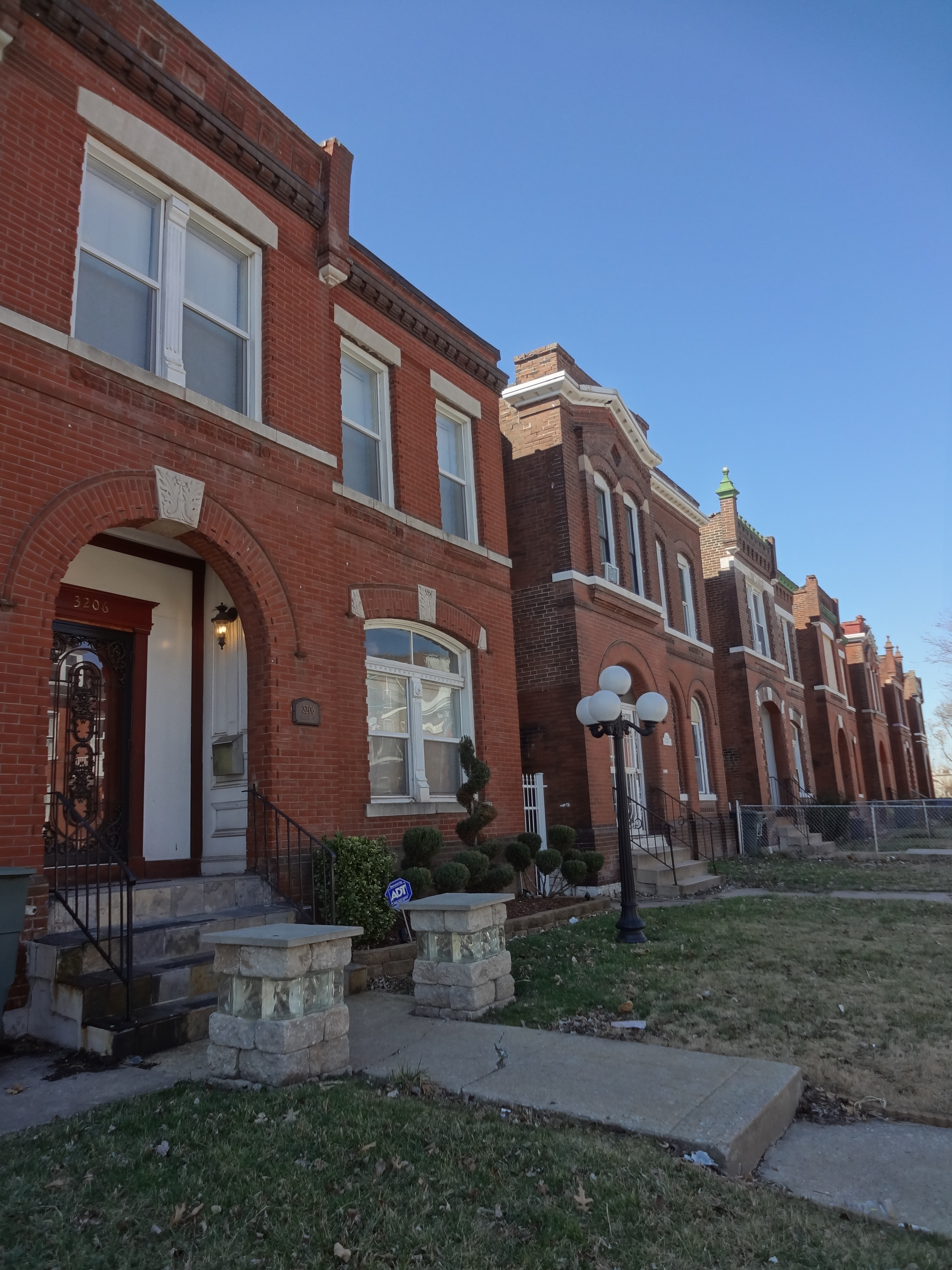
- Houses in Fairground, February 2012

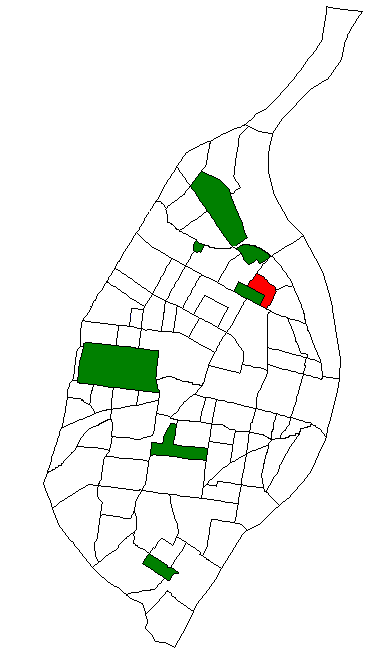
- Location (red) of Fairground within St. Louis
- Country: United States
- State: Missouri
- City: St. Louis
- Wards: 11, 14

Government
  - Aldermen: Laura Keys, Rasheen Aldridge

Area
  - Total: 0.32 sq mi (0.83 km^{2})

Population (2020)
  - Total: 1,157
  - Density: 3,600/sq mi (1,400/km^{2})
- ZIP code(s): Part of 63107
- Area code(s): 314
- Website: stlouis-mo.gov

Fairground is a neighborhood of St. Louis, Missouri. The neighborhood's boundaries are defined as Glasgow Avenue on the east, North Florissant Avenues on the north, Warne on the west, and Fairground Park and Natural Bridge Avenue on the south.

== Demographics ==
Historical population
Census	Pop.	Note	%±
1990	3,026		—
2000	2,472		−18.3%
2010	1,793		−27.5%
2020	1,157		−35.5%

In 2020 Fairground's racial makeup was 93.7% Black, 2.8% White, 0.4% Native American, 2.2% Two or More Races, and 1.0% Some Other Race. 0.9% of the population was of Hispanic or Latino origin.

== Police ==
St. Louis Police Department District 6
North Patrol Division
4014 Union
St. Louis, MO 63115

== See also ==
- Grand Boulevard (St. Louis)
