= Black Veiled Prophet =

The Black Veiled Prophet Ball was an observance in St. Louis, Missouri, beginning in 1967 in which an African-American man was named the Black Veiled Prophet and a woman the Black VP Queen. It was seen as a lampoon or a mockery of the whites-only Veiled Prophet Ball of that era.

Before World War II, the African-American community in St. Louis had crowned its own "Veiled Prophet Queen," who included Ernestine Steele in 1939 and Blanche Vashon (later Sinkler), Georgia Williams, and Evelyn Hilliard. A 1940 newspaper column said that for years the official VP Parade had drawn

many persons, white and colored, to the city . . . [and that] Years ago there was a dance for the colored citizenry on that night, but that affair was long discontinued. Five years ago, Mrs. Zenobia Shoulders Johnson, one of the city's most active church and civic workers, conceived the idea of a style show which would culminate in the crowning of the "Veiled Prophet's Queen," someone representative of real St. Louis culture and society, much in the same manner of the original event. The idea caught fire, and from the first night, overflow crowds have witnessed the event at St. James [ A.M.E. ] Church. And, in addition, the idea became so popular that this year there are fully half a dozen similar projects as conceived by Mrs. Johnson being held this week by various other racial groups.

Later, a Black Veiled Prophet event was established, the first such VP being Precious Barnes in 1967, followed by George Johnson (1968) and Carl Jackson (1969).

Esther Davis was chosen in 1967 as the first "Queen of Truth, Dignity, and Blackness" as a reward for selling the most ball tickets, 25-cent votes and advertisements for the ball program. Carol Jarrett was Queen in 1973, and in 1974 it was Martha Reed, with Carol Moreland second that year and Juanita Triggs third. Mildred Banks Shelton was named Queen of Human Justice in 1968, with Connie Foster in second place and Ann Perry in third. Madam Carol served in 1969. Minnie Dawson was Queen in 1976.

Proceeds went to the legal defense fund of the sponsoring group, called ACTION, for Action Council to Increase Opportunities for Negroes.

== Relations with Veiled Prophet Ball ==
Carl Jackson, 16, the Black VP in 1969, and Madame Carol, 21, the Queen, were among four arrested on October 3 of that year on a charge of disturbing the peace when they picketed the Veiled Prophet Ball being held at the Kiel Auditorium. They were greeted with handshakes later that night when they attended the Velvet Plastic Ball, a "parody-party" at the National Guard Armory.

In 1970, Percy Green, head of ACTION, said he sent letters to the "young [white] women bowing at the Veiled Prophet Ball," asking for whatever support they deemed appropriate for the Black VP. Green said: "We allow people of all economic levels and all colors to enter. In another four or five years, we'll see whether or not supporters of the white Veiled Prophet Ball have learned the concept of humaneness from the Black Veiled Prophet."

== Black VP observances ==
- 1967 Club Riviera
- 1968 Club Riviera
- 1974 and 1975 Afro Night 'N De Indoors Festival, at the Imperial Civic Center, 4339 Warne Avenue
- 1976 Afro Day 'N De Park, over three dates, the third being Rhythm of 'De Revolution in Fairground Park
