= Silas Brooks =

American balloonist (1824-1906)

- Born: 1824; Plymouth, Connecticut, U.S.
- Died: April 7, 1906
- Resting place: Burlington, Connecticut, U.S.
- Occupation: Balloonist
- Years active: 1853–1894

Silas Markham Brooks (1824 – April 7, 1906) was an American balloonist and circus performer. During his career, he made 187 known balloon flights.

== Career ==
=== Early Circus Career ===
Brooks first became involved in the circus in 1843, working for P.T. Barnum to create a fake Druid band. Brooks created instruments in a metal shop and trained the five-person band, mostly made up of German immigrants, in secret in Bristol, Connecticut. The band debuted in 1849 at Barnum's American Museum in New York City.

In 1850, Brooks became involved with Jenny Lind's American tour. Afterwards, he opened a museum of curiosities in St. Louis, Missouri, and established a traveling circus troupe. Brooks initially employed the famed balloonist John Wise; however later opted to hire a more affordable aeronaut to facilitate balloon ascensions.

=== Ballooning career ===
In 1853, during a show in Memphis, Tennessee, Brooks made his first balloon flight when the circus troupe's balloonist, William Paullin, fell ill. On July 4, 1854, with the financial backing of gun manufacturer Samuel Colt, Brooks made his first ascent in Connecticut. After this flight, he constructed two new balloons and toured the Midwest. During this time, he made the first balloon ascension in the cities of St. Louis and Chicago.

In 1859, Brooks took part in an unsuccessful attempt to make a transatlantic balloon crossing with balloonists John Wise and John LaMountain.

On September 2, 1863, while flying over Middletown, Connecticut, Brooks dropped a small dog attached to a parachute from the basket. The dog landed safely on the ground a few minutes later.

On July 4, 1894, at age 70, Brooks made his final balloon flight from Bushnell Park in Hartford, Connecticut. The balloon crashed into nearby buildings and trees shortly after taking off. Brooks was unhurt, yet this incident ended his aviation career.

=== Ballooning Accidents ===
In addition to his failed final flight, Brooks was involved in several balloon-related accidents.

On September 17, 1858, in Centralia, Illinois, two children were accidentally launched alone into the air in Brooks' balloon. Hours later, the balloon landed with the children unhurt.

On July 29, 1885, Brooks and fellow Connecticut Aeronaut, Alfred Moore, made a balloon flight from Winstead, Connecticut, in a balloon they claimed was the largest ever built. The pair encountered a thunderstorm, which overturned the balloon and tossed them from the basket. A report in the Alexandria Gazette stated that Brooks was badly hurt and was expected to die from his injuries. He lived another 21 years after the incident.

== Personal Life and Death ==
In October 1863, Brooks married circus equestrian Harriett Beach. The couple had one son, Henry, who died of measles at 18 months. After the death of their son, Beach left Brooks to rejoin the circus.

Brooks is thought to have suffered from alcoholism later in his life and admitted to being intoxicated during at least one balloon flight.

Sometime in the late 1890s, Brooks was badly injured in an explosion from an experiment he was conducting with naphtha. After this incident, Brooks became a ward of the state and resided in the Burlington Poorhouse until he died in 1906.

== Legacy ==
It takes no prophet to predict that briars will soon overgrow Brooks’s grave and that even the memory of his fame will be a forgotten story of the past.

— Silas Brooks' obituary, The Hartford Courant

While Brooks died in relative obscurity, he is now remembered as Connecticut's first Balloonist. Brooks' balloon basket is on display at the New England Air Museum in Windsor Locks, Connecticut. This basket is believed to be the oldest surviving American-built aircraft.
