= Tilles Foundation =

The Tilles Foundation is a St. Louis based charity fund for orphans, dependent mothers, and poor college students. The foundation was originally named the Rosalie Tilles Nonsectarian Charity Fund.

Established in 1926, the fund was a Christmas gift from C. A. Tilles to the City of St. Louis and its people.

== History ==
The foundation was established in 1926.

== Bibliography ==
- Carver, Nancy Ellen (October 21, 2002). Talk with Tilles: Selling Life in Fort Smith, Arkansas. St. Louis: Xlibris Publishing. ISBN 1401071996.
- "C. Andrew Tilles Dies; Was Racetrack Owner". Auburn Maine, The Lewiston Daily Sun. November 23, 1951. Retrieved on 16 January 2014.
- "Gives Million to the Poor" Cape Girardeau, Southeast Missourian. December 22, 1926. Retrieved on 21 January 2014.
