= Louis Cella =

American capitalist, turfman and political financier

Louis A. Cella
- Cella drawn portrait as featured in a 1905 newspaper article.
- Born: November 29, 1866; St. Louis, Missouri
- Died: April 29, 1918 (aged 51); St. Louis, Missouri
- Occupations: Co-founder of the Cella, Adler, Tilles Partnership; President of Cella Commission Company
- Spouse: Agnes Johnson Cella

Louis A. Cella (November 29, 1866 – April 29, 1918) was an American capitalist, turfman, and plutocratic political financier. In 1896, he co-founded the Cella, Adler, and Tilles investment syndicate with Cap Tilles and Samuel Adler. The partnership, also known as C.A.T., dominated the Midwestern horse racing industry through World War I. At its height, C.A.T. had a controlling interest in 25 horse racing tracks. C.A.T. also founded the Western Turf Association, which granted Cella and his partners near monopolistic control over jockeys, bookmakers, and horse owners in the Midwest. The partnership also had one of the largest networks of bucketshops in the US, with a presence in every major city in the country. Cella was nicknamed the "Dago Saloonkeeper," a reference to his early start as a saloonist before co-founding C.A.T. Cella made a fortune in real estate, commodities speculation, stock commissions, and horse racing. At the height of his career, Cella owned five large office buildings, controlled ten theaters, several hotels, and a large network of brokerages across the US.

From 1897 to 1904, Cella and his two partners had a monopoly on the St. Louis horse racing market. In 1905, gambling was abolished in Missouri by the progressive movement's Anti-Breeders Act, and the partnership's tracks were forced to close.

Cella turned his primary attention to real estate speculation and the Cella Commission Company he co-founded with his brothers. In 1910, Cella was arrested by federal marshals and extradited to Washington, D.C., in the Western Union bucket shop scandal. During the trial, the prosecuting federal attorney accused Cella of perjury, which was added to the charges against him. In 1911, Cella and his investment partners were acquitted of all charges after the Anti-Bucket Shop Act was declared unconstitutional. The ruling was seen as a setback for the progressive movement.

Cella ran for a seat in the Missouri State House of Representatives but was defeated. He then began financing state politicians, becoming a key political power in the advancement of various moneyed interests.

== Early life ==
Cella was one of five siblings born to John G. Cella and Mary Arado. His siblings were John, Angelo, Andrew, and Charles. His father and mother were Italians from the villages Bertigaro and Montemozzo outside the city of Chiavari in northern Italy's Liguria region, which was at the time part of the Sardinia Kingdom. At a young age, his father and mother immigrated to the United States. Cella and his siblings were born in downtown St. Louis, Missouri. As a boy, the family was poor, with Cella and his siblings helping to support the family whenever possible.

== Career ==
As a young man, Cella left St. Louis and moved to Kansas City, where he became a bartender at the old Kansas City railroad depot. At the time, the bar was one of the wildest saloons in the US. After a year in Kansas City, Cella returned to St. Louis, opening a saloon. Cella's saloon became a local favorite for gamblers, thieves, and other various criminal elements. At the age of 24, he introduced a popular dice game operating out of the establishment, which netted Cella over $100,000 by the time he was 27. With his fortune in gambling profits, Cella became a bookmaker for horse gambling in the heart of the St. Louis business district in the early 1890s.

Cella entered the horse racing industry in 1896, joining the partnership of Andrew Tilles and Samuel Adler. The partnership originally began with a cigar concession stand at the Delmar racetrack in 1886. In 1892, Tilles and Adler purchased the South Side race track. With the injection of Cella's share, the three turfmen bought out the Madison race track in Madison, Illinois. It was Cella's idea to also build a large pool house, alongside the race track that ran for eight years. The profits from the pool house were said to have laid the foundation for their $30 million fortune.

By 1902, the partnership had monopolized the entire St. Louis region. The partnership shortly acquired jericho tracks, as well as major tracks, across the United States. By 1911, this included tracks in Memphis; Little Rock and Hot Springs, Arkansas; New Orleans; Detroit; Cincinnati; Buffalo; Nashville; and Latonia and Louisville, Kentucky. The partnership even attempted to acquire Churchill Downs, opening the Douglas Park Racing Track near the legendary track and touching off a bitter rivalry between Churchill Downs owner American Turf Association and C.A.T.'s Western Turf Association.

At the time of his death, Cella had amassed the largest real estate portfolio in St. Louis.

== Politics ==
Cella ran for the state House of Representatives in Missouri. He lost and never sought political office again. After his defeat, Cella became a political financier for local and state elections. He financed candidates who supported legalization of gambling and lobbied unsuccessfully to defeat the 1905 Anti-Breeders Act banning horse gambling in Missouri.

== Death ==
Cella died on April 29, 1918, of a heart attack at St. Luke's Hospital in St. Louis, Missouri. He was buried in Calvary Cemetery at the Louis A. Cella mausoleum.

== See also ==
- Cap Tilles
- List of people from St. Louis
