= George Tilles Sr. =

American businessman and early developer of Fort Smith, Arkansas

- Born: September 11, 1859; St. Louis, Missouri, US
- Died: November 26, 1929 (aged 70); Fort Smith, Arkansas, US
- Occupations: Former president of the Progress Club; Entrepreneur
- Spouse(s): Ella Wormser Tilles (1862–1899); Lillian Wormser Tilles (1871–1953)
- Children: George Tilles Jr.
- Relatives: Cap Tilles (brother)

George Tilles Sr. (September 11, 1859 – November 26, 1929) was an American businessman and an early developer of the city of Fort Smith, Arkansas. Tilles was the older brother to Cap Tilles, a St. Louis capitalist and philanthropist. During his career, Tilles became a prolific entrepreneur and established a variety of businesses in manufacturing, insurance, brokerage, telephone communications, local theatrical production, and commercial property. He was also involved in charitable activities, most notably supportive of tuberculosis care, in memory of his younger brother Manny who died of the disease as a teenager.

== Early life ==
Tilles was born in St. Louis, Missouri, the eldest of five children to Melech "Louis" Tilles and Rosalie Peck. His parents met and married in Kansas before moving to St. Louis. His father was an immigrant from the Austro-Hungarian Empire and his mother an immigrant from neighboring Prussia. The couple moved to St. Louis where Louis worked for a tobacco manufacturing company. Tilles and his two brothers were born in the city during this period. The family subsequently moved to Fort Smith, Arkansas where Tilles' sisters were born. At the age of 13, Tilles' mother died of illness. Three years later, Tilles and his five siblings were orphaned with the death of their father. The four siblings were separated and housed in different residences in Fort Smith. The exception was Andrew and Manny, who were taken in by their Aunt's family, where Manny later died of tuberculosis. As the oldest, George was emancipated at 16 and began his business career on becoming an orphan.

== Career ==
Tilles' father died on his 16th birthday. He inherited the family cigar and manufacturing business in 1875. In 1880, Tilles also created the first telephone exchange in Fort Smith. Two years later, he sold the exchange to the Bell Telephone Company. He subsequently became secretary-treasurer and newspaper editor of the Fort Smith Tribune. Tilles also invested in a number of properties. During his career, he owned a hotel and the Tilles theater. He also founded a box company, a grain and stock brokerage, and an insurance agency. The insurance agency was known as The Equitable Life Insurance Company and its reputation became well enough established that the post office delivered a letter to the office marked: "George Tilles, Arkansas."

Tilles had other career interests than business. In 1906, he ran for a seat in the Arkansas State Senate as a Republican but was unsuccessful. Tilles also became an author, writing the history of Fort Smith from the Civil War to the early 20th century.

== Philanthropy ==
Tilles supported charitable work as a member of the Freemasons. He was one of a committee of seven Masons who worked to create the Arkansas State Tuberculosis Sanatarium at Booneville, Arkansas. Although the institution was to be state owned, the money to create the project was generated through private donations of the Masons. Within three years, the necessary funds were raised and allocated to the state government, where Tilles would regularly visit the children.

== See also ==
- Cap Tilles, horse racing magnate, philanthropist, and brother of George Tilles Sr.
- Fort Smith, Arkansas
- International Hat Company

== Bibliography ==
- Barger, C. (September 2, 2013). "The plight of Civil War orphans and the founding of the Rosalie Tilles' children's home" (PDF). The Journal. 37 (2). Fort Smith: Fort Smith Historical Society.
- Carver, Nancy Ellen (2002). Talk with Tilles : selling life in Fort Smith, Arkansas. [Philadelphia]: Xlibris Corp. ISBN 1401071996.
- Jones, Kevin L. (2013). Fort Smith. Charleston, South Carolina: Arcadia Publishing. ISBN 1467110817.
- Kalb, D. (2016). Guide to U.S. elections (Seventh ed.). Thousand Oaks, California: CQ Press. ISBN 9781483380353.
- LeMaster, Carolyn Gray (1994). A corner of the tapestry : a history of the Jewish experience in Arkansas, 1820s-1990s. Fayetteville: University of Arkansas Press. ISBN 1557283044.
