= Andrew Tilles =

American business magnate and philanthropist

Cap Tilles
- C. A. Tilles in St. Louis, MO
- Born: November 25, 1865; St. Louis, Missouri
- Died: November 22, 1951 (aged 85); St. Louis, Missouri
- Education: University of Arkansas at Fayetteville (1880–1882)
- Occupations: Former president of the Delmar Investment Company; Co-founder and former president of the Cella, Adler, Tilles Partnership; Founder of Louis Tilles Park and Rosalie Tilles Park; Founder of the Tilles Foundation
- Parent(s): Louis Tilles (February 13, 1829 – September 11, 1875); Rosalie Peck Tilles(1837-10 Aug 1872)
- Relatives: George Tilles, Sr. (brother)

C. Andrew "Cap" Tilles (November 25, 1865 – November 22, 1951) was an American business magnate and philanthropist. Based in St. Louis, Missouri, his C.A.T. investment syndicate was involved in cigar manufacturing, real estate, stock holdings, and brokerage services. It also acquired a near-monopoly on horse racing tracks outside of coastal states and brought major changes to the industry.

Later in life, Tilles turned to philanthropy. He started a $1 million foundation for the education of poor children, funded and developed three municipal parks, and performed other charitable acts.

In 1896, he co-founded and ran an investment syndicate that dominated the US horse racing industry through World War I. The investment syndicate became known in the media as the "Big Three," after its three principal partners: Louis A. Cella, Samuel W. Adler, and C. A. Tilles. The syndicate was officially known as C.A.T., which was short for the Cella, Adler, and Tilles partnership.

In 1905, Tilles was forced to close his race tracks, as a result of progressive politics abolishing gambling in Missouri. The closing of the tracks eventually resulted in a multimillion-dollar personal fortune for Tilles with the sale of the partnership's land holdings in St. Louis. The Delmar Race track land was particularly lucrative property for sale and development along the famed Loop of Delmar Boulevard. Tilles used his fortune to expand C.A.T. across the country. By 1914, Tilles had acquired 25 horse racing tracks across the United States, the most of any investor in US history. In 1901, he founded the Western Turf Association, which eventually monopolized the Midwestern and Southern track systems. By World War I, the Big Three had acquired most major non-coastal horse race tracks, with the exceptions of Hawthorne Race Course in Chicago and Churchill Downs. As president, Tilles revolutionized the horse racing industry by introducing electricity to the game, developing the modern system of licensing book makers, and holding the first-ever recorded instance of night racing.

Tilles was also associated with the cigar, real estate, stock, and brokerage businesses. In 1901, C.A.T. took ownership of the Delmar Investment Company, which among its holdings included a bucket shop. In 1909, bucket shops were declared illegal by the Anti-Bucket Shop Act of Congress. In 1910, Tilles and his partners at the Delmar Investment Company were arrested in the Western Union bucket shop scandal. Federal agents raided Western Union and uncovered a secret and illegal telegraph and ticker service for bucket shops across the country. In 1911, Tilles was extradited to Washington, D.C., to stand trial for illegally operating and conspiring to operate a bucket shop in St. Louis. On October 10, 1911, the case was dismissed in favor of Tilles' acquittal after the Anti-Bucket Shop Act was declared unconstitutional by Justice Wright of the District of Columbia Supreme Court.

== Early life ==
Tilles was born in St. Louis, Missouri, to Louis "Melech" Tilles and Rosalie Peck Tilles. He was the younger brother of businessman George Tilles, Sr.; other siblings included Emanuel, Hannah, and Carrie. The family left St. Louis and moved to Fort Smith, Arkansas, where Louis established a tobacco and cigar company. Early on, Tilles received the nickname "Cap", which he would use for the rest of his life.

Rosalie died in 1872 and Louis in 1875, orphaning the five Tilles children. The children were separated, with different local families volunteering to adopt them. Cap and Emanuel were initially adopted by the Berman family; Emanuel fell ill and died of tuberculosis at 19. Cap was eventually adopted by Josephine Adler, the mother of friend and future business partner Sam Adler.

Cap attended Arkansas Industrial College in Fayetteville—today's University of Arkansas—and returned to Fort Smith in 1882 to work with his older brother George, who had continued his father's tobacco business and cigar-making factory. In 1886, Cap and Sam Adler moved to St. Louis to launch their own tobacco and cigar business.

== Cella, Adler, and Tilles Partnership ==
=== Founding and early growth ===
Tilles became president of the St. Louis Fairgrounds Track in 1902, completing his monopoly of the region.

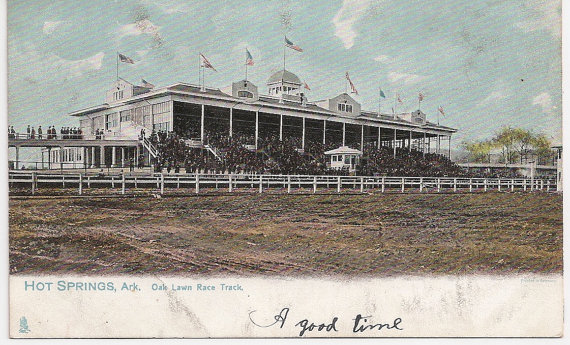
Oaklawn Race Track, acquired by C.A.T. in the late 1890s.

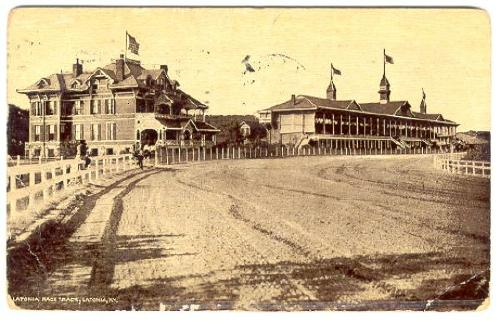
Latonia Race Track, acquired by C.A.T. in 1909.

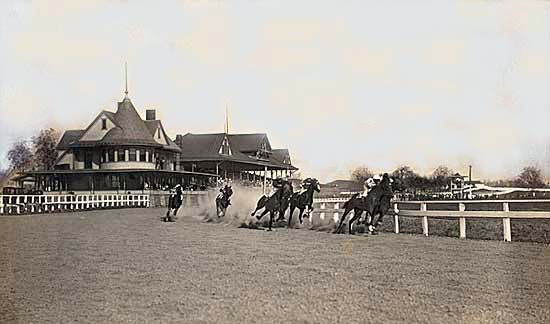
In 1901, Charles Green, on behalf of Cella, Adler, and Tilles, purchased their first Kentucky race track to mount a challenge against Churchill Downs.

Tilles and Adler started the Missouri Cigar & Tobacco Co. by purchasing a cigar store in the old Southern Hotel, which proved so successful they were soon able to open a tobacco concession stand at the nearby South Side Track. Shortly thereafter, the track went out of business. From their monies earned through their Fort Smith businesses, as well as the St. Louis cigar stores, the two men formed a partnership, buying out the South Side Track in 1892. They originally intended to use the location as a baseball park., but instead reopened the track. To avoid competition from local race tracks that ran during the day, the South Side Track installed arc light lamps and became the first track to offer night racing. The novel venue was profitable. Within a short time, the pair joined with millionaire Louis A. Cella to buy and re-open the Madison Track in East St. Louis.

In the mid-1890s, the trio formed the Western Turf Association, which became known as Cella, Adler, and Tilles, or C.A.T. for short. The next major purchases of the newly established syndicate were the acquisition of the Delmar Investment Company and the Delmar Racing Track in St. Louis, Missouri. Soon after, Tilles' partnership spent $250,000 developing a state-of-the-art facility at Delmar. This gave Tilles a strong position not only in horse racing in St. Louis but control over a firm stake in the gambling profits of the book makers. However, this also set off alarm in parts of the horse racing industry that Tilles' association was becoming too powerful.

By 1901, the dominance of C.A.T. in the St. Louis area led to the owners of St. Louis Fairgrounds Track, the most established racing track in St. Louis and one of the largest and most profitable in the United States, to form a protectionist Turf association in the Midwest to try and destroy C.A.T. The St Louis Fair and Jockey Club President Robert Aull organized the Western Jockey Club to punish any horse owner or jockey that ran on any of the Tilles managed horse tracks, with the explicit purpose of running the businessmen out of the game. Tilles wanted free and open contracts, where any jockey, horse, or owner could race. In 1902, it took an investment of $500,000 for C.A.T. to penetrate into the Western Jockey Club. In the same year, the Big Three had bought out the St. Louis Fair and Jockey Club that had tried to destroy them for $700,000, with Tilles swiftly being named president of the once hostile group. In response to the slash and burn tactics of his competitors, Tilles kept the Western Jockey Club in place and aimed the same weapon used against him to now be used against other owners that tried to eliminate him from the game. By 1902, Tilles had monopolized the entire St. Louis region. Within short order, Tilles would go on to purchase jericho tracks, as well as major tracks, across the United States. By 1911, this included tracks in Memphis, Little Rock, Hot Springs, Arkansas, New Orleans, Detroit, Cincinnati, Buffalo, Nashville, Latonia, Kentucky, and Louisville, Kentucky. Tilles even attempted to acquire Churchill Downs, opening the Douglas Park Racing Track in close proximity to the legendary track. The experience left a bitter rivalry between the American Turf Association, which owned Churchill Downs and Tilles' Western Turf Association.

By 1905, Tilles' Western Turf Association was powerful enough to dictate much of the political and commercial aspects of horse racing. This included contracting jockeys and horses to only run on Western Turf sanctioned tracks or be ineligible from participating on any association owned facility. With the East Coast tracks agreeing to honor the Western Turf decisions, this gave Tilles' club power over the owners of every track in the United States, except for California. This made Tilles one of the most politically powerful men in the history of US horse racing.

=== Financial challenges in the Progressive Era ===
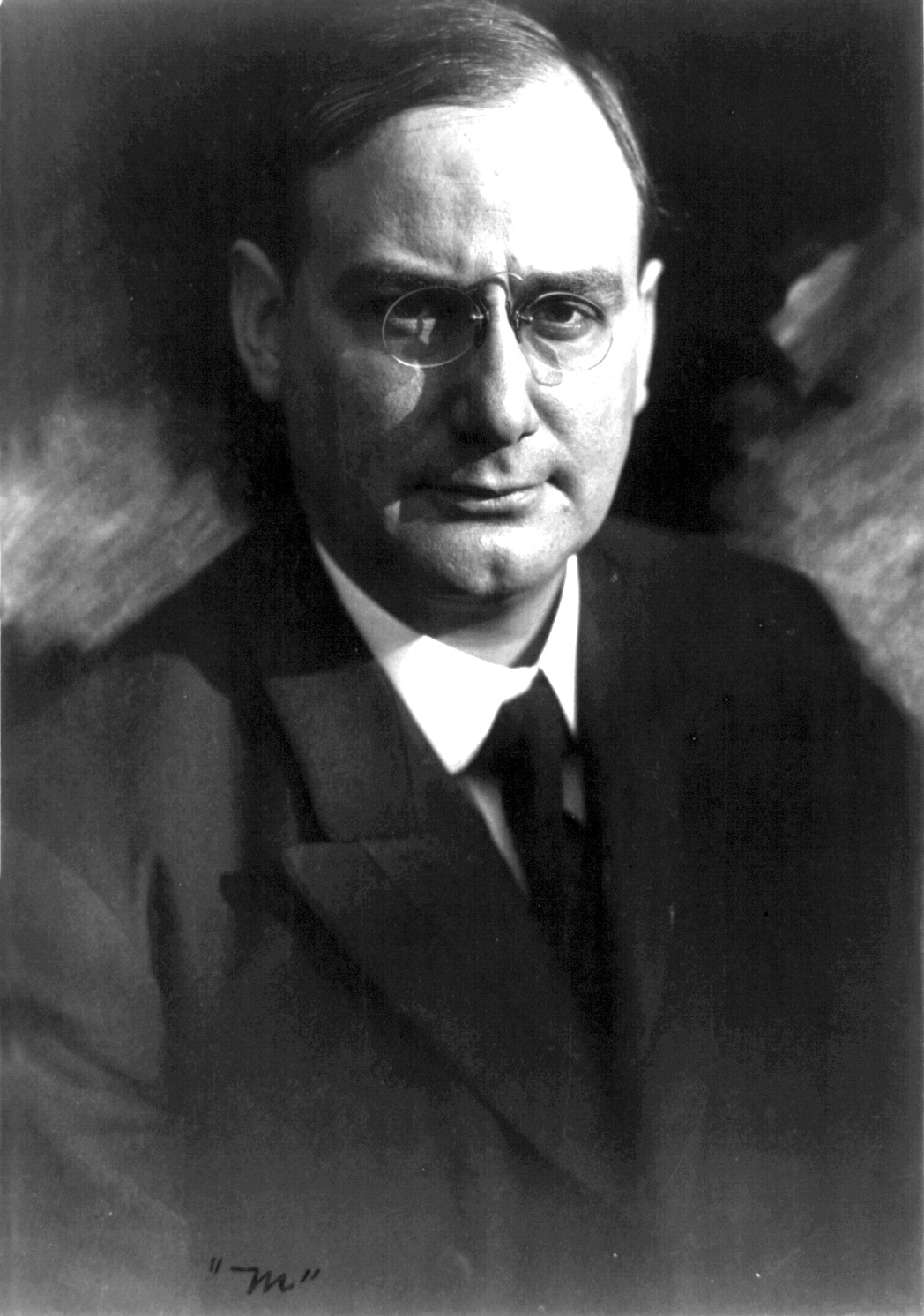
Governor Folk declared war against horse racing and Tilles, threatening to send armed soldiers to close down the Delmar track by force.

In the late nineteenth century, horse racing was the most popular sport in the United States. By 1900, every major city in the US had at least one track. The popularity of the sport led to a national political backlash during the Progressive Era. Social activists within the progressive movement organized against sports gambling, perceiving the horse track experience as an intemperate vice of modern urban life. Problems began to arise for the C.A.T. partnership in St. Louis with the election of progressive reformer Governor Joseph W. Folk, in 1904. Nicknamed "Holy Joe", the 31st Governor of Missouri launched an all-out legislative crusade against gambling in the state. Folk's explicit intention was to abolish horse racing in Kansas City and St. Louis. If successful, Folk would succeed in running Tilles and his partnership out of business. aware of the financial danger, Tilles and other owners lobbied state legislators to reject Folk's agenda. By March 1905, the Democrat controlled state House of Representatives voted to repeal the Breeders Act, which had legalized bookmaking in Missouri in 1896. The repeal effectively abolished horse racing in Missouri, as bookmaking was the primary source of revenue for track owners. The Senate passed the House bill by a single vote, becoming law on June 18, 1905. The law, often referred to as the Anti-Breeders Act, immediately resulted in a strong public backlash. Six bookkeepers and many spectators at the Delmar Race Track refused to abide by the prohibition on gambling. By the end of the first day of the law's enactment, Governor Folk declared over 1,800 persons had committed felonies by defying the Anti-Breeders Act.

After the Anti-Breeders Act went into effect, operations at the Delmar Track continued. Missouri Attorney General Herbert S. Hadley accused Cella, Adler, and Tilles of defying the new law. The rhetoric quickly intensified from the state government, with Governor Folk issuing orders to Sheriff George Herpel of St. Louis County to immediately cease all betting at the Delmar race track. However, in a sign of the deep unpopularity in St. Louis, the Sheriff refused to comply with the Governor and enforce the unpopular new law. Enraged, Folk threatened to send in the state militia to forcibly shut down the gambling at the Delmar track with the use of armed soldiers.

Sheriff Herpel fired back that any soldier sent by the Governor into the county would be arrested at the track for disturbing the peace. With the Sheriff refusing to act, St. Louis City police chief Kiely stepped in and raided the track with a large contingent of 35 policemen, shutting down Delmar. Tilles immediately sued the City of St. Louis police department for $25,000 in actual and punitive damages, arguing that the city police had no legal jurisdiction in the county. Tilles also sued the Pulitzer Prize Company for libel for running stories with the attorney general vilifying the C.A.T. partnership.

In the aftermath, Tilles' partnership would lose four tracks in St. Louis from 1901 to 1905 from progressive laws targeting the practice of gambling. These closings would cost the partnership over $1.5 million in lost net profit. This forced Tilles to expand operations into other states, from Louisiana, to New York, to Michigan. As for Governor Folk, his popularity in the cities plummeted following his aggressive and uncompromising abolition. Folk would not be re-elected in 1908 and retired from politics. A direct consequence of the law was the swift dominance of baseball in the state, effectively replacing horse racing within just a few years.

=== Western Union Bucket Shop Scandal ===
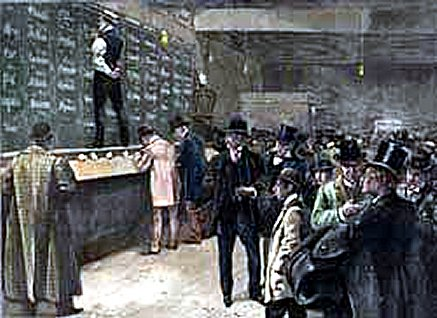
A bucket shop was a stock and commodity futures exchange for mostly margin and side betting. Tilles' company operated a bucketshop in St. Louis, which came under legal assault in 1909, with the passage of the Anti-Bucket Shop Act.

With his background in the stock and brokerage business, in acquiring the Delmar Investment Company, Tilles operated a bucket shop in the first decade of the 20th century. A number of major investment deals took place through this operation, including large minority holdings for C.A.T. in the St. Louis Transit Company and United Railways. However, one of Theodore Roosevelt's last acts as President of the United States was signing into law the Anti-Bucket Shop Act on March 1, 1909. This rendered Tilles' operation illegal. Federal agents raided the Western Union Telegraph Company on April 2 and 30, 1910.

On June 10, 1910, Cap Tilles, Sam Adler, and Louis Cella, were among 23 wealthy men, indicted by a grand jury for taking part in the activities of an illegal bucket shop. On January 20, 1911, District Court Judge Dryer ordered Cap Tilles be extradited to Washington, D.C., for the trial. After the incident, Tilles would exit the brokerage business, and turn heavily towards real estate outside the C.A.T. partnership, where he would become one of the wealthiest individuals in St. Louis by the 1930s.

== Philanthropy ==
=== Louis Tilles Park ===
In 1924, in honor of his late father, Cap founded the Louis Tilles Children's Park in Fort Smith, Arkansas located at North 37th Street & Grand Avenue. At the time of its dedication, the park was 12 acres. A major addition came in 1930, a World War I doughboy statue placed at the entrance of the park, in honor of the first citizen of Fort Smith killed in the service. The municipal park remains open to the present day.

=== Tilles Foundation ===
In 1926, Cap Tilles initiated the Rosalie Tilles Non-Sectarian Charity Fund, a million dollar charitable organization, as a Christmas gift to the poor of St. Louis, MO. The foundation was named in honor of Cap's mother, Rosalie Peck Tilles.

The Tilles Foundation continues to exist into the present day under the management of trustees. Since 1926, the original mission of the foundation has been to financially assist deserving St. Louis area children in substantial need of educational or physical aide. In 1955, the mission of the foundation was extended to include scholarships for university students, namely: Washington University in St. Louis, Saint Louis University, and University of Missouri–St. Louis. The foundation also assists such charitable organizations that may be engaged in similar charitable undertakings.

=== Rosalie Tilles Park ===
In 1932, Tilles donated a 68-acre parcel of land located in St. Louis County at Lay and Litzinger Roads to the City of St. Louis. The park was named in honor of Tilles' mother, Rosalie Peck Tilles. The county park was developed in 1937 by the City of St. Louis and W.P.A. funds and was maintained by the city for 18 years. A study found that more than 80 per cent of the people who used the park lived in the county. Another study showed that the city needed more open park space for its citizens.

In March 1955, the mayor and the comptroller were authorized to sell the Rosalie Tilles Park in the county. The proceeds from the sale of the county park were used to purchase 29 acres for the present Rosalie Tilles Park at Hampton and Fyler. This Park was extensively developed from the 1955 Bond Issue. Hampton Gardens apartments, on the park's north side, were built in 1952 on the site of the former cemetery for indigent people. The area surrounding Tilles Park is part of the Northampton neighborhood, which is divided into two parts. East of Macklind is Kingshighway Hills and west of Macklind is the Tilles Park neighborhood. The park serves as the heart of the neighborhood and the park benefits from the care provided by its residents. The Tilles Park Neighborhood Association plants and maintains the trees and garden in its park and the park committee schedules "work" days at the park. The "Taste of Tilles" raises funds to plant trees, shrubs and flowers in the park.

== Marriage and family ==
The Tilles name is Hebrew, "deriving from the female name of Tilka". The etymology of the surname signifies "praise, noble light, or majestic glory." The Tilles family originally settled in Kraków, Poland most likely in the late 1700s. Both sides of the Tilles family were first generation immigrants to the United States. Louis was the first Tilles to leave the Austrian-Hungarian Empire for the United States sometime after 1847. Rosalie Peck was born Prussian in an area now part of Poland, in the present day.

Cap Tilles married the St. Louis socialite Cora Lee Eddington on October 17, 1901. During the marriage they were known to travel extensively through the United States and Europe. However, Cora soon admitted to her husband she only married him for his money and filed for divorce. Tilles never remarried nor did he have any children. However, he worked closely with his siblings on a number of philanthropic projects throughout his life, as well as maintaining close relations with them personally.

== Legacy ==
Tilles had a long and at times controversial career in the horse racing and brokerage industries, which was followed by a long career in philanthropy. His legacy is shaped by the controversial nature of horse gambling of the era. Many horse racing enthusiasts supported Tilles' development of state-of-the-art tracks and ability to circumvent progressive anti-gambling laws in the United States. Others saw him and the syndicate he led as a corrupting moral force on the country, while his competitors saw him as too powerful and monopolistic in the racing industry.

For Tilles' part, he wanted to be remembered as a capitalist, a man that could overcome modest beginnings and being orphaned as a boy to become one of the wealthiest notables in St. Louis. In his later years, it was Tilles' hope that through his philanthropy he could help future generations of poor children emulate the possibilities of his own life.

== See also ==
- Louis Cella
- St. Louis Fairground Park
- Tilles Park
- List of people from St. Louis

== Bibliography ==
- Boulden, Ben. Hidden History of Fort Smith, Arkansas The History Press, February 21, 2012.
- The Bourbon News. "Thoroughbred Interests Attacked". Paris, Kentucky, October 14, 1921. Retrieved December 30, 2013.
- The Bourbon News. "Rev Mann Takes Issue About Pari-Mutuel Wagering" Paris, Kentucky, September 23, 1921. Retrieved December 30, 2013.
- Carver, Nancy Ellen (2002). Talk with Tilles : selling life in Fort Smith, Arkansas. [Philadelphia]: Xlibris Corp. ISBN 978-1401071998.
- The Citizen. "Delmar Jockey Club Files Suit Against Gov. Folk and Others". Berea, Ky., July 27, 1905. Retrieved December 30, 2013.
- The Indianapolis Journal. "General Sports News", March 15, 1901. Retrieved December 30, 2013.
- LeMaster, Carolyn (July 1, 1994). A Corner of the Tapestry: A History of the Jewish Experience in Arkansas, 1820s–1990s. University of Arkansas Press. ISBN 978-1-55728-304-7.
- The Lewiston Daily Sun. "C. Andrew Tilles Dies; Was Racetrack Owner". Auburn Maine, November 23, 1951. Retrieved January 16, 2014.
- The Minneapolis Journal. "Track Gamblers are on the Hike" Minneapolis, August 2, 1905, p. 8. Retrieved December 30, 2013.
- New York Times. "Folk Offers Soldiers to Stop Track Betting.". New York, June 19, 1905. Retrieved December 30, 2013.
- New York Times. "Sheriff Defies Folk". New York, June 25, 1905. Retrieved December 30, 2013.
- New-York Tribune. "Western Union Indicted". New York City, June 11, 1910. Retrieved December 8, 2013.
- Omaha Daily Bee. "Desire to Avoid a Merger" Omaha, Nebraska, November 1, 1904. Retrieved December 30, 2013.
- The Salt Lake Herald. "Baseball is King Now" Salt Lake City, Utah, August 16, 1908. Retrieved December 30, 2013.
- The Salt Lake Tribune. "Tilles to Be Removed". Salt Lake City, Utah. January 21, 1911. Retrieved December 8, 2013.
- The Spokane Press. "Last Days Racing in Old Missouri", Spokane, Wash., June 7, 1905. Retrieved January 3, 2014.
- St. Louis Republic. "City Police May Enforce Sunday Closing in County Today: Chief Kiely and 35 Men Visit Delmar Track; No Arrests Made". St. Louis, July 23, 1905, Front Page. Retrieved December 30, 2013.
- St. Louis Republic. "Fair Grounds to be Sold to Syndicate". St. Louis, March 15, 1901, Front Page. Retrieved December 8, 2013.
- St. Louis Republic. "New Orleans Track Closes Saturday", September 12, 1902, Front Page. Retrieved December 30, 2013.
- St. Louis Republic. "New Race Track Means a Turf War", September 12, 1902, Front Page. Retrieved December 30, 2013.
- St. Louis Republic. "Tilles President of Fair Association", March 23, 1901, Front Page. Retrieved December 30, 2013.
- The Tilles Foundation "History of the Tilles Foundation: Andrew Cap Tilles". Retrieved December 8, 2013.
- University of Missouri—St. Louis. "St. Louis Bond Issue 1955 Voting Totals Election of May 26, 1955 (Special Election)". League of Women Voters Collection, Western Historic Manuscripts. Retrieved December 8, 2013.
- The Washington Herald. "Ed Corrigan Bankrupt" Washington D.C., November 17, 1909. Retrieved December 8, 2013.
